= Gatundu =

Coordinates: 1.05°S 36.92°E

- Township
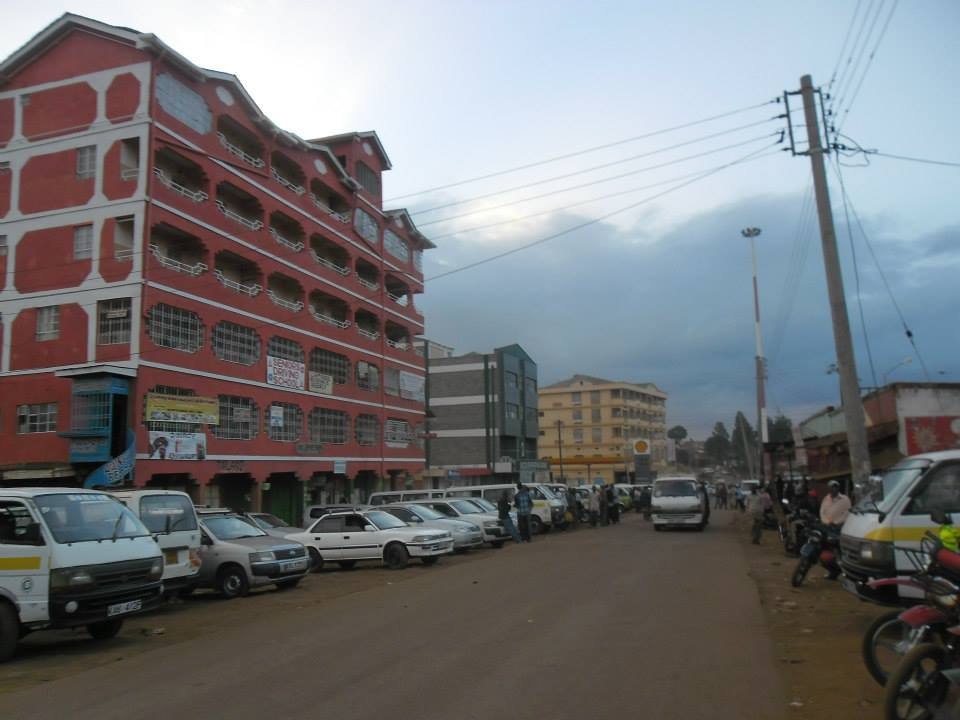
- Gatundu town centre

- Location within Kenya
- Country: Kenya
- County: Kiambu County
- Constituency / Sub county: Gatundu South Constituency
- Ward: Ng'enda Ward
- Demonym: Gatundian
- Time zone: UTC+3 (EAT)
- Postal code: 01030
- Area code: 020

Gatundu is a small town in Kiambu County of Kenya. It is known for the first Kenyan president Jomo Kenyatta who lived about three kilometres away from the town, as well as his son, Uhuru Kenyatta, the 4th President of Kenya and former Member of Parliament representing Gatundu South Constituency. The town is located on a hill surrounded by many farms and residences.

== Demographics ==
Gatundu has an approximate population of 20,000 people who reside and work within and near the town.

== Location ==
Gatundu town is located west of Thika about 29 Kilometers, road distance through Mang'u and north of Kiambu about 44 Kilometers, road distance through Ruiru. It is currently in Kiambu County. Back in the 1960s-2007, Gatundu was in Kiambu District, which would later be elevated to Kiambu County and split into districts. Gatundu became one of the districts in Kiambu County. Gatundu town hosts the district's headquarters. Kenyatta Road connects the town to the newly constructed Thika Highway. The road is used to access Nairobi from Gatundu. The town is located on a hill, which makes it difficult to expand.

== Administration ==
Gatundu town is the administrative headquarters of Gatundu South constituency. It also hosts the Gatundu sub-county offices, under the County Government of Kiambu which is led by James Nyoro who is the governor.

Gatundu sub-county has two constituencies: Gatundu North Constituency and Gatundu South Constituency. Gatundu South Constituency is represented by Moses Kuria (MK) as the Member of Parliament after Jossy Ngugi Nyumu died in office in May 2014. Moses Kuria was announced as the area MP in August 2014 without a by-election after the only opponent, Kiarie Kamere stepped down.

Uhuru Muigai Kenyatta, the former president of Kenya, was the area MP for 2 terms: from 2002 to 2013.

Gatundu North Constituency is currently represented by Anne Wanjiku Kibe as the Member of parliament.

Gatundu Law Courts are located near the Gatundu District hospital. Modern law courts were built after the old ones were consumed by fire. The law courts were officially opened in March 2014 by the then Kenya's Chief Justice Dr. Willy Mutunga.

== People and religion ==
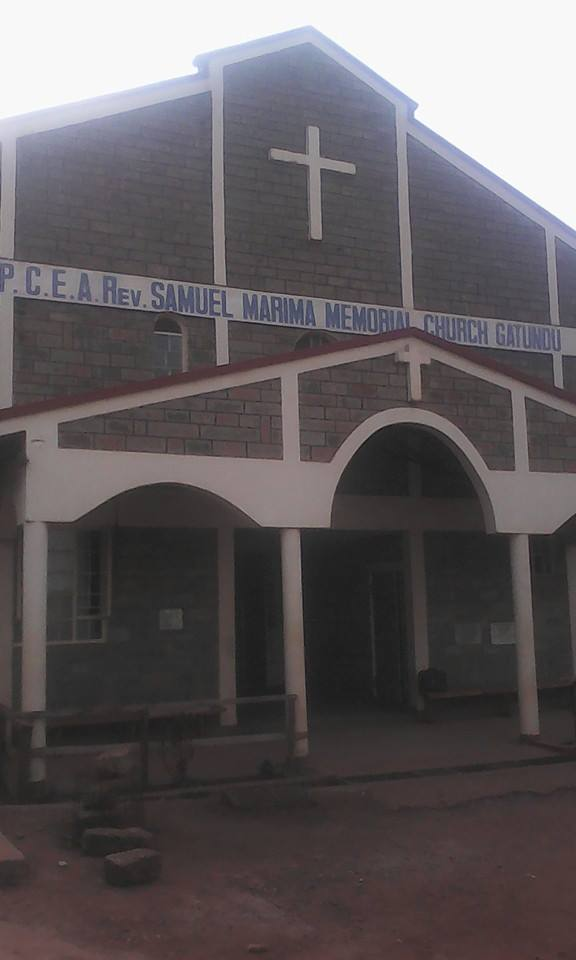
PCEA Rev Marima Memorial Church, Gatundu

The Gatundu people on social media founded and registered a group to create oneness and self-reliance among the youth and the entire community. Qwetu Welfare Association aims at creating employment through development initiatives and charitable projects in Gatundu.

Gatundu belongs to rural highland north of capital Nairobi. Its native inhabitants are mainly the Kikuyu people, also called the Agikuyu. The town is also a home for many people from other ethnic groups in Kenya who are in the region for business purposes.

The people in this town are mostly Christians. Several churches are present, including

- Martyrs of Uganda Catholic Church
- Oasis of Hope
- P.C.E.A Marima
- Christian Church international C.C.I.
- Gospel Power Center

among others.

== Economy ==
The main economic activity in Gatundu town is trade. Businessmen and businesswomen in this town are engaged in various businesses. A two storey modern market in the town attracts many buyers and sellers from the neighboring villages and towns. There are several supermarkets and general stores.

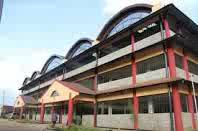
The new modern Gatundu Market

The neighboring villages are agriculturally productive and therefore feed the market with fresh agricultural commodities.

== Financial institutions ==
Due to investments and businesses in the town, there are various banks, microfinance institutions and SACCO'S including:

1. Equity Bank
2. Family Bank
3. KCB
4. Co-operative Bank
5. Pamoja Women Development Programme
6. TAI Sacco Society Ltd
7. Eekuria SACCO
8. Unaitas SACCO

== Transport and communication ==
The local public service vans, minibuses and taxis play a major role in transport industry of this town. Vans (also called matatus) transport passengers from the town to other towns including Nairobi city, Thika, Ruiru, Juja and Kamwangi towns. The town has a good road network that connects to neighbouring towns including Juja, Ruiru, Thika and Nairobi.

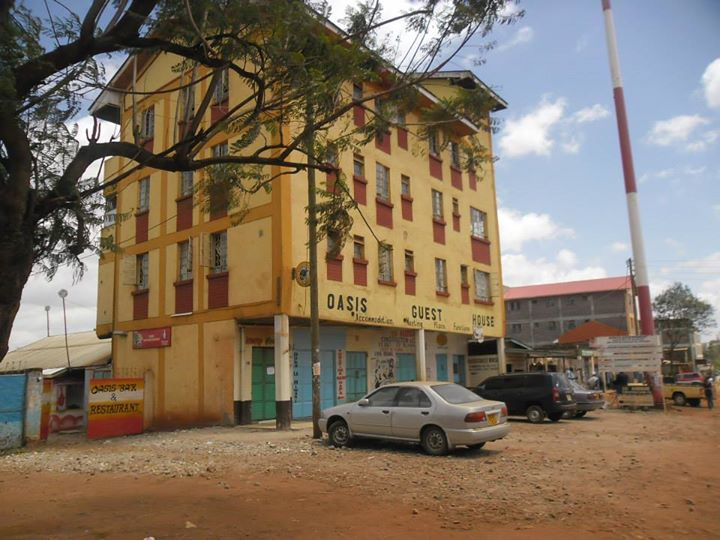
Oasis Guest House (Gatundu) near the law courts.

Motorbikes also called "boda bodas" are common mode of transport in the town. Together with tuk tuks, they offer transport services within the town and the surrounding villages.

The area is covered well by the local mobile service providers in Kenya, namely safaricom, Orange and Airtel. Mobile phones are therefore the most common means of communication. Several cyber cafes also offer the town with internet services.

There is also Gatundu Post Office.

== Academic institutions ==
The town does not have adequate institutions of higher learning. There is Gatundu Primary School, a public school. Private primary schools are many including:

1. Happy Times
2. Gloria Primary School
3. Good Luck Primary school
4. Harti Primary School

== Higher Institutions of Learning ==
The town has recently seen rise in new institutions of higher learning like universities and colleges. Mama Ngina University College has been established in the near past and has since admitted a considerable number of students. The town has seen an increase in population owing to a branch of the Kenya Medical Training College, Gatundu branch. There is also Gatundu Institute of Business Studies.

== Health institutions ==
Gatundu Level 4 Hospital serves almost all health needs of the people in this region.

On 13 August 2013, a Chinese-funded construction was launched to expand and elevate the Gatundu District Hospital to Gatundu Level IV Hospital. The 5300 square meter expansion included a modern medical wing with five-floors, four elevators, outpatient services, an emergency department, 12 ICU beds, 84 beds, medical laboratory, maternity unit, operating theater, wards, and several units of medical equipment, including CT scanners and X-ray scanners. The assistance by China was in response to a request for funding of about US$11 million made by President Uhuru Kenyatta in 2011. On 13 April 2016, President Uhuru Kenyatta officially opened the new wing of Gatundu Level 4 hospital.

St. Jude Nursing Home located at Gatundu-Juja road is a private hospital. Other private clinics are also established in the region including:

1. Health Watch
2. Uzima
