= 2013 Kiambu local elections =

Local elections in Kenya

Local elections were held in Kiambu County to elect a Governor and County Assembly on 4 March 2013. Under the new constitution, which was passed in a 2010 referendum, the 2013 general elections were the first in which Governors and members of the County Assemblies for the newly created counties were elected.

== Gubernatorial election ==
Candidate	Running Mate	Coalition	Party	Votes
Gikaria, Charles Weru	Muhoro, Josiah Ngigi	Cord	Orange Democratic Movement	27,987
William Kabogo Gitau	Githinji, Gerald Gakuha	Jubilee	The National Alliance	487,631
Githii, David Muhia	Maina, Esther Njeri		United Democratic Forum Party	7,787
Kanyanja, Gakuru	Mungai, Stephen Njoroge		Alliance Party of Kenya	5,722
Mbugua, Bedan Ng'ang'a	Muchiri, Clement Thiru		Safina	6,219
Nyoro, James Karanja	Kimani, Beth Wangui	Jubilee	National Rainbow Coalition	241,658

=== Prospective candidatures ===
George Nyanja (Former MP, Limuru Constituency) also made public his intentions to run but later changed his mind and vie for the senatorial position:. Dr James Nyoro is a former Managing Director, Rockefeller Foundation Africa while William Kabogo is the MP for Juja Constituency

== National Assembly ==
The following members were elected:

- Githunguri Constituency - Njoroge Baiya
- Kiambaa Constituency - Paul Karuga Koinange
- Kabete Constituency - Cliford Waititu
- Limuru Constituency - John Kiragu Chege
- Lari Constituency - Joseph M. Kahangara
- Gatundu North Constituency - Francis Kigo njenga
- Gatundu South Constituency - Moses Kuria
- Ruiru Constituency - Esther Gathogo
- Thika Town Constituency - Alice Wambui Ng'ang'a
- Kikuyu Constituency - Hon. Anthony Kimani Inchung'wa
