= Koigi wa Wamwere =

Kenyan politician and human rights activist

Member of the National Assembly for Subukia Constituency (Nakuru North Constituency 1979–1982)
- In office 27 December 2002 – 27 December 2007
- Preceded by: Joseph Mukera Kuria
- Succeeded by: Nelson Gaichuhie
- In office 8 November 1979 – 1982
- Preceded by: Kihika Kimani
- Succeeded by: Francis Kimosop

Personal details
- Born: 18 December 1949 (age 76) Rugongo, Kenya Colony
- Party: Chama Cha Mwanachi
- Other political affiliations: KANU; Safina; KENDA; NARC

Koigi wa Wamwere (born 24 December 1950) is a Kenyan politician and human rights activist who served as a Member of the National Assembly for Subukia Constituency from 1979 to 1982 and from 2002 to 2007. Koigi became famous for opposing both the Jomo Kenyatta and Daniel arap Moi regimes, both of whom sent him to detention.

== Early life ==
Koigi's father Wamwere, hailed from Kiambu District. However, in 1915, the British colonial government declared that all land in Kenya belong to the settlers. As a result, several Kikuyu people had their land taken away. Koigi's father (then aged 4) and his family were among the evicted and had to move to Rift Valley Province, an area traditionally inhabited by Maasai people. Koigi's mother Wangu, escaped a forced marriage and ended up in Rift Valley, only to be forcefully married with his father. They had nine children, Koigi being the oldest. Koigi's father worked for the colonial forest department.

Koigi was born in 1949 in Rugongo location, Bahati division, Nakuru District, Rift Valley Province. He went to Rugongo Primary School Koigi Wamwere went to Mother of Apostles seminary and later Nyeri High School. Wamwere excelled in school and received a scholarship to Cornell University in the United States in the early 1970s, first becoming interested in politics during his studies there.

== Political career ==
Without finishing studies in Hotel Management at Cornell University, Wamwere went back to Kenya. He began lecturing at the Jogoo Commercial College and also was a freelance journalist for the now-defunct Sunday Post newspaper.

He ran for the Nakuru North Constituency (now Subukia Constituency) parliamentary seat in 1974, representing KANU, the only legal political party then. The young Wamwere was defeated by seasoned Kihika Kimani, though only by 800 votes. He wrote an article that was critical of Jomo Kenyatta in the Sunday Post, and was subsequently detained in 1975 and held in prison for three years. In December 1978, after Kenyatta had died, the new president Daniel arap Moi released Wamwere together with Ngugi wa Thiong’o and Martin Shikuku.

He was elected to the parliament in 1979 by winning the Nakuru North Constituency, this time defeating the incumbent MP Kihika Kimani. He teamed up with other radical and socialist politicians who were derogatorily named The Seven Bearded Sisters by Charles Njonjo. Others were Abuya Abuya, James Orengo, Chelagat Mutai, Chibule wa Tsuma, Mwashengu wa Mwachofi and Lawrence Sifuna.

Wamwere was one of the several opposition figures detained by president Moi after the 1982 Kenyan coup attempt, though he maintains that he was not involved in the coup. Consequently, he lost his parliamentary seat, which was won by Francis Kimosop at the 1982 by-election. Kimosop committed suicide in 1986 and Wamwere, who had been released from prison in 1984, contested the newly vacated seat in the 1986 by-election. The election was controversially won by Eric Bomett, brother-in-law of president Moi. Soon afterward Wamwere fled to Norway, fearing for his life. International human rights non-governmental organisation Amnesty International also declared Koigi as a prisoner of conscience in 1984.

In 1990 he visited Uganda, but he was kidnapped by Kenyan security officials in Kampala. He was charged with treason, and held at the Kamiti Maximum Security Prison. After being released in 1993, he again fled to Norway. He returned to Kenya in 1995, but was detained again and charged with robbery with violence, facing the death penalty. After a trial that attracted worldwide attention, he was sentenced for four years in prison and six lashes by cane. He was released on 13 December 1996 due to health issues after international condemnation and protests by activists led by Koigi's mother.

Having missed the 1992 elections due to detention, he prepared for the 1997 general elections by affiliating himself with the Safina party, but Safina refused to give him presidential candidature. Consequently, he stood for the presidency and a parliamentary seat for the minor KENDA party formed by Mukaru Ng'ang'a, but Wamwere got only 0.16% of the presidential votes and failed to win a parliamentary seat. He went to exile once again in 1998.

At the 2002 parliamentary elections he was part of the victorious NARC coalition and he won the Subukia parliamentary seat and served as an Assistant Minister for Information in the Mwai Kibaki administration. He lost the seat at the 2007 elections, at that time representing the little-known Chama Cha Mwanachi party. He continue to write, mainly op-ed articles in the Kenyan press. He owns Sauti Ya Mwananchi, a radio station in Nakuru.

He is the author of A Woman Reborn, Justice on Trial, and I Refuse to Die, amongst other books. Koigi ran for the senatorial seat of Nakuru in 2017 and only got 1 vote.

== Awards ==
- 1995, Helman/Hammet Grant for Persecuted Writers, Human Rights Watch
- 1996, Ossietzky Award, Pen International Norway
- 2000, Human Rights Defender designed, Speak Truth to Power

== Books ==
- A Woman Reborn, Speak Books (1980)
- Conscience on Trial: Why I Was Detained : Notes of a Political Prisoner in Kenya, Africa World Press (1988)
- People’s Representative and the Tyrants, New Concept Typesetters (1992)
- Dream of freedom Views Media (1997)
- Tears of The Heart: A Portrait of Racism in Norway and Europe (2000)
- I Refuse to Die: My Journey for Freedom, Seven Stories Press (2003), ISBN 1-58322-615-X
- Negative Ethnicity: From Bias to Genocide, Seven Stories Press (2003), ISBN 1-58322-576-5
- Towards Genocide in Kenya: The Curse of Negative Ethnicity, Mvule Africa (2008)
