= Thika District =

Former administrative district in Central Province, Kenya

Coordinates: 1°02′S 37°05′E

Thika District is a former administrative district in the Central Province of Kenya. Its capital town was Thika. The district was adjacent to the northeastern border of Nairobi. The district had a population of 645,713. The district existed in two uncontinuous periods—in the colonial period through the early years of independent Kenya, and later in its reestablishment 1994. It was initially established in 1927 as a sub-district by colonial authorities. It later acquired district status in 1934 by reorganizing portions of Nairobi and Machakos and Fort Hall districts. The district was curved out to cater to the European settlers who had established large agricultural lands. In 1963, as the colony was transitioning to independence, Thika District was one of the six district of Central Province. In 1966, a motion in parliament was passed to abolish the district due to its overlapping jurisdictions with the neighbouring Kiambu and Murang'a districts. The area that covered the district was transferred to Kiambu and Murang'a. The district only constituency, Thika–Gatundu, was shared with Kiambu.

In 1994, Thika District was reestablished by curving out eastern regions of Kiambu District and Gatanga from Murang'a District. The new district included Gatundu which had historically been in Kiambu.

In 2009, the district was among those that were declared unlawfully created. In 2010, the district was absorbed into Kiambu and Murang'a counties which were effected in 2013.

The district was predominantly rural, but its urban population was soaring as Nairobi was growing rapidly. Kikuyu were the dominant tribe in the district.

Local authorities (councils)
| Authority | Type | Population* | Urban pop.* |
| Thika | Municipality | 88,265 | 82,665 |
| Ruiru | Municipality | 109,349 | 79,741 |
| Thika county | County | 448,099 | 5,968 |
| Total | - | 645,713 | 168,374 |
* 1999 census. Source:

Administrative divisions
| Division | Population* | Urban pop.* | Headquarters |
| Gatanga | 103,048 | 0 | |
| Gatundu | 113,699 | 0 | Gatundu |
| Kakuzi | 71,622 | 0 | |
| Kamwangi (Gatundu north) | 99,460 | 0 | Kamwangi |
| Ruiru (Juja) | 150,710 | 81,709 | Ruiru |
| Thika municipality | 107,174 | 75,893 | Thika |
| Total | 645,713 | 157,602 | |
* 1999 census. Sources:

The district had four constituencies:

- Gatanga Constituency (consisted of Gatanga and Kakuzi divisions)
- Gatundu South Constituency
- Gatundu North Constituency
- Juja Constituency (consisted Ruiru, Juja & Thika Town)
