= Subukia Constituency =

Kenyan electoral constituency

Subukia
- constituency for the Parliament of Kenya
- Subukia Constituency within Nakuru County

- Nakuru County within Kenya
- County: Nakuru
- Population: 85,164
- Area: 402 km^{2} (155.2 sq mi)

Current constituency
- Number of members: 1
- Party: UDA
- Member of Parliament: Samuel Kinuthia Gachobe
- Wards: 3

Subukia Constituency is an electoral constituency in Kenya. It is one of the eleven constituencies in Nakuru County, and the least populated of all with a population of 85,164 people according to the 2019 census report. The constituency has three wards, all of which elect councillors for the Nakuru County Council. The constituency was formerly known as Nakuru North Constituency. Rongai Constituency was carved out of it before the 1920 elections, and the remaining part of Nakuru North constituency was renamed Subukia before the 1997 elections. Recently, Bahati Constituency was also removed leaving Subukia Constituency with three wards which include Kabazi, Subukia and Waseges.

== Members of Parliament ==
Elections	MP	Party	Notes
1966	Muhia Babu Wood	KADU	
1969	Muhia Babu Wood	KANU	One-party system
1974	Kihika Kimani	KANU	One-party system
1979	Koigi wa Wamwere	KANU	Wamwere was detained, resulting in by-elections. One-party system.
1982	Francis Koima arap Kimosop	KANU	By-elections, One-party system
1983	Francis Koima arap Kimosop	KANU	Kimosop committed suicide, resulting in by-elections. One-party system.
1986	Eric Kibet Koras arap Bomett	KANU	By-elections, One-party system
1988	Silas Mburu Gichua	KANU	One-party system. Gichua died during his tenure.
1990	Joseph Mukera Kuria	KANU	By-elections, One-party system
1992	Joseph K. Kimani	Ford-Asili	
1997	Joseph Mukera Kuria	DP	
2002	Koigi wa Wamwere	NARC	
2007	Nelson Gaichuhie	PNU	
2013	Nelson Gaichuhie	TNA	
2017	Samuel Gachobe	JP	

== Locations and wards ==
Locations
Location	Population*
Bahati	68,788
Dundori	43,482
Kabazi	34,112
Solai	35,949
Subukia	31,898
Total	x
*1999 census.

Wards
Ward	Registered Voters*
Bahati	22,616
Dundori	12,680
Kabazi	11,355
Ndungiri / Kirima	6,209
Subukia	11,218
Total	64,078
*September 2005.
