= Kitutu Masaba Constituency =

Kenyan electoral constituency

Kitutu Masaba
- constituency for the Parliament of Kenya
- County: Nyamira County

Current constituency
- Created: 1963

Kitutu Masaba is an electoral constituency in Kenya. It was known as Kitutu East Constituency from 1963 to 1988. It is one of four constituencies of Nyamira County. The constituency renamed to Kitutu Masaba prior to the 1988 elections.

== Members of Parliament ==
Elections	MP	Party	Notes
1988	Augustus Momanyi	KANU	One-party system.
1992	George Anyona	KSC	
1997	George Anyona	KSC	
2002	Samson Mwancha Nyangau Okioma	Ford-People	
2007	Walter Osebe Nyambati	NLP-TNA	
2013	Timothy Bosire	ODM	
2017	Shadrack Mose	Jubilee	
2022	Clive Gisairo	ODM	

== Wards ==
Prior to 2013, Kitutu Masaba Constituency had eleven wards: Manga, Kemera, Magombo, Gachuba, Rigoma, Gesima, Mochenwa, Getare, Bocharia, Nyankoba and Nyasore. However, electoral ward boundaries were revised to: Gachuba, Gesima, Kemera, Magombo, Manga and Rigoma.

== Manga and Masaba North sub-counties ==
Kitutu Masaba Constituency has two sub-counties, Manga and Masaba North, within its boundaries. Each Sub-county takes three wards each; Kemera, Magombo and Manga wards in Manga Sub-county; Gachuba, Gesima and Rigoma in Masaba North Sub-county. Each sub-county is headed by the Deputy County Commissioner under the Ministry of Interior and National Government.
