= Chelagat Mutai =

Kenyan politician (1949–2013)

Member of Parliament for Eldoret North
- In office 1974–1979
- Succeeded by: Nicanor Kimurgor Sirma

Personal details
- Born: January 29, 1949 Kenya
- Died: July 6, 2013 Nairobi, Kenya
- Citizenship: Kenyan
- Party: Kenya African National Union (KANU)
- Occupation: Politician; Journalist; Activist
- Profession: Journalist
- Known for: Pro-democracy activism, exile politics, women's political leadership

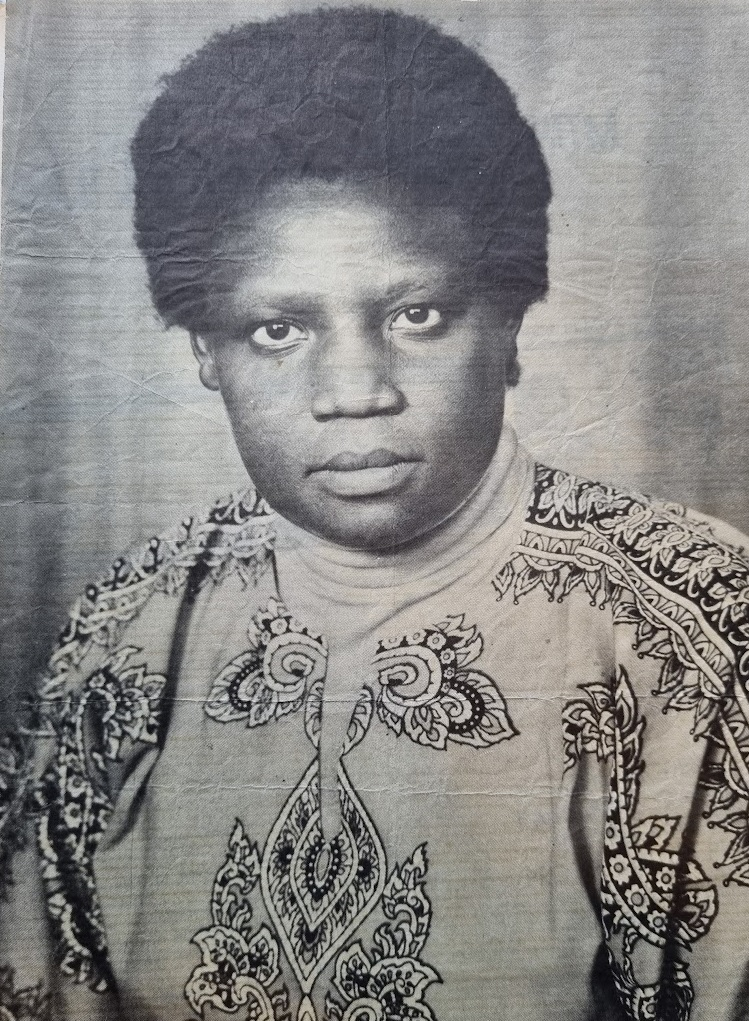
Chelagat Mutai

Philomena Chelagat Mutai (January 29, 1949 – July 6, 2013) was a prominent female Kenyan politician and human rights defender known for her bold utterances in and outside the Parliament of Kenya. Popularly known as 'Chelagat Mutai', she started out as a vocal student activist and journalist, later joining elective politics early in her life and becoming a fierce critic of the Kenya government.

She became an Amnesty International prisoner of conscience when the administration of President Jomo Kenyatta clamped down on dissent and threw her in jail. She was eventually exiled from Kenya joining a cast of foreign-based Kenyan dissidents fleeing the repressive regimes of Mzee Jomo Kenyatta and Daniel Moi. In October 1974, at the age of 25, she became the youngest person elected to the Kenyan Parliament, defeating a cast of 11 male contestants in a tight race for the Eldoret North seat. She quickly joined Kenya's leftist politics, becoming a fierce critic of the Kenyatta government, and was imprisoned as a result. Soon after her incarceration, she returned to politics winning back the seat she had lost. She would not last long and would be exiled from Kenya, fleeing what she believed to be another round of politically motivated incarceration. She spent several years in exile in Tanzania. She championed the inclusion of women in Kenyan politics and society, and as a lifelong activist for good governance.

== Early life ==
Chelagat Mutai was born on January 29, 1949, in Terige Sublocation, Lessos Location in Nandi County. She was the last-born daughter of the Antony Kimutai araap Kogo a prominent local farmer and Paulina Kogo. Her family was strongly Catholic and on February 6, 1949, she was baptized at the St. Joseph’s Catholic Church Chepterit by the presiding priest Fr. John Daley. She was given the name 'Filomena' which in later life she spelt Philomena. Chelagat was born into a politically active family. Her father had been at one time a member of the Nandi Local Native Council (LNC) council at Kapsabet. Her uncle Michael Kibet Rongoei had served in the Rift Valley Regional Assembly and also at the Sirikwa County Council as a councillor. Her maternal uncle William Morogo Saina would later become the Eldoret North member of Parliament and whom she would succeed when she joined politics. Her older brother Eng Jan Mutai (1945–2020) was a prominent public servant who was at one time the Managing Director of the giant Kenya Posts & Telecommunications Corporation (KPTC).

== Education ==
Chelagat began her early education at Terige Primary School in 1956. She studied there until 1960 when she proceeded to Chepterit Primary School founded by Catholic missionaries in Nandi. She was a pupil there until 1962 when she sat and passed her Kenya African Preliminary Examination (KAPE). The following year 1963, she proceeded to St. Joseph’s Girls Secondary School Chepterit also ran by the Mill Hill missionaries in Nandi. In 1966 she sat and passed her fourth-form East Africa Certificate of Education (EACE). Her leadership skills and activism became quite apparent in her school years. While in secondary school, she was quite vocal against the excesses of the administration and led boycotts to classes if she thought their rights were infringed. She would often be sent home for being headstrong but her activism was mitigated by her exceptional intelligence always being top of her class. Despite being constantly absent from school, she passed her examinations at Chepterit and proceeded to Highlands Girls High School in Eldoret which is today Moi Girls High School Eldoret. Even in her new school, she stood up to her school administration and got her in trouble several times. She even had to sit her A-levels finals from outside the school after causing trouble to the administration. Again she passed very well and was admitted to the University of Nairobi in 1970 for a degree course in political Science.

== Life at the University ==
Chelagat became one of the first Kalenjin women to be admitted to the newly-established University of Nairobi. She reported at the main campus in September 1970 to begin her degree program. Prior to that, she had secured a temporary job at the leading newspaper in Nairobi, The East African Standard, as a reporter. She conducted her reportage mainly in Nairobi. She resigned just prior to joining the university after only six months on the job. At that point, there were very few women on campus and even fewer from her Kalenjin ethnic community. In spite of her then ‘minority’ status, her campus presence was quite prominent as she had a natural gift of public speaking delivering fiery speeches during kamukunjis or informal student meetings held to address emerging issues affecting students.

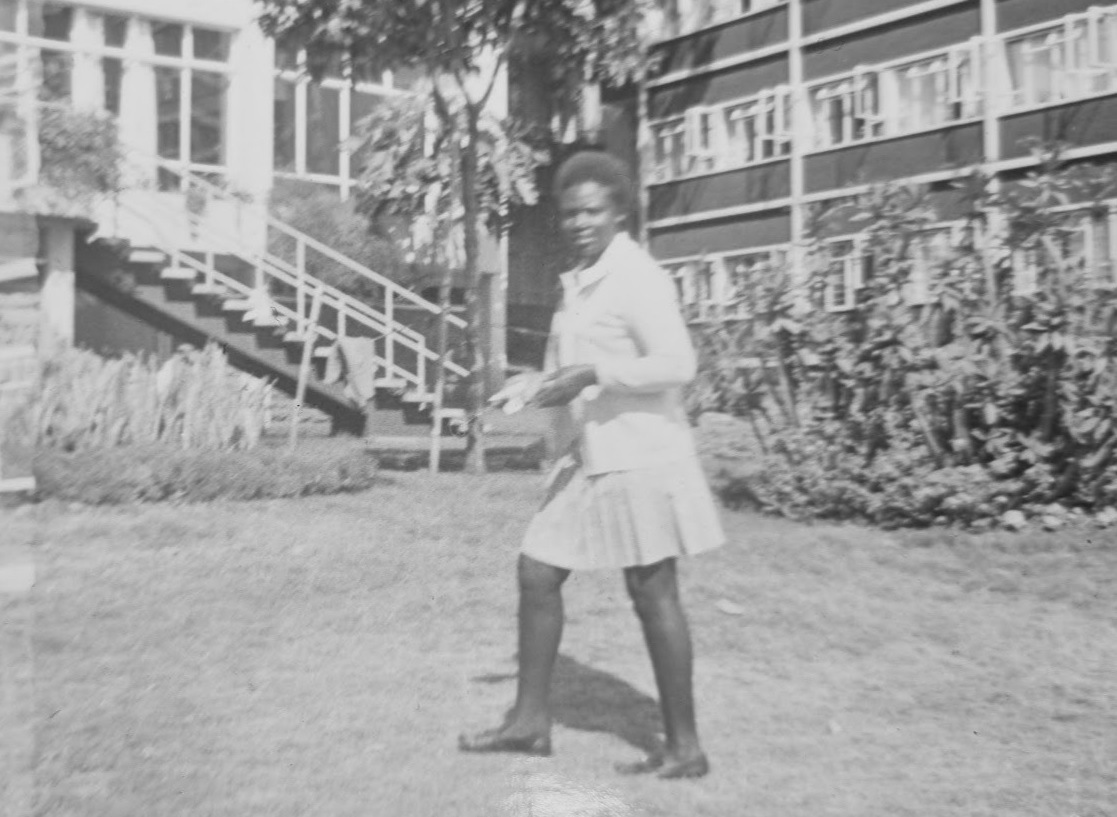
Chelagat Mutai at the University of Nairobi 1971

By 1972, she was deeply involved in student politics and became the first female editor of the Student Magazine The Anvil. She took advantage of her background in Journalism to write articles critical of the university administration and the decisions affecting student welfare. Early in 1973, she published sensational reports in her paper and which were blamed for sparking student rioting at the University. She was summarily expelled and ordered out of campus. She had just began her third year with one semester to go. With no prospects for employment in Nairobi, she returned to her native Terige in Nandi County and began teaching at the local secondary school.

== Denial of Passport ==
Recognizing her enormous potential, one of the American expatriate lecturers with whom she had become acquainted, organized for a full scholarship to Harvard University. She was meant to report in September 1973 to continue with where she had left. After doing the paperwork, her letter of admission and ticket arrived shortly. All she needed was a passport. The Kenya Immigration Department was under the Home Affairs ministry, headed by then Vice President Daniel Arap Moi. Despite several visits to the office, she learnt from one of the officers that Moi had personally called up her file and withheld the issuance of the passport. Chelagat went to see him about her passport and despite what she did to plead with him, he flatly refused to have it issued. Not one to give up so easily, she organized for a relative of hers named Stanley Some who personally knew Vice President Moi to plead her case before him. Some worked at the Kenya Airforce as a civilian employee. He made his way to see Moi by this time, Moi refused and that was the end of the story.

== Political activism ==
Chelagat’s political tribulations with the Kenyatta regime begun way back when she was a student at Highlands Girls High School. Vice President Moi was already the chairman of the board. Chelagat had been identified as a trouble maker by the school administration. In a display of extra-ordinary courage she once had a heated argument with her European school Principal and was suspended from school. She was suspended and stayed home for a while before returning to the school, and even then, became top of her class. Her agitative personality was strongly mitigated by her extreme intelligence. She was effortlessly at the top of her class whatever the challenge was. Moi was to be the one to hand her the Merit awards during the prize-giving days. Her suspension was not her first, she had been suspended at her O-Levels school Chepterit Girls for ‘answering back her teachers.’ She was also suspended in her A-Levels school for taking on the school principal and even in the University she would be expelled for her activism. At the East African Standard, she wrote several stories highlighting the political and social situations of that time. It was from her stint in journalism that she was appointed the editor of the college magazine, but it was her work there that got her expulsion from the University. Her big break came when she won her scholarship to Harvard during her time in suspension. Her inability to obtain a passport because of political reasons made her lose out on the scholarship. She quietly returned to her home village and taught at a nearby secondary school.

== Entering politics ==
After her plans to travel to America were thwarted, she petitioned the Education Minister Taaita Toweett, who reversed her expulsion and so she was able to complete her university education in 1974. It was during her time at the University of Nairobi that she became acquainted with firebrand Tinderet MP Jean-Marie Seroney, who was giving the Kenyatta administration sleepless nights. During that time, her uncle the Eldoret North MP William Morogo Saina who was also a great friend of Seroney, was jailed on charges of theft of spare parts for farming machinery. Chelagat Mutai, barely out of University, Seroney asked her to ran for the Eldoret North seat in the upcoming general elections. Seroney was now her political protégé. The General Elections were called for October 14, 1974. This was only the second time Kenya was holding a General Election under the Kanu Government. Nationally, a total of 733 candidates were vying for 158 seats with fifteen candidates being women. Scared of her political debut, Seroney reassured her and even promised that he would campaign for her. But on their first rally in Ziwa, Seroney only introduced her to the people and left her alone. She had been thrust to the deep end of the pool. Being the only female candidate, she traversed the constituency making impassioned speeches and began to turn heads against more seasoned politicians. With a field of 11 male contestants, she emerged top with 10,432 votes representing 40.20% of the valid votes cast. She was not only one of just four women elected to Parliament but was the youngest person ever elected in Kenya at that point. She was 25 years, 8 months, 2 weeks and 1 day. Her record as the youngest elected woman, remained until August 9, 2022, when Linet Chepkorir Toto broke the record when at 24 she was elected to become the woman representative for Bomet County. Chelagat’s record remained for 47 years, 9 months, 3 weeks, and 5 days. Her was only broken posthumously. She was also the first Kalenjin woman to be elected to Parliament, a record that she held until 2002 with the election of Alice Chelaite as Rongai MP on a Narc ticket.

== Political prisoner ==
When Seroney was detained on October 15, 1975, Chelagat Mutai was by his side and had earlier in the day notified the House of the presence of ‘strangers’ in Parliamentary precincts. She told the House that they “intended to arrest Seroney.” It turned out that they were plain-clothed police officers who were under instructions to arrest Seroney and Martin Shikuku. After their arrest, Chelagat would be the one person who constantly championed for their freedom on the floor of the House. Seroney’s family came to her seeking assistance to get the State to grant them access to him. Mutai became the new thorn in the flesh for the State. Mutai’s own tribulations were not too far off. In January 1976 she voted against a Constitutional amendment designed to give more powers to the President. A few days later on January 25, 1976, she was arrested and charged with incitement when squatters in her constituency invaded a sisal farm that the owner had actually sold to them. After receiving the money, the owner apparently developed cold feet and failed to transfer the land to the rightful purchasers leading to the impatient squatters to invade. Chelagat had brokered the deal and had personally paid the land owner every last cent he had demanded. "I personally presented hundreds of worn old notes in various denominations from the squatters for the purchase of the land.” And even after the squatters had moved in, it was convenient for the State to bring up charges against her just after voting against the crucial amendment.

== The Ziwa Sisal farm 'invasion' ==
On September 12, 1975, Chelagat held a meeting with the squatters at the Ziwa Estate Sisal Plantation and had even invited Seroney as the chief guest at a fundraiser held at Kerotet primary school . In Keya’s history, Squatterism was introduced by the colonial government to ensure steady supply of labour in farms. Africans were compelled to leave their villages to live as labour squatters on a section of the farm to provide labour to the settler farmer. At Independence in 1963, most squatters found themselves landless and yet they could not take possession of the land they had occupied for many years as it had been sold to new owners. Many of them, who had historical claims to the land they occupied, ended up landless as their income was often too little or too erratic to purchase any land. The more proactive ones put together the little money they had to buy out the farms once owned by the settler farmers. This was the case with the Ziwa Sisal plantation owned by an Asian farmer. Shortly after the meeting, the squatters invaded the farm and apportioned themselves to it according to their shareholding. Instead of being arrested immediately; they waited a good four months after the event. Her arrest came just three months after Seroney’s detention and she opposing a Government Bill.

=== Defense against the State ===
Chelagat was arrested and detained at a Nairobi police station awaiting trial. She was charged with incitement to violence in Nakuru before Senior Resident Magistrate V.S. Dhir. She pleaded not guilty and her lawyer Paul Birech tried to have her granted bail but the magistrate declined. The trial was fixed for February 10, 1976, meaning that she would be remanded for two weeks before the trial. Her advocate Paul Birech pleaded with the magistrate that she would even report to the police daily if that would satisfy the magistrate that she deserved to be granted bail. He declined. From then on, her court appearances would be from prison. Even as a detainee, Seroney would be produced in court as her defense witness but that did not help. Chelagat changed her defense team bringing in legal giants Lee Muthoga and S.M. Otieno who put up a spirited fight for her freedom. She lost the case and was sentenced to two and a half years by Dhir. She was committed to the Langata Women’s Prison on March 10, 1976, and served time also at the Nakuru Prison. She immediately lodged a new case at the High Court before Justice Allan Hancox and Justice James Wicks. She lost the case yet again. She then moved to the East Africa Court of Appeal then based in Dar es Salaam. Her case came before Justices Samuel Wambuzi, Abdulla Mustafa and Eric Ewan Law. The Appellate Court issued its ruling on May 6, 1977, upholding the decision of the lower court. By this time she had already served a year in prison.

=== Time in Prison ===
During her time in jail, her close confidante, the Kitutu MP George Anyona fought for her welfare. Apparently, Chelagat’s family and some MPs had numerously been denied the chance to see her but Anyona pushed the State hard getting limited access to her. Chelagat served her time in jail in full and did not get parole or presidential pardon as many short-term inmates would. She confined mostly in solitary and being let out to the working yard where she was tasked to breaking rocks using a heavy hammer. It was backbreaking work and she would later learn that Vice President Moi (who was in charge of the Prisons system) had personally designed her work schedule and the work load. She was also taken to solitary confinement and did hard labour on the prison’s farms while all the others, some of whom served time for bigger offences, had lighter duty serving in Nairobi’s industrial plants.

== Return to Politics ==
As a result of her time in prison, she lost her Eldoret North seat in accordance with the February 1966 Constitutional change that provided that an MP failing to attend eight consecutive House sittings would lose their seat. On June 25, 1977, Eldoret farmer Nicanor Kimurgor araap Sirma won the by-election by polling 2,339 votes in an election marked by extremely low voter turn-out. On September 9, 1978, she was released and by this time, Moi had become president. She was released just in time to run for it during the 1979 elections. She contested the 1979 Election for her old seat and returned to Parliament while her erstwhile Seroney lost his seat. In the election of 1979, she effortlessly ousted Sirma.

=== Further troubles ===
Her victory did not settle well with the Moi administration as she was still considered a rebel. She maintained her criticism of the government and was vocal about the government's inadequate response during the 1980 famine. It was not long before she got into trouble. In September 1981 she received some confidential information that she was going to be arrested following accusations of inflated mileage claims from Parliament for her car. She was not alone, several other MPs were under investigation but those perceived to be anti-government, were targeted. On September 19, 1981, Nakuru North MP Koigi wa Wamwere and Kitutu East MP Abuya Abuya and Wundanyi MP Mashengu Mwachofi demanded to know in Parliament why they were under investigation by the police. They informed the House that Chelagat Mutai and Nyando MP Onyango Midika, Bungoma South MP Lawrence Sifuna and Lurambi South MP, Wasike Ndombi were all under investigation. All of them were outspoken critics of the Government. The following day she presented herself to the police who took statements from her and bonded her to appear in court. On September 21, 1981, was charged with 48 counts of making false mileage claims amounting to Sh. 69,345. She denied the charges before Chief Magistrate Fidahussein E. Abdullah and was released on a Sh. 50,000 bond. The hearing was fixed for November 16, 1981. The prosecution was led by Deputy Public Prosecutor Sharad Rao while her defense was led by lawyer Kirumba Mwaura. But she knew full well that she was going to be jailed, and it did not matter whether the claims were true or not. Remembering the harrowing experiences she had had in her last stint in jail, she did not want to take chances and opted for self-imposed exile. She quietly took a bus and traveled incognito southwards towards the border with Tanzania. She arrived at the Namanga border post and crossed into Tanzania ending up in Dar es Salaam. On arrival, she reported to authorities in Dar that she had fled Kenya. On October 19, 1981, a warrant of arrest was issued by Chief Magistrate Mr. Fidahussein Abdullah after she failed to appear in Court. Several questions were asked in Parliament about her disappearance with many fearing that she may have been abducted or even killed. However, on October 29, 1981, the Minister for Internal Security G.G. Kariuki announced in Parliament that Mutai had fled the country to Tanzania. After she had stayed away from Parliament for eight consecutive sittings, Speaker Fred Mati declared her seat vacant. In the by-election to replace her, her uncle William Morogo Saina was barred by the ruling party Kanu from contesting and this gave a chance to the eventual winner Nicanor Kimurgor Sirma.

== Life in Exile ==
Upon arrival in Tanzania, she was summoned by the authorities and questioned as to why she had defected. They were kind to her and warmly received her. Geopolitically, Kenya and Tanzania were seriously at odds after the collapse of the East Africa Community in 1977. This informed Chelagat’s choice of Tanzania to go to exile because the chances of extradition low. After her interrogation, she was taken to meet Tanzania's President Julius Nyerere himself and described to him what was happening to her. He inquired about the political situation in Kenya. Mwalimu Nyerere ordered that she be given a job and she chose to work as a journalist. She was assigned to one of the biggest newspapers in Tanzania where her duties were mainly editorial. Nyerere ignored Kenya’s pleas for her extradition. After days of speculation, particularly in Kenya, Tanzania’s Home Affairs minister Brig. Muhidin Kimario confirmed Chelagat’s presence in Tanzania. On November 11, 1981, Attorney General Joseph Kamere made a formal request for her repatriation from Tanzania but Brig. Kimario stated that Chelagat’s request for political asylum was being considered under existing international regulations. Brigaider General Kimario, who was a hero of the just-concluded Tanzania-Uganda War that saw the ouster of Uganda's Idi Amin, declined to extradite Chelagat.

Even though she was far away, she followed Kenyan politics closely. During the planning for the registration of a new party organized by George Anyona and Oginga Odinga, Anyona met Seroney in a bid to recruit him but he (Seroney) opted out of it and instead kept a low political profile. They agreed that Chelagat would be a good support for the new party. Together with Seroney, Anyona made a telephone call to her appealing to her to return to Kenya and take up a part in the proposed opposition party but she politely declined.

The bid to launch that Party – known as the Kenya African Socialist Alliance (KASA), landed George Anyona in jail and Oginga Odinga in house arrest. On June 2, 1982, Anyona was arrested as he made his way to a local hotel to announce the formation of the new party. He was detained without trial for several years. If Chelagat had agreed and come back, she would, without a doubt, have ended up in jail as well. The phone call with Seroney was the first time that she spoke with him since she had fled. It was going to be their last. Seroney died on December 6, 1982, under mysterious circumstances.

== Life after exile ==
Chelagat remained in exile until 1984, and after judging that the political situation in Kenya had cooled, she returned. Chelagat opted to remain in quietude watching the unfolding political situation without uttering a word. She rejoined the KANU party and was appointed to a position at the Kenya Commercial Bank working at the KICC in Nairobi (then KANU Headquarters). She was later appointed to the Standing Committee on Human Rights but was dismissed through a radio bulletin in June 1999 by President Moi. She returned to live at her father's farm.

== Illness and death ==
In a 2006 road accident Chelagat suffered multiple injuries and fractures. She was also diagnosed with a spinal problem which she nursed but kept recurring. She became unable to walk. She moved to Nairobi for treatment but her circumstances took a turn for the worse she ended up living in a single room belonging to a friend in a low-income suburb of Nairobi. In June 2011 she was admitted to the Spinal Injury Hospital following the intervention of former Prime Minister Raila Odinga. She continued recuperating in a flat at Ngong Road arranged for her by benefactors. Weeks later, she was admitted to the hospital with acute pneumonia. She was discharged after a week and returned home, but her condition worsened and was rushed back. On July 6, 2013, she quietly died in the hospital.

== Legacy ==
Chelagat Mutai fought for constitutional freedoms, rule of law, and fought against corruption, abuse of power and political assassinations. She stood for social justice and was a powerful defender of democracy and women’s rights and paid for it with her term in jail and exile. Coming from a highly patriarchal society and being a single woman, she overcame the odds to become the first Kalenjin woman elected to Parliament and also the youngest person in her time. She was a great inspiration to women and youth. The 10th Parliament (2008-2013) saw the election of the largest number of Kalenjin women under the old Constitution. Out of 22 women elected to the 10th Parliament, one-third (seven in number) were elected from predominantly Kalenjin constituencies contributing the largest percentage of women drawn from a single community. These were Beatrice Kones, Prof.Hellen Sambili, Joyce Laboso, Linah Jebii Kilimo, Prof. Margaret Kamar, Peris Simam, and Dr. Sally Kosgey. Joyce Laboso went on to become the first woman Deputy Speaker in the Kenyan Parliament.

The death of Chelagat Mutai was epochal, as it marked the fall of one of the ‘Seven Bearded Sisters’, a moniker attributed to former Attorney-General Charles Njonjo describing dissident members of the Kenyan parliament. These persons raised important issues that affected Kenyans and which the Kenyatta administration did not quite like. Members of that motley crew included Koigi wa Wamwere, Lawrence Sifuna, Abuya Abuya, Chelagat Mutai, George Anyona, James Orengo, Chibule wa Tsuma and Mashengu wa Mwachofi. She is a hero of the second liberation even though she died in penury unable to benefit from her many years of social activism. The Constitution of Kenya 2010 bears the voices of many social and political activists over the years. It bears Chelagat’s voice too.
