= Gatundu Constituency =

Former Kenyan electoral constituency

Gatundu
- Former constituency for the Parliament of Kenya
- District: Kiambu District

Former constituency
- Created: 1966
- Abolished: 1997
- Number of members: One
- Created from: Thika–Gatundu
- Replaced by: Gatundu North & Gatundu South

Gatundu was an electoral constituency in Kiambu District. Created for the 1966 general elections, it is one of the original constituencies of Kiambu District. The constituency was abolished before the 1997 Kenyan general election, and split into Gatundu North and Gatundu South constituencies.

Kenya's first president Jomo Kenyatta was the first Member of Parliament from 1963 until his death in 1978.

== Members of Parliament ==
Elections	MP	Party	Notes
1963	Jomo Kenyatta	KANU	Jomo Kenyatta also elected Prime Minister of Kenya.
1974	Jomo Kenyatta	KANU	Jomo Kenyatta also elected President of Kenya unopposed.
1979	Ngengi Muigai	KANU	
1983	Ngengi Muigai	KANU	
1988	Zachary Kimemia Gakunju	KANU	
1992	Anthony Kamuiru Gitau	Ford	Constituency abolished in 1997
