= Party of Independent Candidates of Kenya =

Political party in Kenya

The Party of Independent Candidates of Kenya (PICK) is a political party in Kenya.

== History ==
PICK was established in 1992 by former Olympic Shooter John Harun Mwau. Mwau ran as the party's presidential candidate in the December 1992 general elections, finishing seventh in a field of eight candidates with 0.2% of the vote. In the parliamentary elections, the party received 0.8% of the vote, winning one seat in the National Assembly.

The party did not nominate a presidential candidate in the 1997 elections, and also lost its seat in the National Assembly. It remained seatless after the 2002 elections, but won two seats in 2007 with 0.9% of the vote; amongst its 47 candidates, Mwau was successful in Kilome and Clement Kungu Waibara in Gatundu North. Despite nominating 44 National Assembly candidates, it lost both seats in the 2013 elections, in which it received 0.45% of the vote; Mwau unsuccessfully ran for a seat in the Senate in Makueni County.
