= Shem Ochuodho =

Kenyan politician

Shem Odongo Ochuodho is a Kenyan politician. He represented Rangwe constituency in Homa-Bay County between 1997 and 2002, and later became a computer consultant. He also serves as the chair of Kenya Diaspora Association.

== Career ==
Ochoduo attended the University of Nairobi and the University of York.

Ochuodho was elected to parliament in 1997, on an NDP ticket beating the late Phelgona Okundi of KANU. He was the founding convener and secretary of the National Alliance (NA), which gave birth to the National Alliance for Change (NAC), that in turn gave rise to the National Rainbow Coalition (NARC). While in parliament, he helped bring the internet to Kenya, on 24 October 1995, and helped create its first website, a summary of the news. In late 2000, he was sentenced to two years in jail for assaulting and burning two vehicles owned by politician Philgona Okundi. He was imprisoned in Kodiaga, and after being refused access to his attorneys, he refused to eat for five days. He was later released on a $100,000 bond. He ran for the Deputy President in the March 2013 Kenyan Presidential election on a Safina party ticket. He was the running mate to Paul Muite.

In 2007, Ochuodho received the Kenyan Community Abroad Excellence Award.

Ochuodo is a former advisor of the Economic, Social and Cultural Council. In June 2022, he and six other members were suspended from the council, following internal investigations which uncovered them conspiring to disband the council. He was suspended without warning. In 2023, he sued the council for "violating his rights and freedoms".

Ochuodho is former managing director of the Kenya Pipeline Company (KPC). He and two other men were later sued for fraud, and were ordered to pay fines totalling KSh827 million. The fines were dropped in 2014, but were reinstated in 2020, after bribery was discovered during investigations. In 2025, he was ordered to testify before a court for accused corruption while at KPC.

== Publications ==
- Dawn of a Rainbow, The Untold Intrigues of Kenya's First Coalition Government (2012).
