= China Square =

Retail store in Nairobi, Kenya

China Square is a business hub located at Unicity Mall, next to Kenyatta University along Thika Road, Kenya. The mall became popular in Kenya for selling electronics, clothing, and different household items at lower costs than local stores.

== Controversial closure ==
After only one month of operating in Kenya, rival traders started complaining about prices and Kenya's Trade Minister, Moses Kuria, reinstated that Chinese investors would be supported as manufacturers not traders. The Kenyan Trade Minister announced plans to lease the site to the competing small traders and support China Square owners in setting up a manufacturing plant in Kenya in order to work with distribution partnerships with traders in Eastleigh, Kamukunji, Muthurwa, River Road Traders, Gikomba, and Nyamakima.

On February 26, 2023, China Square announced it will be closed indefinitely. The company initially cited public safety issues due to the high volume of traffic, shortage of tills and not being able to meet customer expectations. Before closing, the mall reportedly sold Sh10 million ($78,678) worth of goods daily.

The Kenya China Chamber of Commerce (KCCC) criticized Trade Cabinet Secretary for proposing buying China Square's lease and evicting its owner without consultation, and violating Kenya's policy on having an unbiased environment for trade and investments.

== Branches ==
=== Nairobi ===
- Unicity Mall, Thika Road
- Waterfront Mall, Karen Road
- Greenspan Mall, Dakar Road
- Two Rivers Mall, Limuru Road
- Hyper Mall, Langata Link Rd

=== Mombasa ===
- Nyali Bazaar Mall, Fidel Castro Odinga Road

=== Kisumu ===
- Mega City Mall, Kisumu
