= Ng'enda ward =

Ng'enda ward is one of four wards in Gatundu South Constituency, Central Province, Kenya. It is neighbour to Juja and Ruiru on the east. It consists of several location i.e. Kahugu-ini, Ngenda, Kimunyu and Kiamwangi. Ngenda is home to first president of Kenya Jomo Kenyatta and other prominent businessmen. Ngenda has high urbanisation rate, evident by good roads linking to Thika superhighway, hospital like Ngenda and Gatundu hospital, shopping center like Kahuguini (kabe), Gathage, Karembu, and Kiamwangi.

Kahugu-ini location is made up of Githima Village, Ahuguini, Wamita, Chigeini, Gatwikira villages.
