= Kariuki =

Kariuki is a surname. Notable people with the surname include:

- George Macharia Kariuki, Kenyan politician and MP
- Gina Din Kariuki (born 1961), Kenyan businesswoman
- Godffrey Gitahi Kariuki, Kenyan politician
- Jemimah Kariuki, Kenyan doctor
- John Ngata Kariuki, Kenyan politician and businessman
- Josiah Mwangi Kariuki (1929–1975), Kenyan socialist politician during the administration of the Jomo Kenyatta government
- Julius Kariuki (born 1961), Kenyan athlete
- Kellen Kariuki, Kenyan accountant and businesswoman
- Muthui Kariuki (born 1956), Kenyan journalists
- Patrick Kariuki Muiruri (born 1945), Kenyan politician
