= Muiruri =

Muiruri is a surname. Notable people with the surname include:

- John Muiruri (born 1979), Kenyan footballer
- Patrick Kariuki Muiruri (born 1945), Kenyan politician
