= Kabetwa =

- Location within Kenya
- Coordinates: 1.15°N 35.63°E
- Country: Kenya
- Province: Rift Valley Province
- Time zone: UTC+3 (EAT)

Kabetwa is a rural community in Kenya's Rift Valley Province. It is in Tot, Marakwet East Sub-County. It has a primary school.
