= St. Paul's Gekano =

Extra-county school in Nyamira, Kenya

Coordinates: 0.6847°S 34.9182°E

St. Paul's Gekano Boys' High School
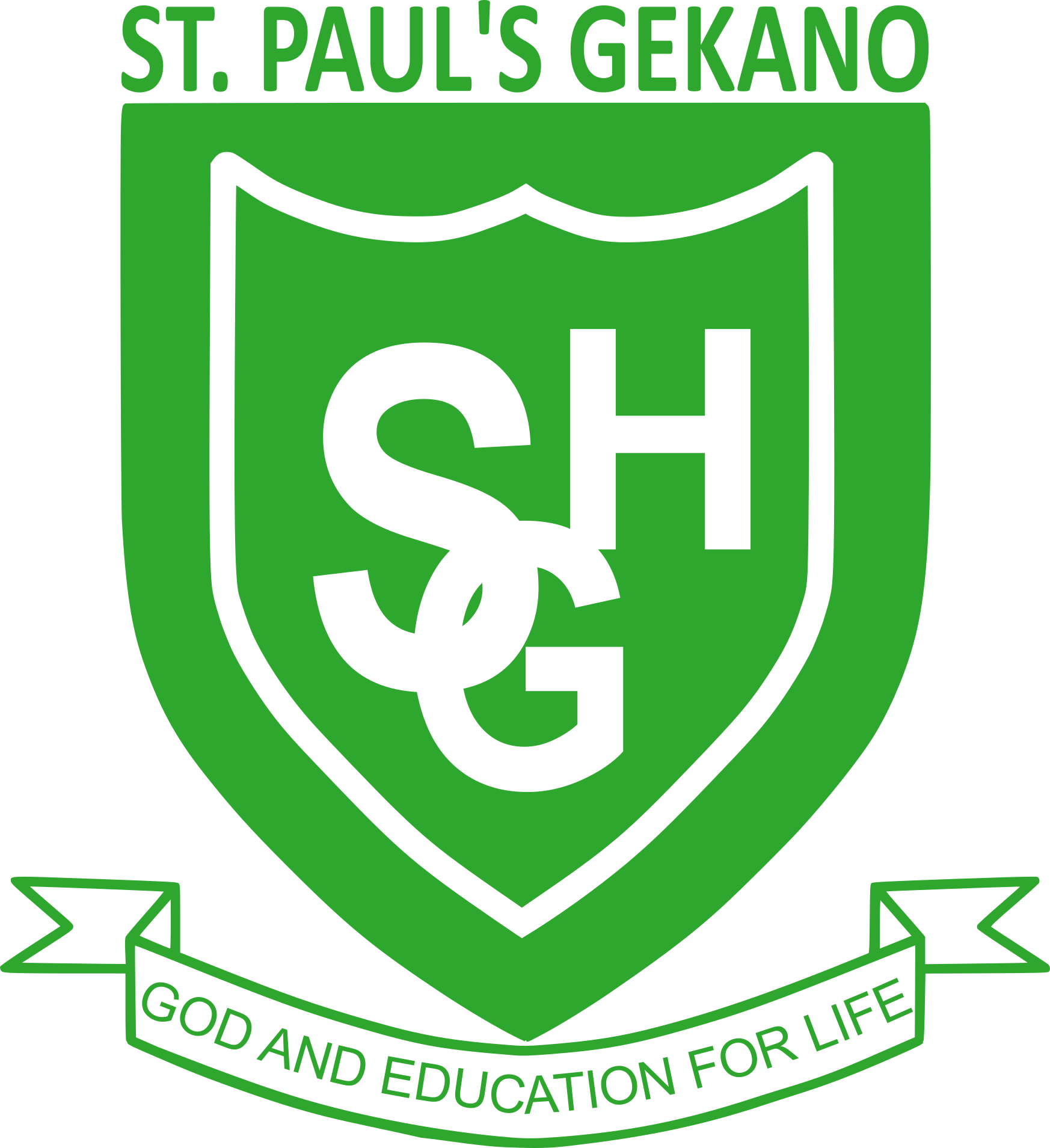
- Nyamira; Kenya

Information
- Type: Extra-County, Boys, Public
- Motto: God and Education for Life
- Established: 1964
- Principal: Mr. Evans Mogere
- Colors: Green, Yellow, Grey and White
- Website: stpaulsgekano.sc.ke

St. Paul's Gekano is an extra-county school located in Nyamira County, Kenya. St. Paul's Gekano was started in 1964 by the Catholic Diocese of Kisii under the headship of Rev. Father Tiberius Charles Mogendi. Records indicate that it is the oldest established secondary school in Nyamira County. It is a boys' school offering secondary education of the Kenya education system. The school offers boarding facilities to all the students.

== Notable alumni ==
- Hon. Timothy Bosire – MP, Kitutu Masaba Constituency (2013–2017)
- Lawrence Adams (Larry)
- Sorobi Moturi Erastus(Radio Presenter – Egesa FM – Royal Media Services)
- Kipsang Ngeno Manager
- Dr.Daniel Atuke GLUK
- Prof.Edward Ontita UoN
- Adv George Mboga
- Nyauma Nyasani UN
- Thomas Nyamao Accountant
- Ken Oenga UK
- Ken Osinde UN
- Prof Richard Onwonga UoN
- Dr Edward Okumu USA
- Mishael Ondieki USA
- Dr Benard Oeri UAE
- Dr Benard Marasa USA
- John Omonywa Foreign Affairs
- Henry Ongondi USA
- Dr Neford Ongaro MTRH
- Harun Motongwa Canada
- Edward Mokaya Canada
