= Marakwet East Constituency =

Electoral constituency in Kenya, formerly Kerio East Constituency

Marakwet East
- constituency for the Parliament of Kenya
- Marakwet East Constituency within Elgeyo/Marakwet County

- Elgeyo/Marakwet County within Kenya
- County: Elgeyo-Marakwet
- Population: 97,041
- Area: 853 km^{2} (329.3 sq mi)

Current constituency
- Number of members: 1
- Party: UDA
- Member of Parliament: David Kangogo Bowen
- Wards: 4

Marakwet East is an electoral constituency in Kenya. It is one of four constituencies of Elgeyo-Marakwet County. Between 1992 and 2012, the constituency had eleven wards, all of which elected councillors for the defunct Marakwet County Council. However, after the promulgation of the new constitution, the constituency was subdivided into four wards: Embobut/Embolot, Endo, Kapyego, and Sambirir.

From 1963 to 1992, the constituency was known as Kerio North (not to be confused with Keiyo North, a constituency in the former Keiyo district). The name was changed to Kerio East in 1992. In 1997, the constituency was renamed Marakwet East.

== Members of Parliament Since Independence ==
Period	MP	Popular Name	Party
1963 - 1969	Vincent Komen Too	Arap Too	KANU
1969 - 1974	Erick Cheserek	Erick	KANU
1974 - 1979	Vincent Komen Too	Arap Too	KANU
1979 - 1983	Vincent Komen Too	Arap Too	KANU
1983 - 1988	Robert Kiptoo Kipkorir	Kasertich	KANU
1988 - 1992	Robert Kiptoo Kipkorir	Kasertich	KANU
1992 - 1997	Fredrick Kisang Cheserek	Chabat	KANU
1997- 2002	John Kiptoo Marirmoi	Marrirmoi	KANU
2002 - 2007	Linah Jebii Kilimo	Ma-Jebiwott	NARC
2007 - 2012	Linah Jebii Kilimo	Ma-Jebiwott	KENDA
2013 - 2017	David Kangogo Bowen	Kakuko	URP
2017 - 2022	David Kangogo Bowen	Kakuko	JP
2022 - Present	David Kangogo Bowen	Kakuko	UDA

== Wards (1992 - 2012) ==
1. Embobut
2. Embolot
3. Endo
4. Kaptich
5. Kapyego
6. Kipkaner
7. Koibirir
8. Mokoro
9. Mon
10. Murkutwo
11. Sambirir

Ward	Previous Wards Merged
Embobut/Embolot	Embobut, Embolot
Endo	Endo, Mokoro
Kapyego	Kaptich, Kapyego
Sambirir	Sambirir, Kipkaner, Mon, Murkutwo, Koibirir
