= Gatundu North Constituency =

Kenyan electoral constituency

Gatundu North
- constituency for the Parliament of Kenya
- Gatundu North Constituency within Kiambu County

- Kiambu County within Kenya
- County: Kiambu
- Population: 109,870
- Area: 286 km^{2} (110.4 sq mi)

Current constituency
- Number of members: 1
- Party: Independent
- Member of Parliament: Elijah Njoroge Kururia
- Wards: 4

Gatundu North Constituency is an electoral constituency in Kenya. It is one of twelve constituencies in Kiambu County. The constituency has four wards, all of which are within Thika County Council. The constituency was established for the 1997 elections. Previously it was part of the larger Gatundu Constituency.

== Members of Parliament ==
Elections	MP	Party	Notes and Notable Developments Initiated under MP's Tenure.
1963–1978	Jomo Kenyatta	KANU	
1979	Ngengi Muigai	KANU	
1983	Ngengi Muigai	KANU	Ngengi Water Pipeline
1988	Zachary Kimemia Gakunju	KANU	
1992	Anthony Kamuiru Gitau	Ford Asili Party	
1997	Patrick Kariuki Muiruri	SDP	Gatundu Constituency split to Gatundu North Constituency and Gatundu South Constituency
2002	Patrick Kariuki Muiruri	KANU	
2007	Clement Kungu Waibara	PICK	
2013	Kigo Francis Njenga	TNA	Upgrading of Gatukuyu/Kairi/Mataara Road to bitumen standards.
2017	Kibe Anne Wanjiku	Jp	Fiscal transparency, improved hygiene and learning infrastructure in government primary schools.
2022	Elijah Njoroge Kururia	Independent	Young and energetic leadership

Ward	Registered Voters	Mca/Councillor	Year	Mca/Councillor	Year	Mca/Councillor	Year	Mca/Councillor	Year	Mca/Councillor	Year	Mca/ Councillor	Year
Chania Ward	11,959	Nathan Wohoro	1997–2007	George Muthua	2007–2013	Martin Njoroge	2017–Present	–	2022 Kenyans Elections	–	2027 Kenyans Elections	–	2032 Kenyans Elections
Githobokoni Ward	11,412	Gabriel Wakahia Kabutu	1997–2007	Kamau Mwago	2007–2013	Moses	2013–2017	Njenga Kago	2017–Present	–	2022 Kenyans Elections	–	2027 Kenyans Elections
Gituamba Ward	9,925	George Waweru Kabunga	1997–2003	Joseph Ngandu Ruigu	2003–2007	Kariuki Ngarari	2007–2013	Samuel Njenga Kago	2013–2017	Mwangi Nduati	2017–Present	–	2022 Kenyans Elections
Mang'u Ward	12,407	Wandabi Ngugi	1997–Passed on –	Succeeded by Joseph Waweru Mbiruri	2003	Ndabi Kibicho	2003–2007	Richard Njoroge Mbuthia	2007–2013	Kimani Gacihi	2013–2017	Ndabi Kibicho	2017–Present
Total	45,703												
*September 2005.

== Economy of Gatundu North ==
Gatundu North Constituency comprises four Markets; Kamwangi, Gatukuyu, Kairi and Makwa. Kamwangi market and Gatukuyu market have dominated the rest of the Markets since Independence due to skewed distribution of resources and poor Infrastructure. As of October 2019 Kairi Market and Makwa market remain dormant. The main economic activity is agriculture, poultry farming and livestock. World Bank's FAO, National Agriculture and Rural Inclusive Growth Project NARIGP have shown willingness and commitment to support Banana farming which is the main lifeline of the majority of constituents. Most of these farmers are poorly funded. and as a result, the coffee sector in this area has also deteriorated in years to unsustainable levels.

== Karimenu 2 Dam ==
Karimenu 2 Dam is located 50 km west of Thika town. Upon completion by year 2020, the dam is expected to serve Areas of ruiru and juja with water for Irrigation and domestic use.

== NARIGP (National Agricultural and Rural Inclusive Growth Project ==
Gatundu North constituency was shortlisted as one of the beneficiaries of ksh 22.6 billion NARIGP World Bank Project.

== Health Care ==
Gatundu North has one Level 4 Hospital.
