= Kamunyaka =

- Location within Kenya
- Coordinates: 0.9°S 36.78°E
- Country: Kenya
- Province: Central Province

Population
  - Total: about 11,442 in githobokoni
- Time zone: UTC+3 (EAT)

Kamunyaka is a settlement in Thika District, Central Province, Kenya. It is next to the Kieni Forest.

It is part of Githobokini ward of Gatundu North Constituency and Thika County Council. It is a mostly Kikuyu-speaking community. Kamunyaka is an independent sub-location made up of several villages:

- Kageche - middle between Kihombi and Kiawangware
- Murundi - middle
- Kiawangware - far east
- Kihombi - middle between Kageche and Murundi
- Mucerere - right before Murundi
- Murundi - right before Mucerere
- Munyawa - far west (end)
- Kamithunu - next to Kamunyaka shopping Center
- Kianguruwe
