= Jimmy Wanjigi =

Kenyan businessman and political strategist (born 1962)

Jimi Wanjigi
- Born: 17 November 1962 (age 63); Kenya Colony
- Political party: Safina
- Father: Maina Wanjigi

Jimi Richard Wanjìgì (born on 17 November 1962) is a Kenyan businessman and political strategist.

He is the chief executive officer of Nanosol Africa Group of Companies, a privately held family office with interests in various sectors of the Kenyan economy including agri-business, financial services, industrials and real estate. He is however best known for being the key political strategist for Raila Odinga's 2017 election campaigns and the quiet force behind Uhuru Kenyatta's 2013 election victory.

== Early life and education ==
He was born on 17 November 1962. Wanjigi grew up around politics. His father, Maina Wanjigi served as a Member of Parliament and Cabinet Minister in Kenya's first two cabinets.

== Career ==
=== Business ===
He is currently the chief executive officer of Penter Group of Companies, a privately held family office with interests in various sectors of the Kenyan economy including agri-business, financial services, industrials and real estate. Jimi is a serial entrepreneur whose formal career in business begun in his early twenties when, after returning from University, he co-founded Kenya's first private garbage collection company, BINS Limited.

=== Political career ===
Jimi Wanjigi's alliance with politics started in 1992 during Kenya's first multi-party elections, where at a relatively young age, he got involved in Kenneth Matiba's election campaign. Wanjigi remained actively in politics behind the scenes during the years to come. He maintained a close friendship with the former vice president of Kenya George Saitoti until his death in June 2012. Following the death of Professor Saitoti in 2012, Jimmy moved his support to Uhuru Kenyatta and William Ruto for the presidency during the 2013 Kenyan general election. He played a pivotal role in brokering the alliance between Ruto's United Republican Party (Kenya) and Kenyatta's The National Alliance in 2012, leading to a joint ticket under what is now the Jubilee Party. He reportedly brokered the peace between Raila Odinga and Uhuru Kenyatta in the aftermath of the 2013 Kenyan general election.

In 2017, he shifted his political support to Raila Odinga, causing a public fall out between Wanjigi and President Uhuru Kenyatta. This led to severe backlash against Wanjigi from the state including a travel blockade, a dramatic 3 day assault by the Kenyan police on his Muthaiga home and politically motivated charges being brought against him and his octogenarian father. The charges were eventually thrown out by the courts. In February 2018, a fake obituary of Wanjigi ran in the Daily Nation, in what was viewed as a politically motivated death threat. He sued the media house and was awarded Shs. 8million in damages.

In mid 2021, Wanjigi announced that he would seek the Orange Democratic Movement's ticket to run for the Presidency of Kenya at the 2022 general election. His announcement is viewed as a challenge of party leader Raila Odinga's perceived automatic nomination to run on the Orange Democratic Movement's ticket, who has officially declared his 5th attempt to run for presidency. Wanjigi on the other hand who is running on a platform of bringing about an economic revolution, is a newcomer to elective politics and his candidature is likely to excite the Mount Kenya region. Currently his political party is Safina party.

== Personal life ==
Jimi is a son to former Kamukunji MP, and Cabinet Minister Maina Wanjigi. He's an alumnus of St. Mary's School, Nairobi where his schoolmates included Uhuru Kenyatta Jeff Koinange and Gideon Moi Following his non-graduation he returned to Kenya to pursue a career in business. He studied business from 1982 to 1986. Jimi is married to Irene Nzisa, and their two children study at Institut Le Rosey in Switzerland.
