= Elijah Kururia =

Kenyan politician

Elijah Njoroge Kururia MP

Member of Parliament for Gatundu North
- Incumbent
- Assumed office 9 August 2022
- Preceded by: Kibe Anne Wanjiku

Personal details
- Born: 1987 (age 38–39)
- Party: Independent
- Website: Parliamentary website Personal website

Elijah Njoroge Kururia is a Kenyan politician who is currently a member of the National Assembly for the Gatundu North constituency as an independent politician.

== Biography ==
Kururia was born to a 17-year-old mother in 1987, the eldest of 6 children. His mother picked tea and his father was a cook. He became a skilled piano player in his youth, and turned it into a career, playing at churches. With his connections in the church, Kururia entered the car importation industry and became very wealthy. Kururia graduated from St. Paul's University, Limuru in 2019 and the University of Nairobi in 2020. He served on the Kiambu County Assembly from 2017 to 2022. He garnered attention for campaigning in a helicopter, drawing large crowds.

== Political career ==
Kururia garnered controversy for thanking police officers who detained activist Gabriel Oguda in October 2024. He was banned from Bishop Ben Kiengei's church after voting for the controversial 2024 Kenya finance bill.
