= Muthaiga =

Neighbourhood in Nairobi, Kenya

- Location in Kenya
- Coordinates: 01°14′57″S 36°49′54″E
- Country: Kenya
- County: Nairobi County
- County division: Westlands Division
- Elevation: 5,640 ft (1,720 m)
- Climate: Af

Muthaiga is an affluent neighbourhood in the city of Nairobi. In 2019, media reports indicated that it was the most affluent and most expensive neighbourhood in the entire country.

== Location ==
Muthaiga is located approximately 7 kilometres (4 mi), by road, north of the city's central business district. The geographical coordinates of Muthaiga are:01°14'57.0"S, 36°49'54.0"E (Latitude:-1.249167; Longitude:36.831667).

== Overview ==
The neighbourhood is predominantly residential, with resort-style mansions, sitting on parcels of real estate measuring one acre or larger. The plots and homes are large and are developed according to strict neighbourhood guidelines established by the first British settlers in 1901. Security is maintained by the Kenya Police and a number of private security firms.

Land alone, depending on location and terrain, costs anywhere from KSh150 million to KSh200 million (US$1.5 million to $2 million) per acre, as of October 2019.

== History ==
In 1901, John Dawson Ainsworth, the first sub-commissioner in charge, followed the railway to establish a new town at Mile 327, the name adopted by railway engineers for Nairobi.

Ainsworth began to entice settlers to come to Nairobi. One of the earliest settlers who was lured by Ainsworth was Sandbach Baker. Baker, with his wife, Marie ‘Queenie’ Vera established Homestead Farm on the over 1,600 acres (2.5 mi^{2}) that he was granted by Ainsworth. The farm supplied dairy to Nairobi.

In 1903, Marie Vera Baker, who was in charge of Homestead Farm, leased 500 acres (0.78 mi^{2}) to other settlers, the first of whom was James Archibald Morrison. In 1912, due to Sandbach's failing health, the Bakers sold Morrison the whole of Muthaiga. At that time it measured 754 acres (1.178 mi^{2}). It fetched £20 an acre then. The Bakers returned to England. Morrison then began to subdivide the land into 10 acre and 50 acre lots, put in roads and piped water. He was a pioneer real estate developer.

The 1,600 acres that the Bakers were deeded in 1901 were part of the Karura Forest, an important cultural forest for the Kikuyu. The land was given to the Bakers, on condition that they supply dairy to Nairobi.

One of the modern amenities established by Morrison, the first real estate developer, is Muthaiga Country Club, opened in 1914, which still exists today. The name 'Muthaiga' was coined by Ward, one of the co-owners of Henderson and Ward Architects, the group who designed the neighbourhood plan in 1912. The plot that the architect bought had an African greenheart tree, whose bark was used as medicine by the Kikuyu, so he named the neighbourhood after that tree.

The house previously owned by the Bakers is now Gertrude’s Children’s Hospital.

== Notable residents ==
Several prominent individuals have their residence in Muthaiga, including businessman Jimmy Wanjigi; the third president of Kenya, Mwai Kibaki; HRH.Ron.K.K, Renowned Businessman and Mega philanthropist; and Kenyan businessman Manu Chandaria.
