= Gabriel Kagombe =

Kenyan politician

Gabriel Gathuka Kagombe is a Kenyan politician from the United Democratic Alliance. In the 2022 Kenyan general election, he was elected to succeed Moses Kuria as MP for the Gatundu South Constituency. Kagombe is a political science alumni from uon.

== Murder charges ==
In May 2024, Kagombe was arrested in connection to the shooting and death of boda boda rider, David Nduati, in Thika. He went into hiding after the incident and was located by police. The first time Gatundu South MP pled not guilty to the murder charges and was released on a Ksh. 1 million cash bail and an alternative bond of Ksh. 2 million and a surety of a similar amount on June 24, 2024 at Machakos High Court.

== See also ==
- 13th Parliament of Kenya
