= Kenya National Democratic Alliance =

Political party in Kenya

The Kenya National Democratic Alliance (KENDA) is a political party in Kenya.

== History ==
KENDA was established by David Mukaru-Ng'ang'a in 1992. Mukaru-Ng'ang'a ran as the party's presidential candidate in the December 1992 general elections, finishing last in a field of eight candidates with 0.2% of the vote. In the parliamentary elections, the party received only 771 votes, failing to win a seat in the National Assembly.

The party nominated Koigi wa Wamwere as its presidential candidate for the 1997 elections. He finished tenth out of fifteen candidates with 0.12% of the vote, whilst the party again failed to win a seat in the National Assembly.

KENDA was taken over by businessman Kamlesh Pattni in 2006, and the party fielded 170 candidates, including ten former MPs, in the 2007 general elections, the second highest number of candidates after the Orange Democratic Movement. However, the party won only one seat; Linah Kilimo in Marakwet East. In the 2013 elections KENDA nominated 13 National Assembly candidates, receiving 0.2% of the vote, losing its seat.
