= Seven Bearded Sisters =

The Seven Bearded Sisters was a term given to seven Kenyan opposition members of parliament (MPs) after Daniel arap Moi assumed power in 1978 following the death of Jomo Kenyatta. The seven were Abuya Abuya (Kitutu East), Onyango Midika (Nyando now Muhoroni), Mashengu wa Mwachofi (Wundanyi), James Orengo, Lawrence Sifuna (Bumula), Chibule wa Tsuma (Kaloleni) and Koigi wa Wamwere (Nakuru North, now Subukia). Others closely associated with the seven were George Anyona, Chelagat Mutai and Wasike Ndobi.

== Origin of the name ==
The name was coined by the then Kenyan attorney general Charles Njonjo in 1981. He picked it from the 1975 book The Seven Sisters: The Great Oil Companies and the World they Shaped by Anthony Sampson. The book was about how seven of the biggest oil companies in the world conspired to overthrow governments. Njonjo used the word 'bearded' to draw a comparison with Karl Marx, as he saw these MPs to uphold Marxist ideologies.

== Grievances ==
The MPs were left wing backbenchers who had been vocal in opposing most of the government's policies, especially what they saw as the government's close association with Western powers. The group was unofficial and most of them only knew each other through the motions they proposed and debated in parliament. They garnered most of their support in the student bodies of public universities, especially the powerful SONU (Student Organization of Nairobi University).

Most of the seven served time in detention and/ or went to exile. Orengo went to exile in Tanzania, Uganda and Zambia in the 1980s to escape the oppressive KANU regime.

Wamwere was sent to jail in 1982 for accusing the Moi government of ethnic discrimination and corruption. After his release in 1984, he went to exile in Uganda then later to Norway.

== Legacy ==
The MPs were the first in post-independent Kenya to openly and vocally defy the government in parliament. They laid the foundation for the fight for multi party democracy that would lead to the repeal of section 2A of the Kenyan constitution in 1992.
