= Patrick Kariuki Muiruri =

Kenyan politician (born 1945)

Member of Parliament for Gatundu North
- In office 1997–2007
- Preceded by: Constituency established
- Succeeded by: Clement Kungu Waibara

Assistant Minister of Production & Marketing

Personal details
- Born: December 5, 1945 (age 80)
- Occupation: Politician

Patrick Kariuki Muiruri (born 5 December 1945) served in the Kenyan parliament for 10 years (1997–2007) representing Gatundu North Constituency. He was the first member of the constituency after it was split from the larger Gatundu Constituency. Muiruri also served as an assistant minister of Production & Marketing in the Ministry of Agriculture.

He lost his seat as Gatundu North Member of parliament to Clement Kungu Waibara in 2007.
