= Kenya Social Congress =

Political party in Kenya

The Kenya Social Congress (KSC) is a political party in Kenya. Its symbol is a broom. The party is currently led by Samson Atati Kengere, with Dennis Anyoka as deputy leader.

== History ==
The KSC was established in June 1992 by activist George Anyona. Anyona, who had previously served in Parliament, had been imprisoned by the governments of Jomo Kenyatta and Daniel arap Moi from 1977 to 1978, again from 1982 to 1984, and finally from 1990 to 1992. While he was expected to join FORD-Kenya, he instead created his own party. Anyona had wanted to name the party "Kenya National Congress", but the name had already been taken. The party was created in opposition to the rule of KANU and Daniel arap Moi. Unlike FORD-Kenya, the KSC had a much smaller support base and was immune to the fragmentation typical of larger opposition movements. As is typical of Kenyan political parties, the KSC lacks institutionalization and was historically dominated by Anyona and the party founders.

Anyona ran as the party's presidential candidate in the December 1992 general elections, finishing sixth in a field of eight candidates with 0.3% of the vote. In the parliamentary elections, the party received 0.3% of the vote, winning one seat in the National Assembly out of a total 188; Anyona in Kitutu Masaba. Anyona was the KSC's presidential candidate again for the 1997 elections, finishing eighth out of the fifteen candidates with 0.3% of the vote, and retaining his one seat in the National Assembly out of 210. The party lost parliamentary representation following the 2002 elections, which saw the end of Moi's tenure.

Anyona was killed in a car accident in Nairobi in 2003. Upon Anyona's death, his work was praised by the left-wing Kenya Socialist Democratic Alliance for resisting the Moi government. Although the intertwining of the party with his personality had prevented any internal challenges, it hampered the party's ability to survive after his death. However, the party continued to operate despite poor electoral results.

The party nominated 16 candidates for the 2007 general elections, but received only 0.1% of the vote, remaining seatless. This was repeated in the 2013 elections, in which it nominated 12 National Assembly candidates. and was part of the CORD Coalition that supported Raila Odinga as the presidential candidate.
