= Nelson Gaichuhie =

Kenyan politician

Nelson Gaichuhie is a Kenyan politician. He belongs to the Party of National Unity and was elected to represent the Subukia Constituency in the National Assembly of Kenya since the 2007 Kenyan parliamentary election.
