= Nairobi Business Park =

Business park in Kenya

Nairobi Business Park is a flagship business park located in Nairobi, Kenya. It was the first business park in East Africa. The first phase, which includes 7,000 square metres of commercial office space, was completed in 2003.

== History ==
The Nairobi Business Park was first envisaged by the Jockey Club of Kenya. The club owned of 400 acres (1.6 km^{2}) of land by the Ngong Road between Nairobi and Karen. The club decided to diversify their land use by restructuring their land portfolio.

Some 30 acres (120,000 m^{2}) of land was sub-divided from the main block of land and transferred into the joint ownership of the Jockey Club of Kenya and CDC Capital Partners and the Nairobi Business Park Ltd was formed to develop the site, with the Jockey Club of Kenya retaining a shareholding in the development.

=== Development of the Business Park ===
Various studies were undertaken to define the type of development. An office park was decided upon, and designs made by Triad Architects, a Nairobi-based architectural firm. The overall scheme included 30,000 square metres of lettable office space, to be developed in phases to suit market conditions. The business park is managed by Knight Frank and CB Richard Ellis.

== Today ==
Phase 1 of the overall development was completed in March 2003 and consists of three office units. This phase includes 7,000 square metres of lettable space. Parking is provided on site to a ratio of one parking bay per 25 square metres of usable office space.

The offices are designed around a standard modular unit of a core and the two wings. The standard core element comprises WCs, a reception area and circulation. The two wings vary in size from a minimum of 400 square metres to a maximum of 600 square metres per floor.

Several companies have opened offices at Nairobi Business Park, including d.light, Siemens and Nokia.
