= Elections in Africa =

This page lists the most recent (direct) national elections in African countries.

== Algeria ==
- Presidential: 7 September 2024
- People's National Assembly: 12 June 2021

== Angola ==
- Presidential: 24 August 2022
- National Assembly: 24 August 2022

== Benin ==
- Presidential: 11 April 2021
- National Assembly: 11 January 2026

== Botswana ==
- Presidential: 30 October 2024
- National Assembly: 30 October 2024

== Burkina Faso ==
- Presidential: 22 November 2020
- National Assembly: 22 November 2020

== Burundi ==
- Presidential: 20 May 2020
- National Assembly: 20 May 2020
- Constitutional Referendum: 17 May 2018

== Cameroon ==
- Presidential: 12 October 2025
- National Assembly: 9 February 2020

== Cape Verde ==
- Presidential: 17 October 2021
- National Assembly: 18 April 2021

== Central African Republic ==
- Presidential: 28 December 2025
- National Assembly: 28 December 2025

== Chad ==
- Presidential: 6 May 2024
- National Assembly: 29 December 2024
- Constitutional Referendum: 17 December 2023

== Comoros ==
- Presidential: 14 January 2024
- Assembly of the Union: 12 January and 30 January 2025

== Côte d'Ivoire ==
- Presidential 25 October 2025
- National Assembly: 27 December 2025

== Democratic Republic of the Congo ==
- Presidential: 20 December 2023
- National Assembly: 20 December 2023

== Djibouti ==
- Presidential: 9 April 2021
- National Assembly: 24 February 2023

== Egypt ==
- Presidential: 10–12 December 2023
- People's Assembly: 10-11 November and 24-25 November 2025
- Constitutional Referendum: 20–22 April 2019

== Equatorial Guinea ==
- Presidential: 20 November 2022
- Senate: 20 November 2022
- Chamber of Deputies: 20 November 2022

== Eritrea ==
Eritrea, since independence, has repeatedly postponed elections.

== Ethiopia ==
- Presidential: 7 October 2024
- House of People's Representatives: 21 June and 30 September 2021

== Gabon ==
- Presidential: 12 April 2025
- National Assembly: 12 April 2025

== The Gambia ==
- Presidential: 4 December 2021
- National Assembly: 9 April 2022

== Ghana ==
- Presidential: 7 December 2024
- Parliament: 7 December 2024

== Guinea ==
- Presidential: 28 December 2025
- National Assembly 22 March 2020
- Constitutional Referendum 21 September 2025

== Guinea-Bissau ==
- Presidential: 23 November 2025
- National People's Assembly: 23 November 2025

== Kenya ==
- Presidential: 9 August 2022
- National Assembly: 9 August 2022
- Senate: 9 August 2022
- Constitutional Referendum: 4 August 2010

== Lesotho ==
- National Assembly: 7 October 2022

== Liberia ==
- Presidential: 10 October and 14 November 2023
- Senate: 10 October 2023
- House of Representatives: 10 October 2023

== Libya ==
Libya does not hold elections.

== Madagascar ==
- Presidential: 16 November 2023
- National Assembly: 29 May 2024
- Constitutional Referendum: 17 November 2010

== Malawi ==
- Presidential: 16 September 2025
- National Assembly: 16 September 2025

== Mali ==
- Presidential: 29 July and 12 August 2018
- National Assembly: 29 March and 19 April 2020

== Mauritania ==
- Presidential: 29 June 2024
- National Assembly: 13 and 27 May 2023

== Mauritius ==
- National Assembly: 10 November 2024

== Morocco ==
- Chamber of Representatives: 8 September 2021

== Mozambique ==
- Presidential: 9 October 2024
- Assembly of the Republic: 9 October 2024

== Namibia ==
- Presidential: 27 November 2019
- National Assembly: 27 November 2019

== Niger ==
- Presidential: 27 December 2020 and 21 February 2021
- National Assembly: 27 December 2020

== Nigeria ==
- Presidential: 25 February 2023
- Senate: 25 February 2023
- House of Representatives: 25 February 2023

== Republic of the Congo ==
- Presidential: 21 March 2021
- National Assembly: 10 and 31 July 2022

== Rwanda ==
- Presidential: 15 July 2024
- Chamber of Deputies: 15 July 2024

== São Tomé and Príncipe ==
- Presidential: 18 July and 5 September 2021
- National Assembly: 25 September 2022

== Senegal ==
- Presidential: 24 March 2024
- National Assembly: 17 November 2024

== Seychelles ==
- Presidential: 25–27 September and 9-11 October 2025
- National Assembly: 25–27 September and 9-11 October 2025

== Sierra Leone ==
- Presidential: 24 June 2023
- Parliament: 24 June 2023

== Somalia ==
- Senate: 29 July to 13 November 2021
- House of the People: 1 November 2021 to 31 March 2022

== South Africa ==
- National Assembly: 29 May 2024

== South Sudan ==
- Presidential: 11–15 April 2010

== Sudan ==
- Presidential: 13–16 April 2015
- National Assembly: 13–16 April 2015

== Swaziland ==
- House of Assembly: 29 September 2023

== Tanzania ==
- Presidential: 29 October 2025
- National Assembly: 29 October 2025

== Togo ==
- Presidential: 3 May 2025
- National Assembly: 29 April 2024

== Tunisia ==
- Presidential: 6 October 2024
- Assembly of the Representatives of the People: 17 December 2022 and 29 January 2023

== Uganda ==
- Presidential: 15 January 2026
- Parliament: 15 January 2026

== Western Sahara ==
- National Council: 8–9 April 2023

== Zambia ==
- Presidential: 12 August 2021
- National Assembly: 12 August 2021

== Zimbabwe ==
- Presidential: 23 August 2023
- Senate: 23 August 2023
- National Assembly: 23 August 2023

== Summary ==
Summary of East Africa Elections
| Country | Presidential Elections (1999–2026) | Recent Election Year | Next Election | Presidential Votes Cast in Last Election | Registered Voters |
|---|---|---|---|---|---|
| South Sudan | 2 | 2010 | 2026 | 2,813,830 | 4,800,000 |
| Uganda | 6 | 2026 | 2031 | 11,366,201 | 21,649,067 |
| Kenya | 6 | 2022 | 2027 | 14,326,641 | 22,120,458 |
| Tanzania | 6 | 2025 | 2030 | 32,678,844 | 37,647,235 |
| Rwanda | 4 | 2024 | 2029 | 8,907,876 | 9,071,157 |
| Burundi | 5 | 2025 | 2030 | 5,945,869 | 6,013,498 |

Political Events in African Countries by Region, 1999–2017
| Region | President/Prime Minsister | Parliamentary Elections | Peace Treaties | Total Countries |
|---|---|---|---|---|
| Southern Africa | 48 | 33 | 6 | 12 |
| Central Africa | 24 | 25 | 6 | 8 |
| East Africa | 42 | 35 | 5 | 13 |
| West Africa | 55 | 59 | 0 | 15 |
| North Africa | 18 | 18 | 2 | 6 |
| Total | 187 | 170 | 19 | 54 |

== See also ==
- Africa
- Elections
- Electoral calendar
- List of national legislatures
