= Linah Kilimo =

Kenyan politician

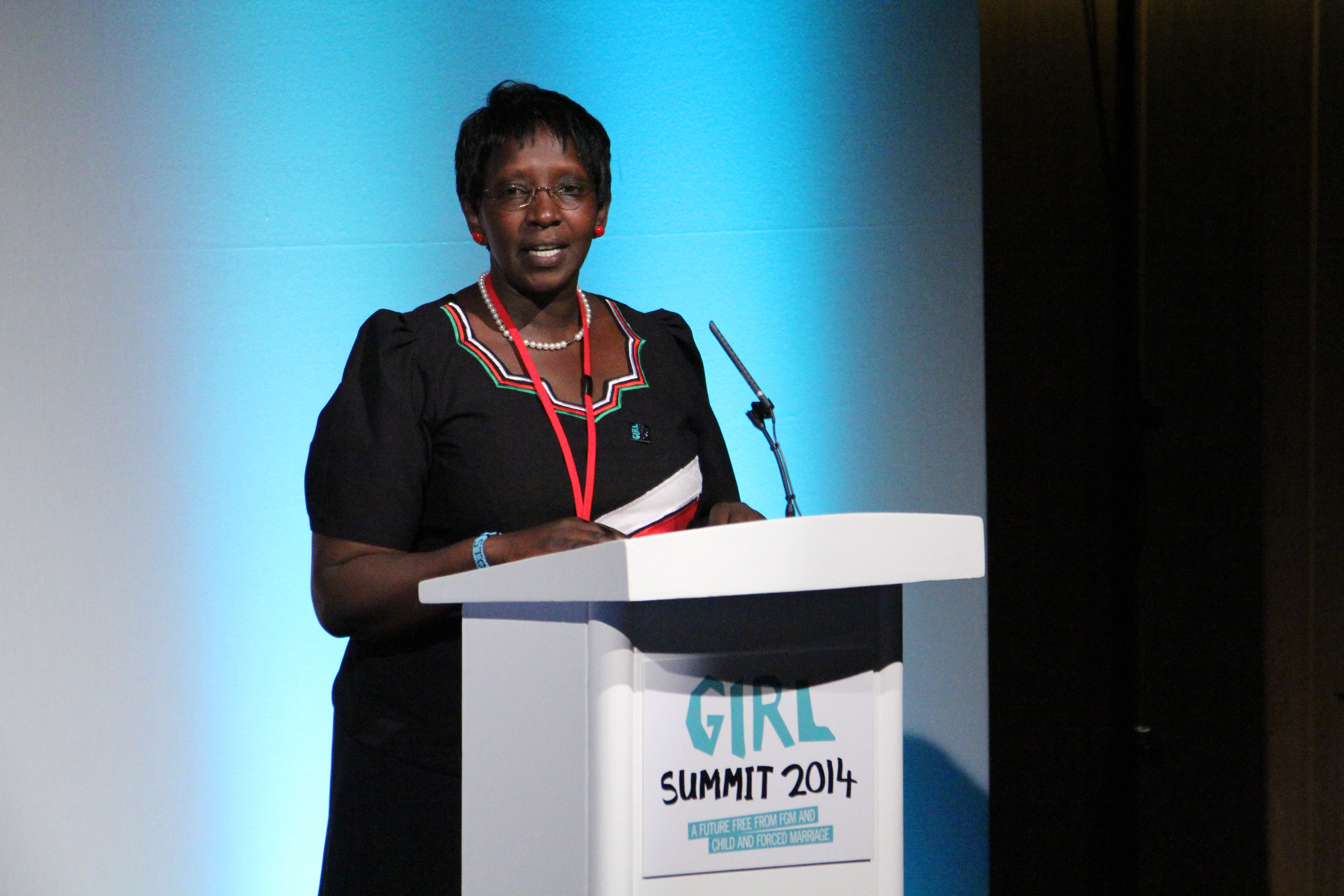
Linah Jebii Kilimo, Chair of anti-FGM Board, Kenya, speaking at the Girl Summit 2014

Linah Jebii Kilimo is a Kenyan politician who was an MP for Marakwet East constituency from 2002 to 2012. She first ventured into politics in 1997 by contesting the parliamentary seat on a KANU ticket, but lost to John Kiptoo Marrirmoi during the party primaries. She defected to Charity Ngilu's SDP but her campaign didn't gather sufficient momentum because of KANU's dominance in the region. However, she managed to unseat Marrirmoi in the 2002 general elections on a NARC ticket.

In 2005, she opposed the Constitutional Referendum, a de facto vote of no confidence in the Kibaki government. When the Government lost the referendum vote, she was removed from the Cabinet alongside high-profile politicians such as Raila Odinga and Kalonzo Musyoka.

The defeat of the Government marked the birth of Orange Democratic Movement (ODM), the largest political party (as at 2013 general elections). She was reluctant to join the newly formed party (ODM) possibly because of her experience in the way party nominations are conducted. Indeed, in 2007 she defended her seat on a KENDA ticket, thus avoiding any party nominations.

2007 General Election Results
Candidate	Party	Number of Votes
Linah Jebii Kilimo	KENDA	9,206
Sammy Kiprotich Tangus	ODM	7,418
Charles Kimutai Yano	ODM-K	6,344

2013 General Election Results
Candidate	Party	Number of Votes
David Kangogo Bowen	URP	11,599
Linah Jebii Kilimo	TNA	9,195
Sammy Kiprotich Tangus	KNC	3,272
Other candidates		850

== Major Achievements ==
1. Marakwet-Pokot Peace Deal. Kilimo was one of the regional leaders who brokered the Marakwet-Pokot peace deal, popularly known as the Kolowa Declaration. The Marakwet and Pokot ethnic groups were in a bitter war between 1991 and 2001 over cattle rustling. Thousands of people died as a result of fighting. The war was hardly reported in the mainstream media possibly because of government censorship. In 2002, Kilimo brokered a peace deal, which ended the fighting. Sporadic attacks still occur, but they are not as deadly as those of 1990's.
2. Tarmac Road. Kilimo used her influence in government to tarmac the Kapsowar-Chesoi-Tirap road. The road between Chesoi and Embobut was virtually impassable since independence. However, the election of Kilimo brought new changes to the region. It is now possible for public service vehicles to operate between Embobut and Kapsowar.
3. Electric Grid Expansion. During Kilimo's tenure, the national grid was extended from Kapsowar to Tirap. The Chesegon region was also connected to the Turkwel-Eldoret power grid.
4. Reduction in Female Genital Mutilation Cases. Kilimo has been instrumental in eradicating female genital mutilation. She brought the issue to the national limelight during her first term as an MP. Her stance on the issue backfired immediately in her village because the practice is still considered sacred. She had to backtrack in order to save her political career. In spite of this setback, she has managed to influence many families who would have otherwise allowed their daughters to be circumcised.
