= Kamwangi =

- Location within Kenya
- Coordinates: 0.95°S 36.9°E
- Country: Kenya
- County: Kiambu County
- Time zone: UTC+3 (EAT)
- Climate: Cfb

Kamwangi town is headquarter of Gatundu North Sub County Kiambu County, Kenya, in the former Central Province.

== Location ==
It is a town along Thika - flyover road. It's located west of Thika. There is however, a minor road connecting the town to Gatundu through Kang'oo.

== Economic activities ==
The main economic activities in the area are substance farming and trading. There is a very busy market, with the main market days being twice a week; on Tuesdays and Fridays. Buyers and sellers walk or travel long distance to Kamwangi on market days. Big shops in the town also attract many people from the nearby villages. There is also a digital technology hub named Brilliant Pixels Enterprises at Ufanisi House opposite Total Petrol Station. It also houses and operates a college named Achievers College.

== Administration ==
The town hosts the offices of DCC Gatundu North Sub County. The DCC offices are situated about 2 km away from the town towards Naivasha. Currently, the town is under Gatundu North constituency represented by Hon. Elijah Njoroge Kururi, who replaced Anne Wanjiku Kibe in the 2022 general elections.

== Transport and communication ==
The town lies along the Thika - Naivasha road, which connects it to other bigger towns. Bodabodas (motorbike) are common means of transport in the town and are used to transport people to the nearby villages. There is also a Post office named Kanjuku, though Kanjuku is another small town west of Kamwangi.

== People living in Kamwangi and its environs, ethnicity and religion ==
The people living in and near Kamwangi are mostly Kikuyu. A few members of other ethnic groups may also be found. The people are also Christians, both Catholics and Protestants. Some of the churches in the area include the Roman Catholic Church, Presbyterian Church of East Africa, Church of Restoration, Anglican Church of Kenya among others. Most of people living in this town rent houses and apartments in some of the flats in the town. Away from town there are several villages e.g. Gichagi, Kahuho, Kwabari (Mukuyuini), Kairi, Nguna, Makwa, Igegania, Israeli, Nyamathumbi.

== Health services ==
No public hospital in the town apart from some private clinics. Maryhelp Mission Hospital is one of the most popular health facilities in the area. People normally travel either to Gatundu Level 4 hospital or to Igegania Sub-district hospital or Gakoe Health Centres.

== Academic institutions ==
Public Schools include: Kamwangi Primary, Nyamathumbi Primary and Secondary Schools, Mukuyuini Primary. Others are in Kairi, Makwa, Karuri. Few private primary schools are found including Wise Shepherd, Good Luck academy, Morning Glory among others.

== Higher Education Institutions ==
Institutions found in this place are Pixels Institute of Technology, Future Stars College Of Professional Studies, Christian Theological College and Digital Point Technologies.there are several garages and workshops offering metal and panel beating services like Muteti's garage

== Infrastructure ==
Optic Fiber network is active and used mostly by the locals.
