= Clement Kungu Waibara =

Kenyan politician

Clement Kungu Waibara is a Kenyan politician. He belongs to the Party of Independent Candidates of Kenya and was elected to represent the Gatundu North Constituency in the 2007 National Assembly of Kenya. He lost to Kigo Njenga during the 2013 elections. He came second during the elections behind Gatundu North MP Wanjiku Kibe whose illegality case still stands, and Kigo Njenga who came third. Waibara has been steadfast in his election case which he began in 2018, where he is challenging the incumbent Wanjiku Kibe for vying for the MP seat under a Constitutional breach. He is currently running his chain of businesses in Thika and Nairobi Town.
