= Moses Kuria =

Kenyan politician

Moses Kiarie Kuria
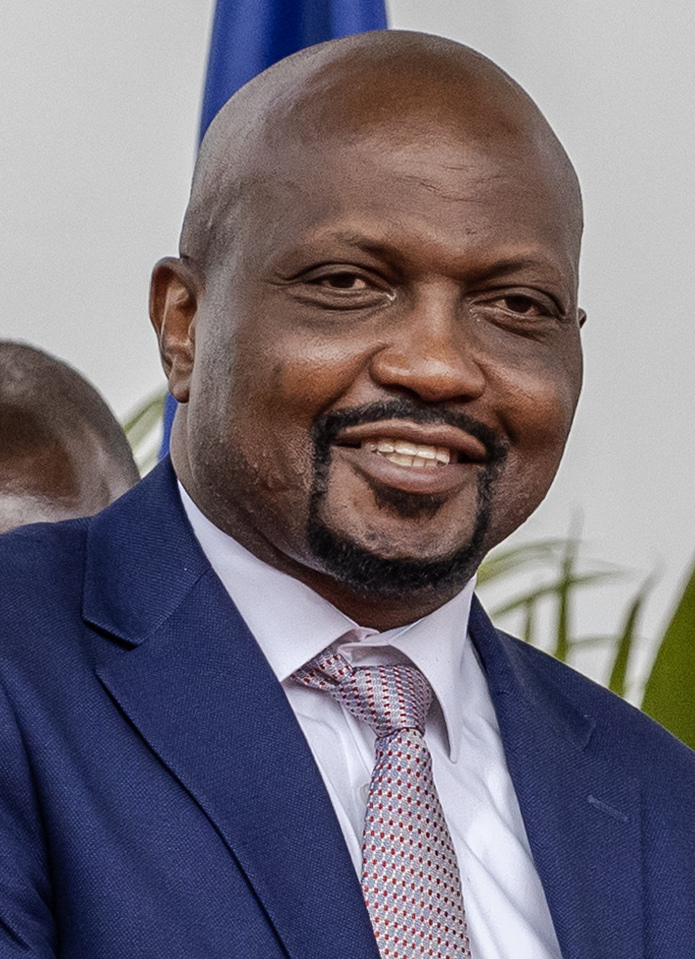
- Moses Kuria in 2023

Member of Parliament
- Incumbent
- Assumed office 2007
- Constituency: Gatundu South

Personal details
- Born: 1971 (age 54–55)
- Party: CCK; People's Empowerment Party (PEP); People's Progressive Party (PPP-K); ODM; TNA; Jubilee Party; UDA
- Education: University of Nairobi (undergraduate); Ituru Secondary Sch.; Githuya Primary Sch.
- Occupation: 2009 - Manager of Bs. Process, Al Rajhi Bank, Saudi Arab; 2007 - Chief Operating Officer, Wamad Info. Services, Dubai; 1995 - Head of Bs. Process, Afr., STANDARD CHARTERED BANK; 1994 - Auditor, Family Finance and Building Society

Moses Kiarie Kuria is a Kenyan politician and the former Cabinet Secretary (CS) for public service, performance and delivery management. He was appointed by President William Ruto and successfully vetted by the 13th Parliament of Kenya. He was sworn in on 27 October 2022 as the new CS for Investments, Trade and Industry, replacing Betty Maina.

== Political career ==
Kuria is an admirer of former President Kibaki. He attributes his admiration for politics to the former president. His political journey started when he joined Kibaki's team through Uhuru Kenyatta's Kanu Party.

Following the death of then-member of parliament (MP) for Gatundu South, Hon. Jossy Ngugi, Kuria was elected unopposed as the new MP in 2014 on The National Alliance (TNA) party. He was re-elected as an MP during the 2017 general elections to serve for a 5-year parliamentary term, running until 2022 on the Jubilee Party.

In 2021, he founded a new party, Chama Cha Kazi. He was succeeded by Gabriel Kagombe in the 2022 General Election.

During the 2022 general elections, he unsuccessfully vied for governor of Kiambu county. He lost the race to Kimani Wamatangi and conceded defeat, stating that he would proceed to pursue a different course in the private sector. On 27 September 2022, he was appointed as Cabinet Secretary for Investments, Trade and Industry.

In the October 2023 reshuffle, he was moved to the public service portfolio and was replaced as trade minister by Rebecca Miano.

== Controversy ==
=== Hate speech ===
Kuria's political career has been marred by controversy. He has been incarcerated several times and charged with hate speech. His ravaging attacks on Kenya's opposition have created a schism among political protagonists; while the opponents feel that Kuria is a "loose cannon" who is poised to incite his community against others, his proponents believe that he is an ardent defender of their interests in the political arena.

In 2015, Kuria threatened to sexually assault Millie Odhiambo on social media after Odhiambo criticized President Kenyatta. Kuria said he would force a broken glass bottle into Mabona's vagina.

=== Bribery ===
In 2021, Kuria admitted to taking a $1,000 dollar bribe to support the leadership bid of Amos Kimunya.

=== Edible oil scandal ===
In 2023, Kuria, who was then Trade and Investments Cabinet Secretary, was under fire after the auditor general reported that Kenya lost 6 billion shillings in the edible oil importation scandal. Kuria was questioned on how his ministry handled the importation and how private companies with affiliations to local politicians and government officials were involved in the deal. He defended himself against any wrongdoing, terming the importation a necessary measure in the government's mandate to tackle the rising cost of living.
