= Francis Ole Kaparo =

5th Speaker of the National Assembly of Kenya

Francis Xavier Ole Kaparo EGH

Chairman of the National Cohesion and Integration Commission
- In office August 2014 – October 2019
- Preceded by: Mzalendo Kibunjia
- Succeeded by: Samuel Kobia

Speaker of the National Assembly of Kenya
- In office 1993–2007
- Preceded by: Jonathan Ng’eno
- Succeeded by: Kenneth Marende

Member of Parliament for Laikipia East Constituency
- In office 1988–1992

Personal details
- Born: 1 September 1950 (age 76) Colony and Protectorate of Kenya
- Party: United Republican Party (URP)
- Other political affiliations: Kenya African National Union (KANU)
- Education: University of Nairobi
- Occupation: Politician, Lawyer
- Profession: Lawyer
- Known for: Second longest-serving Speaker of the National Assembly of Kenya
- Awards: Elder of the Golden Heart (EGH)

Francis Xavier Ole Kaparo (born 1 September 1950), EGH, is a Kenyan politician. He was the Commission Chairman, the NCIC since August 2014 to October 2019.

== Political life ==
He has served the Government and the people of Kenya in different capacities and was the second longest serving Speaker of the National Assembly of Kenya, having served from 1993 to 2007. He was the Member of Parliament for Laikipia East from 1988 to 1992. Hon. Kaparo has served as an Assistant Minister in a number of government ministries. These include the Ministry for National Guidance and Political Affairs (1988–1989); the Ministry for Supplies and Marketing (1989–1990) and the Ministry for Labour (1990–1991) and the Minister for Industry Between 1991 and 1993.

== Career ==
He is a lawyer by profession with vast experience in Kenya's political and development discourse. He holds a Bachelor of Laws (LLB) degree from the University of Nairobi and a post graduate Diploma in Laws from Kenya School of Law. He was admitted to the roll of Advocates as an Advocate of the High Court of Kenya in 1977.

Before joining the Commission, Kaparo was appointed by the President of Kenya as the chief mediator for the Marsabit and Mandera Counties Peace Processes, together with Senator Mohamed Yusuf Haji. Francis Ole Kaparo had also been the Chairman of the United Republican Party (URP).

Kaparo is the current Chief Scout of The Kenya Scouts Association.

Kaparo has been the Chairman of several Conservancies in Kenya. These include Lewa Wildlife Conservancy, Northern Rangelands Trust, Ilngwesi Bandas, Lekurruki Conservancy and Kijabe Conservancy. He has also been a Board Member of Laikipia Wildlife Forum and Ol Pejeta Conservancy.
