= Juja =

Town in Kiambu, Kenya

Juja is a town in Kiambu County in Kenya. It is home to Jomo Kenyatta University of Agriculture and Technology (JKUAT).

There are several industries in Juja, including Pulp and Paper, which recycles brown paper. Star Plastics is another manufacturer which makes water drums and other plastic products. Safari Stationers manufactures stationery products, and Hydro Aluminum produces aluminum profiles.

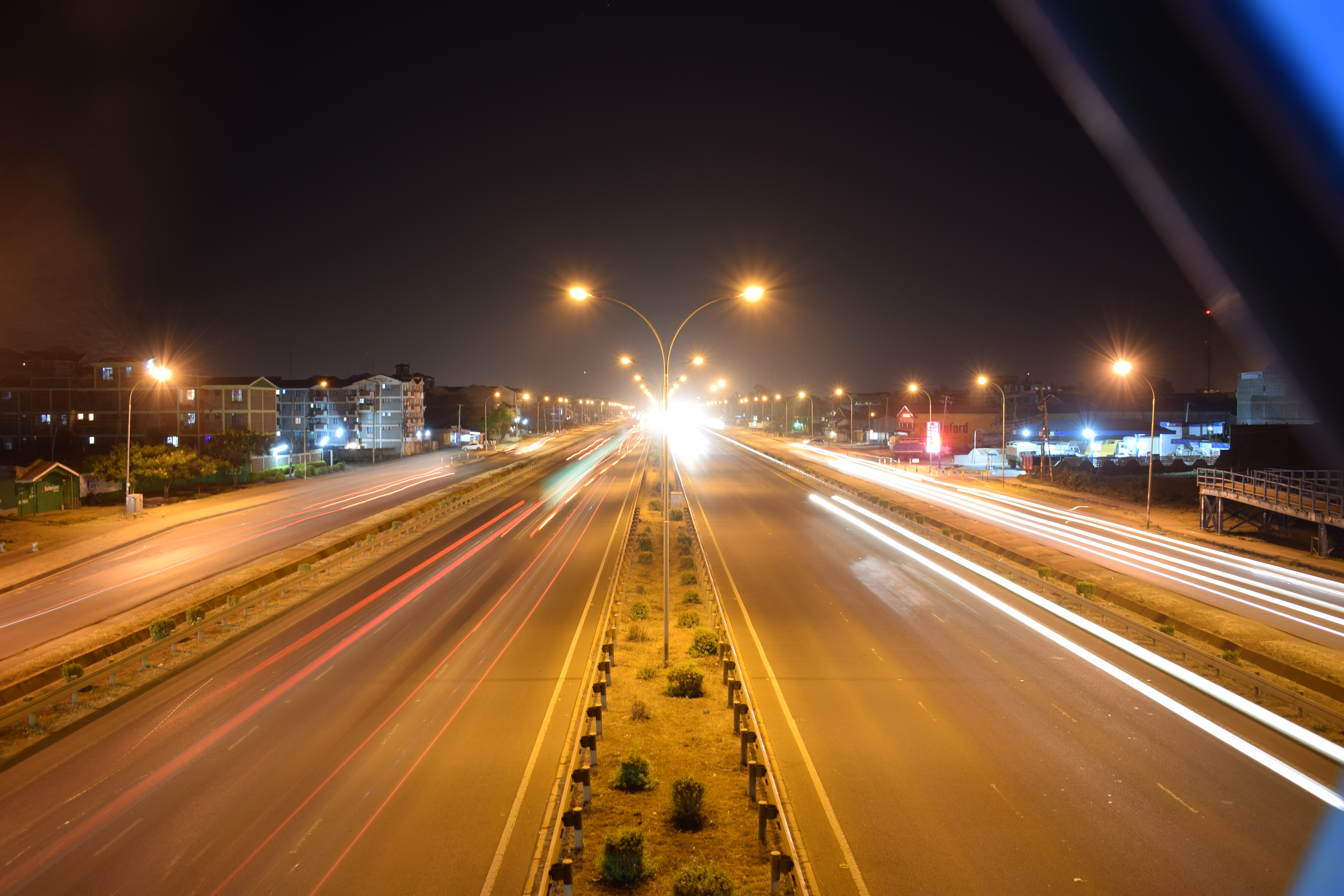
Thika-Nairobi highway in Juja

Juja is also home to the Juja City Mall, Juja Preparatory School, Kalimoni Primary School, Mang'u High School and parts of the Thika Superhighway.

The town is located about 30 kilometers north of Nairobi between Thika and Ruiru towns. The Nairobi Business Park is found in the environs of this town. Juja is under the Nairobi Metropolitan Authority as envisaged in the development program Kenya Vision 2030.

According to the 2019 census, Juja has a population of 156,041.

== History of Juja Town ==
Private records from McMillan Memorial Library indicate that sometime in 1900 when Lord William Northrop Macmillan arrived in Nairobi, he was carrying two statues which he had bought in West Africa. He had been told that one was Ju and the other was Ja, and had been asked to preserve them, otherwise he would perish at sea.

McMillan then settled on the road to Thika where he bought some 19,000 acres, at a time when nobody was allowed to own more than 5,000 acres. Privately, he attributed it to the powers of Ju and Ja idols and as a result, he named the large expanse Ju-Ja Farm.

Because of the numerous superstitions that surrounded Juja Farm, it became a no-go zone and locals used to fear entry into a land they always heard had been jinxed. As a result, McMillan's wife took the two idols from the house and buried them in Ndarugu Valley, near Thika Town. As a result, the name Juja started entering into annals of colonial history in Kenya and refused to give way to its former name, ‘Weru wa Ndarugu’, the Ndarugu plains. (Courtesy: The Business Daily Newspaper) Currently, Juja Constituency has five wards namely, Juja, Murera, Theta, Kalimoni and Witithie. Juja Ward has the highest population out of the five wards. Juja Ward has a lot of centers, namely 1)Muchatha 2)Kanini Farm 3) Shalom 4)HardRock 5)Boma estate 6)Kay's 7) Murehma 8) Croton E 9) Riverside Kibii 10) Kipipiri 11) Mathare 12) Eastleigh 13) Mlandizi 14) Josephine's 15) Riverside Juja 16) Carnation 17) Orion 18) Greenfield 19) Joyland 20) United 21) Makena 22) Bomblast 23) Danemas 24) White house 25) Oasis 26)Kifariti 27) St Mary's 28) Woodland 29) Waroma 30)Mirimaini 31) Number4 32) George's 33) Munghetto 34) Ol Kaluo 35) Molo 36) Kisumu Ndogo 37) Westview 38) Kanawa 39) Chemi Chemi 40)Mashanani 41) Baba Martins 42) Gachororo Farmers 43) Kiaora 44) Nesco 45) Azania 46) St Paul's 47) Dam View 48)Titanic 49) Tumaini 50) Berea 51) Soko Gachororo 52) Gachororo 53)White line 54) Highpoint 55)County offices 56)Sunrise 57) Kareme 58) Cheers 59)Seagull 60) Marbles 61) Philo1 62)Mwangaza 63)

== Education ==
Public Primary Schools population

- Thiririka Primary School
- Gachororo Primary School
- Kalimoni Primary School
- Mirimani Primary School
- Juja Farm Primary School
- Karamaini Primary School
- Nyachaba Primary School
- Athi Primary School
- Jkuat Primary School
- Kiaora Primary School
- Kibii Primary School
- St Paul Primary School
- Kigwe Primary School
- St. Francis Primary School
- Mwireri Primary School
- Karakuta Primary School
- Kuraiha Primary School
- Ndururumo Primary School
- Thome Primary School
- Kumura Primary School
- Theta Primary School
- Rurii Primary School
- Munyaka Primary School

Public High Schools

- Mangu High School
- Gachororo Secondary School
- Kalimoni Senior School

Technical Colleges

- Kilimambogo Technical Training College

Public Universities

- Jomo Kenyatta University of Agriculture and Technology

== More Functions of Juja Town ==
Juja also serves as the Main Headquarters to a couple of organisations such as Straight Security, a private security company that provides guarded security all over Kenya, Senate Hotel, a 3 star hotel, Glowbal Digital; A digital marketing company owned by The Medici Group, The Ksh. 1.7 Billion Juja City Mall and Ruiru Juja Water and Sewerage Company (RUJWASCO), a service company that provides piped water and sewerage services to Ruiru, Juja and its environs within Kiambu County. Juja is also home to tech startup Onetap Technologies mostly known for their School Software, SchoolCloud recently rebranded to SchoolCloudAfrica.
