= Paul Muite =

Kenyan politician (born 1945)

Paul Mūite

Member of the Kenyan Parliament
- In office 1992–2007
- Constituency: Kabete Constituency

Personal details
- Born: 18 April 1945 (age 81) Kenya
- Party: Safina
- Other political affiliations: FORD; FORD-Kenya
- Education: University of London (LL.B); Kenya School of Law (Dip)
- Profession: Lawyer

Paul Kībūgi Mūite (born 18 April 1945) is a Kenyan lawyer and politician

== Political career ==
Mūite is a prominent figure in Kenya's second liberation struggle during the 1990s to remove the single party dictatorship established by the Kenya African National Union in 1982. He served as vice chairman of the Forum for the Restoration of Democracy – Kenya while it was under the tutelage of Oginga Odinga and is the founding chairman of the Safina party of Kenya. Mūite previously served as a law clerk in the years preceding Kenya's attainment of independence. He has served several terms in the National Assembly of Kenya as the member of parliament of Kabete Constituency.
