= Gatundu South Constituency =

Constituency in Kiambu County, Kenya

Gatundu South
- constituency for the Parliament of Kenya
- Gatundu South Constituency within Kiambu County

- Kiambu County within Kenya
- County: Kiambu
- Population: 122,103
- Area: 194 km^{2} (74.9 sq mi)

Current constituency
- Number of members: 1
- Party: UDA
- Member of Parliament: Gabriel Gathuka Kagombe
- Wards: 4

Gatundu South is an electoral constituency in Kiambu County, Kenya and the seat of the subcounty Officer is in Gatundu Town. It is one of twelve constituencies in Kiambu County which comprises four wards: Kiamwangi, Kiganjo, Ndarugo, and Ng'enda. All of them are within the Kiambu County Council. The constituency was established before the 1997 General Elections. Previously it was part of the larger Gatundu Constituency which was split into Gatundu South Constituency and Gatundu North Constituency. It is ranked 182 out of 210 Constituencies in Kenya in size and 165 out of 210 in population size.

The current Member of Parliament is Gabriel Kagombe who succeeded Moses Kuria in 2022.

== Theta Dam ==
Theta Dam is in Gatundu South. It's located inside Kinale Forest, its being constructed across Theta River in Gatundu South constituency. The project includes construction of a 17-meter-high compacted earth fill dam, Construction of a reinforced concrete spillway and Laying of a 3.5 km long 500mm diameter steel pipeline up to the Mundoro forest edge.

On completion, Theta dam reservoir will have a storage capacity of 2 million cubic meters (2 Billion liters). This will enable production of 15,000 m3/day of water that will augment both the Ndarugu and Thiririka water projects reliability. This will improve water supply to the upper parts of Gatundu such as Gachika, Kiamuoria, Kiganjo, Gatitu of greater Kiganjo location and upper parts of greater Ndarugu locations.

== Members of Parliament ==
Elections	MP	Party	Notes
1997	Moses Mwihia	SDP	Gatundu Constituency split into Gatundu North Constituency and Gatundu South Constituency.
2002	Uhuru Kenyatta	KANU	
2007	Uhuru Kenyatta	KANU	Uhuru Kenyatta also appointed to serve as the Deputy Prime Minister on the grand coalition government.
2013	Jossy Ngugi Nyumu	TNA	Uhuru Kenyatta also elected President of the Republic of Kenya on March 4, 2013, on a TNA Ticket. Josepgh Ngugi Nyumu died on 21 May 2014
2014 Kenyan by-election	Moses Kuria	TNA	
2017	Moses Kuria	JP	
2022	Gabriel (GG) Kagombe	UDA	

== Population Data ==
Area

177 km^{2} (68 sq mi) (Ranked 182 of 210 Constituencies)

Population

107,049 (Ranked 165 of 210 Constituencies)

Population Density

593.5/km^{2} (1,537/sq mi) (Ranked 40 of 210 Constituencies)

Male

51,656

Female

55,393

Gender Index (women to men)

1.08 (Ranked 53 of 210 Constituencies)

Households

28,037

Average Household size

3.82 (Ranked 167 of 210 Constituencies)

Registered Voters

54,740

Proportion of Population Registered to Vote

0.48 (Ranked 19 of 210 Constituencies)

Proportion of Youth Voters

0.42 (Ranked 162 of 210 Constituencies)

== Locations and wards ==
Location	Population
Kiamwangi	23,630
Kiganjo	28,502
Ndaragu	21,554
Ng'enda	46,562
Total	120,248
1999 census.

Ward	Registered Voters
Kiamwangi	11,333
Kiganjo	12,698
Ndaragu	9,459
Ng'enda	23,154
Total	56,644
*September 2005.
