= George Anyona =

Kenyan politician

George Moseti Anyona

Member of Parliament for Kitutu East / Kitutu Masaba

Personal details
- Born: 1945 Tombe Village, Kitutu Masaba, Kenya
- Died: 2003 (aged 57–58)
- Education: Alliance High School, Makerere University
- Occupation: Politician
- Known for: Advocacy for democracy, free expression, and anti-corruption

George Moseti Anyona (1945–2003) was a politician from Kenya.

Despite being born to peasant parents, Anyona rose to prominence in the Kenyan political landscape to be thrice elected to the Kenyan Parliament representing the people of Kitutu East (later renamed Kitutu Masaba) constituency. He shared an ideological viewpoint and was a close political confidant of the first vice-president of Kenya, Jaramogi Oginga Odinga. Anyona's name remains dominant among Kenya's political personalities because he is perceived by a large section of Kenyans as a brave man, who was strong enough to challenge the Kenya African National Union (KANU) government at a time when it was almost suicidal to do so. He forged a reputation as a principled politician who championed free expression of thought, democracy and a just and equal society. He lived a modest life, never seeking to enrich himself from the offices he held and abhorred the culture of corruption and worship of money that prevailed in the country.

== Early life ==
Anyona was born in 1945 in Tombe Village, Kitutu Masaba, Kenya.

He attended Tombe Primary School from 1952 to 1954 and Sengera Intermediate School from 1955 to 1958 before proceeding to the prestigious Alliance High School where he schooled from 1959 to 1964 and served as Deputy School Captain. From Alliance, he proceeded to Makerere University, Uganda where he studied Political Science, English, Economics and History between 1965 and 1968, graduating with Bachelor of Arts (Hons) and serving as President of the Kenya Makerere Students Union in 1967. Upon returning from Uganda, Anyona worked as an Assistant Secretary in the Office of the President between 1968 and 1970, as the Secretary General of the Kenya Red Cross Society in 1970 and as Nairobi Airport Manager then District Sales Manager for British Overseas Airways Corporation (BOAC) later renamed British Airways in Nairobi from 1970 to 1974.

== Rise to politics ==
In 1974, he contested and won the then Kitutu East Parliamentary seat. He quickly established a reputation as a fearless firebrand and for thorough research before presenting issues in parliament, coming to be referred to as a 'one-man backbench' after parliament was neutered following the murder of JM Kariuki and the detention of then Deputy Speaker and Tinderet MP Jean Marie Seroney and Butere MP Martin Shikuku . Anyona's political troubles began in 1977 when he was arrested within the precincts of parliament (an illegality in itself) for questioning the award of a tender for the supply of wagons to the then East African Railways and Harbours Corporation and detained without trial at Manyani Prison by then President Jomo Kenyatta. He was released a year later by President Daniel arap Moi soon after he assumed power following the death of President Kenyatta. His attempts to resume representative politics were thwarted when he was barred from contesting his old parliamentary seat in the 1979 General Elections and from contesting trade union elections as a candidate for the post of Secretary General of the Transport and Allied Workers Union in 1980.

Anyona would again be arrested in 1981 and charged with sedition but the charges were eventually withdrawn by the state. In 1982, this time with his longtime friend and veteran politician Jaramogi Oginga Odinga and several others , he attempted to form a political party Kenya African Socialist Alliance (KASA) to challenge the ruling party KANU. He was arrested on the way to the Intercontinental Hotel Nairobi to hold a press conference to announce the formation of the party and was detained without trial on 2 June 1982 and incarcerated at Kamiti and Shimo La Tewa Prisons; Jaramogi was later placed under house arrest in August 1982. Anyona was also expelled from the ruling party KANU. Shortly after Anyona was detained, his lawyer John Khaminwa was also detained without trial and a crackdown followed that targeted university lecturers, student leaders, politicians, lawyers and journalists. KANU, sensing the danger the two politicians had posed, immediately sought to change the constitution. The result was the passing of a constitutional amendment making Kenya a de facto one-party state the same year.

Anyona was released from detention in 1984 but his attempts to resume active politics were thwarted by the state when he was barred from contesting KANU branch elections in 1985, trade union elections in 1986, the Kitutu East (Masaba) parliamentary seat in the 1988 General Elections and Speaker of the National Assembly in 1988. He teamed up with his friend Jaramogi in 1990 during the clamour for multi-party democracy in Kenya; to many Kenyans, this was one battle Anyona and Jaramogi could not shy away from because they were the ones who started it in 1982. Anyona was however arrested at a Nairobi pub and charged with sedition. Others arrested with him included Professor Edward Oyugi, Isiah Ngotho Kariuki, and Augustus Njeru Kathangu. The experiences they went through included torture at the infamous Nyayo House torture chambers in Nairobi. After a marathon trial, they were jailed for fifteen years running concurrently for seven years on charges of scheming to overthrow the Kenyan government and being in possession of seditious and proscribed publications. According to some documents presented in the trial, it was alleged that Anyona had gone as far as preparing a shadow cabinet to take over after he overthrew the government. However, it was later revealed by an Assistant Minister in the Office of the President, John Keen, that these allegations were nothing but government fabrications, aimed at silencing Anyona. In 1992, after filing appeals against their sentences, the four were released on bail. On 20 May 1992, they were freed when the state opted not to oppose their appeals.

== Multiparty era ==
With the multi-party elections coming up in December 1992, all opposition parties hoped Anyona would give them his endorsement. FORD-Kenya in particular, then under Jaramogi Oginga Odinga was seen as Anyona's perfect destination. He was elected the FORD-Kenya Nyamira District Branch Chairman in absentia. In a surprising move however, Anyona rejected FORD-Kenya's overtures, opting instead to launch his own political party Kenya Social Congress. In the 1992 Multi-Party General Elections, he easily won the Kitutu Masaba Constituency parliamentary seat, becoming the only member of parliament from the KSC. He also stood as a presidential candidate in the same elections and came out 5th. He served as the Chairman of the Public Investments Committee (PIC) of the national assembly for 1993/1994 and was re-elected as a member of parliament in 1997 for another 5-year term.

Anyona died on 4 November 2003 in a car crash on Lusaka Road in Nairobi.

== Family ==
Anyona was married to Esther Mokeira and they had five children: Diana Bosibori Anyona, Kwameh Nyabwera Anyona, Evelyn Nyanduko Anyona, Timothy Ombega Anyona (Mwalimu) and Winnie (Mandela) Kemunto Anyona, Clive Ombane Gisairo.
