= Safina (political party) =

Political party in Kenya

- Leader: Jimmy Wanjigi
- Founder: Richard Leakey; Paul Muite
- Founded: 13 May 1995
- Registered: 26 November 1997
- Headquarters: Nairobi
- Ideology: Social liberalism Social democracy Civic nationalism
- Political position: Centre to centre-left
- Slogan: "All Kenyans deserve a chance."

Safina (lit. 'Ark' in Swahili) is a political party in Kenya, founded by palaeoanthropologist and conservationist Richard Leakey together with lawyer Paul Muite.

== History ==
In May 1995, Richard Leakey joined some Kenyan intellectuals in launching a new political party. The Safina party was routinely harassed and even its application to become an official political party was not approved until 1997. That year, international donor institutions froze their aid to Kenya because of widespread corruption. To placate the donors, Daniel arap Moi appointed Leakey as Cabinet Secretary and head of the civil service in 1999. Leakey's second stint in the civil service lasted two years. He lost the cabinet post in 2001.

== Politics ==
In the legislative elections on 27 December 2007, the party won five out of 210 elected seats.

The party leader is Paul Muite, a former Member of Parliament for Kabete Constituency and a senior counsel at the Kenyan Bar. He and his running mate, Shem Ochuodho, were contestants for the Presidency of Kenya in the 2013 Kenyan general election.

Safina's highest political organ is the National Executive Council, which meets twice a year. The NEC is elected for four-year terms by a National Delegates Convention. The current NEC was elected on 15 July 2011.
