= 1992 Kenyan general election =

- 29 December 1992
- Presidential election
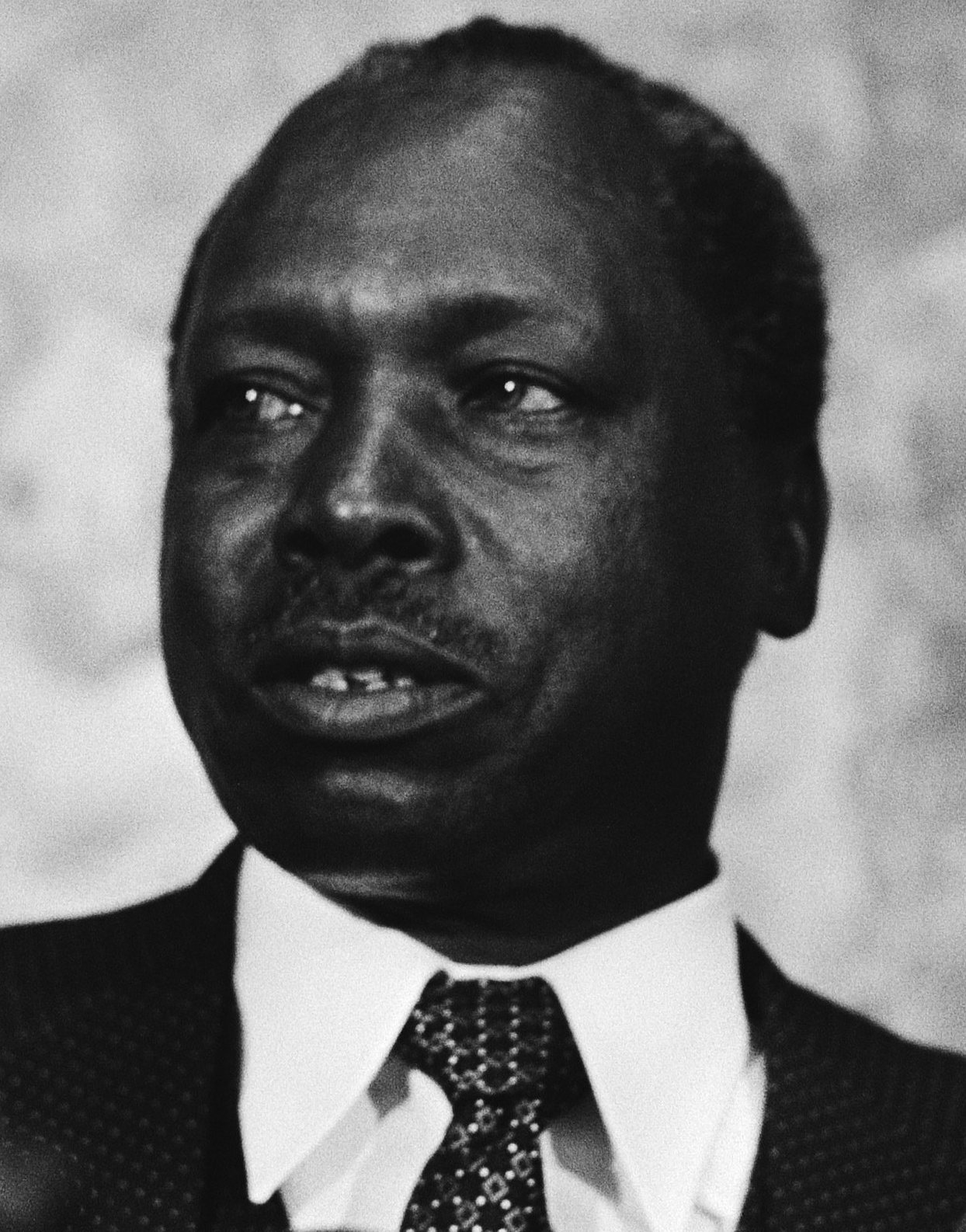

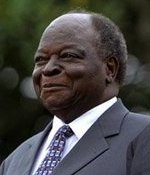

Nominee	Daniel arap Moi	Kenneth Matiba
Party	KANU	FORD–Asili
Popular vote	1,962,866	1,404,266
Percentage	36.35%	26.00%
Nominee	Mwai Kibaki	Jaramogi Oginga Odinga
Party	Democratic	FORD-K
Popular vote	1,050,617	944,197
Percentage	19.45%	17.48%
- Results by province
President before election
Daniel arap Moi
Kenya African National Union
Elected President
Daniel arap Moi
KANU
- Parliamentary election
Party	Leader	Seats
KANU	Daniel Arap Moi	100
FORD–Asili	Kenneth Matiba	31
Democratic	Mwai Kibaki	23
FORD–Kenya	Jaramogi Oginga Odinga	31
KNC	Chibule wa Tsuma	1
PICK	John Harun Mwau	1
KSC	George Anyona	1
This lists parties that won seats. See the complete results below.
Speaker of the National Assembly before	Speaker of the National Assembly after
Jonathan Kimetet arap Ng'eno; KANU	Francis ole Kaparo; KANU

General elections were held in Kenya on 29 December 1992 to elect the president and members of the National Assembly. They were the first multi-party general elections in Kenya since independence and the first to feature a direct vote for the president, who had been elected by the National Assembly in 1964 and been automatically declared the winner of uncontested elections held alongside parliamentary elections in 1969, 1974, 1979, 1983, and 1988 following a 1969 constitutional amendment.

In preparation for the election, the ruling KANU party manipulated constituent boundaries to enable it to retain a parliamentary majority.

The results were marred by irregularities, including allegations of large-scale intimidation of opponents, harassment of election officials, and ballot-box stuffing, as well as targeted ethnic violence in the Rift Valley Province. Human Rights Watch accused several prominent Kenyan politicians, including President Daniel arap Moi and then-VP George Saitoti, of inciting and co-ordinating the violence. Voter turnout was 69%.

The election failed to dislodge Moi from power but was still described as a watershed for Kenya's democratic transition.

== Background ==
In 1991, Kenya transitioned to a multiparty political system after 26 years of single-party rule under KANU. On 28 October 1992, President Moi dissolved parliament, five months before the end of his term. As a result, preparations began for all elective seats in parliament as well as the president. The elections were scheduled to take place on 7 December 1992, but delays led to their postponement to 29 December the same year.

== Results ==
=== President ===
Candidate	Party	Votes	%
Daniel arap Moi	Kenya African National Union	1,962,866	36.35
Kenneth Matiba	FORD–Asili	1,404,266	26.00
Mwai Kibaki	Democratic Party	1,050,617	19.45
Jaramogi Oginga Odinga	FORD–Kenya	944,197	17.48
George Anyona	Kenya Social Congress	14,273	0.26
Chibule wa Tsuma	Kenya National Congress	10,221	0.19
John Harun Mwau	Party of Independent Candidates of Kenya	8,118	0.15
David Mukaru Ng'ang'a	Kenya National Democratic Alliance	5,766	0.11
Total		5,400,324	100.00
Source: African Elections Database

=== By province ===
Province	Moi		Matiba		Kibaki		Odinga		Others		Total
Province	Votes	%	Votes	%	Votes	%	Votes	%	Votes	%	Total
Central	21,918	2.1	630,194	60.4	373,147	35.8	10,668	1.0	6,945	0.7	1,042,872
Coast	188,296	62.1	33,399	11.0	32,201	10.6	42,796	14.1	6,653	2.2	303,345
Eastern	290,372	37.0	79,436	10.1	392,481	50.0	13,673	1.7	8,819	1.1	784,781
North Eastern	46,420	74.8	7,188	11.6	3,259	5.3	5,084	8.2	73	0.1	62,024
Nairobi	62,410	16.6	165,553	44.1	69,715	18.6	75,888	20.2	1,944	0.5	375,510
Nyanza	117,554	15.2	10,299	1.3	51,998	6.7	581,490	75.4	9,807	1.3	771,148
Rift Valley	981,488	71.5	214,727	15.6	98,302	7.2	75,465	5.5	3,535	0.3	1,373,517
Western	219,187	39.3	214,060	38.4	14,404	2.6	98,822	17.7	10,846	1.9	557,319
Total	1,927,645	36.6	1,354,856	25.7	1,035,507	19.6	903,886	17.1	48,622	0.9	5,270,516
Source: Nohlen et al.

=== National Assembly ===
Following the elections, Moi nominated a further 12 KANU members to the National Assembly.

Party	Seats
Kenya African National Union	100
FORD–Asili	31
Democratic Party	23
FORD–Kenya	31
Kenya National Congress	1
Party of Independent Candidates of Kenya	1
Kenya Social Congress	1
Kenya National Democratic Alliance	0
Social Democratic Party	0
Appointed members	12
Total	200
Source: Nohlen et al.

== Aftermath ==
In the aftermath of the election, Kenya suffered an economic crisis propagated by ethnic violence as the president was accused of rigging electoral results to retain power. Over the next five years, numerous political alliances emerged to prepare for the upcoming elections. In 1994, Jaramogi Oginga Odinga died, and several coalitions joined his FORD Kenya party to form a new party called the United National Democratic Alliance. Disagreements plagued this party. In 1996, KANU revised the constitution to allow Moi to remain president for another term.

In 1993, Kenneth Matiba filed a petition against the election results. However, his failure to personally sign the petition resulted in the petition being struck out by Justice Riaga Omolo. Matiba was physically incapacitated and had given his wife power of attorney. In 2012, Justice Omolo was declared unfit to serve in the judiciary by the Judges and Magistrates Vetting Board over this decision.
