= 1997 Kenyan general election =

- 29 December 1997
- Presidential election
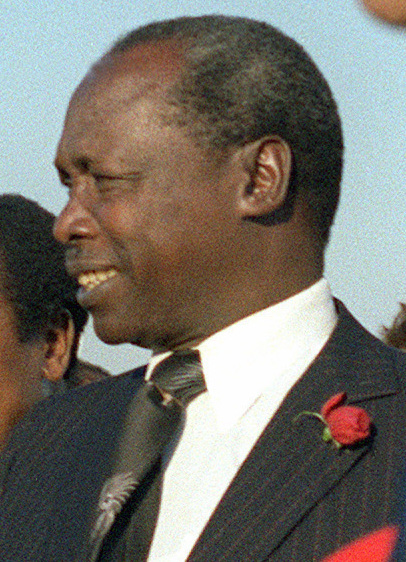

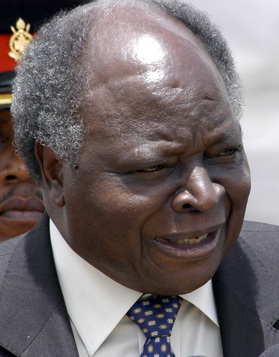

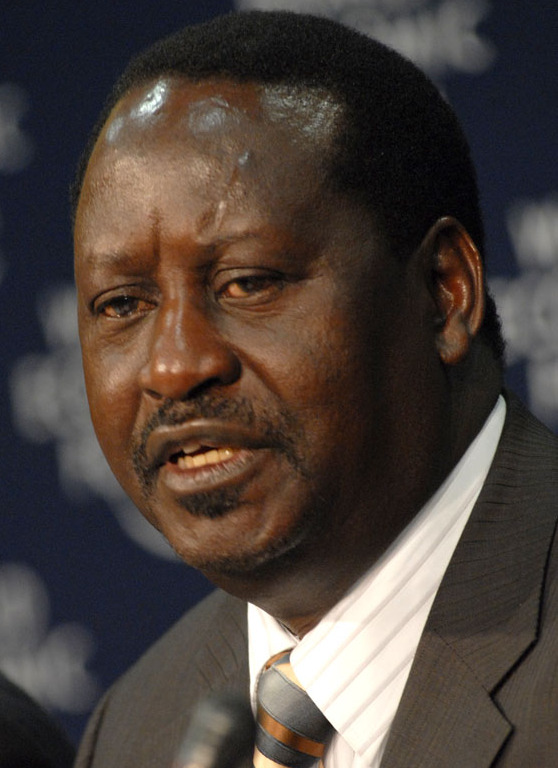

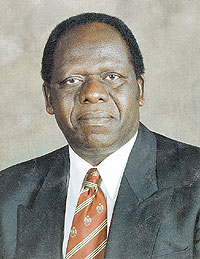

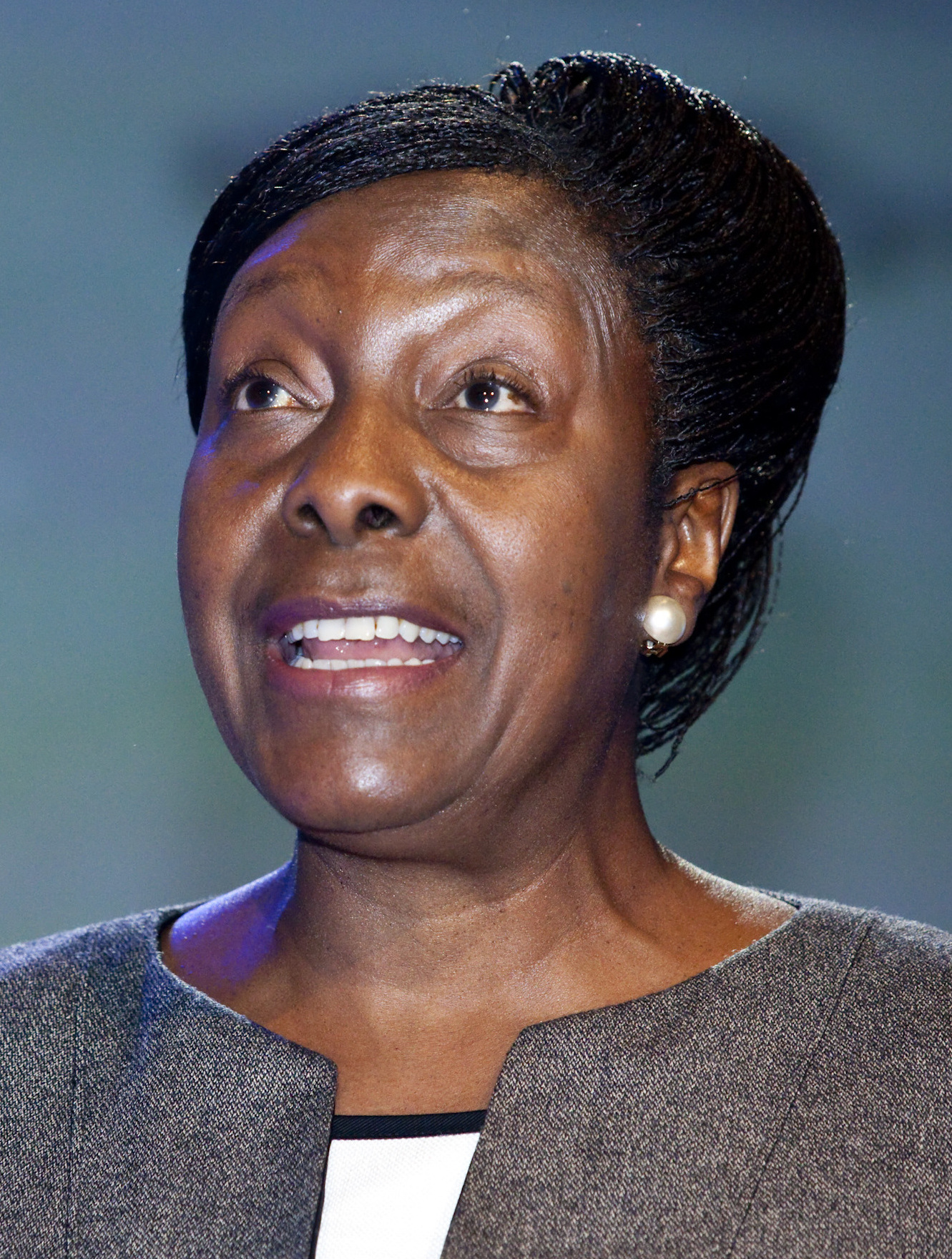
Nominee	Daniel arap Moi	Mwai Kibaki	Raila Odinga
Party	KANU	Democratic	NDP
Popular vote	2,500,865	1,911,742	667,886
Percentage	40.40%	30.89%	10.79%
Nominee	Michael Kijana Wamalwa	Charity Ngilu
Party	FORD-K	SDP
Popular vote	505,704	488,600
Percentage	8.17%	7.89%
- Results by province
President before election
Daniel arap Moi
Kenya African National Union
Elected President
Daniel arap Moi
KANU
- Parliamentary election
Party	Leader	Seats	+/–
KANU	Daniel Arap Moi	107	+7
Democratic	Mwai Kibaki	39	+16
NDP	Raila Odinga	21	+21
FORD–Kenya	Michael Kijana Wamalwa	17	−14
SDP	Charity Ngilu	15	+15
Safina	Paul Muite	5	New
FORD–People	Kimani wa Nyoike	3	New
FORD–Asili	Martin Shikuku	1	−30
KSC	George Anyona	1	0
Shirikisho		1	New
This lists parties that won seats. See the complete results below.
Speaker of the National Assembly before	Speaker of the National Assembly after
Francis ole Kaparo; KANU	Francis ole Kaparo; KANU

General elections were held in Kenya on 29 December 1997 to elect the president and the members of the National Assembly. The result was a victory for the ruling Kenya African National Union, which won 107 of the 210 seats in the National Assembly, and whose candidate Daniel arap Moi won the presidential election. Following the election, Moi appointed a further 12 members to the Assembly.

== Results ==
=== President ===
Candidate	Party	Votes	%
Daniel arap Moi	Kenya African National Union	2,500,865	40.40
Mwai Kibaki	Democratic Party	1,911,742	30.89
Raila Odinga	National Development Party	667,886	10.79
Michael Kijana Wamalwa	FORD–Kenya	505,704	8.17
Charity Ngilu	Social Democratic Party	488,600	7.89
Martin Shikuku	FORD–Asili	36,512	0.59
Katama Mkangi	Kenya National Congress	23,554	0.38
George Anyona	Kenya Social Congress	16,428	0.27
Kimani wa Nyoike	FORD–People	8,306	0.13
Koigi wa Wamwere	Kenya National Democratic Alliance	7,745	0.13
Munyua Waiyaki	United Patriotic Party	6,194	0.10
Godfrey M' Mwereria	Green African Party	4,627	0.07
Wangari Maathai	Labour Party	4,246	0.07
Stephen Oludhe	Independent Economic Party	3,691	0.06
David Waweru Ng'ethe	Umma Patriotic Party	3,584	0.06
Total		6,189,684	100.00
Registered voters/turnout		9,063,390	–
Source: Nohlen et al.

==== By province ====
Province	Moi		Kibaki		Odinga		Wamalwa		Ngilu	
Province	Votes	%	Votes	%	Votes	%	Votes	%	Votes	%
Central	56,367	5.6	891,484	89.4	6,869	0.7	3,058	0.3	30,535	3.1
Eastern	370,954	35.6	296,335	28.5	7,787	0.7	7,017	0.7	349,754	33.6
Coast	257,065	63.4	51,909	12.8	24,844	6.1	11,306	2.8	38,089	9.4
Nairobi	75,272	20.6	160,124	43.9	59,415	16.3	24,971	6.8	39,707	10.9
North Eastern	70,506	73.2	20,404	21.2	311	0.3	4,431	4.6	440	0.5
Nyanza	215,923	23.6	138,202	15.1	519,180	56.8	14,623	1.6	15,301	1.7
Rift Valley	1,140,109	69.5	343,529	21.0	36,022	2.2	102,178	6.2	11,345	0.7
Western	314,669	44.9	9,755	1.4	13,458	1.9	338,120	48.2	3,429	0.5
Total	2,500,865	40.4	1,911,742	30.9	667,886	10.8	505,704	8.2	488,600	7.9
Source: Nohlen et al.

=== National Assembly ===
Party	Votes	%	Seats	+/–
Kenya African National Union			107	+7
Democratic Party			39	+16
National Development Party			21	New
FORD–Kenya			17	–14
Social Democratic Party			15	+15
Safina			5	New
FORD–People			3	New
FORD–Asili			1	–30
Kenya Social Congress			1	0
Shirikisho Party of Kenya			1	New
Appointed members			12	0
Total			222	+22
Valid votes	5,813,599	98.39		
Invalid/blank votes	95,349	1.61		
Total votes	5,908,948	100.00		
Registered voters/turnout	9,063,390	65.20		
Source: IPU

Of the 12 appointed members, six were representatives of KANU, two from the Democratic Party, and one each from the National Development Party, FORD–Kenya, the Social Democratic Party, and Safina.

== Aftermath ==
In 1998 Mwai Kibaki took a petition against Moi to court, having served Moi by publishing the notice of the petition in the Kenya Gazette. However, judges Emmanuel O'Kubasu, Mbogholi Msagha and Moijo ole Keiwua ruled that Kibaki should have served Moi with the petition personally. Their position was upheld at the Court of Appeal by judges Omolo, Bernard Chunga (Chief Justice), AB Shah, AA Lakha and Owuor JJ.
