= Kiambu District =

Former district of Kenya

Coordinates: 1°10′S 36°50′E

Kiambu District was an administrative district in the Central Province of Kenya. Its capital town was Kiambu. The district was adjacent to the northern border of Nairobi and had a population of 744,010.

Created during the colonial era, it underwent changes, absorbing part of Thika District, losing some of its regions to Nairobi such as parts of Dagoretti while gaining some including Ruiru. In 1966, Thika District was abolished and absorbed by its neighbouring districts, and Kiambu District was identical to the present-day Kiambu County. In 1994, Thika District was re-established from eastern regions of Kiambu and southern areas of Murang'a. In 2009, Thika District was declared unlawfully created and was reabsorbed to Kiambu yet again. In 2013, Kiambu County was effected on the same boundaries as the district absorbing it in the process.

The district was predominantly rural, but its urban population is increasing as Nairobi is growing rapidly. The Kikuyu are the dominant tribe in the district.

In 2007, Kiambu District was subdivided in two: Kiambu East and Kiambu West. Kiambu West district took Limuru, Lari and Kikuyu divisions, with Limuru as its district capital.

== Local authorities ==
Authority	Type	Population*	Urban pop.*
Kiambu	Municipality	72,139	13,814
Limuru	Municipality	70,765	4,141
Karuri	Town	100,506	19,746
Kikuyu	Town	165,594	4,104
Kiambu county	County	335,006	5,319
* 1999 census. Source:

== Administrative divisions ==
Division	Population*	Urban pop.*	Headquarters
Githunguri	136,554	8,831	Githunguri
Kiambaa	188,055	22,861	Kiambu
Kikuyu	194,521	3,724	Kikuyu
Lari	111,302	0	
Limuru	113,578	3,708	Limuru
* 1999 census. Sources: ,
