= List of British concentration camps during the Mau Mau Uprising =

The British government used concentration camps during the 1952–1960 Mau Mau Uprising in British Kenya. Thomas Askwith, the official tasked with designing the British 'detention and rehabilitation' programme during the summer and autumn of 1953, termed his system the Pipeline. The British did not initially conceive of rehabilitating Mau Mau suspects through brute force and other ill-treatment—Askwith's final plan, submitted to Baring in October 1953, was intended as "a complete blueprint for winning the war against Mau Mau using socioeconomic and civic reform." What developed, however, has been described as a British gulag.

Two types of work camps were set up. The first type were based in Kikuyu districts with the stated purpose of achieving the Swynnerton Plan; the second were punitive camps, designed for the 30,000 Mau Mau suspects who were deemed unfit to return to the reserves. These forced-labour camps provided a much needed source of labour to continue the colony's infrastructure development.

Colonial officers also saw the second sort of works camps as a way of ensuring that any confession was legitimate and as a final opportunity to extract intelligence. Probably the worst works camp to have been sent to was the one run out of Embakasi Prison, for Embakasi was responsible for the Embakasi Airport, the construction of which was demanded to be finished before the Emergency came to an end. The airport was a massive project with an unquenchable thirst for labour, and the time pressures ensured the detainees' forced labour was especially hard.

The following list includes detention camps of various types, organized by district or province.

The Museum of British Colonialism is also documenting the camps for exhibitions and awareness.

== Fort Hall District ==
- Fort Hall Reception Centre
- Kamaguta
- Kandara
- Kangema
- Kigumo
- Mariira

== Kirinyaga District ==
- Dondueni
- Gathigiriri
- Kandongu
- Karaba
- Mwea
- Thiba

== Meru District ==
- Mbeû
- Miathene
- Machakû

== Nyeri District ==
- Aguthi
- Karatina
- Mukuruweini
- Mweru
- Othaya
- Nyeri Show Ground

== Kiambu District ==
- Gatundu
- Githiga
- Kiambu Transit Camp
- Ngenya
- Waithaka

== Rift Valley Province ==
- Marigat

== Coast Province ==
- Hola
- Mkobe
- Takwa

== Southern Province ==
- Athi River
- Kathonzweni
- Mara River
- Ngulot

== Miscellaneous ==
- Lodwar
- Kamiti
- Mageta Island
- Manyani
- Nairobi Dispersal Centre
- Saiyusi Island
- South Yatta
- Fort Hall Prison
- Embu Prison
- Meru Detention Camp
- Kisumu Prison
- Marsabit Prison
- Nairobi New Prison
- Kamiti 'Y' Camp
- Hindi
- Mombasa Prison
- Wamumu

== See also ==
- Mau Mau Uprising
