= Kenol–Isiolo Highway =

Road in Kenya

Coordinates: 00°39′52″S 37°12′29″E

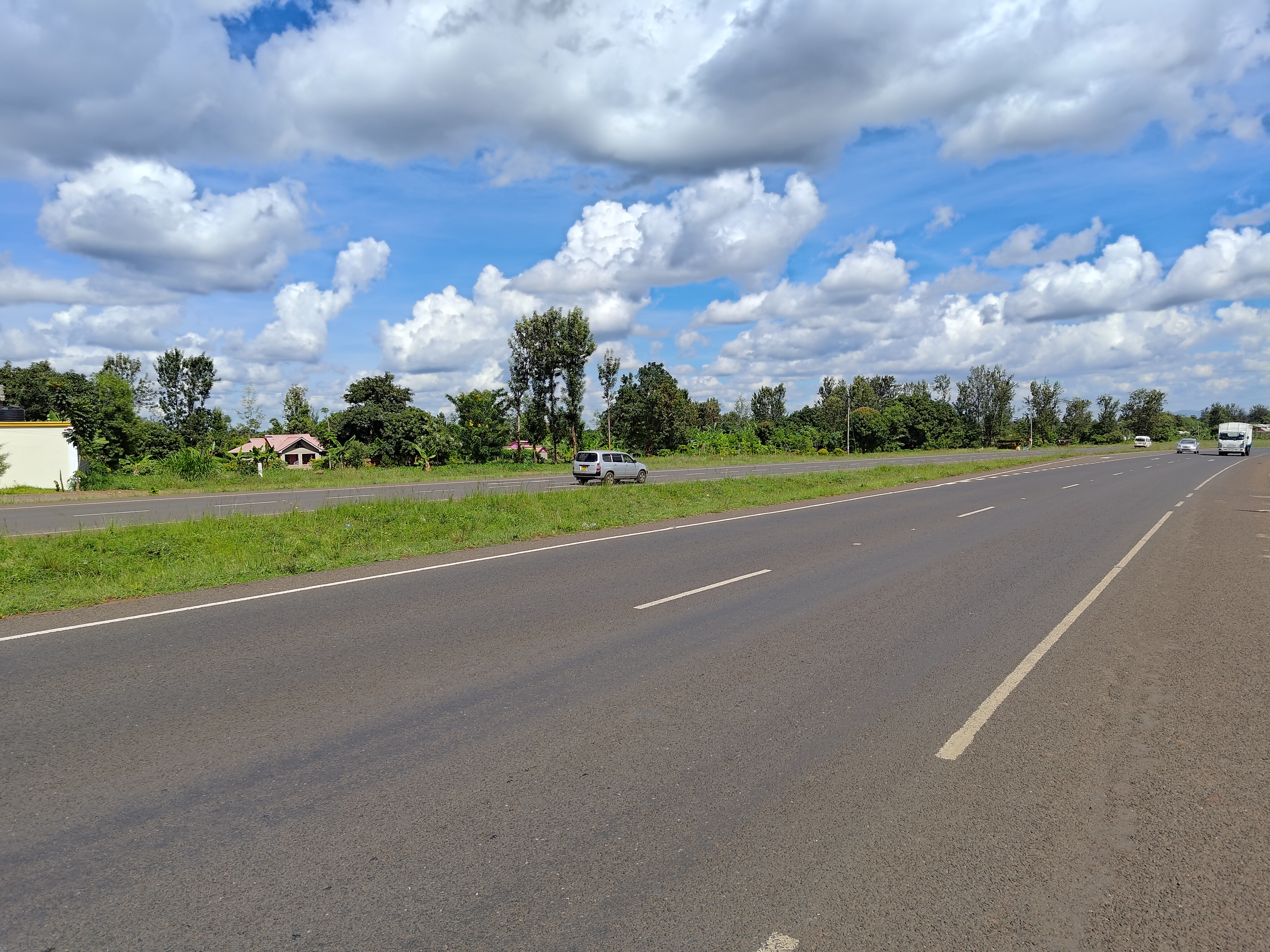

Route information
- Length: 189.5 mi (305.0 km)
- History: Designated in 2019; Completed in 2023 (Expected)

Major junctions
- South end: Kenol
- Ruiru; Thika; Makuyu; Sagana; Kiganjo; Nanyuki; Subuiga
- North end: Isiolo

Location
- Country: Kenya

Highway system
- Transport in Kenya

The Kenol–Isiolo Highway, is a planned dual carriage highway in Kenya. The highway would link Kenol, in Machakos County, to the towns of Ruiru and Thika, in Kiambu County, Kabati and Makuyu in Muranga County, Sagana and Kibirigwi in Kirinyaga County, Karatina and Kiganjo in Nyeri County, Nanyuki in Laikipia County, Timau in Meru County and Isiolo, in Isiolo County.

== Location ==
The highway starts at Kenol, a neighborhood in the town of Mitaboni, in Machakos County, approximately 25 kilometres (16 mi), north of Machakos, where the county headquarters are located.

It takes a general northerly direction through nine Kenyan counties, skirting Mount Kenya to end at Isiolo, approximately 305 kilometres (190 mi), to the north. The coordinates of the highway, in the town of Sagana, in Kirinyaga County are: 0°39'52.0"S, 37°12'29.0"E (Latitude:-0.664444; Longitude:37.208056).

== Overview ==
This highway is part of an important road corridor that links the counties in the Mount Kenya region that it passes through, to markets in northern Kenya and neighboring Ethiopia. It is part of the Northern Corridor road network.

The highway is divided into two sections, namely (a) Kenol–Nyeri (b) Nyeri–Isiolo. The road is designated as a Class A road, and is under the jurisdiction of Kenya National Highway Authority.

== Upgrading and widening ==
The highway, for the most part, follows the route of the existing single carriageway road, that is in various stages of disrepair. The Government of Kenya, through its parastatal Kenya National Highways Authority, plans to widen the road to a dual carriageway. As of January 2019, the design for the Kenol–Nyeri section was complete. At that time, it was expected that by June 2019, the design of the Nyeri–Isolo section would also be complete. Then the project is expected to move from the design stage to the procurement stage.

== See also ==
- List of roads in Kenya
- East African Community
