= Maragua Constituency =

Kenyan electoral constituency

Maragua Constituency is an electoral constituency in Kenya. It is one of seven constituencies in Muranga County. It was one of three constituencies in the former Maragua District, Central Province. The constituency was established for the 1997 elections.

== Members of Parliament ==
| Elections | MP | Party | Notes |
|---|---|---|---|
| 1997 | Peter Kamande Mwangi | Democratic Party | |
| 2002 | Elias Mbau | NARC | |
| 2007 | Elias Mbau | PNU | |
| 2013 | Peter Kamande Mwangi | The National Alliance (TNA) | |
| 2017 | Mary Waithera Wamaua | Jubilee party (JP) | |
| 2022 | Mary Waithera Wamaua | United Democratic Alliance (UDA) | |

== Wards ==
| Ward | Registered Voters | Local authority |
|---|---|---|
| Gakoigo | 4,479 | Maragua town |
| Ichagaki | 4,480 | Maragua town |
| Mbugua | 2,106 | Maragua town |
| Samar | 1,626 | Maragua town |
| Kambiti maragua ridge | 4,632 | Makuyu town |
| Kirimiri | 4,167 | Makuyu town |
| Makuyu | 9,497 | Makuyu town |
| Wempa | 3,408 | Makuyu town |
| Kamahuha / Maranjau | 10,113 | Maragua county |
| Nginda | 7,871 | Maragua county |
| Total | 54,895 | |
*September 2005,
