= Maragua District =

Former district in Kenya

Coordinates: 0°48′S 37°08′E

Maragua District was a former district of Kenya, located in the defunct Central Province. Its capital was the town of Maragua. In 1999, Maragua District had a population of 387,969 and an area of 868 km^{2} (335 sq mi). Maragua district was created in September 1996, when it was split from Muranga District.

In 2010, Maragua District was merged into Muranga County.

== District subdivisions ==
Local authorities (councils)
Authority	Type	Population*	Urban pop.*
Maragua	Town	39,697	30,433
Kandara	Town	28,840	840
Makuyu	Town	53,223	176
Maragua County	County	278,522	4,932
Total	-	387,969	10,234
* 1999 census. Source:

Administrative divisions
Division	Population*	Urban pop.*	Headquarters
Kandara	157,454	1,883	Kandara
Kigumo	78,678	1,568	Kigumo
Makuyu	58,273	1,597	Makuyu
Maragua	93,564	3,300	Maragua
Total	387,969	8,348	-
* 1999 census. Sources: , ,

== Electoral constituencies ==
The district had three constituencies:

- Maragua Constituency
- Kandara Constituency
- Kigumo Constituency
