= Kigumo Constituency =

Electoral constituency in Kenya

Kigumo
- constituency for the Parliament of Kenya
- Kigumo Constituency within Murang'a County

- Murang'a County within Kenya
- County: Murang'a
- Population: 136,921
- Area: 244 km^{2} (94.2 sq mi)

Current constituency
- Number of members: 1
- Party: UDA
- Member of Parliament: Joseph Kamau Munyoro
- Wards: 5

Kigumo Constituency is an electoral constituency in Kenya. It is one of the seven districts of Muranga County. It was previously one of three constituencies in the former Maragua District, Central Province. The constituency was established for the 1963 elections.

== Members of Parliament ==
Elections	MP	Party	Notes
1963	Kariuki Karanja Njiiri	KANU	One-party system
1963	Jomo Kenyatta	KANU	One-party system
1969	Munene J. F. C.	KANU	One-party system
1974	Njuguna Mwangi	KANU	One-party system
1979	Njuguna Mwangi	KANU	One-party system
1983	Francis Mwangi Thuo	KANU	One-party system.
1988	Francis Mwangi Thuo	KANU	One-party system.
1992	John B. Kirore Mwaura	Ford-Asili	
1997	Onesmus Kihara Mwangi	Democratic Party	
2002	Onesmus Kihara Mwangi	NARC	
2007	Jamleck Irungu Kamau	Party Of National Unity(PNU)	
2013	Jamleck Irungu Kamau	The National Alliance (TNA)	
2017	Ruth Wangari Mwaniki	Jubilee Party	
2022	Joseph Kamau Munyoro	United Democratic Alliance (UDA)	

== Wards ==
The constituency has four wards, all electing members for the Murang'a County Assembly.

Ward	Registered Voters
Kangari	22,170
Kigumo	15,392
Kinyona	18,701
Muthithi	17,961
Kahumbu	11,652
Total	85,876
*September 2005,
