= International Centre of Technology =

College in Thika, Kenya

Coordinates: 1.062755°S 37.157831°E

- ICT Thika
- Motto: Centre of Excellence Knowledge and Success
- Type: Private,
- Established: 2007
- Location: Thika, Kenya
- Website: www.ict.ac.ke

International Centre of Technology (ICT) is a college located in the outskirts of Thika in the Central Province of Kenya. The college was established in January 2007 and was registered by Kenyan Ministry of Higher Education, Science and Technology in 2011. Registration No. MOHEST/PC/1405/011

The college is accessible from Thika, Nairobi, and Matuu, about 8 km from Thika along Thika/Garissa highway in an area commonly known as Landless. It offers academic courses in Fire Fighter I, Fire Fighter II, EMT1, Paramedic, Cosmetology, Information Technology, Business, Community Development, Vocational Training, and Disaster Management.

ICT Schools and Departments

- School of Emergency Medical Services
- Fire Fighting Academy
- School of Information Technology
- School of Hospitality Management
- School of Science(Occupational Health and Safety)
- School of Disaster Management
- School of Cosmetology
- School of sports science
- School of Vocational Training

Courses

- Diploma/Certificate in Sales Management and Marketing
- Emergency Medical Technician
- Fireman 1 NFPA Qualification
- Certificate in Information Technology (ICT)
- Certificate/Diploma in Automotive Engineering (ICT)
- Certificate in Electrical Engineering (ICT)
- Diploma in Community Development and Social Work
- Bridging courses
- Fire and First Aid Training
- Disaster Management
- Cosmetology
- Fire Marshall
- Emergency Medical Dispatcher
- Hazmart
- Fire Fighter 1
- Fire Fighter 2
- ICT Fire & Rescue College Website

The college offers sponsorship program through Out of Afrika, a UK-registered charity and international non-governmental organization in Kenya to cater for bright students from disadvantaged backgrounds who would not normally have the chance to continue with further education due to financial restraints on the family.
