= Karugutu =

Kaugutu may refer to:

- Karugutu, Kenya, a settlement in Nyandarua County, Kenya
- Karugutu, Uganda, a settlement in Ntoroko District, Western Region of Uganda.
