= Ihwagi =

- Location within Kenya
- Coordinates: 0.45°S 37.15°E
- Country: Kenya
- Province: Central Province
- Time zone: UTC+3 (EAT)

Ihwagi is a settlement in Kenya's Central Province. Currently, it is a shopping center as well as one of the sub locations in Kairia Location of Kirimara Division, Mathira East District, Mathira Constituency, Nyeri County. It is on the Karatina town- Karatina University (Kagochi Road), approximately 5 kilometers from Karatina Town (CBD) and roughly 130 kilometers from Nairobi city.

Ihwagi is known to have one of the nicest weather in Karatina compared to other regions. This may be due to the fact that it is located on the slopes of Mt. Kenya. The area is encompassed with a great vegetation causing it to be one of the most friendly places in the region. Despite being a smaller region than most, Ihwagi's access to the Ragati river also makes it one of the best places to farm. As a result, most of the local citizens are subsistence farmers and small business owners. Due to the subtropical climate, the area is known to have plenty of rain which often causes the Ragati river to flood. However, the most damage caused by the river is the destruction of crops. This being said, farmers and Ihwagi's locals have developed various ways to deal with the floods.

Mt. Kenya snow-capped peak, the second-highest point in Africa can be seen from here. Aberdare ranges can also be seen on the horizons, western side of Ihwagi.

Current Iria-ini MCA David Mwangi Kabatha Muthiri hails from the area.

== Neighbourhoods ==
It covers such areas as the trading center, Gitige, Kiambaa, Gathima, Kamugoiri, Kiawaiguru, Kihururu, Kirima among others. Its neighboring areas are: Miiri, Gatura, Kiamwangi, Ihwagi, Kiragati, Itundu, Thenge-ini, Kariki, Kangocho, Kiaritha-ini, Kiaruhiu, Giakaibei, Ndumanu, Giti-maini, Gikumbo, Gathehu, Gaikuyu, Kanjurri, Karura, Ragati, Kiamucheru

== Maumau ==
The area has a long history being the center of Mau Mau activities during the freedom struggles: Some of the Mau Mau freedom fighters and operatives from this area include: Njogu Guandaru, Rukanga Kanyoro, Ngatia Kanake, Thimbui Guandaru, Munyua Mathenge, Kanja Mathenge, Githinji Muhato, Munyaga Meru, Mumbi Thoithi, Betha Gichanga, Wanjiru Kanake, Gathigia Muchiri, Njoka Kanake, Wangu Ngatia, Kihara Mathenge, Gachie Kiragu, Mwarari Kimaru among many others°. A trench, locally known as Mukaro wa Gumba, believed to have been dug by Gumba and Athi people can be found in the area at James Muchunu's farm.Among other notable personalities from this area include Joseph Gikonyo Mukinyi, the former 100 and 200 meters record holder

== Shopping center ==
The shopping center has a number of businesses including: several food stores, general shops, hardware stores, agrovets, Mobile Money transfer agencies, barber shops popularly known as Kinyozi, chemists, kerosene and petrol pump stations, L.P. gas refill points, pubs including the famous Hague Bar and Restaurant, CCF among others, there are several Medical clinics and a county managed dispensary located at Ihwagi ACK Church. There is an open-air market which mostly operates in the evenings.

== Other activities ==
There are several churches such as: Ihwagi Catholic Church, Ihwagi PCEA, PEFA, Full Gospel Church, Independent Church, Antioch Baptist among others. It is home to Ihwagi primary school which is currently undergoing a facelift courtesy of Okoa Ihwagi Primary school, a group of former students and friends of the school. Ihwagi Secondary is hosted by Ihwagi Primary. Other schools in the area include: Highway academy and Waithanji's. The area is agriculturally rich, famous for horticulture (cabbage, French beans, tomatoes among others) cash crop farming – tea and coffee, dairy farming, small scale fish farming, poultry keeping and bee keeping. Superior water, a popular mineral water brand is sourced from Kihururu springs, located one and half kilometers from the trading center.

== Features ==
Ragati River, a tributary of Tana River passes near the area; it is the main source of water for Ihwagi and surrounding areas. Kamugoiri stream located eastern side of Ihwagi trading center also provides the people of Ihwagi with water. The road infrastructure in the area is average with the main road being the bitumen level Karatina- Kagochi, others include Ihwagi –Karura, Ihwagi -Gatondo and paths serving the neighborhoods.

== Beauty and culture ==
The area is evergreen, with coffee and tea farms, though shrinking, spread all over especially at Kirima, Kihururu, Kamugoiri and Gathima; cabbage, tomatoes, French beans, maize, beans and some other crops in the farms allover also add to the beauty. The area has many trees too, both exotic and indigenous. There are several Mugumo trees (rare features in the country) in the area, one of them is found at Gitige farm.

== News ==
https://www.nation.co.ke/counties/nyeri/Hague-Pub-Nyeri-Ihwagi/1954190-2480244-o7cwss/index.html

https://www.standardmedia.co.ke/article/1144014629/police-declares-war-on-mungiki-and-vigilantes

http://www.mediamaxnetwork.co.ke/393224/aciari-thukuru-wa-muthingi-wa-ihwagi-kaunti-ini-ya-nyeri-kurungana-makienda-murutani-munene-ahamurithio/

https://www.karu.ac.ke/index.php/news-events/archived-news/86-girls-mentorship-in-mathira-east-sub-county
