= Joytown Primary School =

Special school in Kenya

Joytown Primary School is a school for physically disabled children. The school is situated in Thika Municipality in Thika District in the Central Province of Kenya. It is about 45 kilometers from Nairobi, the capital of the Republic of Kenya. The school was founded in 1962 by a Salvation Army missionary officer, Colonel Cyril Woods, as the church's expression of loving care to children who are disabled. The objective was to give rehabilitation to physically disabled people to enable them to walk and gain skills that would make them self-reliant.

The main service offered at the school is that of correcting limb deformities through a process that involves surgery and physiotherapy. Although the children will not attain total cure, they are enabled to use their limbs and are able to walk on their own. Alongside this, the children receive primary level education with boarding and lodging.

The school is managed by a School Board of Governors, whose thirteen members are appointed by the Kenyan Ministry of Education in liaison with the school's sponsor, The Salvation Army.

Primary level education is offered up to Std.8 including a nursery class and special unit for children with mental and physical disabilities. There were a total of 290 children enrolled in the school in 2007 ( 180 boys and 110 girls) in 10 classes. Among them 18 were in kindergarten and 25 children were in the special unit for the severely physically disabled.

== Physical Handicap Categories ==
There are various categories of physical handicap among the children:

- Poliomyelitis
- Spina Bifida
- Muscula Dystrophy
- Cerebral Palsy
- Brittle Bone
- Bow Legged & Club Foot
- Congenital handicap

== Permaculture activities ==
Local NGOs (RODIKenya.org and SCOPE Kenya) specialized in introducing permaculture in schools have been active in Joytown school, providing additional food to the children.

On March 2, 2018, a group of participants from TOP Kenya led by TOP expert Yaniv Fieldust came to build a green-wall and children participated to the set up by putting the small plants into the bottles.

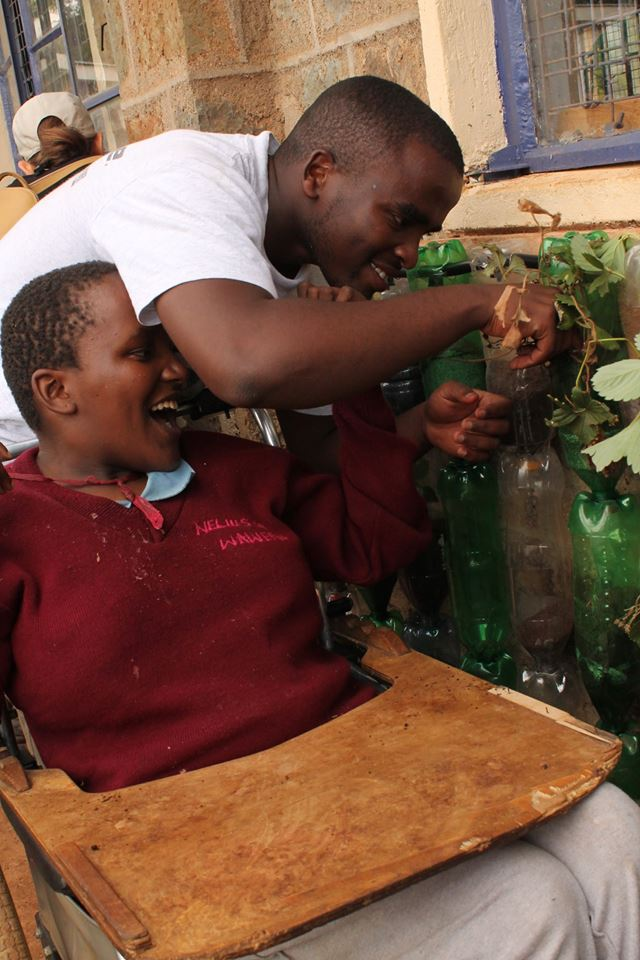

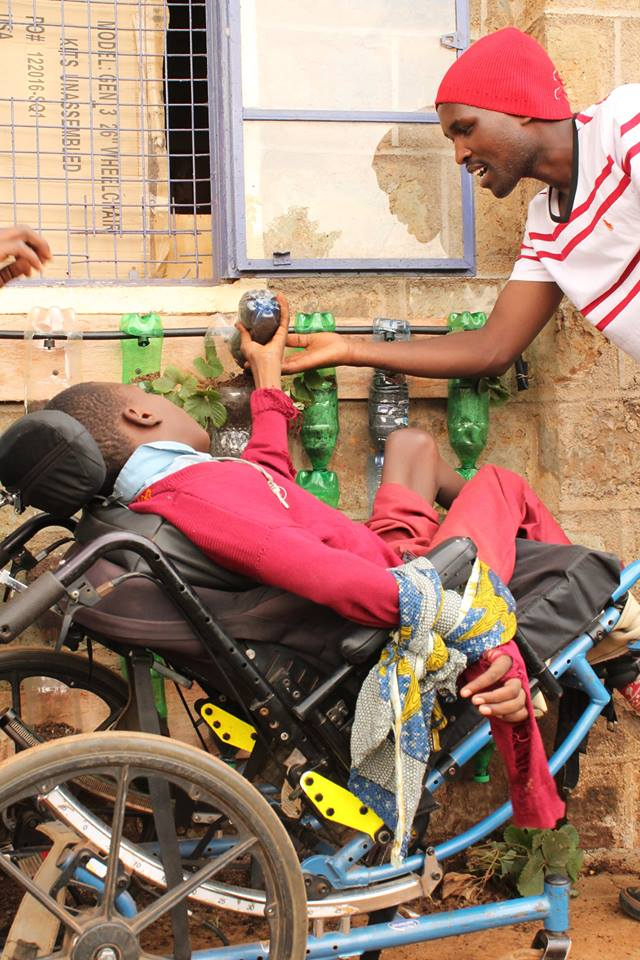
