= Mugo (name) =

Mugo is a name of Kenyan origin that may refer to:

- Mugo Gatheru (1925–2011), Kenyan author on colonial Kenya
- Mugo Kibiru, 19th-century Kenyan prophet from the Kikuyu tribe
- Beth Wambui Mugo (born 1939), Kenyan politician and Member of Parliament for the Party of National Unity
- Hellen Mugo (born 1985), Kenyan marathon runner and 2012 Košice Peace Marathon winner
- Micere Githae Mugo (1942–2023), Kenyan writer, academic and social activist
- Naomi Mugo (born 1977), Kenyan middle-distance runner and two-time African champion
- Samuel Muturi Mugo (born 1985), Kenyan marathon runner and winner of the 2009 Beijing Marathon
- Stanley Mugo Mwaura (nickname-Washukalli) (born 1954). Kenyan educationist who initiated largescale ECDE teacher training (1981) together with Kenya YMCA.

== See also ==
- Mugo, Korean court dance
