= Kamuiru =

- Location within Kenya
- Coordinates: 0.48°S 37.23°E
- Country: Kenya
- Province: Central Province
- Time zone: UTC+3 (EAT)

Kamuiru is a settlement in Kenya's Central Province. Kamuiru is among the most populated places in central Kenya and has a very rich history of the Mau Mau as a concentration camp. This is the place where revolutions began where the villagers led by boda-boda motorists got fed up with the Mungiki at Kagumo, Kirinyaga. Kamuiru is a village situated approximately 500M from Kagumo. During this period, in April 2009, the Vigilantes or Kenda-Kenda Rebellion (9-9 Rebellion) had a 'Court' christened the Hague.

In the beginning, a suspect would be arrested and taken for trial at the vigilante Kangaroo court — popularly known as The Hague, in Kamuiru, a village between Baricho and Kagumo trading centres.

At the Hague held under a tree in an open field, Mungiki suspects were tried there and, if found guilty, were slashed to death and their bodies hanged from the tree.

The three students were killed after one of the vigilante group members identified them as being among a group of young people who were taking an oath at Kamwiru at the weekend.

Some of the schools at Kamuiru include: Kamuiru Boys High School, Kamuiru Primary School, Summit Academy among others. The Member of Parliament for Kirinyaga Central Constituency, Hon. Joseph Gitari (Engineer) is a former student of Kamuiru High School.
