= Ituru =

- Location within Kenya
- Coordinates: 1°S 36.92°E
- Country: Kenya
- Province: Central Province
- Time zone: UTC+3 (EAT)

Ituru is a settlement in Kenya's Central Province. It is in Gatundu South constituency, Kiambu County. Proximate towns are Gatundu (south), Ruiru (south west) and Juja (South east). Other villages neighbouring Ituru includes, Giathi, Gaithece, Gitundu, Itwiku, Muthurumbi, Giathi and Kagumoini.

== Ethnic community and religion ==
Ituru belongs to rural highland north of capital Nairobi. Local people are mainly of the Kikuyu people also called the Agikuyu. The settlement also has several people from other ethnic groups in Kenya present in the region for business purposes.

The people in this town are mostly Christians. Only churches are present, including St Stephen Wamukaya Catholic church PCEA Ituru Church AIPCA Muthutumbi church

== Economic activities ==
The main economic activity in Gatundu town is business. Businessmen and businesswomen in this town do their day-to-day activities in various businesses. An open-air market in the town attracts many buyers and sellers from the neighboring villages. There is only one supermarket called Happy Supermarket and several general stores.

The neighboring villages are agricultural productive and therefore feeds the market with agricultural commodities (Silver Chase, 2013).

== Transport and communication ==
The local public service vans, minibuses and taxis play a major role in transport industry of this town. Vans (also called matatus) transport passengers from the town to other towns including Nairobi city, Thika, Ruiru, Juja and Kamwangi towns. A big challenge is the road network. Except the roads connecting the town to Nairobi and Thika, all the other roads are dry weather roads which makes it impassable during rainy seasons to connect to the highly productive villages.

Motorbikes also called "bondabondas" are common in this place and therefore competing with taxis which transport people to areas not covered by matatus.

The area is covered well by the local mobile service providers in Kenya namely safaricom, Yu, Orange and Airtel. Mobile phones are therefore commonly used as the means of communication. Several cyber cafes also assist with internet services.

There is also Gatundu Post Office.

== Academic institutions ==
The place lacks adequate institutions of higher learning. Nonetheless, there are several academic institutions:

=== Secondary institutions ===
1. Ituru High school
2. muthurumbi High school

=== Primary institutions ===
1. Ituru Primary School
2. Kagumoini Primary school
3. Muthurumbi primary school
