= Jamleck Irungu Kamau =

Kenyan politician

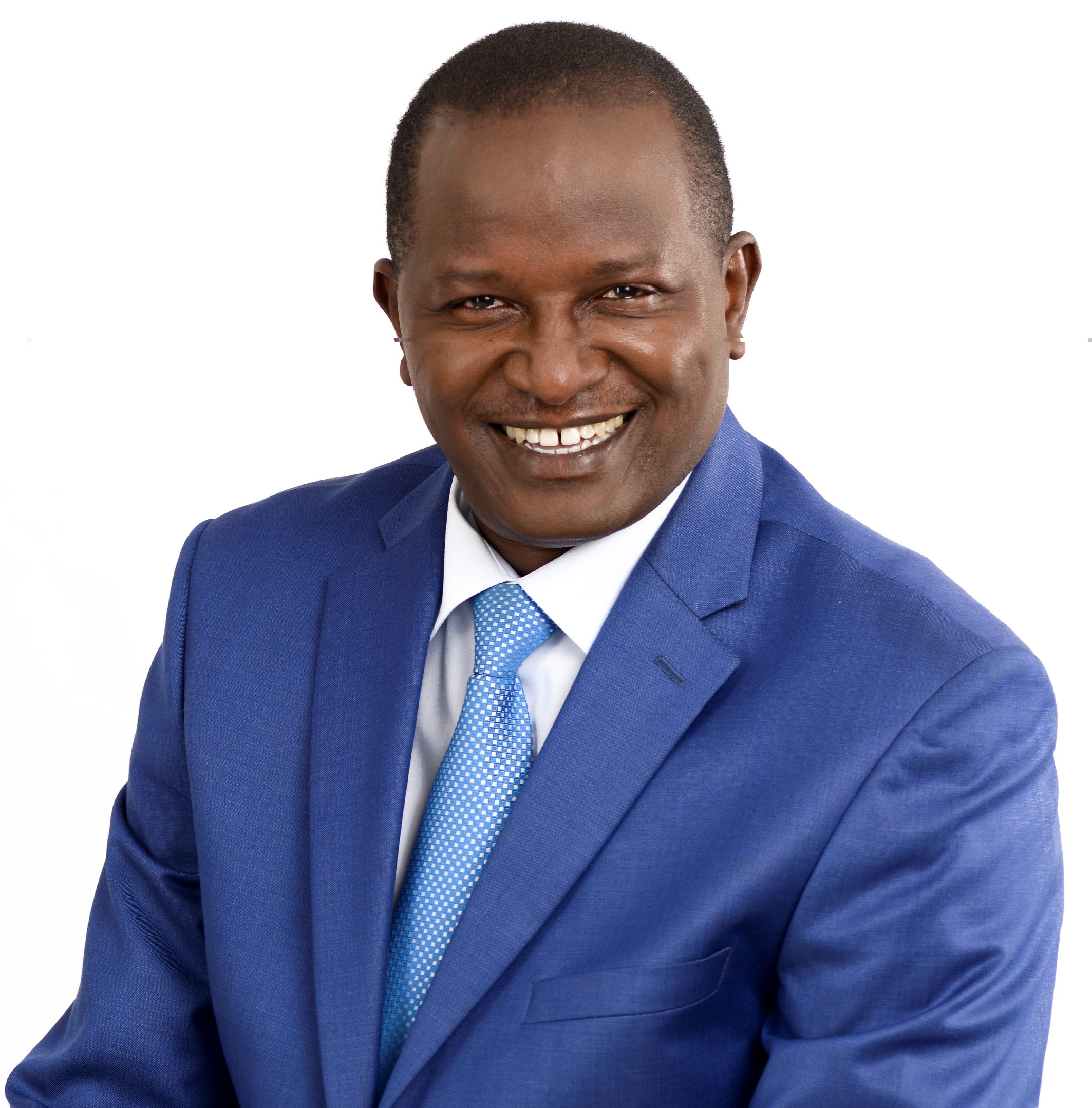

Member of Parliament for Kigumo
- In office 2007–2017
- Preceded by: Onesmus Kihara Mwangi

Personal details
- Born: 10 May 1965 (age 60)
- Children: 6

Jamleck Irungu Kamau, also known as "Kabisa Kabisa" (born on 10 May 1965), was a Member of Parliament (MP) from 2007 to 2017 representing Kigumo Constituency, a sub-county in Murang'a County, Central Kenya. He is the son of Kamau Muchunu from Kigumo.

== Political career ==
- Jamleck Kamau was first elected to represent the Kigumo Constituency in the National Assembly of Kenya during the Kenyan parliamentary election, 2007 through the Party of National Unity (PNU).

Jamleck was Minister for Nairobi Metropolitan during the helm of third President of Kenya Mwai Kibaki.

- During the 2013 General election, he was re-elected on a platform that simultaneously built on his record as a minister and MP and his strong support for the newly formed political party of establishment presidential candidate Uhuru Kenyatta, The National Alliance (TNA), which won the vast majority of parliamentary seats in Central Kenya and, together with the United Republican Party (URP) of William Ruto, went on to form a government under what was dubbed the "Jubilee" Alliance in 2013.
- Mr Kamau has voted in favour of all government-sponsored motions in parliament.

Jamleck is credited as having been at the helm of Nairobi Metropolitan when CCTV cameras were installed in all major roads within the city in 2012.

- The cameras in the 41 major locations were identified to curb crime and traffic offences in Nairobi.

It was also during his reign that Murang'a, Machakos, Kajiado and Kiambu counties were incorporated into the Nairobi metropolitan area.

- The Nairobi Metropolitan Area, NAMATA, is mandated to among others manage a sustainable, integrated, efficient and reliable public transport system.

NAMATA is also responsible for coordinating all matters relating to Mass Rapid Transit System as well as coordinate the planning, routing and regulation of transport facilities and services required for the transportation of freight within the metropolitan area.

- In the run-up to the 2017 general election, Kamau emerged as the presumptive opponent to Francis Mwangi "Wa Iria" for the post of County governor for Murang'a, with their rivalry drawing various county leaders to openly support either camp.

In what appeared to be an indication of support by national players of the Jubilee alliance, Mr Kamau hosted parliamentary majority leader Adan Duale and other Jubilee bigwigs during his meetings and meet the people campaigns.

- Jamleck however lost the hotly contested Jubilee party nominations.
- He would then make his stand that despite a court ruling that favored his argument of there having been massive irregularities in the party nominations, he would let the governor serve his second term for the sake of peace.
- He further stated that he would not resign as a member of Jubilee party, a stand he holds to-date.

Jamleck has already kicked off his Governor bid for the 2022 General Election after the lapse of current county boss Mwangi wa Iria.

== See also ==
- Politics of Kenya
