= Mbari =

Mbari may refer to:

- Monterey Bay Aquarium Research Institute, an oceanographic research center in California, US
- Mbari-ya-hiti, a village in Kenya
- Mbari-ya-Igi, a village in Kenya
