= Mjini =

- Location within Kenya
- Coordinates: 0.72°S 37.15°E
- Country: Kenya
- Province: Central Province
- Time zone: UTC+3 (EAT)

Mjini is a settlement in Kenya's Murang'a country, in the Central Province. Mjini is among the oldest settlements in Central Kenya. It was established in the late 1880s by Arab Swahili traders who came into Gikuyuland searching for ivory. The earliest existing Muslim mosque in Central Kenya was established in 1894 by two brothers, Sheikh Abeid Mubarak Dorman and Mohamed Mubarak Dorman.
