= George Ndung'u Mwicigi =

Kenyan politician

George Ndung'u Mwicigi (1932/33–4 March 2016) was a Kenyan member of parliament representing Kandara Constituency in Murang'a County.
