= Catherine Kiguru =

Kenyan computer scientist, entrepreneur and corporate executive

- Born: 1987 (age 38–39); Kenya
- Citizenship: Kenyan
- Education: Mary Hill High School, Thika (High School Diploma); Kiambu Institute of Science and Technology (Diploma in Computer Studies)
- Occupations: Computer Scientist, Entrepreneur & Corporate Executive
- Years active: 2007 – present
- Title: Founder & CEO of Ukall Limited, Nairobi, Kenya

Catherine Kiguru is a Kenyan computer scientist, entrepreneur and corporate executive, who is the founder and chief executive officer of Ukall Limited, a Nairobi-based software applications company that she established in 2011.

== Early life and education ==
Catherine Kiguru was born in Kenya, in a family of four siblings. By age 14, she had lost both her parents. She attended local primary schools, before she was admitted to Mary Hill High School, in Thika, Kiambu County, Kenya. She obtained her High School Diploma in 2004.

While in high school, she decided she wanted to study computer science after high school. The challenge was that she had decided not to carry physics and was weak in mathematics. With those odds stacked against her, she went and pleaded her case at the Kiambu Institute of Science and Technology. She was admitted on the condition that she would pass all her classes and tests in physics. She graduated in 2007 with a Diploma n Computer Studies.

== Career ==
While completing her diploma course, she interned at the Kiambu Water & Sewerage Company, in the town of Kiambu, about 15 kilometres (9 mi), by road, north of the central business district of Nairobi, the capital city of Kenya. When she completed her diploma course, the town of Kiambu employed her full-time. While there, she automated the Kiambu Water & Sewerage Company's billing system, improving their efficiency in distributing and tracking customer water bills in Kiambu County.

After a stint as a "relationship counselor" at KenCall, a call centre in Nairobi, Catherine was hired by Tracom International, a software development company, working in their customer support department as a software developer. She worked there for two years.

In December 2010, she developed "Akida", a mobile software application that uses GPS data and biometric characteristics to verify a person's location. She pitched the application to a corporate client, who bought into the concept. In January 2011, Ukall Limited was launched. By June 2016, the company employed seven full-time staff members and had clients in seven countries, including Kenya, Nigeria, Ghana, Tanzania, Zambia, Uganda and the United Kingdom. Her investment partner in Ukall Limited is Paul Rees, a chartered accountant.

== Other considerations ==
In 2013, Catherine Kiguru won the Best female entrepreneur ward at the GIST East Africa Startup camp.
