= Mararo =

- Location within Kenya
- Coordinates: 1.23°S 36.72°E
- Country: Kenya
- Province: Central Province
- Time zone: UTC+3 (EAT)

Mararo is a village settlement located in Kenya's former Central Province. The village is located in Githunguchu sub-Location, N'genda Location, Gatundu District, Gatundu South Constituency, Kiambu County. The village lies about 5 kilometres to the east of Gatundu Township.

The name mararo, meaning a sleep over place, was derived from workers who used to come to work in a coffee farm established by Kiruthu Kimiti. He was a senior employee in a white settler's farm about 10 kilometres further east towards Juja town. Whenever he brought workers from the settlers farm to work on his farm, they would not go back same day but stay over for sometime as he had put up a labour camp. That's how they named the village "the place of sleepover".

The main economic activity in Mararo village is subsistence, dairy, coffee and macadamia farming. In some cases farmers grow bananas and avocado fruits for both subsistence and commercial sale. Like in most rural villages in Kenya, youth unemployment and alcoholism are challenges experienced in the village.
