= Kandara Constituency =

Kenyan electoral constituency

Kandara
- constituency for the Parliament of Kenya
- Kandara Constituency within Murang'A County

- Murang'a County within Kenya
- County: Murang'a
- Population: 175,098
- Area: 235 km^{2} (90.7 sq mi)

Current constituency
- Number of members: 1
- Party: UDA
- Member of Parliament: Alice Muthoni Wahome
- Wards: 6

Kandara Constituency is an electoral constituency in Kenya. It is one of seven constituencies in Muranga County. It was one of three constituencies in the former Maragua District, Central Province. The constituency was established for the 1963 elections.

== Members of Parliament ==
Elections	MP	Party	Notes
1963	Bildad Kaggia	KANU	One-party system
1966	Thaddeo Mwaura	KANU	One-party system
1969	George Ndung’u Mwicigi	KANU	One-party system
1974	George Ndung’u Mwicigi	KANU	One-party system
1979	George Ndung’u Mwicigi	KANU	One-party system
1980	David Ngethe Waweru	KANU	By-election, One-party system.
1983	George Ndung’u Mwicigi	KANU	One-party system.
1988	Wilfred Mburu Kimani	KANU	One-party system.
1992	Gacuru wa Karenge	Ford-Asili	
1997	Joshua Ngugi Toro	Democratic Party	
2002	Joshua Ngugi Toro	NARC	
2007	James Maina Kamau	PNU	10th Parliament of Kenya
2013	Alice Muthoni Wahome	TNA	11th Parliament of Kenya
2017	Alice Muthoni Wahome	JUBILEE	12th Parliament of Kenya
2022	Alice Muthoni Wahome	UDA	13th Parliament of Kenya

== Wards ==
Ward	Registered Voters	Local authority
Ng'araria	12,391	Muranga county
Muruka	15,095	Muranga county
Kagundu-ini	18,237	Muranga county
Ithiru	16,703	Muranga county
Gaichanjiru	15,616	Muranga county
Ruchu	20,591	Muranga county
Total	98,633	
*September 2017,
