= Elias Mbau =

Kenyan politician

Elias Peter Mbau (born January 1, 1961) is a Kenyan politician. He belongs to the Party of National Unity and was elected to represent the Maragwa Constituency in the National Assembly of Kenya since the 2007 Kenyan general election.

He was first elected to the parliament at the 2002 elections on NARC ticket.
