= Kahaini =

- Location within Kenya
- Coordinates: 0.85°S 37.17°E
- Country: Kenya
- Province: Central Province
- Time zone: UTC+3 (EAT)

Kahaini is a settlement in located in Muranga County which is a part of Kenya's Central Province. Kahaini is approximately 62 km/32 mi northeast of Nairobi, Kenya's capital.

In December 2018, Brush Manufacturers announced its plans to relocate from Nairobi to Kahaini citing lack of expansion space in Nairobi. Brush Manufacturers acquired 100-acres of land to construct its new facility, which will be located in the future Kandara Business Park.
