= Kamune =

- Location within Kenya
- Coordinates: 0.6°S 37.02°E
- Country: Kenya
- Province: Central Province
- County: Murang'a

Area
  - Total: 6.5 km^{2} (2.5 sq mi)

Population (2019)
  - Total: 4,084
  - Density: 631/km^{2} (1,630/sq mi)
- Time zone: UTC+3 (EAT)

Kamune is a settlement in Murang'a County of Kenya's Central Province. As of 2019, it had a population of 4,084 across 1,277 households.

This is home for a legendary film-maker Samuel Njoroge a.k.a Muhindi who made one hitting movie in his vernacular, "Ngucanio Pt. I & II". It is also a home for another legendary Member of Parliament Hon. Clement Wambugu Muchiri. Kamune is in a newly created location known as Gathunya.
