= Ithenguri =

- Location within Kenya
- Coordinates: 0.47°S 36.97°E
- Country: Kenya
- Province: Central Province
- Time zone: UTC+3 (EAT)

Ithenguri is a settlement in Kenya's Central Province.

Ithenguri is a village located in Nyeri Central District, Nyeri County near the border between Nyeri Municipality and Tetu Division, it is in Ruring'u Location formally known as Mukaro Location and in Chorong'i Sub-Location. It is an agricultural area which is about 6 km away from Nyeri town. It has several facilities such as schools both private and public primary schools. the most renowned one is Ithenguri Primary School which has given rise to a new public secondary School known as Ithenguri Secondary School.

The most recent Development of Ithenguri Village is the construction of a Health Centre near Ithenguri Catholic Church which is due to be opened officially later this year (2013)
