= Kihuyo =

- Location within Kenya
- Coordinates: 0°23′6″S 36°54′49″E
- Country: Kenya
- Province: Central Province
- Established: 1850's
- Elevation: 1,400 m (4,500 ft)

Population (2009)
  - City: 20,000
  - Metro: 20,000
- Time zone: UTC+3 (EAT)

Kihuyo is an informal settlement in Kenya's Central Province, located seven kilometers from Nyeri town.

It neighbours the Njeng'u region, which is located in one of Kenya's largest coffee growing zones, and has one of Kenya's raw coffee berry processing facilities. The Sasini Coffee Plantation Facility has its own communal facility where fresh coffee berries are processed and dried for further processing later on. Kihuyo and the surrounding areas including Njeng'u also practice mixed-farming.

Kihuyo has two major public schools: Kihuyo Primary School and Kihuyo Secondary School. Additionally, it also has Muhoya Academy, a private academy school. Kihuyo's religion is primarily Christian. Major churches in Kihuyo are the Kihuyo Catholic Church, African Independent Church (AIPCA), Pentecostal Church of East Africa (PCEA), Kihuyo Local Church, and Full Gospel Church. No other religious groups make a significant impact.

The Kihuyo Shopping Center is a small marketplace characterized by small stone buildings, mostly single-storied, and an open public space; standing in the market center, one has a grand view of Nyeri hill. Kihuyo's water sources include Nyeri Water and Sewerage Company (NYEWASCO) and two rivers: the Muraria (Ihururu) river to the south and the Muringato river to the North.

== History ==
The first permanent inhabitants of Kihuyo first arrived in the period beginning the mid 19th century, having migrated northwards from the larger Tetu. At this time, Karuri wa Gakure then the chief in Murang'a was waging constant war against his perceived enemies in order to consolidate power, and as thus forced many rival chiefs to flee elsewhere with their people to where land was available. Kihuyo as is today began with rather traditional settlement of Chief Ndiyuini and his brother Ngambi with their wives, taking up land bordering Chief Wambugu wa Mathangania territory towards Nyeri and Chief Nderi Wa Ng'ombe towards Tetu.

Around this period, Mbogo, a wealthy man with many wives and animals also migrated to Kihuyo from the higher areas of Tetu, in search of pasture and land for his people and animals. Even today, Mbari ya Murathimi and Mbari ya Mbogo are the largest clans among the inhabitants of Kihuyo. Beginning early 20th century, with the arrival of the Italian missionaries at Mathari and the British colonialists, Ndiyuini surrendered 1,050 Acres of his land to allow the development of the missionaries station. This includes land today occupied by Nyeri High School, Kamwenja Teachers training college and St. Pauls Seminary, Consolata Mission Hospital-Mathari as well as tea and coffee plantations. That land has been a source of conflict and disillusionment among the present day descendants of Murathimi who maintain that Ndiyuini was duped to cede customary land to the detriment of their descendants who today occupy only a fraction of what used to be their land. In 2006, angry Kihuyo residents invaded the coffee plantation, now owned by the Catholic archdiocese (consolata mission) of Nyeri burned several acres of coffee.

Today, other inhabitants of Kihuyo occupy a smaller village upper west bordering the Aberdares National Park, an area called Nyarugumu. Nyarugumu was a settlement formed in the 1960s by Kenya's new independent government to resettle squatters from colonial villages from all over Nyeri, including many from Mukurwe-ini, Nyeri and Othaya.

== Culture ==
Gikuyu is the dominant language in Kihuyo, although most residents are also conversant with Swahili and to some extent English. Due to the relative seclusion of Kihuyo from the rest of Nyeri as a result of the Coffee and tea plantation buffer, there are not many visitors generally, although the people are warm and kind to visitors.

== Economic activities ==
Residents of Kihuyo are primarily farmers. Farming activities include dairy farming, tea, coffee and other subsistence crops like maize, potatoes, beans and horticulture. The main cooperative societies with operations in the area Mutheka Farmers Cooperative Society for the coffee farmers, which is the most dominant cash crop in the area and Ihururu Dairy Cooperative for the dairy farmers.
