= Kiawamururu =

- Country: Kenya
- Central: Central Province
- Time zone: UTC+3 (EAT)

Kiawamururu is a settlement in Kenya's Central Province. Its in Mukurweini subcounty, Nyeri County. In the area are Kiawamururu Primary School and Njiruini Secondary School.The Village also has a coffee factory.

The residents of this area are coffee and dairy farmers. They mainly sell milk to Wakulima Dairy, a milk processor based at Mukurweini township.
