= Mununga =

- Location within Kenya
- Coordinates: 0.7°S 37.02°E
- Country: Kenya
- Province: Central Province
- Time zone: UTC+3 (EAT)

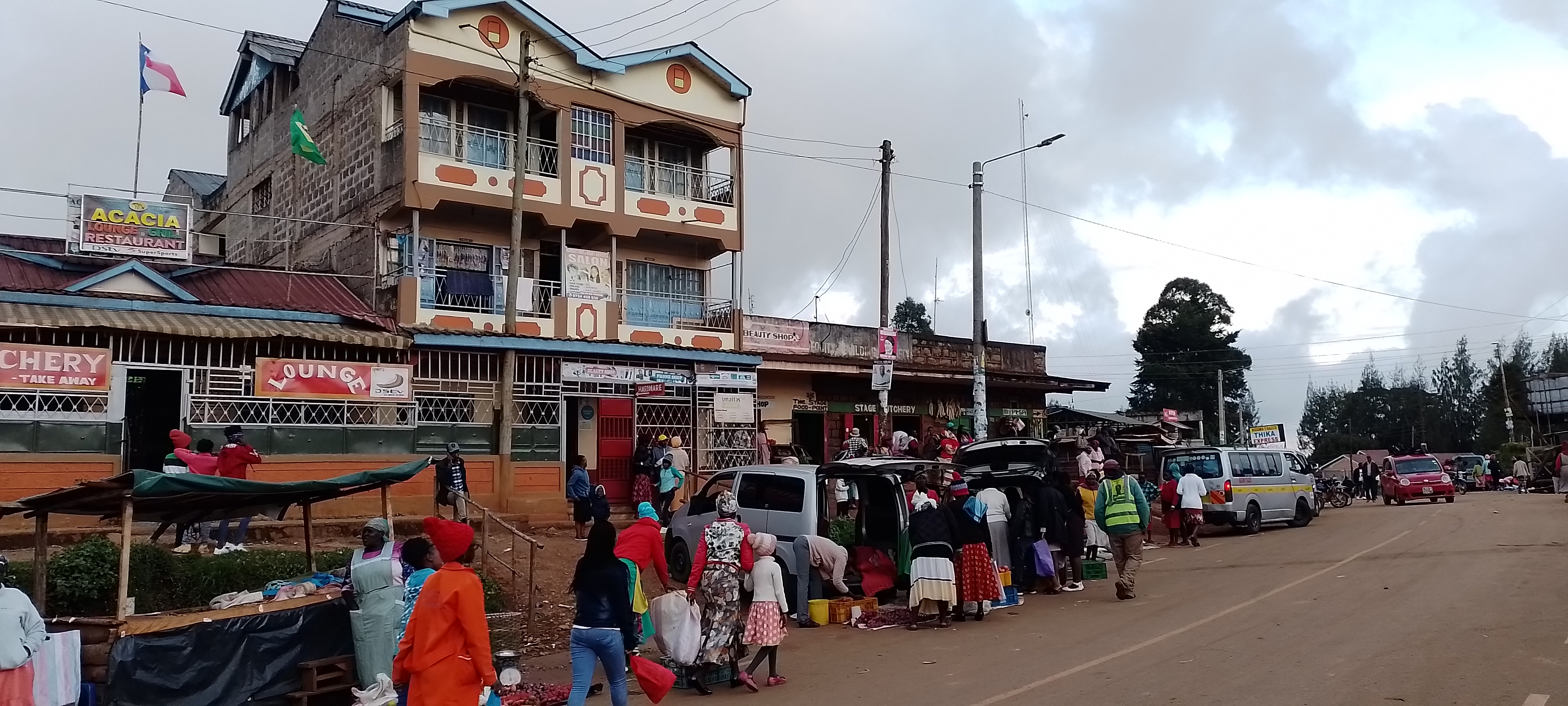
Mununga towards Gacharage

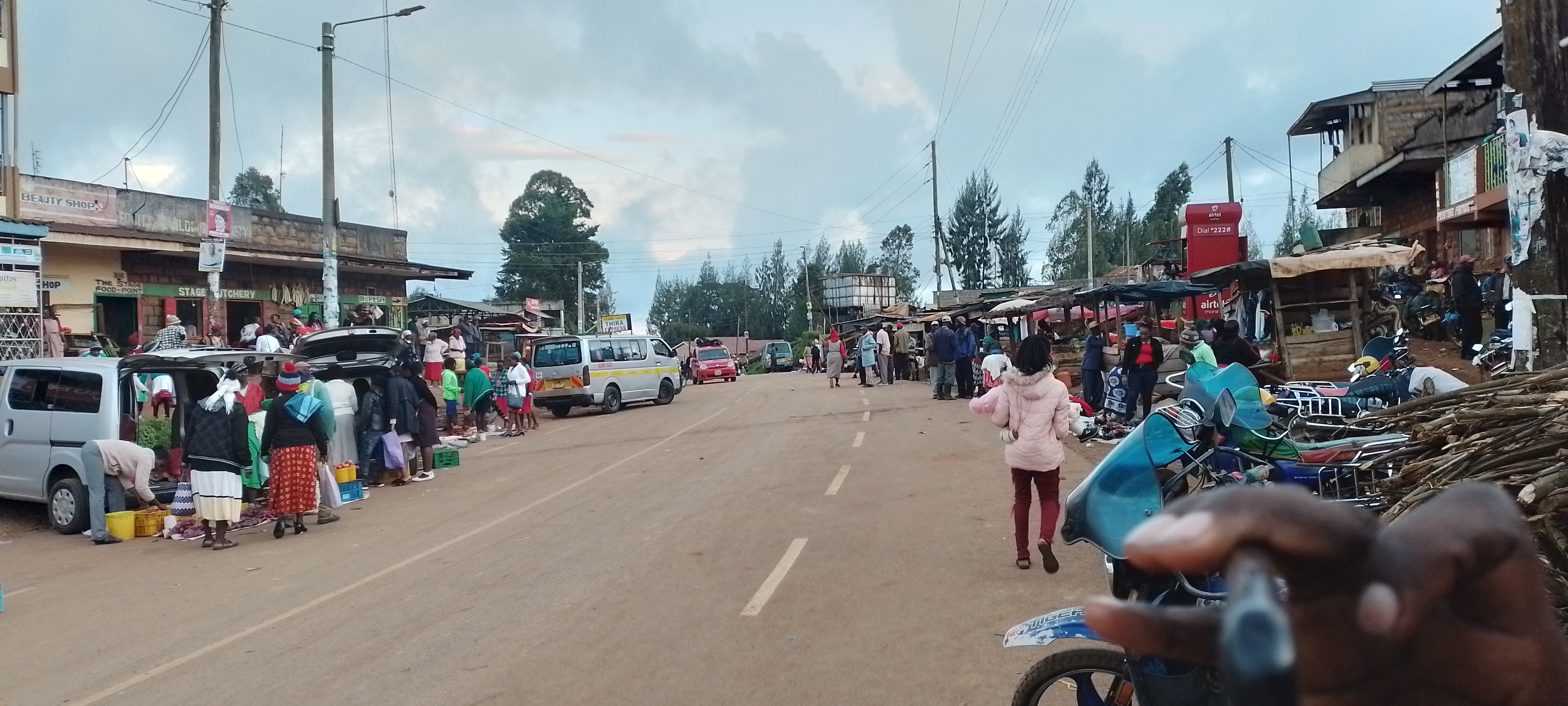
Mununga CBD

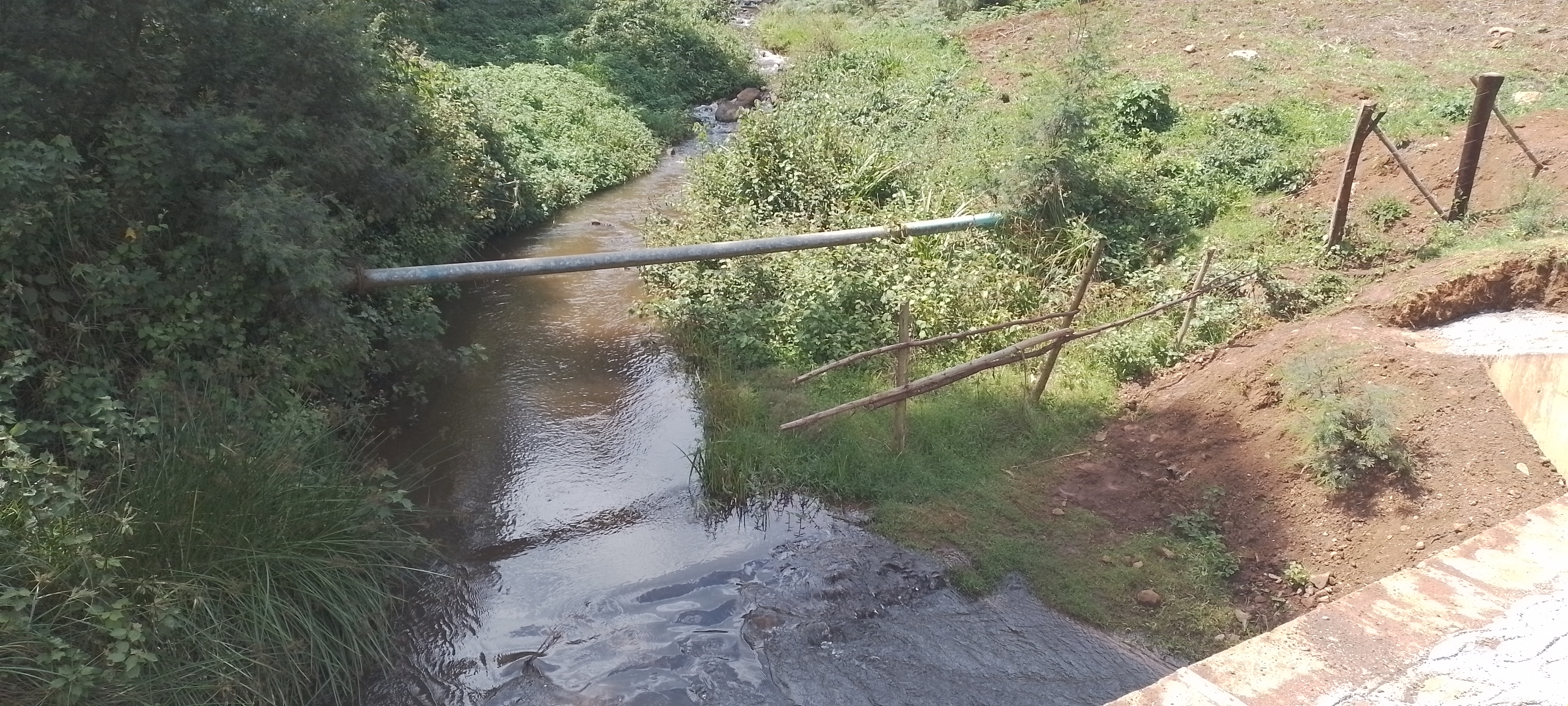
Gitaigua River

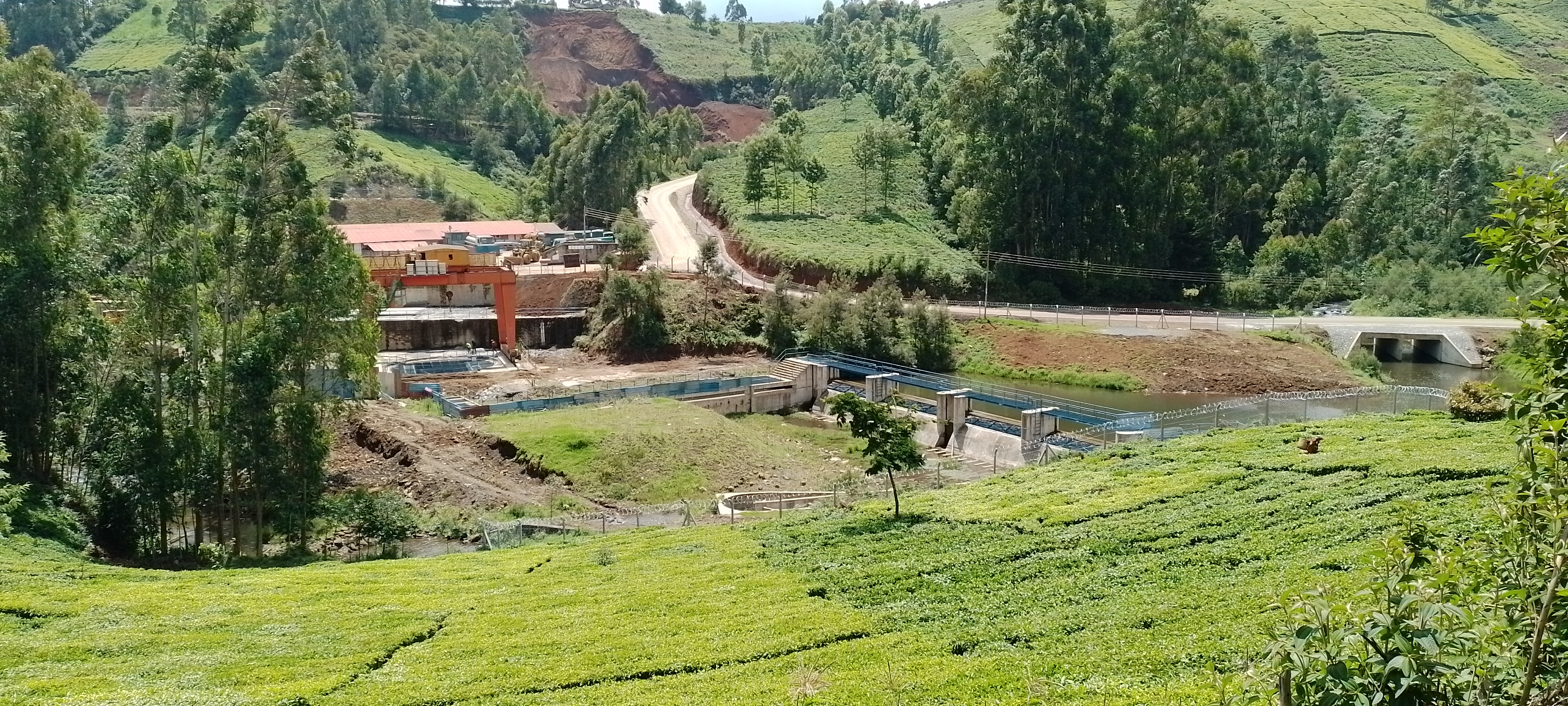
Irati shaft

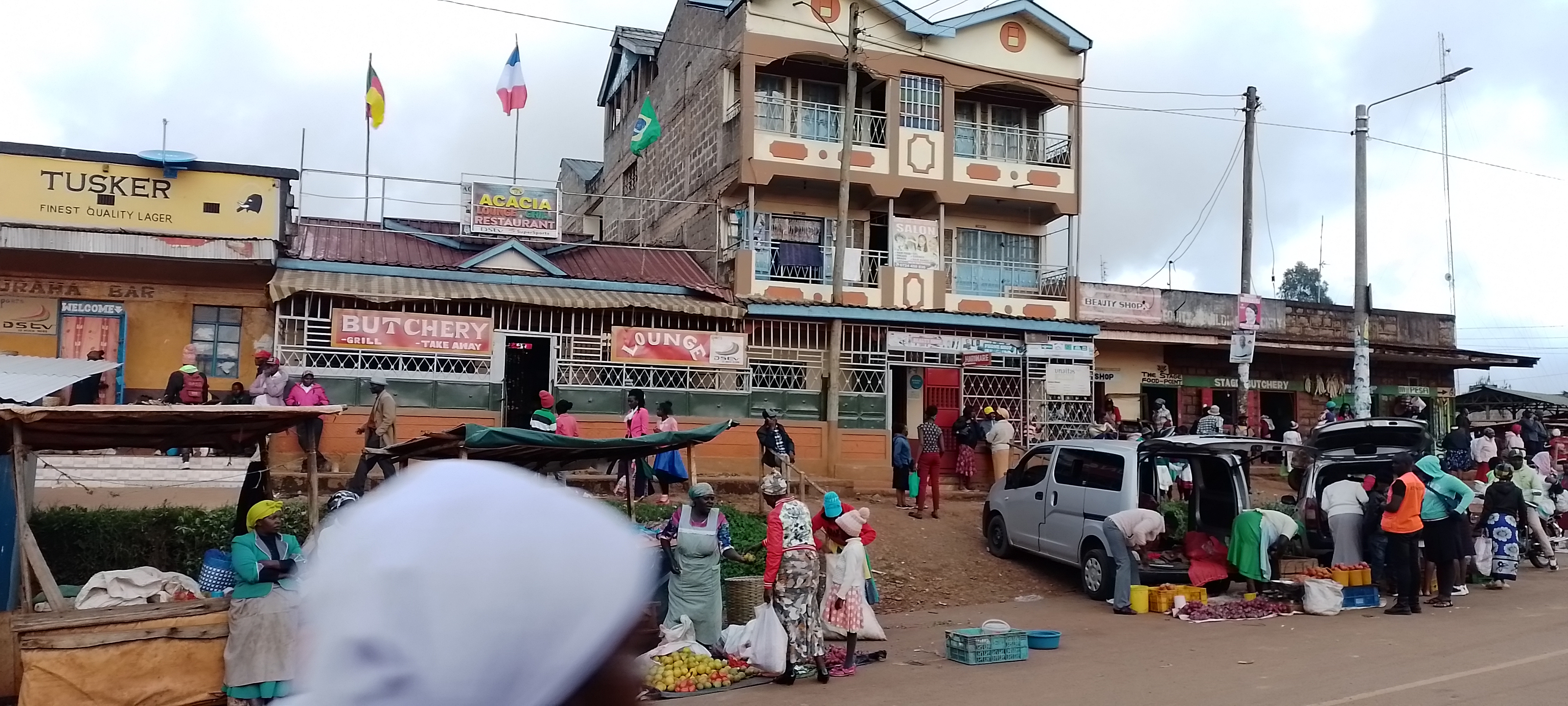
Acacia lounge

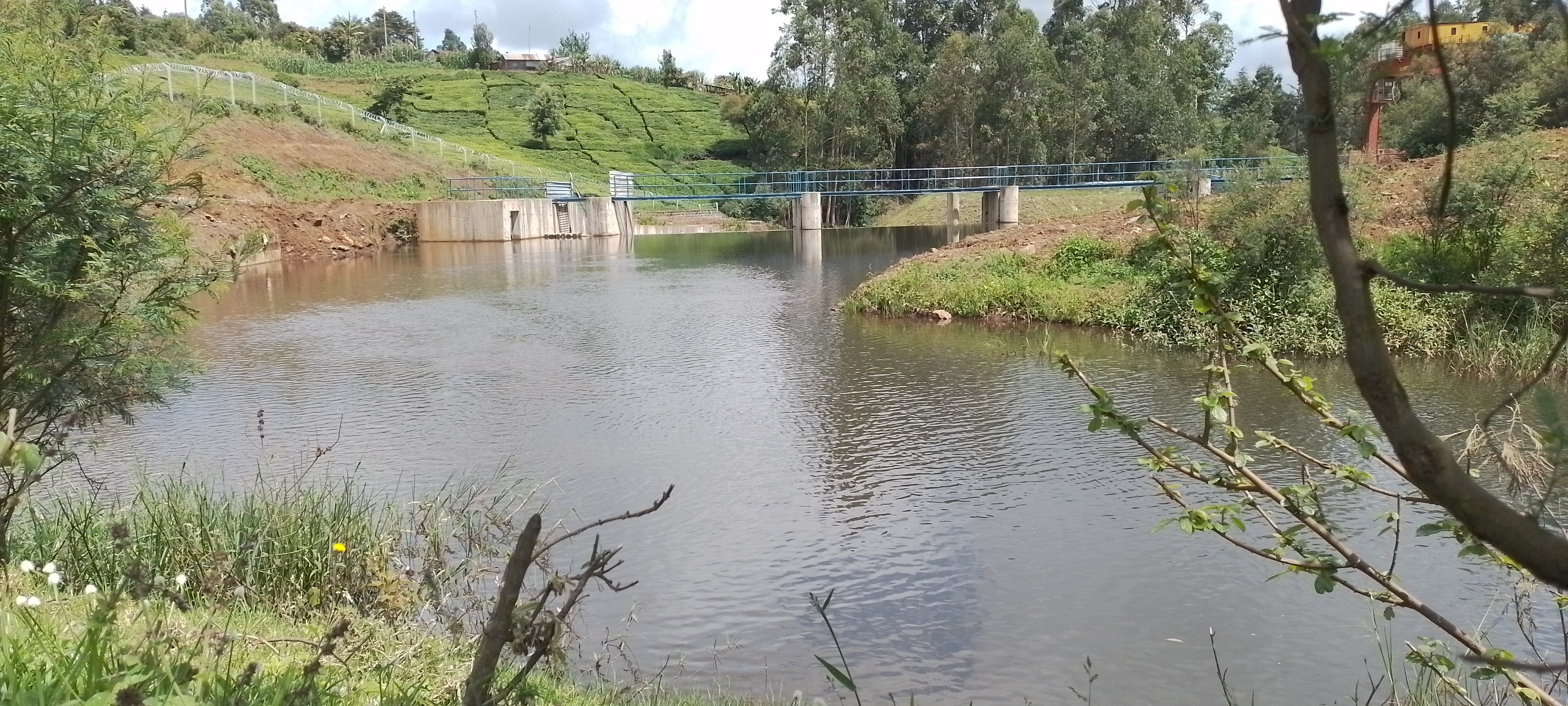
Irati dam

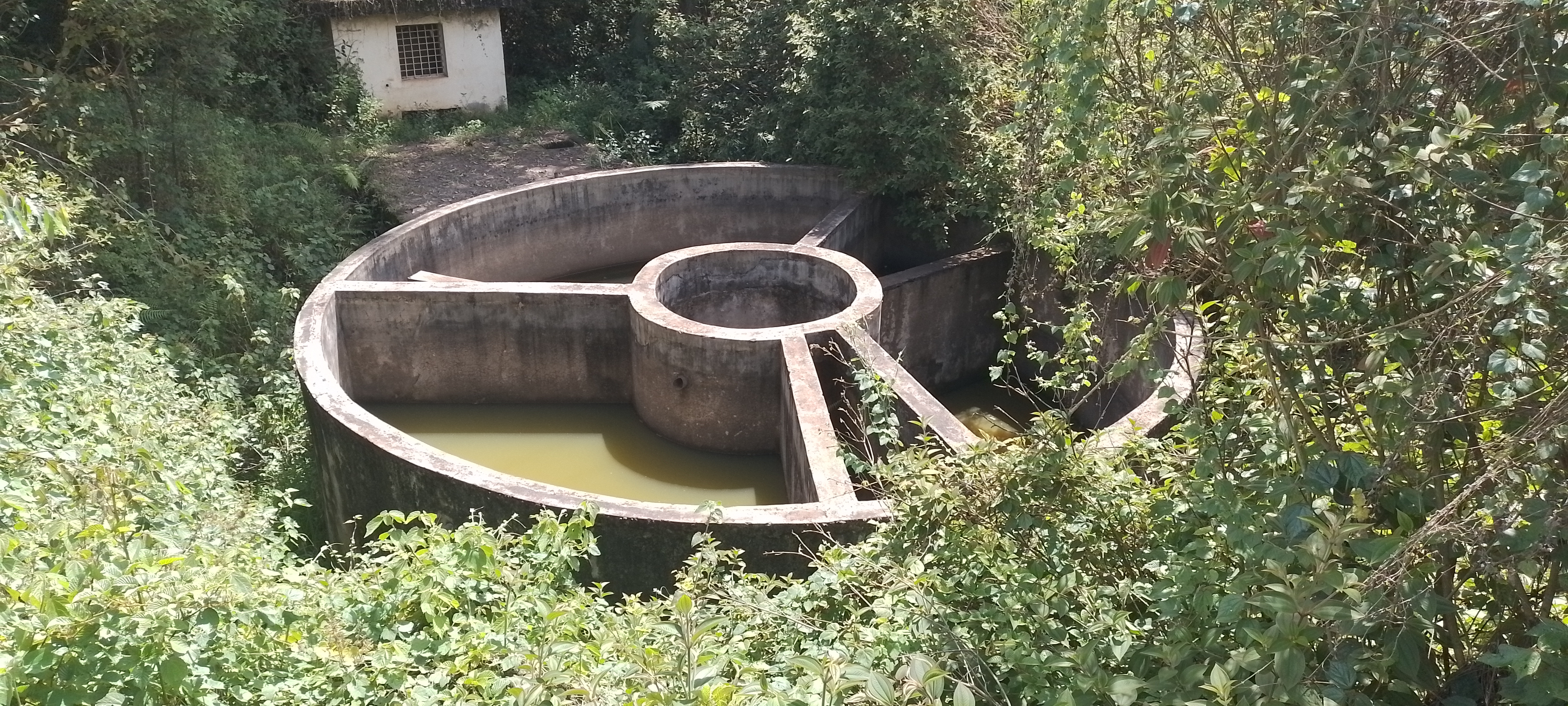
Abandoned Gacharage tea factory tank

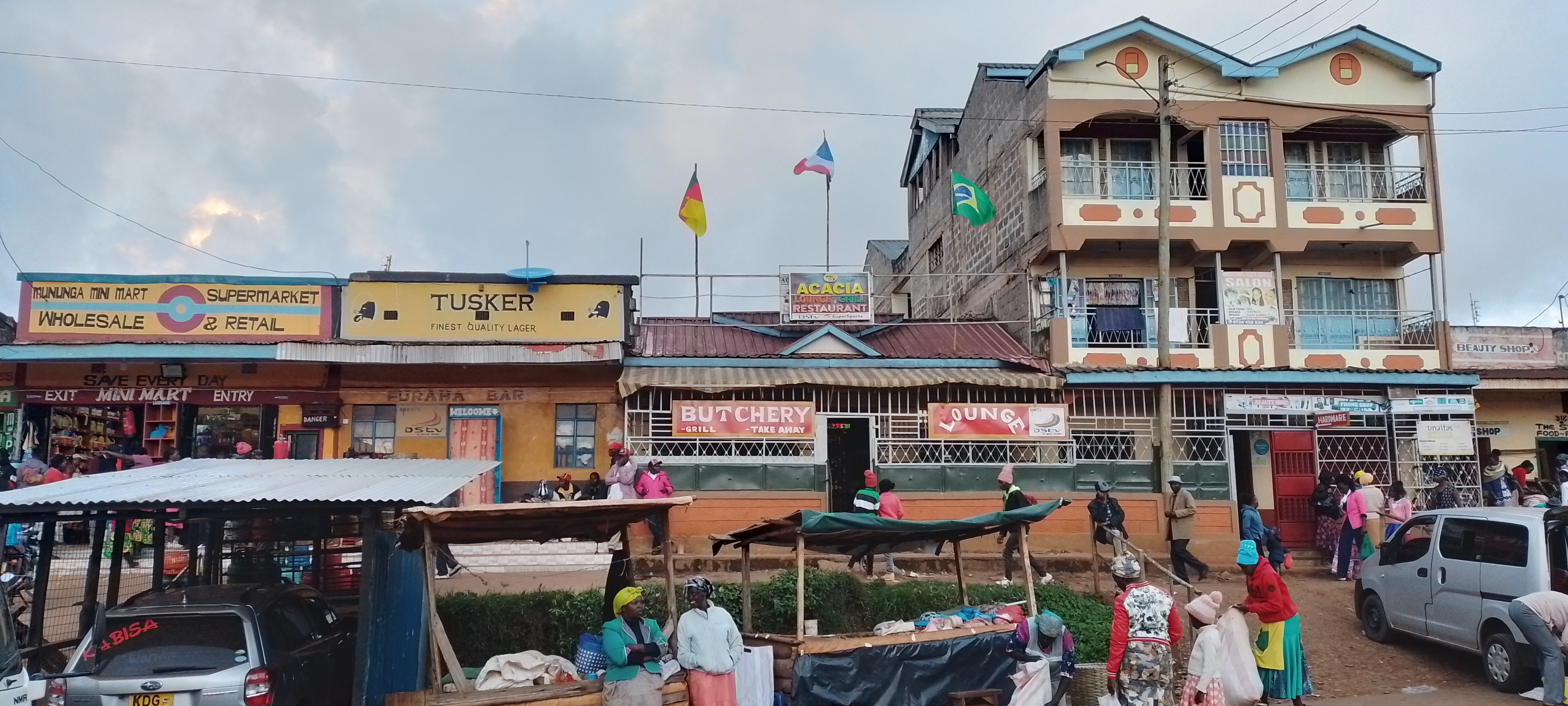
Mununga minimart and lounge

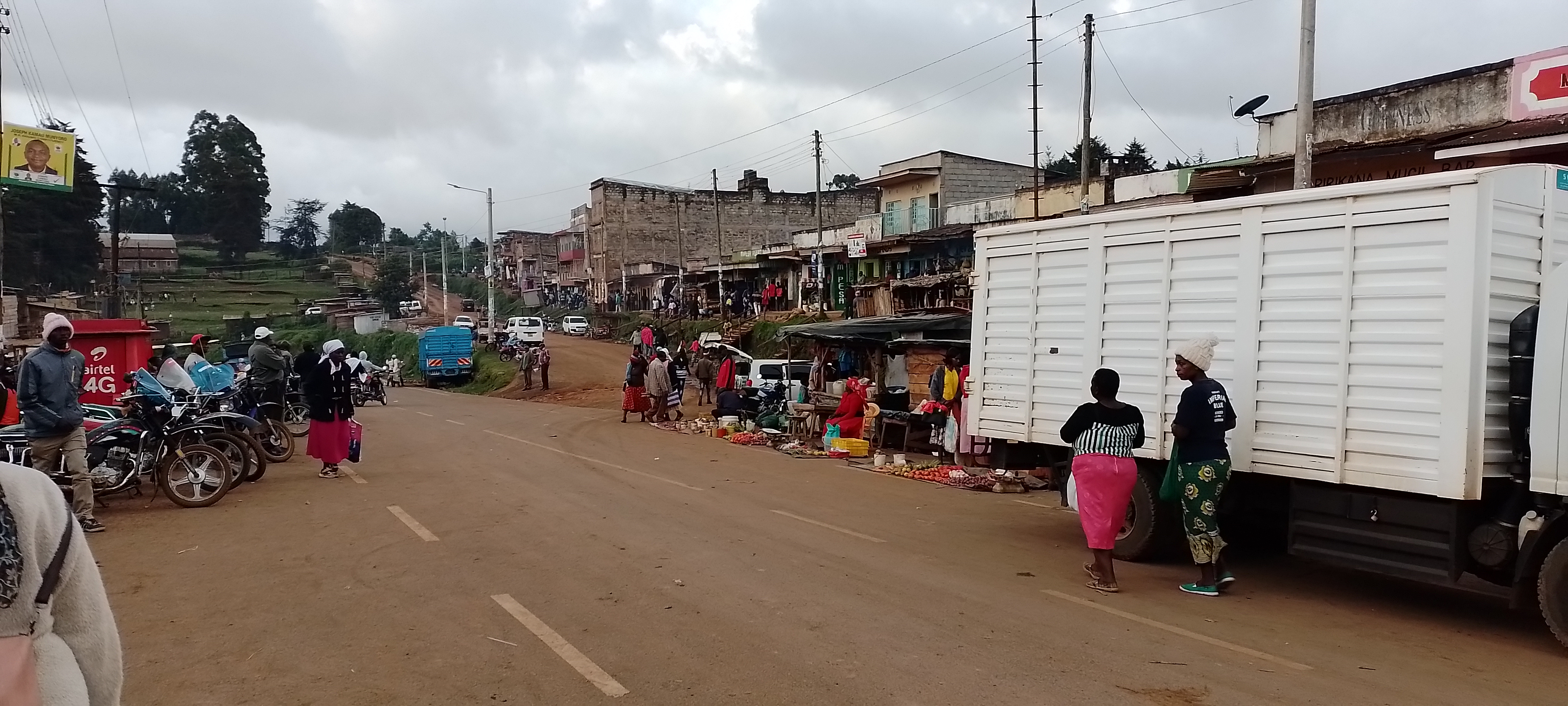
Mununga street

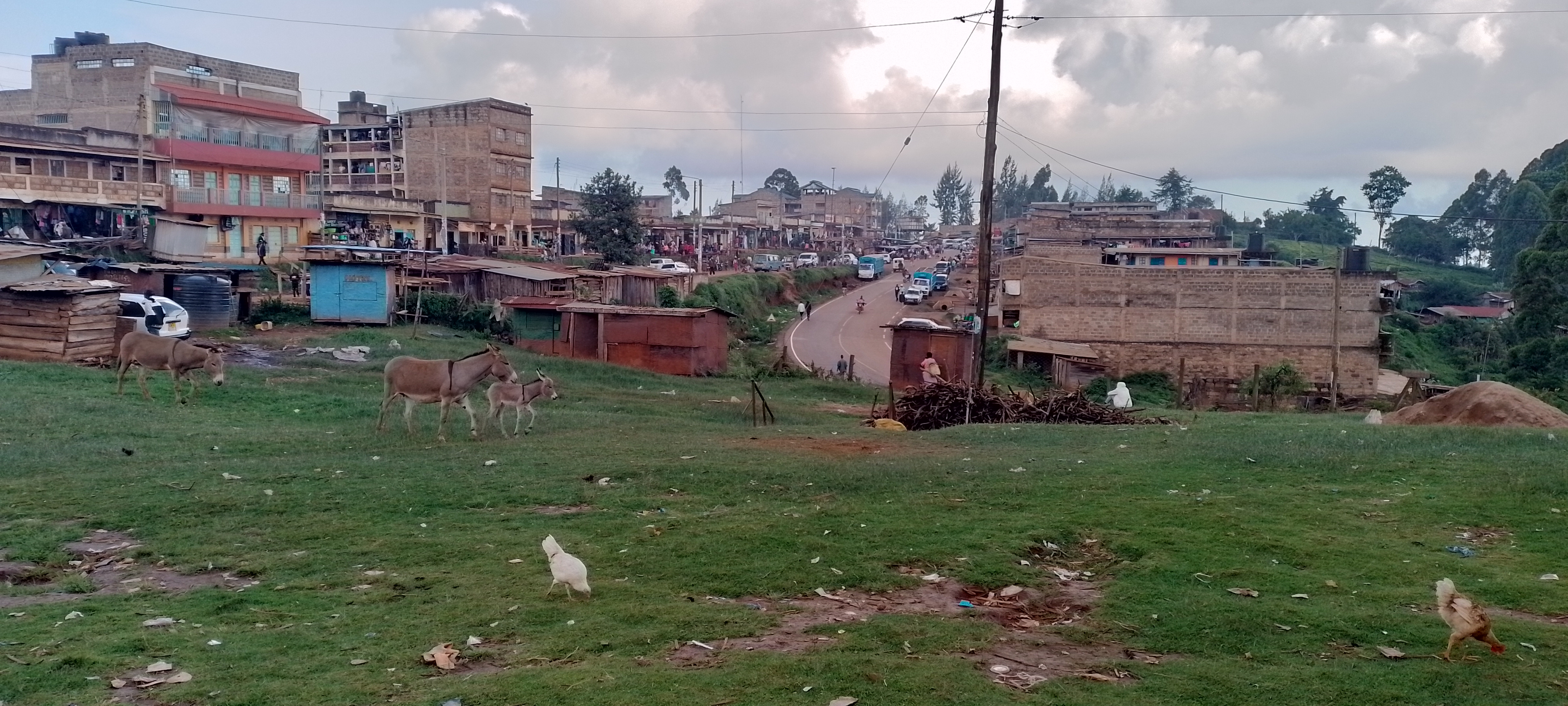
Mununga town 2022, December 11th

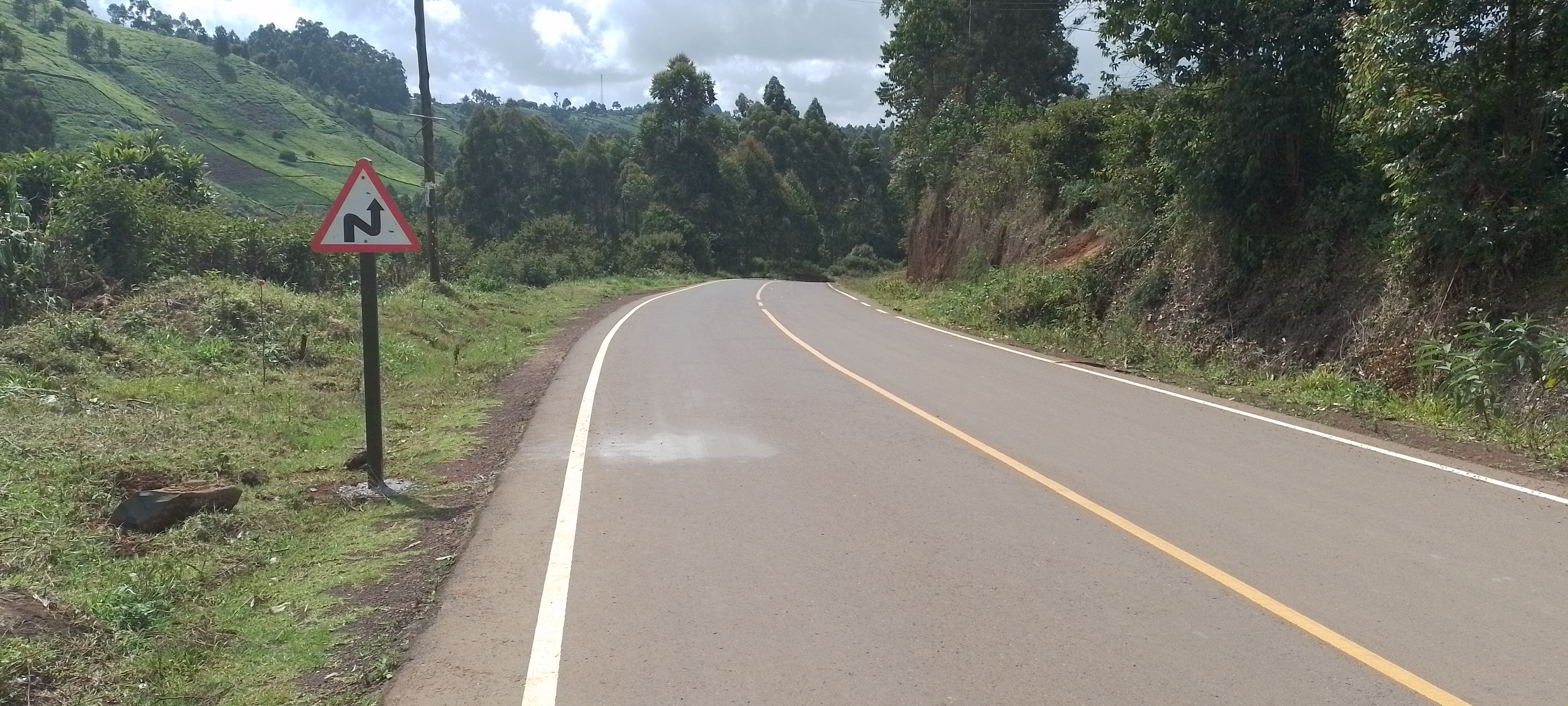
Mununga road

Mununga is a settlement in Kenya's Central Province. An alternate name for this area is "Mununca".

Mununga is in central Kenya, Muranga county. It sits in the Kigumo constituency, inside the Kinyona location. Mununga is a Kikuyu name meaning "smelling place." Mununga was known as Gitegenye, but later in the 1950's, received its name 'mununga' from the foul smell of unburied, decomposing bodies of anti-British resistance troops. Said troops allegedly met their terrible death at the hands of Chief Njiiri wa Karanja; a royal and right man to the British Empire, who fought the Mau Mau resistance with all forces at his disposal. Mununga was one of rebellions' "bedrooms," where it is believed most Mau Mau generals held their warfare meetings here before retreating back into the Aberdare forest.

Mununga comprises several villages, including Kamahiga, Mahehe, Mukoma Gathaiti, Muchagatha and Kariti. The town is traversed by the Mau Mau Road, a development that has contributed to its rapid growth in Murang’a County.

The Irati river, Gitaigua and Maragua serves Mununga with pure mineral water from the mountain of Aberdare. Gacharage tea factory is also located in Mununga.
