= Maganjo =

- Location within Kenya
- Coordinates: 0.87°S 37.15°E
- Country: Kenya
- Province: Central Province
- Time zone: UTC+3 (EAT)

Maganjo is a settlement in Kenya's Central Province.It is located in Murang'a District, approximately 59 km from Kenya's capital Nairobi (Nairobi).

Maganjo is known for its coffee planting activities, a fine coffee which made the area to be known as “home of Kenyan coffee".
