= Gretsa University =

Private university in Kenya

- Motto: Quality Education for the Real World
- Type: Private university
- Established: 2006
- Founders: Samuel and Margaret Kibathi
- Accreditation: Commission for University Education
- Chancellor: Charles Klasson
- Vice-Chancellor: Peter Karanja
- Undergraduates: 150
- Location: Nairobi Garissa Highway, Thika, Kenya; 1°3′11.46″S 37°5′39.88″E
- Language: English
- Website: gretsauniversity.ac.ke

Gretsa University is a private university in Thika Municipality in Kenya that provides certificate, diploma and degree programmes. The university offers nine bachelor's degrees and one master's degree. It is located in Thika, Kiambu county along the Thika-Garissa road near Thika Town. It is approximately 50km northeast of Nairobi.

== History ==
Gretsa University opened in September 2006 after receiving the Letter of Interim Authority from the Commission for Higher Education in May 2006. It was founded by Samuel and Margaret Kibathi, who owned various businesses including the Sagret hotels. The university's name is a portmanteau of their names: Margaret and Samuel. The Sagret hotel in Thika was the initial location of the university. Instruction began with three degree programmes: Business, Computer Science, and Hospitality Management.

In 2012, the university opened a satellite campus in Mwingi.

In November 2025, Gretsa was awarded a full charter by the Kenyan government, replacing the interim authority that it had been operating under since 2006. It became the 31st private chartered university in Kenya.

=== Investigations ===
In 2017, it was discovered that the university had been offering coursework for medical laboratory technicians that had not been accredited by the approval agency.

In 2018, the university was audited as part of an investigation into allegations that Mombasa governor Hassan Joho's degree from the school was fraudulent. The audit uncovered unrelated grading fraud that led the Commission of University Education to recommend revoking the university's Letter of Interim Authority.

== Academics ==
Kenya's Commission for University Education has accredited the university's programmes for the following degrees:

- Bachelor of Arts in Community Development
- Bachelor of Business Administration
- Bachelor of Commerce (BCom) in the following options: Accounting, Business Administration, Credit Management, Human Resource, Management, Enterprise Development, Finance, Marketing, Purchasing and Supply Chain Management
- Bachelor of Science in: Computer Science, Hospitality Management, Hospitality and Tourism Management
- Bachelor of Education (Arts) in any two of the following subjects: English, Literature in English, Kiswahili, C.R.E, History, Geography, Mathematics, Business Studies.
- Master of Education

The university also offers the following diplomas and certificates programmes, including Library and Information Science, Public Health, Information Technology, and Nutrition and Dietetics.

== Notable Alumni ==
- Ali Hassan Joho BCom, Governor of Mombasa County and Kenyan cabinet member
- Mohamed Tubi BA, Kenyan member of parliament
- Mary Wamaua BA, Kenyan member of parliament
