= Kabuku =

- Location within Kenya
- Coordinates: 1.15°S 36.67°E
- Country: Kenya
- Province: Central Province][County (Kiambu)

Area
  - Total: 2.1 km^{2} (0.81 sq mi)

Population (2019)
  - Total: 4,206
- Time zone: UTC+3 (EAT)

Kabuku is a settlement in Kenya's Central Province, in the subcounty of Limuru. As of 2019, it had a population of 4,206, divided among 1,312 households.

It is also the home of St. Paul's University's Main campus.

Notable people from Kabuku include the former Anglican archbishop of Kenya, Manasses Kuria.
