= Alice Wahome =

Kenyan politician (born 1959)

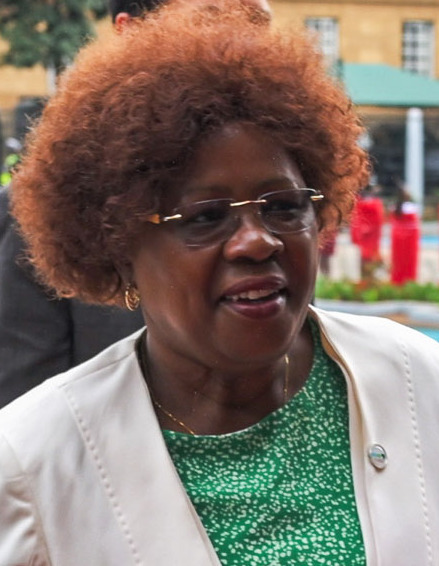
- Wahome in 2023

Cabinet secretary for Lands, Public Works, Housing and Urban Development
- In office 2022 – July 11, 2024
- Appointed by: President William Ruto

Member of parliament from Kandara Constituency
- In office 2013–2017

Member of parliament from Kandara Constituency
- In office 2017–2022

Personal details
- Born: Alice Mūthoni; 28 April 1959 (age 66)
- Party: United Democratic Alliance

Alice Mūthoni Wahome (born Alice Mūthoni, April 28, 1959) is a Kenyan politician. She served as cabinet secretary for Lands, Public Works, Housing and Urban Development. Wahome was the elected as Member of Parliament for the Kandara Constituency in the March 2013 general elections and successfully defended her seat in 2017 and 2022 prior to resigning her seat to join cabinet. Wahome is a member of UDA. She was later dismissed as a cabinet secretary in July 2024.

== Education and career ==
Wahome attended Karumu primary school and Siakago high school for her secondary studies. From 1980 to 1984, she attended the University of Nairobi, where she earned a bachelor's degree in law. She then earned a post-graduate diploma in law from Kenya School of Law in 1985 making her a lawyer by profession.

In 1988, she worked at the attorney general's chambers as a state counsel, and in 1989 she worked as a legal practitioner at A. M. Wahome and Company Advocates. Wahome is married to Mr. Wahome, and they have four children.

== Political career ==
She actively promoted affirmative action from 1999 to 2001 while serving as vice-chairperson of the Fida council.

She also served a two-year term on the council of the Law Society of Kenya.

In the 2013 Kenyan General election, Wahome was elected to represent the Kandara Constituency in parliament under a Jubilee party ticket. In the 2017 Kenyan general election, she reclaimed her seat under the ruling party and won a third term in the 2022 August elections on a UDA ticket.

After retaining her seat in the 2022 elections she resigned her seat after being nominated to cabinet as Cabinet Secretary for Water and Sanitation by President William Ruto. She was later relieved of the position on 11 July 2024.
