= Ruth Wangari Mwaniki =

Kenyan politician (born 1963 or 1964)

Member of the National Assembly for Kigumo
- In office 31 August 2017 – 9 August 2022

Personal details
- Born: Ruth Wangarì Mwanìki; 1963 or 1964 (age 62–63) Nyeri District, Kenya
- Party: Jubilee Party
- Education: University of Nairobi (LLB)

Ruth Wangarì Mwanìki (born 1963 or 1964) is a Kenyan politician who served in the National Assembly of Kenya from 2017 until 2022. A member of the Jubilee Party, she represented the Kigumo Constituency. During her tenure, Mwanìki was a prominent supporter of President Uhuru Kenyatta and was an advocate for the Building Bridges Initiative.

== Biography ==
Ruth Wangarì Mwanìki was born in 1963 or 1964 in the Nyeri District of central Kenya. She attended the University of Nairobi, receiving a Bachelor of Laws degree. Prior to her political career, she was the chief executive officer of the Export Promotion Council and the managing director of the Kenya Planters Cooperative Union.

Mwanìki ran for the National Assembly in the 2017 election, standing in the Kigumo Constituency as a member of the Jubilee Party. She defeated Joseph Munyoro, receiving 41,041 votes to Mūnyoro's 24,208. During her tenure, Mwanìki was a member of the Budget and Appropriations Committee and the Parliamentary Broadcasting and Library select committee. She was one of President Uhuru Kenyatta's most prominent allies in parliament, and lobbied the government for local improvements. She also advocated in favor of the Building Bridges Initiative, though most of her constituents opposed the proposal.

In the 2022 election, Mwanìki faced six opponents for re-election, including Mūnyoro, who ran as a member of the United Democratic Alliance. Mwanìki campaigned on further local improvements in infrastructure and agriculture, as well as "youth empowerment". However, she was defeated by Mūnyoro, placing third and receiving 27,213 votes to Mūnyoro's 8,810. The Daily Nation attributed her loss to a number of campaign errors, including her support for the locally unpopular BBI, her decision to frequently campaign with Azimio presidential candidate Raila Odinga, and a gaffe in which she stated she identified more with the Orange Democratic Movement than her own Jubilee Party.
