= Kereita =

Kereita Forest, Lari Sub County, Kiambu County
- Country: Kenya
- County: Kiambu County
- Time zone: UTC+3 (EAT)

Kereita is a settlement in Kenya's Central Province.

A Few kilometers from Kimende Town, Lari Sub-County, Kiambu County off the A104, Nakuru-Nairobi Highway, into the Kimende Town, is a Forest maintained by Kijabe Environment Volunteers (KENVO). One can find trails into the forest as well as a Waterfall. It is mostly unexploited by humans and tourists, and there are lot of Trees with medicinal value. There are more than 200 species of Birds, which makes it popular with Bird-watchers.

== History ==
The province is inhabited by the Kikuyu speaking community who are part of the Kenya Eastern Bantu.

During Kenya's colonization by the British, much of the province was regarded as part of the 'White Highlands', for the exclusive use of the settler community. Therefore, it saw political activity from the local communities who felt that they had an ancestral right to the land. This tension culminated in the 1950s with the Mau Mau rebellion; it saw the region placed under a state of emergency and the arrest of many prominent political leaders.

Kereita Forest was used as a hideout for the Mau Mau. Since independence, and the fact that the area was known to be MauMau hind out, it has been regarded as a site or a place of interest. The place Has multiple caves, which the MauMau fighters could have used as their hind outs and also as shelter.
