= Gathera =

- Flag

- Location within Kenya
- Coordinates: 0.8°S 37.0333°E
- Country: Kenya
- Province: Central Province
- Elevation: 1,772.00000 m (5,813.64829 ft)
  - Density: 4,180.24081/km^{2} (10,826.7740/sq mi)
- Time zone: UTC+3 (EAT)

Gathera is a settlement in Kenya's Central Province about 87 kilometers from the Kenyan capital of Nairobi.

== Statistics ==
There is an infant mortality of 44 per 1000 births. Malnutrition is apparent as 1.54% of children below five years old are underweight. Most of the land coverage is open broadleaved deciduous forest. The Cultivation Intensity is about 20% cultivated, and 80% natural vegetation.

== Schools ==
Gathera Secondary School is located at 2- 10205 Chinga-Kairu Road.
