= Mbogoro =

- Location within Kenya
- Coordinates: 0.95°S 36.85°E
- Country: Kenya
- Province: Central Province
- Time zone: UTC+3 (EAT)

Mbogoro is a settlement in Kenya's Central Province. Mbogoro constitutes Kiambu County, Gatundu Subcounty (formerly known as Gatundu District). The town is in Gatundu South Constituency and is on the furthest end Constituency where it borders Gatundu North (near Kang'otho). Kahungu River acts as the border between Gatundu North & South constituencies. Its inhabitants are mostly of the AGIKUYU community.

There is a public school in the area, which is known as Mbogoro Primary School. This school was founded in the mid 1990s. Many people attended it and it continues to offer education to the community. There are private schools e.g. ACACIA Academy on the east side of the town and is doing great. Religion The locality is religious with majority being Christians (About 99%) and others accounting for about 1%. Some of the denominations in the area include Presybeterian Church Of East Africa, Roman Catholic Church of Restoration, Faith Revival Centre, African Independent Pentecostal Church of Africa (AIPCA) and many more. The former PCEA Moderator Rev Ritho Gathanju was born and brought up in Mbogoro.
