= Ndunyu =

Ndunyu Chege
- Location within Kenya
- Coordinates: 0.82°S 37.03°E
- Country: Kenya
- Province: Central Province
- Time zone: UTC+3 (EAT)

Ndunyu is a settlement in Kenya's Central Province. The word means market in Kikuyu, the language of its Gikuyu inhabitants.

Ndunyu njeru (New Market) is nestled between Aberdare National Park, Kigio Conservancy and Mt. Kipipiri Forest Reserve. There is also Ndunyu Chege between the south-eastern edge of the Aberdare National Park and Thika Town.
