= Gaikuyu =

Gaikuyu Sub-location
- Location within Kenya
- Coordinates: 0.4°S 37.13°E
- Country: Kenya
- Province: Central Province
- Time zone: UTC+3 (EAT)

Gaikuyu Sub-location is a settlement in Kenya's Central Province, Nyeri County, Mathira Constituency.

Gaikuyu is primarily an agricultural region. Due to its cool climate, tea, which is the main cash crop in the area, grows well. Other crops that do well are maize, beans, potatoes, cabbages, tomatoes, carrots, fruits and vegetables.

Gaikuyu Sub-location hosts various learning, health and religious institutions. The learning institutions include Karatina University (Itiati Campus), Magutu Secondary School and Magutu Primary School. Religious institutions include PCEA Magutu Parish, Gaikuyu Catholic Church and ACK Gaikuyu Parish. Health facilities include PCEA Magutu Dispensary. Not much development in the small town since colonial times, old building that served as a maumau prison and others are still standing. Bars outnumber all other premises. However the new tarmac road may give Gaikuyu a new look and hope
