= Kamukabi =

- Location within Kenya
- Coordinates: 0.77°S 36.93°E
- Country: Kenya
- Province: Central Province
- Time zone: UTC+3 (EAT)

Kamukabi is a settlement in Kenya's Central Province.

Found between river Irati and maragua. It is about 15 km east of Gacharage tea factory.

It is a sub-location in kinyona location, kigumo division, kigumo district, murang'a county, central province, Kenya It is bordered by gikoe shopping centre to the west and gatumbi shopping centre to the east. The main economic activities in the area are: tea farming, coffee farming, dairy farming and other subsistence farming. The main shopping centre is ngonda. It has three secondary schools namely: Rarakwa secondary for girls, Kamukabi secondary which is a mixed school and Matu secondary. The primary schools found in the area are: Rarakwa pry, Kamukabi pry, Kiangai pry and Matu pry. It is one of the most populated centres in Kigumo constituency. The two rivers found in the area originate from Aberdare ranges. The climate of the area is mostly cool and wet. Its topography is hills and valleys. It also borders Kiharu constituency to the north. There are also some other streams in the area namely Karurumo, Kiangimbiri and Kiheho which play a major role in farming in the area. The main crops grown in the area are: tea, coffee, maize, beans, and horticultural products.
