= Kanyuira =

- Location within Kenya
- Coordinates: 0.65°S 36.9°E
- Country: Kenya
- Province: Central Province
- Time zone: UTC+3 (EAT)

Kanyuira is a settlement in Kenya's Central Province.
