= Ellinor Catherine Cunningham van Someren =

British medical entomologist

Ellinor Catherine Cunningham van Someren OBE
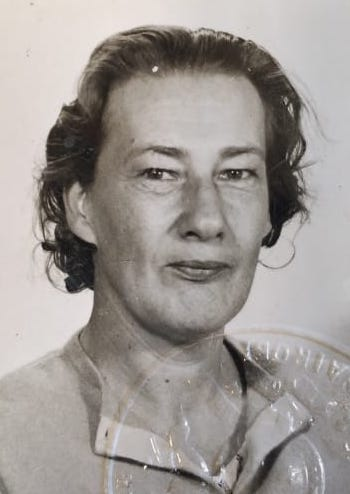
- Born: Ellinor Catherine MacDonald; December 4, 1915; Kampala, Protectorate of Uganda, British Empire
- Died: September 1, 1998 (aged 82); Nairobi, Kenya
- Education: Inverness Royal Academy
- Spouse: Gurner Robert Cunningham van Someren (m. 1940; died 1997)
- Children: 2
- Awards: Order of the British Empire
- Scientific career
- Fields: entomology
- Institutions: Health Service in Kenya

Ellinor Catherine Cunningham van Someren OBE (née MacDonald; 4 December 1915 – 1 September 1998) was a Ugandan-born British medical entomologist. She specialised in mosquitoes, identifying at least thirty-three new species while employed by the Kenyan Health Service and partaking in scientific surveys in Kenya, Tanzania, and Somalia. In 1962, she was a consultant on yellow fever to the World Health Organization. Van Someren was appointed an Officer of the Order of the British Empire in the Queen's Birthday Honours in 1974 for diplomatic services in scientific research overseas.

== Education and personal life ==
Ellinor Catherine MacDonald was born in 1915 in Kampala, Uganda. She was the daughter of William George MacLeod MacDonald, a Scotsman from Inverness who came to Uganda in 1908 to work in the Posts and Telegraphs Department, and Lucy Ellinor Tunstall, an Englishwoman from Mere, Wiltshire. Her father was later appointed as the Deputy Post Master General. She grew up in Nairobi and on her family's farm in Maragua.

She attended Inverness Royal Academy in Scotland. She did not study at university.

In 1940 she married Gurner Robert Cunningham van Someren (died 1997), who worked in pest control and later as an ornithologist. They lived in Karen, Kenya and had two children together. She died in September 1998.

== Career ==
From 1936 until 1973 van Someren worked as a laboratory assistant in the Division of Insect-borne Diseases of the Medical Research Laboratory in Nairobi, Kenya (later the Kenya Government Health Service). She became an expert in mosquitoes of East Africa including describing at least 33 new species and 3 subspecies, details of life stages and mosquito ecology. Control of these insects is important in public health since they are vectors of diseases including malaria, yellow fever and several types of encephalitis. She identified mosquitoes in several surveys of regions in Africa (Kenya, Somalia, Tanzania, Ethiopia) and islands in Indian Ocean (Madagascar, Chagos Islands, Seychelles). She drew many of the illustrations in her scientific publications. She acted as a consultant about yellow fever in 1962 for the World Health Organization. As travel around the world by aircraft was increasing at the end of the 1960s, she was involved in a survey of the diversity of mosquitoes found on planes travelling between Kenya and other regions in Africa, Asia and Europe. This identified 14 different species, and up to 24 individual mosquitos on each plane. Other fly species were also transported unintentionally on the planes.

== Publications ==
van Someren was the author or co-author of around 40 scientific publications including:

- Macdonald E.C. (1939) The larva of Aedes (Finlaya) pulchrithorax Edwards (Dipt., Culicidae). Proc R Entomol Soc London Ser B Taxon. 8 17–18.
- van Someren E.C.C. (1946) Ethiopian Culcidae: notes and descriptions of some new species and hitherto unknown larvae and pupae (Diptera). Trans R Entomol Soc Lond. 96 109–24.
- van Someren E.C.C. (1949) Ethiopian Culicidae—Eretmapodites Theobald: description of four new species of the Chrysogaster group with notes on the five known species of this group. Proc R Entomol Soc Lond Ser B Taxon. 18 119–29.
- Van Someren E.C.C., Teesdale C., Furlong M. (1955) The mosquitos of the Kenya Coast; Records of occurrence, behaviour and habitat. Bull Entomol Res. 46 463–93.
- Van Someren E.C.C.(1967) A check list of the Culicine mosquitos of Tanganyika, with notes on their distribution in the territory. Bull Entomol Res. 57 207–20.

== Honours and awards ==
Two species of mosquito (including Culex vansomereni), one subspecies and one subgenus (initially described as genus Vansomereni) have been named after her. In addition the bird black-headed apalis Apalis melanocephala ellinorae was named after her by her husband in 1944.

In 1974 she was awarded an honorary degree of Doctor of Technology by Brunel University and was made an officer of the Order of the British Empire during the Queen's Birthday Honours 1974.
