= Mary Wamaua Waithira Njoroge =

Kenyan politician

Mary Wamaua Waithìra Njoroge is a Kenyan politician. She is currently a Member of Parliament for Maragua Constituency in Murang’a County.

== Early years and education ==
She went to Kamahūha Girls High for her o level certificate and from 1983 to 1991. She proceeded to Kigari Teachers Training College and acquired a P1 certificate. From 2008 to 2009 she joined the KIHBIT in Kisii to pursue a Diploma in Civil Works-in Road Building. From 2014 to 2016 she furthered her education at Gretsa University and undertook a Bachelor of Arts comm. Development.

== Career ==
She was elected as a member of parliament for Maragua Constituency in 2017. She is a member of the National Government Constituencies Development Fund Committee in the parliament.

She was re-elected in the 2022 Kenyan general election.
