= Njega =

- Location within Kenya
- Coordinates: 0.62°S 37.32°E
- Country: Kenya
- Province: Central Province
- Time zone: UTC+3 (EAT)

Njega is a Kikuyu dialect word which means “Good” in English. However, there is a place called Njega's which was named after a traditional Chief by the name “Njega Wa Gioko” who was born early in 1865 and died in 1948 aged 83 it is believed that he was the most polygamist king to have ever been known by the Kikuyu tribe after marrying seventy-two wives. Some of his grandsons and great grandsons still dominate the place which cannot be geographically determined.

Njega Boys Secondary School together with Njega Primary School, are public education facilities in Kanyeki-ini ward, Kirinyaga Central in Kirinyaga County, situated approximately 2 km from Kagio-Kutus road. The grave of where the remains of the late king “Njega Wa Gioko" is believed to have been buried, is still well enshrined in the compound of Njega Secondary School. It is believed that the entire of Kirinyaga County piece of land belonged to Njega Wa Gioko and his old form of amassed wealth of livestock grazed on the Mwea Plateau. It is not yet well known why the Chief collaborated with the newly arrived white man.

This is the raw information as gathered by the facts and narrations from the local residents.
