= Githuri =

- Location within Kenya
- Coordinates: 0.72°S 37.2°E
- Country: Kenya
- Province: Central Province
- Time zone: UTC+3 (EAT)

Githuri is a settlement in Kenya's Central Province.

In spring 2021 Murang'a Water and Sanitation Company received and processed a grant to significantly increase water supplies to Githuri, and areas surrounding.
