= Kiambu West District =

Former district of Kenya

Kiambu West District was a former district of Kenya. It carved out of the former Kiambu District in 2005 and comprised all constituencies to the west of the Kikuyu, Wangige, Kiambu road. The district had its headquarters in Limuru town which is about 40 kilometres west of Nairobi and half a kilometre off the Nairobi-Nakuru highway (A104 road). Some of the divisions found in Kiambu west included Kikuyu and Lari.

In 2010, it was merged into Kiambu County.
