= Central Province (Kenya) =

Province of Kenya

Central Province Mkoa wa Kati
- Former Province
- Nickname: Watu wa Murima
- Location in Kenya
- Coordinates: 0°45′S 37°0′E
- Country: Kenya
- Capital: Nyeri

Area
  - Total: 13,199 km^{2} (5,096 sq mi)

Population (2009)
  - Total: 4,383,743
  - Density: 332.13/km^{2} (860.20/sq mi)
- Time zone: UTC+3 (EAT)

Central Province of Kenya surrounded the capital, Nyeri, and included the slopes of Mount Kenya (click to enlarge map).

The Central Province (Swahili: Kati, Gikuyu: Gichigo gia Gatagati) was a region in central Kenya until 2013, when Kenya's provinces were replaced by a system of counties. It covered an area of 11,449 km^{2} (4,420 sq mi) and was located to the north of Nairobi and west of Mount Kenya (see maps). The province had 4,383,743 inhabitants according to the 2009 census. The provincial headquarters was Nyeri.

Central Province was the ancestral home of the Gikuyu people.

== Climate ==
The climate of Central Province is generally cooler than that of the rest of Kenya, due to the region's higher altitude. Rainfall is fairly reliable, falling in two seasons, one from early March to May (the long rains) and a second during October and November (the short rains).

== General information ==
Central Province is a key producer of coffee, one of Kenya's key exports. Much of Kenya's dairy industry is also based in this province. The provincial headquarters were in Nyeri. Central Province was divided into seven districts (wilaya'at) until 2007:

District	Population	Capital
Nyandarua	479,902	Ol Kalou*
Nyeri	661,156	Nyeri
Kirinyaga	457,105	Kerugoya
Maragua	387,969	Maragua
Murang'a	348,304	Murang'a
Thika	645,713	Thika
Kiambu	744,010	Kiambu
* former capital: Nyahururu

=== Districts after 2007 ===
Several new districts (declared sub-counties in 2013) were created in 2007:

District	Capital
Gatanga	Gatanga
Gatundu	Gatundu
Gatundu North	Kamwangi
Githunguri	Githunguri
Kabete	Kikuyu
Kandara	Kandara
Kiambu East (Kiambaa)	Kiambu
Kiambu West	Limuru
Kieni East	Chaka
Kieni West	Mweiga
Kigumo	Kigumo
Kinangop	Engineer
Kirinyaga Central	Kerugoya
Kirinyaga East	Kianyaga
Kirinyaga South	Wanguru
Kirinyaga West	Baricho
Lari	Lari
Maragua	Maragua
Mathioya	Kiria-ini
Mathira East	Karatina
Mathira West	Kaiyaba
Mirangini	Mirangini
Mukurweini	Mukurweini
Murang'a North	Murang'a
Murang'a South	Kenol
Nyandarua Central	Ol Kalou
Nyandarua North	Ndaragwa
Nyandarua South	Njambini
Nyandarua West	Ol Jororok
Nyeri Central	Nyeri
Nyeri South	Othaya
Ruiru	Ruiru
Tetu	Wamagana
Thika East	Gatuanyaga
Thika West	Thika

== Counties after 2013 ==
The Central Province was replaced by 5 counties in 2013.

Code	County	Former Province	Area (km^{2})	Population Census 2009	Capital
18	Nyandarua	Central	3,107.7	596,268	Ol Kalou
19	Nyeri	Central	2,361.0	693,558	Nyeri
20	Kirinyaga	Central	1,205.4	528,054	Kerugoya / Kutus
21	Murang'a	Central	2,325.8	942,581	Murang'a
22	Kiambu	Central	2,449.2	1,623,282	Kiambu
	Totals		11,449.1	4,383,743	-

== History ==
The province is inhabited by the Kikuyu speaking community almost exclusively. They are part of the Kenya Eastern Bantus.

During Kenya's colonization by the British, much of the province was regarded as part of the 'White Highlands', for the exclusive use of the European community. Therefore, it saw political activity from the local communities who felt that they had an ancestral right to the land. This tension culminated in the 1950s with the Mau Mau rebellion; which saw the region placed under a state of emergency and the arrest of many prominent political leaders.

== Villages and settlements (A-J) ==
- Barigito
- Birithia
- Ceronge
- Chegeini
- Chehe
- Cheronge
- Coryndon Farm
- Dhika
- Difathas
- Dondueni
- Ekaru
- Gacaraigu
- Gacharageini
- Gachatha
- Gachege
- Gachichi
- Gachika
- Gachirero
- Gachocho
- Gachoiri
- Gachugi
- Gachuku
- Gacogu
- Gaichanjiro
- Giakaibii
- Gaikundo
- Gaitega
- Gaithece
- Gakanga
- Gakoe
- Gakoi
- Gakuo
- Gakurue
- Gakurwe
- Gakuyu
- Gatakani
- Gatamayu
- Gatangara
- Gategi
- Gatei
- Gateiguru
- Gathagi
- Gathairu
- Gathaithi
- Gathambi
- Gathanje
- Gathehu
- Gathera
- Gathiga
- Gathigiriri
- Gathima
- Gathinga
- Gathinja
- Gathithina
- Gathoge
- Gathuga
- Gathukiini
- Gathumbi
- Gathundia
- Gathungururu
- Gathuthuma
- Gatiabai
- Gatiani
- Gatiguru
- Gatissa
- Gatithi
- Gatuanibu
- Gatugi
- Gatukuyu
- Gatumbi
- Gatumbiru
- Gatunguru
- Gatura
- Gaturiri
- Gatuto
- Gatuya
- Gatwamba
- Gatwe
- Giathenge
- Gichuru
- Gathalni Farm
- Geitwa
- Gekandu
- Gekondi
- Giachamwengi
- Giachumi
- Giagithu
- Giagatika
- Giaitu
- Giakibii
- Gichagiini
- Gicharani
- Gicheru
- Gichiengo
- Gichira
- Gichocho
- Gichongo
- Gichoto
- Gihigaini
- Gikambura
- Gikaru
- Gikigie
- Gikomora
- Gikunguru
- Gikure
- Gikuu
- Gitathi-ini
- Gitembe
- Gitero
- Githagara
- Githagoya
- Githakwa
- Githamba
- Githambo
- Githanga
- Githerere
- Githerioni
- Githima
- Githioro
- Githoito
- Githiru
- Githugi
- Githumu
- Githunguru
- Githuri
- Gitura
- Githuva
- Gitige
- Gititu
- Gituge
- Gitugu
- Gitumbi
- Gitwamba
- Gitweku
- God's Hill
- Greystone Farm
- Hatha-ini
- Heni Village
- Hithe
- Holmwood Farm
- Huguini
- Huhoini
- Icagiciru
- Ichachiri
- Igikiro
- Ihigaini
- Ihinga
- Ihururu
- Ihua
- Ihuririo
- Ildarakwa
- Ihwagi
- Ikumbi
- Iregi
- Iriguini
- Itaga
- Ithaithi
- Ithanji
- Ithanji
- Ithanji
- Ithekahuno
- Ithenguri
- Itheru
- Ithirameru
- Itiati
- Itundu
- Ituru
- Jeure

== Villages and settlements (K) ==
- Kaagogi
- Kabage
- Kabaru
- Kabebero
- Kabochu
- Kabonge
- Kabuku
- Kabuti
- Kagaa
- Kaganda
- Kagarii
- Kagarumo
- Kagere
- Kagia Farm
- Kagicha
- Kagioini
- Kagira
- Kagondo
- Kagondu
- Kagongo
- Kagonye
- Kagumaini
- Kagundo
- Kagwathi
- Kagwongo
- Kahaini
- Kaharati
- Kaharo
- Kaheho
- Kahiga
- Kahigaini
- Kahithe
- Kahuho
- Kahunguini
- Kahuro
- Kiangararu
- Kairuthi
- Kaitheri
- Kajinga
- Kamando
- Kamandura
- Kamathuri
- Kamatu
- Kambaa
- Kameichiri
- Kamondo
- Kampi ya Njemi
- Kamuchege
- Kamuchoni
- Kamuguga
- Kamuiru
- Kamukabi
- Kamune
- Kamunga
- Kamunyaka
- Kamunyuini
- Kamuyu
- Kamwenja
- Kandegenye
- Kandogo
- Kandongo
- Kangenga
- Kangocho
- Kangoya
- Kangunyi
- Kangure
- Kanjai
- Kanjora
- Kanvenyeni
- Kanyinya
- Kanyongo
- Kanyoni
- Kanyore
- Kanyuira
- Karaine
- Karenge
- Kariguini
- Kariko
- Kariku
- Karinga
- Karingaini
- Karirau
- Kariru
- Kariuwa
- Karugutu
- Karugya
- Karuiro
- Karunga
- Karunge
- Karura Kanyungu
- Karuris
- Karuruma
- Karweti
- Kathukeni
- Kaweru
- Kenyatta Farm
- Kereita
- Keringele
- Kerita
- Kerundu
- Keruri
- Khirgil
- Kiaibabu
- Kiaga
- Kiaguthu
- Kiahiti
- Kiahuria
- Kiamabara
- Kiamaina
- Kiamara
- Kiamariga
- Kiamathambo
- Kiamatogo
- Kiambururu
- Kiambuthia
- Kiamuchege
- Kiamucheru
- Kiamurathe
- Kiamuthambi
- Kiamuturi
- Kiamuya
- Kiamwathi
- Kiamwenja
- Kiamwenji
- Kiamworia
- Kiandongoro
- Kiandu
- Kiandumu
- Kiangai
- Kiangima
- Kiangochi
- Kiangoma
- Kianguenyi
- Kiangunyi
- Kianjege
- Kianjogu
- Kiarakongo
- Kiaria
- Kiaritha
- Kiarutara
- Kiawambogo
- Kiawamurathe
- Kiawamururu
- Kiawambeu
- Kiawanjugu
- Kiawanugu
- Kiawarigi
- Kibanguini
- Kibaya
- Kibiriraini
- Kibogo
- Kibutha
- Kibutio
- Kidono
- Kiganio
- Kigio
- Kigongo
- Kihatha
- Kihoya
- Kihuri
- Kihuyo
- Kiinu
- Kilimaini
- Kimande
- Kimbimbi
- Kimondo
- Kimunye
- Kimunyu
- Kinunga
- Kiranga
- Kirerwa
- Kiriangoro
- Kirimunge
- Kirimaini
- Kirimamwaro
- Kiroe
- Kiriani
- Kirigo
- Kiriko
- Kiriti
- Kirong'e
- Kirogo
- Kirundu
- Kirurumi
- Kisuki
- Kiunya
- Kiuria
- Kiuu
- Kiwegu
- Koimbi
- Komo Farm
- Kuhora Twana
- Kairi

== Villages and settlements (L-Z) ==
- Llewelen
- Lower Gatara
- Magamia Hill Farm
- Maganjo
- Magina
- Magogoni Farm
- Mahigaini
- Mahinga
- Mai Maharo
- Makambuki
- Makindi
- Makwau
- Mararo
- Mariaini
- Mariira
- Marumi
- Marurumo
- Maryvale Farm
- Matandara
- Matha-geni
- Mathareini
- Mathari
- Mathariti
- Mathiga
- Matuguta
- Mbari-ya-hiti
- Mbari-ya-Igi
- Mbauini
- Mbogoro
- Miguta
- Miirini
- Mitubiri Ranch
- Mjini
- Monte Carlo Ranch
- Mrefu Farm
- Mreru
- Mucakuthi
- Mucharage
- Mugeka
- Mugomoini
- Mugueni
- Muirungi
- Mukinduri
- Mukuria
- Mununca
- Mununga
- Murabara
- Murengeti
- Mureru Farm
- Murinduko
- Murundu
- Mururi
- Mururiini
- Mururuwe
- Mutathiini
- Muthinga
- Muthurua Farm
- Muthuthini
- Muuathi
- Muyaka
- Mwathaini
- Mweri
- Mwimuto
- Mwiyogo
- Ndarugu Farm
- Nderi
- Nderitu Farm
- Ndiaini
- Ndiara
- Ndimaini
- Ndindiruku
- Nduma
- Ndundu-ini
- Ndunyu
- Ndunyu Chege
- Ndurarua
- Ndurutu
- Nembu
- Ngababa
- Ngandu
- Ngema Farm
- Ngemwa
- Nginduri
- Ngiriambu
- Ngoriundito
- Nguka
- Ngure
- Niandarawa
- Nitimaini
- Njega
- Njegas
- Njege
- Njigari
- Njiku
- Njora
- Nnundu
- Nyaga
- Nyagachugu
- Nyagatugu
- Nyakahuho
- Nyakahura
- Nyamakuyu
- Nyamindi
- Nyangi Farm
- Nyangiti
- Oldoinyo Lemboro
- Ruiru
- Subego
- Sukari Ranch
- Togonye

Gitugi
