= Kiamariga =

- Kiamariga
- Country: Kenya
- County: Nyeri County

Population (2024)
  - Total: 3,000
- Time zone: UTC+3 (EAT)

Kiamariga is a settlement in Kenya's nyeri County.
