= Kagumo =

- Location within Kenya
- Coordinates: 0.53°S 36.98°E
- Country: Kenya
- County: Kirinyaga County
- Time zone: UTC+3 (EAT)

Kagumo is a small town in Kirinyaga County, Kenya.

== Etymology ==
The word Kagumo is a diminutive term for a Kikuyu word Mugumo (A name of a sacred tree where traditional Kikuyu communities performed sacrifices and worship). The word, therefore, means 'Where a small Mugumo tree grows'. For so long, the place has been surrounded by many Mugumo trees, one of them in the middle of the market. This is the tree that hatched this name. Unfortunately, it was cut down by the urban council due to health problems.

== Mungiki in Kagumo ==
Kagumo in Kirinyaga is the place where villagers, fed up with the extortionist ways of Mungiki, took on the dreaded criminal gang in a bloody war and won. It all started when the sect's followers invaded the county and established bases around Kagumo They raided villages taking away milk, chickens and eggs, and other property from the poor villagers. At the height of the fighting, the vigilantes under the name Kenda Kenda (9-9)Rebellion: who fought the gangs, even had a kangaroo court christened The Hague at a village called Kamuiru 500M from the town. Held under a tree in an open field, Mungiki suspects were tried there and, if found guilty, were slashed to death and their bodies hanged from the tree.

== Kagumo, Kirinyaga County ==
Kagumo is a town in Kirinyaga County approximately 12 km from Karatina town on Karatina Embu road. It's a town famous for agriculture as the main economic activity, specializing in tea, coffee and dairy farming among others.
