= Mageta Island =

Island in Lake Victoria

- Location within Kenya

Geography
- Location: Lake Victoria
- Coordinates: 0°08′S 34°01′E

Administration
- Kenya
- County: Siaya

Additional information
- Time zone: EAT (UTC+3:00)

Mageta Island is an island in Kenya on Lake Victoria.

It is located in the administrative area of Siaya County in the western part of the country, about 470 km west of the capital Nairobi. Tropical rainforest climate prevails in the area.

The average annual temperature on the island is 20°C. The warmest month is March, when the average temperature is 23°C, and the coldest is June, with 19°C. The average annual rainfall is 2 625 millimeters. The driest month is April, with 316 mm of precipitation on average, and the driest is February, with 100 mm of rainfall.

Mageta Island is one of the reference points used to differentiate the border between Kenya and Uganda.

As of March 2016, it was considered that no driven vehicle had been to Mageta Island and that there are no roads there. The island was thought to have been used as a detention camp for those arrested during the Mau Mau uprising. The late Waruru Kanja, a future MP for the Nyeri Town Constituency, was one of those thought to have been incarcerated there.
