= Kandara =

Town in Muranga County, Kenya

Kandara is a town in Muranga County, Kenya. Kandara is located 10 kilometres south of Kigumo and 30 kilometres north of Thika. Kandara hosts a town council with a population of 28,840 (1999 census).

Kandara town council has four civic wards: Gakui/Karimamwaro, Gathugu/Ruchu/Gakarara, Gatundu/Kiiri/Kandara and Kaguthi/Githuya. All of them are part of the Kandara Constituency.

Kandara is the headquarters of Kandara division, an administrative division. Kandara division has a population of 157,454 (1999 census). Kandara division has the following locations: Gaichanjiru, Ithiru, Kagunduini, Muruka and Ruchu.

The 2010 scrapping of administrative structures by passing of new constitution eliminated Maragua and Kandara Districts, merging them into a larger Muranga county.

Kandara town is one of the oldest town in Kenya as it was built during colonial era. The colonialists built it on top of a hill in order to create a good view of "our people"(freedom fighters)approaching it. The current member of parliament is Hon. Chege Njuguna of U.D.A. party. The former was Alice Wahome of Jubilee party . Kandara is an agricultural productive area. It is endowed with coffee and tea plantations. most of the residents engage in small scale horticultural farming. The horticular farming is conducted along the numerous river banks in the area.

Kandara town which is the headquarters of kandara Division, has a history of being oldest. even there is a saying commonly used "old like Kandara Shops on behide". Despite agricultural activities, Kandara has numerous secondary schools. including famous Njiris High School, Ruchu Girls, Ngararia Secondary school. The market day is on Monday and Thursday every week. These are the days when the small scale farmers get an opportunity to sell their produce.

One of the biggest economic challenges facing Kandara, is unproductivity of young generation as they engages in cheap illegal brews.
