= Gikambura =

- Location within Kenya
- Coordinates: 1.28°S 36.63°E
- Country: Kenya
- Province: Kiambu County
- Time zone: UTC+3 (EAT)
- Climate: Cfb

Gikambura is a settlement in Kenya's Kiambu County located in Kikuyu constituency.

== Notable people ==
- Kimani Ichung'wah, politician.

== See also ==
- Satellite Images of Gikambura
- Transportation to Gikambura
