= Mugo wa Kibiru =

Kenyan prophet

Mūgo wa Kībirū or (Cege) wa Kībirū was a Kenyan sage from the Agìkūyū Community who lived in the 18th and early 19th centuries. Mūgo wa Kībirū was born between the 18th and the 19th centuries in Kariara, Murang'a, near Thika. Mūgo wa Kībirū later became known as a healer, or mūndū mūgo (“man of medicine”). His name, meaning “Mūgo, the son of Kībirū,” reflected this role. Although he was not the biological son of Kībirū, he was ceremonially adopted into the Anjiru clan of the Kībirū family.

== Early life ==
Mūgo wa Kībirū, originally named Cege, was discovered as a young boy in the forest by a hunter named Kībirū while checking his traps. When questioned about his origins, Cege is said to have replied that he was “with God, Ngai, Mwene Nyaga” and that he had “come from God.” Kībirū took the child home, entrusted him to his eldest wife, and performed the required rites of purification and adoption, after which the boy became known as Cege wa Kībirū.

During his childhood, before circumcision, Cege tended his father’s goats with other boys. He often wandered alone into the forest without fear of wild animals, later telling his companions that he had been with God, Ngai. As he matured, he began to prophesy, though only fragments of his sayings have been preserved through oral tradition.

== Mūgo's prophesies ==
There are various anecdotes regarding Cege wa Kībirū in Kikuyu folklore, but his claim to fame arose as a result of his accurate prophecies regarding the advent of the Caucasian (white man) on African soil long before British missionaries set their feet in Kenya. Cege's prophecies were that there would come a race of people whose skin complexion would resemble a small pale coloured frog that lives in water (kīengere) and one would be able to see their blood flowing under their skins just like the frog. And these pale strangers would have clothing that resembles butterflies (ciĩuhuruta) in their colourful aspect. And that these pale strangers would carry magical sticks that would produce fire (guns firing bullets), and it will be foolish for our warriors to confront them with their spears Cege also prophesied that there would be a cultural erosion of tribal customs where Kikuyu youth would adopt the ways of the Caucasians. The Caucasians would also carry fire in their pockets (matchboxes). Cooked food previously never sold in Kikuyu custom, would be sold on roadsides and markets all over the country. The plains where the Maasai graze their cattle would be farmed. Cege prophesied the coming of the Uganda Railway line that would stretch from one body of water Indian Ocean in the east to another in the west Lake Victoria and described an iron snake that would have many "legs" like an earthworm (train), travelling on this railway line, eating the Caucasians and vomiting them when it stopped (train journey with passengers). According to the prophecy, the iron snake would have a bushy head bellowing smoke. Cege predicted with astonishing accuracy that there would be a famine in Kikuyuland that would exterminate much of the tribe right before the arrival of these pale colored strangers or foreigners. Caucasians had visited East Africa for Centuries before these so-called prophesies. The Boers had settled, and trekked through various areas, and similarly, the Portuguese had long established trade ties with East Africa. There are also many accounts of Africans travelling to Europe and beyond. There is also no physical, nor historic barrier between the areas in question, and Ethiopia, which has a long and clear history of contacts and ties to Europe.

== The Sacred Tree ==
Cege foretold that the Kikuyus and other tribes would be colonised by the Caucasians but that the colonization would end after many years (68 years) with the result that the Caucasians would leave Kenya. He advised his people to endeavour to learn the virtues of the White men(Caucasians) but keenly reject his vices. Cege predicted that a giant fig tree 15 feet in diameter located in Thika, 26 miles north of Nairobi, would wither and die by the day Kenya gained independence. Cege's prophecies had proved so accurate that the fig tree was regarded as sacred by the Kikuyus; even the British administrators/colonialists took the prophecy very seriously that they tended to and reinforced the fig tree with a mound of earth, and then built an iron ring around it to prevent it from falling. These measures were bound to fail. Shortly before Kenya gained independence from the British, the fig tree was struck by lightning and began to wither rapidly. On 12 December 1963 when Kenya officially became an independent state, the tree had decayed and died thereby fulfilling Cege wa Kībirū prophecy over a century earlier

== Literature ==
Ngũgĩ wa Thiong'o, 1965. The River Between

Cege wa Kībirū appears as a secondary character in "The River Between" as Waiyaki's fore-father:

"Had not Mūgo Kībirū the great seer, in whose line Cege and his son run, talked about the coming of the white man? Mūgo told people that 'You could not cut butterflies with a panga (machete or cutlass).... you could not spear them until you learnt their ways of movement, trap and fight back'"- page 20 -

Mūgo wa Kībirū is mentioned in Ngũgĩ wa Thiong'o's (1967). A Grain of Wheat

"Its (Mau Mau movement) origins can, so the people say, be traced to the day the whiteman came to the country, clutching the book of God in both hands, a magic witness that the whiteman was a messenger from the Lord. His tongue was coated with sugar: his humility was touching. For a time, people ignored the voice of the Gìkūyū seer who once said: there shall come a people with clothes like the butterflies"- page 10 - A Grain of Wheat, Heineman, 1967, 1986, 2002 Heinemann (London); ISBN 978-1-101-58485-9.

"Waiyaki and other warrior-leaders took arms. The iron snake spoken of by Mūgo wa Kībirū was quickly wriggling towards Nairobi for a thorough exploitation of the hinterland"- page 12 - A Grain of Wheat, 1967, 1986, 2002, Heinemann (London); ISBN 978-1-101-58485-9.

Ngũgĩ wa Thiong'o, 2006. Wizard of the Crow

Mugo Wa Kibiru is briefly mentioned by the character Kamĩtĩ.

"He would think of the prophets of old, Confucius, Gautama Buddha, Moses, John the Baptist, Mūgo wa Kībirū, who had all retreated into the wilderness to commune, in total silence, with the law that held the universe together. Were their lives not enhanced by what they had picked up during their pilgrimage?"- page 47 - Wizard of the Crow , Harvill Secker, 2006, (London); ISBN 1-84655-034-3

Mugia, D., 1979. Ũrathi wa Cege wa Kibiru

== Controversy ==
Some scholars cast doubt on these prophecies, claiming that Ccege wa Kĩbirũ must have heard about Caucasians and trains from Kikuyu traders who might have travelled to the coast for trade purposes And it would certainly have been easy to know about guns, clothing, trains and railways from the Arabs and Caucasians with stories from Kikuyu traders reaching the hinterland from the coastal region where many Arabs and Caucasians carried out their trade. The question would then be; how did Cege know that the Uganda Railway would stretch from one body of water to another many years before the railway was laid out? Cege was long dead before the beginning of the railway construction in 1901. Furthermore, what about Cege's accurate prophecies regarding the falling of the giant fig tree signifying end of colonial rule, the great famine in the late 19th century, and the subsequent cultural erosion of African values and customs? Leakey says that trade contacts existed between Arabs and the Kikuyu for a while, and it is possible that these contacts existed only in certain parts of the Kikuyu nation and not everywhere.

Boyes in his accounts testifies that he was the first white man that some Kikuyus in a particular region, saw, and that he was an object of great curiosity. Boyes states that he enjoyed demonstrating his "white powers" by shooting a hole through a soft barked tree with a rifle {Mutaarani, A Kikuyu Reader for Std. IV, 1953, Consolata Catholic Mission Press (Nyeri); Muriuki Godfrey, A History of Kikuyu, 1500-1900, 1974, University of Oxford University Press (London); Father Cagnolo, "The Agìkūyū", 1933, Consolata Catholic Mission (Nyeri)}.

== See also ==
- Kikuyu people
