= Maragua =

Kenyan town

Coordinates: 0°47′0″S 37°7′0″E

Maragua crater’s local house in 2014

Maragua is a town in the Muranga County, Kenya. It was previously the capital of the former Maragua District. The town is located along Thika–Sagana road just 10 km south of Murang'a. In 1999, Maragua town had an urban population of 4,286 and a total population of 27,384.

== Notable people ==
- Norwegian-Kenyan singer Stella Mwangi was born in Maragua.
- British scientist Ellinor Catherine Cunningham van Someren lived on her family's farm in Maragua.
