= Karugutu, Kenya =

Karugutu
- Location within Kenya
- Coordinates: 00°20′44″S 36°20′04″E
- Country: Kenya
- County: Nyandarua County
- Elevation: 2,515 m (8,251 ft)

Population
  - Total: 2,200
- 2018 Estimate
- Time zone: UTC+3 (EAT)

Karugutu is a settlement in Kenya's Nyandarua County.

== Location ==
Karugutu is a village, approximately 21 kilometres (13 mi), by road, south-west of Ol Kalou, the location of the district headquarters. This is 68 kilometres (42 mi), by road, east of Nakuru, the nearest large city. The geographical coordinates of Karugutu, Kenya are 0°20'44.0"S, 36°20'04.0"E (Latitude:-0.345556; Longitude:36.334444).

== Overview ==
The village is in a remote location of Nyandarua County, with a population that is of modest means. The community is water challenged and Water Charity, a California-based 501(c)(3) non-profit was in the process of digging a borehole for the community.

== Population ==
In 2018, the population of Karugutu, Kenya, was estimated at 300 households, with a total population of 2,200.
