= Kigumo =

Village in Muranga County, Kenya

Kigumo is a village in Muranga County, Kenya, 15 kilometres west of Maragua town and 30 kilometres south of Othaya, and 10 kilometers north of the small town of Kandara. Kigumo village is between two other villages, Karega village at the east and Mariira village at the west.

It was part of Muranga District until 1996, when Maragua District was split from Muranga District. Kigumo was made the headquarters of Kigumo division, which is one of four administrative divisions of Maragua District. Kigumo division has the following three locations: Kangari, Kigumo and Kinyona. Kigumo is located within Maragua County Council. Kigumo Division was later made a district with its headquarters at Kigumo town. In 2010, these districts were merged into Muranga County.

== Politics ==
The Kigumo Constituency is one of three electoral constituencies in Maragua District.

== Economy ==
The area's main economic activities are: tea and coffee farming and dairy cattle rearing, among others.

== Notable people ==
Kigumo is the birthplace of John Ngugi.
