= Makuyu =

Village in Muranga County, Kenya

- Location within Kenya
- Coordinates: 0°54′S 37°11′E
- Country: Kenya
- County: Muranga County
- Elevation: 1,394 m (4,573 ft)

Population (2020(Predicted))
  - City: 12,541(Predicted)
  - Urban: 10,241
  - Metro: 2,365
- Time zone: UTC+3 (EAT)

Makuyu

Makuyu or Kenol is a settlement in Kenya's Muranga County and is a city with a metropolitan. And is just at the border of Machakos County at the east, and near Kiambu County at the south.

Makuyu is the home of Don Bosco Makuyu and Kakuzi, the Makuyu Education Initiative, as well as several other NGOs. Whilst Makuyu is much older and has been existence for many years, Kenol town is relatively new. The growth of Kenol town was primarily driven by two factors. 1. The establishment of government offices and 2. The rerouting of the Thika Murang'a road. From a small outskirt dusty town, Kenol has grown by leaps and bounds and is an attractive investment destination by small and mighty. Kenol town is a melting and convergence points for people travelling to Murang'a, Nyeri, Meru, Embu and Isiolo. With the setup of law courts in 2021 and building of a super highway that will extend to Marua, Kenol is bound to experience more growth.

Makuyu was seriously affected by the 2011 East Africa drought.
