= Thika =

- Municipality
- Location within Kenya
- Coordinates: 01°03′S 37°05′E
- Country: Kenya
- County: Kiambu County

Population (2019)
  - Total: 279,429
- Time zone: UTC+3 (EAT)
- Climate: Cwb

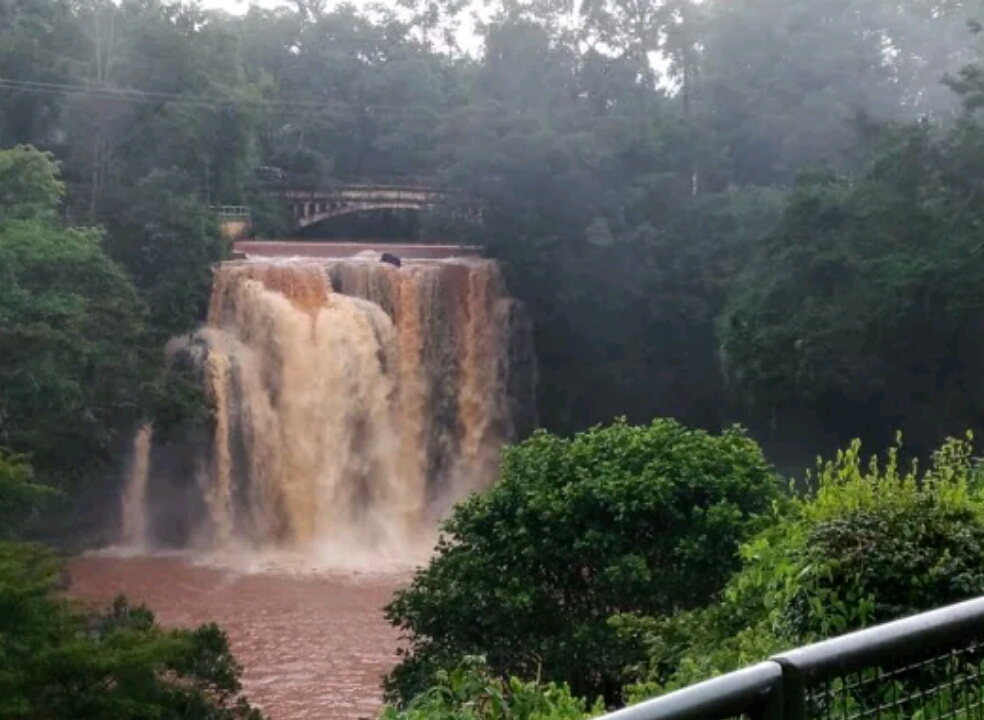
Chania Falls near Thika town

Thika (Gikuyu: [ˈθika]) is an industrial town and commerce hub in Kiambu County, Kenya, lying on the A2 road 42 kilometres (26 mi), northeast of Nairobi, near the confluence of the Thika and Chania Rivers. Although Thika town is administratively in Kiambu County, the greater Thika area comprising residential areas such as Bendor estate, Maporomoko, Thika Greens, Thika Golden Pearl, Bahati Ridge, and Thika Sports Golf Club, among others, are within Murang'a County. Thika had a population of 279,429 as of the 2019 National Census and is growing rapidly. Its elevation is approximately 1,631 metres (5,351 ft).

Thika is home to Chania Falls and Fourteen Falls on the River Athi. Ol Donyo Sabuk National Park lies to the southeast. The town has a railway station with limited passenger service as only cargo trains operate, although there are plans to extend the proposed light rail system to Thika.

The town was the headquarters of Thika West district following the split of the larger Thika district (created in 1994) into five districts: Ruiru, Gatundu, Gatanga, Thika East and Thika West. It was the seat of the South Central regional commissioner (deputy Provincial Commissioner) for Central Province appointed by the then President Mwai Kibaki in 2009 who was in charge of the larger Kiambu, Thika and Murang'a districts. However, under Kenya's new constitution, which recognizes only the 47 districts in existence as at 1992 as semi-autonomous counties, Thika town falls under Kiambu County while some residential areas of Thika are in Murang'a county. Although Kiambu Town is the county headquarters, Thika Town has the largest economy in Kiambu County.

The Flame Trees of Thika (Memories of an African Childhood) is a book by Elspeth Huxley, later adapted for television by Euston Films for Thames Television. It describes the life of English and Scottish settlers in the "White Highlands" during Edwardian times.

== History ==
There are two explanations for the origin of the name Thika. One has it coming from the Kikuyu word Guthika, meaning "to bury". During a great drought, the Maasai people ventured outside of their normal territories looking for water for their huge herds of cattle. Two rivers pass through Kikuyu land, the Thika and the Chania, providing sustenance for the agricultural Kikuyu. With both tribes desperate for survival, they fought a bloody battle that left few survivors. A mound near Blue Posts Hotel supposedly marks where the slain warriors were buried. Thika was also used as a memorial burial site for soldiers who fought in World War II.

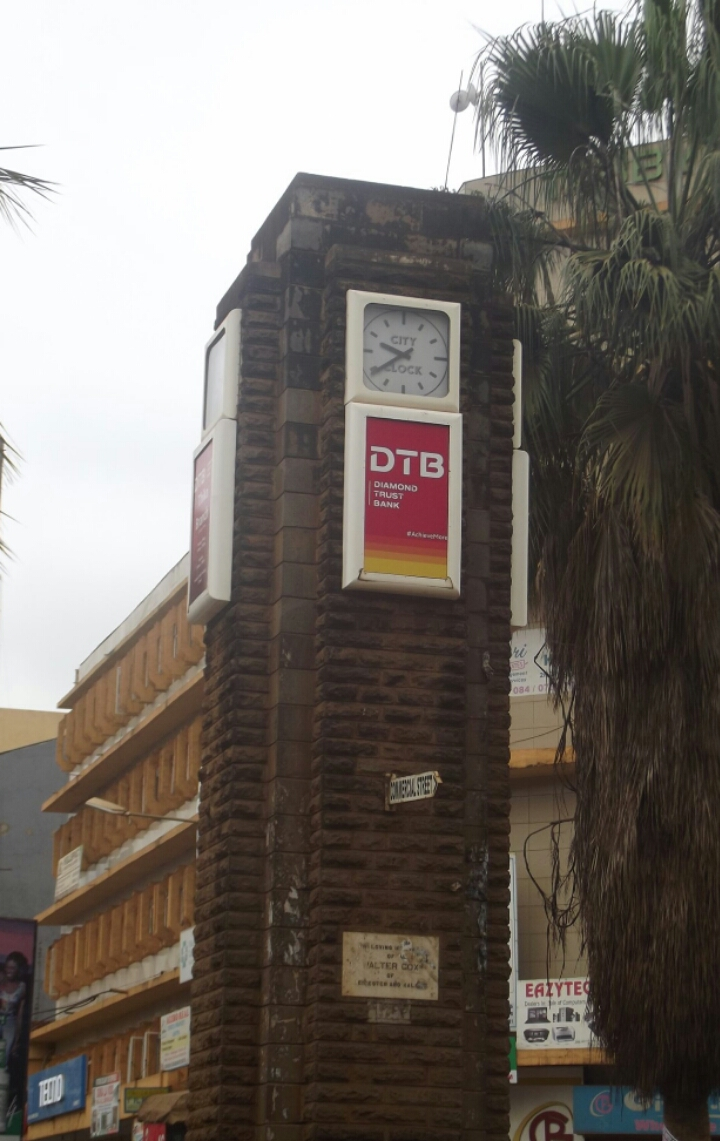
Monument in Thika

The other theory claims it was derived from the Maasai word Sika meaning "rubbing something off an edge".

In addition, the area was inhabited by the Akamba tribe and hence was a border region between three communities.

Towards the end of the 19th century, Europeans and Asians settled Thika, establishing schools, farms, health-care and businesses in the region. A monument in the shape of a pillar was erected by the British in the early 1900s in the central business district of Thika, commemorating the founding of Thika as a town. The town was given its status by the government gazette in 1924. Thereafter it was elevated to a municipality when Kenya gained independence in 1963, and the first mayor was chosen in 1968.

The town has historical sites like the Mugumo Gardens, which is named for the giant fig tree where the ancient legendary seer Mugo wa Kibiro prophesied. Believers claim that all of his prophesies have come to pass. According to legend, the fall of the tree would symbolise the fall of British rule in Kenya. The British government reinforced the tree to prevent it from falling but it split into two parts and fell in two stages in 1963. This land is said to have belonged to the first president, Mzee Jomo Kenyatta.

== Media Stations ==
Thika Town is home to a number of media houses, including radio and TV stations. There are also several print media houses.

=== Chania FM, Kenya ===
Chania FM, Kenya is a media outlet under the parent company, Chania Media Prospects. Founded in 2019, it is part of several other media outlets managed by the parent company and focuses on the larger Kiambu County and other neighboring counties. It is the first radio station in Kenya to be a dedicated country music station.

Gladys Chania, is not to be confused as she is also from this town

== Economic activities ==
Thika is externally serviced by an eight-lane superhighway, a highway to Garissa and the rest of north-east Kenya, a highway to the central highlands and a railway line (with plans to add a passenger light rail to Nairobi). Internally, the town has a well maintained road network.

The main economic activities include agricultural processing, particularly in horticulture and pineapple (exported mainly to Europe), coffee (exports mainly to the United States and Europe), cooking oils (to the rest of Kenya and eastern Africa) and animal feed processing. Other industries include textile (cotton), macadamia nuts, wheat, tannery, motor vehicle assemblies, cigarette manufacturing, bakeries, packaging and industrial chemicals. About 100 small-scale industries and about 50 major factories exist in and around the town. The service sector is well represented with the establishment and growth of a number of educational and financial institutions. Thika is home or close to three universities, tens of middle-level colleges, hundreds of secondary and primary schools and dozens of financial institutions.

Thika has a bustling nightlife with clubs like Blend and The Garage Bar & Grill, modern recreation centers and significant retail trading operations. The growth of the greater Nairobi region and improved infrastructure and services has led to new residential estates.

Campus goers flock to Thika and neighbouring town Juja for a weekend of fun

== Geography ==
Thika is located on a gentle plain before the ascent into the central highlands. Small valleys are on the western and northern edges following the Chania and Thika Rivers that have many waterfalls and meet on the northwestern edge of Thika. Thika is also near Fourteen Falls which is located 65 kilometres (40 mi) northeast of Nairobi off the Thika-Garissa Road. The Fourteen Falls consist of 14 distinct waterfalls on a broad section of the River Athi.

== Climate ==
Thika has a subtropical highland climate (Köppen: Cwb) with sunshine most of the year and an average annual temperature of 19.8 °C. The hottest period is March and April leading to the long rains and the coolest in July. The "long rains" season lasts from March/April to May/June with the "short rains" season running from October to November/December.

== Local government ==
Before the 2010 constitution, the local government consisted of a thirteen-member Municipal Council, with responsibilities for governmental functions delegated to appointed committees. The mayor was chosen from among the elected or nominated councilors for one-year terms. However, with the new constitution, the municipality was abolished. The town is now under the governance of Kiambu County.

The town in 2008 signed a sister city agreement with Dixon, Illinois to create new economic, cultural and social opportunities.

== Education ==
=== Universities and major colleges ===
- Kenya School of Medical Science and Technology - Main Campus - Memorial Hospital
- Experts Business College
- Amboseli Institute
- Cascade Institute of Hospitality
- Chania Boys High School
- Excel Institute of Professionals
- Gretsa University
- Havard Institute of Development Studies
- International Centre of Technology
- Kenya Institute of Management
- Mount Kenya University
- Mary Hill girls school
- Reward Institute of Professional Studies
- Success Professionals Institute
- Thika College of Banking
- Thika Institute of Science and Technology
- Thika Technical Institute
- Kenya School of Medical Science and Technology - Town Campus - 4th Floor above Tuskys Chap Chap
- Thika High School
- Jodan College Of Technology
- Thika School of Medical and Health Sciences
- Thika Institute of Business Studies
- MIPS Technical College

=== Other schools ===
- Joytown Primary School
- Mang'u High School
  - MPesa Foundation Academy
- Thika High School
- Chania Boys High School
- Chania Girls High School
- Gatumaini Primary School
- General Kago Primary School
- Jamhuri Primary School
- Kamenu Primary School
- Kenyatta Primary School
- Kimuchu Primary School High School
- Kimuchu Primary Special Unit Primary
- Madarak Primary School

== Notable people ==
- Catherine Kiguru (born 1987), computer scientist, entrepreneur and corporate executive
- Mohamed Nur Fadal (1885–1949), Somali poet, soldier, and entrepreneur

== See also ==
- Thika Road
- Transport in Kenya

== Sources ==
- knbs.or.ke
