= Ndindi Nyoro =

Kenyan politician

Hon. Ndindi Nyoro
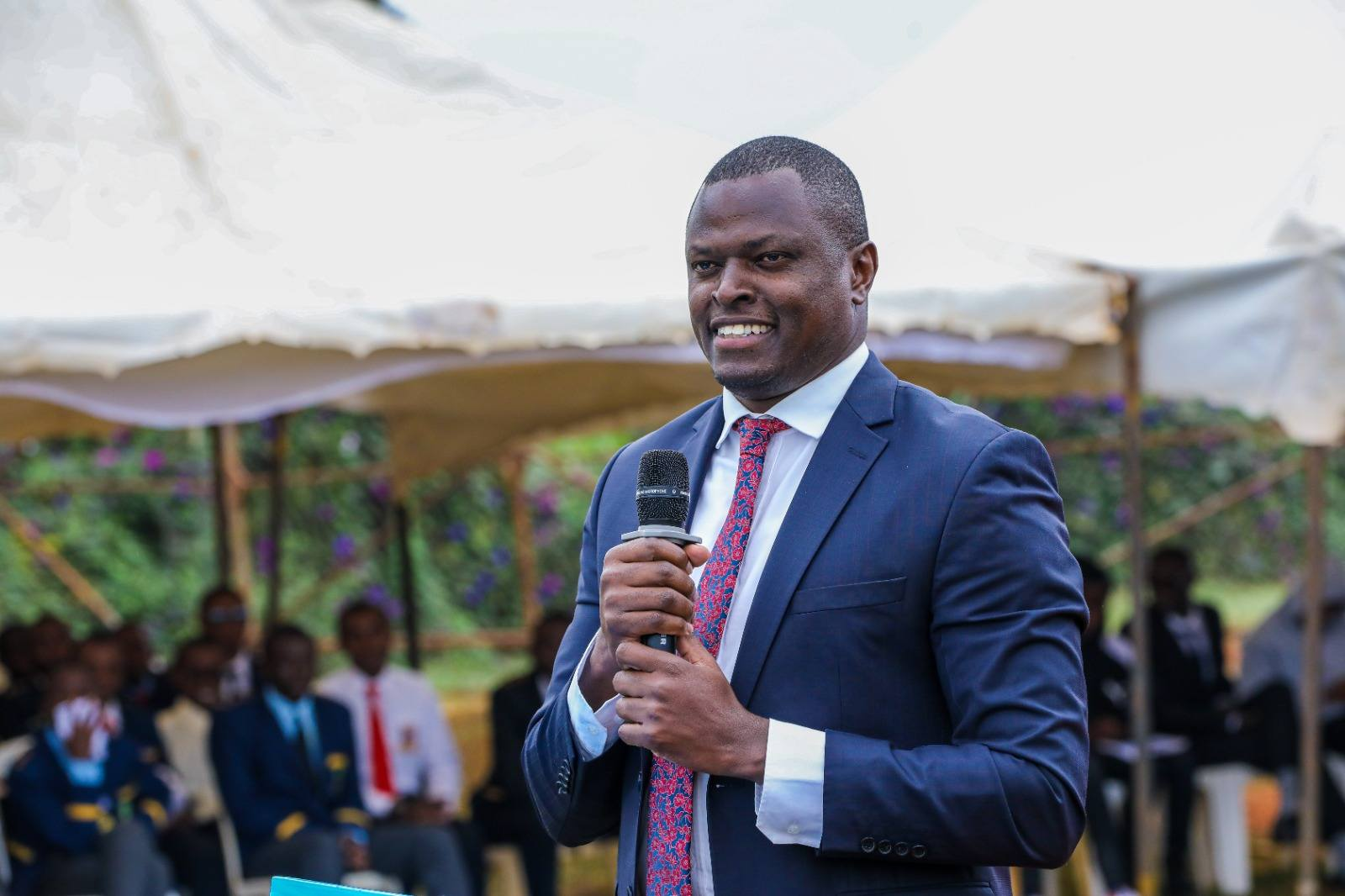
- Ndindi Nyoro in 2026

Member of Parliament
- Incumbent
- Assumed office August 2017
- Preceded by: Irungu Kang'ata
- Constituency: Kiharu

Personal details
- Born: Samson Ndindi Nyoro; 12 December 1985 (age 40) Murang'a District, Central Province, Kenya
- Citizenship: Kenyan
- Spouse: Sophia Wambūi
- Education: Bachelor of Arts (Economics)
- Alma mater: Kenyatta University

Ndindi Nyoro (born 12 December 1985) is a Kenyan politician currently serving as member of parliament (MP) for Kiharu Constituency in Murang'a County. He is also a businessman and entrepreneur. He is the party leader of the People's Party. On 17 August 2026, Nyoro announced his departure from the United Democratic Alliance (UDA) and joined the People's Party and subsequently aligned himself with Kenya's opposition. He is a graduate of Kenyatta University with a Bachelor of Arts (Economics) and was a student leader at the same university. Similarly, he holds two Master’s degrees; a Master of Arts in Economics, and a Master of Economics (Policy and Management) from the University of Nairobi and Kenyatta University respectively, which he pursued concurrently and successfully completed in 2025.

Nyoro has been rated as the best performing Members of Parliament in Kenya, and he is immediate former Chairman of Budget and Appropriations Committee in the National Assembly. During Kenya's 59th Jamhuri Day, he was feted with an honour of Chief of Burning Spear (CBS) for his exemplary development record in his constituency.

Ndindi Nyoro initiated and oversees Masomo Bora education support programme in Kiharu Constituency, which was expanded in 2026 to cover all 65 public day secondary schools, benefiting over 12,000 learners in Grade 10 to Form Four. The programme standardised day secondary school fees at KSh 500 per term, introduced free school feeding programme providing daily meals including Saturdays, and allocated additional funding for revision materials, laboratories, and other learning infrastructure. It also supported enrolment and performance through free uniforms in selected low-enrolment schools, supplementary funding for co-curricular activities, capped remedial tuition charges, and performance-based incentives for teachers and principals, while prohibiting additional school levies and extending coverage to all learners enrolled in day secondary schools within the constituency.

In addition to his role as a Member of Parliament, Nyoro is an entrepreneur with business interests spanning stock brokerage, communications, construction, civil works, and water engineering and drilling. His entrepreneurial journey began during his teenage years in rural Murang’a, where he worked as a cobbler and hawker, before later expanding into larger-scale business ventures.

Nyoro contested the Kiharu Constituency Parliamentary Seat in the 2017 Kenyan general election and was elected Member of Parliament after receiving 60,881 votes, defeating his closest rival who garnered 35,181 votes. His election was notable given the constituency's history of producing prominent national politicians, including Kenneth Matiba. In the 2022 general election, Nyoro was re-elected to the same seat by a large margin, securing 68,256 votes compared to 9,425 votes obtained by his nearest competitor.

Nyoro was a confidante and a key member of President William Ruto's inner circle until he adopted a neutral stance during the impeachment proceedings against Deputy President Rigathi Gachagua. He had been widely regarded as a leading contender for President Ruto’s running mate in 2022 Kenyan general election; however, the position was ultimately awarded to Gachagua. Gachagua later fell out with the President and was impeached in October 2024. On 17 August 2026, Nyoro formally announced that he and his supporters had left UDA and joined the People’s Party of Kenya, where he become the party leader. He also announced that People's Party had joined the opposition ahead of the 2027 general election.

In March 2019, Nyoro introduced the Anti-Corruption and Economic Crimes (Amendment) Bill, 2019 in Parliament. The proposed legislation sought to impose severe penalties for corruption offences, including the death penalty. The bill attracted significant public attention and debate. However, ODM party leader Raila Odinga criticised the proposal, arguing that it was intended to curtail the powers of the Directorate of Criminal Investigations (DCI) and the Directorate of Public Prosecutions (DPP) in the handling of corruption cases. Nyoro rejected these claims, instead attributing the criticism to media misrepresentation of the bill’s intent.

On 8 September 2019, Nyoro was involved in an altercation with then Nominated Member of Parliament Maina Kamanda during a fundraising event in Kiharu. Following the incident, he was sought by police and subsequently arrested on allegations of assault, incitement, and causing a disturbance. His arrest prompted protests and vigils by supporters in Murang’a town, who called for his release and maintained his innocence. Several Members of Parliament allied to then Deputy President William Ruto described the arrest as politically motivated, accusing operatives of President Uhuru Kenyatta’s administration of using state machinery to intimidate and silence political opponents. Nyoro was released the following morning, and all charges against him were unconditionally withdrawn.

Nyoro is married to Sophia Wambūi, with whom he has a daughter. He is the author of a motivational book, How to Succeed in High School.

== Early life and education ==
Nyoro was born in December 1985 in Gathukiini location, Murang'a District (now Murang'a County). His mother was a peasant farmer while his father a small time carpenter in Kiandutu slums in Thika. He is the last born son in a family of four, the other siblings being his sisters. Nyoro enrolled for his primary education at Gathukiini Primary School and when he was in Standard 6, he opened a kiosk at his village to juggle between it and the school, but Nyoro's father dealt it a big blow when he purchased all the stock and ordered Ndìndì to demolish it and focus on his studies. Upon completing his primary education, Nyoro won a slot at Kiaguthu Boys Secondary School, but he could not join the school due to prohibitively high fees. The family thus enrolled him at Kiambugi Boys' Secondary because the school principal was a family friend and could allow for a flexible fee payment plan. Nyoro repaired shoes for his schoolmates at Kiambugi to scrape a living and to add to fee payment. During school holidays, he burnt charcoal and sold second hand clothes to supplement his family's meagre farming income. Nyoro was partly orphaned as his father passed on. He completed his secondary education in 2003 and performed exemplary well in Kenya Certificate of Secondary Education examinations and was the only student in Kiambugi in that year who got a university placement. He had to remain in school and work as a librarian in order to offset fee arrears of $300.

In 2005, Nyoro joined Kenyatta University for a Bachelor of Arts (Economics). To muddle through harsh financial life, he set up a restaurant near the university, but the business performed dismally and he closed it down. He then secured a part-time job as a stockbroker in Nairobi. While a sophomore, he was elected as a student leader in Kenyatta University Student Association where he was the Academic Secretary. Nyoro graduated from Kenyatta University in December 2009.

== Business career ==
Nyoro started Stockbridge Securities while a sophomore at Kenyatta University as he was working part-time for Ngenye Kariuki & Company Stockbrokers. Through apprenticeship by his mentor and the director of the company, Ngenye Kariuki who coincidentally happened to be Kiharu former member of parliament, Nyoro was introduced to the world of stock brokerage. But his start-up lost many business opportunities due to poor internet connection in Thika where one of his offices was located. In 2010, he then started Afrisec Telecoms as an internet service provider, and the firm has metamorphosized into a big entity with huge capital and staff establishment. In 2016, he co-founded a stock brokerage firm, Investax Capital, and due to conflict of interests, he resigned from Stockbridge Securities and receded his shareholding. Investax Capital is the largest stockbroker agency in Kenya with several branches. Later in 2016, he started yet another firm, to deal with construction, civil works, water engineering and drilling. He is regarded one of the most smart investor on shares and stock broking.

== Political career ==
=== Early political career ===
Nyoro’s political career began at Kenyatta University, where he was elected as a student leader in 2006 to represent more than 40,000 students in the University Senate. His involvement in student leadership provided early exposure to governance and public service. In 2013, he was appointed Chairperson of the Kiharu Constituency Development Fund (CDF), a position he served until midway through the term

=== Election as Kiharu Constituency MP ===
In 2017, Nyoro vied for the Kiharu Parliamentary Seat where he trounced eleven competitors to clinch Jubilee Party ticket in the party primaries and thereafter won as the Member of Parliament during the 8 August election by scooping 60,991 votes against his main competitor who garnered 35,181 votes. His win at 31 years as a son of peasant farmer was hailed as a remarkable triumph over the big giants such as Kenneth Matiba, Gikonyo Kiano, Kembi Gitura and Ngenye Kariuki that represented the constituency in the past. In 2022 general election, he was re-elected as member of parliament and won by landslide when he garnered 68,256 votes against his closest competitor who got 9,425 votes.

=== Masomo Bora Education Programme ===
The Masomo Bora programme is an education support initiative implemented in Kiharu Constituency under the leadership of Ndindi Nyoro, aimed at improving access to and quality of public day secondary education. The programme was formally launched in 2024, and expanded in January 2026 to cover all 65 public day secondary schools in the constituency, benefiting over 12,000 learners enrolled in Grade 10, Form Three, and Form Four. Under the 2026 edition, school fees for all day secondary school learners were standardised at KSh 500 per term, effective from the first term of 2026, with schools prohibited from charging any additional registration or miscellaneous fees.

A central component of the programme is a school feeding initiative, under which learners are provided with free lunch on all school days, including Saturdays. Meals consist of githeri and rice served on alternating days, with uji provided during tea breaks, and chapati served for lunch on the last Friday of every month. The feeding programme was introduced to enhance attendance, retention, and learning outcomes, particularly for students from low-income households.

The Masomo Bora programme also provides targeted academic and infrastructure support funded through the Kiharu National Government Constituency Development Fund (NG-CDF). In the 2025/2026 financial year, KSh 10 million was allocated for revision materials, in addition to KSh 20 million provided in previous years. More than KSh 50 million has been allocated for education infrastructure, with emphasis on the construction and upgrading of science laboratories, alongside other learning facilities since the programme’s inception.

To address enrolment challenges, the programme provides free school uniforms to students joining Grade 10 in twenty identified low-enrolment day secondary schools, as well as newly established schools. Each of the 65 day secondary schools also receives an additional KSh 50,000 to supplement co-curricular activities such as music festivals and sports, in recognition of the limitations of regular capitation funding. Further, KSh 900,000 is allocated annually for prize-giving ceremonies, distributed equally between Murang’a East and Kahuro sub-counties, to reward academic performance without imposing costs on parents.

The programme incorporates performance-based incentives for educators and school administrators. The most improved teacher per subject in each sub-county is awarded a fully sponsored educational trip to Mombasa, including recognition for teachers whose participation had previously been delayed due to national examination marking duties. Principals from the best-performing and most improved schools per ward are awarded fully sponsored international study trips, with destinations including Dubai or, for those previously hosted there, Malaysia. These incentives are financed through non-public sources associated with the programme leadership.

Additional provisions under Masomo Bora include the capping of remedial tuition charges at KSh 1,000 per term, payment of insurance premiums and servicing costs for buses owned by day secondary schools, and confirmation that the programme applies to all learners enrolled in public day secondary schools in Kiharu, including students from other parts of Kenya.

=== Controversial Anti-corruption and Economics Crime Amendment Bill, 2019 ===
In March 2019, Nyoro proposed a bill in parliament to have those convicted of corruption in Kenya face stringent punishment, including execution. The bill, Anti-corruption and Economics Crime Amendment Bill 2019, which was mooted against the backdrop of unsuccessful sentence of serious economic crime offenders in Kenya, also sought to have corruption cases handled exclusively by the Ethics and Anti-Corruption Commission. Though his proposals had received general support in and out of National Assembly, the then Orange Democratic Movement (ODM) party leader Raila Odinga termed it as a ploy to disempower Directorate of Criminal Investigations and Directorate of Public Prosecutions from handling corruption cases.

=== 8 September 2019 fundraiser clash and subsequent arrest ===
On 8 September 2019, Nyoro clashed with former Nominated Member of Parliament Maina Kamanda during a fundraising ceremony at Gitui Catholic Church in Kiharu over protocol at the event. An altercation ensued in and outside the church, and the police attempted to arrest him, but angry supporters shielded him away. Later in the evening, Nyoro found himself marooned inside the studios of Royal Media Services where he had attended a show on Inooro TV as contingent of police officers lay in waiting outside. But he left the media house incognito and surfaced the following morning in Kiangage Primary School in Kiharu on a developmental tour, where he castigated the then Interior Principal Secretary (PS) Karanja Kibicho for misusing police to fight him politically. After playing cat and mouse game with the police, a contingent of paramilitary General Service Unit (GSU) officers was deployed and finally arrested Nyoro at ACK St. James Cathedral in Murang'a where he was attending an evening show on Kameme TV alongside two other legislators from Muranga County. He was apprehended and detained in Mūrang'a Police Station on allegations of assaulting police officers, causing disturbance at the church service and resisting arrest during the fundraiser. News of his arrest provoked a storm of protest in Murang'a, and residents poured on the streets at night and lit bonfires, demanding immediate release of the MP. Nyoro was later released from the police custody later in the night and the following morning he appeared in Murang'a Law Court where charges against him were dropped unconditionally. His supporters went wild with jubilation as he vacated the court accompanied by a swarm of political leaders. When addressing a multitude of his supporters in Murang'a, Nyoro echoed words of the former Kiharu MP and multi-party democracy activist Kenneth Matiba of 'let the people decide', in reference to the political stance he had taken of supporting Deputy President William Ruto for 2022 presidency, a stand he said, had caused his political persecution. He said this to the media, "I'm elected by the people and it is to them I owe allegiance. We must be given space to exercise our free will, and people should not be bulldozed to follow certain political direction. These persecutors must never lie to themselves that they can buy off souls and hearts of poor people with their money. This money in the first place belong to the poor peasants and their families. I am ready to pay the price for what my people and I believe in."

=== Team Tangatanga ===
Nyoro distinguished himself as a stalwart supporter and an adherent of then Kenyan Deputy President Dr William Ruto, and a figurehead behind Team Tangatanga – a large faction of Members of Parliament (MPs) that supported William Ruto's 2022 presidential bid. Team Tangatanga (which derived its name from President Uhuru Kenyatta's 'kutangatanga' remark – which means to wander – as he referred to William Ruto's frequent political tours to Uhuru Kenyatta's Mount Kenya backyard) was composed a group of dissenters opposed to Uhuru-Raila Handshake (2018 Peace Agreement between President Uhuru Kenyatta and opposition leader Raila Odinga) due to its aim of blocking William Ruto's presidential bid. Tangatanga had its match in a loose political conglomeration called Team Kieleweke (which means clear or known) that comprised some Members of Parliament drawn from Jubilee Party and a few 2017 general election losers who were opposed to William Ruto's 2022 presidential bid. Nyoro and other Tangatanga allied MPs from the Mount Kenya region bore the brunt for their association with William Ruto. In July 2019, Nyoro wrote on his Facebook page that there were plans to harass and silence MPs affiliated to Deputy President William Ruto and that he himself had been informed reliably of his imminent arrest. He said he would not be intimidated since he has 'lived in houses and situations worse than police cells'.

=== Running Mate Position and William Ruto's Inner Circle ===
Nyoro was a confidante and a key member of President William Ruto's inner circle. During and after the formation of Kenya Kwanza alliance under William Ruto, he had been viewed as a possible running mate to Ruto, but the position was given to Rigathi Gachagua who became Deputy President but later impeached by Parliament in October 2024 following his fallout with the president. Nyoro played a pivotal role in William Ruto's presidential campaign and election as an aggressive mobiliser of his largest ethnic Kikuyu voting block as well as that of youthful Kenyan voting basket. Nyoro was regarded as part of the new power brokers at State House after William Ruto's ascension as Kenya's fifth president. until the impeachment of Rigathi Gachagua as a Deputy President where he opted to snub away. This would strain relations within the ruling Kenya Kwanza Coalition, with some members viewing his rising national profile and political ambition as a threat that needed to be curtailed. Consequently, he was ousted as Chairperson of the influential National Assembly Budget and Appropriations Committee, paving the way for Samuel Atandi, a close ally of opposition leader-turned-government supporter Raila Odinga, to take over.

=== Departure from UDA and Leadership of People's Party ===
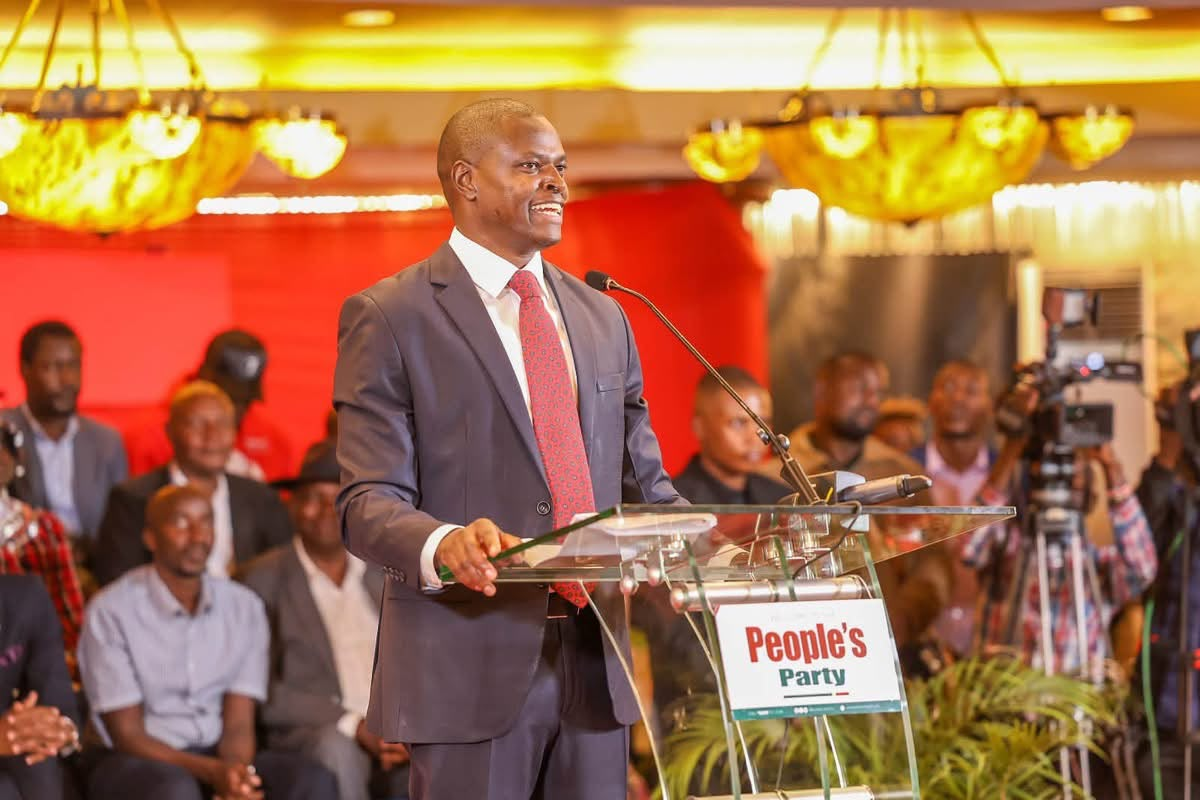
Hon. Ndindi Nyoro speaking after assuming leadership of the People’s Party at the Safari Park Hotel, Nairobi on 17 August 2026.

On 17 August 2026, Ndindi announced his exit from the ruling United Democratic Alliance (UDA) party and joined the People's Party, becoming the party's leader. He stated that he and his supporters had severed ties with UDA, and that People's Party had formally joined Kenya's opposition ahead of the 2027 general election. Nyoro said the decision followed extensive consultations with the several opposition leaders, including the former Deputy President Rigathi Gachagua, Wiper Patriotic Front leader Kalonzo Musyoka, People's Liberation Party leader Martha Karua, former Interior Cabinet Secretary Fred Matiang'i, former Cabinet Secretary and Party of National Unity party leader Peter Munya, and Linda Mwanainchi leaders Siaya Governor James Orengo and Nairobi Senator Edwin Sifuna.

As People's Party leader, Nyoro indicated that the party would cooperate with other opposition parties in developing common political and governance agenda. He also stated that People's Party would welcome opposition politicians seeking elective positions in the 2027 general election and invite prospective candidates to participate in its political activities and nationwide tours. He said his future political engagements would focus on governance, accountability and clearly defined programmes addressing the concerns of ordinary Kenyans.

=== Political and Policy Agenda ===
Following his assumption of People's Party leadership, Nyoro outlined proposals covering education, healthcare, employment, agriculture, public finance, infrastructure, industrialisation, tourism and financial services. He pledged to introduce free basic education, including free secondary education starting from January 2028. He estimated that the programme would require KSh35 billion, including KSh10 billion from the National Government Constituencies Development Fund, KSh10 billion from county governments and KSh15 billion from the national government. According to Nyoro, the funding would cater for about 9,500 senior secondary schools and 3.5 million learners as well as supporting free school feeding programmes.

Nyoro proposed that schools diversify their menus and source food from local farmers, thus providing guaranteed markets for their products. He also proposed the establishment of a national commission, similar to the Teachers Service Commission, to coordinate the employment, payment and management of Early Childhood Development Education teachers. For higher education, he proposed clearing universities’ tax arrears, assisting them to regularise their legal obligations and liabilities, and providing an extra KSh80 billion to increase access to university education.

Regarding health, Nyoro cited that the sector has suffered from inadequate funding, understaffing, political patronage and substandard service delivery. He suggested a government-owned healthcare management system and a Kenya Doctors and Healthcare Workers Commission to oversee the recruitment, deployment and welfare of health workers. He also proposed halving contributions to the National Social Security Fund and reallocating some KSh 40 billion to the healthcare. He argued that the extra money could be used to treat chronic diseases, upgrade hospitals and procure drugs and equipment. Nyoro also proposed tapping into foreign expertise and investment in healthcare, inviting healthcare providers from other countries such as India to set up their operations in Kenya.

On employment, he suggested that each cabinet secretary should be given job creation targets in their ministries and publish reports on the number of jobs created in each ministry every month or quarterly. He identified agriculture, manufacturing and services as the engines of economic growth. He proposed better seeds, cheap fertiliser, increased irrigation, reduced post-harvest losses and more investment in value addition in agriculture. He also suggested shifting from mass production of commodities to specialty tea and coffee, identifying the best crops for different parts of the country, and using diplomatic missions to secure markets for Kenyan produce abroad.

Nyoro raised concerns about the country’s public debt which he said had surpassed KSh13 trillion, and proposed conducting an audit of the debt after the 2027 polls. He proposed cutting on wasteful expenditure, restructuring domestic debt and widen the tax base without increasing the rates. He noted that mining and oil have the potential to boost the economy, but their exploitation should be protected from being monopolised by the politically well-connected. On infrastructure, he proposed to converting 5,000km of low volume roads to all-weather bitumen standard roads with an estimated cost of KSh200 billion. He suggested tapping into existing road, housing and development-related levies for road building and using the National Youth Service and the Kenya Defence Forces to reduce the costs of building. He also supported the use of concrete roads where there is steep terrain and high rainfall.

On industrialisation, Nyoro proposed to make electricity cheaper and ensure stable supply, increase the number of Special Economic Zones and turn the coastal counties into manufacturing hubs to export goods. He cited that Kenya can follow the model of Shenzhen in China, which started as a fishing village and to now a modern city. On tourism, he proposed attracting 10 million tourists every year by boosting advertising, diversifying tourism offerings and simplifying the process of investing. On financial services, he proposed measures to boost Kenyan banks and help them to expand to other African countries, citing KCB Group and Equity Group, as two banks that could develop into pan-African financial giants.

== Personal life ==
Ndìndì is married to Sophia Wambūi, and has one daughter. He always concludes his Facebook and X posts with a hashtag, 'We are African and Africa is our business.'
