= Irungu Kang'ata =

Current Murang'a County Governor

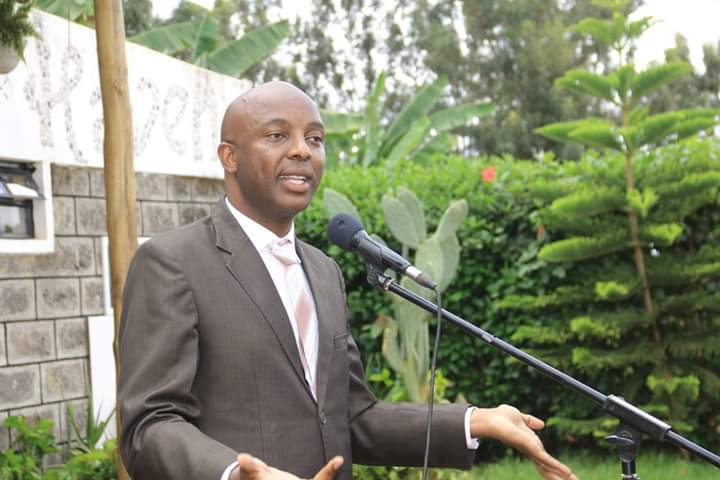

Governor of Murang'a County
- Incumbent
- Assumed office 25 August 2022
- Preceded by: Mwangi wa Iria

Senator of Murang'a County
- In office 31 August 2017 – 25 August 2022
- Preceded by: Kembi Gitura
- Succeeded by: Joe Nyutu

Majority Chief Whip
- In office 2020–2021
- Preceded by: Susan Kihika

Member of Parliament for Kiharu
- In office 28 March 2013 – 31 August 2017
- Preceded by: Barnabas Muturi Mwangi
- Succeeded by: Ndindi Nyoro

Councillor Central Ward of Murang'a
- In office 2002–2007

Personal details
- Born: Francis Irungu Kang'ata; 20 February 1980 (age 46) Kiharu, Murang'a District, Central Province, Kenya
- Party: UDA
- Education: University of Nairobi (LLM); University of Nairobi(LLB); Thika High School
- Profession: Lawyer
- Awards: People's Shujaaz Award; CDF Management Award
- Website: www.irungukangata.co.ke

Francis Irungu Kang'ata (born 20 February 1980) is a Kenyan politician and the current governor of Murang'a County. He is also the former senator of the same county, and the former Senate of Kenya Majority Chief Whip, former member of parliament for Kiharu Constituency and a former Councilor for Central Ward in Murang'a. He is a law graduate from the University of Nairobi and a principal in the firm Irungu Kang'ata & Co. Advocates. He holds PhD in Law from the University of Nairobi and teaches Law at Catholic University of Eastern Africa, Nairobi.

== Early life and education ==
Kang'ata was born in February 1980 in Murang'a, Murang'a District in the Central Province of Kenya. He attended Murang'a Township Primary School (now Vidhu Ramji Primary School) between 1986 and 1993. He was admitted to Thika High School in 1994, where in 1997 he qualified for admission to the University of Nairobi for a Bachelor of Laws (LL.B) degree. He was among the top students. In 1999 at the age of 19, he was elected Vice Chair of Kenya Law Student Society and later in the same year elected the Vice Chairman of entire University students body called SONU. Together with other students, he was suspended in 2000 for two years (but which term turned indefinite after he sued the university) for leading a strike. He rejoined campus in 2003 after the new NARC regime granted amnesty to former suspended students, and graduated in 2005. In 2006, he joined the Kenya School of Law for his diploma in law. He earned a Master of Laws (LL.M) and PhD degrees from University of Nairobi.

== Career ==
Kang'ata runs a law firm called Irungu Kangata & Company Advocates that specializes in corporate law. The firm is located next to the British Embassy at Flamingo Towers, 4th Floor, Upperhill, Nairobi.

In 2002, at the age of 22, Kang'ata made history when he was elected as a Councillor for Central Ward in Mūrang'a Municipal Council. He chaired Mūrang'a Municipal Council Town planning Committee, and he helped recover grabbed public land from powerful persons, including Mūmbi stadium. He represented the council in Mūrang'a District Education Board. In 2007, he was admitted to the bar. After being employed by various advocates, he was employed as a state counsel in the Attorney General's chambers in 2009. He left soon thereafter to establish his law firm.

In 2012, Kang'ata became famous nationally after he defended Rebecca Kerubo, a security guard who was allegedly assaulted by the deputy Chief Justice Nancy Baraza. Following an inquiry, the deputy Chief Justice resigned nine months after the accusations.

In 2013, Kang'ata contested for the Kiharū parliamentary seat on a TNA ticket, which he won after receiving 63,148 votes and defeating nine rivals. The TNA party was later merged with the URP to form the Jubilee Party of Kenya, which was then led by Uhuru Kenyatta and William Ruto, as party leader and deputy party leader respectively.

In 2015, Kang'ata fired three members of the local CDF committee over what he termed as misappropriation of funds meant for bursaries. In February 2016, he called for the overhaul of the Judiciary following claims of bribery and incompetence among judges and magistrates.

In August 2016, Kang'ata filed a petition in the National Assembly accusing KRA enforcement officers of corruption which led to the availability of fake alcoholic drinks in the market. The petition also accused the officers of failing to decentralize enforcement measures to stockists.

In January 2021, Irūngū Kang'ata's law firm was investigated by the Ethics and Anti-Corruption Commission (EACC) for alleged involvement in irregular multi-million payments with Nairobi County Government.

== Awards ==
=== People's Shujaaz Awards ===
In 2015, Kang'ata was nominated for the Mzalendo Trust People's Shujaaz Award, given to lawmakers who championed issues of public interest in both the National Assembly and the Senate. Kang'ata was nominated for sponsoring the Higher Education Loans Board (Amendment) Bill, which was however rejected by the President. The bill would have barred HELB from penalizing debtors who were yet to get jobs and had filed affidavits proving that they were unemployed.

=== CDF Management Award ===
In the same year, Kang'ata was also awarded by Central Kenya Forum for Peace for best management of Constituency Development Fund (CDF) and investing in domestic water projects. The report by the Forum revealed that Kang'ata had invested more than Ksh.42 million.

As Senator, acting on the recommendation of Senate, the President Uhuru Kenyatta awarded him the highest state honour of Chief of Burning Spear. Reasons cited included his public philanthropic causes of medical camps in his home county;his legislative record including introducing Ward Development Fund Bill and his long untainted political career.

(around US$41,000) in the domestic projects.

== Personal life ==
Kang'ata is a strong Christian who champions key Christian causes.

Kang'ata is probably one of the modest politicians in Kenya. He has sometimes claimed that he lives simply, having made investments while working as a lawyer for the future support of his family. He has also been described as Kenya's 'poorest' MP. He attends many political and charitable events, and makes small financial contributions to a number of organizations.

On 9 February 2021, he was de-whipped from his position as the Senate Majority Leader with suspicion that it is as a result of a letter that he wrote to his Jubilee Party leader and President of Kenya, Uhuru Kenyatta that no one from the president's Mount Kenya backyard was interested in the Building Bridges Initiative. The letter that leaked to the media attracted mixed reactions in the political arena. However, the party's Secretary-General, Raphael Tuju has denied Kang'ata's demotion to have been as a result of the protest letter that he had sent to the president. The Building Bridges Initiative is an initiative meant to unify the nation and is a result of a political truce between long-time opposition leader, Raila Odinga and current President Uhuru Kenyatta following their much-celebrated Handshake on 9 March 2018. The handshake came at a time when the political tensions in the country were at its peak after the 2017 General Elections disputed by the opposition culminating into a mock swearing-in of Raila Odinga on 30 January 2018 as the 'People's President.' Kang'ata is now considered to be a victim of the prophecy of fellow Senator and lawyer James Orengo, that the government eats its own children.

== Political career ==
Kang'ata declared his interest for a senatorial position in 2017 general elections. He aimed to unseat the then incumbent Senator Kembi Gitura. This move, however, was considered a contradiction to his stand. For instance, in 2014, surprisingly, Kang'ata was quoted as demanding for scrapping of the senate, claiming that it duplicated National Assembly tasks. He argued that doing away with the Upper House would save the country a lot of money that would then be channeled to development projects. Announcing his bid, Kanga'ata retracted his earlier statement, saying that devolution cannot be realized without the Senate.

In the Jubilee primaries, Kang'ata beat incumbent Kembi Gitura by garnering 158,167 votes. Kembi received 146,207. Kang'ata's win resulted in a bitter exchange of harsh words with his close rival, with each accusing the other of rigging. Gitura claimed that Kang'ata rigged in the primaries and was illegally declared the winner.

Kang'ata was elected the Senator for Murang'a County in the 2017 General Election. Kang'ata garnered 279,285 which translate to 55.11% of the vote cast.

After being sworn, Kang'ata, along with Nairobi's Johnson Sakaja, Kimani Wamatangi (Kiambu) and Nakuru's Susan Kihika applied for Gitura's old Senate Deputy Speaker seat. He served as Senate's Deputy Chief Whip after he was appointed by the majority party to that post. He also served as a temporary speaker in the Senate. In May 2020, Kang'ata replaced Susan Kihika as the Senate Majority Chief Whip of The Jubilee Party. On 9 February 2021, he was removed from that post and replaced by Senator Kimani Wamatangi.

On 9 August 2022, he contested for Murang'a county gubernatorial seat on a UDA ticket and won becoming the second Governor of this county. He succeeded Mwangi wa Iria.

== Governorship (2022 – present) ==
Since assuming office as the Governor of Murang’a County in August 2022, Irungu Kang’ata has prioritized reforms in healthcare, education, infrastructure and public financial management. His administration introduced digital revenue collection systems aimed at sealing revenue leakages and enhancing service delivery across sub-counties.

In 2024, a national survey by research firm InfoTrak ranked Mūrang'a County as the best-performing county in Kenya, giving Kang’ata a 68 percent approval rating, the highest among all 47 county governors. The survey credited his administration with effective project implementation, improved transparency, and citizen engagement.

== Economic Development and Investment ==
Under Governor Kang’ata’s leadership, Mūrang'a County has intensified efforts to attract domestic and international investment. In June 2025, the county government hosted the Mūrang'a Invest 2025 Conference at Thika Greens Golf Resort. The two-day event, themed “Unlocking Mūrang'a as an Industrial Hub,” focused on investment opportunities in agro-processing, healthcare, information technology, manufacturing and recreation. The event drew participation from government agencies, the private sector, and Kenyan diaspora investors.

== Strategic Planning and Governance ==
The Mūrang'a County Integrated Development Plan (CIDP) 2023–2027 and Annual Development Plan (ADP) 2024/2025 highlight Governor Kang’ata’s “proactive leadership” in spearheading key strategic priorities, including the automation of county services, youth empowerment programs, and agricultural value-chain development. These documents outline the county’s roadmap for infrastructure expansion, job creation, and social inclusion over a five-year period.

== Public Statements on Devolution and Governance ==
In September 2025, Kang’ata stated that while devolution remains one of the greatest achievements of Kenya’s 2010 Constitution, counties still face major challenges, including delayed national fund disbursements, corruption, and weak payroll systems. He urged the national government to strengthen accountability structures and ensure timely transfer of devolved funds to boost service delivery. His remarks reflected ongoing national debate about the sustainability and efficiency of devolved governance.
