= John Michuki =

Kenyan politician and businessman

John Njoroge Mìchūki
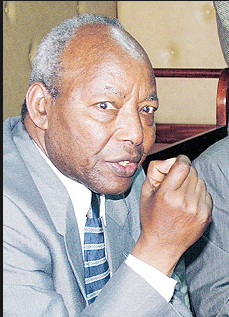
- John Njoroge Michuki

Minister for Environment and National Resources
- In office 9 January 2008 – 21 February 2012
- President: Mwai Kibaki

Personal details
- Born: 1 December 1932 Muguru, Fort Hall, Kenya Colony
- Died: 21 February 2012 (aged 79) Upper Hill, Nairobi, Kenya
- Party: Party of National Unity
- Spouse: Josephine Watiri Michuki
- Education: Worcester College
- Occupation: Politician
- Cabinet: Minister of Environment

John Njoroge Mìchūki (1 December 1932 – 21 February 2012) was a Kenyan politician. He was born at Muguru village in Fort Hall District. He was educated in Kenya and abroad. Michūki emerged as one of the prominent and long-serving civil servants and politicians as well as a businessman in Kenya. Michuki served Kenya in various capacities, including Permanent Secretary in the Finance Ministry, Chairman of the Kenya Commercial Bank, Member of Parliament and Cabinet Minister. He was serving his 4th five-year term as a Member of Parliament for Kangema Constituency. Michuki had a reputation as a "ruthless" and efficient manager, and was widely acknowledged as among the best performing ministers in President Kibaki's Government. He was serving as the Minister for Environment and National Resources at the time of his death.

== Early life ==
Michuki was born in December 1932 at Muguru village, Iyego Location, Kangema Division in modern-day Murang’a County. He was born to a large polygamous family of Chief Michuki wa Kagwi who had 47 wives. Michuki was the first-born son of Mariana Wanjiku, the 45th wife of Chief Michuki Kagwi.

Despite his chiefly parentage, Michuki did not enjoy the privileges of life in his early upbringing. This was largely because his father died on 4 January 1940 when young Michuki was just seven years old. He suffered the fate of large polygamous families, where sons of older wives tend to disinherit those of younger wives. As such, Michuki's mother secured only 3 acres from the large Michuki estate.

In many respects, Michuki's early life was similar to that of many post-colonial African elite who rose to prominence aided by a combination of the social capital and ties of extended family, networks of friends, sheer ingenuity and hard work.

Although he was a self-made man, Michuki attributed his success to his disciplinarian father and a visionary and loving mother Mariana Wanjiku who, despite being illiterate, was keen on giving him education.

== Education ==
Michuki's mother enrolled him at Muguru primary School in 1941, a year after his father's demise. In 1943 young Michuki dropped out of school a result of financial problems to cater for his fees. He travelled to Nairobi where he worked briefly in tailoring-related works where he fixed buttons and made button holes for the uniforms of the Pioneer Corp Unit, during the Second World War. By the time the war ended, Michuki had relocated to Nyeri where he worked in the same job near the old police station, earning 1 Kenya shilling per day. While in Nairobi, he also cooked for the close and distant relatives quarantined by the colonial government as a result suffering from a smallpox epidemic. While here, Michuki enrolled at Kiangunyi Primary School where he sat for and passed his Kenya African Primary Education (KAPE) in 1945.

In 1947 Michuki was admitted to Nyeri High School for his Secondary education, proceeding to Mang'u High School for his Advance Level education. It was while a student at Mang'u High School that Michuki met his lifelong friend, Mwai Kibaki, under whom he later served a senior civil servant and as a cabinet Minister when the latter became the President of the Republic of Kenya in 2002. In 1961, Michuki secured a government scholarship to study at Worcester College, a constituent college of the University of Oxford, United Kingdom where he graduated with a bachelor's degree in economics, Finance and Public Administration.

== Civil Service career ==
Michuki began his long career as civil servant in 1957 when he was recruited as a clerk within the Provincial Administration immediately after graduating from Mang’u High School. Upon graduating from Worcester in 1961, Michuki returned to Kenya becoming the first African District Commissioner (Kenya)|District Commissioner(DC) in Nyeri District. When Kenya re-gained independence in 1963, Michuki joined Kenneth Matiba and Duncan Ndegwa in the youthful team of senior civil servants in Jomo Kenyatta's first Independent Government (1963–1969). His achievements enabled him to quickly rise up the ranks from an Under Secretary in the Treasury in 1963 to Deputy Permanent Secretary in the Treasury in 1964 and Permanent Secretary in the Ministry of Finance in 1965. During his tenure as permanent Secretary, Michuki represented the Kenya Government on the boards of numerous influential international bodies, including being an Alternate Governor for Kenya on the World Bank, the International Development Association (IDA) and International Finance Corporation (IFC). In 1971, he was awarded the Fellow of International Bankers Association (1971 – Washington) for his exemplary stewardship of the Ministry of Finance and later the Kenya Commercial Bank. In 1970, President Jomo Kenyatta appointed Michuki as the Executive Chairman of the Kenya Commercial Bank where he served until 1979. When President Daniel arap Moi succeeded President Jomo Kenyatta as president upon the latter's death in 1978, Michuki became one of the Kikuyu civil servants who left public service to embark on business and political careers.

== Political career ==
Michuki tried his hand in politics when he vied for the Kangema parliamentary seat during the 1979 general election, the first in the Moi era. He, however, lost to the incumbent, Joseph Kamotho.

Michuki made an impressive political come-back in the aftermath of the abortive Coup d’état by elements of the Kenya Air Force that nearly toppled Daniel Moi from power on 1 August 1982 and the political shake-up that followed the "Njonjo Commission of Inquiry" which set the stage for the dramatic fall of the then powerful former Attorney-General and Minister for Constitution Affairs, Charles Njonjo, and many of his allies in 1983. Michuki captured the chairmanship of the then powerful single party, the Kenya African National Union (KANU) in 1983, and dislodged Kamotho from the Kangema seat in the 1983 snap election. President Daniel arap Moi appointed him Assistant Minister for Finance. However, Michuki lost his parliamentary seat and the cabinet post after the controversial ‘Mlolongo’ (queue voting) election in 1988. In the ensuing protest politics after the 1988 massively flawed elections, Michuki covertly supported an emerging group rallied around his Murang’a counterparts, Kenneth Matiba and Charles Rubia, advocating for Kenya's return to multi-party politics. This campaign culminated in the historic Saba Saba uprising that eventually mounted pressure on Moi to repeal of article 2A, that legalized KANU's one-party dictatorship, and Kenya's return to political pluralism in 1991.

=== Multi-party Politics ===
In 1991, Michuki aligned himself to the politics of the original Forum for the Restoration of Democracy (FORD) that emerged from the Saba saba protest politics. Although his friend, Mwai Kibaki, also left the government and formed the more conservative Democratic Party of Kenya in December 1991, Michuki maintained his loyalty to the more populist FORD. Michuki was again forced to choose his political path when the original FORD split into two rival factions: the right-leaning Ford-Asili under Kenneth Matiba and its rival Ford-Kenya led by the left-leaning Jaramogi Oginga Odinga. Michuki threw his support behind Matiba and FORD-Asili.

During the seminal 1992 multiparty elections, Michuki recaptured the Kangema seat on the Ford-Asili ticket. But when Ford-Asili further splintered ahead of the 1997 elections, Michuki decamped to Ford-People and retained his Kangema seat on the party's ticket.

=== Kibaki Era ===
Michuki was at the center of the coalition-making politics ahead of the historic 2002 elections. He first joined a group of parliamentarians led by the then leader of Opposition, Mwai Kibaki, which formed the National Alliance Party of Kenya (NAK), as a merger of smaller opposition parties that endorsed Kibaki as flag-bearer. In October 2002, NAK coalesced with the breakaway faction of KANU, the Liberal Democratic Party (LDP) to form the National Rainbow Coalition (NARC) in 2002, which dislodged Moi and KANU after four decades in power.

Michuki became a central figure and a key Kibaki ally in the NARC politics, retaining his Kangema parliamentary seat. President Kibaki subsequently appointed him Minister of Transport and Communications in the NARC government.

Michuki Rules Michuki's legacy as the Minister for Transport and Communications was the famous "Michuki Rules" aimed at restoring order in public transport, especially the chaotic Matatu (Taxi) sector. The rules which came into effect in February 2004 required all public taxis ("matatus") and buses to install speed governors, passenger safety belts, operate in clearly defined routes, to carry a specified number of passengers and their drivers and conductors to be disciplined and to have a clean security record.

In recognition of his efforts to reform public transport, Michuki won the Kenya National Commission on Human Rights' Waziri (Minister's) award. The defeat of the government sponsored constitution in the 2005 referendum culminated to the cabinet reshuffle which saw Michuki appointed as the Minister of influential ministry Internal Security and Provincial Administration. Michuki was appointed as Minister for Roads and Public Works in the Cabinet named by President Kibaki on 8 January 2008 following the controversial December 2007 presidential election. He would however serve this ministry for a short while as when the Grand Coalition government was formed after a power-sharing agreement between president Kibaki and the leader of the opposition Raila Odinga.

Minister of Environment Michuki was appointed as Minister for the Environment and Mineral Resources in the Grand Coalition Cabinet named on 13 April 2008. He was also appointed by president Kibaki as an Acting Minister of Finance on 11 July 2008 to stand in for Amos Kimunya. Amos Kimunya stepped aside pending investigation on corruption allegation in the Ministry when he censored by parliament over the sale of Grand Regency Hotel and the Safaricom IPO. As Minister for Environment and Mineral Resources, has initiated diverse programmes and projects among them being the Nairobi River's Rehabilitation and Restoration Programme, the reclamation of the Kenya's five water towers (the Mau Forest Complex, Mount Kenya, Aberdare Range, Mount Elgon and Cherangany Hills). He was honoured with a UNEP Award for his clean-up of the Nairobi River and the city. Michuki is the force behind the enactment of a new mining act to regulate environmental degradation and mining. He also took key leadership role in addressing Africa's position towards the 2009 United Nations Climate Change Conference in Copenhagen (December 2009) and served as the co-chair of International Environmental Governance (IEG). Michuki led the Kenya delegation to the Durban Environmental Conference in South Africa on 28 November – 9 December 2011 where he stated Kenya's determination to reduce the menace of global warming and called on the world's wealthy nations to assist the poor ones to mitigate the devastation of climate change. This turned out to be the Minister's last official assignment, having missed the 12th Special Session of the United Nations Environmental Programme (UNEP) Governing Council Global Ministerial Forum held in Nairobi on 20 February 2012.

== Controversies ==
=== 'Shoot-to-Kill' ===
Perhaps the most contentious issue surrounding Michuki is the infamous ‘Shoot-to-kill’ order against the out-lawed Mungiki sect, which he is alleged to have directed the police while he served as the Minister for Internal Security. Human Rights groups condemned the order citing that it contravened both the Police Act and general Human Rights guaranteed by the constitution.

Michuki is alleged to have ordered the raid on the Standard Media Group in February 2006. He sparked more protest when he declared that "when you rattle a snake you must be prepared to be bitten."

=== The 2010 Referendum Politics ===
During the 2010 referendum, Michuki initially took a neutral stand and was reluctant to declare support for the proposed constitution. Michuki was in some instance reported in the media to be opposed to the draft constitution 'dismissing it as a foreign document'. However, Michuki, who had remained mute for the better part of the campaigns, finally broke silence endorsing the draft constitution saying he did not want to "act as a stumbling block to the passage of a new constitution which has eluded Kenyans for over twenty years". He also cited his long friendship with President Mwai Kibaki, who was heading the pro-constitution campaigns.

=== Politics of the Kibaki Succession ===
Amid the opposition from Rift Valley Province MPs, Michuki insisted that all occupants of the Mau Forest would be evicted and only some of the squatters would be compensated. He said it was within his duty as the Environment Minister to protect forests. The Mau forest question is said to be the "most explosive political issue in the politics of the Kibaki succession in the run-up to the August 2010 constitutional referendum and the decisive 2012 elections". Michuki has also received a fair share of condemnation after he endorsed Uhuru Kenyatta as the Kikuyu, Embu and Meru flag bearer ahead of the 2012 elections. His proposition was condemned as "Project Uhuru II" by among Martha Karua who was also a presidential hopeful for 2012 and also comes from the same tribe as Uhuru. Karua was alluding to "Project Uhuru" in 2002 when President Moi threw his weight behind Uhuru Kenyatta for the Presidency when he was retiring.

== Personal life ==
Michuki was married to Josephine Watiri Michuki, and had six children (three sons and three daughters). He was the chairman and majority shareholder of Windsor Golf & Country Club in Nairobi, a club he built after losing the Mlolongo elections of 1988, and which he rightly praised as a great African achievement in recreation and environmental protection. Josephine died on 22 August 2012, almost exactly six months after her husband.

Michuki was also the managing director of Fairview Investments Ltd and Kangema Farmers Ltd, both involved in coffee farms, tea farms and real estate, among other things.

He was an uncle to Queen Jane, a famous musician.

== Death ==
Michuki died at the age of 79 on 21 February 2012, reportedly of a heart attack. Prior to his demise, Michuki had traveled to the United Kingdom for treatment in December 2011, returning to Kenya on 16 February. Two days after his return from London, he fell ill and was rushed to the intensive care unit of Aga Khan University Hospital's Heart and Cancer Centre in Nairobi, where he died. His death was announced by President Mwai Kibaki, who also described the late minister as "a true family friend and dependable ally."

== Legacy ==
He is widely remembered due to the Michuki laws he brought while being the transport minister

== See also ==
- Wanja Michuki
