= Queen Jane =

Queen Jane may refer to:

- Jane Seymour (1507/8–1537), third wife of King Henry VIII of England
- Lady Jane Grey (1537–1554), de facto monarch of England for nine days in 1553
- Queen Jane (musician) (1964/1965–2010), musician from Kenya

== See also ==
- "Queen Jane Approximately", a 1965 song by Bob Dylan
