= Mwangi wa Iria =

Governor of Murang'a County, Kenya

Mwangi Wa Iria

Governor of Murang'a County
- In office 4 March 2013 – August 2022
- Deputy: James Kamau Maina
- Succeeded by: Irungu Kang'ata

Personal details
- Born: Wa Iria Mwangi; 28 August 1968 (age 57) Kiboi village, Kiharu Constituency Murang'a County
- Party: Usawa Kwa Wote
- Spouse: Jane Wa Iria
- Children: 3
- Education: Moi University

H.E. Hon. Mwangi Wa Iria (born 28 August 1969) is the party leader of Usawa Kwa Wote Party and the immediate Former Governor of Murang'a County in Kenya. He is also the former Vice chairman of the Council of Governors of Kenya, having been elected in January 2019. He was elected on 4 March 2013 and subsequently in August 2017 for his second term. His famous campaign slogan is "Hapa kazi tu" (translated from the native Kikuyu language, no wira tu). He won the 2013 Kenyan gubernatorial elections under The National Alliance ticket and the 2017 elections under the Jubilee Party ticket.

== Education ==
Wa Iria attended Kiboi Primary School and later Weithaga Boys High School. He is also an alumnus of Moi University and received training from the Chartered Institute of Procurement & Supply in the United Kingdom.

== Career ==
Before joining politics, Wa Iria was the Managing Director of New Kenya Cooperative Creameries (KCC). He has also served as National Sales Manager of Kenya Breweries Ltd, Managing Director of Ngano Feeds Ltd, CEO of Freshco Seeds and as General Manager of the Commercial Division of Industrial Promotion Services that brings together more than 30 companies owned by the Aga Khan Development Network.
