= Peter Kagwanja =

Kenyan intellectual

Prof. Peter Kagwanja
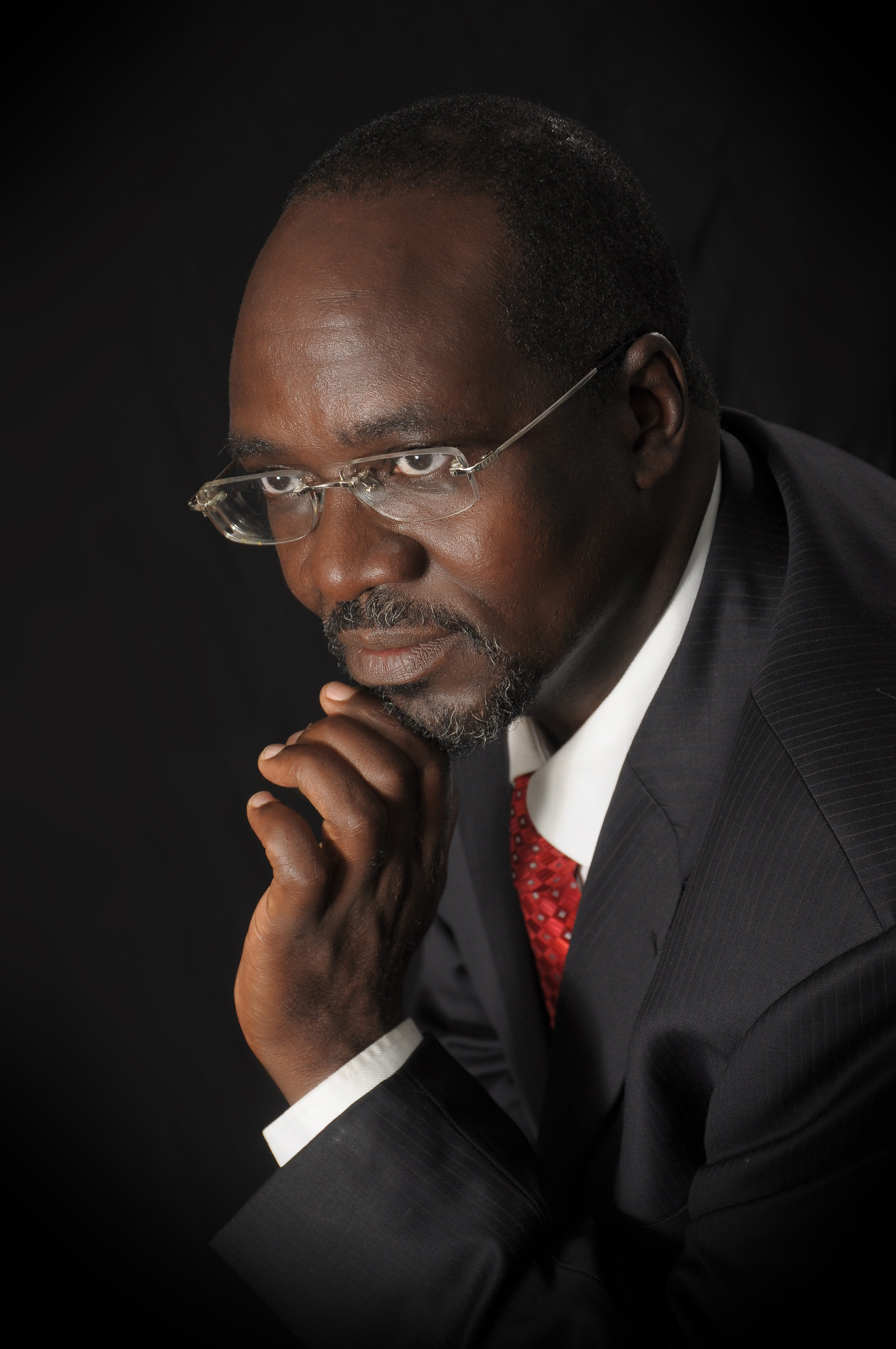
- Peter Kagwanja
- Born: Peter Mwangi Kagwanja; 8 August 1963 (age 63); Murang'a, Kenya
- Education: Kenyatta University (BEds & MA); University of Illinois at Urbana-Champaign (PhD)
- Occupations: Political Scientist, commentator, author
- Website: www.peterkagwanja.com

Peter Kagwanja (born August 8, 1963, in Murang’a County, Central Kenya) is a Kenyan intellectual, adviser, reform strategist and policy thinker on governance, security and African affairs. From the early 1990s, Kagwanja was associated with Kenya's pro-democracy movement through his research and writings in the media, and was one of the founders of the University Academic Staff Union (UASU). As an emigre in South Africa (2003-2008), he was in the team of experts that provided technical backing to the intense policy processes that led to the creation of the African Union (AU) and its peace and security architecture. When Kenya's opposition ascended to power, Kagwanja became part of the technical team that re-engineered and realigned the country's foreign policy and strategy to the challenges of the 21st century. He became government adviser on the post-2008 reform agenda and strategy; managed its successful campaign for the New Constitution of Kenya and provided strategic thinking towards the transition to the post-Kibaki order. Kagwanja is a public intellectual who has authored many articles and books, including Kenya's Uncertain Democracy: The Electoral Crisis of 2008 London: Routledge (2010).

== Early life and education ==
Peter Kagwanja was born on August 8, 1963, in Kenyanjeru village, Rwathia location of Kangema Division, Murang’a County in central Kenya. His parents moved to Maragua town, 89 kilometers North of Nairobi, where he attended Kianjiru-ini Primary School before proceeding to Kirogo Secondary School and Kangaru High School. Kagwanja received a Bachelor of Education Degree (in History, politics and philosophy) and a Master of Arts degree from Kenyatta University. His Master's thesis, which won a grant from the Council for the Development of Social Research in Africa (CODESRIA), examined the role of pan-African trade union movement in Kenya's freedom struggle. Kagwanja won the Fulbright Fellowship to study at the University of Illinois at Urbana-Champaign, where he obtained a doctorate degree, specializing in history, politics and international law.

== Academic career ==
Kagwanja started his academic career as a Graduate Assistant at the Department of History and Government, Kenyatta University in the 1989-1991 hiatus. Between 1992 and 1998, he lectured in history and political science at Moi University where he also served as a researcher with the university's Center for Refugee Studies. While here, he became a founding member of the University Academic Staff Union (UASU) in 1993 and also served as the Secretary-General of the Historical Association of Kenya (1994-1998) under the chairmanship of the renowned Kenyan historian, Professor Bethwell Allan Ogot. In 2002-2003, Kagwanja served as a fellow at the Center for African Studies at the University of Illinois at Urbana-Champaign where he also helped in teaching World Civilization and Modern African history. Upon completing his PhD in 2003, Kagwanja was offered a teaching position as assistant professor at the Department of History at Illinois. He, however, moved to South Africa, where he worked with various research and policy think tanks and universities. Kagwanja served as research associate at the Department of Political Science, University of Pretoria (2004-2008). He also served as a visiting professor of African diplomacy at the Department of Political and International Studies, Rhodes University, South Africa (2008–2010) and external examiner with the University of the Witwatersrand, Johannesburg. He was also a regular visiting lecturer at the South African National Defence College (SANDC) in Pretoria. Meanwhile, between 2002 and 2008, he was a regular visiting scholar at Oxford University (UK), the African Studies Center at the University of Leiden, the Netherlands (2002), Center for African Studies at Uppsala, Sweden and a researcher with the Center on International Cooperation, University of New York, on a multinational project on Regional Conflict Formations. Kagwanja has been regularly involved in the programmes of the United States' National Defence University (NDU), through its African Center for Strategic Studies (ACSS), including "Improving Peacekeeping in Africa" (2013) and the Multinational Working Group on "Water and Security in Africa" . Since 2014, he has taught and supervised masters and doctoral projects at the Institute of Diplomacy and International Studies at the University of Nairobi and the National Defence College, Kenya.

== Pro-democracy activism ==
In 1991, as Kenya's pro-democracy movement gathered momentum, Kagwanja was associated with the radical activism of the intellectual wing of “Young Turks”^{[12]} which included Gitobu Imanyara, Peter Anyang Nyong'o, Paul Muite, James Orengo, Kiraitu Murungi, Willy Mutunga, Githu Muigai, among others. As a university student and later lecturer, Kagwanja published political articles in the Daily Nation, Society, Financial Review and the Nairobi Law Monthly, whose then Editor-in-Chief, Gitobu Imanyara, became an authoritative voice for democratic change. In April 1993, Kagwanja was a founding member University Academic Staff Union (UASU) and Moi University's representative in its National Committee. UASU was the successor to the University Staff Union (USU) that was proscribed in 1979. Following UASU's 1993-1994 nationwide strike by lecturers from Kenya's public universities, Kagwanja was sacked as lecturer in November 1993 together with other UASU leaders, including Korwa Adar (Chairman) and Kilemi Mwiria (Secretary General).

=== Intellectual activism ===
Intense government clampdown on UASU in the universities pushed Kagwanja and other academics deeper into intellectual activism within the aegis of Africa's nascent civil society and think tanks. He became deeply involved in the activities of the Kenya Human Rights Commission (KHRC), the Historical Association of Kenya and the Council for the Development of Economic and Social Research in Africa (CODESRIA). Within these intellectual spaces, Kagwanja contributed to scholarship on political violence, nationalism, identity politics, democracy, globalization and citizenship in Africa.

== Research and scholarship ==
In 1996-2002, Kagwanja was a research associate with the Kenya Human Rights Commission (KHRC), working under Dr Willy Mutunga, where he undertook fact-finding missions to the flashpoints of political violence and published seminal reports such as Killing the Vote and Raiding Democracy. As an émigré in South Africa (2003-2008), Kagwanja was senior researcher at Safer Africa, a Pretoria-based think tank centrally involved in the processes that led to the establishment of the African Union Peace and Security Architecture. He became the Director of the International Crisis Group's Southern Africa Project (2004-2007). In 2007 Kagwanja joined the Human Science Research Council South Africa (HSRC) as Research Director at the Democracy and Governance Programme. He soon after became Executive Director, replacing Professor Adam Habib who moved to the University of Johannesburg as deputy vice chancellor. He also became the Chief editor of HSRC's flagship publication, including the State of the Nation Series, earlier on edited by Professor Roger Southall, who also served as Executive Director at the Democracy and Governance Programme. Kagwanja also started the Africa in Focus series, a publication of HSRC dedicated to key developments in Africa.

Kagwanja collaborated with other pan-African Intellectuals to found the Africa Policy Institute (API). In 2008, Kagwanja helped establish the Kenya Institute of Governance and served as its Council Member. Kagwanja also served in the advisory board of flagship journals on African affairs, including the Journal of African Elections and African Affairs. Between 2003 and 2007, Kagwanja was part of experts from Africa who provided technical support to the intense policy processes which led to the transformation of the Organization of African Unity (OAU) to the African Union (AU) and its various organs, including the New Partnership for Africa's Development (NEPAD). He has continued to provide research and technical support to the African Union and its Regional Economic Communities on issues of governance, peace and security. In 2006-2011, he was part of a team of experts assembled by the Common Market for Eastern and Southern Africa (COMESA) to work on its "War Economy Project" and to formulate its Conflict Prevention, Management and Resolution Strategy. He was also involved in research and policy dialogues on the Implementation of the UN Global Counter-terrorism Strategy in Africa.

== Notable arguments ==
=== Youth and generational politics ===
Kagwanja is better known for his work on youth and generational politics published as a series of articles and book chapters between 2003 and 2007. His research highlights the transformation of the Mungiki youth group from a social movement that emerged in the 1980s in the pristine rural parts of Kenya as part of the larger national resistance against one-party authoritarianism to a stridently violent extremist and criminal gang upon its entry into the urban milieu. In a 2006 article, "Power to Uhuru", Kagwanja argued that Mungiki popularized a brand of generational politics based on Gikuyu traditional system of power transfer across generations known as itwika as an idiom of resistance, pushing for a change of guard from the old political class to the ‘Uhuru' (independence) generation. Mungiki’s generation politics failed to deliver power to the youth during the 2002 General Elections, forcing some of its elements to turn to violent extremist strategies. Mungiki reportedly featured in the 2008 post-election violence, but Kagwanja argues that in the context of the diffused violence in the post-Moi era, Mungiki had come to refer more to ‘Kikuyu’ youth in the margins of political and economic power than to a known cohesive youth movement with an organizational structure and chain of command. In September 2011, during the confirmation of charges hearings at the Hague-based International criminal Court (ICC), the court's chief Prosecutor, Luis Moreno Ocampo, invoked one of Kagwanja's articles to draw a link between Uhuru Kenyatta and the Mungiki. In a press statement on September 29, 2011, Kagwanja dismissed the Prosecutor's use of his research as unethical, predatory and careless.

=== Kenya's 2008 Crisis: Courts or Chaos? ===
On January 25, 2008, Kagwanja published a widely read report titled "Breaking Kenya's Impasse: Chaos or Courts?", which called on parties in the 2008 post-election violence to return to the courts to avert the crisis. "What Kenya urgently needs is a chance for its courts to pronounce themselves on the way forward", he said. Kagwanja called on the government and the ruling Party of National Unity (PNU) to consider inviting neutral judges from other commonwealth countries to provide the necessary neutrality and restore the confidence of the parties to the dispute in the courts. Through the mediation efforts of the African Union Panel of Eminent African Personalities chaired by former UN Secretary General, Kofi Annan, rival parties signed the National Accord and Reconciliation Act in April 2008, ending the crisis. In 2010, Kagwanja analyzed the state of Kenya's stability in a co-edited book titled: Kenya's Uncertain Democracy: The Electoral Crisis of 2008, where he argued that although a power-sharing deal between President Mwai Kibaki and Opposition leader, Raila Odinga seemed to be holding, post-bellum Kenya had increasingly become part of the worlds’ growing number of democracies at-risk.

== Government adviser ==
=== Foreign policy reforms ===
In 2004-2005, Kagwanja was part of a team of experts working through the Kenyan Mission in South Africa, which generated thinking on Kenya's engagement strategy with South Sudan. In 2005-2008, he joined a team of officials and experts within the Ministry of Foreign Affairs that drafted Kenya's first-ever official foreign policy document and strategy and helped establish the Foreign Service Institute (FSI) of the Ministry. In 2007 and 2008, he helped in inducting newly appointed ambassadors and train the first cadre of young cadets who joined Kenya's expanding diplomatic corps.

=== Role in the New Constitution ===
In November 2007, while still in South Africa, Kagwanja joined the strategy team of the Party of National Unity (PNU). In August 2008, after the signing of the National Accord and reconciliation Act and introduction of a power-sharing government, Kagwanja joined the Government of President Mwai Kibaki as adviser on governance and strategy. After the Committee of Experts on Constitution Review (CoE) released the controversial Constitution of Kenya Draft on 17 November 2009, Kagwanja was part of the Government team that negotiated for the new constitution. He wrote extensively, calling for one center of executive power rather than the two (President and Prime Minister) that characterized the power-sharing regime and arguing for an American-style presidential system with strong checks and balances along Montesquieu's doctrine of separation of power between the various arms of government. On devolution, Kagwanja proposed a two-tiered government based on the idea of 'developmental devolution.’ This thinking was largely inspired by Amartya Kumar Sen’s thesis: development as freedom, that stresses the transfer of resources to devolved structures as a bottom-up strategy of empowering the grassroots.

Building up on an earlier article co-authored with Willy Mutunga, on 23 January 2010, Kagwanja wrote a strong defense of developmental devolution as an alternative to divisive Kenya-style ethnic federalism (Majimboism) widely blamed for the tribal violence in parts of the country. In January 2010, Kagwanja headed the PNU think tank that provided technical backing to the Government negotiators during the watershed constitutional retreat by the Parliamentary Select Committee (PSC) in the lakeside town of Naivasha. Kenya abandoned the parliamentary system inherited from Britain in 1963 and adopted an American-style pure presidential system of government checked by a two-chamber parliament, a reformed judiciary and a devolved government consisting of 47 counties. On 11 May 2010, after consultation with Prime Minister Raila Odinga, President Kibaki appointed Kagwanja as a Co-director of the Joint National Secretariat of the Grand Coalition Government that manage the campaign for Kenya's new constitution during the August 4, 2010 Referendum. After winning nearly 70% of the popular vote, the Constitution was promulgated on 27 August 2010. This ushered in Kenya's Second Republic.

== Published media ==
Since 2013, Kagwanja has published a regular column with the Sunday Nation on a plethora of issues. He also contributes analytic reports to the East African. His media articles on the constitutional debate in 2009-2010 are published as Kenya's Quiet Revolution: The Making of the New Constitution (2016). Media articles published in the 2013-2014 period were compiled into a book titled: Eye on the Nation, Kenya 2014: Trials and Triumph of Democracy (2015). In addition to his written work, Kagwanja regularly provides analysis on topical issues to the BBC, CNN, VoA, Al-Jazeera, and South African Broadcasting Corporation (SABC), CCTV, Citizen TV and Nation TV.

=== Selected works ===
- Kagwanja, Peter, Kenya's Quiet Revolution: The Making of the New Constitution, Nairobi: Tafiti House Publishers, 2016
- Kagwanja, Peter (2015), Eye on the Nation, Kenya 2014: Trials and Triumphs of Democracy. Nairobi: Tafiti House Publishers, 2015.
- Kagwanja, Peter (2012). Kiraitu Murungi: An Odyssey in Kenyan Politics Nairobi: East African Education Publishers.
- Kagwanja, Peter (2010). "Courting Genocide: Populism and the Informalization of Violence in Kenya’s 2008 Crisis," in Kenya's Uncertain Democracy: The Electoral Crisis of 2008 Crisis, London: Routledge.
- Kagwanja, P., Southall, R., (eds.) (2010). Kenya's Uncertain Democracy: The Electoral Crisis of 2008 London: Routledge
- Kagwanja, P., Kondlo, K., (eds.) (2009). State of the Nation: South Africa 2008, Cape Town: HSRC Press, co-edited with (paperback, ISBN 0-7969-2199-7,
- Kagwanja, Peter (2009). South Africa in Africa: Capacity Overstretch and the Limits of a Regional Power, Cape Town: HSRC Press.
- Kagwanja, Peter (2009). "Cry Sovereignty: South Africa in the UN Security Council one Year on". State of the Nation: South Africa, Cape Town: HSRC Press.
- Kagwanja, Peter (2008). "Protracted Exile: Somali Refugees in the Horn of Africa", in (eds.) Gil Loescher and Edward Newman, Protected Refugee Situations, (Oxford University Press).
- Kagwanja, Peter (2007). "Calming the Waters: The East African Community and Conflict over the Nile Resources" Journal of Eastern African Studies, Vol.1, No.3, November 2007, pp. 321–337.
- Kagwanja, Peter (2006). "Power and Peace: South Africa and the Refurbishing of Africa’s Multilateral Capacity for Peacemaking," in Roger Southall (ed.) South Africa’s Role in Conflict Resolution and Peacemaking, Cape Town: Human Science Research Council.
- Kagwanja, Peter (2006). " Counter-Terrorism in the Horn of Africa: New Security Frontiers, Old Strategies”, African Security Review, Vol. 15 No. 3 September 2006, pp.72–86.
- Kagwanja, Peter (2006). "Power and Peace: South Africa and the Refurbishing of Africa’s Multilateral Capacity for Peacemaking" Journal of Contemporary African Studies, Vol. 24 No. 2
- Kagwanja, Peter (2006). "Power to Uhuru: Youth Identity and Generational Politics in Kenya’s 2002 Elections," African Affairs, 105, 418, pp.51–75.
- Kagwanja, Peter (2005). "Zimbabwe’s March 2005 Elections: Dangers and Opportunities," African Security Review, Vol. 14 No. 3.
- Kagwanja, Peter (2004). ‘The clash of Generations? Youth Identity, Ethnic Violence and the Politics of Moi Succession, 1991-2002,’in Abbink, J.andvan Kessel, W., (eds.) Vanguard or Vandals? Youth, Politics and Conflict in Africa, (Brill Academic Publishers, Leiden.
- Juma, M., Kagwanja, P., (2003). "Securing Refuge from Terror: Refugee Protection in East Africa After September 11," in Nicklaus Steiner, Mark Gibney, and Gil Loescher, (eds.) Problems of Protection: The UNHCR, Refugees, and Human Rights, New York & London: Routledge.
- Kagwanja, Peter (2003). "Globalizing Ethnicity, Localizing Citizenship: Globalization, Identity Politics and Violence in Kenya’s Tana River Region," Africa Development, Vol. XXVIII, No. 1 & 2.pp112-152.
- Kagwanja, Peter (2003). "Facing Mount Kenya or Facing Mecca? The Mungiki, Ethnic Violence and the Politics of the Moi Succession in Kenya, 1987-2002," African Affairs,102. pp. 25-49.
- Kagwanja, Peter (2002). "Strengthening Local Relief Capacity in Kenya: Challenges and Prospects," in Eroding Local Capacity: International Humanitarian Action in Africa, (eds.) Monica Kathina Juma and Astri Suhrke, Uppsala: The Nordic African Institute.
- Kagwanja, Peter (2002). "Le Bon Samaritan a L’Epreuve de la ‘Tradition Africaine’ Dans Le Camps de Refugies au Kenya." in Politique Africaine, N0. 85, Mars.
- Kagwanja, Peter (2001). Raiding Democracy: The Slaughter of the Marakwet in Kerio Valley. Nairobi. Kenya Human Rights Commission.
- Kagwanja, Peter (1998). Killing the Vote: State-Sponsored Violence and Flawed Elections in Kenya. Nairobi. Kenya Human Rights Commission.
