= Camellia (company) =

British-owned group of agricultural companies

Camellia Plc
- Type: Corporate group, Public limited company
- Traded as: LSE: CAM
- Industry: Agriculture
- Founded: 15 August 1889; 137 years ago
- Headquarters: Linton, Kent, United Kingdom
- Area served: International
- Number of employees: 78,000+
- Website: camellia.plc.uk

Camellia Plc is an agricultural group of companies, incorporated as a public limited company, with seat in Linton, Kent in the United Kingdom. Camellia produces core crops like macadamia, avocados and tea and specialty crops like wine grapes and blueberries. The company has over 78,000 employees.

== History ==
Camellia has historical roots in Kolkata, Malawi and Kenya. The Camellia name was first used in 1964.

In June 2020, 85 people living at and near a plantation operated by Camellia's Kenyan subsidiary Kakuzi took Camellia to court in London. The claimants alleged human rights abuses by Kakuzi security guards including murder, rape, violent attacks and unlawful detainments. The Kenya Human Rights Commission, the Centre for Research on Multinational Corporations and Ndula Resource Center supported the claimants. The case was settled in February 2021, for a sum of £4.6 million. At the same time, Camellia settled similar allegations against its Malawian subsidiary Eastern Produce Malawi for a sum of £2.3 million.
