= Peoples Party of Kenya =

Political party in Kenya

- Abbreviation: PPK
- Leader: Ndindi Nyoro
- Chairman: Mark Odhiambo
- Secretary-General: BennyHinn Walubengo
- Founded: 1996
- Headquarters: Witeithie House, 4th Floor, Room 413 Thika, Kiambu County
- National Assembly: 1 / 349
- )Senate: 0 / 67

Website
- ppk.co.ke

The People's Party of Kenya (PPK) is a political party in Kenya.

== History ==
Established in 1996, the PPK nominated seven National Assembly candidates for the 2007 general elections. Although it received only 0.15% of the national vote, it won a single seat,

Despite nominating 12 National Assembly candidates for the 2013 elections and increasing its vote share to 0.4%, the party failed to win a seat. However, it won council seats in Meru, Kitui and Makueni counties.

In August 2026 Ndindi Nyoro, Member of the National Assembly for Kiharu Constituency, announced that he had accepted an invitation to take over as party leader, Later Appointing as Party Leader In September 2026, BennyHinn Walubengo as the party's Secretary General.
