= Henry Ole Ndiema =

Kenyan politician

Henry Tiole Ole Ndiema

Senator of Trans-Nzoia county
- Incumbent
- Assumed office 2015
- President: Uhuru Kenyatta

Personal details
- Born: 1954 (age 71–72)
- Party: Ford

Henry Tiole Ole Ndiema (born 1954) is a Kenyan politician. He was the senator representing Trans-Nzoia County in the Senate of Kenya between 2013 - 2017. He is a member of the Ford Kenya and a coalition member of NASA. He was elected to office at the 2013 Kenya general elections.
