= Murang'a County =

Coordinates: 0°45′S 37°7′E

- County
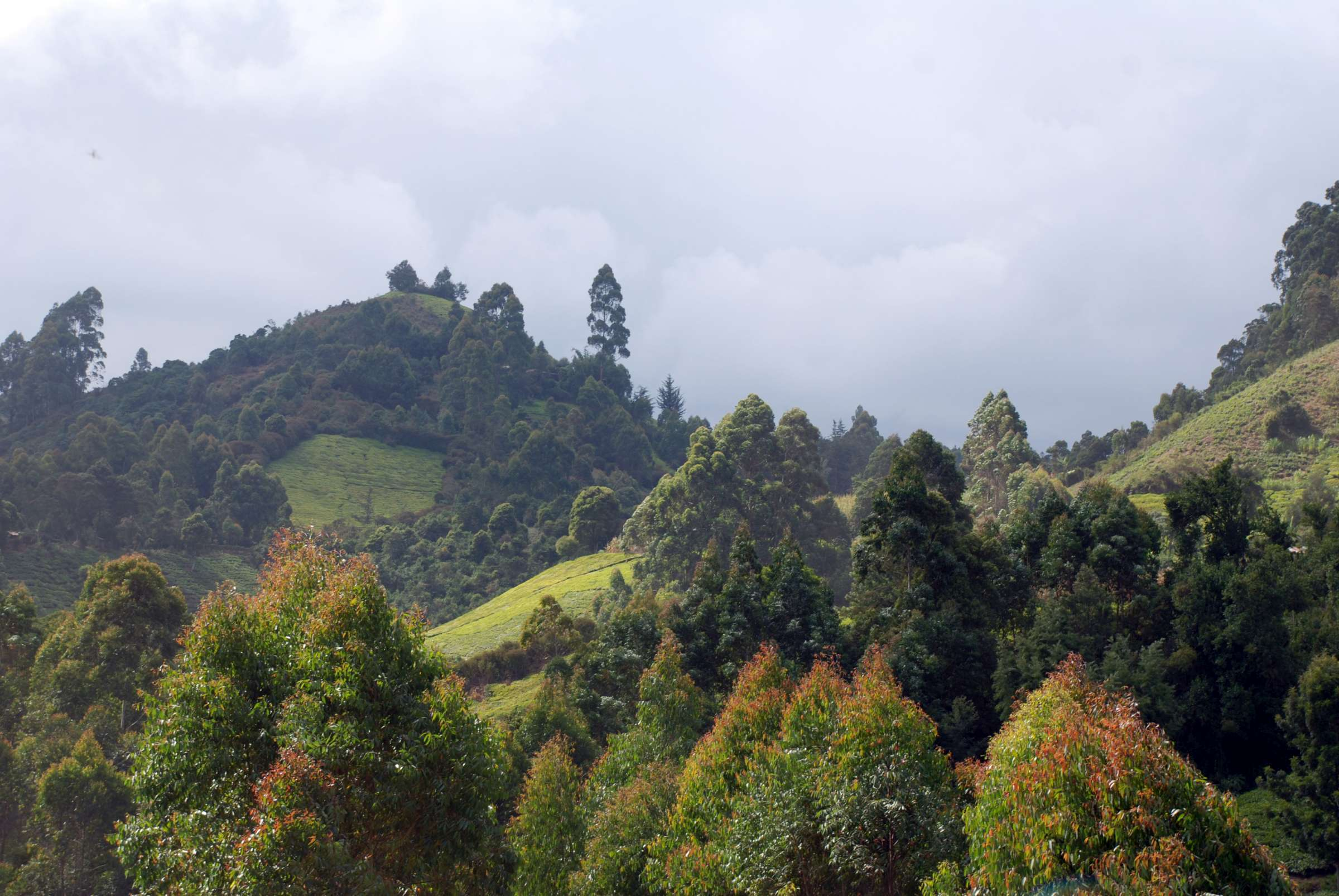
- Murang’a County Landscape

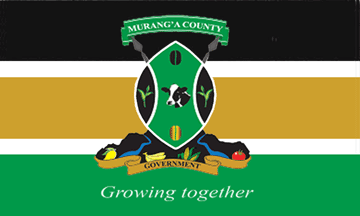
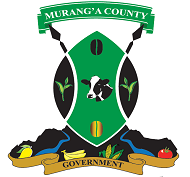
- Flag Coat of arms

- Location in Kenya
- Country: Kenya
- Formed: 4 March 2013
- Capital: Murang'a

Government
  - Governor: Irungu Kang'ata

Area
  - Total: 2,325.8 km^{2} (898.0 sq mi)

Population (2019)
  - Total: 1,056,640
  - Density: 454.31/km^{2} (1,176.7/sq mi)
- Time zone: UTC+3 (EAT)
- Website: muranga.go.ke

Murang'a County is a county in Central, Kenya in the Mount Kenya region. Its largest town and capital is Murang'a, which was referred to as Fort Hall during the colonial era. The county is inhabited mainly by, and is considered the birthplace of the Gikuyu, the largest ethnic group in Kenya. The county had a population of 1,056,640 as of the 2019 census.. Its southern part is part of the Nairobi Metropolitan Area forming the largest metropolitan area in East Africa

== History ==
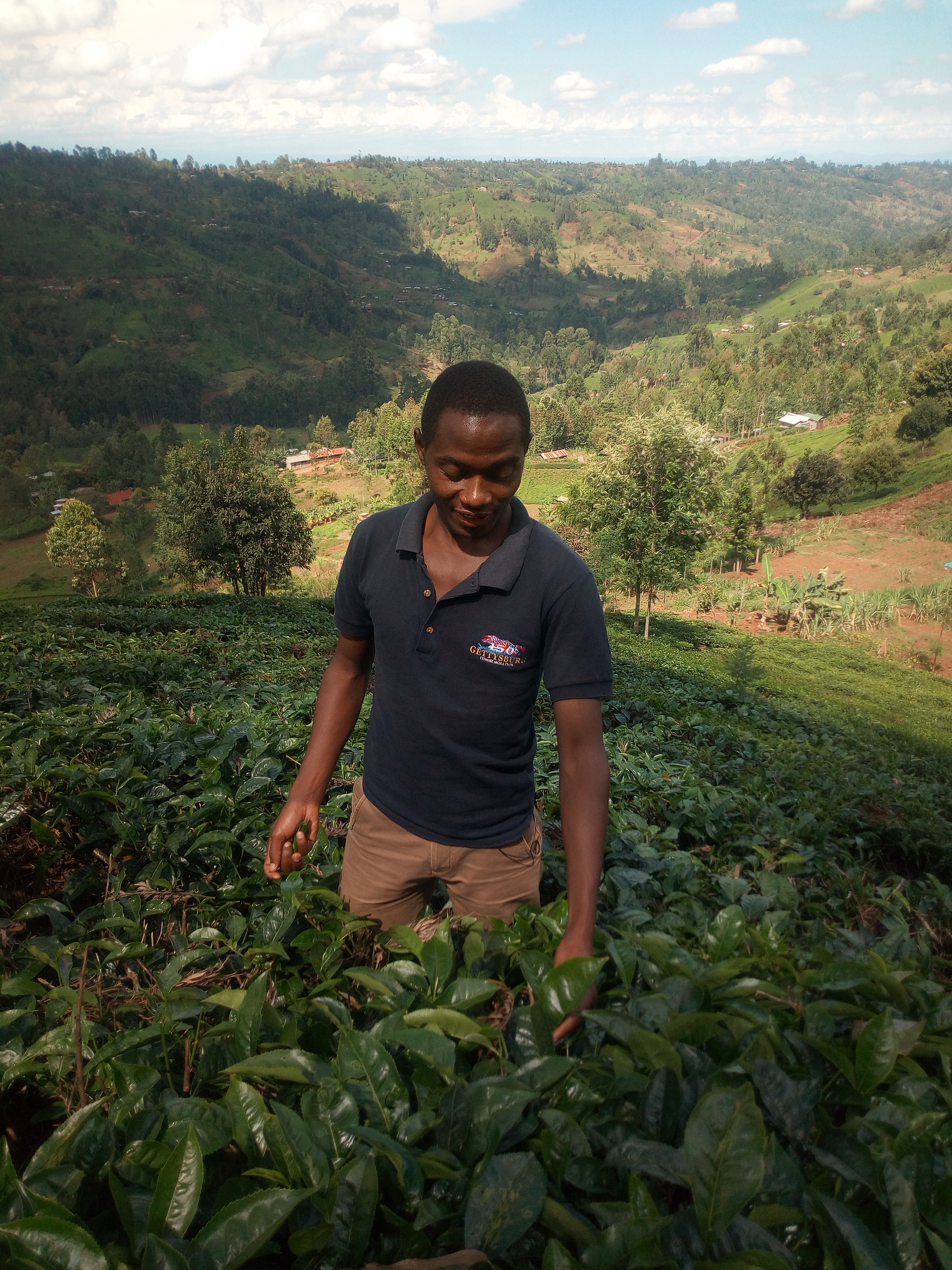
Tea farming in Muranga County.

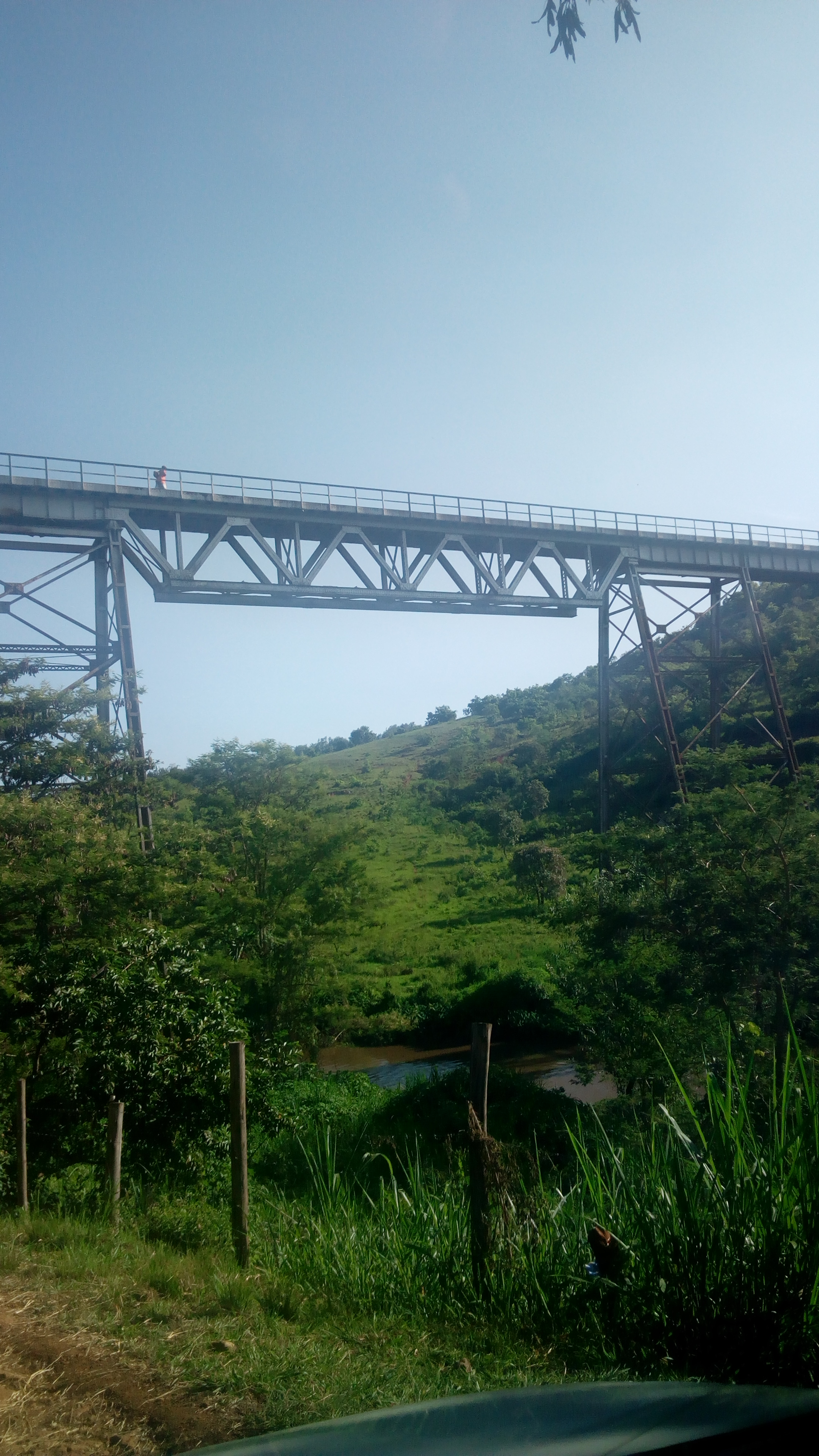
Railway bridge crossing Maragua river.

When missionaries first came to Kenya, they found the Coast Region already inhabited by Portuguese who had taken the coast strategically for trade from Arab powers in the 16th century. The missionaries ventured into Kenya's rugged interior and Murang'a was one of the first places they settled.

One of the main highlights of Murang'a's history, however, is the Mau Mau uprising that was led by the Agikuyu community who consider Murang'a their ancestral origin. Murang'a is thus considered, at least by some, the birthplace of the Kenyan independence movement.

Missionaries had initially been welcomed by Karuri Wagakure who was the chief of Tuthu. They set up the first mission church in Kenya at Murang'a.

Murang'a is also the source of Rivers Maragua, which originates from the heart of the Aberdare Range, Mathioya, Kayahwe, Irati and Muriurio among others.

Additionally, Murang'a is known for its fertile soil and good climate, which are good for farming. Among the food crops grown in this county include maize, beans, sweet potatoes, arrow roots, pumpkins, and bananas.

Tea and coffee are the county's main cash crops.

== County government ==
The Constitution of Kenya (2010) created 47 regional governments with the formerly larger Murang'a district as a county. The County Government has two arms, and these are; the County Assembly and the County Executive.

. The county uses the code 021 on the national coding scheme and locals famously refer to the county as Metumi.

=== Executive ===
From 2013 to 2022, the Executive arm was headed by Hon. Mwangi wa Iria, who was deputized by Hon Gakure Monyo during his first term and Hon Maina Kamau in his second term. In his last term, Mwangi wa Iria was assisted by a team of ministerial members referred to as County Executive Committee (CEC), which had ten other members. The individuals and their portfolios included:

CEC member	Portfolio
Hon. Githirwa M. Macharia	Environment & Natural Resources
Hon. Muiruri Maina Edward	Youth, Sports, Gender, Culture, social services Co-operatives & special Programmes.
Hon. George M. Kamau	Finance, IT & Economic Planning
Hon. Nyambura Macharia	Public Service
Hon. Albert Mwaniki	Agriculture, Livestock & Irrigation
Hon. Eng. Amos Njoroge	Energy Transport & Infrastructure Development
Hon. David W. Waweru	Commerce, Trade, Industry & Investment
Hon. Dr. Susan Muthoni Magada	Health, water & sanitation
Hon. Gerishon Nyagia	Education & Technical Training
Hon. Sarah Masaki	Lands, Housing & Planning

Following the end of the two terms of governorship by Mwangi wa Iria as stipulated by the Kenyan Law, Murang'a County voters voted in Dr. Francis Irungu Kang’ata as their second Governor in August 2022 general elections. Governor Francis Irungu took Oath of Office on 25 August 2022, together with his deputy Stephen Mburu Munania, who became the third Deputy Governor of Murang'a County.

=== County Assembly ===
Murang’a County Assembly is located in Murang’a town along Kiria-ini Road. The Assembly is housed in the building formerly occupied by the Municipal Council of Murang’a.

Murang’a County has 35 MCAs, a speaker and 16 nominated members. The position of the Speaker of the Assembly was formerly held by Hon. Leonard Nduati, deputized by Hon. Moses Gachui. Johnson Mukuha was voted in as the new Speaker in September 2022 by the majority of Members of County Assembly (MCAs). The Assembly is administratively managed by Clerk to the Assembly, a post formerly occupied by Peter Ndegwa Mbue. The current Clerk to the Assembly is Mr. Kuria Thuita.

MEMBERS OF MURANG'A COUNTY ASSEMBLY(2022–2027)

1. Speaker - Johnson Mukuha - UDA
2. Deputy speaker - Moses Gachui Mungai - UDA
3. Majority Leader - Francis Kibe Kamau - UDA

Elected Members of County Assembly.

Name	Political Party	Ward
Alex Ndunda Makau	PNU	Ithanga
Alex Wanyoike Wainaina	UDA	Mugumo-ini
Benard Ruiru Njeri	UDA	Mbiri
Boniface Nga’ng’a Mbau	IND	Muthithi
Caroline Wairimu Njoroge	UDA	Kigumo
Elizabeth Wambui Mwangi	UDA	Kimorori Wempa
Gerald Wambugu Mwangi	IND	Kamacharia
Hilary Muigai Muchoki	UDA	Ichagaki
James Karanja Kabera	IND	Kamahuha
Jeremiah Clement Gichobe Mbatia	UDA	Kariara
John Kamwaga Mwangi	UDA	Mugoiri
John Kibaiya Ngugi	UDA	Gatanga
John Munyua	UDA	Gaichanjiru
John Mwangi Kamau	UDA	Nginda
Karina Charles Machigo	UDA	Township
Laban Chomba Njaramba	UDA	Kambiti
Liz Muthoni Mbugua	UDA	Kinyona
Margaret Wanjiku Gichia	ANC	Wangu
Morris Thuku Gathoni	UDA	Kiru
Moses Macharia Mirara	UDA	Kangari
Naomi Nyambura Maina	UDA	Ruchu
Njeri Gathee	IND	Gaturi
Njoroge Chefman Isaac	UDA	Kahumbu
Peter Munga Njuguna	IND	Murarandia
Peter Murigi Ngugi	UDA	Muruka
Mwangi Wa Kuria	UDA	Kagundi-ini
Simon Mwaura Wamwea	UDA	Ng’araria
Steven Muigai Kimani	UDA	Kakuzi Mitumburi
Thomas Muteti Mwaura	UDA	Makuyu

== Population ==
Historical population
Year	Pop.	±%
1979	648,333	—
1989	858,063	+32.3%
1999	736,273	−14.2%
2009	942,581	+28.0%
2019	1,056,640	+12.1%

=== Religion ===
Religion in Murang'a County

Religion (2019 Census)	Number
Protestant	415,159
Catholicism	259,936
Evangelical Churches	207,410
African instituted Churches	103,788
Orthodox	5,119
Other Cristian	36,738
Islam	3,640
Hindu	59
Traditionists	1,000
Other	7,704
No Religion/Atheists	11.496
Don't Know	910
Not Stated	100

== Learning Institutions ==
Currently, there is only one public university in the county, known as Murang’a University of Technology (MUT). MUT was established in September 2011 via Murang’a University College order legal notice No. 129 September 2011 as a constituent College of Jomo Kenyatta University of Agriculture and Technology. MUT is the successor of Murang’a University College and Murang'a College of Technology. The university currently operates under the provision of the Universities Act 2012 CAP 210 B of the laws of Kenya.

The university is located 1.5 km from Murang'a town, 85 km North East of Nairobi, 70 km South East of Nyeri and 50 km South West of Embu.

There is also Kenya Medical Training College Murang’a Campus (KMTC). This Medical Training College is situated in Murang’a town, approximately 1 km from the town center. Having started in the 1950s as a training Centre for Mid-wives, the college morphed into training nurses and gradually started offering Certificate and Diploma Courses in Nursing and Mental Health Psychiatry. Murang'a county also has a teachers training college, Murang'a Teachers college in Makuyu. The college offers training for primary school teachers. Another public institution is the Michuki Technical Training Institute which is located near Karugia Shopping Centre in Kangema subcounty.

In 2022 Murang'a Technical Institute a TVET institute was opened in Maragua Town and offers diplomas and certificates in various trade

== Economy ==
Murang’a County's economy is deeply rooted in agriculture, real estate and agro-processing. Tea, coffee, macadamia, avocado and dairy dominate trade—with avocado orchards yielding ~KSh 1.5 M/acre/year and coffee and tea fuelled by contract-farming schemes. There are major agri‑businesses like KTDA tea factories; of which Murang’a County is one of Kenya's top tea producer, earning the highest tea revenue nationally over the years. In 2024, local farmers received over KSh 17.8 billion in earnings, accounting for approximately 20% of KTDA's total earnings, highest of any county, with bonuses exceeding KSh 52 per kilo. The thriving tea sector drives rural livelihoods, trade, and investment in value-added processing and cooperative societies.

Kakuzi Limited PLC grows avocados, macadamia, blueberries, tea, and livestock—supporting 3,000+ smallholder farmers via its Avocado Smallholder Programme—and recently launched a macadamia oil plant, boosting value-addition and employment. Del Monte Kenya with pineapple farms in Murang’a, is a major exporter of canned pineapple and juice concentrates. It partners with Murang’a farmers through out-grower schemes and operates CSR initiatives, value addition, rural employment and infrastructure projects. Kakuzi supports farmers through various programs.

Real estate around Thika Greens, Kenol town and Murang’a town is booming. Thika Greens Golf Resort hosted the Murang’a Investment Forum (June 13–14, 2025), where plans for industrial parks, agro-processing zones, and a 500‑acre export processing zone were unveiled with an aim to catalyze investment. Kenol Town (positioned on the Nairobi–Embu–Meru highway and the new Kenol–Isiolo superhighway) is seeing rising demand for residential and commercial lands. Murang’a town is also experiencing a boom in real estate and infrastructure development.

The synergy between booming real estate, industrialization and agriculture (with expanding orchards and processing zones) is transforming Murang’a into a dynamic commerce hub, catalyzed by policy support, private investment and infrastructure such as dual carriageways and smart-market upgrades.

== County subdivisions ==
Sub-Counties.
Sub-County	Population	Headquarters
Kiharu	185,600	Murang’a Town
Kangema	82,401	Kangema Town
Mathioya	110,139	Kiria-ini Town
Maragua	196,170	Maragua Town
Kigumo	136,921	Kigumo Town
Kandara	180,098	Kandara Town
Gatanga	202, 023	Mabanda Div Hq.
Total	1,093,352	

Electoral Constituencies in Murang'a County:

- Kangema Constituency
- Kiharu Constituency
- Mathioya Constituency
- Kigumo Constituency
- Kandara Constituency
- Maragwa Constituency
- Gatanga Constituency

Urban Centers in Murang'a County:

- Kangare
- Kirwara
- Kenol
- Kandara
- Kabati
- Makuyu
- Maragwa
- Kangema
- Kiriani
- Sabasaba
- Gatura

== Central Kenya Region ==
=== Urbanisation ===
Urbanisation in Central Kenya
County	Urbanisation in Central Kenya (Per cent)
Kiambu County	60.8
Nyeri County	24.5
Nyandarua County	18.5
Murang’a County	16.3
Kirinyaga County	15.8
Kenya Average	32.3
Urbanisation by County in Central Kenya

=== Wealth/Poverty Level ===
Wealth/Poverty Level in Central Kenya
County	Poverty Level in Central Kenya (Per cent)
Kirinyaga County	25.2
Murang’a County	28.5
Kiambu County	28.9
Nyeri County	32.7
Nyandarua County	46.6
Kenya Average	45.9
Poverty level by County

== Notable people ==
- Paramount Chief Karuri wa Gakure - A colonial tribal leader who died in 1916 who at one time was senior most chief in Kiambu, Murang'a and Nyeri Counties.
- Bildad Kaggia - A nationalist, activist, and politician. One of the Kapenguria Six prominent Kenyan nationalists.
- Kenneth Matiba – A Politician, an activist, former Cabinet Minister, First Kenyan Opposition Leader, Businessman and civil servant.
- Dr. Julius Gikonyo Kiano- First black Kenyan to get a PhD degree, one founding figures of the Republic of Kenya, member of the initial independent Kenya cabinet and long time cabinet minister; one time frontrunner for post of Secretary of UNCTAD. Jointly with Tom Mboya organised with assistance of John F. Kennedy, initially as Senator and briefly as President of US, the educational scholarships for many Kenyans who furthered their education in USA in the late 1950s and early 1960s, referred as the Kennedy Airlifts program.
- Charles Rubia – First African Mayor of Nairobi, former Member of Parliament for Starehe Constituency, former Cabinet Minister in Kenyatta's Regime and a champion for Multi-party Democracy in Kenya, which he is mostly remembered for.
- Joseph Kamotho - Former Cabinet Minister and a Member of Parliament for Kangema Constituency, one of the most influential politicians in Moi's era.
- Professor Njuguna Ndung'u - A Kenyan economist, ex-Minister of Finance and the 8th Central Bank of Kenya Governor.
- Dr. Patrick Njoroge - 9th Governor of Central Bank of Kenya, the first Kenyan to earn a PhD from Yale University.
- Samuel Kamau Macharia - Also known as S.K. Macharia, a billionaire businessman who is the founder and chairman of Royal Media Services, one of Africa's largest private radio and television networks.
- Chris Kirubi - A billionaire businessman, an entrepreneur, and an industrialist.
- Peter Munga – A billionaire Businessman, Entrepreneur, the founder and Chairman of Equity Group.
- Dr. James Mwangi – A billionaire business executive, an entrepreneur, and Current C.E.O of Equity Group.
- Nicholas Ng'ang'a – The Chairman Safaricom PLC, Chairman of Board Kakuzi Limited, Chairman of Board Tea Board of Kenya.
- Dr. Benson Wairegi — A billionaire businessman and business executive; he is the Group Managing Director Britam Holdings and former Chancellor for Kenyatta University.
- Dr. John Kibunga Kimani - A billionaire investor born in Makuyu, Murang'a; who is the second-largest shareholder in agricultural giant Kakuzi Limited Plc, and a top individual investor in Safaricom, Centum Investment Company, and Nation Media Group.
- Mwangi wa Iria – Former Governor Murang'a County.
- Irungu Kan'gata – Current Governor Murang'a County, Former Senate of Kenya Majority Chief Whip, a lawyer and a university law lecturer.
- Kembi Gitura – Former Senator Murang'a County, former Deputy Speaker of the Senate of Kenya.
- Peter Kenneth – Presidential candidate 2013 elections, Former Assistant Minister and Member of Parliament.
- Anthony Muheria - A Catholic bishop who serves as Archbishop of the Archdiocese of Nyeri, brother to Dr. Patrick Njoroge.
- Joseph Kamaru – The Late Renowned Benga Musician.
- John De'Mathew - Real name John Ng'ang'a Mwangi, a Kikuyu Benga artist who died in 2019.
- [MC Sollex Mwana Mwega] Renowned Events MC and Musician, Best known for political events.
- John Njoroge Michuki – An entrepreneur, businessman and former Cabinet Minister.
- Elias Mbau – Former MP for Maragua Constituency.
- Ndindi Nyoro – Current MP Kiharu and Chairperson of the National Assembly Budget and Appropriations Committee.
- Clement Muchiri Wambugu – Former MP, Mathioya Constituency
- Gerishon Kirima - A Kenyan real estate tycoon and a former Member of Parliament for Starehe Constituency. (d. 2010)
- Maina wanjigi - A veteran politician, former Cabinet Minister and father to Jimmy Wanjigi.
- Jimmy Wanjigi - A billionaire businessman and political strategist.
- Jimnah Mbaru – A billionaire businessman, Politician, Entrepreneur, Chairman Dyer & Blair Investment Bank, former Chairman Nairobi Securities Exchange.
- Sabina Chege - The former Women Representative for Murang'a County.
- Alice Muthoni Wahome – Former MP Kandara, and Current Cabinet Secretary for Water, Sanitation, and Irrigation.
- Wangu wa Makeri – A woman colonial chief
- Peter Kagwanja – A Scholar, Former Presidential Adviser.
- Jamleck Kamau – Former Kigumo Constituency Member of Parliament.
- James Wainaina Macharia - Former CS for Roads and Health during Uhuru Kenyatta's era.

== See also ==
- Kikuyu people
- Dedan Kimathi
- Jomo Kenyatta
- Kiriaini
