= Murang'a University of Technology =

University in Kenya

- Murang'a University of Technology
- Motto in English: Innovation for Prosperity
- Type: Public
- Established: 2016
- Vice-Chancellor: Prof. Dickson Nyariki
- Faculty: 150
- Administrative staff: 400
- Students: 14000
- Location: Muranga County, Kenya; 0.716°S 37.147°E
- Campus: Main Campus (1.5 km from Murang'a Town) Town Campus (located in Aharuka building, Murang'a Town) Mariira campus= located in Mariira farm 3km from Kigumo town
- Website: mut.ac.ke

Murang'a University of Technology (MUT) is the successor of Murang'a University College (MRUC), a former constituent college of Jomo Kenyatta University of Agriculture and Technology (JKUAT) after being elevated from Murang'a College of Technology (MCT). The university is located 1.5 km from Murang'a town in Muranga County, 85 km northeast of Nairobi, 70 km southeast of Nyeri and 50 km southwest of Embu.

MUT offers masters, degree, diploma, certificate, and craft courses in engineering, information technology, computing, business, commerce, human resource management, hospitality management, tourism management, pure and applied sciences.

== History ==
Murang'a University of Technology is the former Murang’a University College (MRUC) which was established in September 2011 via Murang’a University College order legal notice No. 129 of September 2011 as a constituent college of Jomo Kenyatta University of Agriculture and Technology. MRUC is the successor of Murang’a College of Technology. The university college currently operates under the provision of the Universities Act 2012 CAP 210 B of the laws of Kenya. The first Murang’a University Council was inaugurated in October 2013
