= Kakuzi Limited =

Kenyan agricultural company

Kakuzi PLC
- Type: Public
- Traded as: KN: KUKZ
- Industry: Agricultural
- Headquarters: Nairobi, Kenya
- Key people: Nicholas Ng'ang'a, Chairman; J. L.G. Maonga, Secretary; C. Flowers, Managing Director
- Products: Tea, Livestock, Avocados, Forestry Products, Blueberries
- Parent: Camellia PLC
- Website: www.kakuzi.co.ke

Kakuzi PLC is a listed Kenyan superfood producer trading on the Nairobi and London Stock Exchange, engaging in the cultivation, processing and marketing of avocados, blueberries, macadamia, tea, livestock and commercial forestry. Kakuzi continuously strives to build a sustainable agricultural portfolio that can mitigate weather risks to which the sector has historically been subjected. The company’s development plans are in full swing, with significant additional areas of avocado and macadamia being planted, and trials for blueberry development in progress.

== History ==
=== Sisal Ltd ===
The history of Kakuzi dates back to the colonial period with the arrival of Mr. Donald Farquharson Seth-Smith in British East Africa in 1906. A graduate of Oxford, he was a distinguished athlete, and upon arrival in Kenya, he started his business in agriculture. In 1907, Donald, together with Mr. Mervyn Ridley and Lord Cranworth they bought land (10117 ha) in Makuyu where they established their agribusiness. The farm was run by Mervyn and Donald who experimented with different crops before settling on sisal. They named the estate Sisal Ltd and with increased demand for sisal, the business flourished.

=== Coffee and tea ===
Kakuzi Fiberlands Limited was incorporated in 1919, with interests in sisal and coffee. It neighboured Sisal Limited and during this time, Sisal limited diversified its portfolio to include tea which was grown in Nandi Hills. This prompted Kakuzi, then majority-owned by Eastern Produce to acquire Siret Tea Estate in 1948.

=== Merger ===
The two firms merged in 1966 to form Kakuzi Plc. In 1987 sisal production ceased owing to increased competition from synthetic fibers. The focus was therefore shifted towards other crops. Following a significant drought in 1984, the coffee plantations started to show symptoms of a serious fungal disease, Fusarium, which had been imported from poorly run neighbouring estates. New planting was not an option as this became infected as well and diversification into other crops resulted. Avocados were particularly viable and planted in large areas. Another diversification, on land unsuitable for more valuable crops, is forestry. Planting started in 1992, and by the end of 2010, some 1242 Hectares had been planted. Cattle were a further diversification during the 1980s, when the size of the herd peaked at 7,500. As of August 2011, the herd was 4,407.

=== Acquisition by Camellia ===
As early as 1948, interests in Kenya's agricultural industry had gained shape. Eastern Produce acquired tea estates in Nandi (Siret Tea Estate). Camellia acquired majority interests in Eastern Produce limited which had interests in Kenya and Malawi. By 1990, Camellia had majority interests in Kakuzi through its subsidiaries; Eastern Produce Plc (34.19%) and Lawrie Group Plc (7.53%). In 1991, Linton Park Plc acquired Eastern Produce and further increased their holdings to 42.83%. By 1994 Linton Park, a subsidiary of Camellia held 50.1% of the outstanding shares. Currently the stake is held by two subsidiaries; Bordue Ltd (26.06%) and Lintak Investments Ltd. (24.64%). Notably, the largest individual shareholder is John Kibunga Kimani with a 32.20% stake. He is also a Non-Executive Director effective November 1, 2020.

== Controversies and accusations of human rights violations ==
In 2017, a group of Kenyans petitioned Kenya's National Land Commission, claiming that colonialists had forced them off land Kakuzi then claimed to own, confiscated their animals and left them destitute. More local community groups later joined the petition in laying claim to the company's land.

In February 2019, avocado farmers in Murang'a county threatened to take court action against Kakuzi, accusing the company of breaching an avocado supply contract and not paying them in full.

In October 2020, the law firm Leigh Day said it had initiated legal action against UK firm Camellia, the parent of Kakuzi, on behalf of 79 Kenyans who accused Kakuzi's security guards of perpetrating abuses since 2009 including killings, rape, attacks and false imprisonment. Following these allegations, UK supermarket chain Tesco suspended avocado supply from Kakuzi Kenya due to the abuse claims. Two more large European supermarket chains, Sainsbury's and Lidl, later suspended deals with Kakuzi. In February 2021, Camellia settled the court case for £4.6 million (Kes 696 million). The sum included compensation, legal costs and funding schemes for the community. However, the company did not issue an apology.

In June 2021, two additional women came forward with new allegations that they had been raped by security guards at Kakuzi farm. On August 3, Kenya's Capital Market Authority questioned the CEO and CFO of Kakuzi about allegations of tax evasion through transfer pricing and conflict of interest by its majority shareholder.

== See also ==
- Del Monte Kenya
- List of Companies of Kenya
