= Wanja Michuki =

Kenyan businesswoman and corporate executive

- Born: c. 1974 (age 51–52); Kenya
- Citizenship: Kenyan
- Education: Bryn Mawr College; Columbia Business School
- Occupations: Businesswoman, financial analyst and family enterprise coach, consultant, advisor
- Years active: 1974–present
- Title: Managing director of Be Bold Consulting and Advisory Limited

Wanja Yvonne Michuki is a Kenyan family enterprise coach, consultant, advisor and financial analyst. She sits on a number of corporate boards of directors, including Kenya Agricultural Finance Corporation, based in Nairobi, Kenya. She is a member of the advisory board at Columbia Global Centers, based in Nairobi. She serves as the managing director at Be Bold Consoling and Advisory Limited, a Kenyan family enterprise coaching, consulting, and advisory firm that she founded in 2015. She is a member of the Family Firm Institute, based in Boston, Massachusetts, United States. She is also a chartered financial analyst (CFA) and a Salzburg Global Fellow.

== Background and education ==
Michuki was born to Kenyan parents in 1974. Her father, the late John Michuki, was a cabinet minister in the government led by the late Mwai Kibaki, Kenya's third president. She is the youngest daughter in the family.

She holds a Bachelor of Arts degree in Economics, from Bryn Mawr College in Pennsylvania, United States. Later, she obtained a Master of Business Administration degree from Columbia Business School in New York City.

== Career ==
As an undergraduate she worked briefly as a summer associate at Meryll Lynch (today a component of Bank of America). She was a corporate analyst at Barclays Merchant Finance Limited and then as a research manager at Barclays Trust Investment Services Limited. In 2003, she founded the Highland Tea Company LLC, based in New York City. She ran that business until 2008.

Between 2009 and 2014, she worked as a Trade, Investment and Multilateral Diplomat for the Kenyan Ministry of Foreign Affairs and International Trade, based in London, United Kingdom.

In 2015, she founded Be Bold Consultancy and Advisory Limited, a private financial consulting and executive coaching company, where she serves as the firm's managing director to date.
