= Wangu wa Makeri =

Kikuyu tribal chief

Wangũ Wa Makeri
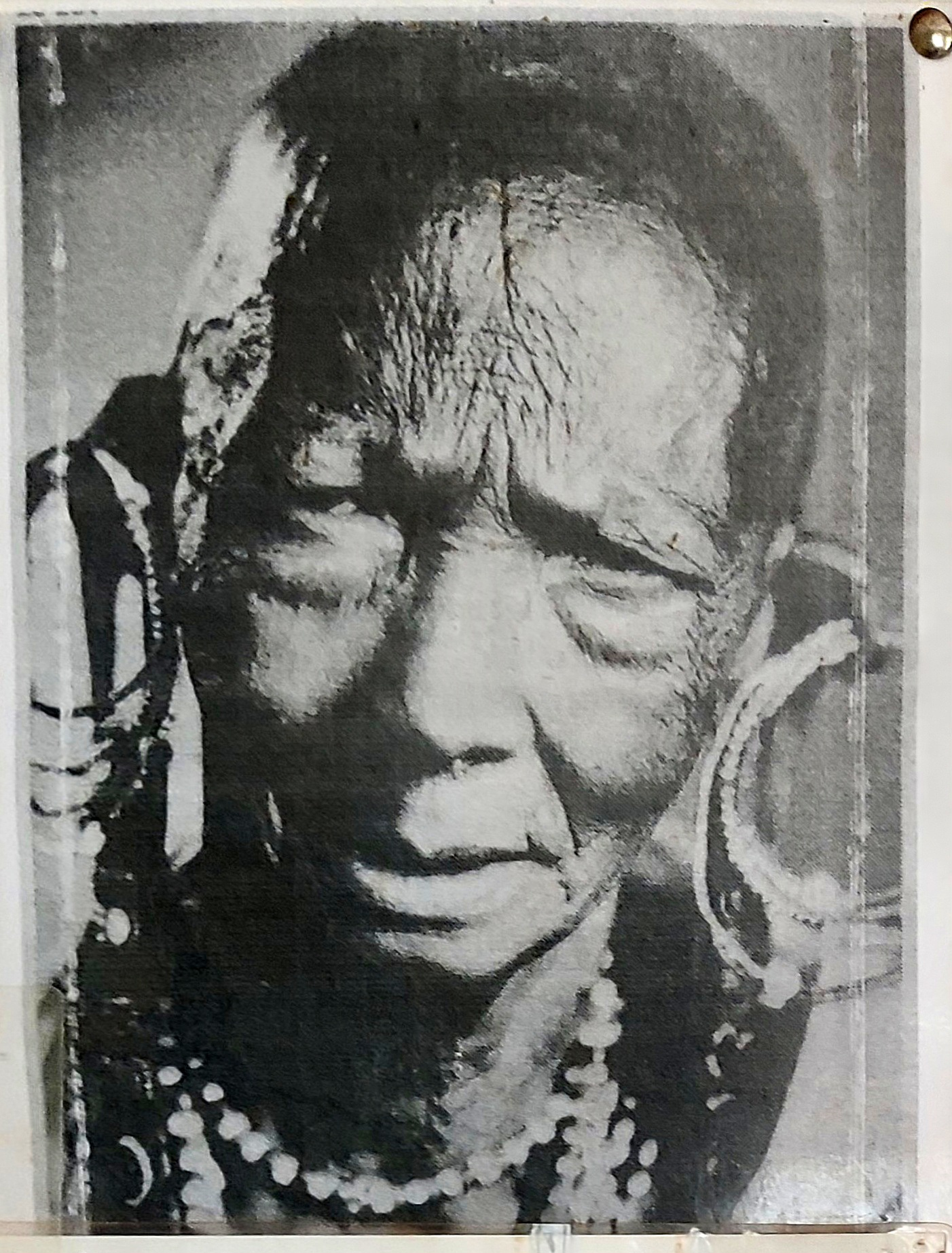
- Born: 1856; Gìtie village, Kenya
- Died: 1936 (aged 79–80)
- Title: Headman
- Term: 1902–1909
- Successor: Ikai wa Gathimba
- Spouse: Makeri wa Mbogo
- Children: Six
- Parents: Gatuìka Macharia (father); Wakerū (mother)

Wangũ wa Makeri (c. 1856–1915 or 1936) was a Kikuyu tribal chief, known as a headman, during the British Colonial period in Kenya. She was the only female Kikuyu headman during the period, who later resigned following a scandal in which she engaged in a Kibata dance; this was the ultimate transgression since kibata was never to be danced by women.

== Early life ==
Wangũ Wa Makeri was born around 1856 in Gìtie village to Gatuìka Macharia and Wakerū. She had no formal education, instead working on her parents’ farm as a labourer. It was there that she met her husband, Makeri wa Mbogo. Together, they raised their six children in a traditional Kikuyu home in Weithaga, within the modern Central Province of Kenya.

== Headman ==
She entered into a relationship with the paramount chief of Fort Hall (now Murang'a), Karuri wa Gakure, after he stopped on occasion in her village and stayed with the family. Her husband knew about this, and in response was offered the position of headman, which he declined. Instead, Gakure offered the position to Makeri, which she accepted in 1902. This was at a time when the position was exclusively male-only, and Makeri was the only female headman of the Kikuyu during the whole of the British Colonial period.

By this time, the British colonial authorities had begun a taxation system, enforced by other locals. Makeri acted as the go-between for the Kikuyu and these authorities, under which she became a controversial figure to her people. She was later described as an authoritarian tax collector, who would intimidate tax evaders and imprison them in solitary confinement. Makeri would use those people as seats, sitting on their backs as they knelt. She sent one of her sons to the local mission school in 1903.

=== Resignation ===
Her relationship with Gakure continued throughout the period in which she was headman. At a meeting between 2 and 4 June 1909, she engaged in a Kibata dance during which her grass skirt fell off leaving her naked. This was an exclusively male warrior dance, and as a result of the scandal, she was forced to resign from office with Ikai wa Gathimba replacing her. One of her sons, Muchiri, would later become headman himself. Makeri died in 1915. Wangu's reign is quite similar to a time long in the past when women took over power and leadership from the men and ruled ruthlessly. This is due to the rampant alcoholism in men of the days. It took the efforts of an age-set called Ndemi na Mathathi to save the boy child from alcoholism. They proceeded to impregnate all the women at the same time. At their weakness due to pregnancy, the men retook leadership.

== Sources ==
- Akyeampong, Emmanuel Kwaku; Gates, Jr., Henry Louis (2012). Dictionary of African Biography. New York: Oxford University Press. ISBN 978-0-195382-075.
- Wanyoike, Mary W. (2002). Wangu wa Makeri. Makers of Kenya's History. Nairobi: East African Educational Publishers. ISBN 978-9-966251-121.
