= Queen Jane (musician) =

Kenyan benga musician

- Also known as: Queen Jane
- Born: Jane Nyambura; 1964/1965; Mugoiri, Kangîma, Murang'a County
- Origin: Murang'a
- Died: June 29, 2010 Nairobi
- Genres: benga music

Jane Nyambura (1964/1965 – June 29, 2010), better known by her stage name Queen Jane was a Kenyan benga musician performing in Kikuyu language.

Queen Jane was born in Kangema, Murang'a County. She started her musical career in 1984 as a back up vocalist for Mbiri Young Stars under the band leader Musaimo (Simon Kihara). She formed her own band Queenja Les Les and released her debut album Ndorogonye in 1991, produced by Lemanco Productions

Her career reached prominence a year later upon the release of her hit song Mwendwa KK. Her other hits include Ndūtige Kwiyaba, Mūici Wa Itūra, Mūthuri Teenager, "Mukuigwa Uguo" and Arūme Ni Nyamū. Many of her songs handled social issues.

Her last album Gìkūyū Giitū (Our Gìkūyū (Language/tribe)) was released in early 2010. Maina David Mithu of Leemax Studio has been one of her producers.

She won awards from the Music Copyright Society of Kenya (MCSK) and Music Composers Association. Her song Nduraga Ngwetereire (I've been Waiting for You) was released on The Rough Guide to the Music of Kenya compilation CD.

Queen Jane died of meningitis on June 29, 2010, at St Mary's Hospital in Nairobi after a spell of illness. Her funeral was postponed as her relatives disputed over the place of her burial. Her siblings Ejidiah Wanja (aka Lady Wanja) and Agnes Wangui (Princess Aggie) are also musicians. Kenyan politician John Michuki, who deceased in 2012 was her uncle.

== Discography ==
- Mwendwa KK
- Ndutige Kwiyamba
- Guka Nindarega
- Maheni ti Thiiri
- Mwana wa Ndigwa
- Muici wa Itura
- Muthuri Teenager
- Arume Ni Nyamu
- Arume ni Njegeni
- Nduraga Ngwetereire
- Cirū Witū
- Bobby
- Ndīmūnogu
- Mwendwa Nyumbūrīra
- Nowe Dawa
- Twaremire Nderi
- Maprofessor
- Ndungiyonera muoyo
