= John De'Mathew =

Kenyan musician

John De'Mathew, real name is John Ng'ang'a Mwangi, born in GathirûinÎ village, which lies in the Mûkûrwe-inÎ sub-location of Gatanga Constituency, Mûrang’a County, Kenya. He was a Kikuyu Benga artist who died in 2019 due to a tragic road accident along the Thika Super Highway. He was recognized as the Kikuyu prophet since his music passed across coded messages that came to pass. In July 2012, John De'Mathew and two others were arraigned in court over hate songs.

== Early life and education ==
John De’Mathew was born in GathirûinÎ village Gatanga Constituency, Murang’a County. He was the fourth of eight children. He attended Mûkûrwe-inÎ (now Githambia) Primary School, later joining Naaro Secondary School in Kandara and IgÎkÎro Secondary School in Mûrang’a . Before his music career, he engaged in small businesses to make a living, including hawking vegetables at Soko Mjinga market, selling meat in Kariobangi, and later trading plastic sandals in Nakuru.

== Marriage and family ==
De’Mathew was married to two wives, Sarafina Wairimû and Caroline Waithera, with whom he had seven children. Both wives described him as a loving and supportive husband, as well as a present father who cared deeply for his family.

== Music career ==
De’Mathew composed his first song while in Standard Seven. His professional career began in December 1986 with the single Jenifer, supported by musicians Timona Mbûrû and Joseph Wamûmbe. His second release, My Dear Ndukû (1987), became a major hit and propelled him into the limelight.

Over the course of three decades, he recorded more than 50 albums and around 375 songs. His music often employed Kikuyu proverbs and metaphors to pass coded social and cultural messages, earning him the nickname “the Agikûyû prophet.” Some of his notable songs include Njata Yakwa, ThÎ nÎ igiri, My Brother, Pin Number, MwÎhûgûro, Meme Mene Tekeli, and Ngoro GÎtina.

== Legacy ==
Beyond his music, De’Mathew made lasting contributions to the welfare of Kenyan musicians. In 2019, he championed the creation of the Talented Musicians and Composers (TAMCO) Sacco, which brought together artists to promote financial independence and reduce reliance on public fundraisers in times of illness or death. The Sacco, supported by Mûrang’a County Government, later invested in property to secure sustainable income for members.

De’Mathew also played a mentorship role, nurturing upcoming artists and encouraging them to use music as a tool for storytelling, cultural preservation, and empowerment.

He died on 18 August 2019 following a road accident near Blue Post Hotel along the Thika Super Highway. His death was mourned across the nation, with leaders including President Uhuru Kenyatta, Deputy President William Ruto, and Raila Odinga describing him as a cultural icon whose music inspired and educated generations.

== Discography ==
Some of the standout tracks that brought John De’Mathew widespread recognition include:

- My Dear Ndukû (his breakthrough hit in 1987)
- Njata Yakwa
- Pin Number
- MwÎhûgũro
- KÎreke Tũtũranie
- Meme Mene Tekeli
- Ngoro GÎtina
- Arũme KwÎ Na Mbu
- Nengereria Kane
