= Murang'a District =

Former district of Kenya

Coordinates: 0°45′S 37°7′E

Murang'a District (formerly Fort Hall District) was one of the districts of Kenya's Central Province. Its capital town was also now named Murang'a (also formerly Fort Hall). It is inhabited mainly by and is considered the home of the Kikuyu, the largest community in Kenya.

The district was created by the colonial government and existed within two provinces in that period: the Kenia or Kikuyu Province and later in Central Province from 1933. It was named after Fort Hall which was itself named after its founder Francis George Hall. The district and town's names were changed to 'Murang'a' after independence.

By the 2000s, Murang'a District had been split into Murang'a North and Murang'a South districts. In the 2009 census, the two districts had a total population of 778,984, with Murang'a North having 346,283, and Murang'a South with 432,701. In 2010, the High Court declared both Murang'a North and Murang'a South, among other districts created after 1992 unlawful.

After the promulgation of the 2010 constitution of Kenya, the Murang'a District boundaries as of 1992, were recalled to create Murang'a County, which was formally established in March 2013.

== History ==
When missionaries first came to Kenya, they were prevented from settling on the coast by the Portuguese, who had taken the coastal area, strategic for trade, from Arab powers in the 16th century. The missionaries were forced to venture into Kenya's rugged interior, and Murang'a was one of the first places they settled.

When the British set up the East African Protectorate in 1895, their first administrative post, Fort Smith, was located in Kabete.

After the death of Francis George Hall, a fort at Mbiri was named after him, thus the name Fort Hall in the East Africa Protectorate.

== District subdivisions ==
Local authorities (councils)
Authority	Type	Population*	Urban pop.*
Muranga	Municipality	24,443	11,021
Kangema	Town	18,229	3,971
Muranga County	County	305,632	0
Total	-	348,304	14,992
* 1999 census. Source:

Administrative divisions
Division	Population*	Urban pop.*	Headquarters
Kiharu	84,868	10,433	Muranga
Kahuro	92,104	0	
Kangema	61,182	785	
Mathioya	110,139	0	
Total	348,304	11,218	-
* 1999 census. Sources: , ,

The district had three constituencies:

- Kangema Constituency
- Kiharu Constituency
- Mathioya Constituency
