= Kiharu Constituency =

Kenyan electoral constituency

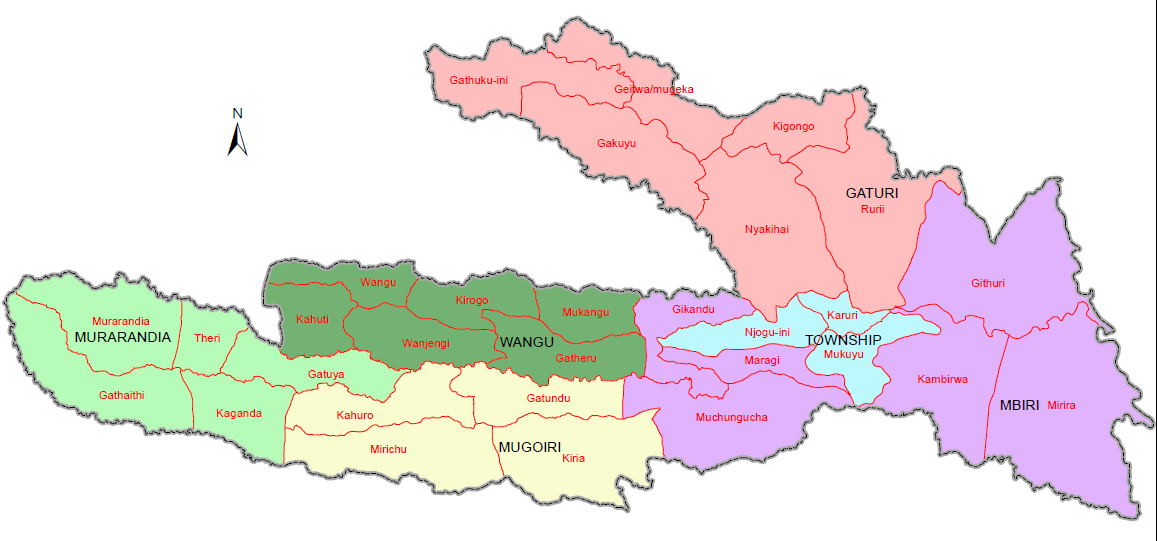
Kiharu Constituency, IEBC March 2012

Kiharū Constituency is an electoral constituency in Kenya. It is one of seven constituencies of Muranga County. The Murang'a town is located within this constituency. Between 1966-1983 the constituency was known as Mbiri Constituency.

Kenneth Matiba, a prominent Kenyan politician, represented this constituency previously. Currently, the constituency is being represented by Ndindi Nyoro.

== Members of Parliament ==
Elections	MP	Party	Notes
1963	Jesse Mwangi Gachago	KANU	
1966	Julius Gikonyo Kiano	KANU	One-party system
1969	Julius Gikonyo Kiano	KANU	One-party system
1974	Julius Gikonyo Kiano	KANU	One-party system
1979	Kenneth Matiba	KANU	One-party system
1983	Kenneth Matiba	KANU	One-party system.
1988	Kenneth Matiba	KANU	One-party system.
1990	Gidraph Mwangi Mweru	KANU	By-elections, one-party system
1992	Kenneth Matiba	Ford-Asili	
1997	Ignatius Ngenye Kariuki	Safina	
2002	Kembi Gitura	NARC	
2007	Barnabas Muturi Mwangi	Sisi Kwa Sisi	
2013	Irungu Kang'ata	TNA	
2017	Ndindi Nyoro	Jubilee Party	
2022	Ndindi Nyoro	United Democratic Alliance	

== Locations and wards ==
Locations	Population
Gaturi	34,020
Gikindu	13,648
Kahuhia	14,720
Mbiri	17,065
Mugoiri	31,508
Murarandia	30,733
Township	21,332
Weithaga	16,442
Total	179,468
1999 census.

Ward	Registered Voters	Local Authority
Central	4,194	Muranga municipality
Gaturi	15,330	Muranga county
Gikindu	5,525	Muranga county
Hospital	3,942	Muranga municipality
Kahuhia	7,221	Muranga county
Maragi	2,023	Muranga municipality
Mbiri Rural	5,675	Muranga county
Mugoiri	15,501	Muranga county
Mukuyu	3,336	Muranga municipality
Mumbi	2,584	Muranga municipality
Murarandia	15,755	Muranga county
Njoguini	2,073	Muranga municipality
Weithaga	8,044	Muranga county
Total	91,203	
*September 2005.
