= Kembi Gitura =

Kenyan politician

Deputy Speaker of the Kenyan Senate
- In office 28 March 2013 – 31 August 2017
- Speaker: Ekwee Ethuro
- Majority: 39 (58.2%)

Member of the Kenyan Senate
- In office 28 March 2013 – 31 August 2017
- Succeeded by: Irungu Kang'ata
- Constituency: Murang'a County

Kenyan Ambassador to Belgium
- In office March 2009 – August 2012
- President: Mwai Kibaki

Member of the Kenyan Parliament
- In office 2003–2007
- Constituency: Kiharu Constituency

Personal details
- Born: 1953 (age 72–73) Kenya Colony
- Party: TNA
- Education: University of Nairobi

James Kembi Gìtūra is a Kenyan politician. He was a Deputy Speaker of the Kenyan Senate between 2013 and 2017.

== Political life ==
Gìtūra represented the Kiharu Constituency in the National Assembly (Kenya) from 2003 to 2007. Subsequently, he was appointed as the Kenyan Ambassador to Belgium, serving from 2009 until his resignation in 2012 in order to stand for election to the Senate.

After winning a seat in the Senate, Gìtūra was elected as the Deputy Speaker of the Senate on 28 March 2013. He received 39 votes.

Gìtūra later lost his seat to Irungu Kang'ata in the 2017 Kenya general election Consequently, Kembi Gìtūra was appointed the Chairperson of KEMSA where he led until 2021 when he was fired for an alleged scandal in procuring COVID-19 supplies. Gìtūra understands the political life of Kenya. He is currently chairperson of the Communications Authority of Kenya (CA).
