= Francis George Hall =

British administrator in East Africa

Francis George Hall (11 October 1860 – 18 March 1901) was a British administrator in East Africa, first for the Imperial British East Africa Company and later the East Africa Protectorate.

== Early life ==
Hall was born in Saugor, British India, the third son of Lieutenant-Colonel E. Hall. He was educated in England at Sherborne School and Tonbridge School.

He was educated at Sherborne before going to work at the Bank of England. In 1880 he quit his job and moved to South Africa. There, he undertook a variety of jobs, including schoolteacher, soldier, farmer, and gold miner before he decided to return to England in 1891.

== East Africa ==
In 1892, at the age of 32, he arrived at Mombasa, having joined the Imperial British East Africa Company as Acting Superintendent of the District of Kikuyu. After making his way inland by foot to Fort Smith, his first task was to build the road between the fort and the Athi river. In 1893 he succeeded as Commander at Fort Smith, following the premature death of his predecessor. Now he was responsible for all within the fort and the protection of caravans travelling upland through Kikuyu territory to Uganda. Responding to Kikuyu raids on caravans he would regularly launch punitive retaliatory raids.

In 1893, he was approached by Maasai and asked to mediate a truce between local Maasai and Kikuyu. Later that year, he sought revenge on Kikuyu found guilty of killing some Maasai, killing nine, wounding five, and seizing a thousand goats and six cattle. Over time Hall built up a formidable reputation and locals increasingly sought him out for protection. In December 1893 year he offered protection to over three hundred Maasai who had survived a recent raid. Hall fostered close relations with the Maasai, keen to use their military expertise rather than to face it. In 1894 he led an expedition of eighty guns and three hundred Maasai and Kikuyu on a raid at Liguru. Before Christmas that year, Ward was seriously injured when attacked by a rhinoceros and a few months later he was bitten by a leopard during a grapple.

Hall remained as District Officer after company control was ceded to the British government in 1895. Later that year he started construction on a fort in Ngong to maintain the peace amongst the Maasai and encourage them to abandon their pastoral lifestyle which provoked livestock theft. The fort was completed in September 1896 and named Fort Elvira. Hall became disillusioned with his role under the new Protectorate administration, complaining he was spending most of his time "slinging ink" with "silly despatches" and he was little more than a police officer guarding the track of the Uganda Railway. In 1899, famine and smallpox decimated the Protectorate, and Hall found himself burying six-eight people a day, extracting lymph from the infected to give to those not yet infected, and trying to feed over three hundred people at Fort Smith.

== Death ==
Hall was to have returned to England in April 1901, but died at Mbiri, present day Murang'a Town, after contracting dysentery on 18 March 1901. The fort at Mbiri, founded by Hall in 1900, would later be named Fort Hall in his memory.

== Personal life ==
He married Beatrice Russell in May 1898 whilst on leave in England.

== Archives ==
- Archive papers of Francis Hall are held by SOAS Special Collections
