= Barnabas Muturi Mwangi =

Kenyan politician

Barnabas Mturi Mwangi is a Kenyan politician. He belongs to Sisi Kwa Sisi and was elected to represent the Kiharu Constituency in the National Assembly of Kenya since the 2007 Kenyan general election.
