= Centre for Research on Multinational Corporations =

Dutch non-profit research and network org

- Stichting Onderzoek Multinationale Ondernemingen
- Abbreviation: SOMO
- Formation: 1973 in Netherlands
- Type: Foundation
- Location: Netherlands, Amsterdam
- Executive director: Audrey Gaughran
- Website: www.somo.nl

The Centre for Research on Multinational Corporations (SOMO–Dutch: Stichting Onderzoek Multinationale Ondernemingen), is an independent, non-profit research and network organization based in Amsterdam, the Netherlands. It focuses on social, ecological and economic issues related to sustainable development. Since 1973, the organization investigates multinational corporations and the consequences of their activities for people and the environment around the world.

== Mission and activities ==
SOMO’s core objective is to challenge unjustified corporate power and promote a fair and sustainable world, prioritizing public interests over private profit. The organization conducts independent, critical research to expose harmful practices, corporate structures, and the enablers of unchecked corporate influence. SOMO works closely with civil society, NGOs, and activist networks around the world, serving as a hub for information, research, and advocacy.

Key activities include:

- Sectoral research: Investigating issues in electronics, energy and water, minerals, agriculture and food, clothing, pharmaceuticals, and financial sectors.
- Corporate accountability: Tracking and analyzing supply chains, tax avoidance, legal loopholes, and abuses of corporate power.
- Advocacy and campaigns: Supporting communities, unions, and NGOs in strategic campaigns for justice and regulation.
- Flagship initiatives: Recent focus areas include climate justice, regulation of big tech, and pharmaceutical sector accountability.

The main sectors under research by SOMO are the electronics, energy & water, minerals, agriculture & food, clothing, pharmaceuticals and the financial sectors. SOMO is governed as a foundation (stichting) and is run by a multidisciplinary team of researchers and policy experts. The center collaborates with hundreds of organizations globally and hosts and participates in numerous networks, such as GoodElectronics, OECD Watch, Lobbywatch, Mind the Gap Consortium, MVO Platform, and Tax Justice NL.

=== Documenting corporate complicity ===
SOMO has documented the involvement of European, and specifically Dutch, corporations and financial institutions in activities linked to Israel’s policies in the occupied Palestinian territories. SOMO has raised concerns about the role of European investors and companies in supplying goods, services, or financing that may contribute to violations of international law, including alleged war crimes. In particular, SOMO has reported on how Dutch pension funds and banks have held investments in Israeli companies operating in illegal settlements or providing military technologies used in operations in Gaza and the West Bank. Critics and human rights advocates have pointed to this corporate involvement as part of broader European complicity in what some international legal bodies and observers have described as Israel’s commission of crimes against humanity, including apartheid and, more recently, accusations of genocide.

== History ==
=== Establishment ===
In the early 1970s, large groups of Dutch people declared themselves in solidarity with the reform politics of the Chilean President Allende. At the time, the process of democratizing the Chilean economy was threatened by the manipulations of multinational - mainly American - corporations with interests in Chile. The violent overthrow of the Allende government in 1973 elicited mass fury against the multinationals. Several Third World organizations and sympathizers decided to establish a research bureau to monitor the activities and interests of these multinational companies. This led, in 1973, to the establishment of SOMO. Two of the organizations involved in setting up SOMO were X-Y Beweging and Sjaloom. X-Y and Sjaloom originally financed the wages and other costs of the first researcher. Later on, the growing SOMO organization was funded for many years partly by subsidies from NCO (now NCDO).

In its early days, SOMO’s main focus was on developing countries. However, from 1975 on, SOMO carried out research in support of workers in the Netherlands who were employed by multinational companies. SOMO provided publications and training for works councils and trade union executive groups of almost all the major multinationals which had their head offices in the Netherlands. Many SOMO employees acted as experts for works councils of Dutch companies during restructuring, mergers and reorganizations.

The rise of European Works Councils (EWCs) meant that – logically – SOMO had acquired a new, related, field of operation. Drawing up company profiles of multinational companies and providing support in setting up EWCs became a core field of SOMO in the 1980s and 1990s. Research into multinational companies and the business sectors dominated by them was also becoming an important field for research.

=== Change of focus ===
Since late 1990s, research work has focused primarily on the themes of Corporate Social Responsibility, labor relationships in developing countries and international trade and investment. Commissions are obtained via subsidies issued by the Dutch government and European government bodies. SOMO’s commissioning parties are trade unions, development organizations and other social organizations.

=== Establishing networks ===
The development of the internet is ensuring a wide availability of information, which has meant that the role of SOMO has changed since the 1990s. The added value of SOMO is, on the one hand, carrying out (or commissioning) research into production and labor conditions in various production chains, and on the other on strengthening cooperation between organizations which want to influence businesses and policymakers. By combining research and network coordination, SOMO wants to promote the integration of knowledge and action. SOMO coordinates various networks (CSR Platform, OECD Watch, Coalition for Trade and Development, GoodElectronics). SOMO also represents various consortia (makeITfair and Towards Tax Justice) and is also involved in the European Coalition for Corporate Justice (ECCJ) and Tax Justice Network NL. As an extension of its research and network coordination, SOMO is also focusing more and more on increasing the capacity of southern NGOs (by organizing workshops, training courses and developing research methods) and coordinating lobbying and influencing policy.

In the period 2005-2010, the focus was on working conditions and the environment in production sectors, along with initiatives covering economic themes, such as ‘tax justice’ and reforming the financial markets.

=== From 2010 ===
The intended objectives of SOMO were reformulated in 2010:

- The influence of social organizations on multinationals is growing.
- The policy and practice of businesses serve sustainable and social development.
- Government regulation is targeted at a fair distribution of prosperity and sustainability.

== See also ==
- Corporate accountability
- Economic justice
