= Kenneth Matiba =

Kenyan politician and activist

Kenneth Stanley Njindo Matiba Hon

Leader of Opposition
- In office 1992–1997
- President: Daniel arap Moi

Member of Parliament for Kiharu
- In office 1992–1997
- President: Daniel arap Moi

Minister of Transport and Communications
- In office 1983 – December 1988
- President: Daniel arap Moi

Minister of Health
- In office 1983–1988
- President: Daniel arap Moi

Minister of Culture and Social Services
- In office 1983–1988
- President: Daniel arap Moi

Member of Parliament for Mbiri
- In office 1979–1990
- President: Daniel arap Moi

Chairman of the Kenya Football Federation
- In office 1974–1978
- President: Jomo Kenyatta

Permanent Secretary for Commerce
- In office 1964–1968
- President: Jomo Kenyatta

Personal details
- Born: 1 June 1932 Murang'a, Kenya
- Died: 15 April 2018 (aged 85)
- Party: Saba Saba Asili
- Spouse: Edith Matiba
- Children: Susan Matiba; Raymond Matiba; Ivy Matiba; Julie Matiba; Gitau Matiba
- Education: Makerere University (BA in Sociology, Geography and History.)

Kenneth Stanley Njindo Matiba (1 June 1932 – 15 April 2018) was a Kenyan politician and an activist for democracy who came in at second place in the 1992 presidential election. In November 2007, he announced that he would stand as a presidential candidate in the December 2007 election, where he was placed seventh, with 8,046 votes.

== Early career ==
Matiba became a senior civil servant at age 31. Before Kenya attained its independence in December 1963, he became the first indigenous African Permanent Secretary for Education (in May of that year). Matiba was mentored by Carey Francis, headmaster of Alliance High School, who lobbied for his promotion to permanent secretary. In 1964, Matiba was appointed Permanent Secretary for Commerce under Minister Mwai Kibaki.

Matiba continued to succeed during the post-colonial period, helped by his connection to the Kiambu family of Musa Gitau, one of the first Africans to become a minister in the Kenyan Presbyterian Church (Matiba is Gitau's son-in-law). Gitau also influenced Jomo Kenyatta, having taught him at the PCEA Center, Thogoto, Kikuyu. In the patron-client reward system established by Kenyatta after independence, such connections were important to success in the public and private sectors. Matiba later left his civil-service career for one in the hospitality industry, establishing the Alliance Group of Hostels based on the South Coast. He also invested in exclusive private schools, including Hillcrest Preparatory (founded by Frank Thompson) and Hillcrest Secondary School.

Matiba was chairman of the Kenya Football Federation from 1974 to 1978, and was elected to the Kenyan Parliament in the 1983 general elections from the Mbiri Constituency (later renamed Kiharu) in the Muranga District. He served as Minister of Transport and Communications under the KANU administration led by President Daniel arap Moi, resigning in December 1988.

== Political activism ==
At Moi's behest, Matiba was held without trial at the Kamiti Maximum Security Prison in 1990 with Charles Rubia, a member of the Kenyan Cabinet who also called for multiparty democracy. While in prison Matiba was refused medication and suffered a stroke, which affected half his body and incapacitated him for some time. Later, a multiparty system was instituted and Matiba was released.

He was part of the opposition alliance forming the Forum for the Restoration of Democracy (FORD). During the December 1992 election, Matiba was the candidate representing FORD-Asili, a party he helped found in splintering from the original FORD. President Moi won the election on the KANU ticket; Matiba placed second, winning the Kiharu Constituency parliamentary seat in the concurrent parliamentary elections. He boycotted the December 1997 election (citing a lack of democracy), burning his voter's card. Matiba had a long-standing rivalry with Kenyan President Mwai Kibaki. Before the December 2002 election Matiba was leader of the minor Saba Saba Asili party, which declined to join the NARC coalition; however, he did not run for the presidency or a parliamentary seat.

In his later years, Matiba was dogged by ill-health stemming from his 1990 imprisonment. His business holdings also suffered, with his hotel chain being briefly taken into administration (although he regained control) and Hillcrest School sold by administrators (a case he legally contested). Matiba regained control of the school, which he later sold to a consortium led by Fanisi.

He founded The People newspaper. It began as a weekly in 1992, becoming a daily in 1998. However, it was a drain on Matiba's finances.

As of 2008, he remained chairman of Saba Saba Asili and re-registered as a voter.

== Personal life ==
In 2000 Matiba released his autobiography, Aiming High. As of 2010 he lived in Riara Ridge, Rironi (near Limuru), with his wife, Edith. Their son, Raymond Matiba, is a former chairman of the Kenya Tourist Board and the grangson is Richard "Astar" Njau.

Matiba died on 15 April 2018 at the Karen Hospital where he had been hospitalised for 55 days after experiencing cardiac arrest.
