= Forum for the Restoration of Democracy – Asili =

Political party in Kenya

Forum for Restoration of Democracy – Asili
- Founder: Kenneth Matiba
- Founded: 1991
- Split from: Forum for the Restoration of Democracy
- National affiliation: PNU

The Forum for the Restoration of Democracy–Asili (FORD–Asili) is a political party in Kenya. Asili means 'original' in Swahili. FORD-Asili has its origins in the original Forum for the Restoration of Democracy. In August 1992, the original FORD (Forum for the Restoration of Democracy) split into two factions. The Odinga-Wamalwa faction remained in the original Nairobi party headquarters at Agip House on Haile Selassie Avenue whilst the Matiba-Shikuku faction moved to Muthithi House on Muthithi Road in Westlands. Thus for a period prior to registration as independent parties, the two factions were known as FORD-Agip and FORD-Muthithi. FORD-Agip was registered as FORD-Kenya whilst FORD-Muthithi was registered as FORD-Asili. Both parties went on to field competitive presidential candidates in the December 1992 general elections. FORD-Asili's candidate Kenneth Matiba polled second to KANU's Daniel Toroitich arap Moi in 1992 and won 31 parliamentary seats, dominating Murang'a District in Central Province and garnering a credible portion of the votes in Eastern and Western Provinces. By 1997, Kenneth Matiba and Martin Shikuku disagreed on a number of matters resulting in Matiba's departure from the party, his destruction of his voter's card and refusal to stand in the 1997 Presidential Elections. Martin Shikuku therefore won the party's presidential nomination and went on to win only 0.6% of the Presidential Vote, with the party winning 1 National Assembly seat. In the 2002 election, Ford-Asili won 2 out of 212 elected seats and did not field a presidential candidate, choosing to support the successful NARC alliance candidate Mwai Kibaki. In 2007, Ford-Asili supported Mwai Kibaki again as presidential candidate, this time under the Party of National Unity banner and won a single parliamentary seat in its own right (Kirinyaga Central – John Kariuki). In the same election, the party's original presidential candidate Kenneth Matiba re-registered as a voter and stood under the Saba Saba-Asili banner (Saba Saba referring to 7 July 1990: the date of riots in Kenya to demand the return of multipartyism). Matiba came in 7th with only 0.081% of the vote.
