= Forum for the Restoration of Democracy =

Kenyan political party (1991–92)

Forum for the Restoration of Democracy was a political party and a movement against the one-party system in Kenya. It was founded in August 1991 by Oginga Odinga and others. However, it split before the 1992 General elections, the first multiparty elections held in Kenya.

The original FORD split into three political parties:

- Forum for the Restoration of Democracy-Asili
- Forum for the Restoration of Democracy-People
- Forum for the Restoration of Democracy-Kenya
