= Murang'a =

Town in Murang'a County, Kenya

Coordinates: 00°43′S 37°09′E

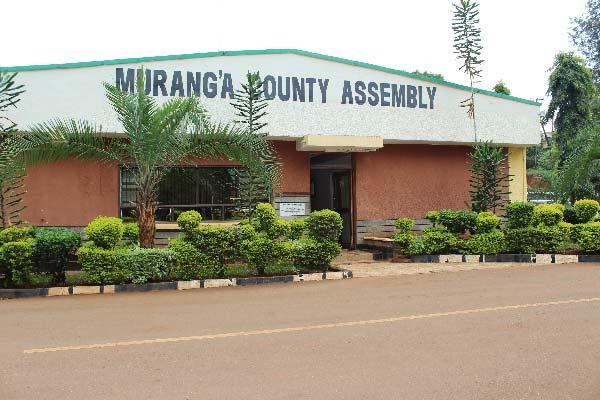
Murang'a County Headquarters

Muranga lies between Nairobi and Mount Kenya

Murang'a (previously Fort Hall) is a town in Murang'a County of Kenya. It is the administrative headquarters of Murang'a County and is mainly inhabited by the Kikuyu community. Fort Hall was originally a British colonial trading post and administrative centre established in the early 1900s during the colonial period in Kenya. It was named after a British colonial administrator Francis George Hall. The fort served as a strategic military and administrative hub in the region. Over time, the settlement around the fort grew into a town. After independence, Fort Hall was renamed to Murang'a. The Mau Mau insurrection was notably strong in the area.

According to the 2019 census, the town had a population of about 110,000.

== Overview ==
Murang'a is located between Nyeri and Thika. The town of Maragua is located 10 kilometres south of Murang'a while Sagana town is 15 kilometres northeast. It lies on a latitude of -0.7167 (0° 43’ South) and longitude of 37.1500 (37° 8’ East)

The town is low, hilly, small but picturesque with an altitude of between 4120 ft (1255 metres) to 4970 ft (1515 metres) above sea level. As a result of the varying altitudes, Murang'a can get quite cold from May to mid-August, and can experience hails. To the west of the town are the rolling Kikuyu farmlands that extend into the distance.

Murang'a is a fast-growing town that attracts traders and farmers from the neighbouring districts. It has banks, petrol stations, a post office, lodges, nightclubs playing the latest local and Western music, restaurants serving local and exotic dishes, supermarkets, dry cleaners, and lively marketplaces. It also has a relatively busy bus and matatu transportation terminal. A subcounty general hospital is located in the northern corner of the town. The town is accessible from Nairobi by Thika-Murang'a road and from Nyeri. Murang'a has a rich musical heritage, particularly in Kikuyu Benga music, with several prominent artists originating from the region. Odi Wa Muranga has been known for his energetic productions and is featured in various music videos and mixes. Some notable musicians from Murang'a include Joseph Kamaru, the late Queen Jane, John De Matthew, Daniel Kamau "DK", Joyce Wamama, Shiru ka Muranga and Simon Kihara, among others who have been influential figures in the Kikuyu music scene.

Murang'a County got its first governor in the year 2013 when H.E Mwangi Iria was elected on a TNA ticket to be the first constitutional governor.

There are several schools, including Murang'a High School.

== Climate ==
Murang'a has a tropical climate classified as Aw (tropical savanna climate), according to Köppen and Geiger, with a distinct dry winter season from June to August. During the winter season, there is a significant decrease in precipitation levels as compared to the summer months. The mean annual temperature amounts to 19.7 °C | 67.4 °F with an annual precipitation of approximately 996 mm | 39.2 inches. The region of Murang'a is characterised by a temperate climate, and the summer season presents some challenges in terms of precise categorisation. The driest month is February, with 21 mm | 0.8 inch of rainfall. The month of April experiences the highest amount of precipitation, with an average value of 213 mm | 8.4 inches.

== See also ==
- Railway stations in Kenya
- Murang'a High School
