= Tzipporah (name) =

Tzipporah, also written Tziporah, Tzipora, Tzippora, or Zipporah, is a given name from Hebrew (Hebrew: צפורה / צִפֹּרָה), literally meaning "bird". In modern Hebrew, it is sometimes shortened to Tzipi. In the Torah, Zipporah is the wife of Moses. Notable people with the name include:

- Zipporah Fish, Sidney AFL Women's player
- Zipporah Gathuya
- Zipporah Parks Hammond
- Tziporah Heller, American Haredi educator
- Tzipi Hotovely (born 1978), Israeli politician and diplomat
- Tzipora Jochsberger
- Zipporah Kittony
- Tzipora Laskov, Israeli nurse and politician
- Tzipi Livni (born 1958), Israeli politician
- Tziporah Malkah (born 1973), Australian model, actress, and TV host
- Zipporah Michelbacher Cohen
- Zipporah Nawa
- Tzipora Obziler, Israeli tennis player
- Zipporah Potter Atkins
- Tzippora Sharett (1896–1973), wife of Israeli Prime Minister Moshe Sharett
- Tzipi Shavit (born 1947), Israeli actress and comedian
- Zipporah Sein
- Zipporah Ritchie Woodward
