= John Obiero Nyagarama =

Kenyan politician (1946–2020)

His Excellency John Obiero Nyagarama

Governor of Nyamira County
- In office 27 March 2013 – 18 December 2020
- Deputy: Amos Nyaribo
- Succeeded by: Amos Nyaribo

Personal details
- Born: 1946 Nyakemincha, South Kavirondo District
- Died: 18 December 2020 (aged 73–74)
- Party: Orange Democratic Movement
- Spouse: Naomi Nyagarama
- Education: University of Nairobi
- Profession: Teacher; Farmer; Manager KTDA

Nyagarama (1946 – 18 December 2020), formally known as John Obiero Nyagarama, was a Kenyan politician. He was the first Governor of Nyamira County, deputised by Amos Nyaribo. He was a member of the Orange Democratic Movement and was elected in March 2013, subsequently retaining his seat for a second term beginning August 2017.

== Early life and education ==
Nyagarama was born in Nyakemincha, Nyamira, Nyamira County in 1946. He received his primary school education at Nyakemincha Primary School in West Mugirango Constituency. His O-levels were taken at Maseno School and his A-levels at Kisii High School. He then attended the University of Nairobi where he earned a bachelor's degree in English literature.

== Professional career ==
Nyamira County, Kenya

Having graduated from the University of Nairobi, Nyagarama worked as a teacher at Nduru Boys Secondary School from 1975 to 1976. He then taught at Nyansiongo Boys High School until 1978, when he transferred to Menyenya High School. He was among the first to teach there and stayed for a period of four years. He later stopped teaching and began farming, focusing on tea production. He joined the Kenya Tea Development Agency (KTDA) as a management trainee and eventually became a manager in various KTDA branches countrywide. He was managing director of the privately owned Sotik Tea Factory from 1991 to 1992.

Leaving tea farming, Nyagarama joined Touchline Press Limited, a private publishing company, as its chief executive officer, before going on to establish a tea export company in Mombasa, Kenya in 1993. In 1994, he was elected to serve on the KTDA's board as a director representing the tea zones of Marani, in Kisii County, and certain centers within Nyamira County. He continued to hold various roles for the KTDA from 1994 to 2013. He also served as the chairman of Kenya Tea Packers Limited (KETEPA) between 1996 and 2002, and was among the founders of the Chai Trading Company in 2011, serving as chairman until his resignation in 2013 to pursue a political career.

== Political career ==
Nyagarama ran for the parliamentary seat of West Mugirango Constituency, Nyamira County in the general elections of December 2007, but was unsuccessful. On 4 March 2013 he became a candidate for the governorship of Nyamira County, running on the Orange Democratic Movement ticket, which he won. He was sworn into office on 27 March 2013. In August 2017, he won a second term in a tight race against James Gesami and Walter Nyambati, the latter a former Member of Parliament from Kitutu Masaba.

== Death ==
On 15 December 2020, he was placed on life support at The Nairobi Hospital after testing positive for COVID-19 during the COVID-19 pandemic in Kenya and suffering multiple lung failures. Three days later, on December 18, he died from the virus. He is to be succeeded by the deputy governor, Amos Nyaribo.

== Governor of Nyamira County ==
As Governor of Nyamira County, with approval from the Nyamira County Assembly, he appointed the following in 2017:

- John Omanwa as the Executive County Member for Transport, Roads and Public Works
- Gladys Momanyi as the Executive County Member for Education and Vocational Training
- Zablon Onchiri as the Executive County Member for Lands, Housing and Physical Planning
- Samwel Maiko as the Executive County Member for Environment, Energy, Mining and Natural Resources
- Peris N. Mong’are as the Executive County Member for Agriculture, Livestock and Fisheries
- Douglas Bosire as the Executive County Member for Health Services
