= Eva Njenga =

Kenyan physician

- Born: Kenya
- Education: University of Nairobi (Bachelor of Medicine and Bachelor of Surgery), (Master of Medicine in Internal Medicine); Harvard University (Certificate in Medical Anthropology), (Certificate in Social Medicine); Newcastle University Medical School (Advanced Post Graduate Course in Endocrinology)
- Occupations: Physician, Endocrinologist Medical Administrator
- Years active: 1999 — present
- Known for: Professional competence
- Title: Chairman of the Kenya Medical Practitioners and Dentists Board

Eva Wangechi Mubia Njenga is a Kenyan consultant physician and endocrinologist, who serves as the Chairperson of the Kenya Medical Practitioners and Dentists Board, the professional body that regulates medical doctors and dentists practicing in the country. She was appointed to that position on 10 April 2019, being the first female in the history of Kenya, to serve in that role.

== Background and education ==
Njenga holds a Bachelor of Medicine and Bachelor of Surgery degree and a Master of Medicine degree in Internal Medicine, both from the University of Nairobi. She also has a Certificate in Medical Anthropology and a Certificate in Social Medicine, both awarded by Harvard University in the United States. In addition, she holds an Advanced Post Graduate Course in Endocrinology, obtained from Newcastle University Medical School, in the United Kingdom.

== Career ==
Njenga has previously worked at Kenyatta National Hospital, the largest public referral hospital in Kenya. She has also worked at Nakuru County Hospital and at Joslin Diabetes Center in Boston, Massachusetts, United States. She currently maintains a private endocrinology consultancy medical practice in the central business district of Nairobi, Kenya's capital city. At her new position, she replaced Professor George Magoha, who was appointed Cabinet Secretary of Education in the Kenya's cabinet.

== Other considerations ==
She is a member of several professional bodies and associations, including the American Diabetes Association, Kenya, Kenya Medical Association and Kenya Association of Physicians. She serves on the executive board of the Kenya Diabetes Association and is the Chairperson of Kenya Diabetes Study Group and is the former Vice Chairman of the Kenya Medical Women Association. She has also served and the Chairman of the Diabetes Management & Information Centre and a former member of the Pharmacy and Poisons Board of Kenya.

== See also ==
- Health in Kenya
