= Christian Medical and Dental Associations =

United States medical organization

Christian Medical & Dental Associations®
- Formation: 1931
- Type: Professional Association
- Headquarters: Bristol, Tennessee
- Location: United States
- Members: 19,000
- Official language: English
- President: Gloria M. Halverson, MD
- Key people: Mike Chupp, MD, FACS, FCS (ECSA) (CEO)
- Staff: 75
- Website: https://cmda.org/

The Christian Medical & Dental Associations (CMDA) is a professional association of physicians and dentists, with two constituent bodies, the Christian Medical Association and the Christian Dental Association. As of 2018, CMDA had over 19,000 members. It is the United States affiliate of the International Christian Medical and Dental Association.

The membership consists of physicians, dentists, and other allied health professionals. CMDA "sponsors overseas medical mission projects, provides members with a network for fellowship and professional growth, finances student campus ministries in medical and dental schools, publishes educational/inspirational materials, hosts marriage and family conferences, offers continuing education for missionary doctors, and develops overseas academic exchange programs". In addition, "Christian Medical & Dental Associations (CMDA) works on 270 medical/dental school campuses with over five thousand students."

Members of the Christian Medical & Dental Associations are from diverse religious movements, such as evangelicalism, in addition to several Christian denominations including Anabaptists, Anglicans, Baptists, Catholics, Irvingians, Lutherans, Methodists, Moravians, Orthodox, Presbyterians, Quakers, Reformed, and Waldensians, as well as nondenominational Christians.

== Public policy ==
The Christian Medical Association's Washington office provides a national voice for members on public policy issues such as health care, conscience rights, human trafficking, international health, abortion, HIV-AIDS, sexual orientation/gender identity, human cloning, abstinence, stem cell research, assisted suicide, among other issues.

The Washington office links members with Congress, the White House, federal agencies and policy organizations; provides congressional testimony; presents pro-life perspectives through the national media; and publishes resources on vital issues.

The Washington office also directs the Freedom2Care coalition of over 50 organizations to advance conscience rights in health care.

== See also ==
- American Scientific Affiliation (US)
- Christian Legal Society (US)
- Christian Medical and Dental Fellowship of Australia (Oceania)
- Christian Medical Association of India (Hindustan)
- Christian Medical and Dental Society (Canada)
- Christian Medical Fellowship (UK)
- Christians in Science (UK)
- Society of Ordained Scientists (International)
- The BioLogos Foundation (International)
- The Veritas Forum (International)
