= Obiero =

Obiero is a surname. Notable people with the surname include:

- John Obiero Nyagarama (1946–2020), Kenyan politician
- Mercy Obiero (born 1978), Kenyan weightlifter
- Micah Obiero (born 2001), English footballer
