= Mogaka =

Mogaka is a Kenyan surname. Notable people with the surname include:

- Evans Mogaka (born 1949), Kenyan long-distance runner
- Fred Mogaka Tumbo (born 1978), Kenyan long-distance runner
- Irene Mogaka (born 1985), Kenyan long-distance runner
- Stephen K. Mogaka, Kenyan lawyer and MP
