= Ayub Gitau =

Kenyan academic and university administrator

Ayub Njoroge Gitaū

9th Vice Chancellor of the University of Nairobi
- Incumbent
- Assumed office 14 May 2026
- Preceded by: Margaret J. Hutchinson

Personal details
- Born: 20 October 1966 (age 59)

Ayub Njoroge Gìtaū is a Kenyan academic, engineer, and university administrator serving as the 9th Vice-Chancellor of the University of Nairobi. He is a professor of Agricultural and Biosystems Engineering and has held several academic and administrative positions at the university, including Dean of the Faculty of Engineering and Acting Deputy Vice-Chancellor for Academic Affairs.

== Education ==
Gìtaū studied Agricultural Engineering at the University of Nairobi. He obtained a Master of Science degree in Agricultural Engineering in 1996 and later earned a Doctor of Philosophy degree in Agricultural Engineering in 2005.

== Career ==
Gìtaū joined the University of Nairobi as a lecturer in the Department of Environmental and Biosystems Engineering in 2002. He was promoted to Senior Lecturer in 2008, Associate Professor in 2015, and full Professor in 2023. Between 2011 and 2017, he served as Chair of the Department of Environmental and Biosystems Engineering. In 2017, he became Acting Dean of the School of Engineering before his appointment as substantive Dean of the Faculty of Engineering in 2019. In August 2024, he was appointed Acting Deputy Vice-Chancellor for Academic Affairs at the University of Nairobi. On 14 May 2026, the University Council appointed him as the 9th substantive Vice-Chancellor of the University of Nairobi following a prolonged leadership crisis at the institution.

== Professional affiliations ==
He is also a registered consulting engineer with the Engineers Board of Kenya.

== See also ==
- University of Nairobi
- Margaret J. Hutchinson
