= Nightlight Christian Adoptions =

American nonprofit organization

- Nightlight Christian Adoptions
- Type: Nonprofit
- Founded: 1959
- Headquarters: U.S.
- Number of locations: California, Colorado, Florida, Georgia, Indiana, Kentucky, Missouri, Oklahoma, South Carolina, Texas (January 2017)
- Area served: United States, Taiwan, Kyrgyzstan, Latvia, Nicaragua, Panama, Uganda, Ukraine, United Kingdom, Bulgaria, Colombia, Romania, Haiti, Hong Kong, Albania, Ghana, India, Nigeria and China.
- Key people: Daniel Nehrbass, President
- Services: Adoption agency, adoption counseling, embryo adoption
- Website: nightlight.org

Nightlight Christian Adoptions is an American nonprofit, Hague-accredited, pro-life licensed adoption agency that counsels pregnant women and arranges adoptions. Founded in 1959, it has locations in ten U.S. states and arranges adoptions both domestically and internationally. Nightlight was the first agency beginning in 1995 to organize a tour of the United States by a group of orphaned Russian children. In 1997, it created the first program in the United States to arrange for couples to adopt frozen embryos.

== Founding and purpose ==
Nightlight is a licensed non-profit Hague accredited adoption agency that provides pro-life counseling to pregnant women and adoption services to families. They coordinate adoptions both in the United States and internationally. They also facilitate adoption of frozen embryos and provide humanitarian assistance to children in orphanages.

Nightlight was founded in 1959 by a group of evangelical Christian churches with the purpose of addressing the needs of women in unplanned pregnancy. At the time, the name of the agency was Evangelical Welfare Agency. The agency was later called Christian Adoption and Family Services. In 1994, Ron Stoddart, a California adoption attorney, assumed leadership.

The agency changed its name to Nightlight Christian Adoptions and has offices in multiple states. It arranges adoptions within the United States and from twelve foreign countries. In 1995 Nightlight was the first agency to bring a group of Russian orphan children to the United States on a tour to help increase awareness of older children's adoption needs.

Daniel Nehrbass became Executive Director in May 2012.

== History and programs ==
Nightlight Christian Adoptions was established in the 1950s as the Evangelical Welfare Agency, an organization founded by evangelical churches to facilitate adoption placements. The organization subsequently adopted the name Nightlight Christian Adoptions.

== Adoptions ==
=== International adoptions ===
Nightlight has been involved in international adoptions in multiple countries. The organization has successfully helped over 1000 families adopt children from countries overseas, with the largest number coming from Russia. Fees for an international adoption can be as much as $49,000. To help adoptive families, the company "created a $50,000 scholarship fund. The monies are available to help prospective adopting parents wanting to adopt eligible children; but who may not have the financial resources available to do so."

Some adoptees express their gratitude for the success they have found in their new homes. Oleg Parent was rescued from a dangerous home in Russia. He became a star football player in his high school and tattooed his adoptive mother's name on his calf.

Nightlight also provides international adoption services. In July 2026, The Colorado Sun reported that the organization was licensed for international adoption services in Colorado and 11 other states and handled approximately 10 percent of international adoptions in the United States, according to the agency's president, Dan Nehrbass.

The report discussed declining international adoption numbers, changes in adoption policies in countries of origin, and the effects of regulatory requirements and immigration processing delays. Nehrbass attributed part of the decline to increasing procedural barriers, while other adoption professionals interviewed for the article emphasized the importance of safeguards against trafficking and efforts to prioritize domestic placements in children's countries of origin.

In March 2023, the United States Department of State announced the renewal of Nightlight's intercountry adoption accreditation, effective through March 27, 2027.

=== International adoption during the COVID-19 pandemic ===
Nightlight Christian Adoptions was among the American adoption agencies affected by international travel restrictions and government processing delays during the COVID-19 pandemic. In June 2020, Christianity Today reported on families working with Nightlight to complete adoptions from Haiti and other countries. The report described delays involving international courts, embassies, travel restrictions, and immigration documentation. Nightlight president Daniel Nehrbass criticized delays in international adoption processing, while acknowledging that restrictions imposed by foreign governments also contributed to the difficulties.

In December 2020, Voice of America reported that international adoptions from China remained suspended despite the resumption of adoption processing in some other countries. Nightlight representative Rebecca Tolson stated that the agency had typically completed approximately 20 adoptions from China annually in preceding years, compared with only two completed cases during 2020. Nightlight was among the agencies advocating for procedures that would allow pending adoptions to proceed while maintaining COVID-19 health precautions.

=== Native American adoption ===
In 2009, Nightlight was contacted by Christina Maldonado who wanted to place her unborn child for adoption. Maldonado had been engaged to Dusten Brown in December 2008, and she became pregnant in January 2009. Brown asked her to marry him sooner than they had planned, but he refused to provide any support until they were married. Maldonado decided to put the child up for adoption.

The Indian Child Welfare Act requires that the tribe must be notified when a Native American child is adopted outside the tribe. Maldonado thought that Brown might be a Cherokee Indian, and Maldanado's attorney contacted the Cherokee Nation to determine whether he was an enrolled member, but their letter misspelled Brown's name and provided an incorrect date of birth. As a result, the tribe could not verify if Brown was formally enrolled and took no action on the pending adoption.

The agency helped Maldonado to arrange for Matt and Melanie Capobianco of South Carolina to adopt her child. Four months later the Capobianco's attorney notified them that the biological father was seeking custody. Attorneys for the Cherokee Nation got involved a few months later. Maldonado's attorneys later argued that she did know he was a Native American and that he had never invited her to take part in tribal customs, events, or food. Brown and his new wife gained custody of the infant.

Court records show that Brown had previously testified that he was willing to surrender his paternal rights if he "would not be responsible in any way for child support or anything else as far as the child's concerned." The case went to the United States Supreme Court which ruled against Brown. A South Carolina court finalized the adoption and the Oklahoma Supreme Court ruled on September 23, 2013, that it did not have jurisdiction over Veronica. Brown and his wife returned Veronica to her adoptive parents on September 24.

== Embryo adoption program ==
In vitro fertilization has become an increasingly popular choice for infertile couples. The process harvests a donor woman's eggs which are then fertilized in a laboratory using a donor male's sperm. Fertile embryos are then implanted in the woman who will carry the embryo to term. But the process results in a number of fertile embryos that are never used. Couples have the choice to allow them to thaw and perish, allow the eggs to be used for research, donate them to another infertile couple, or keep them in cold storage. It costs up to $1,200 a year to store frozen embryos.

The Catholic Church has stated that frozen embryos have a right to life even before they are implanted in a woman's uterus. It opposes in vitro fertilization but it has not issued a formal statement on embryo adoption, although it discourages the practice due to its close connection to in vitro fertilization.

Individuals have differing opinions about the beginning of human personhood and whether the embryos have the potential to become a person. Stoddart and Nightlight believe that life begins when the embryo is created. According to a survey by the American Society for Reproductive Medicine, 54% of fertility patients want to preserve their remaining embryos for future use. Another 21% want to donate leftover embryos for research. Donating embryos for research may be a good alternative when patients receive proper, honest and clear information about the research project, the procedures and the scientific value of the research. The remaining 7% of those surveyed are willing to donate leftover embryos to another couple.

Dr. Jeffrey Nelson is Director of the Huntington Reproductive Center, one of California's largest IVF clinics. He reports that "Twenty-five per cent of patients want to donate their [spare] embryos – not as many as I'd like." He added, "People tend to hold on to their embryos because they don't want to make a decision. We started buying more and more cryopreservation tanks, and we finally had to say that there's a fee for a certain number of years' storage, and beyond that the price starts to escalate." As of May 2012, there were about 600,000 frozen embryos stored in laboratories and fertility clinics, costing the donor families about $72 million annually for storage fees.

=== Origins ===
In 1997, after Stoddart heard a radio show talking about British frozen embryos being destroyed, Nightlight established an embryo "adoption" (Note: Lawyers manage the process as a property transfer and describe the term "embryo adoption" as a misnomer because adoption laws do not apply to the legal transfer of an embryo. Abortion rights advocates, advocates of embryonic stem cell research, and members of the fertility industry object to referring to the transfer as an "adoption" because they feel it gives an embryo the same status as a child. Doctors describe the process as "embryo donation".) program to enable infertile couples to gain access to frozen embryos. Nightlight describes the process as an "adoption" because they match embryo donors with recipients using practices commonly used in traditional adoptions. The U.S. Health and Human Services agency has given grants to Nightlights's Snowflakes program and others to promote "embryo adoption."

Until Stoddart conceived of his program, embryo transfer was typically arranged by medical doctors, but Stoddart hoped positioning the transfer as an adoption would increase the number of embryos implanted in women and brought to term. The process is considerably less expensive than standard adoption, costing about $9,500.

In July 2022, The Christian Post reported that more than 950 children had been born through Nightlight's Snowflakes embryo adoption program, according to figures supplied by the organization. The report examined the program's operations, its relationship with fertility clinics, and ethical disagreements among Christian organizations concerning embryo donation and in vitro fertilization. The article included interviews with Nightlight representatives and critics of embryo adoption.

=== U.S. Embryo Adoption program ===
Nightlight operates the Snowflakes Embryo Adoption program, which facilitates the donation of cryopreserved embryos to recipient families. The program uses adoption-style procedures, including family matching and home studies, although embryo donation is legally distinct from the adoption of a child.

In March 2023, The Colorado Sun reported that approximately 1,000 children had been born through the Snowflakes program. The newspaper examined the program's history, matching practices, eligibility requirements and religious foundations.

A May 2023 report in The Philadelphia Inquirer described a Pennsylvania family's experience with Snowflakes, including the matching process, home study requirements and communication between genetic and recipient families.

In June 2024, the Associated Press examined embryo adoption among Christian families in the context of legal and ethical debates surrounding in vitro fertilization. The report discussed Nightlight's Snowflakes program and included comments from program executive Elizabeth Button.

The program was also featured in a June 2024 report by Indianapolis television station WRTV, which documented a family's experience using Snowflakes.

The U.S. Department of Health and Human Services funded an Embryo Adoption Awareness Campaign beginning in 2002. In 2013 the program had a $1.9 million budget. From 2011 to 2012, the number of embryo adoptions rose 25% in the U.S. As of January 2013, more than 4500 babies have been born in the U.S. through embryo adoption. A total of about 1,900 babies were born between 2004 and 2009 as a result of the program. Of those, more than 300 have been born since 1997 through Nightlight's Snowflake embryo adoption program. The Obama administration removed funding for the embryo donation awareness program from its budget in 2013 due to "limited interest" from a "very small pool of applicants, many of whom are repeat recipients."

Various studies show that the percentage of frozen embryos that survive after they are unfrozen varies from one-sixth to about three fourths. According to a 2003 study by the American Society for Reproductive Medicine only 2 percent of frozen embryos are actually donated. Other studies have shown that the government grants to improve embryo adoption awareness has led to drastic cuts in the amount Americans are paying for indefinite storage of embryos.

=== Nightlight donation program ===
Nightlight established the first program that organized the adoption of embryo in 1997. It was one of several organizations that received funding from the Health and Human Services to increase awareness of the opportunity to adopt frozen embryos. Nightlight received a $500,000 grant that it used to produce promotional videos targeting strongly religious, middle-class couples.

The campaign has successfully influenced public opinion: according to Stoddart, then director, a 2009 survey "asked what should be done with remaining embryos. Most respondents said that the embryos should be donated to other infertile couples (68.8 percent) rather than being destroyed (5.9 percent) or being donated for research."

Those donating embryos through Nightlight's Snowflake program can designate that only Christian families may receive them. Most embryos have been received by Christian families who pledged to raise the child born in a "constructive, wholesome and spiritual home environment."

Stoddart has worked to publicize the issue of frozen embryos in storage, believing it would increase the number of donations. In 2005, Stoddart and Lori Maze, the director of the Snowflakes Frozen Embryo Adoption Program, were recognized by President George W. Bush for their work in transferring frozen embryos to infertile couples. In his biography Decision Points, President Bush wrote that increasing support for embryo adoption, and specifically Nightlight's Snowflake program, had a profound place in his legacy as president.

=== Open adoptions ===
Asked why a three-day-old blastocyst should be subject to the same adoptive process as a baby, Nightlight Executive Director Daniel Nehrbass said, "We have learnt over the past 100 years that every child not raised by its biological parents will eventually start looking for them, Now we're repeating the mistake with assisted reproduction because we're creating a new set of anonymous parents through sperm and now embryo donation." For this reason Nightlight encourages "open adoption," allowing an adopted child to grow up knowing who its biological parents are. Nightlight believes that an open adoption model gives parents of donor embryos increased confidence in the family adopting their frozen embryos. The majority of clinics do not offer open embryo donation to their patients or the recipients.

== Public discussion and ethical debates ==
Nightlight's Snowflakes program has been discussed in broader debates concerning embryo donation, reproductive ethics and access to in vitro fertilization. In June 2025, The Guardian examined the relationship between embryo adoption programs, evangelical Christian beliefs about embryos and proposals to extend legal personhood to embryos. The report discussed Snowflakes within the context of differing perspectives on embryo donation and reproductive rights.

=== Stem cell lawsuit ===
In 2006, President George W. Bush vetoed increased funding for embryonic stem cell research. Three years later, on March 9, 2009, President Barack Obama reversed that decision and issued Executive Order 13505 allowing the research to go forward. In August 2009, Nightlight, along with two researchers, two potential couples for embryo donation, the embryos themselves, and the Christian Medical Association filed a lawsuit in the D.C. District Court to block the research. On Oct. 27, 2009, Judge Royce C. Lamberth dismissed the suit, ruling that none of the plaintiffs had standing to bring the case. On appeal to the D.C. Circuit Court the decision was reversed in part. The two researchers were held to have standing, while Nightlight and the others did not. On August 23, 2010, Lamberth issued a preliminary injunction against the Federal government conducting stem cell research.

Scientists immediately objected to the ruling, stating that it would do "irreparable harm" to the field. In September 2010, the D.C. Circuit Court temporarily lifted the injunction, finding that the plaintiff was unlikely to prevail at trial. The scientific community reacted positively, stating that this would allow potentially critical, life-saving research to proceed. The Coalition for the Advancement of Medical Research, the most vocal advocate of using regenerative medicine to cure disease, said the ruling sent a message that "frivolous" suits against scientific research would not be tolerated. In April 2011, Lamberth's injunction was formally reversed by the U.S. Court of Appeals.

=== Record-setting embryo donation ===
In July 2025, an Ohio couple, Lindsey and Tim Pierce, welcomed a son, Thaddeus, following the transfer of an embryo that had been cryopreserved for nearly 31 years. The embryo had originally been frozen in 1994 and was donated through Nightlight Christian Adoptions' Snowflakes program. The birth was reported by the Associated Press as a record for the longest period of embryo storage resulting in a live birth.

Guinness World Records subsequently documented the birth and reported that Nightlight's Open Hearts program helped match the donated embryos with the recipient couple. The program facilitates placements involving embryos that may be difficult to match because of their age or other characteristics.

ABC News Australia also covered the birth, reporting on Snowflakes' donor-matching process and the role of donor preferences in selecting recipient families.

== Orphanage work ==
Nightlight has partnered with the Heart of a Child agency in Kampala, Uganda, to fund an orphanage for infants. It has organized tours of orphaned youth to the United States where they can meet with prospective adoptive parents. In 1995, they were the first agency to organize a tour for older orphaned Russian children to the United States. They have conducted the tours annually in partnership with Detsky Dom Partners, later renamed Every Child Has a Name, bringing over 500 children from Russia, Ukraine, Kyrgyzstan, and Taiwan to the United States. Nightlight says their goal is to "expose the children to American culture and to raise awareness of the needs of older Russian children" waiting for adoption.

=== Foster care services ===
Nightlight Christian Adoptions provides foster care recruitment and support services in addition to its domestic, international and embryo adoption programs. In September 2024, Indianapolis television station WRTV reported on Nightlight's efforts to recruit foster parents in Indiana, approximately one year after the agency launched foster care services in the state. The report included interviews with Nightlight staff concerning the shortage of available foster families and the organization's recruitment efforts.

== Financial ==
During 2011, Nightlight received donations of $712,142 and other revenue totaling $2,119,264. Their net assets totalled $521,222. Nightlight adheres to the standards of the Evangelical Council on Financial Accountability.

== Reviews ==
As of January 2014, Nightlight had received an average 3.7 star rating (out of 5) by one website that offers individual reviews of adoption agencies. Some reviews posted by adoptive parents were extremely positive, while others were very negative. The negative reviews in some cases referred to the controversial adoptions previously described, to badly prepared paperwork, and to the sometimes difficult work of placing children from foreign countries with families in the United States. The Better Business Bureau of Colorado and Wyoming in January 2014 had no record of complaints against the company and had insufficient information to provide a rating, while the BBB serving San Diego, Orange and Imperial Counties showed only a single, closed issue with "Problems with Product/Service" during the prior three years.
