= Julie Overbaugh =

American virologist

- Born: Pennsylvania, USA

Academic background
- Education: BS, chemistry, 1979, University of Connecticut; Ph.D., Biochemistry, 1983, University of Colorado Boulder
- Thesis: Microbial glutathoine peroxidases and transferases (1983)

Julie M. Overbaugh is an American virologist. She is a professor at the Fred Hutchinson Cancer Research Center. Overbaugh is best known for her translational approach to studying HIV transmission and pathogenesis and studies of how the antibody response evolves to recognize viruses. Her work in maternal and infant HIV transmission helped make clear the risk posed by breastfeeding and highlighted unique characteristics of an infant immune response that could inform vaccine development. Major scientific contributions to the understanding of HIV transmission and pathogenesis also include: identifying a bottleneck that selects one or a few variants during HIV transmission; demonstrating the importance of female hormones in HIV infection risk; showing the HIV reinfection is common; demonstrating a role for antibodies that mediate ADCC in clinical disease; showing that HIV infected infants develop unique neutralizing antibody responses to HIV.

Overbaugh is an elected member of the National Academy of Sciences and the American Academy of Arts and Sciences. In addition to being recognized for her scientific contributions, she is also recognized for her mentoring, her advocacy for equity and her commitment to global health.

== Early life and education ==
Overbaugh was born and raised in Pennsylvania and graduated from Delone Catholic High School in 1975. During high school, she captained their basketball and field hockey teams and received an award for Excellence in Athletics.

Following high school, Overbaugh was recruited to play college basketball for the University of Connecticut's Huskies from 1976 to 1978. During her tenure, she averaged 3.5 points in 46 games, and also played varsity tennis and served as team captain during her final year. She graduated with a Bachelor of Science degree in chemistry in 1979 and earned her PhD in chemistry from the University of Colorado Boulder. During her PhD, Overbaugh spent four months in Oklahoma aiding the effort to ratify the Equal Rights Amendment. She returned to school to complete her PhD and continued her training as a postdoctoral fellow in interdisciplinary programs in health and cancer biology at the Harvard T.H. Chan School of Public Health from 1983 to 1987. During her fellowship, she became interested in HIV research because it was a "clear intersection of science and public health and medicine."

== Career ==
Following her fellowship, Overbaugh joined the University of Washington (UW) to expand their HIV research program to include a basic science focus. In 1992, she became a member of the Nairobi HIV/STD Research Project, which included collaborating on a study of HIV mother-infant infection. For this, she joined Joan Kreiss and Ruth W. Nduati in Kenya to understand the risk of HIV transmission through breastfeeding. The research team found that breastfeeding doubled the risk of HIV transmission from mother to child. Her subsequent studies showed that the levels of virus in breastmilk predicted infection risk.

Overbaugh left the UW in 1999 to join the Fred Hutchinson Cancer Research Center where she continued and expanded her studies of HIV transmission and pathogenesis, including working closely with the Kenya research collaborative team.. That year Overbaugh received an Elizabeth Glaser Scientist award to expand her studies of mother-infant transmission of HIV to better understand how features of the virus and immune response impact infant infection risk. They went on to define immune factors that impact transmission in the setting of infant exposure, particularly a role for non-neutralizing antibodies that mediated cell killing in infant infection and disease Her research team also discovered novel aspects of the infected infant's immune response to HIV and isolated and characterized the first HIV neutralizing antibodies from infants. They also discovered a variant of HIV in an infant, BG505, that has been extensively leveraged for studies of HIV structure and for vaccine development.

Overbaugh's research has also focused on understanding how viral evolution impacts disease and she showed that the viruses that evolve over the course of infection are more pathogenic, in part because they have escaped neutralizing antibody control. Her work also highlighted that retroviruses can evolve to change their entry receptors and by so doing, can infect new cells and cause changes in disease outcomes. She also discovered that HIV adapted in cell culture can use more diverse receptor othologues, and that this adaption makes strains used in model system distinct In her very early work, Overbaugh also studied adaptive evolution.

Her work with the Kenya research collaborative team also included expanding studies with Kreiss to better define the basis of transmission in high-risk women, such as sex workers, work that continues to this day in Mombasa, Kenya. There, a focus of her research has been on the early dynamics of infection. Her group showed that despite chronically infected people having many distinct viral variants of HIV, there was the transmission of just one or a few of these variants, indicating a bottleneck in viruses that are transmitted. They went on to show that the transmission bottleneck is influenced by his factors such as hormonal contraceptives and sexually transmitted diseases. Her group further showed that transmission can also occur in the face of an existing infection, leading to re-infection, and her team has studied the setting of re-infection to understand immune correlates of protection to inform vaccine efforts.

Overbaugh was also involved with collaborated studies to define antibody escape pathways for HIV antibodies and the molecular determinants that govern HIV entry into host cells. Her lab went on to develop a method to profile escape called Phage-DMS that has been used for studies of HIV and SARS-CoV-2.

Due to her interest in infectious disease of global health importance, Overbaugh also emphasized the development of methods for detecting infections in her work. Because HIV strains in Africa differed from those in the US, she developed methods to detect infection with those strains and helped validate assays to define the levels of infection. More recently, she extended this approach to develop methods for detecting antibodies to SARS-CoV-2.

=== Major awards ===
Overbaugh received the Elizabeth Glaser Scientist Award for her work in pediatric HIV research in 1999. In 2011, Overbaugh was named FierceBiotech's 2011 Women in Biotech and was elected to the American Society for Microbiology. Later that year, Overbaugh received the Marion Spencer Fay Leadership Award Drexel University’s Institute for Women's Health and Leadership. In 2016, she also received the lifetime achievement Nature Award for Mentoring in Science and was the first US-Based scientists to be recognized with this award. Two years later, she was recognized for her long service to the global fight against HIV with the Field's Memorial Lecture at the opening session of the Conference on Retroviruses and Opportunistic Infections. As a result of her studies of HIV transmission and pathogenesis in affected cohorts, including African women and children, she was elected a Fellow of the American Academy of Arts and Sciences. She was also elected a Member of the National Academy of Sciences for her studies of HIV transmission and pathogenesis in affected cohorts, including African women and children; she is the first Seattle-based virologist to be elected to the prestigious NAS.

=== Mentoring ===
Overbaugh has been recognized in various ways for her mentoring and her commitment to launching the careers of the next generation of scientists. Her mentoring awards include both local and international recognition. She established a training program for graduate students to support training in the study of viral diseases and how viruses evolve even before the COVID pandemic highlighted the need to such training. Her trainees have taken a variety of position in academia, government, industry and a broader range of areas. In academia. Her former trainees have taken faculty positions at Baylor, Columbia, Emory, Harvard, Stanford U Michigan, U Washington, and other Universities focused on research and/or teaching. Former trainees have also attained positions in global health, at the Gates Foundation, the African Academy of Sciences, and in government at the CDC and NIH and the Kenya Medical Research Institute, Other trainees have secured roles in science policy and diversity and inclusion offices and some have written novels with a science focus.

=== Contributions to the Practice of Science ===
Overbaugh has actively contributed to improving the practice of science. She has written about effective mentoring from the perspective of a highly productive scientist who has also garnered multiple mentoring awards. She is also well recognized for having a lab that supports work-life balance and as a result, the journal Nature solicited a commentary on this topic. There she highlighted “there must be room for those who want that balance, otherwise creative people with the potential to make significant contributions to scientific discovery will be excluded”. She has written about differences in publication rates in high-profile journals based on gender and argued for better tracking to improve this imbalance. She also has lectured on the practice of peer-review in ethics forums having served as Chair of NIH grant review panels and as Journal editor.

=== Advocacy for broad representation and inclusion of underrepresented groups in science ===
Overbaugh has been a strong advocate for representation in science during her career. Overbaugh was the founding faculty lead for Hutch United, a grass roots effort established in 2013 and led by trainees to help promote the success of underrepresented groups in science and those who otherwise felt on the fringes. In her role as senior vice president and director of the Office of Education and Training at the Fred Hutch, she helped oversee efforts to create a more representative scientific workforce, she served as advocate for this in science at all levels and helped provide support for new faculty launching their careers. Overbaugh has published papers in scientific journals pointing out gender bias in the review process.

Overbaugh has published more than 160 peer-reviewed publications with African co-authors, and has mentored numerous African scientists for periods ranging from short-term technical training to masters and PhD level training. Her citation for the Nature Mentorship Award calls out her strengths mentoring African scientists: "She has the patience to listen to and deal with culture shocks and adjustment to new surroundings and a different system of training and education."

Overbaugh's place as a role model and mentor for underrepresented groups in science has been recognized in multiple other ways including by the University of Washington School of Medicine in 2007. Her leadership was also highlighted in the introductory remarks ahead of her honorary opening lecture at the premiere meeting in the HIV field. There it was noted that she has a reputation as a ‘proponent for women’s rights’. In that lecture, Overbaugh highlighted her collaborative and bilateral research with Kenyan partners and emphasized her view of the importance of supporting training of aspiring African scientists.

=== Leadership and institutional recognition ===
Overbaugh has served in numerous leadership roles in the field nationally and internationally, including chair of NIH grant review panels on both HIV molecular biology and HIV immunology, as Chair of the Burroughs Wellcome Fund Investigators in the Pathogenesis of Infectious Diseases Award committee, and as chair of Conference on Retroviruses and Opportunistic Infections (CROI) as well as other major meetings. Overbaugh also had major leadership roles within her institutions. In 2017, Overbaugh was appointed the inaugural Hutch associate director for graduate education. In that capacity, she was subsequently named the inaugural senior vice president for education and in these leadership roles she established a new Office of Education and Training at the Fred Hutch. Overbaugh also established and led an NIH funded program to support and train graduate students pursuing research on viral evolution and pathogenesis across Seattle institutions and she served in a leadership role in the Medical Sciences Training program.

Her education and career development efforts along with her scientific excellence were widely recognized in the Seattle community. Despite never being given the tenure-track position afforded her male colleagues while at University of Washington, various university selection committees recognized her scientific excellence, both while there and when she moved to the Fred Hutch. In 1994, as a junior faculty member at UW, Overbaugh was selected to present the New Investigator lecture to the University of Medical School. In 2011, while at Fred Hutch, she was honored as the distinguished scientist of the year by the University of Washington School of Medicine. As part of this recognition, she presented her work to the School of Medicine in the Science in Medicine seminar series in a talk entitled “Deciphering the biology of HIV transmission: A basic scientist’s journey into interdisciplinary, international HIV research”. The University of Washington also recognized Overbaugh with an outstanding mentoring award in 2007. The Fred Hutch soon followed, bestowing their faculty mentoring award on Overbaugh in 2008.

Resignation from leadership: In early 2022, Overbaugh was placed on administrative leave from the Fred Hutchinson Cancer Research Center in order to conduct an independent external investigation. The investigation was prompted by an anonymous complaint regarding a Cancer Research Center Halloween Party in 2009 where she was asked to dress as Michael Jackson as part of a group "Thriller" costume and darkened her face for this role. This was determined to be an isolated incident, and an interview of her peers and coworkers failed to reveal any pattern of inappropriate behavior of any kind in the past or at any time while employed at Fred Hutch in her twenty-three year tenure. Overbaugh offered a public apology to the entire Fred Hutch community for any offense as described by the president of the Hutch in the town hall: "As part of [an] education healing process, Julie wanted to offer her direct apology to our community. I commend this." The external independent investigation report noted her decades-long leadership at Fred Hutch in support of equity and inclusion report and concluded that "Dr. Overbaugh’s individual contributions to DEI efforts at Fred Hutch have been significant, wide-reaching, and long-standing."

Having established the Office of Education and the position of senior vice president for education and serving in leadership roles in education for a decade at the Hutch, Overbaugh decided to step down from her administrative leadership roles to focus on her research on COVID, HIV and other emerging global pathogens. As the Hutch President reported: “Julie has offered to step down from her role as Senior Vice President of Education and Training and I have accepted her resignation”. “She will continue to be a prominent investigator at the Fred Hutch in the Human Biology Division working on viruses that affect so many people around the world”.

=== Research focus ===
Overbaugh's laboratory continues to study viral and immune factors that contribute to infection and disease in global populations at high risk of HIV infection. This includes continued studies of mother-infant HIV transmission and infant responses to infection. An aspect of the work of the lab includes defining how antibodies evolve to become more potent.

During the COVID pandemic, her laboratory started to apply their expertise in viral immunology to advance research on SARS-CoV-2 immunity. They developed tools that allows comprehensive profiling of antibody responses and pathways of escape. They are using these profiles to isolate and study antibodies to SARS-CoV-2, with a focus on identifying broad and potent antibodies that can recognize emerging variants of concern. She has also contributed to the discussions of re-infection.

The lab is studying other globally important pathogens such as Zika virus. They also study innate immune factors and their role in inhibiting virus replication.
