= Ruth W. Nduati =

Kenyan paediatrician and epidemiologist

Ruth Wanjirū Kareithi-Nduati
- Occupations: Pediatrician and Epidemiologist

Academic background
- Education: EDUCATION MPH (Epidemiology and International Health),University of Washington,Seattle, Washington, USA 1991-1994 Certificate of Tropical Medicine, University of Nairobi, Nairobi, Kenya 1986: M.Med (Paediatrics), University of Nairobi, Nairobi, Kenya. Dissertation: "The Bacteriology of Septic Arthritis in Children". 1984-1987: MB.Ch.B., University of Nairobi, Nairobi, Kenya 1976-1981: Kenya Advanced Certificate of Education-3 Principals (Biology-B, Chemistry-B, Physics-E) and asubsidiary in General paper, Kenya High School, Nairobi, Kenya. 1974-1975 Kenya Certificate of Education-Division 1 (11 points), Kenya High School, Nairobi, Kenya 1970-1973:

Academic work
- Discipline: Paediatrics and Epidemiology
- Institutions: University of Nairobi

Karithi Ruth Wanjirū Nduati is a Kenyan Pediatrician and Epidemiologist who also teaches at the University of Nairobi College of Health Sciences. She is also currently leading an interdisciplinary program through the University of Nairobi School of Medicine to educate physician-researchers to best implement HIV treatment and prevention methods backed by research. The program was funded by the Fogarty Training Grant which is a part of the PEPFAR funds the country of Kenya received.

== Early career and education ==
Originally from a rural part of Kenya, Nduati has stated that her interest in medicine began at an early age when a visiting Czech doctor helped cure her case of recurring eczema after many other doctors had given up. She later went on to complete secondary school and to become a part of the first group of women at the University of Nairobi School of Medicine, which she has stated was in part due to the newly independent Kenyan government's policy changes.

She holds a Bachelor of Medicine and Bachelor of Surgery along with a Masters in Public Health. Nduati is recognized for her work identifying and preventing mother-to-child-transmission (PMTCT) of HIV/AIDS through breastfeeding.

From September 1991 to October 1994, Nduati traveled to the University of Washington to complete her Masters in Public Health in the Department of Epidemiology. The master's degree program was funded by the Fogarty AIDS International Training Program.

== Work against HIV/AIDS ==
In 1994, Nduati published a case-study in collaboration with the University of Washington on one of the first identified instances of HIV transmission to an infant via ingestion of pooled breast milk or via wet-nurses, underscoring the need to screen breast milk to prevent HIV transmission. Dr. Nduati continued on this path of research to publish research on the prevalence of HIV-1 infected cells in breast milk in collaboration with the University of Washington and the University of Manitoba. This 1995 research provided insight into the high level of HIV-1 infected cells and HIV-1 DNA that infants may ingest through breast milk.

In 1997, she co-authored “Communicating with Adolescents about AIDS: Experience from Eastern and Southern Africa” with Wambui Kiai where she considers the impact of culture in developing and implementing effective prevention programs. Specifically, the book addresses Eastern and Southern Africa’s efforts to influence the sexual behaviors of the youth by diving into multiple factors and nuances of HIV transmission prevention programs, their successes and their shortcomings.

In 2000, Nduati conducted a randomized clinical trial, testing the mortality rate and transmission rate of HIV-1 from breastfeeding versus formula feeding. The results showed that there was a significant decrease in HIV-1 mother-to-child-transmission (MTCT) in the first few months. Nduati published a follow-up research article that showed that there was a significant increase in the mortality rate of both mother and infant of the breastfeeding arm as compared to the formula feeding arm. The results published in the study contradicted against the statements made by the WHO and UNICEF in 1992 and 1997 that encouraged breastfeeding over formulas and artificial feeding. The 2000 and 2001 article published by Nduati had numerous implications in public policy in Sub-Saharan Africa.

In 2004, Carey Farquhar and Nduati along with other researchers co-authored a research article that showed an increase in adherence to voluntary HIV-1 counseling, testing, and methods to prevent transmission of HIV-1 with partner participation in antenatal couples counseling. At the time, the presented research was in conflict with the decision to not disclose a patient's HIV status due to patient privacy issues.

In June 2006, Nduati attended a Conference on Childhood and AIDS hosted by UNICEF in Paris, France, where she stated that a larger, united program is needed to address educational, nutritional, and psychological problems affecting children orphaned by HIV/AIDS. Dr. Nduati states, “We’re still spending a lot of time describing their status, describing what’s happening to them, and very little efforts into programs that really work… on the grand public health scale”. Later that same year in August, Nduati spoke at the XVI International AIDS Conference in Toronto, Canada, discussing the lack of adequate access to HIV treatment and care targeted towards children in Sub-Saharan Africa.

Many of her research projects were utilized to supplement an internationally published report about the known information of HIV transmission through breastfeeding published in 2004 with the collaboration of UNICEF, UNAIDS, WHO, and UNFPA. Nduati has also contributed her knowledge in prevention of mother-to-child-transmission (PMTCT) of HIV by co-authoring multiple books and manuals to aid doctors in providing HIV treatment and care through organizations like UNICEF and ANECCA.

== Current work ==
Nduati teaches at the University of Nairobi as a senior lecturer while also serving as an External Advisory Board member for the University of Washington's Department of Global Health. She also currently works as the Secretary of the Network of AIDS Researchers in Eastern and Southern African (NARESA), which was funded by PEPFAR, in addition to being a member of the Scientific Secretariat of the Ghent International Working Group on Mother to Child Transmission of HIV-1.

Nduati is also working to address the low rate of condom usage and its impact on HIV transmissions in teenagers, citing younger individuals’ not fully formed decision-making portions of the brain to explain the low safe-sex behaviors in this population.

In the COVID-19 pandemic, Nduati is currently working as a volunteer physician at the Kenyatta National Hospital in Nairobi, Kenya, advocating for proper hand washing and for wearing masks to limit community spread of the COVID-19 virus.

== Awards ==
Nduati and Dalton Wamalwa were co-awarded the NIH Fogarty grant along with a PEPFAR grant to reduce the prevalence of MTCT of HIV in Kenya by improving current methods to better address HIV treatment and related issues. The five-year $3.2 million grant will primarily be used to train future physician-researchers to provide HIV related health care backed by original research and medical education training. The training program is part of the Health-Professional Education Partnership Initiative (HEPI), which serves as a continuation of the Medical Education Partnership Initiative (MEPI), to focus more on the research aspect of medicine along with physician training.

In 2007, Nduati was awarded the Dignity and Right to Health Award by the International Christian Medical and Dental Association.
