= Borabu Constituency =

Constituency of Kenya

Borabu
- constituency for the Parliament of Kenya
- Borabu Constituency within Nyamira County

- Nyamira County within Kenya
- County: Nyamira
- Population: 73,167
- Area: 247 km^{2} (95.4 sq mi)

Current constituency
- Created: 2013
- Number of members: 1
- Party: ODM
- Member of Parliament: Patrick Kibagendi Osero
- Created from: North Mugirango (Borabu)
- Wards: 4

Borabu is a constituency in Kenya. It is one of the four constituencies in Nyamira County. It was established prior to the 2013 general elections. It was initially part of North Mugirango (Borabu).

== Wards ==
Borabu Constituency has four electoral wards, namely: Esise, Mekenene, Kiabonyoru and Nyansiongo.

== Borabu Sub-county ==
Borabu Constituency shares common boundaries with Borabu Sub-county. The sub-county is headed by the Deputy County Commissioner under the Ministry of Interior and National Government.

== Members of Parliament ==
Election	Member of Parliament	Party	Notes
2013	Wilfred Ombui	KANU	
2013	Ben George Orori Momanyi	WDM-K	
2017	Ben George Orori Momanyi	WDM-K	
2022	Patrick Osero	ODM	
