= Borna Nyaoke-Anoke =

Kenyan physician and medical researcher

Borna Nyaoke
- Born: Kenya
- Education: University of Nairobi (Bachelor of Medicine and Bachelor of Surgery); Harvard School of Medicine (Global Clinical Scholars Research Training); University of Liverpool (Master of Public Health)
- Occupations: Physician and clinical researcher
- Title: Senior clinical project manager & medical manager at Drugs for Neglected Diseases Initiative/ Global Antibiotic Research and Development Partnership

Borna Nyaoke (born 1987) is a Kenyan physician and clinical researcher, who took over as head of mycetoma research in 2023 from her previous position as manager of clinical trials at Drugs for Neglected Diseases initiative/Global Antibiotic Research and Development Partnership (DNDi/GARDP). She previously worked as a clinical trial manager at the KAVI (Kenya AIDS Vaccine Initiative) Institute of Clinical Research, based in the University of Nairobi.

Nyaoke, a public health specialist; Dr. Roselyne Okello, a radiologist; Dr. Nida Okumu, an infectious diseases specialist; and Dr. Achieng Aling, an obstetrician and gynecologist, founded Hema Foundation, a Nairobi-based non-government organisation, in 2015. All four were classmates in medical school in Nairobi. Hema focuses on inner city girls aged 17 years and younger, screening for diseases, treating illnesses, encouraging schooling and STEM subject choices; as well as offering guidance, mentoring and counselling.

== Early life and career ==
Nyaoke attended Kenyan schools for her elementary and secondary education. She was admitted to the University of Nairobi, where she studied human medicine, graduating with a Bachelor of Medicine and Bachelor of Surgery (MBChB) degree. She graduated from the University of Liverpool with a Master of Public Health (MPH) degree, specializing in the management of health systems. She also attended the Global Clinical Scholars Research Training program at Harvard School of Medicine, specializing in the conduct of clinical trials.

Following the completion of her first degree, Nyaoke interned at Kenyatta National Hospital, then went on to work as a medical officer at The Nairobi Hospital. Since February 2018, she has worked at DNDi/GARDP as a manager of clinical trials. Effective January 2015, she serves as an executive director of Health and Wellness Solutions Limited, a private healthcare practice, providing both personal and corporate health solutions to its clients. As of June 2020, she had published the findings of her research in peer-reviewed publications.

Nyaoke argues that Kenyans used to live longer, before they started consuming highly processed foods and maintaining sedentary lifestyles. By extension, the increasing rates of non-communicable diseases in the community is related to the diet and physical activity and/or inactivity levels of that community.

== Awards ==
- 2017: Named "Top 40 Women Under 40 in Kenya" by the Nation Media Group
