= Nyambaria High School =

- Nyanza Province, Nyamira; Kenya

Information
- Type: Public
- Motto: Education for life
- Established: 1960
- School district: Nyamira
- President: Bivon Onyancha
- Dean: Jackson maranga
- Principal: Charles Onyari
- Staff: 180
- Enrollment: 4637
- Colors: Sky blue, black, navy blue, white.
- Affiliation: Seventh-day Adventist

Nyambaria High School is a secondary school located in Nyamira County, Kenya. It is a Seventh-day Adventist school that was established in 1966 as a small school, with few dormitories, but has grown considerably since then. Nyambaria School now has a student population of 4632. It is part of the Seventh-day Adventist Church's worldwide educational system.

Presently, the school has 65 classrooms 7 laboratories, 3 computer labs, a capacity library, a woodwork shop, 64 dormitories and much else besides. It is located in a hilly neighbourhood nicknamed "London" for its affluence.

Among the school's athletic facilities are: football, handball, rugby, and volleyball pitches, basketball and tennis courts. The school has an active record in co-curricular activities having reached the nationals levels in drama, rugby, music, science congress and indoor games. The students are also involved in contests, symposia, discussions and excursions.

Since the inception of the school, it has been served by the following principals:

1. Charles Mokaya (1966–1969)
2. Daniel Mosomi (1970–1973)
3. Musa Mokano (1974–1989)
4. Lazarus Mainye (1990–2003)
5. Robinson Otwori (2004–2016)
6. Gerald Orina (2016-2018)
7. Boaz Owino (2018–2022)
8. Mr. Onyari (2022 - To date)

== Spiritual aspects ==
All students take religion classes each year that they are enrolled. These classes cover topics in biblical history and Christian and denominational doctrines. Instructors in other disciplines also begin each class period with prayer or a short devotional thought, many which encourage student input. Weekly, the entire student body gathers together for an hour-long chapel service. Outside the classrooms there is year-round spiritually oriented programming that relies on student involvement.

== Athletics ==
The school offer the following sports:

- Soccer (boys )
- Tennis
- badminton
- basketball
- volleyball
- swimming
- rugby

== See also ==
- List of Seventh-day Adventist secondary and elementary schools
- Seventh-day Adventist education
- Seventh-day Adventist Church
- Seventh-day Adventist theology
- History of the Seventh-day Adventist Church
- List of Seventh-day Adventist secondary schools
