= International Christian Medical and Dental Association =

International association of Christian practicers of medicine and dentistry

ICMDA
- Formation: 1963
- Founded at: Amsterdam, Netherlands
- Type: Professional Association
- Headquarters: St Albans, UK
- Members: 60,000+ doctors & dentists
- CEO: Dr. Peter Saunders
- Chair: Dr Vijay Aruldas
- Staff: 7 (+ 68 paid fieldworkers)
- Website: https://icmda.net
- Formerly called: ICCP

ICMDA logo

The International Christian Medical and Dental Association (ICMDA (UK) ) is an international organisation of Christians in medicine and dentistry based in the UK. ICMDA is interdenominational and has member organisations in over 100 countries.

The ICMDA's International Office is in England. It was registered as a CIO charity in the UK in 2020.

== History ==
ICDMA traces its origin to the 1963 meeting in Amsterdam of International Congress of Christian Physicians (ICCP). This inaugural meeting had representatives from 15 countries. The organization has since held triennial conferences. The organization expanded its work, and at the 1986 conference, it changed its name to the International Christian Medical and Dental Association.

The next World Congress is due to be held in Jeju, South Korea in 2026.

== Member and partner organizations ==
- Christian Medical Fellowship (CMF), an interdenominational organization of Christian medical professionals based in the UK
- Christian Medical and Dental Associations (CMDA), a US-based group with 13,000 healthcare professionals members
- PRIME (Partnerships in International Medical Education), a UK charity "dedicated to improving standards of health care education worldwide"

== Current projects ==
=== Convoy of Hope ===
The Convoy of Hope project, in partnership with Christian Medical and Dental Association (ICMDA), Mighty Convoy (MC), and the Christian Medical Association of Ukraine (CMAU) is providing ambulances and medical supplies to Ukraine. Since February 2022 to March 2025, the project donated more than £10 million of aid.

== See also ==
- Christian Medical and Dental Society (Canada)
- Christian Medical Association of India
