= Nsunera =

Town in Kenya

Nsunera (Nyansiongo), is a town a few kilometres from the town of Kisii in Nyamira County, Kenya.

== Education ==
St. Andrew's Kaggwa Boys Boarding Primary School is a primary school. It is a Catholic school established in 1989. The institution is named after Andrew Kaggwa, one of the Uganda Martyrs, who were killed by Kabaka Mwanga II of the Buganda Kingdom.

It is in an academic location where it neighbours Nyansiongo High School, Nyansiongo D.O.K Primary School, and its sister school- St. Andrew's Kaggwa Girls Boarding Primary School.

It has a student population of about 1,000 students. It is composed of Grade Four (Standard Four) to Eight. Each grade has four streams, containing about fifty students.
