= Royal Commission on Canada's Economic Prospects =

- Also known as: The Gordon Commission
- Outcome: Final Report of the Royal Commission on Canada's Economic Prospects
- Commissioners: Walter L. Gordon (Chair); Omer Lussier; Albert Edward Grauer; Andrew Stewart; Raymond Gushue
- Inquiry period: 17 June 1955 – November 1957

The Royal Commission on Canada's Economic Prospects was initiated by the Louis St. Laurent government in order to develop recommendations regarding the Canadian economy. Chaired by Walter L. Gordon, its 1956 and 1957 reports were representative of a period of growing concern for Canadian nationalism and questioned the government's policy of allowing control of Canada's natural resources and other business enterprises to be sold to foreign interests.

When Gordon became Minister of Finance a decade later, he commissioned Mel Watkins to conduct a further investigation into foreign ownership of the Canadian economy, resulting in the "Watkins Report".

The Canada Development Corporation was created in 1971 as a result of both the Royal Commission's and the Watkins Report's recommendations.

== See also ==
- Economic nationalism
- List of Canadian royal commissions
- Royal commission
