= C. Gardner Mallonee =

American football and lacrosse player and coach (1903–1980)

Biographical details
- Born: October 8, 1903; Baltimore, Maryland, U.S.
- Died: November 14, 1980 (aged 77); Cockeysville, Maryland, U.S.

Playing career

Football
- 1924–1927: Johns Hopkins

Lacrosse
- 1925–1928: Johns Hopkins
- 1928: US Olympic team
- Position: End (football)

Coaching career (HC unless noted)

Football
- 1936–1945: Johns Hopkins

Basketball
- 1935–1936: Johns Hopkins
- 1937–1946: Johns Hopkins

Head coaching record
- Overall: 17–26–6 (football); 61–97 (basketball)

Accomplishments and honors

Awards
- All-Maryland football (1927)

Charles Gardner Mallonee (October 8, 1903 – November 14, 1980) was an American college football and lacrosse player and coach. He served as the head football coach at Johns Hopkins University from 1936 to 1945. As a college athlete, he competed in the 1928 Summer Olympics on United States lacrosse team.
