= Sherry Grauer =

Canadian mixed-media artist (born 1939)

Sherry (Sherrard) Grauer
- Born: February 20, 1939 (age 87); Toronto, Ontario
- Education: Wellesley College, École du Louvre, Atelier Ziegler, San Francisco Art Institute
- Known for: Sculptor, Painter
- Website: sherrardgrauer.com

Sherry (Sherrard) Grauer RCA (born February 20, 1939) is a mixed-media painter, sculptor, and relief artist. Her work "is noted for negotiating the boundary between painting and sculpture, in regards to her experiments with relief and surface volume."

== Early life ==
Sherry Grauer was born in Toronto, Ontario on February 20, 1939. Grauer's mother, Shirley Woodward Grauer, was an artist "until the demands of six children forced her to put her painting aside." Grauer's father, Dal Grauer, was the president of the B.C. Electric Company. Her grandmother was Zipporah Ritchie Woodward, a theatre director and supporter of Vancouver's arts community.

Grauer attended private school in Vancouver and then studied art history at the Wellesley College in Massachusetts. She has lived intermittently in Vancouver since 1946. During her junior year from 1958 to 1959, she went on an exchange to Paris, France and attended École du Louvre and Atelier Ziegler. It was here that she realized that she would rather make art herself than study it. From 1959 to 1961 and again from 1962 to 1964, she continued her studies in a new direction at the San Francisco Art Institute. Her early training consisted of formal training in anatomy and visual art techniques.

When she returned to Canada in 1964, her work became well known as she became featured in various exhibitions to shed light on the work of young artists.

== Exhibitions ==
Grauer has had solo and group exhibitions across Canada and internationally at galleries including the Bau-Xi Gallery (Vancouver), the University of British Columbia Fine Arts Gallery, the Vancouver Art Gallery, the Moore Gallery (Victoria), the Hamilton Art Gallery, the National Art Gallery of Canada (Ottawa), the Norman Mackenzie Art Gallery (Regina), and the Musée des beaux-arts de Montréal.

== Work ==
Grauer is a mixed-media artist who is known for her paintings, relief paintings, and sculptures and moves between the different mediums, "leaving a painting unfinished while she tackles sculpture." She has worked with materials such as wire mesh, wood, plaster, and canvas.

=== 2nd Post card from California ===
This work was first shown in the New Talents exhibition at the Vancouver Art Gallery in 1964. It was completed while Grauer was in art school. She deliberately chose to make it small in scale in order to contrast it with the large size works that were popular at the time.

The postcard shows two people, one riding a motorcycle under an overpass and the other leaning against the structure of the overpass and watching the other ride by. There seems to be no connection between the two figures, just a fleeting moment involving them both. It was an exercise in formal compositional arrangement. The contrast between the figures, the straight lines of the overpass and the rolling Californian hills in the background is striking.

=== Brave Birdmen ===
Created in 1980, this work shows a refinement of Grauer's technique with wire-mesh. It is her most "ambitious achievement to date." It was commissioned for the new Transport Canada Training Institute in Ontario. The work is a compilation of six unique large bird-people doing acrobatic acts on the trapeze. They are enchanting because the figures are fully engulfed by their actions. The way these figures are engrossed by what they are doing makes their actions believable, even though they strike the viewer as odd. Observing this piece urges the viewer to abandon expectations of how things should be and instead become absorbed by the situation presented by the figures.

While working with wire-mesh is difficult, Grauer was able to mould the medium into shapes that show even the smallest anatomical details with expert accuracy.

The piece took two years to finish. It was installed in March 1980.

=== The Stars are Coming Out ===
This work was shown as part of a solo exhibition of her work at the Bau-Xi Gallery in Vancouver, British Columbia in 1987. In The Stars are Coming Out, Grauer "evokes the tattered, straggling clouds in a twilight sky by looping and twisting strips of painted canvas and fastening them with metal studs." d

== Commissions ==
Grauer has made several private, public, and corporate commissions. Her commissions include Habitat Banners: Burrard Street Bridge (1976) for the City of Vancouver, Crows, Seagulls, Swallows (1978) for the Department of Public Works (Ottawa, Ontario), and Flirting Seals (2003) for North Growth Management.

=== Set design ===
In 1985, Grauer was commissioned to design a set for KniteQuest, a play by Peter Eliot Weiss and produced by Grauer's friend Pamela Hawthorn. In 1987, she worked on the set design for Song of This Place, a play about Emily Carr written by Joy Coghill.

== Positions ==
Grauer has held a number of positions including honorary secretary and member of the board of directors for the Vancouver Art Gallery (1975–76), member of the Acquisition Committee for the Vancouver Art Gallery (1993–94), jury for the Royal Canadian Academy of the Arts' Canada-wide exhibition, Arts 2000 (1999-2000), member of the Inaugural Jury of the Joseph Plaskett Foundation Award (2004), and Artist in Residence at The Artist Project, Island Mountain Arts (2006).
