= Catherine Nyongesa =

Kenyan physician and radiation oncologist

Doctor Catherine Nyongesa
- Born: 1970 (age 55–56); Kenya
- Citizenship: Kenya
- Education: University of Nairobi (MBChB); University of the Witwatersrand (MMed in Radiation Oncology); College of Radiation Oncologists of South Africa (Fellow of the College of Radiation Oncologists of South Africa)
- Occupations: Physician and oncologist
- Years active: 2000–present
- Title: Founder, owner & CEO of Texas Cancer Centre Nairobi
- Spouse: Samson W. Watta

Catherine Naliaka Nyongesa Watta (née Catherine Naliaka) (born 1970) is a Kenyan physician and radiation oncologist, who is the founder, owner and chief executive of Texas Cancer Centre, in Nairobi, the capital and largest city in the country.

== Background and education ==
Nyongesa was born in Kenya, c. 1970.

She attended Kenyan elementary and secondary schools. She studied at the University of Nairobi School of Medicine, graduating with a Bachelor of Medicine and Bachelor of Surgery (MBChB) degree. In 2002, she was admitted to the University of the Witwatersrand in Johannesburg, South Africa. There, she was enrolled into a three-year residency program to study to become a radiation oncologist, graduating in 2005 with a Master of Medicine (MMed) degree, in Radiation Oncology. Later she was elected as a Fellow of the College of Radiation Oncologists of South Africa (FCRO (SA)).

== Career ==
Following her specialized training in South Africa, Nyongesa returned to Kenya and was hired as a consultant radiation oncologist at Kenyatta National Hospital, the largest tertiary-care public referral hospital in the country. The case load was heavy, and all patients could not be helped, in the public setting.

In 2010, Nyongesa and her husband, a practicing pharmacist in the Houston-area, Texas, United States, started Texas Cancer Centre Nairobi. Initially the centre only offered chemotherapy treatment as an outpatient service. Later, the couple borrowed KSh100 million (approx. US$1 million), to build an inpatient facility at a second location in Nairobi. With assistance from the University of Texas MD Anderson Cancer Center, the Nairobi center acquired and installed a radiotherapy machine, set up a diagnostic laboratory and acquired x-ray machines and ultrasound equipment. As of March 2015, the centre had over 70 full-time staff, handling over 150 outpatients daily, and offered accommodation at a reasonable fee to out-of-town outpatients. As of July 2017, the Texas Cancer Centre has expanded to a total of four locations in Nairobi and Eldoret.

== Family ==
Nyongesa is a married mother of three children.

== Other considerations ==
Nyongesa is the first woman radiation oncologist in Kenya. She serves as chairwoman of the Kenya Society of Hematology and Oncology (KESHO). She is the clinical coordinator at the Cancer Treatment Centre of Kenyatta National Hospital. She is also an honorary lecturer at the University of Nairobi.
