= Koitalel Arap Samoei University =

University in Nandi County, Kenya

Koitaleel Samoei University College is a planned university in Nandi County, Kenya, due to open in 2015.

The County Government of Nandi agreed with the University of Nairobi to build a new university to be named after a legendary leader, Koitalel Samoei, killed in 1905 by the colonialists. As of 2014 the university was in the process of admitting students to Koitalel Arap Samoei University College for courses to begin in January 2015. The University of Nairobi has budgeted for Sh2 billion from the County Government for the construction according to the County Government of Nandi website. Academic programmes to be offered at the university are Law, Education and Business Management.

The university shall utilize the existing structures of the Samoei High School. The Commission for University Education in Kenya stated that it is satisfied that land available at the school is over 100 acres and therefore sufficient for expansion. As of 2018 construction started.
