= Margaret J. Hutchinson =

Kenyan academic administrator

- Born: Kenya
- Citizenship: Kenyan
- Occupations: Academic, university administrator
- Employer: University of Nairobi
- Known for: Acting Vice-Chancellor of the University of Nairobi
- Title: Acting Vice-Chancellor

Margaret J. Hutchinson is a Kenyan academic and university administrator who served as the Acting Vice-Chancellor of the University of Nairobi.

== Career ==
Hutchinson is a Horticulturalist and Senior Lecturer at the University of Nairob, she has held senior administrative roles at the University of Nairobi, where she served as Acting Vice-Chancellor of the university prior to the appointment of Ayub Gitau as substantive Vice-Chancellor in May, 2026.

== See also ==
- University of Nairobi
