= Lacrosse at the 1928 Summer Olympics =

Men's lacrosse at the Games of the IX Olympiad
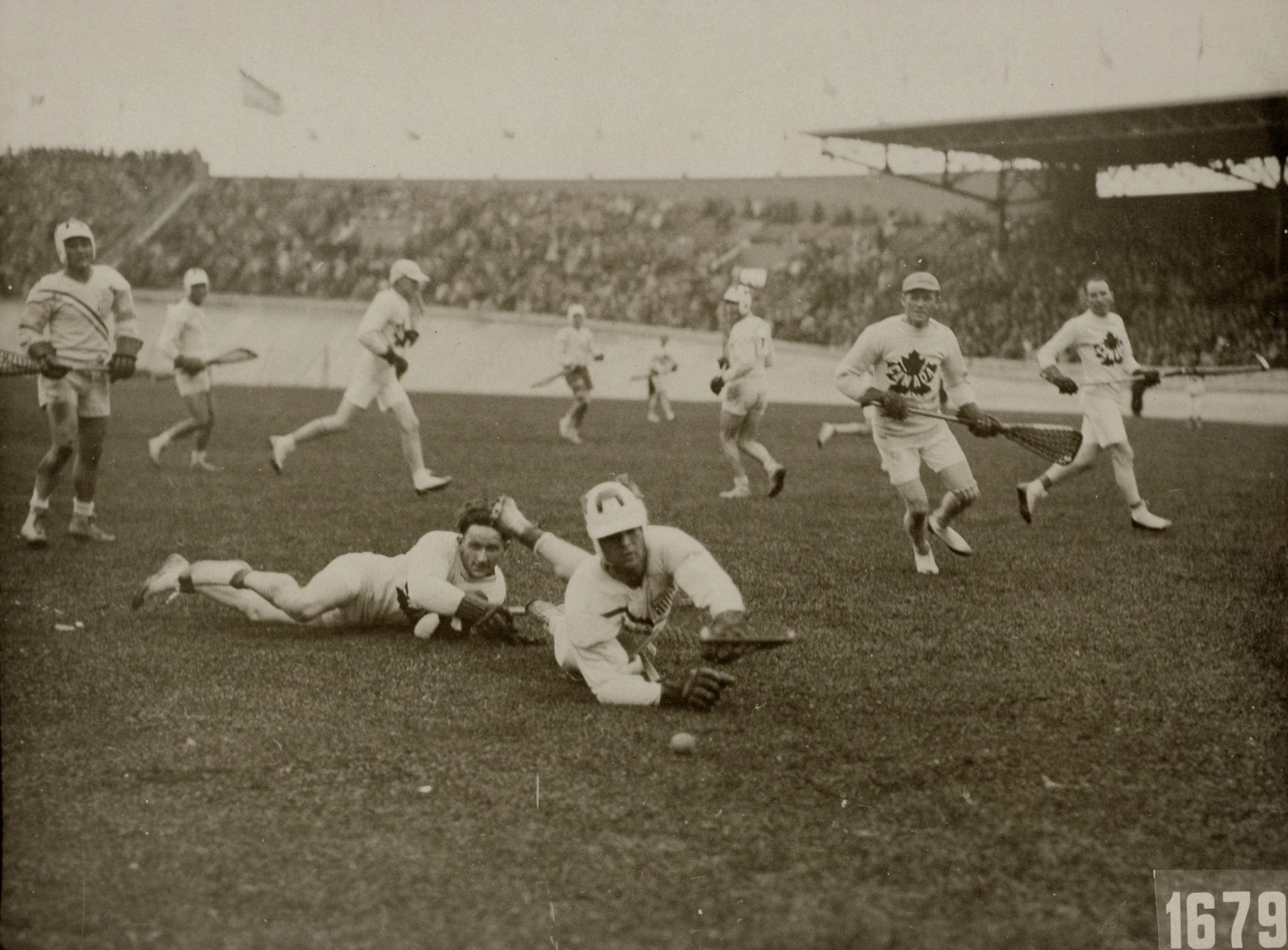
- Date: August 5–7
- Competitors: 52 from 3 nations

Lacrosse was a demonstration sport at the 1928 Summer Olympics in Amsterdam. Teams from Canada, Great Britain, and the United States played round-robin matches on August 5, 6 and 7. Each team ended the tournament with a record of 1 win and 1 loss.

The Johns Hopkins Blue Jays represented the United States and the New Westminster Salmonbellies represented Canada. Great Britain sent their all-star team.

== Results ==
Standings
Pos	Team	Pld	W	L	GF	GA	GD	Pts
1	Canada	2	1	1	12	11	+1	3
1	Great Britain	2	1	1	12	15	−3	3
1	United States	2	1	1	12	10	+2	3

- August 5, 1928 - United States 6 - Canada 3
- August 6, 1928 - Great Britain 7 - United States 6
- August 7, 1928 - Canada 9 - Great Britain 5

== Teams ==
=== Canada ===
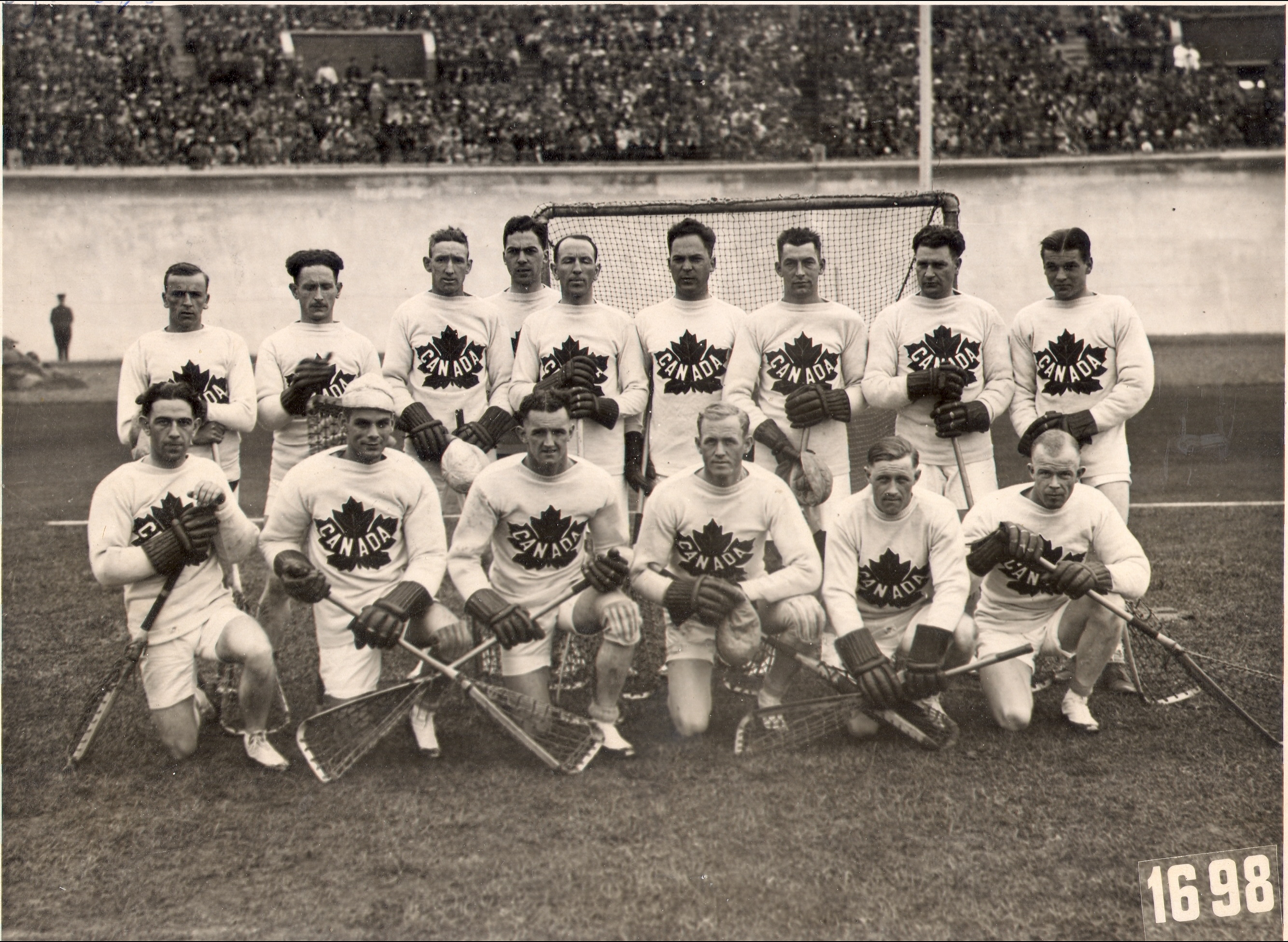
Team Canada

Starters

- J. Stoddart
- L. Gregory
- C. Grauer
- R. A. Mackie
- A. Farrow
- W. Fraser
- A. Brown
- J. Vernon
- N. Atkinson
- J. Wood
- C. Doyle
- A. W. Wilkie

Reserves:

- F. D. Bourne
- D. Grauer
- L. P. Gregory
- E. G. Burnett
- W. G. Hersperger

=== United States ===
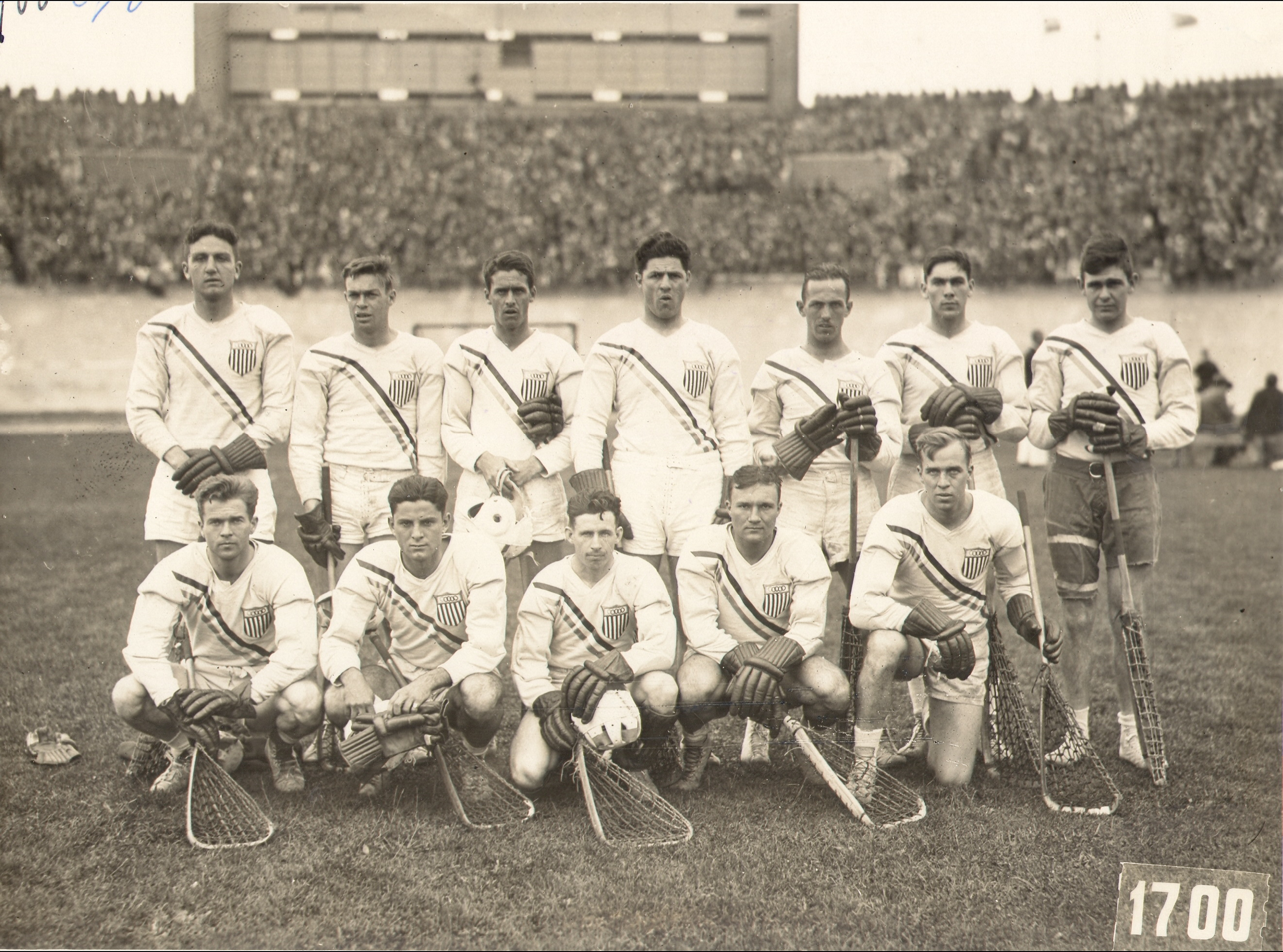
Team United States

Starters:

- W. F. Logan
- Th. N. Biddison
- G. Helfrich
- J. K. Eagan
- L. S. Nixdorff
- J. D. Lang
- J. W. Boynton
- Robert H. Roy
- W. A. Kegan
- R. M. Finn
- C. Gardner Mallonee
- C. Leibensperger

Reserves:

- F. H. Dotterweich
- L. H. Farinholt
- W. P. Hall, Jr.
- H. M. Caplan
- C. C. Brownley

=== Great Britain ===
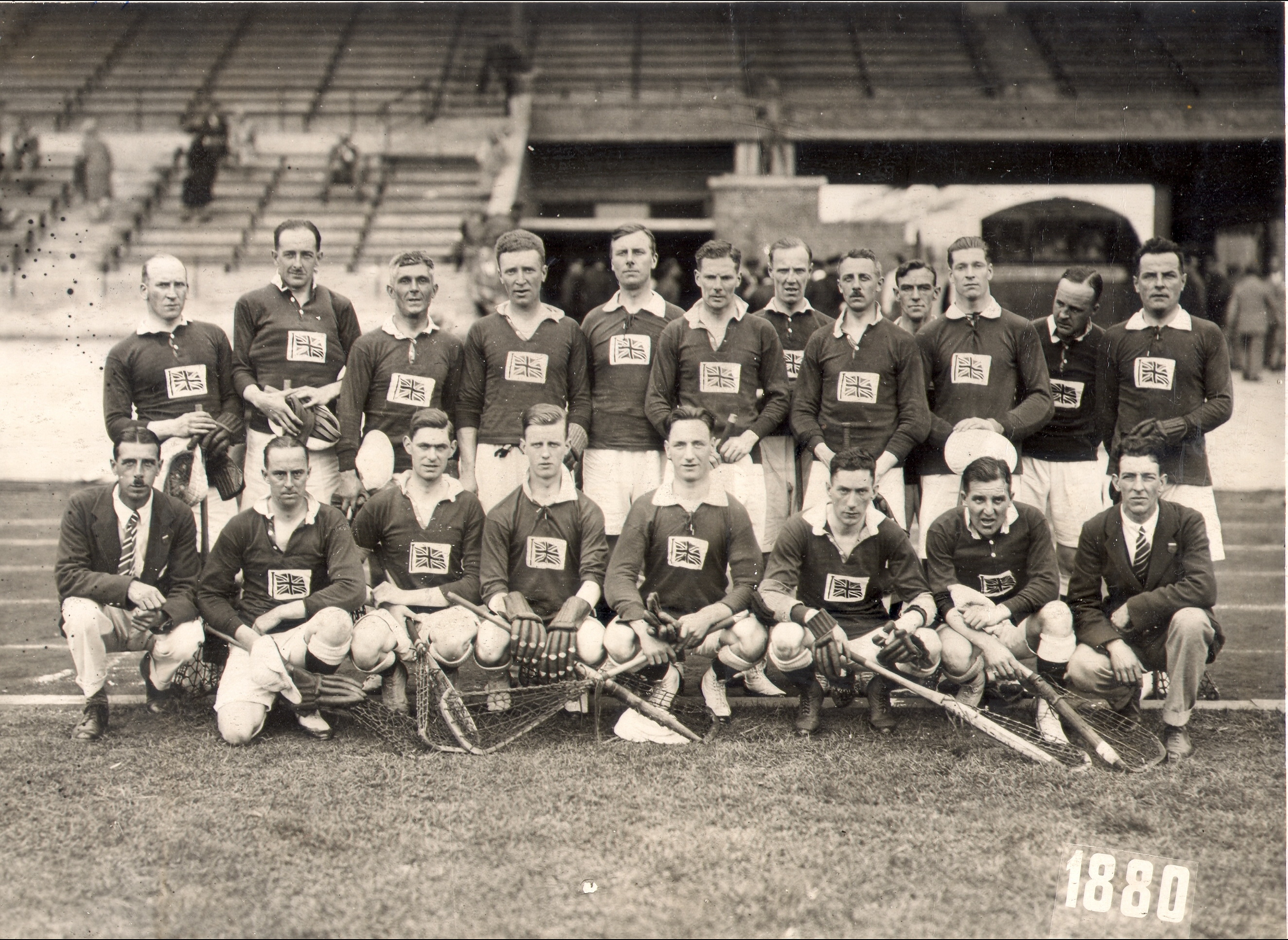
Team Great Britain

Starters:

- P. L. V. Astle
- L. Clayton
- A. B. Craig
- H. H. Crofts
- S. M. Fleeson
- G. F. Higson
- F. E. Johnson
- H. C. Johnson
- O. J. Knudsen
- E. Parsons
- F. C. G. Perceval
- A. J. Phillips

Reserves:

- E. R. Richards
- G. P. Seed
- W. D. Stott
- E. E. Tweedale
- S. Wood
- J. P. V. Woollam

== See also ==
- Federation of International Lacrosse
- World Lacrosse Championship
