= Zipporah Gathuya =

Kenyan anesthesiologist

- Born: Kenya
- Citizenship: Kenya
- Education: University of Nairobi (Bachelor of Medicine and Bachelor of Surgery); Children's Hospitals and Clinics of Minnesota (short interactive clinical course in Pediatric Anesthesia); Undisclosed institution in South Africa (Master of Medicine in Anesthesiology)
- Title: Consultant pediatric anesthesiologist

Zipporah Gathuya is a Kenyan consultant anesthesiologist, whose sub-specialty is pediatric anesthesia. She served as the principal surgeon at St. John Ambulance Kenya, for the 21 years between 1996 and 2017.

== Background and education ==
Gathuya was born in Kenya c. 1970s, and attended Kenyan schools for her elementary and secondary education. She was admitted to the University of Nairobi, where she studied human medicine, graduating with a Bachelor of Medicine and Bachelor of Surgery (MBChB) degree.

In 2004, while working in the intensive care unit at Kenyatta National Hospital, in Nairobi, she met two pediatric anesthesiologists from the United States. They invited her to accompany them to Minneapolis/St. Paul, Minnesota, where Gathuya attended a short, interactive course in pediatric anesthesia at the Children's Hospitals and Clinics of Minnesota. Upon her return to Kenya, she found a sponsor who funded her studies in South Africa, where she graduated with a Master of Medicine (MMed) degree in Anesthesiology.

== Work experience ==
Gathuya interned at Chogoria Mission Hospital in Tharaka-Nithi County, approximately 187 kilometres (116 mi), by road, north-east of Nairobi, where she earned KSh11,430 (US$114.30) per month. In contrast, in July 2017, a medical officer who has just completed internship earned KSh206,989 (US$2,069.89) per month. After her internship, she was hired by Kenyatta National Hospital as a medical officer. While working there, in the intensive care unit, she decided to specialize as a pediatric anesthesiologist.

== Personal life ==
Gathuya is a married mother of four children, although she cares for a larger number, including bereaved nieces and nephews who lost both parents.

== Other considerations ==
Gathuya is a volunteer with St. John Ambulance Kenya, where she served as the principal surgeon for 21 consecutive years, ending in 2017. She is a member of the board at Suntra Investment Bank, a brokerage company, based in Nairobi.

Se is an active member of Children's Surgery International, a Minneapolis-based non-profit that carries out surgical missions to needy communities. She has participated in surgical camps to Bangladesh, Ethiopia, Peru, South Africa, United States and other countries.

Gathuya is a director at the Global Initiative for Children's Surgery, a non-profit organization with 501(c)(3) status in the United States.

She is a member of the Society for Pediatric Pain Medicine, based in Richmond, Virginia, United States.

She serves on the Global Medical Advisory Board of Smile Train, the world's largest cleft lip and palate organization.
