= James Ondicho Gesami =

Kenyan politician

James Ondicho Gesami is a Kenyan politician. He belongs to the Orange Democratic Movement and was elected to represent the West Mugirango Constituency in the National Assembly of Kenya since the 2007 Kenyan parliamentary election. a physician that graduated from at the University of Nairobi. He is also husband to Rachel Mokaya Gesami, who is a well known professor.
