= Sylvia Shitsama Nyamweya =

Kenyan neurosurgeon

Shitsama Nyamweya
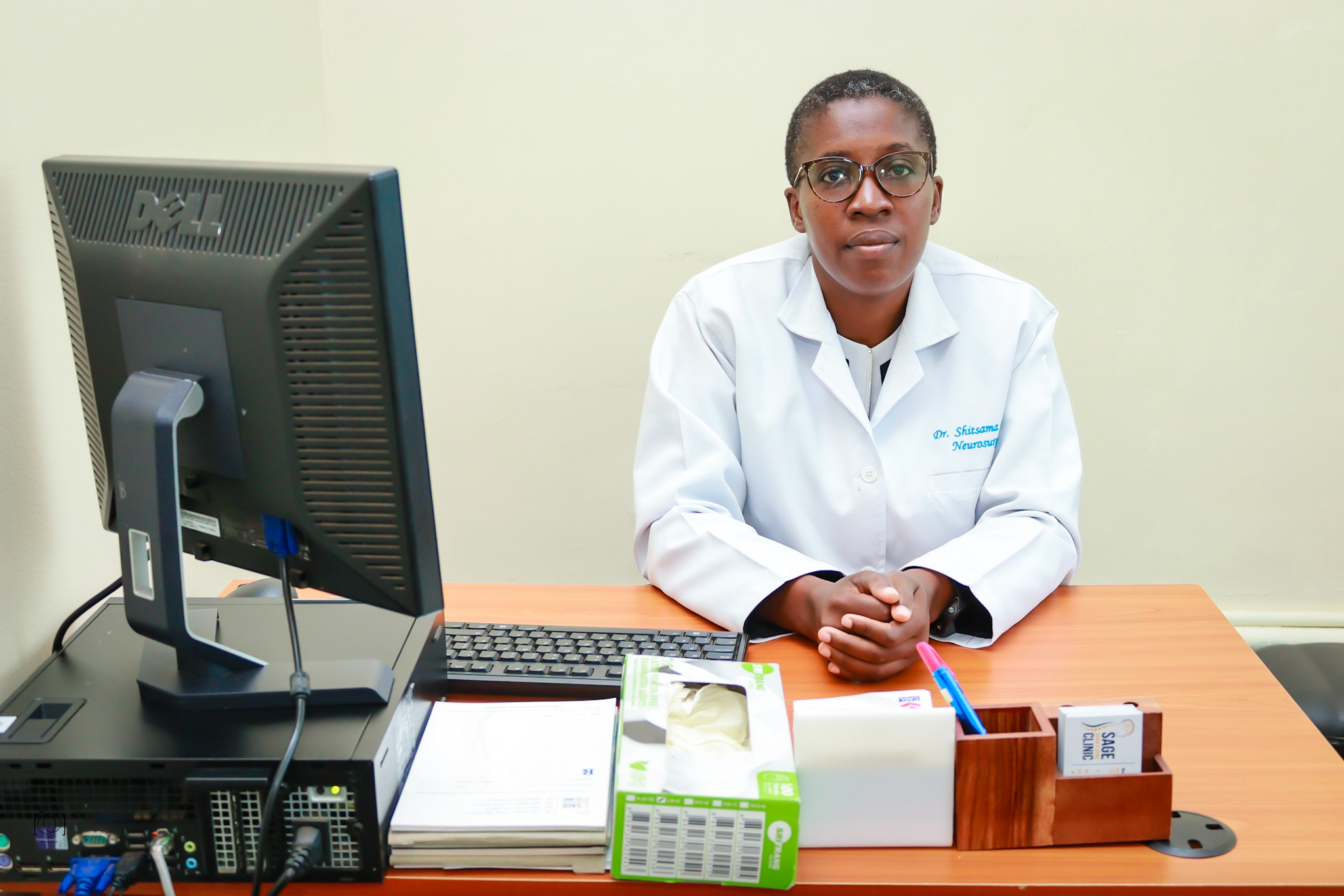
- Born: 1983 (age 42–43); Kenya
- Citizenship: Kenya
- Education: University of Nairobi (Bachelor of Medicine and Bachelor of Surgery) (Master of Medicine in Neurosurgery)
- Occupation: Consultant neurosurgeon
- Website: https://drsylviashitsama.com

Sylvia Shitsama Nyamweya (née Sylvia Shitsama) is a Kenyan consultant neurosurgeon at the Kenyatta National Referral Hospital. She is the first female neurosurgeon in Kenya and one of a handful of female neurosurgeons in the country.

== Background and education ==
Nyamweya was born in the Kakamega District in Kenya in 1983, and attended Kenyan schools for her elementary and secondary education. She was admitted to the University of Nairobi, where she studied human medicine, graduating with a Bachelor of Medicine and Bachelor of Surgery (MBChB) degree. In 2008, she was admitted into the neurosurgery residency program at Kenyatta National Hospital, operated by the University of Nairobi. The program, lasting at least six years, leads to the award of a Master of Medicine (MMed) degree in Neurosurgery. She graduated with her MMed degree in 2015, and became the first female neurosurgeon in Kenya.

== Career ==
Nyamweya was appointed as a consultant neurosurgeon at Kenyatta National Hospital, the largest referral hospital in the country, which also serves as the teaching hospital of the Nairobi Medical School. Effective January 2016, she concurrently serves as a lecturer at the College of Health Sciences at the Jomo Kenyatta University of Agriculture and Technology (JKUAT). In June 2017, she began working at Sage Brain and Spine Clinic, located at the Kenya Medical Association Centre in Nairobi. She is reported to be seeking funding to sponsor residents enrolled in the neurosurgery Master of Medicine programme to increase enrollment and output of specialist neurosurgeons.

Nyamweya has served as a board member of the Kenya Medical Association Sacco (KMA), responsible for member credit issues.

== Honors and awards ==
In 2017, she was named among the "Top 40 Women Under 40 in Kenya" by the Nation Media Group. In 2022, she was one of 14 people honored at the Grow, Unite, Build, Africa (GUBA) Awards, and received the Pioneer Award for Health Excellence.
