= Zipporah Ritchie Woodward =

Vancouver arts supporter (1885–1976)

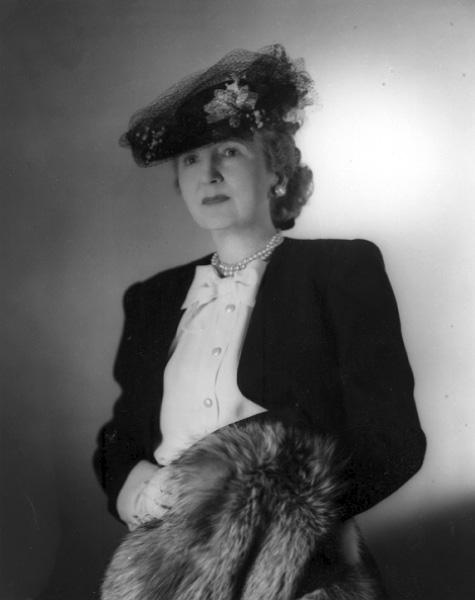
Zipporah Ritchie Woodward (Mrs. Ernest Woodward) 1945. University of British Columbia Archives

Zipporah Ritchie Woodward (July 23, 1885 – July 26, 1976) was a theatre director, writer, and supporter of the arts community in Vancouver, British Columbia from the 1920s to the 1970s. She was described as the "Grand Dame" of Vancouver's establishment by Vancouver Life Magazine.

== Early history ==
Woodward, whose maiden name was Ritchie, was born in Minneapolis, Minnesota. She attended Wells College in Aurora, New York, USA, in the early 1900s. After marriage, she became known as "Mrs. E.A. Woodward" or "Mrs. Ernest Woodward".

While at Wells College, she was a story contributor and associate editor at the college's student journal, the Wells College Chronicle.

== Arts career ==
Woodward directed several plays for the Vancouver Little Theatre on Vancouver's Commercial Drive in the 1920s and 1930s. These included George Bernard Shaw's Arms and the Man in the 1926–27 season, John H. Turner's The Lilies of the Field in the 1928–29 season and Androcles and The Lion in 1930. Her direction of "The Second Man" at the Vancouver Little Theatre in 1931 was described in the Vancouver Sun as "sure and deft". She also served on the Little Theatre's Board of Directors from 1931 to 1932. In the 1930s she was on the Advisory Council to the National Film Society.

In 1941 she directed "Candida" by George Bernard Shaw, produced by the University of British Columbia Players Club. Included in the cast was Arthur Hill, who became a famous Canadian actor, and Lister Sinclair, who went on to acclaim as a Canadian broadcaster and playwright. Just ahead of the opening night performance, she and other production members were interviewed on a live broadcast on Vancouver's (now former) CJOR Radio Station by Dorwin Baird of CJOR and Pierre Berton of the university's Radio Society. Her cast also travelled to Vernon, BC. to perform "Candida" in May that year. In 1945 she directed "Claudia", a production of the UBC Players Club Alumni at the UBC Auditorium.

In 1945 she published a series in The Vancouver Daily Province newspaper "Letters from a Mother to Her Son".

She was president of the BC Drama Association (now known as Theatre BC) from 1948 to 1951. As of 1951 she was the chair of the Vancouver Symphony Society. In 1956 she appeared as a Panelist on Canadian Playwriting at the Frederic Wood Theatre at UBC; in the mid-1960s she sat on the Governing Committee of the Canadian Drama Awards.

She was an active member of the Board of Directors of the Community Arts Council of Vancouver starting from the late 1950s and early 1960's on into the 1970s.

Woodward was known as a prolific letter writer, who would often share special quotations.

== Personal ==
In the early 1920s, Woodward moved with her family from Winnipeg to Vancouver, where her husband Ernest Austin Woodward built a successful business with an innovative grain elevator. His company was known as Columbia Grain Elevator Company. The family resided on Vancouver's affluent Point Grey Road, in a home called "Seagate Manor".

Aside from her active involvement in the arts community, Woodward also was active in the Women's Auxiliary to Vancouver General Hospital. As of 1954 she was chair and second vice-president; by 1963 she had been made Honorary President.

Woodward was survived by her three children: Geoffrey Woodward, Shirley Woodward Grauer Owen, and Peter Woodward. Upon her death, Vancouver columnist Mamie Maloney mourned her friend's loss to the city, describing her as "one of the last great ladies".

== Prominent family ==
Woodward's artist daughter Shirley Woodward married Vancouver intellectual and businessman Dal Grauer, who became president of the BC Electric Company. Dal Grauer died in 1961. Shirley Woodward Grauer subsequently married Walter S. Owen, a lawyer who was appointed BC's Lieutenant Governor in 1973.

Her granddaughter is artist Sherry Grauer.
