= Jemimah Kariuki =

Kenyan founder of free ambulance service

- Citizenship: Kenya
- Occupations: Doctor, preventive medicine, physician

Jemimah Kariuki is a Kenyan doctor specializing in preventive medicine, maternal and child health. During the COVID-19 pandemic she organised an ambulance service which enabled pregnant women to access maternity care. She was listed as one of the BBC's 100 Women in 2020.

== Career ==
Kariuki is a resident doctor of obstetrics and gynaecology at Kenyatta National Hospital at the University of Nairobi. She is the founder of the Peace Club, started in response to post-election violence in 2007, and the Public Health Club, which is dedicated to the prevention and awareness of cervical cancer.

During the COVID19 pandemic in Kenya, as a maternity doctor, she noticed a sharp decline in maternal patients, but an increase in complications, especially during the hours of curfew. Kenya is one of the countries with the highest rates of mortality for both mothers and children, which the curfew caused to increase, according to experts. Kariuki realized that access to health care was delayed due to limited transportation options. Initially she used the social media platform Twitter to ask for support from government organisations and private companies to transport expectant parents to the hospital. This idea led to Wheels for Life, a free ambulance service.

== Awards ==
On 23 November 2020, Kariuki was on the BBC's list of the 100 most influential women of the year.

25 May 2021 - WHO Director-General's Award for Global Health 2021 in recognition of her contribution to advancing global health.
