= Kawango Agot =

Kenyan professor

- Medical career
- Profession: Professor
- Sub-specialties: HIV transmission
- Research: HIV specialist

Kawango Agot
- Born: Kenya
- Died: 17 August 2024; Zambia
- Citizenship: Kenyan
- Education: University of Nairobi (B.Sc.); Moi University (M.Ph.); University of Washington (Ph.D., M.P.H.)
- Occupations: Public health, researcher
- Title: Dr

Kawango Agot (died August 17, 2024) was a Kenyan public health researcher and epidemiologist. Her research focused on HIV, HIV transmission, and male circumcision. She was the project coordinator of a joint research project between her university and the universities of Illinois and Manitoba, evaluating the effect of male circumcision among HIV in young men.

She was an HIV specialist.

A Fulbright scholar, she earned her bachelor's degree from the University of Nairobi, a Master of Philosophy from Moi University, and a PhD and MPH at the University of Washington.

== Early life and education ==
She received her early education in Kenya. She earned a Bachelor of Education degree from the University of Nairobi and went on to obtain a Master of Philosophy in Applied Human Nutrition from Moi University. Her work at Moi University included research on nutritional issues and HIV epidemiology.

Kawongo Agot advanced her training internationally by enrolling at the University of Washington, Seattle where she earned both a Master of Public Health and a Doctor of Philosophy in Epidemiology concurrently. Her graduate work provided the basis for her later leadership in HIV prevention research and programs across Kenya.

== Career ==
Her career in HIV prevention research began in the early 2000s with the randomised controlled trial of male circumcision for HIV prevention. This trial demonstrated a reduction in HIV acquisition amongst circumcised men and influenced global public health policy at the time.

== Achievements ==
She was a member of the International AIDS Society and was recognized for her role in bridging research and policy implementation in HIV programs. Her work contributed to the global understanding of HIV prevention in low resource environments and aided Kenya's national HIV strategy.

== Death ==
Kawango Agot died on 17 August, 2024 after attending a two day conference in Zambia.
