= University of Nairobi =

Public university in Nairobi, Kenya

- Chuo Kikuu cha Nairobi (Swahili)
- Coat of Arms of the University
- Former names: Royal Technical College of East Africa (1956–1961); Royal College of Nairobi (1961–1964); University College, Nairobi (1964–1970)
- Motto: Latin: Unitate et labore
- Motto in English: "In unity and work"
- Type: Public
- Established: 1 July 1970; 56 years ago, as University of Nairobi
- Parent institution: Formerly the University of London and the University of East Africa
- Affiliations: ACU
- Chancellor: Prof. Patrick Verkooijen
- Vice-Chancellor: Professor Margaret J. Hutchinson(Ag)
- Undergraduates: 35,897
- Postgraduates: 11,003
- Location: University Wy, Nairobi, Kenya, Nairobi, Kenya; 1°16′47″S 36°49′00″E
- Campus: Urban
- Colors: Sky blue
- Website: www.uonbi.ac.ke

The University of Nairobi (UoN; Swahili: Chuo Kikuu cha Nairobi) is a collegiate research university based in Nairobi and is the largest university in Kenya. Although its history as an educational institution dates back to 1956, it did not become an independent university until 1970. During that year, the University of East Africa was split into three independent universities: the Makerere University in Uganda, the University of Dar es Salaam in Tanzania, and the University of Nairobi in Kenya.

During the 2023 academic year, the university had 49,047 students, of whom 35,897 were undergraduates and 11,003 were postgraduates. The university launched several policy frameworks and introduced self-funded enrollment (also called 'module 2') to cope with the rising demand for higher education in Kenya.

== Establishment ==
The inception of the University of Nairobi dates back to 1956, with the establishment of the Royal Technical College, which admitted its first group of A-level graduates for technical courses in April of the same year. The Royal Technical College was transformed into the second university college in East Africa on 25 June 1961 by the Scottish mathematician Professor James Morton Hyslop, formerly of the University of Witwatersrand under the name Royal College of Nairobi. It joined the University of London's 'schemes of special relations' and began preparing students in the faculties of Arts, Science and Engineering for University of London award degrees. Meanwhile, students in other faculties such as the Faculty of Special Professional Studies (later renamed Faculty of Commerce) and Faculty of Architecture continued to offer diplomas for qualifications of professional bodies/institutions.

On 20 May 1964, the Royal College of Nairobi was renamed University College Nairobi as a constituent college of the Federal University of East Africa. During this time, enrolled students studied for college degrees awarded by the University of East Africa instead of the University of London. In 1970, it transformed into the first national university in Kenya and was renamed the University of Nairobi. The university tops in Kenya's university ranking. It is ranked 7th in Africa and 1698 in the world according to Webometrics Ranking of World Universities.

== History ==
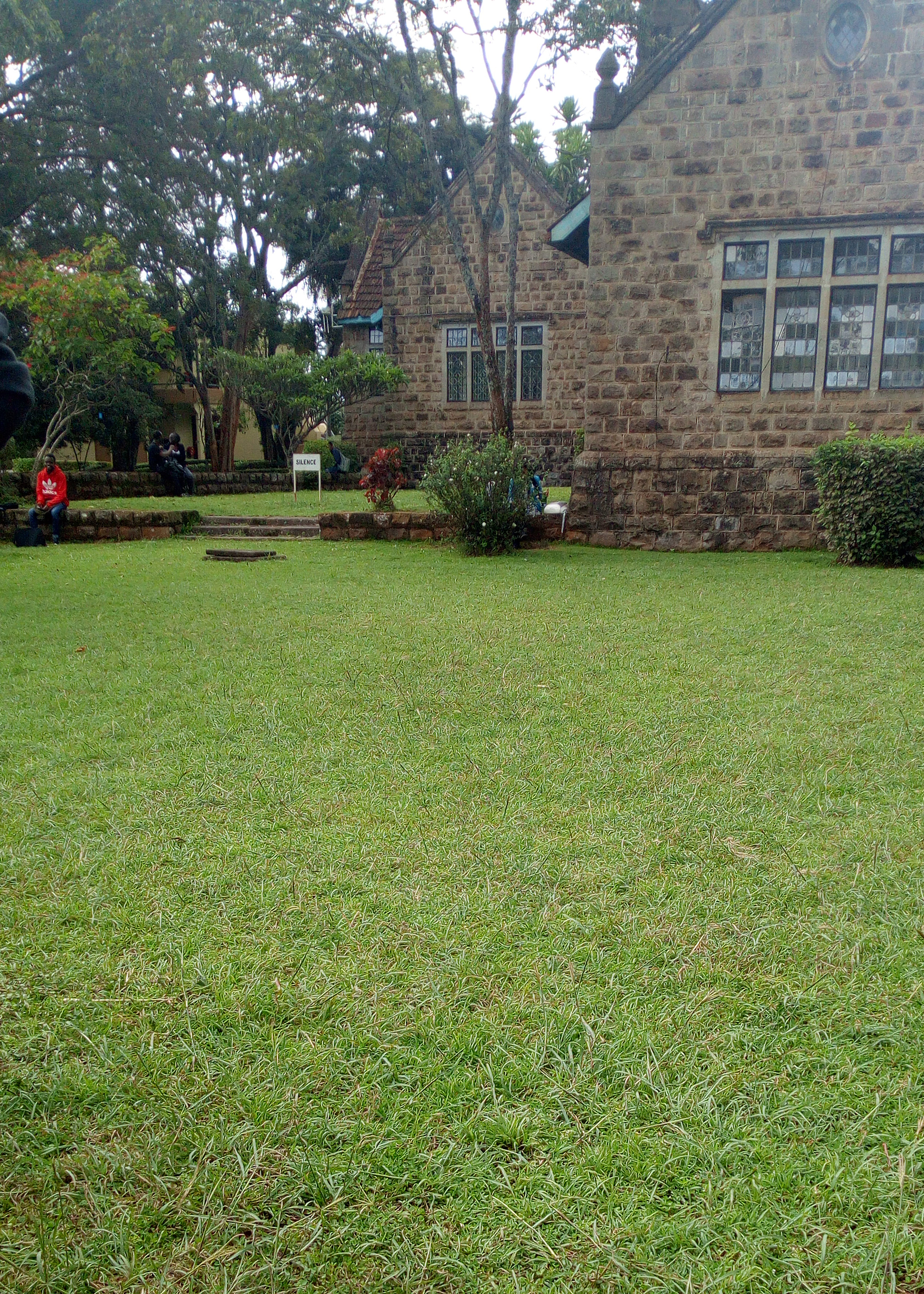
Former offices

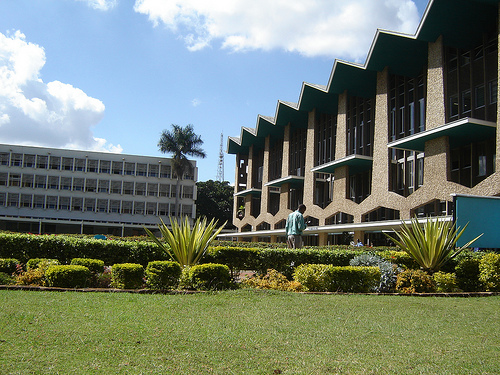
View from main entrance

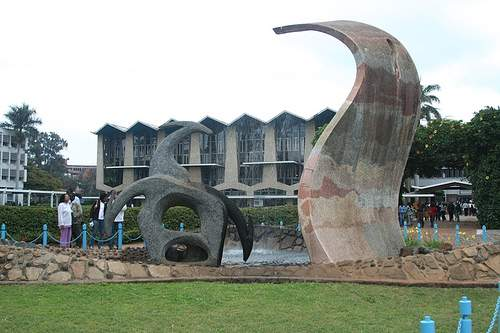
View from main quadrangle

The idea of an institution for higher learning in Kenya goes back to 1947 when the Kenyan colonial government drew up a plan for the establishment of a technical and commercial institute in Nairobi. By 1949, this plan had grown into a concept aimed at providing higher technical education for Kenya. In September 1951, a Royal Charter was issued to the Royal Technical College, Nairobi and the foundation stone of the college was laid in April 1952.

During the same period, the Asian community was also planning to build a college for Arts, Science and Commerce as a memorial to Mahatma Gandhi. To avoid duplication of efforts, Gandhi Memorial Academy Society partnered with the colonial government. Thus, the Gandhi Memorial Academy was incorporated into the Royal Technical College, Nairobi in April 1954, and the college proceeded to open its doors to the first intake of students in April 1956.

Soon after the arrival of students at the college, the pattern of higher education in Kenya came under scrutiny. Through the recommendation of a working party formed in 1958, chaired by the Vice-Chancellor of the University of London, Sir John Lockwood, the Royal Technical College, Nairobi was transformed. On 25 June 1961, the college became the second university college in East Africa, under the name "Royal College Nairobi."

The Royal College Nairobi was renamed "University College, Nairobi" on 20 May 1964. On the attainment of "University College" status, the institution prepared students for bachelor's degrees awarded by the University of London, while also continuing to offer college diploma programmes. The University College Nairobi provided educational opportunities in this capacity until 1966 when it began preparing students exclusively for degrees of the University of East Africa, with the exception of the Department of Domestic Science. With effect from 1 July 1970, the University of East Africa was dissolved and the three African countries of Kenya, Uganda and Tanzania each had its own national universities. This development saw the birth of the University of Nairobi set up by an Act of Parliament. Since 1970, the university had grown from a faculty based university serving a student population of 2,768 to a college focused university serving over 68,000 students.

In 2001, the first Confucius Institute in Africa opened as a collaboration between University of Nairobi and Tianjin Normal University in China.

== Profile ==
It is a body corporate established under the Universities Act 2012 of the Laws of Kenya and the Charter.

Through module II and III programmes, opportunity has been opened to thousands of Kenyans and foreigners especially from Sudan, on a paying basis, who meet university admission requirements, but who have not been able to access university education due to restricted intake into the regular programmes that is determined by limited resource allocation by Government. In addition to the regular, evening and, weekend programmes, classes are conducted at the University's Extra-Mural Centres located at the country's county headquarters.

The university is admitting students to undertake courses in the proposed Koitalel Arap Samoei University College for law, business management and education courses that began in January 2015. This is a joint project of the County Government of Nandi and the University of Nairobi.

== Restructuring ==
The university underwent a major restructuring in 1983, resulting in decentralization of the administration, by the creation of six colleges headed by principals. Further, in 2021, the university was further restructured to faculties headed by Deans, phasing out the colleges.

== Faculties ==
- Veterinary Medicine
- Arts & Social Sciences
- Science and Technology
- Law
- Agriculture
- Business and Management Science
- Education
- Engineering
- Built Environment and Design
- Health Sciences

== Departments ==
- Agricultural Economics
- Food Science, Nutrition And Technology
- Land Resource Management And Agricultural Technology
- Plant Science & Crop Protection
- Linguistics, Languages and Literature
- History and Archeology
- Philosophy and Religious Studies
- Library and Information
- Art and Design
- Architecture
- Real Estate, Construction Management and Quantity Surveying
- Urban and Regional Planning
- Business Administration
- Finance & Accounting
- Management Science and Project Planning
- Educational Management, Policy and Curriculum Studies
- Educational Foundations
- Educational Communication And Pedagogical Studies
- Educational and Distance Studies
- Physical Education And Sport
- Mechanical and Manufacturing Engineering
- Civil and Construction Engineering
- Electrical and Information Engineering
- Environmental and Biosystems Engineering
- Geospatial and Space Technology
- Dental Sciences
- Nursing Sciences
- Public and Global Health
- Surgery
- Human Anatomy and Physiology
- Clinical Medicine and Therapeutics
- Paediatrics and Child Health
- Obstetrics and Gynaecology
- Human Pathology
- Psychiatry
- Diagnostic Imaging and Radiation Medicine
- Medical Microbiology and Immunology
- Pharmacy
- Chemistry
- Computing and Informatics
- Mathematics
- Physics
- Biology
- Earth and Climate Sciences
- Biochemistry
- Anthropology, Gender and African Studies
- Economics, Population and Development Studies
- Sociology, Social Work and African Women Studies
- Political Science, Diplomacy and Public Administration
- Journalism and Mass Communication
- Public Health, Pharmacology and Toxicology
- Veterinary Anatomy and Physiology
- Animal Production
- Clinical Studies
- Veterinary Pathology, Microbiology and Parasitology

== Rankings ==
University rankings

Global – Overall
- QS World: 1001–1200 (2024)
- THE World: 1201–1500 (2024)

In 2023, Times Higher Education ranked the university within the 1201–1500 band globally.

== Notable alumni ==
- Kawango Agot, researcher and HIV specialist
- Elijah Ateka, Professor of Plant Virology
- Avril, singer and actress
- Stellah Wairimu Bosire-Otieno, physician and corporate executive
- Ali Rasso Dido, National Assembly member
- Rigathi Gachagua, Deputy president of Kenya
- Mumina Gollo Bonaya, National Assembly member
- Zipporah Gathuya, pediatric anesthesiologist
- Robert Gichimu Githinji, Member of Parliament
- Githinji Gitahi, physician and Global Chief Executive Officer, Amref Health Africa
- Josephine Gitome, academic and religious studies scholar
- James Gita Hakim, professor of medicine, cardiologist and HIV clinical trialist
- Patrick R. D. Hayford, diplomat, former Ghana Ambassador to South Africa (1997–1999), Director of African Affairs in the Executive Office of United Nations (UN) Secretary-General Kofi Annan (1999–2005)
- Philo Ikonya, author and human rights activist
- Wahu Kagwe, singer, actress, songwriter, entertainer
- Jacob Kaimenyi, former Cabinet Secretary Education, Lands & Natural resources. Academicians
- Eunice Wanjiku Kamaara, academic and religious studies scholar
- Michael Kamau, former Cabinet Secretary
- Sammy Douglas Waweru Kamau, politician
- Dr Jemimah Kariuki, gynaecologist
- Dr Thomas Kariuki, Director of Programmes at the African Academy of Sciences
- Maina Kiai, human rights activist and UN Special Rapporteur
- Stephen Kiama, Vice-Chancellor, University of Nairobi
- Martha Koome, Chief Justice of Kenya
- Felix Koskei, former Cabinet Secretary
- Elijah Njoroge Kururia, Member of the National Assembly
- Joseph Ole Lenku, former Cabinet Secretary and Governor Kajiado County
- P. L. O. Lumumba, Professor of Law
- Wangari Maathai, Nobel peace prize laureate
- Emma Mbua, palaeo anthropologist and curator
- James Wainaina Macharia, Cabinet Secretary
- Fred Matiangi, Cabinet Secretary
- Adan Mohammed, Cabinet Secretary
- Stephen Mogaka, Member of Parliament
- Musalia Mudavadi, former Vice President under President Moi, former Deputy Prime Minister to Rt Hon. Raila Odinga.
- Sylvia Mulinge, corporate executive
- Danson Mungatana, Lawyer and Politician
- Margaret Muthwii, Vice-Chancellor of Pan Africa Christian University
- Willy Mutunga, former Chief Justice of Kenya
- MaryJane Mwangi, corporate executive
- Ruth Wangari Mwaniki (born 1963 or 1964), member of parliament
- Rosalyn Nandwa, deputy chief of staff to William Ruto
- John Nasasira, Ugandan Cabinet Minister
- Alice Wairimu Nderitu (born 1968), United Nations Special Adviser on the Prevention of Genocide to UN Secretary-General
- Ruth W. Nduati, physician and HIV researcher
- Eva Njenga, physician and first female chair of Kenya Medical Practitioners and Dentists Board
- Freda Nkirote, archaeologist and Director of the British Institute in Eastern Africa (BIEA) and President of the Pan-African Archaeological Association.
- Apolo Nsibambi, Prime Minister of Uganda
- Sylvia Shitsama Nyamweya, neurosurgeon
- Borna Nyaoke-Anoke, physician and medical researcher
- Catherine Nyongesa, physician and radiation oncologist
- Washington Yotto Ochieng, Professor of Engineering at Imperial College London
- Florence Oloo, scientist and professor of chemical sciences
- Troy Onyango, writer and lawyer
- James Orengo, long serving Kenyan legislator and senior counsel.
- Teodosia Osir, lawyer and corporate executive
- Babu Owino, politician
- Henry Rotich, former Finance Cabinet Secretary
- William Ruto, Fifth President of The Republic of Kenya.
- Stephen Sang, constitutional lawyer and the Second Governor of Nandi County
- Josephine Sinyo, lawyer, politician and disability rights activist
- Anne Waiguru, former Cabinet Secretary, and Governor of Kirinyaga County.
- Immaculate Wambua, diplomat, High Commissioner of the Republic of Kenya to Canada
- Hassan Wario, anthropologist, former Cabinet Secretary, Kenya and serving Kenyan ambassador.

== See also ==
- University of Newcastle, Australia
- University of Nottingham
- University of Northampton
- List of universities in Kenya
- Education in Kenya
