= Nyamira County =

Coordinates: 0°45′S 35°00′E

- County
- Flag

- Location in Kenya
- Country: Kenya
- Formed: 4 March 2013
- Capital: Nyamira
- Sub-counties: List: Borabu; Manga; Masaba North; Nyamira North; Nyamira South

Government
  - Governor: Amos Nyaribo
  - Deputy Governor: James Gesami

Area
  - Total: 912.5 km^{2} (352.3 sq mi)

Population (2019)
  - Total: 605,576
  - Density: 663.6/km^{2} (1,719/sq mi)
- Time zone: UTC+3 (EAT)
- Website: www.nyamira.go.ke

Nyamira County is a county in the former Nyanza Province of Kenya. Formally a district, Nyamira was hived off Kisii District in 1989, and it shares a common boundary with what was known as Nyamira District. The main cash crops grown are bananas and tea. The county has a population of 605,576 (2019 census). Its capital and largest town is Nyamira, with an urban population of around 41,668 (2009 census) The county is also referred to as North Kisii.

Nyamira County borders Kisii County to the East, Bomet and Kericho counties to the West and Homa Bay County to the North.

== Physical and topical features ==
The County lies between 1,250 and 2,100 m (4,100 and 6,890 ft) above sea level. Permanent rivers include Sondu, Eaka, Kijauri, Kemera, Charachani, Gucha (Kuja), Bisembe, Mogonga, Chirichiro, Ramacha and Egesagane and all of them drain water to Lake Victoria.

== Climatic conditions ==
The county has a temperature range between 10 and 28.7 °C (50.0 and 83.7 °F). Annual rainfall ranges between 1,200 and 2,100 mm (47 and 83 in). Long rains start from December to June and short rain seasons from June and July to November.

== Demographics ==
The county has a population of 605,576 of which 290,907 are male, 314,656 are female, and 13 who are intersex. There are 150,669 households spawning an average size of 4.0 persons per household and a population density of 675 inhabitants per square kilometre (1,750/sq mi)

=== Religion ===
Religion in Nyamira County

Religion (2019 Census)	Number
Catholicism	152,888
Protestant	326,691
Evangelical Churches	90,004
African instituted Churches	12,789
Orthodox	762
Other Christian	10,249
Islam	554
Hindu	16
Traditionists	206
Other	5,341
No Religion/Atheists	3,347
Don't Know	176
Not Stated	28

== Administrative and political units ==
=== Administrative units ===
There are 5 sub counties, 4 electoral constituencies, 14 divisions, 46 locations and 114 sub-locations.

==== Sub counties ====
- Nyamira North
- Nyamira South
- Borabu
- Masaba North
- Manga

==== Electoral constituencies ====
It has four constituencies and 20 county assembly wards,

- West Mugirango constituency
- Kitutu Masaba constituency
- North Mugirango constituency
- Borabu constituency

=== Political leadership ===
John Obiero Nyangarama was the Governor serving his last term in office after being elected twice 2013, 2017 and his deputy Amos Kimwomi Nyaribo is the current governor . Mogeni Erick Okong’o is the current Senator and the first senator in 2013 to 2017 was Kennedy Mong'are Okong'o. Jerusha Mongina Momanyi is the women representative and was elected in 2017 after winning against the Alice Chae who was the first women representative for the county.

For Nyamira County, the County Executive Committee comprises:-

County Executive Committee
	Number
The Governor	1
The Deputy Governor	1
The County Secretary	1
The CEC Members	10
Total	13

== Health ==
There is a total of 532 health facilities in the county with one county referral hospital. The county has 610 health personnel of different cadre.

HIV prevalence is at 6.4% above the national average of 5.3% (Kenya HIV Estimates 2015).

== Transport and communication ==
The county is covered by 388 km of road network. of this 388 km is covered by earth surface, 208 km is murram surface.

There are five post offices and 15 sub post offices, 800 installed letter boxes, 700 rented letter boxes and 100 vacant letter boxes.

== Trade and commerce ==
There are 49 trading centres, 2049 registered businesses, 1641 licensed retail traders and 42 supermarkets.

The county is part of the Lake Region Economic Bloc (LREB) established in 2018 to foster regional economic, industrial, social, and technological collaboration.

== County subdivisions ==
Local authorities (councils)
Authority	Type	Population*	Urban pop.*
Nyamira	Town	65,633	9,971
Nyansiongo	Town	35,413	3,692
Nyamira county	County	397,056	0
Total	-	498,102	13,663
* 1999 census. Source:

Administrative divisions
Division	Population*	Urban pop.*	Headquarters
Borabu	58,079	3,241	Nyansiongo
Ekerenyo	133,967	0	
Manga	75,996	0	Manga
Nyamira	133,920	9,559	Nyamira
Rigoma	96,140	3,395	
Total	498,102	16,195	-
* 1999 census. Sources: , ,

== See also ==
- Nsunera
