= North Mugirango Constituency =

Kenyan electoral constituency

North Mugirango
- constituency for the Parliament of Kenya
- County: Nyamira County

Current constituency
- Created: 1963
- Party: UDA
- Member of Parliament: Joash Nyamoko

North Mugirango is one of four constituencies in Nyamira County. In 1966, then within the former Kisii District, North Mugirango Constituency was split into West Mugirango and a smaller North Mugirango. The name was changed to Borabu / North Mugirango Constituency in 1974. In 1987 the name changed back to North Mugirango. Prior to 2013, it was formally known as North Mugirango (Borabu) Constituency after which Borabu constituency was hived off, hence its reversion to the name Mugirango Constituency.

== Members of Parliament ==
Elections	MP	Party	Notes
1963	Thomas Masaki	KANU	One-party system
1966	Joseph Nyaberi	KANU	One-party system
1969	Livingstone Marita	KANU	One-party system
1974	Livingstone Marita	KANU	One-party system
1979	Livingstone Marita	KANU	One-party system
1983	Livingstone Marita	KANU	One-party system.
1988	Nyarangi Moturi	KANU	One-party system.
1992	Livingstone Marita	KANU	
1997	Joseph Ombasa	KANU	
2002	Godfrey Masanya	Ford-People	
2007	Wilfred Ombui	KANU	
2013	Charles Geni	ODM	
2017	Joash Nyamoko	Jubilee Party	
2022	Joash Nyamoko	UDA	

== 2027 general election ==
As of October 2026, several individuals had been identified as prospective candidates for the North Mugirango parliamentary seat in the 2027 Kenyan general election. They included the incumbent Member of Parliament, Joash Nyamoko, and prospective challengers Micah Nyabiba Asamba, Isaac Nyang'au Atebe, Wakili Kiriago Jr., and Daniel Amenya. The electoral platform My Leader Kenya listed Asamba as an independent aspirant, Kiriago under the Jubilee Party, and Amenya under the People's Party of Kenya.

Micah Nyabiba Asamba is a Kenyan researcher, university lecturer, published scientist and Director of Keynea Research & Analytics Limited, a research consultancy based in Nairobi. His academic background is in microbiology, with research interests extending to environmental science, agricultural microbiology, water quality and applied research methods. He has authored and co-authored scientific papers published in peer-reviewed journals. His publications include research on the molecular characterisation of chlorpyrifos-degrading bacteria in Heliyon (2022), a study of seasonal water-quality variations in Nairobi County published in Applied Water Science (2026), and a review of metal–organic frameworks for PFAS removal published in the Journal of Hazardous Materials Advances (2026).

Before his parliamentary aspirations, Asamba had also reported involvement in electoral observation and civic activities. His profile on the ACE Electoral Knowledge Network refers to election observation and identifies voter education, electoral management, boundary delimitation, vote counting, voter registration, election technology and youth participation among his areas of expertise. The profile also describes his involvement in community mobilisation and youth leadership. Asamba was subsequently listed by My Leader Kenya as an independent prospective parliamentary candidate for North Mugirango in 2027.

Joash Nyamache Nyamoko, the incumbent Member of Parliament, has represented North Mugirango since 2017. He was elected on a Jubilee Party ticket in 2017 and re-elected under the United Democratic Alliance (UDA) in 2022. Before entering the National Assembly, Nyamoko served as Speaker of the Nyamira County Assembly from 2013 to 2017. His parliamentary interests include infrastructure, budgeting and public finance. He received 15,351 votes in the 2022 parliamentary election.

Isaac Nyang'au Atebe contested the North Mugirango parliamentary seat in the 2022 general election under the United Progressive Alliance (UPA). He finished second behind Nyamoko, receiving 9,933 votes according to KenyaTally's constituency results. Atebe was subsequently reported by Gusii Digital News to have expressed his intention to challenge Nyamoko again in 2027.

Wakili Kiriago Jr. was listed as a prospective parliamentary candidate affiliated with the Jubilee Party. His aspirant profile identified youth leadership, infrastructure development and accountability in the management of public resources among his political priorities.

Daniel Amenya was also listed by My Leader Kenya as a prospective parliamentary aspirant under the People's Party of Kenya. However, separate electoral listings identified a similarly named individual, Daniel Amenya Amenya Ebunda, as a prospective candidate in South Mugirango Constituency, leaving the North Mugirango listing unconfirmed.

As of October 2026, these prospective candidacies had not been finalised through the formal nomination and clearance processes of the Independent Electoral and Boundaries Commission (IEBC).

== Wards ==
Prior to 2013, North Mugirango Borabu Constituency had thirteen wards: Bomwagamo, Central, Ekerenyo, Ensakia, Esise, Kiangeni, Kiabonyoru, Mageri, Magwagwa, Manga, Matutu, Mekenene and Nyaramba. However, ward boundaries and some of the names were revised to: Bomwagamo, Bokeira, Ekerenyo, Itibo and Magwagwa. The most popular aspirant MP, Micah Asamba, comes from Itibo ward, where he has popular support.

== Nyamira North Sub-county ==
Nyamira North Sub-county shares common boundaries with North Mugirango Constituency. The sub-county is headed by the Deputy County Commissioner under the Ministry of Interior and National Government.
