= West Mugirango Constituency =

Electoral constituency in Kenya

West Mugirango
- constituency for the Parliament of Kenya
- County: Nyamira County

Current constituency
- Created: 1966
- Created from: North Mugirango

West Mugirango Constituency is an electoral constituency in Kenya. It is one of four constituencies of Nyamira County. The constituency was established for the 1966 elections from what was the larger North Mugirango Constituency. Its economy relies on agriculture and therefore good roads to transport goods.

== Members of Parliament ==
Elections	MP	Party	Notes
1966	Thomas Mong'are	KANU	One-party system
1966	Joseph Osero	KANU	By-election. One-party system
1969	Joseph Morara	KANU	One-party system
1970	Benson Kegoro Ogero	KANU	By-election. One-party system
1974	Sospeter Mageto	KANU	One-party system
1979	Benson Ogero	KANU	One-party system
1983	David Onyancha	KANU	One-party system.
1988	David Onyancha	KANU	One-party system.
1992	Henry Obwocha	Ford-Kenya	multi-party system
1997	Henry Obwocha	Ford-Kenya	multi-party system
2002	Henry Obwocha	Ford-People	multi-party system
2007	James Ondicho Gesami	ODM	multi-party system
2013	James Ondicho Gesami	ODM	multi-party system
2017	Vincent Mogaka	FORD-K	multi-party system
2022	Stephen Mogaka	Jubilee Party	multi-party system

== Wards ==
Prior to 2013, West Mugirango Constituency had twelve wards: Kebirigo, Nyamira, Rangenyo, Sironga, part of Bogichora, part of Bonyamatuta, Gesiaga, Keera, Miruka-Nyamaiya, Motagara and Sironga. However, ward boundaries and some of the names were revised to five, namely: Bogichora, Bonyamatuta, Bosamaro, Nyamaiya and Township.

== Nyamira South Sub-county ==
Nyamira South Sub-county shares common boundaries with West Mugirango Constituency. The sub-county is headed by the Deputy County Commissioner under the Ministry of Interior and National Government.
