= County Government of Nandi =

The County Government of Nandi is one of the county governments of the 47 counties of Kenya as established by the Constitution of Kenya enacted in 2010. The county government is led by the County Governor, his deputy and 10 County Executive Committee members as provided for in the Constitution of Kenya. The first County Governor of Nandi County was Dr. Cleophas Lagat and the first Deputy Governor was Dominic Chepyagan. The Second Governor is H.E Honourable Stephen Kipyego Sang and The Second Deputy Governor is H.E Honourable Yulita Chebotip Mitei. The Constitution of Kenya also provides for legislative house for each county. For the period between March 4, 2014 and the date of the next General election in Kenya, the Nandi County Assembly shall have a Speaker, representatives of the 30 wards of Nandi County and other nominated members representing women, the youth and the disabled members of the society as provided for in the Constitution of Kenya.

Main office-holders
| Office | Name | Party | Since |
|---|---|---|---|
| Governor | Hon Stephen Sang | Jubilee Party | August 7, 2017 |
| Deputy Governor | Dr. Yulitta Mitei | Jubilee Party | August 7, 2017 |
| Honorable Speaker | Mr. Joshua Kiptoo Cherwon | | |

The County Government has ten County Executive Committee (CEC) members per the requirement of Constitution of Kenya 2010 that requires the number of members of the executive authority of each county on the CEC to be ten, or a third of the number of wards in a county that has less than thirty wards. Nandi County has thirty wards each represented by a Member of County Assembly (MCA) as per the Constitution and nine nominated members, down from the initial eighteen nominated MCAs during the period between March 27, 2013 and August 8, 2017. These nominated members are: The six women representatives nominated by major political parties represented by elected members in order to comply with the restriction of the Constitution of Kenya that no more than two-thirds of the members be of one gender in any legislative assembly or appointive positions, two other representative of the youth and another one member representing the both marginalized and disabled persons. The speaker was elected by the MCAs.

Achievements

Nandi County now produces approximately 120,000,000 litres of milk annually translating to billions of shillings in income to our farmers. This is after the County Government embarked on provision of acaricides to 200 cattle dips as a way of putting tick-borne diseases at bay and employing 40 dip supervisors to assist in management of cattle dips as a way of professionalizing the management of these crucial facilities in animal keeping. The county government has successfully implemented the first phase of routine road maintenance targeting 450 km; 15 km in each ward and additional 276.2 km that were subjected to a competitive tender. The whole undertaking involved culvert installation, murraming, graveling, unblocking of drainage and heavy bush clearing. The setting of a public university in the County dubbed as Koitalel Arap Samoei University is now at an advance stage.

Controversies

There were reports by sections of the Kenyan mass media that the county government tortured civil society groups in an aborted demonstration against its leadership. There were also reported protests against the leadership of the County Government of Nandi in February 2015. In Nandi, some contractors marched to the governor's office, protesting that they had been denied an opportunity to do business with the county.
