= Stephen Mogaka =

Kenyan lawyer and politician

Stephen Mogaka MP
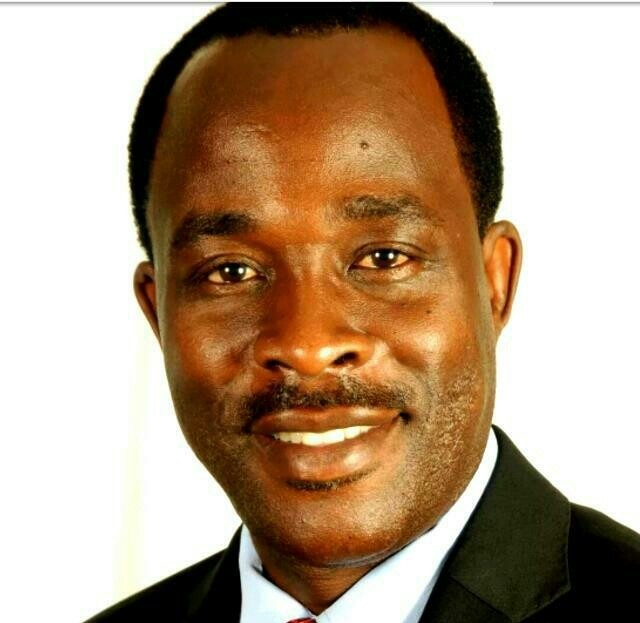
- Official 2022 portrait

Member of the Kenyan Parliament for West Mugirango
- Incumbent
- Assumed office 8 September 2022
- Preceded by: Vincent Kemosi Mogaka

Personal details
- Party: Jubilee Party
- Website: Parliamentary website

Stephen K. Mogaka is a Kenyan politician serving as a member of the National Assembly representing West Mugirango.

== Biography ==
Mogaka graduated from Ruiru High School in 1980, and Kagumo High School in 1982. He earned a Bachelors of Communication from University of Nairobi in 1987. He earned a diploma in legal studies from the Kenya School of Law in 2004. He has worked as a lawyer and a banker before entering politics.

== National Assembly ==
Shortly after his election, he launched a scholarship initiative for students in his constituency. In December 2023, Mogaka filed a petition at the High Court which resulted in a temporary pause of the prosecution of the Controller of Budget, Margaret Nyakang'o. Mogaka was ranked by poll in 2024 the most popular lawmaker from Nyamira County. He is known for his uncompromising attitude towards government competency, expecting the best work for his constituents.
