= Christian Medical Fellowship =

- Founded: 1949
- Location: (United Kingdom) Southwark, London, UK
- Region served: International
- Members: 4350 doctors, 980 medical students
- Employees: 15
- Volunteers: 51
- Website: http://www.cmf.org.uk/
- Registered Charity number: 1039823

The Christian Medical Fellowship (CMF), founded in 1949, is an evangelical, interdenominational organisation for Christian doctors, medical students, nurses and midwives in the United Kingdom. The organisation campaigns for and promotes traditional Christian values within the British medical sector, and publishes two journals, Triple Helix (for doctors) and Nucleus (for students), several smaller publications, and some books. CMF organises local and national conferences and promotes and supports Christian medical mission overseas.

CMF is linked to similar organisations in many countries through the International Christian Medical and Dental Association and the Universities and Colleges Christian Fellowship for its medical students.

== Medical ethics ==
CMF regularly contributes to debate on issues of medical ethics, such as making submissions to the UK House of Lords enquiry into physician-assisted suicide, and is opposed to legal access to abortion and euthanasia in the United Kingdom. In some of these activities, CMF works together with other faith-based and non-faith-based groups, such as the Care Not Killing Alliance and the Lawyers' Christian Fellowship.

The position of the Christian Medical Fellowship has been to actively encourage doctors and medical students to use opportunities arising from the doctor–patient relationship to discuss faith with patients.

== Criticism ==
The Christian Medical Fellowship has been the subject of complaints from several Hindu leaders to the House of Lords Select Committee on Religious Offences objecting to a claim that Hinduism was a "false religion".

In October 2007, the Christian Medical Fellowship was accused by The Guardian newspaper of attempting to skew the balance of evidence presented at the Parliamentary review of the UK's laws on abortion due to a number of its members presenting evidence at the Parliamentary Select Committee without revealing their membership and seniority within the organisation. The members concerned stated that they were submitting evidence as individuals, not as representatives of CMF, and they declared their affiliation when asked to do so in an unusual step by the Committee.

== See also ==
- Association of American Physicians and Surgeons
- Lawyers' Christian Fellowship
- International Christian Medical and Dental Association
