= Dal Grauer =

Canadian businessman (1906–1961)

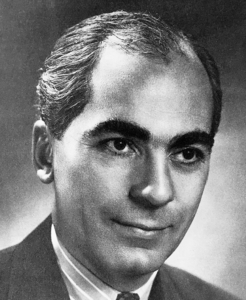
A. E. "Dal" Grauer

Albert Edward "Dal" Grauer (1906–1961) was a prominent Canadian businessman, economist, scholar and intellectual.

== Early life and education ==
Grauer was born on his family's dairy farm in the area of Eburne, British Columbia, then located on Sea Island and now part of Richmond, British Columbia. He was one of nine surviving children of Johann Jakob (John) Grauer and Marie Neth Grauer, who emigrated from Germany. The family moved to Vancouver when he was six. He attended the then Model School and King Edward High School, both in Vancouver. Although his first name was Albert, Grauer was known as Dal. The nickname arose out of a high school French class. When a teacher used the phrase "le livre d'Albert", his brothers decided "Dalbert" was French for Albert, and began to call him Dal.

Grauer graduated from high school in Vancouver at age 15. He graduated from the University of British Columbia (UBC) at age 19 in 1925, earning a BA in economics with first class honours. He was president of the university's Students' Council. Grauer competed in basketball and lacrosse while at UBC. Along with his brother Carl Grauer, he was a member of the Canadian Lacrosse Team at the 1928 Olympic Games in Amsterdam.

After UBC, he began a teaching fellowship at the University of California at Berkeley while working towards a PhD in economics. While there, he was awarded a Rhodes Scholarship to the University of Oxford, where he studied law at the University College. He was captain of the Lacrosse Team at Oxford. He completed his Berkeley PhD in economics while at Oxford, and at the same time earned a baccalaureate in jurisprudence from Oxford in 1928.

He articled with the firm of E. P. Davis & Co. in Vancouver and was called to the bar in early 1931.

== Career ==
In 1931, he accepted an offer to lecture in economics and political science at the University of Toronto. By 1937, at the age of 31, he became a full professor at the University of Toronto and headed its Department of Social Science. It was reported he was the youngest full professor in Canada at the time.

From 1937 to 1938, he acted as an expert consultant on social welfare, social insurance, housing and labour legislation to the Rowell–Sirois Royal Commission on Dominion–Provincial Relations.

He left the University of Toronto in 1939 to become the general secretary of the BC Electric Company, a major private utility in British Columbia. By 1946, Grauer became the president and chairman of BC Electric. He remained in that role until his death.

Between 1955 and 1957, he served as a member of the Royal Commission on Canada's Economic Prospects, chaired by Walter Gordon.

Grauer was noted for setting the course of a $650-million post-war expansion of BC Electric, making it one of the most successful private utility companies in North America. During his tenure, hydro-electric generation in British Columbia tripled. He spearheaded the transfer of natural gas from the province's Peace River region to the Lower Mainland and the creation of an underwater transmission cable to Vancouver Island.

While he was head of BC Electric, he commissioned the construction of a new headquarters for the company dubbed "Grauer's Tower". As of 2026, it is a Vancouver heritage building, significant for its aesthetic values and its role in making Modernist design prominent in the city in the 1960s.

On the day of Grauer's funeral, August 1, 1961, the BC provincial government announced it was expropriating BC Electric to make it a publicly owned utility. It became a crown corporation known as BC Hydro.

== Community ==
In 1957, he became chancellor and chair of the Board of Governors of the University of British Columbia. The Dal Grauer Memorial Lectureship at UBC was created in his memory, in 1966. He was involved in numerous community activities, including as chairman of the board of trustees of Vancouver General Hospital and three terms as president of the Vancouver Symphony Orchestra.

He was also director of numerous companies and organizations, including Sun Life Assurance, the Royal Bank, Montreal Trust and MacMillan Bloedel.

In 1957, he was named Canadian Businessman of the Year and, a year later, was awarded the Human Relations Award from the Canadian Council of Christians and Jews (later the Canadian Centre for Diversity and Inclusion).

== Personal life ==
Grauer married artist Shirley Woodward in Vancouver in 1933 at the city's Christ Church Cathedral. Woodward was known for her scholarship as well as being a fine artist.

Grauer was described as an avid reader and an accomplished pianist. He was said to have a dry sense of humour and sometimes enjoyed playing chess.

Grauer died of leukemia at age 55 in July 1961. His death was reported on the front page of the Vancouver newspapers; one account said he was considered by many to have been British Columbia's most brilliant native son. ^{[2]}

He had six children; one of his daughters, Sherrard (Sherry) Grauer, became an artist.
