= The Nairobi Hospital =

Private Nairobi hospital founded in 1954

Coordinates: 01°17′46″S 36°48′17″E

Geography
- Location: Upper Hill, Nairobi, Kenya

Organisation
- Care system: NHIF
- Type: General Medical Services
- Affiliated university: The Nairobi Hospital College of Health Sciences

Services
- Emergency department: Yes
- Beds: 355+ (2016); 750 (Planned)

History
- Founded: 9 April 1954; 72 years ago

Links
- Website: thenairobihosp.org
- Other links: List of hospitals in Kenya

The Nairobi Hospital is a private hospital located in Upper Hill area, Nairobi, Kenya.The hospital was founded in 1954 as the European Hospital, a hospital for Europeans.

== Location ==
It is located along Argwings Kodhek Road, Upper Hill, Nairobi. The hospital is located approximately 3 kilometres (2 mi) west of Kenyatta International Conference Centre. The geographical coordinates of the hospital are 01°17'46.0"S, 36°48'17.0"E (Latitude:-1.296115; Longitude:36.804718).

== Overview ==
The Nairobi Hospital was established to replace the smaller older Nairobi European Hospital (1902), that had become too small, as the new European Hospital. The institution was officially opened on 9 April 1954, as an exclusively European Hospital, in Kenya, which was then a colony of the United Kingdom. On 19 October 1961, it began serving non-Europeans and the name was changed to The Nairobi Hospital.

As of May 2026 the hospital is owned by the Kenya Hospital Association (KHA). The hospital's total assets were valued at approximately KES:12 billion (US$94 million, at that time).

== See also ==
- List of hospitals in Kenya
- Borna Nyaoke-Anoke, physician and medical researcher
