= Kenya Medical Practitioners and Dentists Board =

The Kenya Medical Practitioners and Dentists Council is a statutory body which regulates the training and practice of medicine, dentistry and community oral health in Kenya.
