= Kenyatta National Hospital =

Coordinates: 01°18′04″S 36°48′26″E

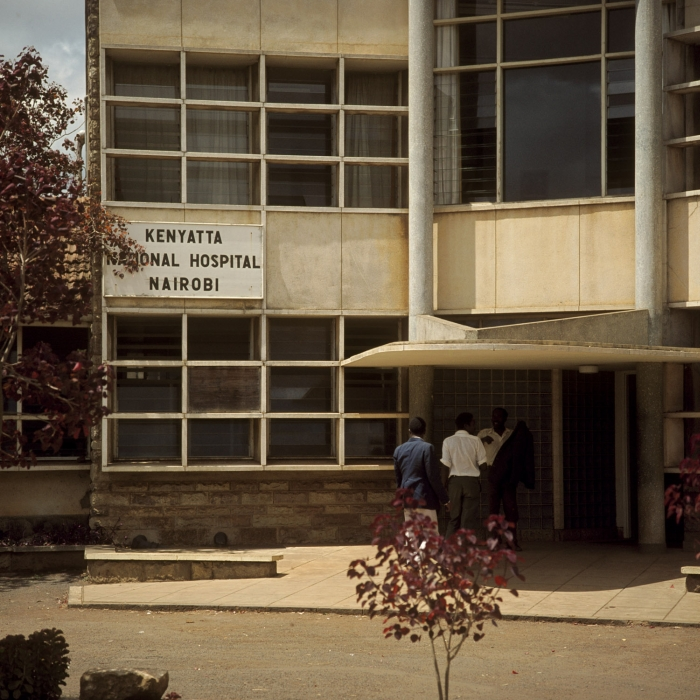

Geography
- Location: Hospital Road, Upper Hill, Nairobi, Kenya

Organisation
- Care system: Social Health Authorit (SHA)
- Type: General Medical and Surgical Services
- Affiliated university: Public

Services
- Emergency department: Yes
- Beds: 1,800

History
- Founded: 1901; 125 years ago

Links
- Website: Homepage
- Lists: Hospitals in Kenya
- Other links: List of hospitals in Kenya

The Kenyatta National Hospital is the oldest hospital in Nairobi, Kenya which was established In 1901 as the Native Civil Hospital but later changed in 1963 to Kenyatta National Hospital. It is a public, tertiary, referral hospital for the Ministry of Health. It is also the teaching hospital of the University of Nairobi College of Health Sciences. It is the largest hospital in the country and East Africa as well.

== Location ==
The hospital is located in the area to the immediate west of Upper Hill in Nairobi, the capital and largest city of Kenya. Its location is about 3.5 kilometres (2 mi) west of the city's central business district. The hospital complex measures 45.7 acres (18.5 ha).

== History ==
KNH was founded as the Native Civil hospital, in 1901 with a bed capacity of 40. In 1952 it was renamed the King George VI Hospital, after King George VI of the United Kingdom. At that time the settler community was served by the nearby European Hospital (now Nairobi Hospital). The facility was renamed Kenyatta National Hospital, after Jomo Kenyatta, following independence from the British.

== Capacity and size ==
It is currently the largest referral and teaching hospital in the country. Kenyatta National Hospital employs over 6,000 staff and has a bed capacity of 1,800. However, due to congestion, the patient numbers can rise as high as 3,000.

== Administration ==
The hospital is administered by a 10-person board of directors, chaired by George Ooko, a non-physician, non-executive board member. The current chief executive officer is Dr Richard Lesiyampe. The principal of the College of Health Sciences of the University of Nairobi and representatives from the Ministry of Finance and from the Ministry of Health, also sit on the board.

It also serves as a teaching hospital of the Kenya Medical Training College, Nairobi campus among many other institutions that are affiliated to the facility due to its advanced specialisation in medical services in the country and beyond.

KNH serves as the teaching hospital of the College of Health Sciences at the University of Nairobi.

== Notable staff ==
- Shitsama Nyamweya, neurosurgeon
- Jemimah Kariuki, gynaecologist

== See also ==
- List of hospitals in Kenya
- Ministry of Health (Kenya)
- Catherine Nyongesa
- List of Brutalist structures
