= Christian Medical and Dental Society =

The Christian Medical and Dental Society (CMDS) Canada is an evangelical, inter-denominational and active organization of Christian physicians in Canada. The original society was Christian Medical Society, established 1950 in Oak Park, Illinois. Raymond Knighton was the first Executive Director and Dr. C Everett Koop and Dr. Kenneth Geiser were the first two presidents. CMS developed the MAP (Medical Assistance Programs) ministry and obtained medicines and medical equipment donated by leading Pharmaceutical and Medical Equipment vendors and sent these much needed supplies to medical missionaries overseas. In this program medical students were enlisted, along with medical doctors to become STMs, Short-term Missionaries overseas. In 1964 the CMS became CMDS Christian Medical and Dental Society. John Buchanan was director of MAP and John Lepp, Kerry Zwaggerman and William Lipp were among the early staff. MAP has morphed to become MAP International. Medical and dental students organized as chapters in universities and colleges. Since its inception as MAP 50 billion dollars of resources have been sent to equip medical and dental personnel in providing healing ministries in near and far nations and respond to natural disasters. In response to the 2013 Oklahoma $250,000 personal needs items were sent. MAP INT representatives are often the first unit to respond to natural disasters, alongside of World Vision. CMSD has chapters in many states. Its official publication is Focus magazine.
