= Makueni District =

Former district in Kenya

Makueni District was an administrative district in the Eastern Province of Kenya. Its capital town was Wote. The district had a population of 771,545 (1999 census) and an area of 7,966 km^{2}.

Makueni District was hived off Machakos District in 1992. It was later split into four smaller districts of Makueni, Mbooni, Kibwezi and Nzaui. In the 2009 census, all the four districts had a population of 884,527.

In 2010, after the promulgation of the new constitution of Kenya, counties were to be created based on the districts of Kenya as at 1992. This effectively led to the creation of Makueni County.

Local authorities (councils)
| Authority | Type | Population* | Urban pop.* |
| Wote | Town | 56,419 | 5,542 |
| Mtito Andei | Town | 24,435 | 4,304 |
| Makueni | County | 690,691 | 18,689 |
| Total | - | 771,545 | 28,535 |
* 1999 census. Source:

Administrative divisions
| Division | Population* | Urban pop.* | Headquarters |
| Kaiti | 46,107 | 501 | Kilala |
| Kalawa | 14,039 | 0 | Kalawa |
| Kasikeu | 35,719 | 1,848 | Kasikeu |
| Kathonzweni | 65,738 | 0 | Kathonzweni |
| Kibwezi | 80,236 | 4,695 | Kibwezi |
| Kilome | 46,204 | 0 | Mukaa |
| Kilungu | 67,741 | 0 | Mukaa |
| Kisau | 50,510 | 1,905 | |
| Makindu | 50,299 | 2,482 | Makindu |
| Matiliku | 38,867 | 0 | Matiliku |
| Mbitini | 48,729 | 3,266 | Emali |
| Mbooni | 55,984 | 1,786 | Mbooni |
| Mtito Andei | 66,663 | 3,966 | Mtito Andei |
| Tulimani | 32,717 | 0 | |
| Wote | 40,353 | 4,708 | Wote |
| Total | 771,545 | 25,157 | - |
* 1999 census. Sources: , ,

The district had five constituencies:

- Mbooni Constituency
- Kilome Constituency
- Kaiti Constituency
- Makueni Constituency
- Kibwezi Constituency
