= Kibwezi Constituency =

Kenyan electoral constituency

Kibwezi Constituency was an electoral constituency in Kenya. It was one of five constituencies in Makueni District. The constituency was established for the 1988 elections. After the 2010 constitution, there were six constituencies set up in Makueni County, with Kibwezi Constituency being split into Kibwezi West Constituency and Kibwezi East Constituency.

The towns of Kibwezi, Makindu and Mtito Andei were located within this constituency.

== Members of Parliament ==
Elections	MP	Party	Notes
1988	Agnes Mutindi Ndetei	KANU	One-party system.
1992	Agnes Mutindi Ndetei	DP	
1997	Onesmus Mutinda Mboko	SDP	
2002	Richard Kalembe Ndile	NARC	
2007	Philip Kaloki	ODM-Kenya	

== Locations and wards ==
Locations
Location	Population*
Chyulu Hills Nat. Park	2
Kambu	11.642
Kiboko	9,933
Kikumbulyu	41,223
Kinyambu	8,370
Makindu	18,410
Masongaleni	24,283
Mtito Andei	24,368
Ngwata	11,797
Nguumo	25,189
Nthongoni	19,777
Nzambani	13,513
Tsavo West	12
Twaandu	7,658
Utithi	24,534
Total	x

Wards
Ward	Registered Voters	Local Authority
Ivingoni / Mang'elete	3,044	Mtito Andei town
Kambu	1,808	Mtito Andei town
Kathekani / Darajani	2,839	Mtito Andei town
Mtito Andei	2,052	Mtito Andei town
Kikumbulyu	12,427	Makueni County
Kinyambu	10,742	Makueni County
Makindu	13,711	Makueni County
Masongaleni	5,932	Makueni County
Mtito Andei East	7,711	Makueni County
Mtito Andei West	3,559	Makueni County
Twaandu / Kiboko	5,475	Makueni County
Total	69,300	
*September 2005.
