= List of cities in Kenya =

This is a list of cities and towns in Kenya.

== Cities and towns in Kenya ==
- Baragoi
- Bondo
- Bungoma
- Busia
- Butere
- Dadaab
- Diani Beach
- Eldoret
- Emali
- Embu
- Garissa
- Gede
- Gem
- Hola
- Homa Bay
- Isiolo
- Kitui
- Kibwezi
- Kajiado
- Kakamega
- Kakuma
- Kapenguria
- Kericho
- Keroka
- Kiambu
- Kilifi
- Kisii
- Kisumu
- Kitale
- Lamu
- Langata
- Litein
- Lodwar
- Lokichoggio
- Londiani
- Loyangalani
- Machakos
- Makindu
- Malindi
- Mandera
- Maralal
- Marsabit
- Meru
- Mombasa
- Moyale
- Mtwapa
- Mumias
- Muranga
- Mutomo
- Nairobi
- Naivasha
- Nakuru
- Namanga
- Nanyuki
- Naro Moru
- Narok
- Nyahururu
- Nyeri
- Ruiru
- Siaya
- Shimoni
- Takaungu
- Thika
- Ugunja
- Vihiga
- Voi
- Wajir
- Watamu
- Webuye
- Wote
- Wundanyi

== Gallery ==
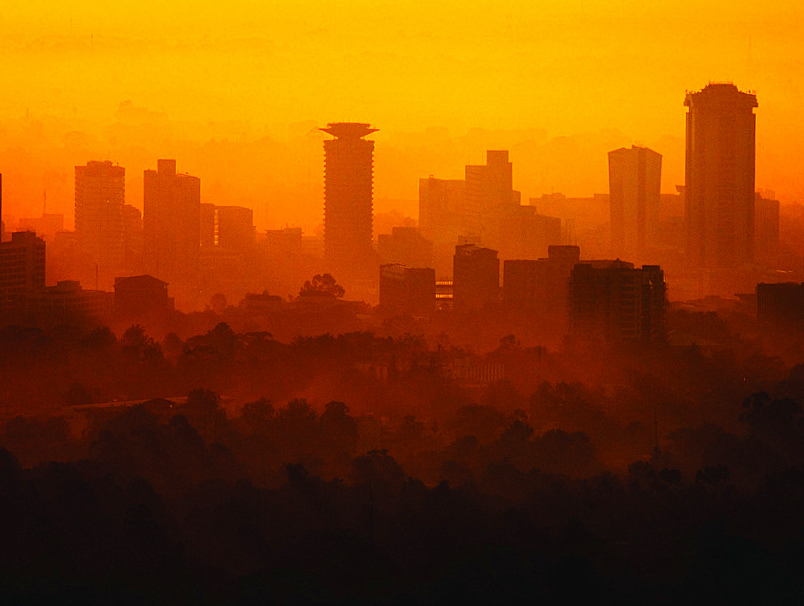
Nairobi, Kenya's capital and largest city

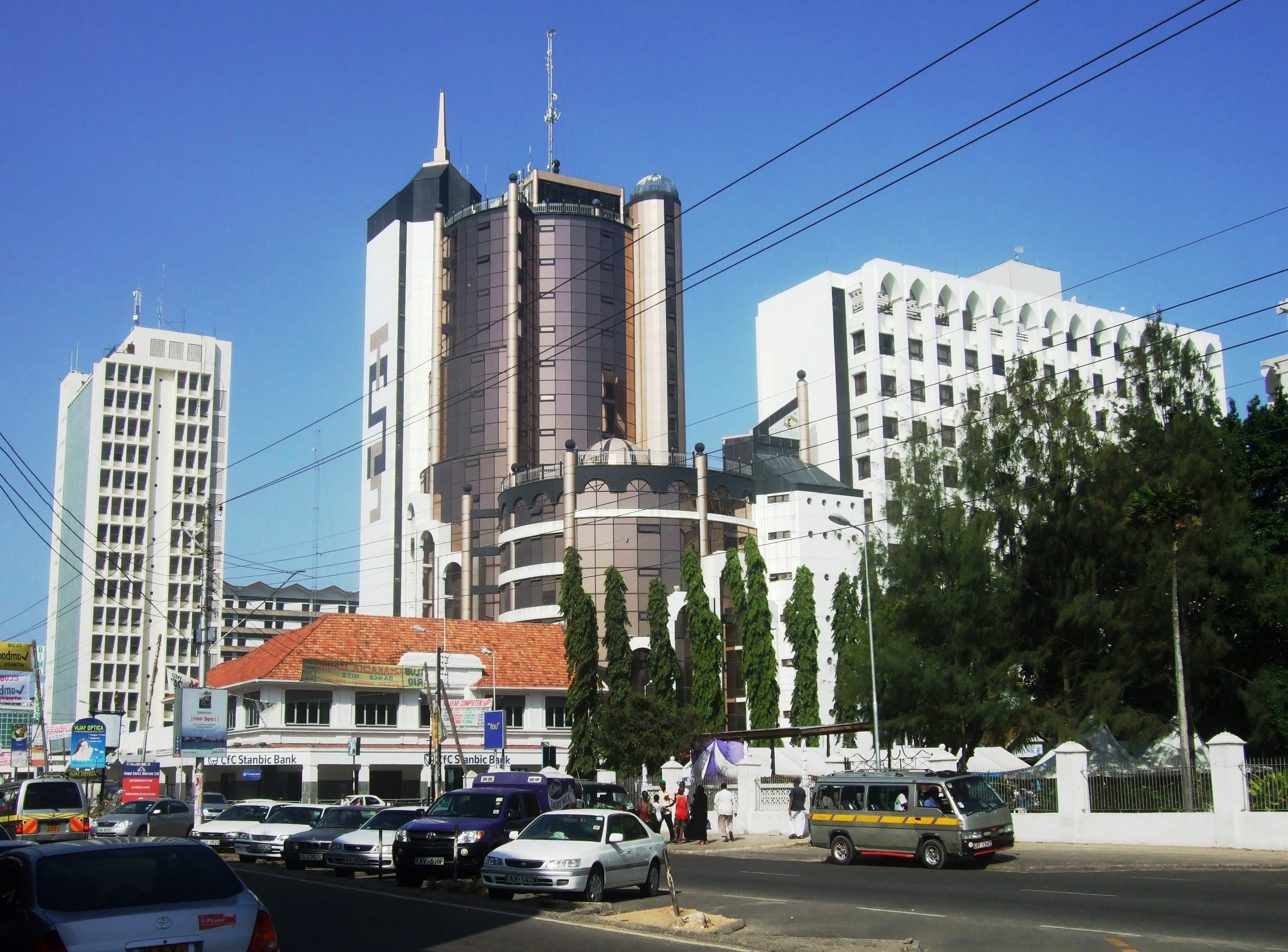
Mombasa, Kenya's oldest and second largest city

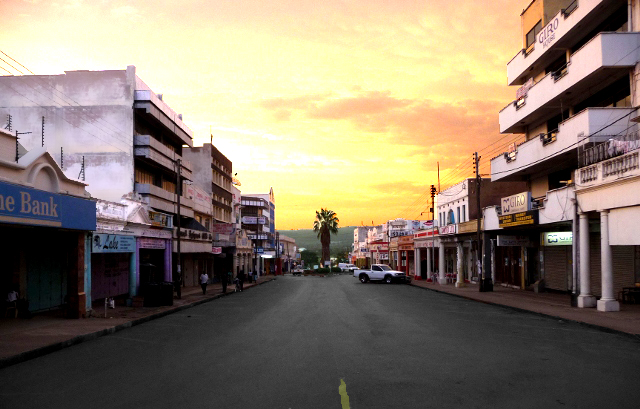
Kisumu, Kenya's third largest city

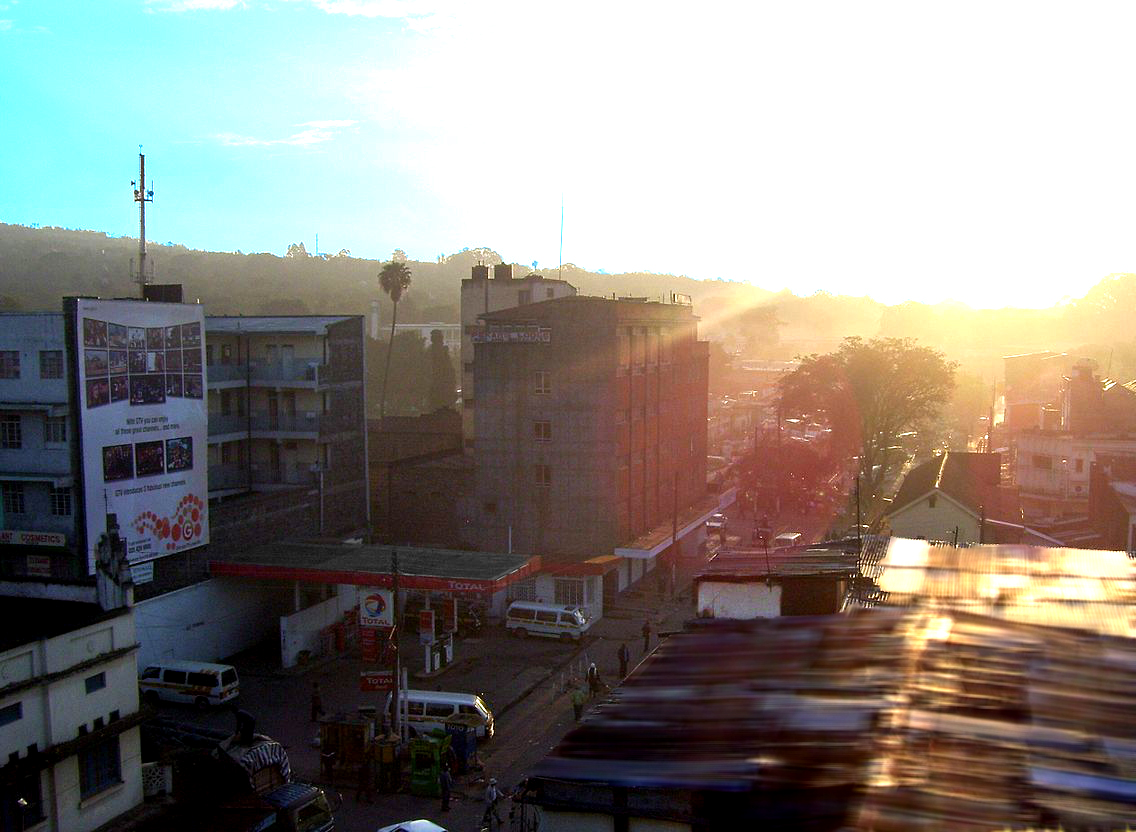
Nakuru, Kenya's fourth largest city.

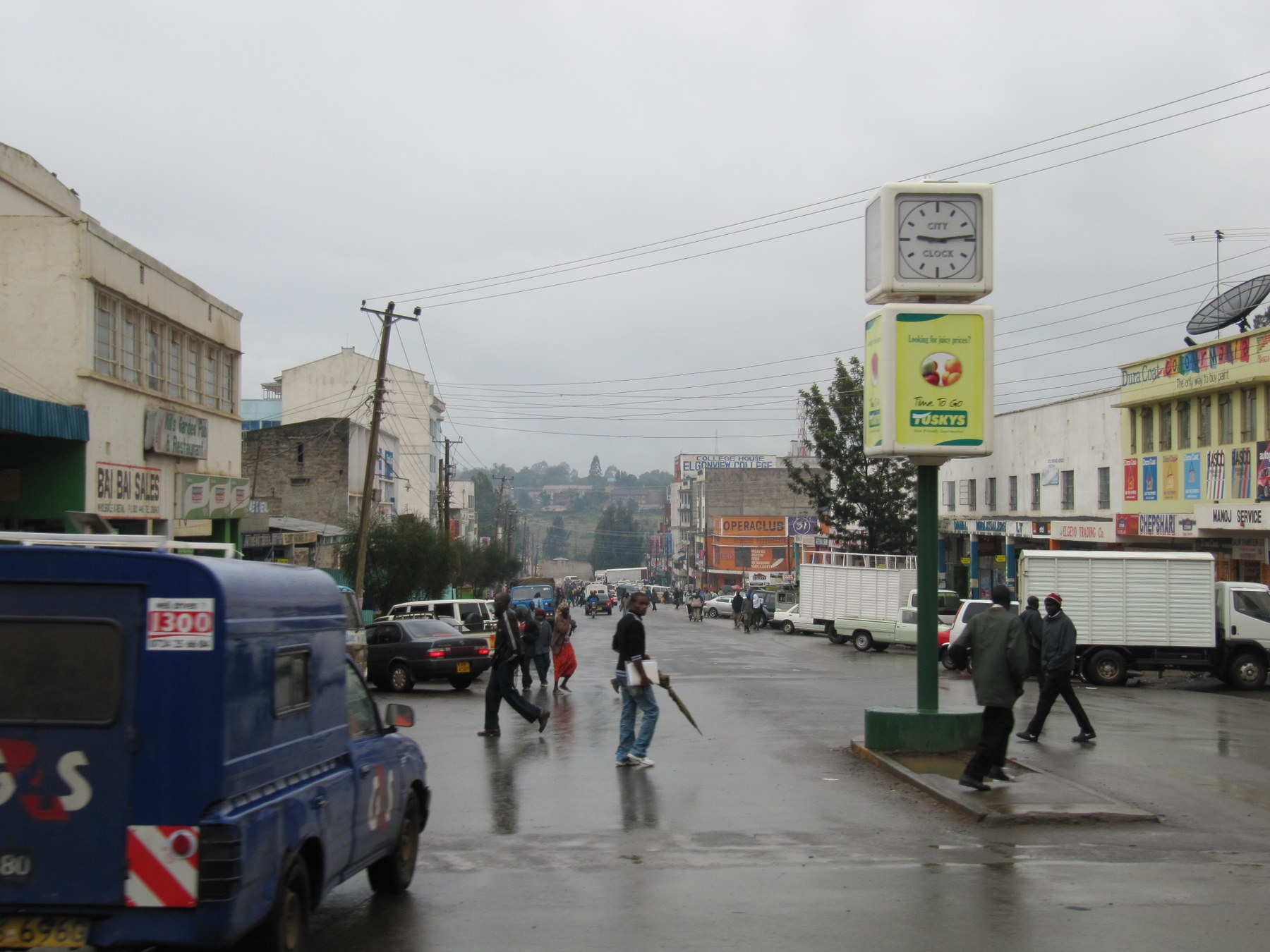
Eldoret, Kenya's Fifth largest city and largest in the North Region

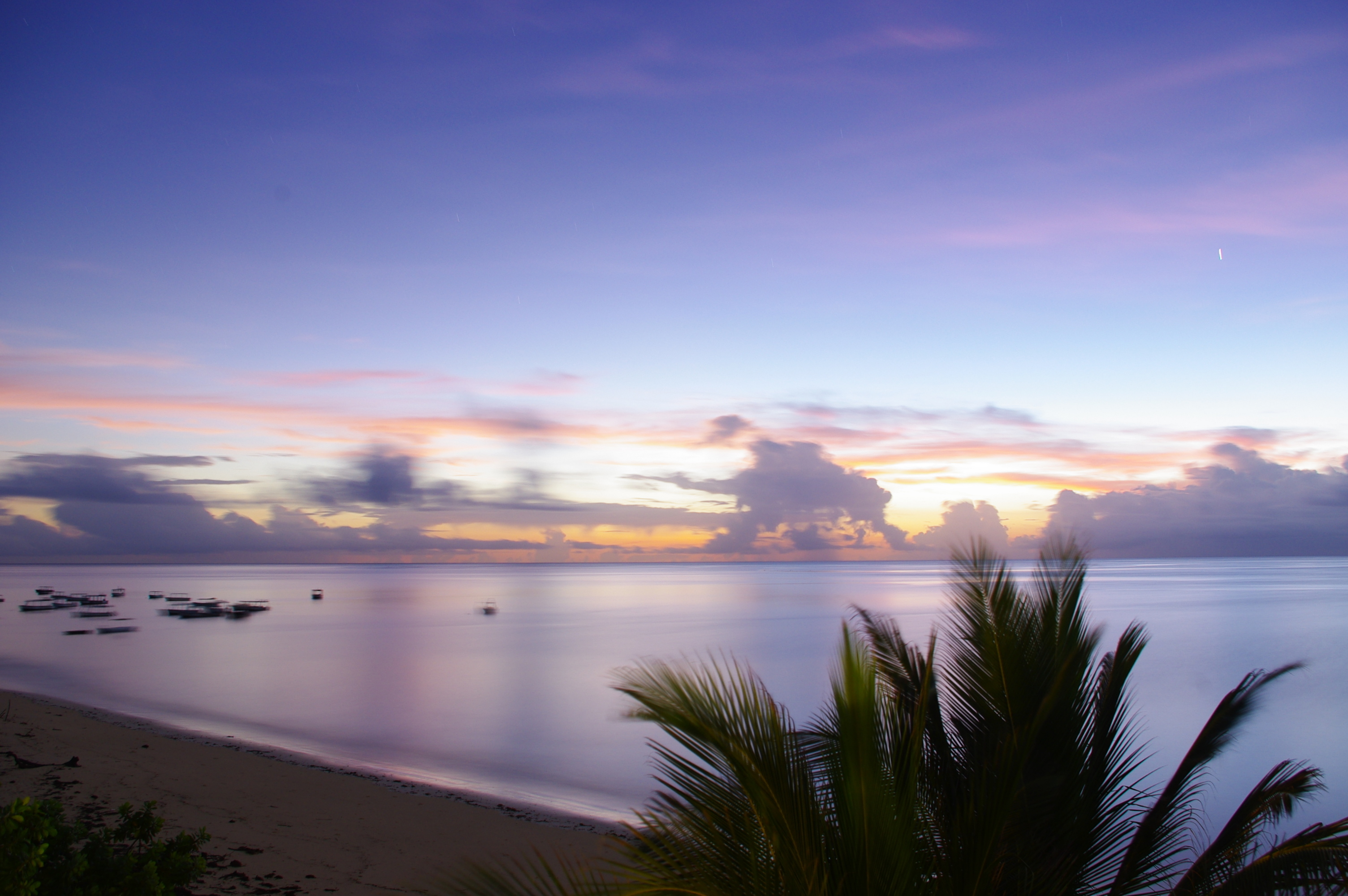
Malindi, the second largest urban centre in the Coastal Region

== See also ==
- List of cities and towns in Kenya by population
- Local authorities of Kenya
- History of Kenya
- List of cities in East Africa
