= 2013 Makueni local elections =

Local elections in Kenya

Local elections were held in Makueni County to elect a Governor and County Assembly on 4 March 2013. Under the new constitution, which was passed in a 2010 referendum, the 2013 general elections were the first in which Governors and members of the County Assemblies for the newly created counties were elected. They will also be the first general elections run by the Independent Electoral and Boundaries Commission(IEBC) which has released the official list of candidates.

== Gubernatorial election ==
Candidate	Running Mate	Coalition	Party	Votes
Kaloki, Philip Kyalo Kituti	Syumwenzwa, Mutisya Mutua		Wiper Democratic Movement – Kenya	--
Kibwana, Kivutha	Mwau, Adelina Ndeto		Muungano Party	--
Kilonzo, Peter Kavoo	Jackson Muema Mang'eng'e		Democratic Party	--
Maundu, Peter Eliud Mutua	Mbusya, Winfred Mueni		The Independent Party	--
Muthembwa, Cosmas Kyalo	Mativo, Jonathan Mwongela		Peoples Party of Kenya	--
Mutwii, Jones Mutuku	Wambua, Julius		Party of Independent Candidates of Kenya	--

== Prospective candidates ==
The following are some of the candidates who have made public their intentions to run:

- Phillip Kaloki - Kibwezi Constituency MP
- Professor Kivutha Kibwana - former Makueni Constituency MP and Advisor to President Mwai Kibaki
- Wilfred Ndolo - former PC
- Peter Maundu - former Makueni Constituency MP
- Mutua Syomwenzwa - Businessman
- Lieutenant General Jones Mutwii - retired army general
