= Death of Mutula Kilonzo =

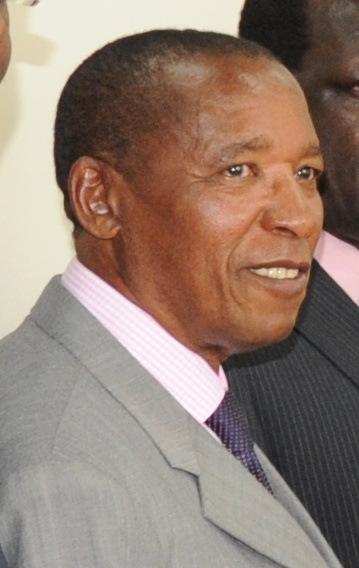
Kilonzo in 2009

On 27 April 2013, Kenyan politician and lawyer Mutula Kilonzo, who was serving as the first Senator of Makueni County, died at his ranch in Maanzoni, Machakos County. A requiem mass was held at the Nairobi Baptist Church in Nairobi on 8 May, followed by his burial at his home village in Makueni County, in line with his wishes.

A postmortem into Kilonzo's death found "serious internal bleeding characteristic with poisoning" according to reports. However, in late 2014, an inquest was launched after it emerged that toxicology samples to establish the source of the poisoning had been tampered with. In 2020, the inquest concluded that Kilonzo's death had not been due to foul play.

In June 2017, an official government report on Kilonzo's death was released, citing "massive haemorrhage into the chest and cranial cavity" as the cause of death.

== Background ==
Kilonzo was known as an outspoken politician who often criticized other political leaders. He received death threats in 2009 and 2012 from two different sources, while he withdrew a case against a third in February 2013 after it was found that the defendant's phone number was used by others to send threats via SMS.

On the day of Kilonzo's death, Senate Majority Leader Kithure Kindiki stated that Kilonzo "cut a solitary and almost sorrowful demeanor in the House" in the week leading up to his death. On 30 April, Machakos County Senator Johnstone Muthama claimed Kilonzo expressed fear for his life as the two had lunch with Kitui County Senator David Musila and former Prime Minister Raila Odinga in Nairobi five days earlier. Kilonzo's second widow Nduku recalled her husband expressing the same fear to her a day before his death while testifying to a Machakos court in October 2017.

Kilonzo was reported to have no history of illness, with his son Mutula Jr. telling a Machakos court in September 2017 that his father was "extremely fit". Kilonzo's workers told police that he was "in high spirits" when he went to bed the night before his death.

== Death ==
On 27 April 2013, Kilonzo was found dead in his bedroom at around 11 a.m. by his workers, who had earlier called out to him for breakfast to no response. Reports stated that he was found in bed with foam covering his mouth, while vomit was also found in his bathroom sink. News of his death was first reported to the media by his brother-in-law Chris Musau in the afternoon, while police officers secured the house to allow police investigators and a medical team to collect samples for analysis. The following week, new reports stated that Kilonzo had woken up in the early morning and spent about 30 minutes at his swimming pool, with an unnamed visitor said to have been questioned by police in the house.

On 8 May 2013, a requiem mass for Kilonzo was held at the Nairobi Baptist Church in Nairobi. He was buried on 9 May at Woyani village, his ancestral home in Makueni County, in line with his wishes.

=== Reaction ===
On 27 April 2013, former Vice President Kalonzo Musyoka reportedly broke down and cried upon receiving the news of Kilonzo's death while attending a burial in Kitui County. President Uhuru Kenyatta described Kilonzo as "one of the country's most brilliant minds, a principled politician and a renowned lawyer", while Deputy President William Ruto praised him as "an astute and dependable politician whose impact in the legal profession and in the democratisation of this country cannot be overemphasised". Former President Daniel arap Moi described Kilonzo as "an accomplished lawyer and a true servant of the people who freely gave with a smile."

On 28 April 2013, former President Mwai Kibaki praised Kilonzo as "an outstanding leader, resilient politician and a shrewd lawyer", noting the "pivotal role" he played in drafting the Constitution of Kenya enabled in 2010. Former Prime Minister Raila Odinga branded Kilonzo as "one of the most brilliant sons" of Kenya, adding that his political party, the Coalition for Reforms and Democracy (CORD), would miss his "capacity to think out of the box and to make simple issues that are otherwise extremely complex".

Former United Nations secretary-general Kofi Annan issued a statement on Kilonzo's death, stating that his legacy "will be his commitment to the reform agenda of Kenya, most especially constitutional and electoral reforms, and his steadfast pursuit of putting an end to impunity and upholding the rule of law".

== Aftermath ==
=== Autopsy ===
In May 2013, it was reported that 52 samples from Kilonzo's body, including from nails, hair, bone and skin tissue, saliva and urine, had been collected for analysis by pathologists. Detectives also collected samples from pieces of meat that Kilonzo had for dinner the night before his death, charcoal used to roast the meat, plates used to serve the food, water and two soft drinks. Pathologists at the scene were reported to have agreed on the cause of death, which was later reported as "serious internal bleeding characteristic with poisoning".

On 1 May 2013, an autopsy was conducted at the Lee Funeral Home in Nairobi by a team of seven pathologists, including British autopsy expert Ian Madison Calder, who was flown in at the Kilonzo family's request due to "history we have had in this country to clear any form of doubts" according to Machakos Senator Johnstone Muthama, who witnessed the autopsy. Government pathologist Johansen Oduor announced that all testing of samples would be conducted in Kenya, though Kilonzo's son Mutula Jr. later stated that samples obtained by Calder would be sent out of the country.

On 28 June 2017, an official government report on Kilonzo's death was presented at the Machakos Law Courts by Nakuru-based general practitioner S. W. Mwangi. The report stated that Kilonzo died of a "massive haemorrhage into the chest and cranial cavity due to significantly elevated blood pressure due to several factors including but not limited to excessive ingestion of pseudoephedrine (nasal/sinus decongestant) in combination with caffeine".

=== Inquest ===
In November 2013, Calder wrote to Kilonzo's son Mutula Jr. claiming that samples sent for toxicological testing at the Imperial College in London, England were contaminated. The samples had been dispatched and delivered in May 2013, with a man known as "Menendez" responding as "received in good condition". Mutula Jr. then wrote to Kilonzo's former physician Luke Musau, describing the claim as "alarming and criminal". Calder later stated in a report that in the absence of laboratory data, he sought the opinion of fellow experts from within and outside the United Kingdom, adding that he felt that "on present information this is as far as it is possible to proceed".

In October 2014, an inquest was launched after Kilonzo's children Wanza, Mutula Jr., Kethi and Musembi lodged a complaint with the Director of Public Prosecutions (DPP) and the Directorate of Criminal Investigations (DCI) regarding the tampering of their father's toxicology samples. At a hearing in September 2017, Mutula Jr. claimed that his father's death was "a well organised elimination in collaboration with workers or persons close to him which was followed up by a massive cover up". He dismissed the government report released three months earlier and added that the state "had failed to seek and get explanations as to why the samples were withheld in Nairobi for nine days and in whose custody they were".

In June 2018, a new autopsy report ruled out Kilonzo's possible use of "sex-enhancing drugs" prior to his death, with Mwangi stating that "no tablets were identified with features suggestive of viagra, other types of sildenafil or cialis equivalents". In 2020, the inquest concluded that Kilonzo's death had not been due to foul play.
