= Richard Makenga =

Kenyan politician (born 1960)

Richard Katemi Makenga (born 12 September 1960) is a Kenyan businessman and politician, who is currently the Member of National Assembly for Kaiti Constituency in Makueni County, Kenya.

He was elected Member of National Assembly in March 2013 after many unsuccessful attempts to clinch the seat, taking over from Gideon Ndambuki who had quit the parliamentary race to run for Makueni Senator seat in the same general election but lost the Wiper Democratic Movement ticket to the late Mutula Kilonzo who would eventually be elected senator. Mutula died slightly over a month after the general elections.

Makenga has been running private businesses, mostly in the Clearing and Forwarding industry since 1990.
