= Kilonzo =

Kilonzo is a surname. Notable people with the surname include:

- Charles Kilonzo, Kenyan politician
- Cleopa Kilonzo Mailu (born c. 1956), Kenyan politician
- Kakai Kilonzo (born 1954), Kenyan musician
- Kethi Kilonzo (born 1977), Kenyan lawyer
- Kiema Kilonzo, Kenyan politician
- Mutula Kilonzo (1948-2013), Kenyan politician
- Nduku Kilonzo (born 1974), Kenyan businesswoman
- Stella Kilonzo (born 1975), Kenyan businesswoman
