= Mbooni Constituency =

Kenyan electoral constituency

Mbooni Constituency is an electoral constituency in Kenya. It is one of six constituencies in Makueni County which was established for the 1966 elections. The elected representative for the National Assembly is a member of New Democrats Party. The current Member of National Assembly is Honorable Nzioka Erastus Kivasu.

== Members of Parliament ==
| Elections | MP | Party | Notes |
|---|---|---|---|
| 1966 | Simon Musau Kioko | KANU | |
| 1969 | Simon Musau Kioko | KANU | One-party system |
| 1974 | Fredrick Mulinge Kalulu | KANU | One-party system |
| 1979 | Fredrick Mulinge Kalulu | KANU | One-party system |
| 1983 | Joseph Konzollo Munyao | KANU | One-party system. |
| 1988 | Johnstone Mwendo Makau | KANU | One-party system. |
| 1992 | Johnstone Mwendo Makau | KANU | |
| 1997 | Fredrick Mulinge Kalulu | KANU | |
| 2002 | Joseph Konzollo Munyao | NARC | |
| 2007 | Mutula Kilonzo | ODM-Kenya | |
| 2013 | Michael Kisoi | WDM-K | |
| 2017 | Erustus Kivasu | New Democrats | |

== Locations and wards ==
Locations
| Location | Population* |
| Athi | 6,184 |
| Kako | 7,636 |
| Kalawa | 9,974 |
| Katangini | 8,668 |
| Kathulumbi | 7,209 |
| Kisau | 18,766 |
| Kiteta | 23,253 |
| Kithungo | 15,467 |
| Kitundu | 15,089 |
| Mbooni | 37,549 |
| Tulimani | 39,789 |
| Waia | 19,428 |
| Total | x |

Wards
| Ward | Registered Voters | Local Authority |
| Kako | 2,144 | Wote town |
| Kalawa | 4,970 | Makueni county |
| Katangini | 4,764 | Makueni county |
| Kisau | 11,445 | Makueni county |
| Kiteta | 7,470 | Makueni county |
| Kithungo / Kitundu | 9,092 | Makueni county |
| Mbooni | 11,219 | Makueni county |
| Tulimani | 13,329 | Makueni county |
| Total | 64,433 | |
*September 2005.
