= Teresia Mbaika Malokwe =

Kenyan environmentalist

- Born: 1986 (age 39–40) Kaiti area, in currently Makueni County; Kenya
- Citizenship: Kenya
- Education: Kenyatta University (Bachelor of Science in Environmental Health); University of Nairobi (Master of Science in Health Economics); Texas A&M University (Comprehensive Introduction to Nuclear Power)
- Occupations: Environmentalist, Health Economist
- Years active: 2013 — present
- Known for: Leadership, professional expertise

Teresia Mbaika Malokwe (née Teresia Mbaika), is currently the nominated principal secretary of State Department for aviation & aerospace development under ministry of roads and transport. Teresia is also an environmentalist and health economist. She also serves as the Secretary of the "National Government-Constituency Development Fund" (NG-CDF) for Kaiti Constituency, in Makueni County, in the former Eastern Province of Kenya.

== Early life and education ==
She was born in the present-day Kaiti Constituency, Makueni County, approximately 117 kilometres (73 mi), by road, south-east of Nairobi, the capital and largest city of Kenya.

She attended a local primary school and precious blood kilungu( in kaiti constituency, makueni county) where she attained a clean A in all subjects. After high school, she was admitted to Kenyatta University, a public university, whose main campus is in Nairobi County, where she graduated with a Bachelor of Science degree in Environmental Health, in 2011. She followed that with a Master of Science degree in Health Economics, obtained from the University of Nairobi, in 2014. Later in 2016, she received training leading to the award of a certificate in "Comprehensive Introduction to Nuclear Power", at Texas A&M University, in College Station, Texas, United States.

== Career ==
She has worked at the Kaiti Constituency NG-CDF since June 2013. Her duties there, include overseeing financial management, corporate governance and compliance at the government agency.

== Other considerations ==
Ms Teresia Mbaika Malokwe is a member of the eleven-person board of directors at the Kenya Nuclear Electricity Board. While there, she chairs the Finance and General Purpose committee.

Since January 2014, she serves as a board member at Beams Construction & Supplies Limited, a Nairobi-based construction company.

In June 2018, the president of Kenya, Uhuru Kenyatta appointed Teresia Mbaika Malokwe to the board of directors at the National Environment Management Authority of Kenya, for a three-year renewable term.

Ms Teresia Mbaika Malokwe (Terry), serves as the Deputy Director for Youth and Gender Affairs at Ukamba Network Vamwe (UNV), a community development non-profit that aims to unite Ukambani communities, in an attempt to improve their standard of living.
