= Mutula Kilonzo Jnr =

Hon. Mutula Kilonzo Jnr.

Governor of Makueni County
- Incumbent
- Assumed office 25 September 2022
- Preceded by: Kivutha Kibwana

Senator of Makueni County
- In office 1 August 2013 – 25 August 2022
- Preceded by: Mutula Kilonzo
- Succeeded by: Daniel Maanzo

Personal details
- Born: Mutula Kilonzo Junior; 23 October 1975 (age 50) Nairobi, Kenya
- Spouse: Anita Mutula
- Parent: Mutula Kilonzo (father)
- Relatives: Kethi Kilonzo (sister)
- Occupation: Politician
- Profession: Lawyer

Junior Mutula Kilonzo (born 23 October 1975) is a Kenyan politician and lawyer and the current Governor of Makueni County. He is a member and chair of the Wiper Democratic Movement, and was elected as the second Senator of Makueni County in a by-election in July 2013, after the demise of his father Mutula Kilonzo. Serving as the second Governor for Makueni County since August 2022, he is married to Anita Mutula and they have two children.

== Early life and education ==
Mutula Kilonzo Jnr was born in Nairobi in 1975. He was born to Mutula Kilonzo and his first wife. He is a brother to Kethi Kilonzo and Wanza Kilonzo. Since his father remarried, he has stepbrothers. For his secondary school education, he studied at Milimani Secondary in Nairobi. He earned his Bachelor of Laws (LLB) degree from Dr. Ambedkar College, Nagpur.

== Controversies surrounding his father's death ==
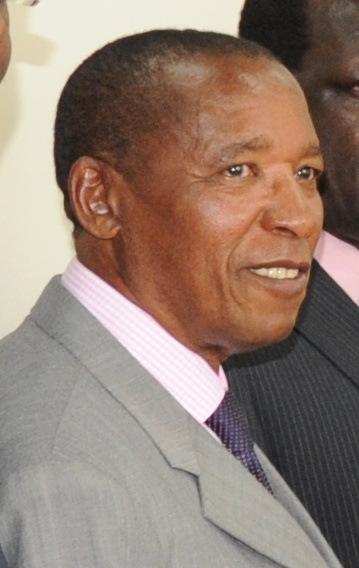
Late Mutula Kilonzo Senior, Father to Mutula Kilonzo Jnr

In 2013, Kilonzo at the Machakos High court, testified in an inquest into his father's death and indicated there was suspicion on lack of reports about the people close to his father and workers he had made contact within the last days before his death. He claimed that a cover-up had been hatched after a postmortem was conducted at the Lee Funeral Home, in a bid to protect the perpetrators. The police, however, ruled out foul play saying that the autopsy conducted revealed that Mutula Kilonzo died of natural causes and had excessive internal bleeding due to the high blood pressure he was suffering as indicated by the internal organs. The police further indicated that they had interviewed all the persons at Mutula's Maanzoni Residence, where he met his death. This was followed by a tough tussle in court between Nduku Kilonzo, Mutula's second wife, and the children about the execution of the late lawyer's will. The will according to Mutula Kilonzo, Nduku Kilonzo and Kilonzo Musembi, his father were the only sole executors of the will, against Nduku's proposal of single-handedly executing herself that the children were against. They finally resorted to solving the dispute out of the courts.

== Career ==
Kilonzo is a lawyer and a certified public secretary. He serves as an advocate of the High Court of Kenya and Supreme Court He is also an associate of the Chartered Institute of Arbitrators, Kenya. He began his career as an apprentice in his father's firm, Kilonzo and Company Advocates, in 1995. He became an associate at the firm in 2001.

== Political career ==
Kilonzo first came to the political limelight in July 2013, after his father died while in office and serving as the then-Senator of Makueni County. He was selected as the Wiper Party flag bearer after his sister, lawyer Kethi Kilonzo, who was the initial and first choice to take after their father, was barred by the Independent Electoral and Boundaries Commission from contesting the elections on the grounds that she was not a registered voter, affirmed by a three-judge bench of the High Court of Kenya. He contested in the by-elections that were held thereafter using the Wiper Democratic Movement, Kenya ticket which he won with 163,232 votes, beating Philip Kaloki of the NARK Party, who was second with 9,762 votes, John Harun Mwau of PICK party came third with 6,431 votes, Urbanus Muthoka, who was an independent candidate garnered 517 votes and Jane Kitundu of Labour Party was last with 387 votes. Here is a breakdown of the results from the by-election:

Candidate	Party	Vote
Mutula Kilonzo Jnr	Wiper Democratic Movement(WDM)	163, 232
Philip Kaloki	NARK	9, 762
John Harun Mwau	PICK	6, 431
Urbanus Muthoka	Independent	517
Jane Kitundu	Labour Party	387

He became an active member of the Coalition For Reforms and Democracy, which the Wiper Democratic Movement Kenya was affiliated to. Kilonzo ran for the second term in August 2017. He won the seat and served until August 2022 where He was elected as Governor Makueni County.

Throughout his term as Senator, Kilonzo has emerged as a critic of corruption in various arms of the Kenya Government.

== Recognition ==
He has been recognized for his services:.

- As a member of the Young Lawyers Committee of the Law Society of Kenya.
- As a member of the Committee on Justice, Legal Affairs and Human Rights.
