= Joseph K. Munyao =

Kenyan politician (1940–2025)

Joseph Konzolo Munyao

Minister for Livestock and Fisheries Development
- In office 2003–2007
- President: Mwai Kibaki

Member of Parliament for Mbooni Constituency
- In office 2003–2007

Member of Parliament for Mbooni Constituency
- In office 1983–1988

Member of Parliament for Mbooni Constituency
- In office 1975–1979

Personal details
- Born: 4 May 1940 Makueni District, Colony and Protectorate of Kenya
- Died: 22 November 2025 (aged 85)
- Party: Democratic Party (Kenya)
- Other political affiliations: Kenya African National Union (–1991), National Rainbow Coalition (2002–2007)

Joseph Konzolo Munyao (4 May 1940 – 22 November 2025) was a Kenyan politician and Cabinet minister. He represented Mbooni Constituency in the National Assembly in three non-consecutive terms and served as Minister for Livestock and Fisheries Development in President Mwai Kibaki’s administration from 2003 to 2007.

== Early life and education ==
Munyao was born in Makueni County and educated at Kibauni Primary, Makueni Intermediate, and Machakos School between 1958 and 1961. He worked as a bank clerk at Standard Bank (later Standard Chartered) before joining the provincial administration as an accountant in the Office of the President. Between 1969 and 1972, he served as a financial attaché at the Kenyan embassy in Moscow.

== Political career ==
Munyao entered politics in the 1963 general election but first won election in 1975 following a successful by-election petition in Mbooni Constituency. He lost his seat in 1979 and regained it in 1983 under the ruling Kenya African National Union party, serving until 1988. In 1991, he co-founded the Democratic Party (Kenya) with Mwai Kibaki.

In 2002, he was re-elected as MP under the National Rainbow Coalition (NARC) platform and appointed Minister for Livestock and Fisheries Development in President Kibaki’s government. He lost the Mbooni seat in the 2007 general election to Mutula Kilonzo.

== Party leadership ==
Munyao served for many years as the national chairman of the Democratic Party. In February 2022, he stepped down in favour of Justin Muturi, who was elected party leader.

== Business and farming ==
Munyao was a businessman and farmer. From 1973, he managed Plastic Products (K) Ltd and operated a commercial farm in Kalawa, Makueni, where he practised mixed agriculture including dairy, poultry, citrus and cotton.

== Death ==
Munyao died on 22 November 2025, at the age of 85.

== Legacy ==
Munyao's career spanned both the single-party and multi-party eras in Kenyan politics. He is remembered for contributions to livestock policy and infrastructure development in rural areas during his ministerial tenure.
