= Mtito Andei Airport =

- IATA: n/a; ICAO: HKMT

Summary
- Airport type: Public, Civilian
- Owner: Kenya Airports Authority
- Serves: Mtito Andei, Kenya
- Location: Mtito Andei, Kenya
- Elevation AMSL: 2,398 ft / 731 m
- Coordinates: 02°42′00″S 38°10′27″E

Map
- Location of Mtito Andei Airport in Kenya; Placement on map is approximate

Runways
Direction	Length		Surface
Direction	ft	m	Surface
12/30	4,600	1,400	Unpaved

Mtito Andei Airport is an airport in Kenya.

== Location ==
The airport, (IATA: n/a, ICAO: HKMT) is located in Makueni County, in the town of Mtito Andei, in southeastern Kenya. The airport lies at the edge of Tsavo East National Park.

Its location is approximately 221 kilometres (137 mi), by air, southeast of Nairobi International Airport, the country's largest civilian airport. The geographic coordinates of this airport are:2° 42' 0.00"S, 38° 10' 27.00"E (Latitude:-2.700000; Longitude:38.174166).

== Overview ==
Mtito Andei Airport is a small airport that serves the town of Mtito Andei and the adjacent Tsavo National Park. Situated 731 metres (2,398 ft) above sea level, the airport has a single unpaved runway that measures 1,400 metres (4,600 ft) in length.

== Airlines and destinations ==
At the moment there are no regular, scheduled airline services to Mtito Airport.

== See also ==
- Eastern Province (Kenya)
- Kenya Civil Aviation Authority
- List of airports in Kenya
