= Subdivisions of Kenya =

Administrative divisions

Number of districts in Kenya
Province	Number of districts	Population	Population/district
Coast	26	4,328,474	166,480
North-Eastern	17	2,490,073	146,475
Eastern	43	6,821,049	158,629
Central	34	5,482,239	161,242
Rift Valley	78	12,752,966	163,500
Western	33	5,021,943	152,180
Nyanza	42	6,269,489	149,274
Nairobi	18	4,397,073	244,282

The subdivisions of Kenya have been in place since 2010, replacing the old system. Under the Constitution of 2010 and other reforms to Provincial Administration the country acquired a new system of Counties. The previous Provinces were scrapped and the 46 Districts, in existence since 1992, were turned into Counties with elected governments.

The counties are divided into sub-counties and a further 290 constituencies, then 1450 Wards (to coincide with the County Assembly Wards of the County Government), and Villages. The City of Nairobi, which enjoyed the status of a full administrative province, would become a County.

Under its old constitution, Kenya comprised eight provinces each headed by a Provincial Commissioner (centrally appointed by the president). The provinces (mkoa singular mikoa plural in Swahili) were subdivided into districts (wilaya). There were 69 districts at the 1999 census. Districts were then subdivided into 497 divisions (taarafa). The divisions are then subdivided into 2,427 locations (mtaa) and then 6,612 sublocations (mtaa mdogo).

== Provinces ==
Provinces of Kenya

1. Central
2. Coast
3. Eastern
4. Nairobi
5. North Eastern
6. Nyanza
7. Rift Valley
8. Western

Local governance in Kenya is practiced through local authorities. Many urban centers host city, municipal or town councils. Local authorities in rural areas were known as county councils. Local Councillors were formerly elected by civic elections, held alongside general elections. Constituencies are an electoral subdivision. There are 290 Constituencies in Kenya.
