= Ndolo =

Ndolo may refer to:

People

- Alexandra Ndolo (born 1986), German-born Kenyan fencer
- Joseph Musyimi Lele Ndolo, Kenyan military commander
- Wilson Ndolo Ayah (1932–2016), Kenyan politician

Other

- Ndolo language
- Ndolo Airport
