= Kaiti Constituency =

Kenyan electoral constituency

Kaiti Constituency is an electoral constituency in Kenya. It is one of six constituencies in Makueni County. The constituency was established for the 1997 elections.

== Members of Parliament ==
Elections	MP	Party	Notes
1997	Gideon Musyoka Ndambuki	KANU	
2002	Gideon Musyoka Ndambuki	KANU	
2007	Gideon Musyoka Ndambuki	ODM-Kenya	
2013	Richard Katemi Makenga	Wiper Party	
2017	Joshua Kimilu	Wiper Party	

== Locations and wards ==
Locations
Location	Population*
Ilima	22,311
Kee	14,760
Kikoko	21,805
Kilala	18,846
Kilungu	8,955
Okia	22,484
Kithembe	18,292
Watema	11,046
Total	x

Wards
Ward	Registered Voters	Local Authority
Kaumoni	4,395	Wote town
Kilungu / Ilima	9,117	Makueni county
Kithembe / Kikoko	13,209	Makueni county
Ukia / Iuani	10,030	Makueni county
Watema / Kee / Kivani	8,507	Makueni county
Total	45,258	
*September 2005.
