= HKMU =

HKMU may refer to:

- Hong Kong Metropolitan University, statutory university in Ho Man Tin, Hong Kong
- Hubert Kairuki Memorial University, private medical university in Dar es Salaam, Tanzania
- Makindu Airport (ICAO airport code), airport in Makindu, Kenya
