= Philip Kaloki =

Professor Philip Kaloki PHD, EBS, MBS is a Kenyan politician and an expert in Governance, Leadership & Strategic Management. He was elected to represent the Kibwezi Constituency in the National Assembly of Kenya in 2007 Kenyan parliamentary election. He contested the Kenya 2022 general elections as a running mate of Polycarp Igathe in a race for gorvernor seat in Nairobi county.

== Early life and education ==
Hon. Philip Kaloki was born on 10 December 1960 in Kibwezi East, Makueni County of Kenya. He attended Molemuni Primary School and Mutonguni Secondary School for his O-level education and later joined Kilungu Day High School for his A-level education. He then attended the University of Mary Hardin–Baylor where he attained his degree in Finance and Economics and later his MBA at University of Dallas. He then joined the University of Nairobi for His Ph.D. in Business Administration.

== Political career ==
Hon. Prof. Philip K. Kaloki was elected as a member of parliament for Kibwezi Constituency in 2007 where he served in different parliamentary committees and was a Member of the House Speaker's panel; he served as the Vice Chairman in the coveted Finance, Planning, Trade and Tourism Committee of the Kenya National Assembly. Prof. Kaloki also sat in the Parliamentary Committee of Energy & Communication and the Committee of Procedure and House Rules besides sitting in the Committee on Implementation of the new Constitution. He also served as the ODM-Kenya Party Whip. Prof. Kaloki vied for the Makueni Governor seat in the 2013 general elections and MP for Kibwezi East in the 2017 elections. In April 2022, he was nominated to deputize Polycarp Igathe of Jubilee party in the August 2022 general elections for the Nairobi gubernatorial position.

== Professional career ==
In 2013. Prof Kaloki was appointed by H.E President Uhuru Kenyatta as the Kenya Medical Training College Board chair. Upon completion of his term as chair in April 2021, the institution recorded exponential growth with 43 new KMTC colleges established across the country and a student population growth from 19,000 to over 51,000.

Prof. Kaloki, EBS has been a distinguished Trade/Business Consultant. He has worked as the team leader of technical experts helping Central Rift and Upper Eastern County Governments on COVID-19 and Health Systems Strengthening. He is the CEO of Global Centre for Business Development and has worked as lead consultant in various Ministry of Trade/ Export Promotion Council (EPC), Kenya projects such as Market Research and Feasibility study in the Democratic Republic of Congo, February and October 2012; Review Export Promotion Council (EPC) Trade Development Program (TDP), Sept 2010 to Jan 2011; “Market Study and Developing a Market Penetration Strategy for South East Region of the US and Organizing a Kenya Trade Mission to Texas, 16 October 2005. He is also the Kenya Patron of the Turner Foundation based in Canada where he helped mobilize resources for water provision in major towns in Kibwezi and improvement of learning institutions. He enjoined as a Full Time Instructor of Business at the Dallas Baptist University (DBU) in 1990. In 1989, he was a member of the Adjunct Faculty at the DBU, Texas, USA. Prof. Kaloki became assistant professor of business in 1993 to 2001 when he became associate professor of Business and later a professor of Business since 2005 at Dallas Baptist University.

== Awards and honors ==
Hon Prof. Philip K. Kaloki holds various recognition awards and honors. In 2019 he was awarded the national award of the Elder of the Burning Spear (EBS) by H.E President Uhuru Kenyatta. He had previously received the award or the Moran of the Order of the Burning Spear (MBS) in 2016 from H.E. Hon. Uhuru Kenyatta for his distinguished service to the nation.

In 2002, he was awarded for his 15 years' service to Dallas Baptist University. In 1998, he was given the Outstanding Business Professor Award of the Dallas Baptist University and in 1996, he was among Who's Who Among American Teachers of the U.S.A. Educational Committee, Lake Forest, Illinois, an award he previously held in 1994. In 1987, the MP was awarded with the University of Mary Hardin Baylor Student Foundation Award, Belton, Texas, and in 1985, Prof. Kaloki was awarded with Honour Roll, University of Mary Hardin Baylor, Belton, Texas, while in 1984–1986 he got the Presidential Scholarship Award, University of Mary Hardin Baylor, Belton, Texas.

Prof. Kaloki has been Chairman of the East African Association, Dallas/Ft Chapter – 2000–2007. He has also been the Chairman of Education Committee-Dallas/Ft worth International and has been DBU Graduate Association Committee Member since 1989. He also sat in the MBA Advisory Board Committee of the Dallas Baptist University, 1987–1988.
