= Makindu Airport =

- IATA: n/a; ICAO: HKMU

Summary
- Airport type: Public, Civilian
- Owner: Kenya Airports Authority
- Serves: Makindu, Kenya
- Location: Makindu, Kenya
- Elevation AMSL: 3,300 ft / 1,000 m
- Coordinates: 02°17′33″S 37°49′36″E

Map
- Location of Makindu Airport in Kenya; Placement on map is approximate

Runways
Direction	Length		Surface
Direction	ft	m	Surface
14/32	3,000	910	Unpaved

Makindu Airport is an airport in Makindu, Kenya.

== Location ==
Makindu Airport (IATA: n/a, ICAO: HKMU) is located in Makueni County, in the town of Makindu, in southeastern Kenya, on the Nairobi-Mombasa Highway.

Its location is approximately 146 kilometres (91 mi), by air, southeast of Nairobi International Airport, the country's largest civilian airport. The geographic coordinates of this airport are:2° 17' 33.00"S, +37° 49' 36.00"E (Latitude:-2.292500; Longitude:37.826667).

== Overview ==
Makindu Airport is a small airport that serves the town of Makindu and the adjacent communities. Situated 1,000 metres (3,300 ft) above sea level, the airport has a single unpaved runway that measures 3,000 feet (910 m) in length.

== Airlines and destinations ==
At the moment there are no regular, scheduled airline services to Makindu Airport.

== See also ==
- Makindu
- Makueni County
- Eastern Province (Kenya)
- Kenya Airports Authority
- Kenya Civil Aviation Authority
- List of airports in Kenya
