= Muungano Party =

Political party in Kenya

The Muungano Party (MP) is a political party in Kenya.

== History ==
The Muungano Party was established in 2007, and nominated a single National Assembly candidate for the 2007 general elections, Tito Mutunga Muunda in Makueni. He received 517 votes, finishing twelfth in a field of nineteen candidates.

In the 2013 elections the party nominated 16 candidates for the National Assembly. It received 0.9% of the vote, winning a single seat, Francis Mwangangi Kilonzo in Yatta. It also won the gubernatorial election in Makueni County, with former MP Kivutha Kibwana elected as the county's Governor. Kibwana left to join Wiper in February 2017.

The party nominated twelve National Assembly candidates for the 2017 general elections, although Kilonzo had left the party and ran as a Chama Cha Uzalendo candidate. The party lost the Yatta seat, but Fabian Muli was elected in Kangundo to retain the party's representation in parliament.
