= Imale =

- Location within Kenya
- Coordinates: 2.15°S 38.28°E
- Country: Kenya
- Province: Eastern Province
- Time zone: UTC+3 (EAT)

Imale is a settlement in Kenya, located in Kitui County in the Eastern Province.

The Commission on Revenue Allocation has identified it as a marginalised area in their Second Policy Focus, as it lies within the bottom 20% for deprivation of the 7,131 country-wide lowest-level administrative units.

== History ==
The village had a population of 662 in the 1962 Census.

== Schools ==
There is an Imale School located in Makueni County, which educates 400 students and 150 boarding school students. There is another Imale school in Machakos County.

Imale Primary School is located in Voo in Kyangwithya West.
