= Munyao =

Munyao is a surname. Notable people with the surname include:

- Alexander Mutiso Munyao (born 1996), Kenyan long-distance runner
- Danny Munyao (born 1987), Zambian football player
- Joseph K. Munyao (1940–2025), Kenyan politician
