= Kilome Constituency =

Kenyan electoral constituency

Kilome Constituency is an electoral constituency in Kenya. It is one of six constituencies in Makueni County. The constituency was established for the 1988 elections. The constituency has three wards, all electing councillors for the Makueni County Council. The town of Sultan Hamud is located within Kilome Constituency.

== Members of Parliament ==
Elections	MP	Party	Notes
1988	Gervais Mutunga Maingi	KANU	One-party system.
1992	Anthony Wambua Ndilinge	KANU	
1997	Anthony Wambua Ndilinge	KANU	Ndilinge was assassinated in 2001
2001	John Mutinda Mutiso	KANU	By-elections
2002	John Mutinda Mutiso	NARC	
2007	John Harun Mwau	PICK	
2013	Regina Nthambi Muia	WIPER	
2017	Thuddeus Kithua Nzambia	WIPER	
2022	Thuddeus Kithua Nzambia	WIPER	

== Wards ==
Wards
Ward	Registered Voters
Kalanzoni / Kiima Kiu	21,259
Kasikeu	23,435
Mukaa / Kitaingo	14,485
Total	99,158
*September 2005.
