= Jackson Kasanga Mulwa =

Kenyan judge and politician

Jackson Kasanga Mulwa (1942 – 16 March 2015) was a Kenyan judge and politician.

Mulwa was a judge on the East African Court of Justice, as well as a Member of Parliament representing Makueni Constituency from 1969 to 1983.
