= Ngusishi =

Coordinates: 0.06947°N 37.29904°E

Ngusishi is a locality in Buuri West sub-county, Meru County, Kenya, within the historical Eastern Province.

The region is agricultural and is subject to water insufficiency. Ngusishi Water Resources Users Association was established to organise the best use of water resources, became a registered community-based organisation in 2003, and As of July 2003 manages 20 water projects that serve 10,000 people.

In 2020, the national government commissioned construction of a cold storage facility at Ngusishi for potatoes, an important crop in Meru County. The facility had its official opening in January 2024.

In the colonial era when Kenya was part of the British Empire, Farm 922, Ngusishi Farm, was assigned by lottery in 1918 to Wyndham Carles, who became a local Justice of the Peace.
