= Joseph Musyimi Lele Ndolo =

Kenyan former military commander

- Born: 1919; Mbitine, East Africa Protectorate (in modern-day Makueni County, Kenya)
- Died: 6 April 1984 (aged 64–65); Sultan Hamud, Kenya
- Cause of death: Car accident
- Spouse(s): Alice Katiwa; Rose Mutinda; Elizabeth Kamene
- Military career
- Allegiance: Kenya
- Branch: King's African Rifles; Kenya Army
- Service years: 1940-1971
- Rank: Major General
- Unit: 6th King’s African Rifles
- Commands: 5th Battalion Kenya Rifles; Kenya Army
- Known for: First African Chief of the General Staff
- Conflicts: World War II; Shifta War
- Awards: Member of the Order of the British Empire (MBE); Order of the Star of Africa (Commander); Order of the Burning Spear (OBS)

Joseph Musyimi Lele Ndolo (born 1919 – 6 April 1984) was a Kenyan military officer who served in the Kenya Army, reaching the rank of Major General. He was the first African to head the Kenya Army and Chief of the General Staff (the head of all armed forces in Kenya).

== Early life and education ==
Joseph Musyimi Lele Ndolo was born circa 1919. Ndolo hailed from the Mbitine, East Africa Protectorate, which is in modern-day Makueni region in eastern Kenya. Specific details about his parents or immediate family during childhood remain undocumented in available records. In his late teens, Ndolo walked from Makueni to Moshi, Tanganyika, in search of opportunities. In 1940 he enlisted in the King's African Rifles (KAR - a British colonial regiment in East Africa) as a private while employed on a plantation in Moshi.

Ndolo had three wives namely: Alice Katiwa, Rose Mutinda and Elizabeth Kamene.

== Military career ==
Joseph Ndolo enlisted in the King's African Rifles (KAR) during the Second World War. The KAR was a British colonial regiment composed primarily of African askari (soldiers) drawn from across East Africa. During the war, Ndolo served in overseas operations, including the Burma campaign, and advanced steadily through the non-commissioned ranks.

By the end of the war, he had attained the rank of regimental sergeant major, which at the time, which at the time was generally the highest position attainable by African non‑commissioned soldiers in the colonial military.

Following the war, Ndolo continued his service in the KAR during a period of gradual reform within the British colonial forces. He was promoted to the position of effendi, a warrant officer grade that served as an intermediary rank between enlisted African soldiers and commissioned British officers. This role granted limited command responsibilities and reflected the cautious expansion of leadership opportunities for Africans within the colonial system.

In the late 1950s and early 1960s, as independence movements gained momentum across East Africa, British authorities introduced policies aimed at Africanisation of the officer corps. Under these reforms, Ndolo was selected for commissioning and became one of the first Africans to be appointed as a commissioned officer in the KAR. In early 1963, shortly before Kenya attained independence, he received a commission as a second lieutenant and was promoted later that year to lieutenant colonel.

Following this promotion, Ndolo was appointed Commanding Officer of the 5th Battalion, Kenya Rifles, becoming the first African to command a battalion within the transitioning force. He played a central role in overseeing the unit’s integration from a colonial regiment into the newly established Kenya Army after independence in December 1963.

Between 1963 and 1967, Ndolo held senior operational responsibilities during the Shifta War, a secessionist conflict in northern Kenya involving Somali insurgent groups. During this period, he was involved in planning and directing counter‑insurgency operations as part of the Kenya Army’s early internal security efforts.

In 1966, Ndolo was promoted to the rank of Brigadier and assumed command of the Kenya Army. Three years later, in 1969, he was promoted to Major General and appointed Chief of the Defence Staff, making him the first African to hold the position. As Chief of the Defence Staff, he oversaw the continued localisation of senior command positions and the consolidation of the Kenya Army as a national defence force in the post‑independence period.

== Controversy ==
In the late 1960s, Kenya experienced heightened political tensions following the assassination of cabinet minister Tom Mboya in 1969, alongside growing ethnic divisions and unrest within the country. During this period, concerns emerged within government circles about the potential politicisation of the military. Ndolo, then serving as Chief of the General Staff, was reported to have expressed criticism of the government’s handling of internal security challenges and ethnic tensions, particularly regarding discipline within the armed forces.

According to contemporary intelligence and government sources, Ndolo was disturbed by reports that ammunition had been unlawfully removed from military stores and passed to civilians, as well as by the resurgence of clandestine oath‑taking practices among sections of the Kikuyu community. Such activities were perceived by senior military and security officials as undermining cohesion and neutrality within the armed forces during a politically sensitive period.

In early 1971, Kenyan authorities uncovered an alleged conspiracy to overthrow the presidency of Jomo Kenyatta. Investigations by security and intelligence services claimed that planning discussions had taken place in several locations, including parts of eastern Kenya, Kampala, and Dar es Salaam, with the intended date of the coup reported as 8 April 1971. During subsequent trials, some convicted participants, including Yatta Member of Parliament Gideon Mutiso, implicated Ndolo in the alleged plot.

As a result of these allegations, Ndolo was compelled to resign from his position as Chief of the General Staff in 1971, shortly after the conclusion of the trials. He was not formally charged, nor was he tried or convicted in connection with the alleged coup. Official sources at the time did not publicly provide detailed evidence linking him directly to the conspiracy, and his removal from office was widely interpreted as a precautionary measure taken by the government amid heightened concerns over loyalty within the military.

== Notable campaigns and operations ==
- World War II, [1940-1945]: [King’s African Rifles – Burma campaign.]
- Shifta War, Northern Frontier Kenya [1963-1967]: [Commander of 5th Battalion Kenya Rifles.]

== Awards and decorations ==
- Member of the Order of the British Empire (MBE) - (1961)
- Order of the Star of Africa (Commander) - (1970)
- Order of the Burning Spear (OBS) - (1967)

== Later life ==
Following his resignation, Ndolo retired to his Mwani farm in Sultan Hamud, Kenya, and maintained a low profile until his death on 6 April 1984 in a road accident.

He was survived by three wives and 17 children.

== Legacy ==
Military scholars have argued that Ndolo played a pivotal role in the Africanization of the Kenyan military. Under his command, the military prioritized training and promoting Kenyan personnel, reducing reliance on foreign advisors and fostering unit cohesion in the newly formed Kenya Army. His contributions laid foundational precedents for indigenous military autonomy, influencing subsequent leaders and ensuring the Kenya Army's evolution into a capable national institution capable of internal security and regional operations. Despite his dismissal in 1969 amid allegations of disloyalty, Ndolo's pioneering command accelerated the replacement of over 90% of senior British officers by the early 1970s, a process credited with stabilizing the force's loyalty to the Kenyan government.
