= Gideon Ndambuki =

Kenyan politician (born 1947)

Gideon Musyoka Ndambuki (born 1947) is a Kenyan politician. He served as the Kaiti Constituency MP from 1997 when the constituency was established to 2013. He was also a minister between 1998 and 2002. At the 1997 and 2002 elections he won the seat on a KANU party ticket, but switched to the Orange Democratic Movement-Kenya at the 2007 Kenyan parliamentary election. He unsuccessfully vied for the Makueni County Senate seat during Wiper Democratic Party nominations in the run-up to the 2013 General Elections in Kenya. Educated in the US, he was an employee of the Commercial Bank of Africa in the 1980s, and more controversially, Managing Director of Trade Bank between 1986 and its collapse in 1993.

== Early life and education ==
Ndambuki was born in Kaiti, in a remote part of Makueni District in Kenya's Eastern Province. Between 1958 and 1965 he studied at Ukia Primary School to attain basic education. Then he went to Kangundo High School in Machakos for the ordinary level from where he graduated in the advanced level in 1969.Gideon Ndambuki graduated with a Bachelor of Small Business Management from the Emporia State University in 1978. He continued further studies at Emporia State University United States of America where he earned an MBA.

== Politics ==
Ndambuki vied for the Kaiti Constituency parliamentary seat in 1997, and won. At the time, Kenya had already become a multi-party state with Kenya African National Union (KANU) as the ruling party, which also recaptured power with majority of votes in that General Election. After the 1997 general election, Ndambuki was appointed Minister of State in the Office of the President in charge of: Development, Drought Management Programme, Directorate of Personnel Management (DPM) by retired president the late Daniel Arap Moi. He was transferred to the Ministry for Lands in 1999, serving until 2000. He served in Speaker panel of the National assembly in 2000.

=== 1998–1999 Kenyan Parliament ===
Kenya's second multiparty elections were held in 1997. Ndambuki stayed in KANU, and was appointed Assistant Minister in charge of: Development, Drought Management Programme, Directorate of Personnel Management (DPM).

=== 1999–2000 Kenyan Parliament ===
Ndambuki was again appointed as the Assistant Minister of Lands and Physical Planning while serving as M.P of Kaiti.

=== 2001–2002 Kenyan Parliament ===
Ndambuki was shifted to the Minister of Higher Education Science and Technology under the then President Daniel Toroitich arap Moi. He was in charge of Technical and Vocational training Institutions in charge of implementing the Government Policies on tertiary institutions.

=== 2000 Kenyan Parliament ===
Ndambuki was assisted to the Member of the Speaker’s Panel.

=== 2002 Elections ===
In the months leading up to the 2002 general election, under the leadership of then KANU secretary general, Raila Odinga, he decamped from KANU to join the National Rainbow Coalition, which went on to win the general elections. Ndambuki was elected as the M.P for Kaiti Constituency for the second time.

=== 2003–2007 Kenyan Parliament ===
Ndambuki was the selected to be a member of Kenya National Assembly Administration of Justice and Legal Affairs Committee.

=== After 2007 ===
Amid a violent crisis over the results, with supporters of Mwai Kibaki and Raila Odinga disputing the outcome, Mwai Kibaki appointed Ndambuki as Assistant Minister in the Ministry of Agriculture.The political crisis eventually led to the signing of a power-sharing agreement between Mwai Kibaki and Raila Odinga. In the Grand Coalition Cabinet that was announced on 13 April 2008, Ndambuki remained Assistant Minister in the Ministry of Agriculture.

=== 2008–2013 Kenyan Parliament ===
Ndambuki as Assistant Minister in the Ministry of Agriculture. He was responsible for • Maintaining food security through the provision of Extension and Research Services both Livestock and Crops • Quick Economic Recovery through the implementation of the Demand Driven Approach Programme (DDA) and other commodity projects • Assisting in Poverty Alleviation by building capacity of farmers to increase production • Sustainable management of Natural Resources through the Flood Protection programmes and other Sustainable land management practices.

== After 2013 ==
Ndambuki went back to business after taking a break from politics where he is the chairman of Garden Hotel Machakos. He oversees • Developing and executing the company's business strategies. • Providing strategic advice to the Management team. • Preparing and implementing comprehensive business plans to facilitate achievement.

In 2017 he contested for the Gubernatorial Seat for Makueni County under the Jubilee Ticket and lost.

=== 2016–2018 N.S.S.F ===
Ndambuki was appointed as a Non-Executive Chairman to the N.S.S.F by Uhuru Kenyatta the former president of Kenya. He was responsible for • In-charge of growth of the fund • Managed to increase membership to the fund • Actively protected the assets of the funds e.g managed to get back N.S.S.F grabbed lands in Mombasa and Kisumu. • Grew the funds up-to Kshs.200 billion • Managed to reduce cases to the fund

== Other responsibilities ==
Gideon Ndambuki was appointed by the National Council of Churches of Kenya (NCCK) to a panel representing Christians/Muslims to investigate and arbitrate in the Likoni Clashes which pitted Christians against Muslims which saw violence erupt in the Likoni area of Mombasa. The violence saw many churches burnt in Mombasa Province and North Eastern Province.

Throughout his parliamentary services, He led legislators in the session devotion sessions. Every Wednesday at 7.00 a.m. they used to meet at Continental house in one of the halls where they read a few verses from the bible, sang and also discussed the events taking place in the country. This helped M.Ps to lower their emotions against the other side in the house.

== Personal life ==
Gideon Ndambuki is married to Philomena. They have five children.
