= Sikh Temple Makindu, Makindu =

Gurdwara in Nairobi

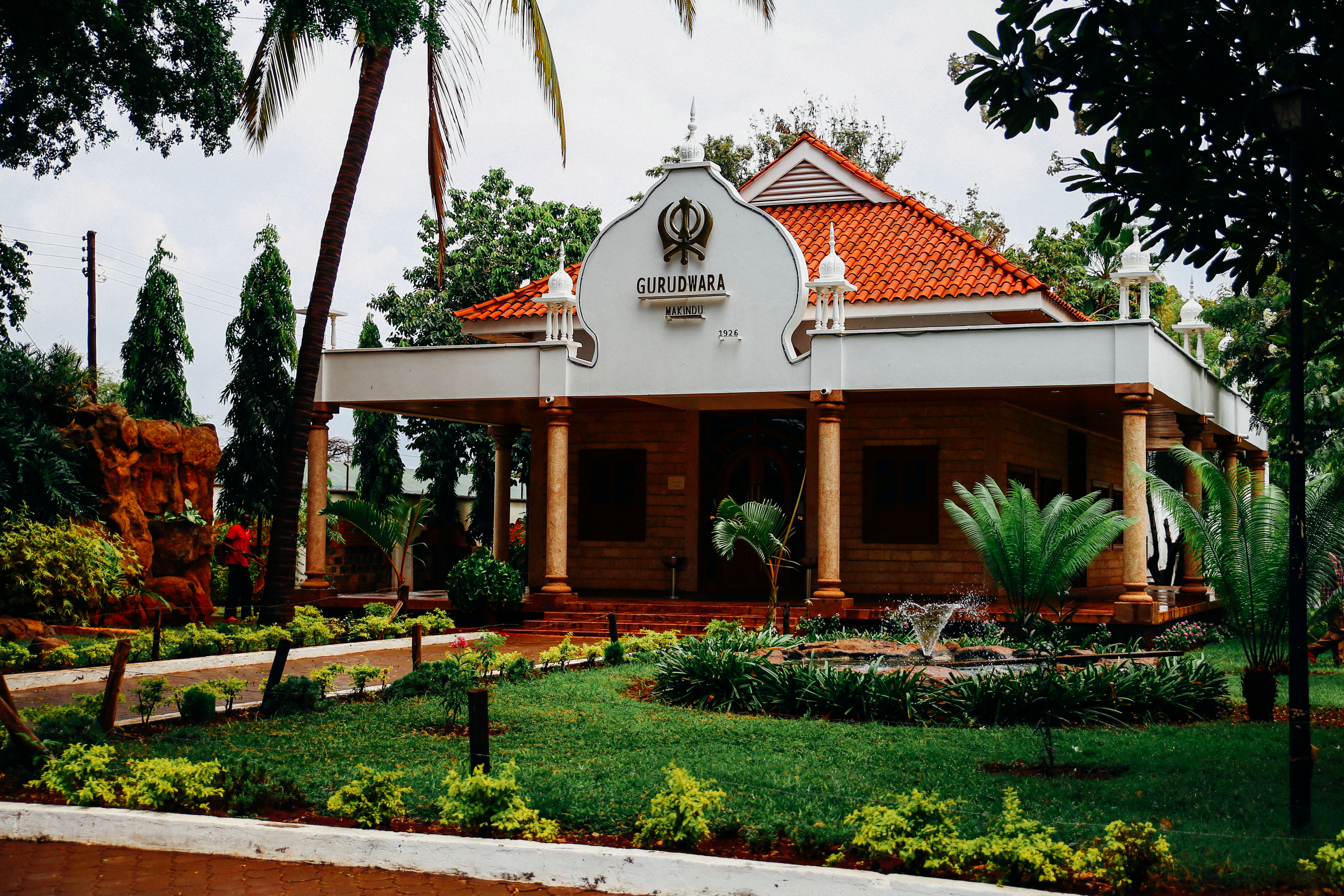
The Sikh Temple, Makindu

Gurdwara Makindu Sahib (Sikh Temple Makindu) is located about 104 miles (170km) from Nairobi on the main Nairobi to Mombasa Road. It was built in 1926 by the Sikhs who were working on the construction of the Uganda railway line from the coast (Mombasa) inland to Lake Victoria and beyond to Uganda.

== Background ==
Set in the forest off the main road, the complex houses a dining facility which provides free langar 24 hours a day.

== History ==
Although the Sikh Temple Makindu was built in 1926, its roots are believed to have been present way before then. When the Uganda Railway was completed in 1902 at Port Florence (which is now Kisumu, Kenya), Makindu played a prominent role as a service point on the railway's advance from Mombasa.

Sikhs, Hindus and Muslims would gather together in the evenings and sing the praises of God. They did so under a tree, the spot where the current Gurdwara now stands. It is also believed that the Gurdwara was funded by non-Sikhs along with Sikhs.

In the years before 1926, the Gurdwara was a tin-roof little hut where the Sikhs used to pray everyday, and the Guru, Guru Granth Sahib was housed there. But when the Railway moved on from Makindu, the service point went into disuse and became unimportant. Sikh devotees who passed along the Gurdwara would leave offerings of money by dropping it through the locked Gurdwara's window.

Now the Makindu Sikh Temple is the first and the second biggest after Kericho Sikh Temple and the most famous in East Africa.

== See also ==
- Gurdwara
- Langar
- Makindu
- Mombasa
- Nairobi
