= Sultan Hamud =

Coordinates: 02°01′00″S 37°22′00″E

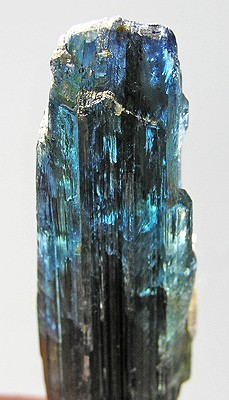
Kyanite specimen mined near Sultan Hamud

Sultan Hamud is a town in Kasikeu division of Makueni County, Kenya. It was previously in the former Nzaui District of Eastern Province. It is located along Nairobi-Mombasa Highway between Emali town and Salama town.

The town is part of Makueni County Council and Kilome Constituency.

== Transport ==
Kenya Railways built a main railway line between the coast at Mombasa and the national capital of Nairobi; Sultan Hamud is a stop on this line. It is also a junction for a short branch line.

== See also ==
- Railway stations in Kenya
