= Katangini Village =

Market village in Matungulu Constituency, Kenya

Katangini is a market village in Matungulu Constituency, located in the lower eastern region of Kenya and about 15 kilometres west of Tala on Thika road. It is 3,000 ft above sea level. it is also approximately 96 Kilometres from the capital of Kenya Nairobi.

== People/Languages ==
The main language spoken is Kikamba although the people who live there understand both Swahili and English.

== Schools ==
Schools within the village include:

- St. Francis of Assis Kwatombe Secondary School
- Katangini Secondary School
- St. Francis of Assis Kwatombe Primary School
- St Getrude Nursery School

== Religion ==
Residents of Katangini are mostly Christians with,

- St. Francis of Assis Catholic Church and
- Redeemed Gospel Church all within the village

== Other amenities ==
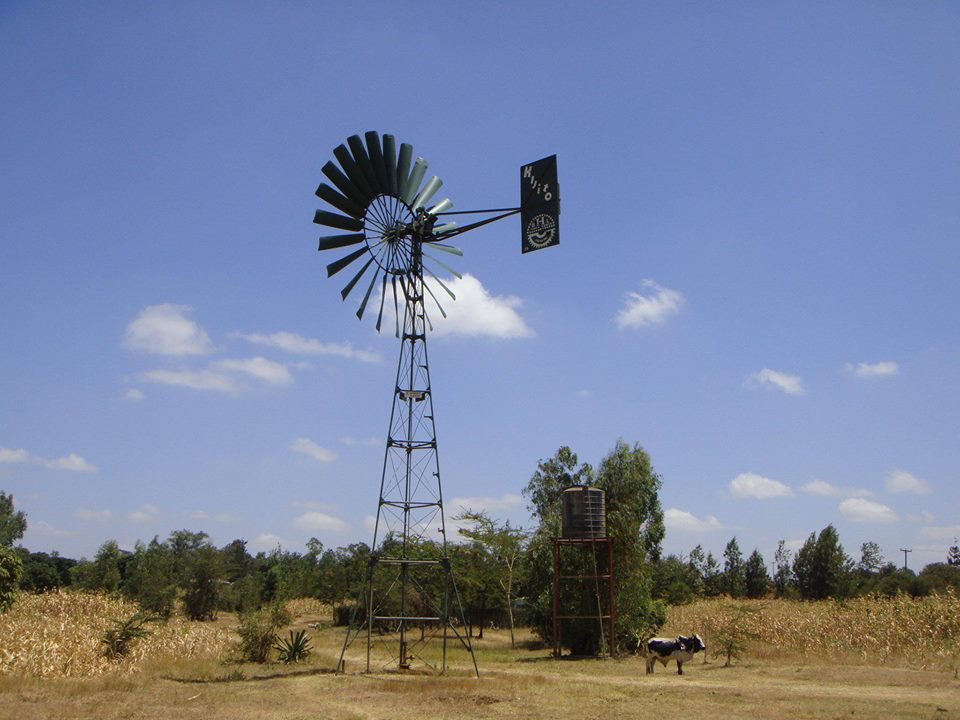
Wind powered pump borehole

- Corrugated weather road (Thika Road) connecting it to Tala
- Kijito Wind pumped bore hole
