= Wote, Kenya =

Coordinates: 1°47′S 37°38′E

Wote
- Town
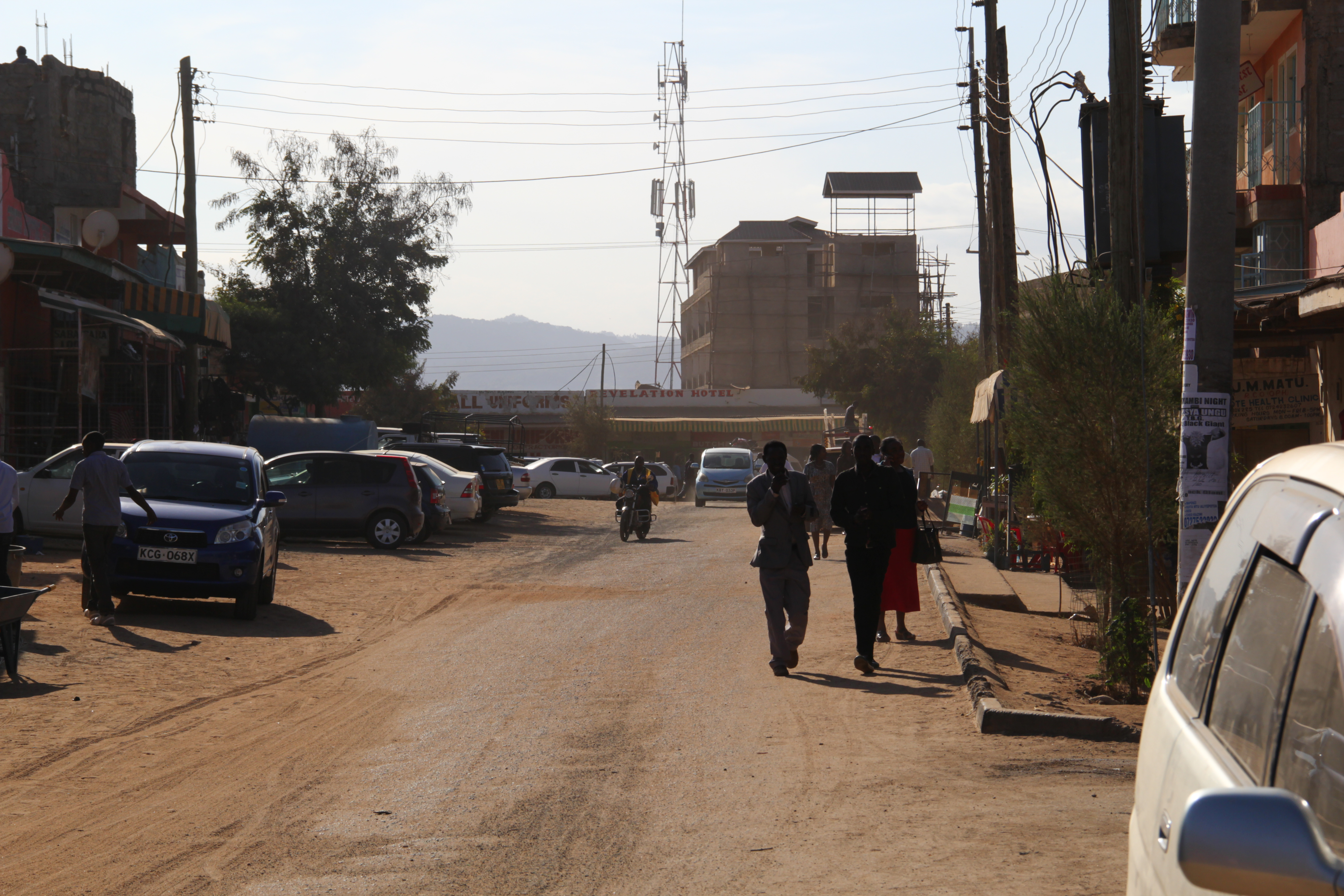
- Street in Wote, 2016

- Location in Kenya
- Country: Kenya
- County: Makueni County

Government
  - Type: County Government
  - Governor: Mutula Kilonzo Jnr
  - Senator: Daniel Kitonga Maanzo
- Elevation: 1,100 m (3,600 ft)

Population (1999 Census)
  - Town: 56,419
  - Urban: 5,542

Wote is a town in Kenya. It is the capital of Makueni County in the former Eastern Province. It forms a town council and had a population of 56,419, of whom 5,542 are classified urban based on the 1999 during population census.

Wote town has six wards: Kako, Kaumoni, Kikumini, Muvau, Nziu and Wote. Most of them are located in Makueni Constituency, but Kako ward belongs to Mbooni Constituency and Kaumoni ward to Kaiti Constituency. Wote is also headquarters of Wote division of Makueni subcounty.
