= Kibwezi =

- Location within Kenya
- Coordinates: 2.42°S 37.97°E
- Country: Kenya
- County: Makueni County
- Time zone: UTC+3 (EAT)

Kibwezi is a town in Makueni County, Kenya.

Kibwezi town is the headquarters of Kibwezi Division, one of 15 administrative divisions in Makueni County. The division has a population of 197,000 people, based on the 2019 Kenya Population and Housing Census, the population of Kibwezi Sub-County (formerly part of the district structure). Based on available data: Population by Sex: 98,477 males and 98,517 females. Population Density: 62.79 people per km². Kibwezi Town Population: 8,143 (2019 Census). Kibwezi West Constituency: Estimated population of 165,925. The area is located within Makueni County and is primarily inhabited by the Akamba people. The division has four locations: Kikumbulyu, Kinyambu, Masongaleni and Utithi. Kibwezi town is located within Kikumbulyu location.

Kibwezi is also named for Kibwezi Constituency, the local electoral constituency. Kibwezi town does not seat a local authority but is part of Makueni County.

== Education ==
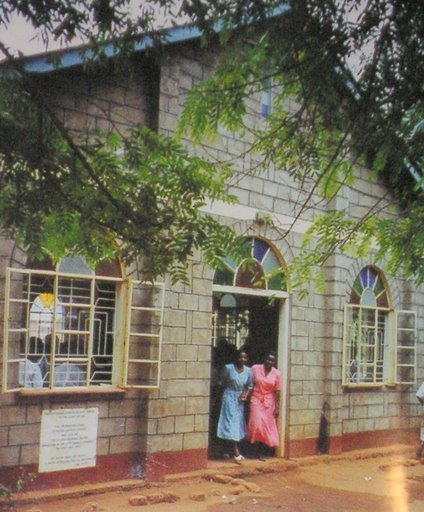
Kibwezi Bethel Church located with the Kibwezi Educational Centre

The largest school is the Kibwezi Educational Centre, a partnership between the Presbyterian Church of East Africa (PCEA) and Burke Presbyterian Church (PCUSA). It contains a polytechnic offering two-year vocational programs in carpentry, masonry, welding, and tailoring. There is also a secretarial department, which requires students to have graduated from secondary school. It has a primary school and preschool for grades one to eight. Scholarships are available for needy students like orphans. There are around thirty children in the Kibwezi area who are supported and given scholarships for educational costs. Students from very needy families benefit from the government-disbursed bursaries.

== Banking and local economy ==
There are five banks and two credit unions in town. The largest bank is the Kenya Commercial Bank, followed by Equity Bank, Cooperative, Sidian Bank, and Post Bank. The Largest Credit Union is the Sidian Bank.

One Microfinance program, run by Empowering the Poor in Development (EPID) - Kenya, partnered with the United States–based 501(c)(3) non-profit, The Walking with Africans Foundation (WAF) focuses on organizing and providing initial funding to Rotating Savings and Credit Association (ROSCA) groups. EPID and WAF jointly oversee 5 ROSCA groups totaling 120 members in the greater Kibwezi area. The program provides initial loans without collateral, allowing members of peer groups the opportunity to co-guarantee repayment of loans and assume management of the revolving fund. The small interest collected from loans is reinvested into lending to more participants. To qualify and remain in the program, participants must meet strict monitoring criteria and pay back the original loans through small weekly repayments and contributions to joint savings. Qualified participants who own small businesses or who seek to establish small business enterprises are extended loans on a short-term repayment cycle (3 to 6 months). WAF was founded by James Munthali, a retired economist with the International Monetary Fund (IMF), and other members of Burke Presbyterian Church in the suburbs of Washington, D.C., United States of America.

M-Pesa is a branchless banking service, meaning that it is designed to enable users to complete basic banking transactions without the need to visit a bank branch. The continuing success of M-Pesa in Kenya has been due to the creation of a highly popular, affordable payment service with only limited involvement of a bank.

== Religion ==
There are several religions represented in the town. There are mosques for the local Muslim community and several churches of varying Christian denominations. The two largest congregations are Catholic and the Presbyterian Church of East Africa (PCEA).

=== African Brotherhood Church ===
ABC church is represented in Kibwezi township with many Branches, including East Africa. Since its inception in 1945, the African Brotherhood Church has grown not only in the country but also in other East and Central African Countries. ABC has active ministries and churches in the Democratic Republic of the Congo, Rwanda, Tanzania, and Uganda, and still continues to grow its reach in mission.

=== Support for education ===
ABC Primary Schools Include; ILALAMBYU ITHENGELI KAKETI KAKULI KALULUINI (KOMA) KAMUTISYA KANGONDI KANYONGO KANZAUWU KASEVI KATHANGATHINI KAVINGO KEAA KINGONGOI KISEKINI KISOLE KISOVO KITHIMA KITONGUNI KITULU KWA KASAU KWAKATHEKA KWAKATIA KWAMINGIO KWANGENGI KYAANI KANGUUTHENI KYAMUSIVI KYANDA KYANGUNGA KYANGUYU MAKUMBI MALUMA MASAANI MATHUNZUU MITHINIMALATANI MUKAA MULUTI MUSUKINI MUUA MUUKUNI MUUNGUU MWAMBUNI NZATANI OBUOR SEEKEA SIKA SYOMBUKU WAMUNYU

ABC Partners & Affiliates Undugu TV Eastern Kenya Integrated College Manee Kenya Discipleship International ABC SACCO National Council of Churches of Kenya (NCCK) World Council of Churches (WCC) All Africa Conference of Churches (AACC) Canadian Baptist Ministries https://www.africabrotherhoodchurch.org/

=== Presbyterian ===
Kibwezi is defined by the Presbyterian Church of East Africa as a Nendeni Area, a region for church growth. There is one church located inside the Kibwezi Educational Centre. This has been named the Bethel Church. Furthermore, there are approximately 14 smaller congregations in the surrounding villages near Kibwezi. The village churches are served on Sunday by evangelists (not pastors) employed by the Kibwezi Bethel Church. A few of these areas are:

- Kikauni
- Mbui-nzau
- Usalama
- Muusini
- Maikuu
- Misuuni
- Masongaleni
- Kyumani
- Makindu
- Kisingo
- Kilema

Kibwezi has other churches, e.g., Seventh Day Adventist Church near Kambua Guest House and opposite Kibwezi Teachers College; the Kenya Assemblies of God located at Muthaiga Estate; the Redeemed Gospel Church also at Muthaiga; the Pentecostal Assemblies of God; the African Brotherhood church at Maweni; and the Full Gospel Churches of Kenya. These are the Pentecostal Churches Of Kibwezi.

== Transport ==
The most common form of transport is public minivans and buses. Within the town and its adjacent areas, motorbikes and bicycles bodaboda are commonly used.

It has a station on the Uganda Railway between Mombasa and Nairobi. There is also a station for the new Mombasa-Nairobi Standard Gauge Railway a few kilometers from the town centre.

The town is located along the Nairobi – Mombasa highway. Another road connects Kibwezi with Kitui.

== See also ==
- Transport in Kenya
- Rail transport in Kenya
- Railway stations in Kenya
