= Jessica Nduku Kiko Mbalu =

Kenyan politician

Member of the National Assembly
- Incumbent
- Assumed office 2022
- Constituency: Kibwezi East Constituency

Personal details
- Party: WDM-K
- Education: University of Nairobi

Jessica Nduku Kiko Mbalu is a Kenyan politician from the WDM-K. She represents the Kibwezi East Constituency in the National Assembly. She is a member of the Kenya Women Parliamentary Association (KEWOPA). The association includes parliamentary women from the National Assembly and the Senate.

== Private life ==
Mbalu is a wife and mother of two children and a graduate of the University of Nairobi. She is of Ukambani heritage.

== See also ==
- 13th Parliament of Kenya
