= Kibwezi West Constituency =

Kibwezi West
- constituency
- Country: Kenya
- County: Makueni County

Kibwezi West is a constituency in Kenya. It is one of six constituencies in Makueni County.

Its current Member of Parliament is Mwengi Mutuse MP, who was elected in September 2022 as a United Democrtic Alliance(UDA) candidate.
