= Mtito Andei =

- Town
- Location in Kenya; Placement on map is approximate
- Coordinates: 2°41′S 38°10′E
- Country: Kenya
- County: Makueni County
- Elevation: 731 m (2,398 ft)

Population (2010 Estimate)
  - Total: 4,760

Mtito Andei is a town in Makueni County, Kenya.

== Location ==
Mtito Andei is located in Makueni County, in the country's southeastern region, 233 kilometres (145 mi), by road southeast of Nairobi, the capital. The geographic coordinates of Mtito Andei are: 2°41'24"S, 38°10'12"E (Latitude: −2.69000; Longitude: 38.17000).

From Mtito Andei to Voi is a distance of 96 km.

== Overview ==
Mtito Andei is a small town on the Mombasa to Nairobi Railway and Highway. It lies at the western edge of Tsavo National Park and two entrance gates into the park are located in the town. The town is administered by Mtito Andei Town Council which serves as the sub-county headquarters for Mtito Andei Sub-county in which the town is located.

== Population ==
According to the 1999 Kenya National Census, Mtito Andei's urban population was counted at 4,304 (1999 Census). In 2010, the population of the town was estimated at 4,760.

== Transport ==
Mtito Andei lies on the main rail line of Kenya Railways, between Mombasa and Nairobi. The town is also served by Mtito Andei Airport. The main thoroughfare going through town is the Mombasa-Nairobi Road (A109). Going south east, the road continues on to Tsavo, then Voi and eventually Mombasa. Going north west, the road goes through Kibwezi and Sultan Hamud, before entering Nairobi.

== Points of interest ==
The points of interest located in Mtito Andei or close to its borders include the following:

- The offices of Mtito Andei Town Council
- The Nairobi-Mombasa Road – The road passes through the middle of town in a northwest to southeast direction
- The Mombasa-Nairobi Railway Line – The railway runs parallel to the Road
- Mtito Andei Central Market
- The Mtito Andei Post Office
- Tsavo National Park – The town lies just outside the park. Two gates to the national park are located in Mtito Andei; one to the south and another to the northeast of town.
- Mtito Andei Airport

== See also ==
- Transport in Kenya
- Railway stations in Kenya
