= Peter Kiilu =

Kenyan politician (died 2020)

Member of Parliament for the Makueni Constituency
- In office 2007–2013
- Preceded by: Kivutha Kibwana
- Succeeded by: Daniel K. Maanzo

Personal details
- Born: February 20, 1951 Nairobi, Kenya
- Died: May 19, 2020

Peter Kiilu (died 19 May 2020) was a Kenyan politician. In the 2007 Kenyan parliamentary election, he was elected to the National Assembly of Kenya as a member of the Orange Democratic Movement-Kenya (later the Wiper Democratic Movement) representing the Makueni Constituency. In the 2013 Kenyan general election, he ran on the National Rainbow Coalition (NARC) ticket. Daniel K. Maanzo defeated him.
