= Charles Kilonzo =

Kenyan politician

Mutavi Charles Kilonzo is a Kenyan politician. He belongs to the Orange Democratic Movement-Kenya and was elected to represent the Yatta Constituency in the National Assembly of Kenya since the 2007 Kenyan general election.
