= Mukaa =

Village in Makueni County, Kenya

Coordinates: 1°51′S 37°19′E

Mukaa is a ward in Makueni County, Kenya with around 26500 inhabitants as estimated in 2011 census. Mukaa was founded in the late 19th century by AIM (Africa Inland Mission, Later Africa Inland Church) Missionaries. They built a church.

== Historical Background ==
The area became a hub for evangelical outreach and education, with institutions such as Mukaa Primary School, Mukaa Boys High School, and the AIC Mukaa Children’s Home emerging around the mission center.Mukaa Ward is governed under the County Government of Makueni, with administrative oversight provided by the Independent Electoral and Boundaries Commission (IEBC).

== County ==
Mukaa is one of the wards in Kilome Sub-county, which is part of Makueni County, governed under Kenya’s devolved system. The county government officially lists Mukaa as one of its electoral wards Kilome Constituency has the following Kasikeu, Mukaa and Kiima Kiu wrads

== Institutions ==
1. Mukaa A.I.C Church (Founded 1888)
2. Sakini Kenya Assemblies Of God
3. Mukaa Primary School
4. A.I.C Mukaa Children's Home
5. Mukaa Boys High School
6. AIC Mukaa Dispensary
