= Malka Mari =

- Location within Kenya
- Coordinates: 4.27°N 40.78°E
- Country: Kenya
- County: Mandera County
- Time zone: UTC+3 (EAT)

Malka Mari is a settlement in Kenya's Mandera County (former North Eastern Province). Owed to its high concentration of wildlife, Malka Mari National Park was gazetted in the year 1989. The park is situated along the Kenya-Ethiopia border along the Daua River. The river is in the extreme north eastern part of the country on the Mandera plateau. The climate in Malka Mari National Park is hot and dry, implying that the area scrubby and semi arid grassland is dominant. The Daua River is surrounded by palms and riparian woodland.

The major attractions of the Malka Mari National Park include Malkamari fort, valleys and hills. These physical features provide beautiful and attractive scenery, creating a worthwhile experience for tourists and visitors. Malka Mari National Park can potentially be considered as the most remote national park in Kenya.

There has been no permanent human settlements owing to the very arid and inhospitable climate of the region. The common inhabitants of the park are nomadic herders of the Gurreh community, though they are few in number and mostly dispersed over a wide region. Karache Urane is located at the southern end of Malka Mari National Park. The Southern part on the other hand hosts the Awara Plains. The boundary of the park to the north terminates on the Kenya-Ethiopia border. Therefore the extreme ends of Malka Mari National Park can serve as major tourist attraction sites.

Visitors should be informed that it is extremely difficult and such a long journey to get to Malka Mari National Park by road. The first step is to take the A2 route of the Northern Road to Isiolo and then proceed to Moyale found on the Ethiopian border. From Moyale, you take the D504 road on the eastern side through the Yabdus and Sara hills for around 160 kilometers before reaching Banissa, a semi-permanent village that hosts an airstrip.

Another alternative route that drivers may opt to take is that of Wajir. There are two roads leading to Wajir. The first one is along B9 from Mado Gashi while the second route is from Dadaab at the north eastern part of Garissa, and then proceeds along the B9 route to Tarba. A visitor should proceed further north for about 200 kilometers along d500 prior to reaching Banissa.

Owed to the long distance as well as the poor road conditions at the north eastern part of the country, visitors should consider another alternative means to reach Malka Mari National Park. The best option that a visitor should consider is to charter a plane. There are two airstrips that can be used as a means of arriving at Malka Mari National Park. The first airstrip is located at Bannissa while the second one is a small airstrip that is situated in the park.
