= Kivutha Kibwana =

Kenyan politician

Professor Kivutha Kibwana

1st Governor of Makueni County
- In office 27 March 2013 – 25 August 2022

Member of the Kenyan Parliament
- In office 2003–2007
- Preceded by: Peter Maundu
- Succeeded by: Peter Kiilu
- Constituency: Makueni

Personal details
- Born: 13 June 1954 (age 72) Mwanyani, Nzaui District, Kenya Protectorate
- Party: Muungano Development Movement Party (MDM)
- Education: University of Nairobi (LLB); University of London (LLM); George Washington University
- Religion: Christian

Kivutha Kibwana (born June 13, 1954) is a Kenyan politician and human rights activist. He was Minister for Defence, Minister for Environment and a former member of parliament for the Makueni Constituency. He is also a former advisor to President Mwai Kibaki. Prof. Kibwana's second term as the first Governor of Makueni County ended in 2022.

== Early life and education ==
Kibwana was born in 1954 in Mwanyani, a remote part located in Nzaui District, Makueni County.

He studied at Nduundune Primary School. He later attended Machakos School (1969-1973) for his O’ and A’ Levels. He obtained a bachelor's degree in law (Upper Second Class Honours) from the University of Nairobi in 1976 and a Master of Law. He also went to the University of London and George Washington University. He graduated from Harvard University with an LLM in June 1984. He later studied Master of Theology in Mission Studies (MTh) at the Africa International University, Nairobi.

== Career ==
He was the spokesperson of the National Convention Executive Council (NCEC) from 1997 to 2002. At the University of Nairobi, he also served as the Associate Professor (1977-2002), Dean of the Faculty of Law, a senior lecturer, and chairman of the Department of Private Law

In 2002, he became a Member of Parliament for Makueni Constituency and Minister of both Land and Settlements and Environment & Natural Resources.

In January 2008, he was appointed as Presidential Advisor for Constitutional, Parliamentary & Youth Affairs in the President's Office and served until September 2012.

=== Makueni County Governor ===
During the Kenyan general elections of 2013, Prof. Kibwana was elected as the first governor of Makueni County under the Muungano Development Movement Party which he was leading. Disagreements with majority of members of the Makueni County Assembly who belonged to the Wiper Democratic Movement Party had him consider resigning from the position of governor in the same year he was elected. While Prof. Kibwana did not resign, a petition was filed to suspend Makueni County citing that the Kibwana-led executive and the assembly were operating at extreme levels of disagreement. The sharp disagreements persisted to the extent that a commission appointed by President Uhuru Kenyatta recommended the dissolution of the county government. The commission's recommendation was overruled by President Kenyatta.

In 2017, Professor Kibwana's Muungano party entered a pre-election pact with the Wiper Democratic Movement Party. Kibwana was appointed chairman of the Wiper Democratic Movement Party. Professor Kibwana was subsequently re-elected as Makueni Governor for a second term as Governor for Makueni County at the 2017 general elections. One year after being elected, Kibwana fell out with Kalonzo Musyoka, the Wiper Democratic Movement Party Leader. This led to the admonishment of Prof. Kibwana by other politicians belonging to the Wiper party. The fallout culminated in an announcement by Kalonzo Musyoka that the agreement between Muungano Party and the Wiper Party had expired. Prof. Kibwana also claimed that he would have been re-elected regardless of the pre-election pact with the Wiper party. In July 2019, Prof. Kivutha was replaced as Chairman of the Wiper party by Chirau Ali Mwakwere.

==== Performance as governor ====
In the final fiscal year of Prof. Kibwana's first term as governor, Makueni County registered an unspent development budget amounting to 1.5 Billion Kenya Shillings (about 15 million US Dollars). A report of the Auditor General's Office for the subsequent fiscal year 2017/18 ranked Prof. Kibwana's Makueni Government alongside Nyandarua County Government as the best in the use of public funds. This was the first fiscal year of Prof. Kibwana's second term as Makueni Governor. In early 2018, media reports depicted Prof. Kibwana as the most well-performing of Kenya's 47 Governors. The reports linked this to Makueni County's implementation of Universal Health Care and its support of agro-processing for the economic empowerment of farmers

=== 2022 presidential ambition ===
Prof. Kibwana expressed interest in vying to be the 5th president of the Republic of Kenya in the 2022 general elections. This is despite views that he will be endorsing the candidacy of the incumbent deputy president Dr. William Samoei Arap Ruto. In an October 2019 interview, Prof. Kibwana showed hesitance in vying for the Presidency terming a presidential campaign so expensive that one has to have accumulated immense wealth to afford vying. He indicated that he would be willing to serve as a pro bono president if his basic needs were met. Prof. Kibwana's presidential bid will be after serving a maximum of two five-year terms as Governor of Makueni County as per the Kenyan Constitution
