= Keroka =

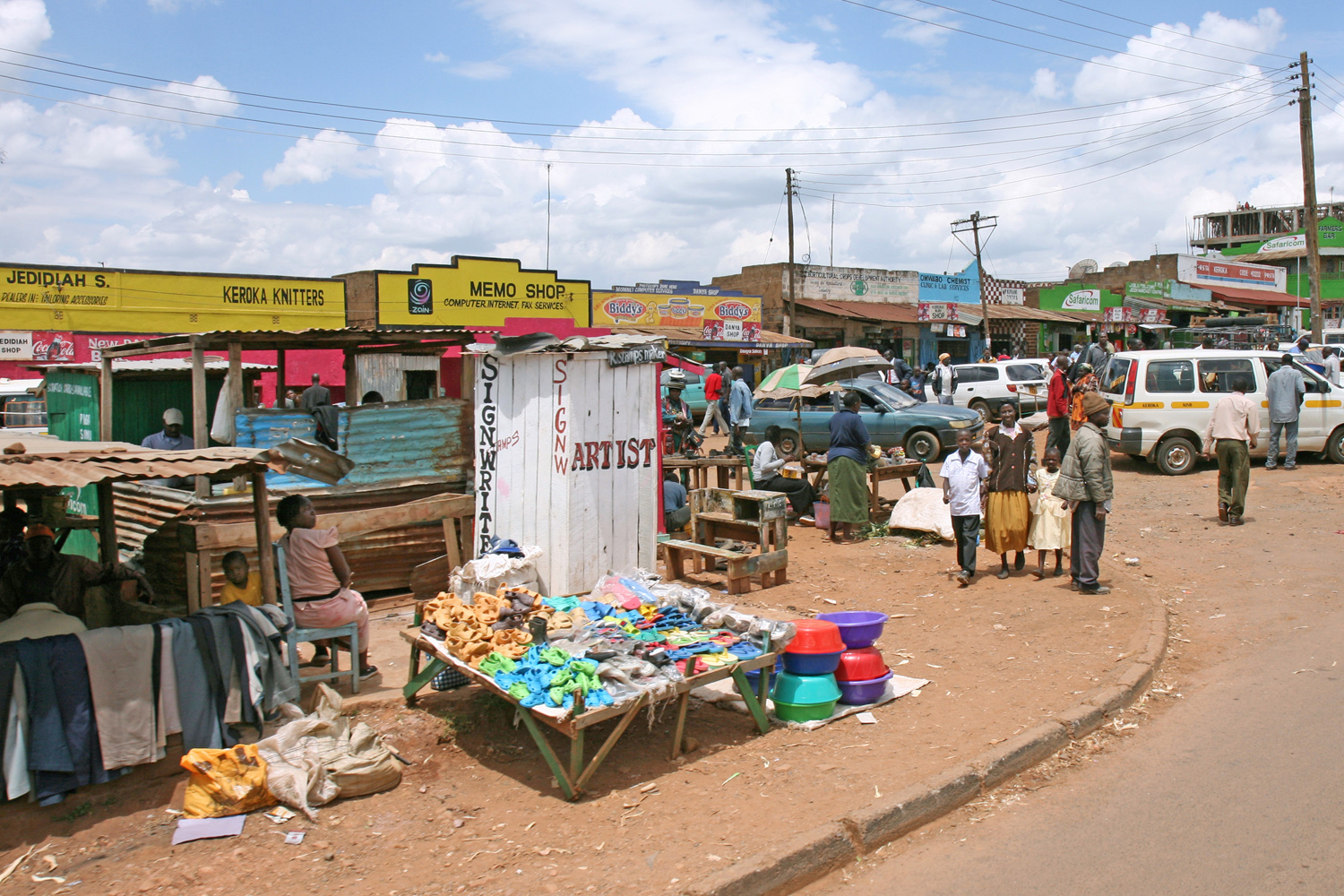
- Country: Kenya
- County: Kisii County Nyamira County

Population (2009)
  - City: 50,000
  - Urban: 30,000
  - Metro: 20,000
- Time zone: UTC+3 (EAT)

Keroka is a town located in Kenya's Nyamira and Kisii counties. It is the largest town in Nyamira county after Nyamira Town.

Keroka is mainly inhabited by the Abagusii people and lies in the middle of Kisii-Sotik highway. It serves as a trading and administrative post, having started as a business centre at Nyabiemba near the border of the borabu settlement scheme. Keroka is the terminus for various national bus lines like Transline, Guardian Angel and Nyamira Express.

The majority of the town's inhabitants are Seventh Day Adventists. the town in recent times has a major infrastructural development such as a modern car park, a modern market stall near kisumu ndogo area. major supermarkets such supamatt and neema operate in the area. There are many bars and restaurants in the area. Several medical facilities, including Med-Stop Hospital, med forte, omwabo chemists Keroka sub-county Hospital and Gucha Hospital are located in the town.
