= Kibwezi East Constituency =

Kibwezi East
- constituency
- Country: Kenya
- County: Makueni County

Kibwezi East is a constituency in Kenya. It is one of six constituencies in Makueni County.

== Members of Parliament ==
Elections	MP	Party	Notes
2022	Jessica Nduku Kiko Mbalu	WDM-K	
