= Makindu =

- Location within Kenya
- Coordinates: 2.2750°S 37.8200°E
- Country: Kenya
- County: Makueni County
- Elevation: 1,070 m (3,510 ft)
- Time zone: UTC+3 (EAT)

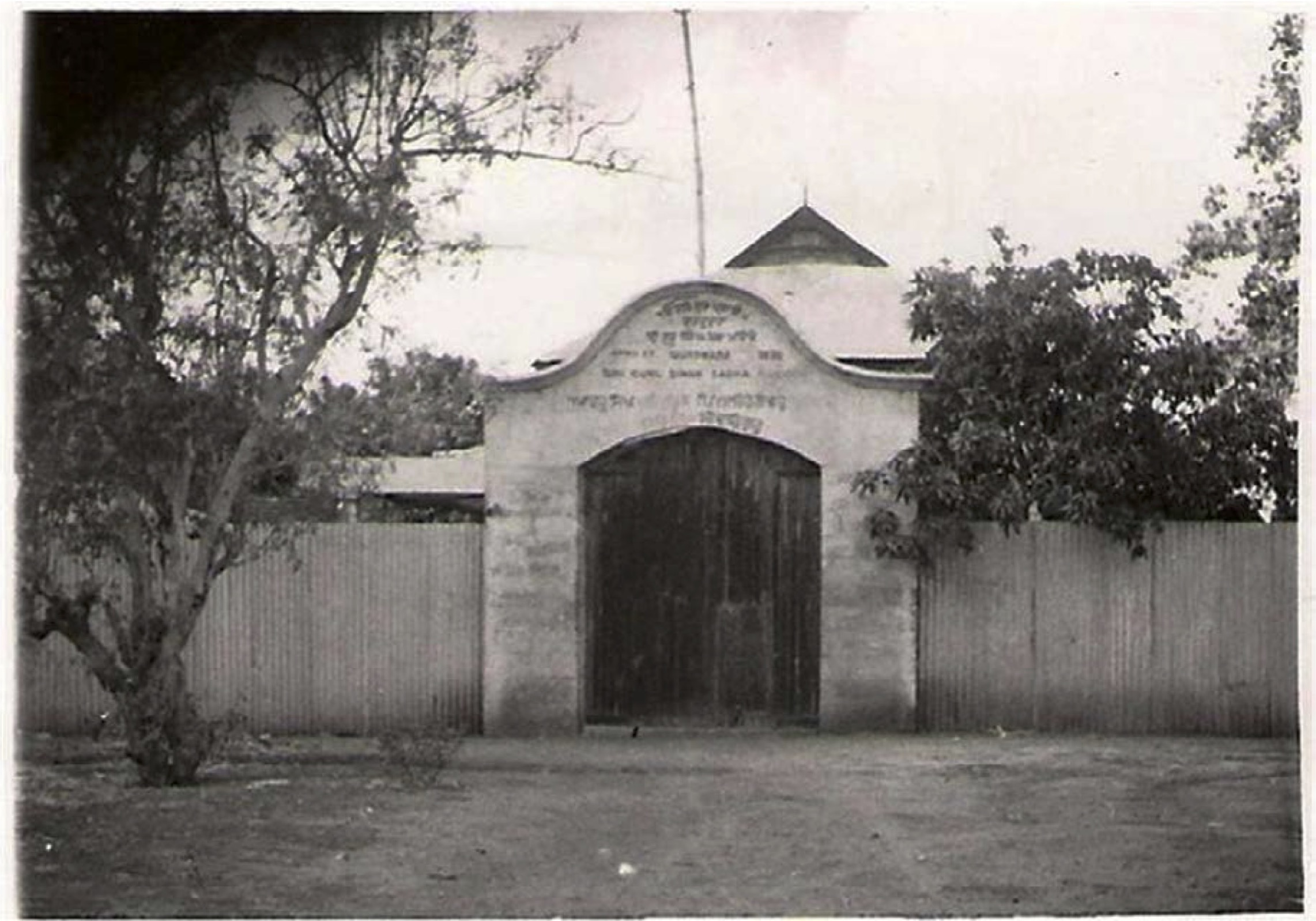
Sikh gurdwara at Makindu, 1935

Makindu is a town in Makueni County, Kenya.

== Location ==
The town is located on the Nairobi-Mombasa Highway, in Makueni County, in southeastern Kenya on the map, close to the International border with the Tanzania.

This location lies approximately 135 kilometres (84 mi), by road, southeast of Machakos, where the provincial headquarters are located. Makindu lies approximately 356 kilometres (221 mi), by road, northwest of the coastal city of Mombasa. The geographic coordinates of Makindu are: 2° 16' 30.00"S, 37° 49' 12.00"E (Latitude: -2.275000; 37.820000).

== Overview ==
The settlement was established in the early 20th century, as a base for railway construction workers on the Mombasa-Kampala railway project. The Sikh Temple in Makindu that was built at that time, still bears reminiscence to the railway building days. The temple was a place of worship and social centre for many of the workers from India. The temple is well preserved and is managed as a free lodge for any traveller who knocks on its doors. Makindu is also served by Makindu Airport.

== Climate ==
Makindu has an altitude-moderated hot semi-arid climate (Köppen BSh) with very warm to hot afternoons and pleasant mornings throughout the year. Like most of Kenya, there are two rainy seasons: the “long rains” in March and April, and the “short rains” centred on November and December.

Climate data for Makindu
Month	Jan	Feb	Mar	Apr	May	Jun	Jul	Aug	Sep	Oct	Nov	Dec	Year
Mean daily maximum °C (°F)	29.0 (84.2)	30.7 (87.3)	30.8 (87.4)	29.5 (85.1)	28.3 (82.9)	27.4 (81.3)	26.4 (79.5)	26.8 (80.2)	28.6 (83.5)	29.8 (85.6)	28.5 (83.3)	27.6 (81.7)	28.6 (83.5)
Mean daily minimum °C (°F)	17.3 (63.1)	17.8 (64.0)	18.4 (65.1)	18.5 (65.3)	16.9 (62.4)	14.7 (58.5)	13.8 (56.8)	14.2 (57.6)	15.1 (59.2)	16.9 (62.4)	18.0 (64.4)	17.8 (64.0)	16.6 (61.9)
Average rainfall mm (inches)	42 (1.7)	30 (1.2)	77 (3.0)	113 (4.4)	29 (1.1)	2 (0.1)	1 (0.0)	1 (0.0)	2 (0.1)	28 (1.1)	172 (6.8)	115 (4.5)	612 (24)
Average rainy days	4	3	7	10	3	1	2	2	1	4	11	8	56
Source: World Meteorological Organization

== Population ==
The current population of the town of Makindu is not publicly known.

== Points of interest ==
Makindu or its environs, is the location of the following points of interest:

- Makindu Sikh Temple – Constructed in the early 20th century
- Makueni General Hospital – Owned and administered by the Kenya Ministry of Health
- Makindu Centre of Hope – A private hospital
- Makindu Post Office
- The Nairobi–Mombasa Highway – The highway passes through the middle of town in a northwest to southeast direction
- Chyulu Hills National Park – One of the entrance lies about 8 kilometres (5.0 mi), by road, south east of the central business district
- Makindu Airport – A public, civilian airfield
- Kenya Medical Training College
- Makindu Livestock Market on all Mondays

== See also ==
- Makindu Airport
- Makueni County
- Eastern Province (Kenya)
- Makindu Sikh Temple
