= Local authorities of Kenya =

Bodies controlling local governance in urban areas in Kenya

Local authorities in Kenya are the bodies controlling local governance in urban areas in Kenya.

From the 2013 general elections onwards Kenya will have three classes of local authorities: City, Municipality, and Town authorities. Subject to the Urban Areas and Cities Act of 2011, there are five authorities with city status: Nairobi, the national capital, Mombasa, Kisumu, Nakuru and Eldoret. Municipalities and towns are other forms of urban authorities and are generally named after their central town.

Local authorities usually differ from divisional and constituency boundaries used by the state administration.

Under the former act of parliament local authority administration consisted of a mayor, town clerk and councillors. The number of councillors depended on population and area of each authority and they were elected by the public during the Kenya general elections held every five years or by-elections held in between. Authorities were divided into wards and each ward elects only one councillor. Wards have often common boundaries with administrative locations.

Compared to many other countries, local authorities in Kenya were weak and are shadowed by state run administration. However, during the international Africities summit held in Nairobi September 2006, the Kenyan president Mwai Kibaki promised to strengthen local authorities.

Under Kenya's new devolved system of government, the elected councils were dissolved and are set to be replaced by boards, in the case of city councils, and administrators, in the case of municipal and town councils, appointed by the county governments.

== List of local authorities in Kenya ==
These are the local authorities, dissolved in 2013, that operated under the old local authorities act.

== Nairobi County ==
  - Nairobi city

== Kiambu County ==
  - Kiambu municipality
  - Kiambu county council
  - Limuru municipality
  - Kikuyu town council
  - Karuri town council
- Thika District
  - Thika municipality
  - Thika county council
  - Ruiru municipality
  - Juja Municipality

== Kirinyaga County ==
  - Kerugoya/Kutus municipality
  - Kirinyaga county council
  - Sagana town council

== Nyandarua County ==
  - Ol Kalou town council
  - Nyandarua county council

== Nyeri County ==
  - Nyeri municipality
  - Nyeri county council
  - Karatina municipality
  - Othaya town council

== Murang'a County ==
- Murang'a District
  - Murang'a municipality
  - Murang'a county council
  - Kangema town council
- Maragua District
  - Maragua town council
  - Maragua county council
  - Kandara town council
  - Makuyu town council

== Kilifi County ==
  - Kilifi town council
  - Kilifi county council
  - Mariakani town council Malindi District
    - Malindi municipality
    - Malindi county council

== Kwale County ==
  - Kwale town council
  - Kwale county council

== Lamu County ==
  - Lamu county council

== Mombasa County ==
  - Mombasa municipality

== Taita-Taveta County ==
  - Taita-Taveta county council
  - Taveta town council
  - Voi municipality

== Tana River County ==
  - Tana river- Hola
  - Tana delta- Garseni
  - Tana north - Bura

== Embu County ==
  - Embu municipality
  - Embu county council
  - Runyenjes municipality
- Mbeere District
  - Mbeere county council

== Isiolo County ==
  - Isiolo county council

== Kitui County ==
  - Kitui municipality
  - Kitui county council
- Mwingi District
  - Mwingi town council
  - Mwingi county council

== Makueni County ==
  - Wote town council
  - Makueni county council
  - Mtito Andei town council

== Machakos County ==
  - Machakos municipality
  - Masaku county council
  - Mavoko municipality (Athi River town)
  - Kangundo town council
  - Matuu town council

== Marsabit County ==
  - Marsabit county council
  - Moyale county council

== Meru County ==
- Meru Central District
  - Meru municipality
  - Meru county council
- Meru North District (Nyambene District)
  - Maua 0796845615municipality
  - Myambene county council

== Tharaka-Nithi County ==
- Meru South District
  - Chuka municipality
  - Chogoria town council
  - Meru south county council
- Tharaka District
  - Tharaka county council

== Garissa County ==
  - Garissa municipality
  - Garissa county council
- Ijara District
  - Ijara county council

== Mandera County ==
  - Mandera town council
  - Mandera county council

== Wajir County ==
  - Wajir county council

== Homa Bay County ==
  - Homa Bay municipality
  - Homa Bay county council

== Kisii County ==
- Kisii Central District
  - Kisii municipality
  - Gusii county council
  - Keroka town council
  - Suneka town council
  - Masimba town council

== Nyamira County ==
  - Nyamira town council
  - Nyamira county council
  - Nyansiongo town council
- Gucha District
  - Ogembo town council
  - Gucha county council
  - Nyamarambe town council
  - Nyamache town council
  - Tabaka town council

== Kisumu County ==
  - Kisumu municipality
  - Kisumu county council

== Migori County ==
- Kuria District
  - Kehancha municipality
- Migori District
  - Migori municipality
  - Migori county council
  - Rongo town council
  - Awendo town council
- Rachuonyo District
  - Oyugis town council
  - Kendu Bay town council
  - Rachuonyo county council

== Siaya County ==
  - Siaya municipality
  - Siaya county council
  - Yala town council
  - Ugunja town council
  - Ukwala town council
- Suba District
  - Mbita Point town council
  - Suba county council
- Bondo District
  - Bondo town council
  - Bondo county council

== Baringo County ==
- Baringo District
  - Kabarnet municipality
  - Baringo county council

== Bomet County ==
  - Bomet municipality
  - Bomet county council
- Buret District
  - Litein town council
  - Buret county council
  - Sotik town council

== Elgeyo Marakwet County ==
- Keiyo District
  - Iten/Tambach town council
  - Keiyo county council
- Marakwet District
  - Marakwet county council

== Kajiado County ==
  - Kajiado town council
  - Olkejuado county council

== Kericho County ==
  - Kericho municipality
  - Kipsigis county council
  - Londiani town council
  - Kipkelion town council
- Koibatek District
  - Eldama Ravine town council
  - Koibatek county council

== Laikipia County ==
  - Nanyuki municipality
  - Laikipia county council
  - Nyahururu municipality
  - Rumuruti town council

== Nakuru County ==
  - Nakuru city
  - Nakuru County Council
  - Naivasha municipality
  - Molo municipality
  - Gilgil municipality

== Nandi County ==
  - Kapsabet municipality
  - Nandi county council
  - Nandi Hills town council

== Narok County ==
  - Narok town council
  - Narok county council
- Trans Mara District
  - Trans Mara county council (Kilgoris)

== Samburu County ==
  - Maralal town council
  - Samburu county council

== Trans-Nzoia County ==
  - Kitale municipality
  - Nzoia county council

== Turkana County ==
  - Lodwar municipality
  - Turkana county council

== Uasin Gishu County ==
  - Eldoret municipality
  - Wareng county council
  - Burnt Forest town council
  - moi's bridges town Council

== West Pokot County ==
  - Kapenguria municipality
  - Pokot county council
  - Chepareria town council

== Bungoma County ==
  - Bungoma municipality
  - Bungoma county council
  - Kimilili municipality
  - Sirisia town council
  - Malakisi town council
  - Webuye municipality
- Mount Elgon District
  - Mount Elgon county council

== Busia County ==
  - Busia municipality
  - Busia county council
  - Funyula town council
  - Nambale town council
  - Port Victoria town council
- Teso District
  - Malaba town council
  - Teso county council

== Kakamega County ==
  - Kakamega municipality
  - Kakamega county council
  - Malava town council
- Butere/Mumias District
  - Butere-Mumias county council
  - Mumias municipality
- Lugari District
  - Lugari county council

== Vihiga County ==
  - Vihiga municipality
  - Vihiga county council
  - Luanda town council

== See also ==
- Subdivisions of Kenya
