= Kethi Kilonzo =

Kenyan lawyer, lecturer and accountant (born 1977)

- Born: 21 February 1977 (age 49); Makueni
- Education: The Kenya High School & University of Nairobi
- Occupation: Lawyer
- Years active: 1999–present
- Employer(s): Kilonzo and company advocates
- Website: kilonzoadvocates.co.ke

Kethi Diana Kilonzo (born 21 February 1977) is a Kenyan lawyer, lecturer and accountant. She is the daughter of the late Makueni Senator Mutula Kilonzo and is most notable for her performance as the head counsel for Africa Centre for Open Governance's petition against the declaration of Uhuru Kenyatta as the President of Kenya. Kethi Diana Kilonzo argued against the results announced by IEBC Chairman Ahmed Issack Hassan and cited the results as not credible. The petition, which had been filed alongside that of the Coalition for Reforms and Democracy, sought to nullify the 2013 election, which the two petitioners claimed to have been altered by the first respondent (IEBC, Independent Electoral and Boundaries Commission) under the leadership of the second respondent (Isaack Hassan) to the advantage of the third and fourth respondents that is the president and deputy president of Kenya, respectively. The petition was heard by a panel of six Supreme Court judges, headed by Willy Mutunga.

On 19 July 2013, her petition against the electoral commission was thrown out, with the court upholding the IEBC's decision to nullify her nomination to run for the Makueni Senate seat. Kethi could face jail for possession of stolen property and for electoral fraud.

== Recognition ==
Kethi was recognized as the best student in Advanced Taxation (ATX-UK) exam being ranked 23rd globally.The Advanced Taxation (ATX-UK) exam is designed to equip candidates with the skills to advise both individuals and businesses on how major UK taxes affect their financial decisions.
