= Emali =

- Location within Kenya
- Coordinates: 2.08°S 37.47°E
- Country: Kenya
- County: Makueni County
- Time zone: UTC+3 (EAT)

Emali is a town located along the Mombasa-Nairobi highway in Kenya straddling the Makueni County and Kajiado County boundaries. It is a popular resting place for truck drivers ferrying goods from the Mombasa port to inland destinations such as Nairobi, Kampala, Kigali and even the Democratic Republic of the Congo. It is known as "the town that never sleeps" due to its vibrant night life. The town is inhabited by the Kamba and Maasai tribes.

== Boundary ==
The railway line is the constitutional boundary cutting Emali into two. The northeastern portion administratively belongs to Makueni County while the Southwestern portion belongs to Kajiado County.

== Geography ==
Emali is on a flat land and has red volcanic soil. Crops grown include maize, beans and pigeon peas. The town is undergoing infrastructure development by the national government and the county governments of Kajiado and Makueni.

It experiences a warm climate throughout the year and has two rainy seasons in October and March.

== Transport ==
The old one meter gauge railway passes through Emali. One of the nine stations on the new Mombasa–Nairobi Standard Gauge Railway is also located in Emali. There are also two intersecting roads; one from Emali to Wote ( the County Capital of Makueni) and another to Oloitokitok (Border town to Kenya and Tanzania).

== Economy ==
There are two major supermarkets, Mulleys (permanently closed) and Eden Mart. There are several petrol stations: Shell, Total, and other independent stations. There is a mosque and several churches as well as hotels and restaurants. construction of fresh produce market is almost finished, this will change livelihood and business as well.

Financial institutions with a foothold in the town include Kenya Commercial Bank, Kenya Women Finance Trust, Sidian Bank, Posta Bank and lately Equity Bank. Emali owes much of its economy to the fact that it sits at a crossroads and straddles an area occupied by two communities practicing different economic activities, the pastoral Maasai and the crop cultivating Kamba. A major commercial activity in Emali Town is the 24-hour trade of fruits, vegetables and assorted cash crops e.g potatoes, watermelons, onions, sweet potatoes, tomatoes, butter nuts, pumpkins etc as you drive along the major Nairobi- Mombasa highway. As a result, other establishments that support these activities have deveoed, including restaurants and rental apartments.

== Challenges ==
Despite being located at a highway, the villages surrounding Emali town lacks access to power and clean water, road access to villages serving matiliku town are only passable during the dry season, power distribution network is tedious.
