= Mutula Kilonzo =

Kenyan lawyer and politician (born 1948)

The Honourable Mutula Kilonzo SC EBS, EGH
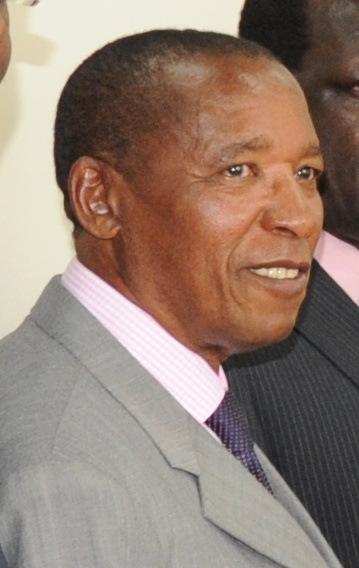

Member of the Kenyan Senate
- In office 28 March 2013 – 27 April 2013
- Succeeded by: Mutula Kilonzo Jr
- Constituency: Makueni County

Minister for Education
- In office 28 March 2012 – 2013
- President: Mwai Kibaki

Minister for Justice, National Cohesion and Constitutional Affairs
- In office May 2009 – 27 March 2012
- President: Mwai Kibaki

Member of the Kenyan Parliament
- In office 2008–2013
- Constituency: Mbooni

Personal details
- Born: 2 July 1948 Mbooni, Kenya
- Died: 27 April 2013 (aged 64)
- Party: WDM-K
- Children: Kethi Kilonzo (Advocate), Mutula Kilonzo Jr . (Advocate)
- Education: UDSM (LLB); Kenya School of Law
- Profession: Lawyer

Mutula Kilonzo (2 July 1948 – 27 April 2013) was a Kenyan politician and Senior Counsel, who served as Minister of Education after having previously served as Minister for Nairobi Metropolitan and justice and constitutional affairs He belonged to the Orange Democratic Movement-Kenya (now Wiper Democratic Movement) and was elected to represent Makueni County as Senator in the 2013 general elections.

== Early life and education ==
Kilonzo was born 2 July 1948 to Wilson Kilonzo Musembi and Mama Rhoda Koki Kilonzo. He was the second born. The young boy had to repeat class one for lack of fifteen shillings in school fees.

Kilonzo was educated at Mbooni Primary School and Machakos School before joining University of Dar es Salaam in 1969, graduating with a First Class Honours Degree in Law – the first in the East African region.

== Political career ==
In the National Assembly of Kenya in the December 2007 parliamentary election. He was Minister for Nairobi Metropolitan Development until being appointed as Minister of Justice and constitutional affairs on 4 May 2009. He was the minister of education until April 2013 when the newly elected president was sworn in. He is on record for having controversially pushed for school girls not to be forced to wear "nun-like" skirts.

He won Makueni senatorial race in 2013 by defeating John Harun Mwau.

Candidate	Party	Vote
Kiki Mulwa	NARC	2,668
Harun MWau	PICK	51,162
Mutula Kilonzo	WIper	193,539
Muthoka Katumo	Independent	2,459
Rejected		1,544
Vote Cast		251,363

== Legal career ==
He previously served as private attorney to the late President Moi. Mutula Kilonzo made his debut in parliament as a nominated M.P for K.A.N.U in January 2003. When the first round of the presidential election took place on 4 March 2013. Uhuru Kenyatta was declared the president-elect of Kenya by the Independent Electoral and Boundaries Commission. Raila Odinga challenged this in the Supreme Court of Kenya. He was one of the many lawyer assembled by Raila Odinga to draft and offer legal services on the petition. The petition was dismissed on 30 March 2013.

== Personal life ==
Mr Kilonzo divorced his first wife – the mother of Wanza and lawyers Kethi Kilonzo, Mutula Kilonzo Jnr and Michael Musembi a businessman – in a landmark divorce which he was represented by Samuel Kivuitu. He married his second wife Nduku Musau, a daughter of the late Machakos mega-tycoon Musau Mwania, with whom they had three children; Muathi Kilonzo a financial expert, Mutune and Musau.

His first wife lives in Nairobi Riara Estate.

On 8 May 2013, a Eunice Nthenya was granted court order to conduct a DNA test to prove that Kilonzo fathered her a son Jackson Muuo who was born on 5 May 2006. she claimed that they had a relationship between 2005 and 2008. She is a daughter to Kilonzo herdsman Robert Kavita Malinda.

== Death ==
Kilonzo died at his farm bordering Maanzoni lodge on Mombasa road Machakos County on 27 April 2013.

Investigations into Senator Mutula Kilonzo's death have ruled out a heart attack and have narrowed down to a likelihood of poisoning. Massive internal bleeding and a finding that all his internal organs were intact was a pointer to the presence of a toxin. An examination of the body had revealed that both the arteries and the heart had not been ruptured as is normally the case when one suffers a heart attack, the source said.

The postmortem examination was conducted by seven doctors, led by the chief government pathologist, Dr Johansen Oduor and his colleague Dr Dorothy Njeru at the Lee Funeral Home in Nairobi. British pathologist Calder Ian Maddison flew to Kenya at the family's request and took part in the examination. The exercise was witnessed by Machokos senator Johnstone Muthama, family doctor Luke Musau and Prof. Emily Rogena. Others were Dr Frederick Okinyi government pathologist of Machakos where he died, and family forensic pathologist Andrew Kanyi Gachie.

He was buried on 9 May at his home in Woyani village, Utangwa location, Makueni County in line with his wishes. A requiem mass was held on 8 May at the Nairobi Baptist Church.

== Legacy ==
Mwaki Foundation which he said he founded in 2007 for his philanthropic efforts.
