= Makueni Constituency =

Kenyan electoral constituency

Makueni
- constituency for the Parliament of Kenya
- Makueni Constituency within Makueni County

- Makueni County within Kenya
- County: Makueni
- Population: 130,375
- Area: 609 km^{2} (235.1 sq mi)

Current constituency
- Number of members: 1
- Party: Wiper
- Member of Parliament: Suzanne Ndunge Kiamba
- Wards: 7

Makueni Constituency is an electoral constituency in Kenya. It is one of six constituencies in Makueni County. The constituency was established for the 1966 elections. Its current MP is Suzanne Ndunge Kiamba of Wiper party.

== Members of Parliament ==
Elections	MP	Party	Notes
1966	Julius Kyengo Ndile	KANU	
1969	Jackson Kasanga Mulwa	KANU	One-party system
1974	Jackson Kasanga Mulwa	KANU	One-party system
1979	Jackson Kasanga Mulwa	KANU	One-party system
1983	Paul Mulwa Sumbi	KANU	One-party system.
1988	Stephen Kyonda	KANU	One-party system.
1992	Peter E. N. Maundu	KANU	
1997	Paul Mulwa Sumbi	SDP	Sumbi died in 1998
1998	Peter E. N. Maundu	KANU	By-election
2002	Kivutha Kibwana	NARC	
2007	Peter Kiilu	ODM-Kenya	Kiilu died in 2020
2013	Daniel K Maanzo	WDM-K	
2017	Daniel K Maanzo	WDM-K	
2022	Suzanne Ndunge Kiamba	WDM-K	

== Wards ==
Makueni Constituency is an electoral constituency number 086. It comprises the following county assembly wards.

- Wote Ward (County Assembly Ward No. 0424 comprises Nziu, Unoa, and Kamunyolo Sub - Locations of Makueni County.
- Muvau/Kikumini Ward (County Assembly Ward No. 0425) comprises Kikumini, Kambimawe, Mumbuni, Muvau, Itaa and Kitonyoni Sub - Locations of Makueni County.
- Mavindini Ward (County Assembly Ward No. 0426) comprises Yekanga, Kanthuni, Ivinganzia, Mavindini, Muusini, Kiunoni and katithi Sub - Locations of Makueni County.
- Kitise/Kithuki Ward (County Assembly Ward No. 0427) comprises Mwania, Kitise, Kimundi, Kithuki and Yinthungu Sub - Locations of Makueni County.
- Kathonzweni Ward (County Assembly Ward No. 0428) comprises Kiangini, Kituluni, Kwa Kavisi, Thavu, Ituka and Kavingoni Sub - Locations of Makueni County.
- Nzaui/Kalamba (County Assembly Ward No. 0429)
- Mbitini (County Assembly Ward No. 0430)
