= Locations of Kenya =

Type of administrative region in Kenya

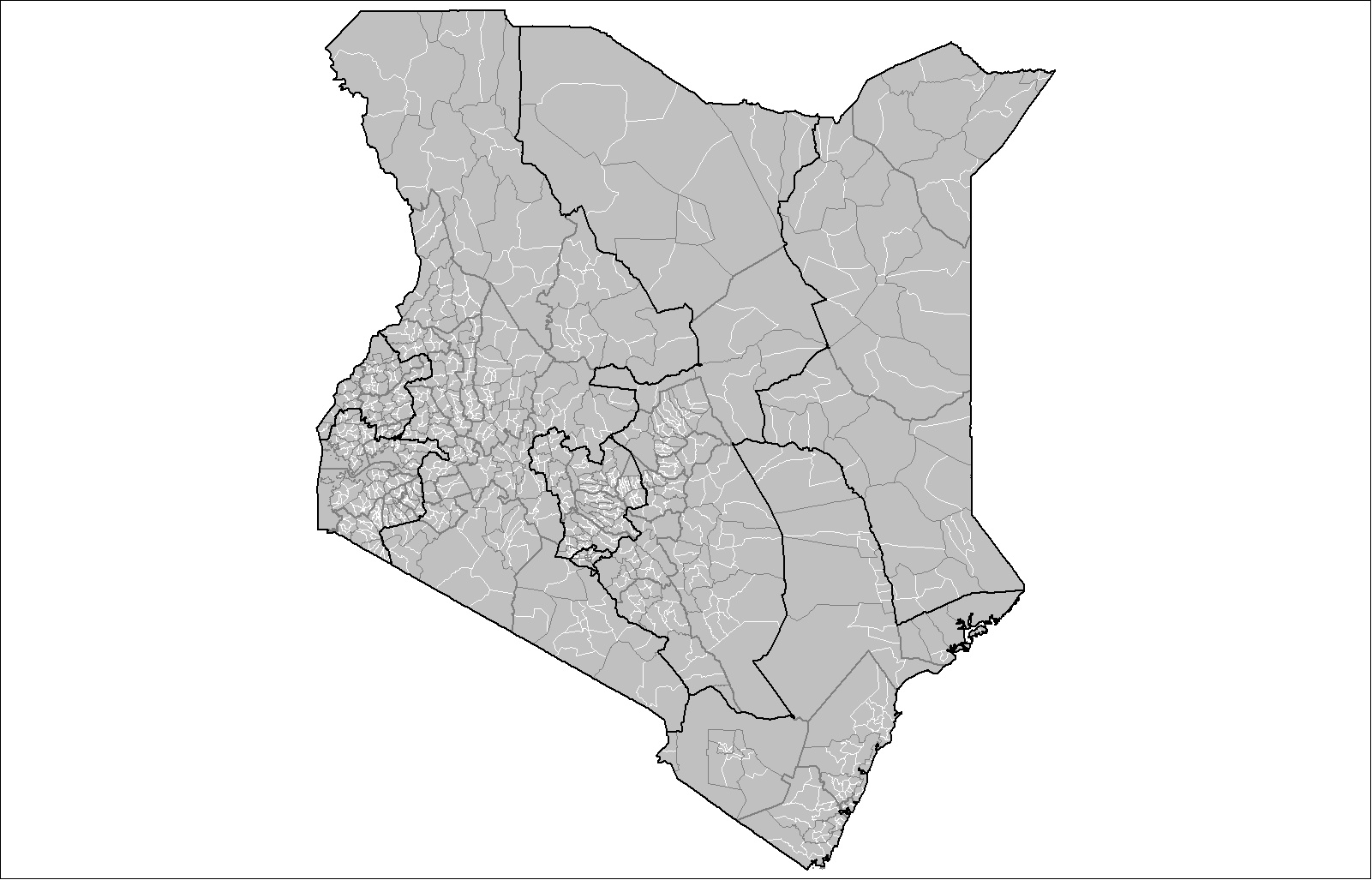
Locations of Kenya

Locations are a type of administrative region in Kenya. Locations are a third level subdivision below counties and sub-counties. Locations are further subdivided into sub-locations. At the 1999 census there were 2,427 locations and 6,612 sublocations in Kenya. Their functions reduced following the 2010 constitution, but still exist under the national government structure.

Each division in Kenya was divided into some locations. Locations often, but not necessarily, coincide with electoral wards. Locations were usually named after their central village or town. Many larger towns consist of several locations.

Each location has a chief, appointed by the state.
