= Makueni County =

- County
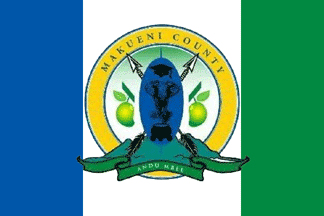
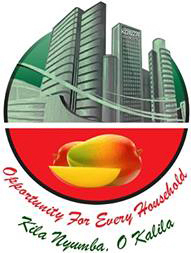
- Flag Coat of arms
- Motto: Haven of Opportunities
- Location of Makueni County in Kenya
- Coordinates: 1°48′S 37°37′E
- Country: Kenya
- Formed: 4 March 2013
- Other towns: Makindu, Emali, Sultan Hamud, Mtito Andei, Kibwezi, Konza

Government
  - Governor: Mutula Kilonzo Junior

Area
  - Total: 8,008.9 km^{2} (3,092.3 sq mi)

Population (2019)
  - Total: 987,653
  - Density: 123.32/km^{2} (319.40/sq mi)
- Time zone: UTC+3 (EAT)
- Website: makueni.go.ke

Makueni County is a county in the former Eastern Province of Kenya. Its capital town is Wote. It's the largest town in the county. Emali town which is an important market and stop over for the Standard Gauge Railway (SGR), is another major town in the county. It is multicultural and adds diversity to Makueni County. The county had a population of 987,653 in the 2019 census. The county lies between Latitude 1° 35' and 2° 59' South and Longitude 37° 10' and 38° 30' East. It borders Machakos County to the North, Kitui County to the East, Taita Taveta County to the South and Kajiado County to the West and covers an area of 8,008.9 km^{2}.

== Physical and topical features ==
The county has a number of prominent features in including volcanic Chyullu hills which lie along the South West border of the county Mbooni hills in Mbooni sub county and Kilungu and Iuani hills in Kaiti sub county, Makongo forest and scenic view, Makuli forest and Nzaui hill.

== Climatic conditions ==
The county experience semi-arid climatic conditions with an average temperature range between 15C – 26C and Annual rainfall ranges between 250mm to 400mm per annum on the lower regions of the county and the higher region receives rainfall ranging from 800mm to 900mm.

== Demographics ==
The county has a total population of 987,653 of which 497,942 females and 20 intersex persons. There are 77,495 household with an average household size of 5.8 persons per household and a population density 6 people per square kilometre.

== Religion ==
Religion in Makueni County

Religion (2019 Census)	Number
Catholicism	292,056
Protestant	479,698
Evangelical Churches	131,964
African instituted Churches	36,575
Orthodox	981
Other Christian	13,030
Islam	6,559
Hindu	57
Traditionists	892
Other	4,807
No Religion Atheists	8,817
Don't Know	1,478
Not Stated	101

== Administrative and political units ==
=== Administrative units ===
There are 6 sub counties, 16 divisions, 63 locations and 127 sub-locations.

==== Sub-counties ====
- Makueni
- Kilome
- Kibwezi East
- Kibwezi West (Makindu)
- Kathonzweni
- Mbooni west
- Mbooni East

==== Political units ====
It has 6 constituencies and 30 county assembly wards and 60 sub-wards.

- Makueni constituency
- Mbooni constituency
- Kibwezi East constituency
- Kibwezi West constituency
- Kaiti constituency
- Kilome constituency

=== Political leadership ===
Kivutha Kibwana is the first and former Governor after being elected in 2013 and 2017 general elections. Mutula Kilonzo Jnr is the current Governor and has been senator since 2013. Rose Museo Mumo is the first elected women representative and was re-elected in 2017 general elections.

For Makueni County, the County Executive Committee comprises:-

County Executive Committee
	Number
The Governor	1
The Deputy Governor	1
The County Secretary	1
The CEC Members	10
Total	13

==== Members of parliament in Makueni County 2017–2022 ====
1. Hon. Jessica Nduku Kiko Mbalu of Wiper democratic Movement Kenya Member of Parliament Kibwezi East Constituency.
2. Hon.Patrick Musimba as Independent Candidate Member of Parliament Kibwezi West Constituency.
3. Hon.Daniel Kitonga Maanzo of Wiper democratic Movement Kenya Member of Parliament Makueni Constituency.
4. Hon.Kimilu, Joshua Kivinda of Wiper democratic Movement Kenya Member of Parliament Kaiti Constituency.
5. Hon.Nzambia, Thuddeus Kithua of Wiper democratic Movement Kenya Member of Parliament Kilome Constituency.
6. Hon. Erastus Kivasu Nzyoka of Wiper democratic Movement KenyaMember of Parliament Mbooni Constituency.

== Education ==
There are 78 ECD centres 997 primary schools and 375 secondary schools. The county has also 3 teachers training colleges, 37 Youth Polytechnics, 231 adult training institutions, 2 technical training institutions, 3 university campuses.

== Health ==
There is a total of 156 health facilities, 726 hospital beds and 1261 cots in the county. County has 815 health personnel of different cadre.

HIV prevalence rate is 5.1% in 2017.

== Transport and Communication ==
There is one air strip and 8 railway lines with total coverage of 140 km. The county is covered by 7670 km of road network. Of this 6,776 km is covered by earth surface, 706 km is murram surface and 188 km of surface is covered by Bitumen.

There are twenty post office with 4,850 installed letter boxes, 3,302 rented letter boxes, 1,548 vacant letter boxes and 31 licences stamp vendors.

== Trade and Commerce ==
There are 420 trading centres, 17,390 registered businesses, 153 banking services (including agents & insurance, 882 mobile service providers and 382 agro-vets, chemists& pharmacies.

== Universities and colleges in Makueni County ==
- South Eastern Kenya University (SEKU) wote campus – The campus is located at Soi Plaza building, 2nd floor, above Equity Bank in Wote Town, the headquarters of Makueni County, and about 140 km from Kitui main campus. The campus began its operations in March, 2012. Currently, the campus has a student population of 315 who are taking classes in different regular, part-time and institutional-based programmes.
- Wote Technical Training Institute
- Kenya Medical Training College KMTC Makueni Campus.
- Kenya Medical Training College KMTC Makindu Campus.
- Kenya Medical Training College KMTC Mbuvo Campus.

== Constituencies ==
Since 2010, county has six constituencies:

- Mbooni Constituency
- Kilome Constituency
- Kaiti Constituency
- Makueni Constituency
- Kibwezi West Constituency
- Kibwezi East Constituency

== Other Divisions ==
Local authorities (councils)
Authority	Type	Population*	Urban pop.*
Wote	Town	56,419	5,542
Mtito Andei	Town	24,435	4,304
Makueni	County	690,691	18,689
Total	-	771,545	28,535
* 1999 census. Source:

Administrative divisions
Division	Population*	Urban pop.*	Headquarters
Kaiti	46,107	501	Kilala
Kalawa	14,039	0	Kalawa
Kasikeu	35,719	1,848	Kasikeu
Kathonzweni	65,738	0	Kathonzweni
Kibwezi	80,236	4,695	Kibwezi
Kilome	46,204	0	Mukaa
Kilungu	67,741	0	Mukaa
Kisau	50,510	1,905	
Makindu	50,299	2,482	Makindu
Matiliku	38,867	0	Matiliku
Mbitini	48,729	3,266	Emali
Mbooni	55,984	1,786	Mbooni
Mtito Andei	66,663	3,966	Mtito Andei
Ilima	32,717	0	
Wote	40,353	4,708	Wote
Total	771,545	25,157	-
* 1999 census. Sources:

== South Eastern Kenya Region ==
=== Urbanisation ===
Urbanisation in South Eastern Kenya
County	Urbanisation in South Eastern Kenya (Per cent)
Machakos County	52
Kitui County	13.8
Makueni County	11.8
Kenya Average	32.3
Urbanisation by County in South Eastern Kenya

Source: OpenDataKenya

=== Wealth/Poverty Level ===
Wealth/Poverty Level in South Eastern Kenya
County	Poverty Level in South Eastern Kenya (Per cent)
Machakos County	59.6
Kitui County	63.1
Makueni County	64.1
Kenya Average	45.9
Poverty level by County

Source: OpenDataKenya Worldbank

== Villages and settlements ==
- Astra Farm
- Emali
- Kandolo
- Kikima
- Nunguni
- Mbeetwani

== Notable people ==
- Mutula Kilonzo - former Minister of Justice and Constitutional Affairs
- Jeremiah Kianga - former Chief of General Staff of the Kenya Defence Forces
- Philip Waki - retired Judge and head of the 2008 Commission of Inquiry into Post-Election Violence
- Philomena Mwilu - Deputy Chief Justice of the Supreme Court of Kenya
- Joseph Musyimi Lele Ndolo - first African Chief of General Staff of the Kenya Defence Forces
- Winfred Yavi - 3000 metres steeplechase winner in the 2023 World Athletics Championships and 2024 Olympics Champion
- Kivutha Kibwana - former Governor of Makueni County
- Kamoya Kimeu - Paleontologist and Curator
- Teresia Mbaika Malokwe - Environmentalist and Health Economist
- Peter Kiilu - former Member of Parliament for Makueni Constituency
- Nduku Kilonzo - former Executive Director of National Aids Control Council of Kenya
- Nick Mwendwa - President of Football Kenya Federation
- Gideon Ndambuki - Kenyan politician
- Joseph K. Munyao - former Minister of Livestock and Fisheries

== See also ==
- Kitui County
- Machakos County
- Taita Taveta County
- Kajiado County
