= Eastern Province (Kenya) =

Province of Kenya

Eastern Province Mkoa wa Mashariki
- Former Province
- Location of the Former Province in Kenya.
- Coordinates: 0°0′N 38°0′E
- Country: Kenya
- No. of Counties: 8
- Capital: Embu

Area
  - Total: 140,698.6 km^{2} (54,324.0 sq mi)

Population (2009)
  - Total: 5,668,123
  - Density: 40.28557/km^{2} (104.3391/sq mi)
- Time zone: UTC+3 (EAT)

Mount Kenya was found in the former Eastern Province (capital Embu; click map to enlarge)

The Eastern Province (Swahili: Mkoa wa Mashariki) of Kenya was one of 8 Provinces of Kenya. Its northern boundary ran along with that of Ethiopia; the North Eastern Province and Coast Province lay to the east and south; and the remainder of Kenya's provinces, including Central Province, ran along its western border, and Rift Valley lay to the north west and south west. The provincial capital was Embu.

== Overview ==
On 16 July 2009, the province was sub-divided into three: Lower Eastern with Machakos as headquarters, Central Eastern with Embu as headquarters, and Upper Eastern with Marsabit as headquarters; however, those changes never took effect due to the political wrangles in the Kenyan coalition government at the time. The sub-division of provinces was carried out in seven provinces of Kenya, excluding Nairobi. As of March 2013 after the Kenyan general election, 2013, the Eastern Province was subdivided into eight counties, namely:

Code	County	Area (km^{2})	Population census 2009	Capital
10	Marsabit	66,923.1	291,166	Marsabit
11	Isiolo	25,336.1	143,294	Isiolo
12	Meru	7,003	1,356,301	Meru
13	Tharaka-Nithi	2,609.5	365,330	Chuka
14	Embu	2,555.9	516,212	Embu
15	Kitui	24,385.1	1,012,709	Kitui
16	Machakos	5,952.9	1,098,584	Machakos
17	Makueni	8,008.9	884,527	Wote
	Totals	140,698.6	5,668,123	-

The province was principally inhabited by the Meru, Kamba, Embu, and several pastoralist communities. In 1979, its population was 2.7 million; in 1999, 4,631,779 (according to the 1999 census) and in 2009 the province would have had a population of 5,668,123. In terms of area, it was the second largest province at (140,698.6 km^{2}) in Kenya.

== Geography ==
Eastern Province of Kenya includes the Chalbi Desert, Mount Kenya, and the eastern half of Lake Turkana. The climate in the region is arid to semi-arid. Its most important permanent river is Ewaso Ng'iro.

== Villages and settlements ==
- Beacon Ranch
- Chematu
- Chiakariga
- Chiananda
- Chomboni
- Ekarakara
- El Dera
- Embori Farm
- Gakwegore
- Goriva
- Gatundori
- Gatunga
- Gekuuri
- Gethemu
- Gitare
- Ianzoni
- Igumori
- Iiuni
- Ikarakara
- Ikoo
- Imale
- Inghi Farm
- Inyokoni
- Isuvya
- Itetani
- Ithemboni
- Ithoku
- Itugururu
- Janoni
- Kaathene
- Kakunike
- Kakunio
- Kailembwa
- Kairuri
- Kakalia
- Kakangani
- Kalimbui
- Kalulini
- Kamaende
- Kampi-Ya-Chumvi
- Kambi ya Munyu
- Kampi Ya Juu
- Kamuthwa
- Kaningo
- Kanjuki
- Kanyekine
- Karingare
- Karuamgi
- Karuari
- Karwiro
- Kasafari
- Kasaini
- Kasilia
- Kasiokoni
- Katelembu
- Katene
- Kathangarari
- Kathangari
- Katheka
- Kathenaugi
- Kathugu
- Kathungu
- Katothia
- Katulye
- Kavururi
- Kavyongo
- Kawanjaro
- Kawelu
- Kegaa
- Kenplains
- Kerie
- Kevanda
- Kevote
- Kiamuringa
- Kiangungi
- Kianiai
- Kianiokoma
- Kianjuki
- Kiatineni
- Kibogi
- Kibugwa
- Kijegge
- Kikuu
- Kilawa
- Kimuu
- Kinyata Grazing Area
- Kirimari
- Kiritiri
- Kitandi
- Kithangathini
- Kitheine
- Kithunguri
- Kitoo
- Kitute
- Kivumbu
- Komboyoo
- Kyuso
- Kwakavisi
- Kwandeke
- Kwa Kitau
- Kwa Makuli
- Kwa Ukungu
- Log Logo
- Lolomarik Farm
- Mado Yaka
- Maikuu
- Maiyuni
- Makabete
- Makengi
- Makinya
- Malibani
- Malima
- Malka Mari
- Mandongoi
- Mangelete
- Manoni
- Mapepie
- Masimbani
- Masongoleni
- Mavindu
- Mbevoni
- Mbuvu
- Mitembuka
- Mitungugu
- Mkapuwanzee
- Mubuko
- Muchiene
- Muchumo
- Mulala
- Muringari
- Mushamba
- Musikio
- Mutulia
- Mutune
- Mwangareme
- Mwangini
- Mwambathana
- Mwe
- Mwewe
- Ndooa
- Nembure
- Nchimwani
- Ngandani
- Ngandure
- Ngarira
- Ngathune
- Ngiori
- Ngosini East
- Ngosini West
- Ngovie
- Ngusishi
- Nguu
- Nguuni
- Ngwate
- Saricho
- Skwata
- Syumbungu
- Usueni

== See also ==
- Makueni County
- Marsabit County
- Meru County
- Tharaka-Nithi County
- Kitui County
- Isiolo County
- Machakos County
