= Kitui Rural Constituency =

Kitui Rural Constituency is an electoral constituency in Kenya. It is one of eight constituencies in Kitui County. The constituency was established and gazetted in 2012 by the IEBC in readiness for the 2013 elections.

== Members of Parliament ==
Elections	MP	Party	Notes
2013	Charles Mutisya Nyamai	Wiper	Multiparty system - under new constitution.
2017	David Mwalika Mboni	CCU	Multiparty system - under new constitution.

== Wards ==
Wards
Ward	Registered Voters
Kisasi	12, 284
Mbitini	10, 624
Kwa Vonza / Yatta	16, 620
Kanyangi	10, 086
Total	49, 614
*August 2017.

== See also ==
- Kitui West Constituency
- Kitui South Constituency
- Kitui Central Constituency
- Kitui East Constituency
- Mwingi North Constituency
- Mwingi Central Constituency
- Mwingi West Constituency
