= Charity Ngilu =

Kenyan politician

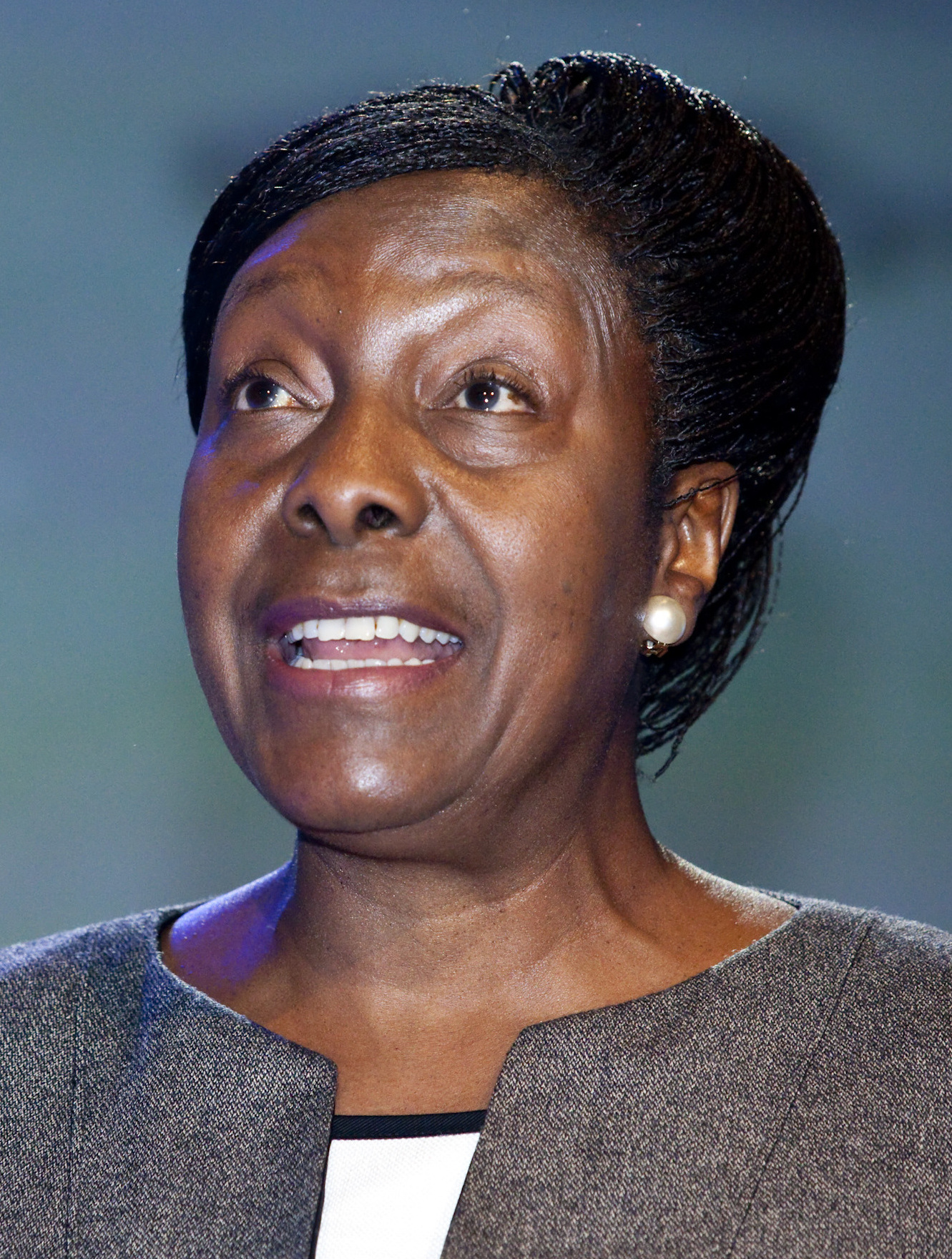

2nd County Governor of Kitui
- In office 22 August 2017 – 25 August 2022
- Deputy: Wathe Nzau
- Preceded by: Julius Malombe
- Succeeded by: Julius Malombe

Cabinet Secretary for Land, Housing and Urban Development
- In office 15 May 2013 – 29 March 2015
- President: Uhuru Kenyatta
- Preceded by: James Orengo
- Succeeded by: Fred Matiang'i (acting)

Minister of Water and Irrigation
- In office 17 April 2008 – 2013
- President: Mwai Kibaki
- Prime Minister: Raila Odinga
- Preceded by: Mutua Mutuku
- Succeeded by: Judy Wakhungu

Minister of Health
- In office 3 January 2003 – 6 October 2007
- President: Mwai Kibaki

Member of Parliament for Kitui Central
- In office 26 January 1993 – 28 March 2013
- Preceded by: George Ndotto
- Succeeded by: Makali Mulu

Personal details
- Born: 28 January 1952 (age 74) Machakos, Kenya Colony
- Party: NARC, Social Democratic Party
- Children: 3
- Education: St. Paul's University (BA)
- Website: www.mamangilu.co.ke

Charity Kaluki Ngilu (born 28 January 1952) is a Kenyan politician and the second governor elected for Kitui County. She unsuccessfully vied to be President of the Republic of Kenya in 1997. She served as Minister for Health from 2003 until 2007 and Minister of Water and Irrigation from April 2008 to 2013. She also served as Cabinet Secretary for Land, Housing and Urban Development from 2013 until 2015.

Charity Ngilu attended Alliance Girls High School, then joined Government Secretarial College, Kianda College, and the Kenya Institute of Administration for Commerce to receive management and secretarial skills. She started as a secretary before becoming a prosperous businesswoman in the plastics and bakery industries.

Along with Joyce Laboso and Anne Waiguru, Ngilu is one of three women who became Kenya's first female governors in 2017.

== Political life ==
Ngilu was elected to represent the Kitui central constituency seat in 1992 on a Democratic Party ticket. She was reelected to the same seat and ran for president in the 1997 general election on a Social Democratic Party of Kenya ticket, finishing fifth behind the eventual winner, Daniel arap Moi. Along with Wangari Maathai, she became Kenya's first female presidential candidate Kenya.

Later, she joined National Party of Kenya. In the December 2002 general election, her party was part of the National Rainbow Coalition (NARC). The coalition went on to win the elections, and President Mwai Kibaki appointed her as Minister of Health when he named his Cabinet on 3 January 2003. She was also appointed NARC chairperson.

Ngilu was seen as a new school member in the government, as opposed to old school members like John Michuki and President Kibaki. However, she was left stranded after the Liberal Democratic Party left the coalition after the defeat of the Government-sponsored draft constitution, while most of the remaining NARC members founded the new Narc-Kenya party led by Martha Karua.

On 5 October 2007, Ngilu announced her support for the Orange Democratic Movement and its presidential candidate, Raila Odinga, in the December 2007 general election; she has compared Odinga to Nelson Mandela. She initially said that she was remaining in the government, despite backing Kibaki's main rival. However, her dismissal from the government by Kibaki was announced on 6 October.

Ngilu was re-elected to her seat from Kitui Central in the December 2007 parliamentary election. Kibaki won the presidential election according to official results, but this was disputed by the ODM, and a violent crisis developed. The crisis was eventually resolved with a power-sharing agreement, and in the grand coalition Cabinet named on 13 April 2008 and sworn in on 17 April, Ngilu was appointed as Minister of Water and Irrigation.

Ngilu showed support for Raila Odinga in running for presidential bid in Kenyan elections 2013.She later launched a presidential bid through her Narc Political Party, ultimately choosing to run for Kitui County senator and losing to David Musila in the process.

Following her failed bid, Ngilu was named Cabinet Secretary for Land, Housing and Urban Development by president Uhuru Kenyatta, but she resigned from the post following corruption allegations.

=== Kitui County Governor ===
Ngilu ran for governor of Kitui County in the 2017 general election, beating incumbent Julius Malombe and becoming one of three elected women governors.

==== Directives on Environmental Protection ====
Charity Ngilu's tenure as Kitui County Governor began with controversial and otherwise popular decisions including banning sand harvesting and the burning and transportation of charcoal in the county. The directive according to Ngilu was in the interest of environment protection in the county. The ban on charcoal transportation brought about allegations of ethnic incitement. This resulted in the summoning and questioning of Ngilu by the National Cohesion and Integration Commission. Kiambu County Governor Ferdinand Waititu proceeded to sue Charity Ngilu for incitement. Ngilu's move attracted defence from leaders in the lower eastern region of Kenya, also known as Ukambani. Ngilu secured a court order barring the police from arresting her over the charcoal row. Implementation of the charcoal transportation ban was problematic with allegations that Kitui County government officials were colluding with charcoal transporters to undermine Ngilu's directive. The problem also attracted public opinion on how best to effect the ban.

==== Relationship with County Assembly ====
In the first two years of her tenure as Governor, Charity had a strained relationship with members of the Kitui County Assembly. In December 2018, Charity was accused of delaying the release of salaries to members of the County Assembly. Charity and members of the assembly were reported to develop an improving working relationship in 2019. Charity accused the assembly of unduly delaying the passing of a supplementary budget until May 2020 with one month remaining to the end of the financial year.

==== Troubled County Public Service Board Appointments ====
In the first half of 2020, her nominees to the County Public Service Board (CPSB) were rejected by the County Assembly. The term of the county's first Public Service Board had expired in 2019. The rejection arose after what Charity Ngilu considered an unjustified delay that she blamed on the Assembly Speaker Mr. George Ndoto. Charity went on to blame the rejection of her nominees on what she considered interference in local politics by Kalonzo Musyoka, the Wiper Democratic Party leader.

The delayed appointment of members of the County Public Service Board was reported to hinder the hiring of extra healthcare workers to enhance the county's fight against the COVID-19 pandemic.

== 2022 General Elections ==
In the 2022 elections, Ngilu supported Raila Odinga's bid for presidency. Though she had been cleared by the Independent Electoral and Boundaries Commission (IEBC) to defend her seat as governor of Kitui County, she would later withdraw her candidature in favor of Julius Malombe of Wiper Party. She was allegedly angling for a higher position in Raila Odinga's led Azimio la Umoja – One Kenya coalition government if the coalition would win the August polls.

== Law Society of Kenya Blacklist ==
On 16 January 2012 the Law Society of Kenya identified Ngilu as one of the public officials have been mentioned adversely in various reports on issues ranging from corruption to economic crimes. The society advised voters not to vote those mentioned in the report as they had previously compromised.

== Censure motion 2013 ==
In November 2013, the 11th Kenyan parliament debated about her conduct as the cabinet secretary for Land, Housing and Urban Development. The parliament was acting on recommendations by a special committee whose mandate was to investigate how she appointed a new director-general at her ministry without involving the parliament as provided for in the constitution of Kenya.

== Personal life ==
Her husband, Michael Mwendwa Ngilu, died on 1 July 2006 in South Africa. Charity Ngilu has three children.

== Public remarks on 2007 post-election crisis ==
In July 2025, Charity Ngilu revealed that the Orange Democratic Movement’s “Pentagon” leadership team, of which she was a member, had been prepared to swear in Raila Odinga as President of Kenya following the disputed 2007 general election. Ngilu explained that Odinga ultimately declined to take the oath, saying that doing so could have plunged the country into deeper chaos and bloodshed. She made the remarks during a televised political discussion on the lessons learned from Kenya’s past election crises. Her comments were widely covered in local media and reignited debate over the events surrounding the 2007–2008 post-election violence.

== Controversy over tax dispute revelation ==
In October 2025, Ngilu faced public criticism after she disclosed that she had personally reached out to opposition leader Raila Odinga before his death, asking him to intervene in a long-running tax dispute between her and the Kenya Revenue Authority (KRA). The revelation came during a local radio interview, where she expressed regret that the issue remained unresolved. The remarks drew backlash online, with commentators accusing her of attempting to use political influence to settle personal financial matters. Supporters, however, defended her as being candid about the challenges faced by former public officials.
