= Kitui School =

School in Kenya

Coordinates: 1.372775°S 38.003891°E

Kitui High School is a boys' boarding secondary school in Kitui County and the only national boys' secondary school in the county. It has a population of 1,500 students. It is located about 2 kilometers from Kitui town along the Kitui-Mbusyani road.

== History ==
Kitui School began as an intermediate school in 1908 before changing to a boarding school in 1948. The school was by that time known as Campbell Academy. It started offering A-level classes in 1971.

== Notable alumni and academicians ==
- Willy Mutunga, Retired Chief Justice of Kenya
- Kalonzo Musyoka, 10th Vice-President of Kenya
- Makau Mutua, Former Dean of the University of Buffalo Law School
- Ngala Mwendwa, A member of the Kenyan delegation to the 1960 Lancaster House Conference
- Muthomi Njuki, Governor Tharaka Nithi County and former Chuka-Igambang'ombe MP (taught Biology and coached rugby)
- Benjamin Nzimbi, Retired Archbishop and Primate of the Anglican Church of Kenya
