= Muthale Girls' High School =

School in Kenya

Muthale Girls' High School is a girls' boarding secondary school in Kitui County. It is the only other national school {after Kitui School and St Charles Lwanga school (recently)} in the county after it was elevated to national school status in 2011. The school is located along Kitui-Mwingi road in hilly terrain of Mutonguni and borders Muthale Mission Hospital. The school has a population of 1500 students, 64 teachers and 25 subordinate staff. It is one of the best performing schools in Kenya.

== History ==
The school was established by the Franciscan Sisters for Africa in 1970. The Franciscan Sisters had founded Muthale Mission Hospital in 1948. The school started as mixed day school before changing to girls school the same year it was founded.

In 2018, they posted excellent KCSE results. They had the top student in Kitui county (Sharlene Kyambi).
