= Kitui District =

Former district of Kenya

Coordinates: 0°22′S 38°01′E

Kitui District was an administrative district in the Eastern Province of Kenya. Its capital was Kitui. The district had an area of 20,402 km^{2}.

Kitui District was created in 1895 as one of the original districts of Ukamba Province among, Ulu (then named Athi and later Machakos), and Kikuyu districts. The district remained as part of Ukamba Province until 1933, in Central Province until 1953, Southern Province until 1962, and Eastern Province after 1963.

By the 2000s, Kitui District had three more districts created from it; Mutomo, Mwingi and Kyuso, all had a population of 872,742.

In 2010, after the promulgation of the new constitution of Kenya, counties were to be created based on the districts of Kenya that existed prior to 1992. This effectively led to the creation of Kitui County.

== Government ==
The district had two local authorities: Kitui municipality and Kitui county council.

Kitui district was divided into eight administrative divisions: Central (Kitui), Kabati, Chuluni, Mutitu, Mwitika, Mutomo (Ikanga), Ikutha and Yatta.

The district had four constituencies:

- Kitui West Constituency
- Kitui Central Constituency
- Kitui South Constituency
- Mutito Constituency
