= Nzambani Rock =

Rock near Kitui, Kenya

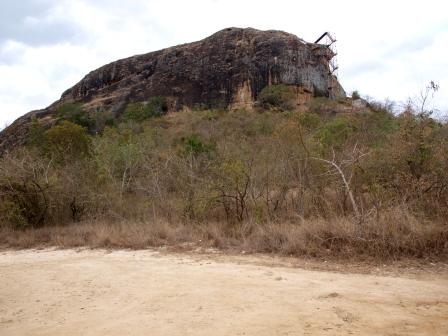
Nzambani Rock, Kenya

Nzambani Rock, locally known as Ivia ya Nzambani, is a stone outcrop standing approximately 600 feet (180 meters) above the ground. The rock is situated about 8 kilometers from Kitui town along the Kitui-Mutitu road at Nzambani market, Kenya. Next to it are St. Peters Nzambani Boys' Secondary School and Nzambani Primary School. The top of the rock offers a cool breeze and views of Kitui County and beyond.

Nzambani Rock is a major tourist attraction in Kitui county. Adult foreigners are charged Kshs 1000 while their children pay Kshs 500. Local adult tourists pay Kshs 300 while children are charged Kshs 150 to climb to the top of the rock. A metallic staircase has been constructed for visitors to climb to the top. The staircase is fenced for the sake of children and other people who are afraid of heights.

Though an overlooked landscape by the locals, the rock is particularly famous for the myths surrounding it, attracting many who come to experience adventure and quench their curiosity about the myths. It is believed that anyone who goes round the rock seven times changes into a member of the opposite sex This tale has been passed from one generation to another but it is clear that no one has ever tried to go round the rock seven times. There are many other tales as to how the rock came into being. Visitors are charged Kshs 200 to be told all the myths surrounding the rock.
