= Mutinda =

Mutinda is a Kenyan surname. Notable people with the surname include:

- Daniel Musyoka Mutinda, member of the National Assembly of Kenya
- David Mutinda Mutua (born 1992), Kenyan middle-distance runner
- Julius Mutinda (born 1956), Kenyan field hockey player
