= Mwingi District =

Coordinates: 0°56′S 38°04′E

Mwingi District was a former district of Kenya, located in the now defunct Eastern Province. The district had a population of 303.828 (1999 census). Its capital was Mwingi town.

Local people are mostly of the Akamba tribe. North of Mwingi town, is the Mwingi National Reserve (formerly Kitui North National Reserve), which borders Meru National Park and Kora National Park.

The district had two electoral constituencies, Mwingi North and Mwingi South. Kalonzo Musyoka, a prominent politician is from Mwingi.

In 2010, due to the promulgation of new constitution the district was merged into Kitui County.

Local authorities (councils)
Authority	Type	Population*	Urban pop.*
Mwingi	Town	67,678	10,138
Mwingi County	County	236,150	462
Total	-	303,828	10,600
* 1999 census. Source:

Administrative divisions
Division	Population*	Urban pop.*	Headquarters
Central	83,687	9,281	Mwingi
Kyuso	34,272	0	
Migwani	56,907	433	Migwani
Muumoni	37,607	0	
Ngomeni	10,712	0	Ngomeni
Nguni	20,415	0	Nguni
Nuu	36,561	0	
Tseikuru	23,667	0	Tseikuru
Total	303,828	9,714	-
* 1999 census. Sources: , ,
