= Mutomo District =

Former district in Eastern Province, Kenya

Mutomo District was a former district in the Eastern Province of Kenya. Its population is 180,000. The administrative center of the district is Mutomo. In 2010, it was merged into Kitui County.

Mutomo district was one of the poorest areas in Kenya. It is without tarmac roads, and lacks electricity or plumbing in homes. The chronic, severe drought affecting all of Kenya has especially affected this area.

== Water situation ==
The climate is semi-arid and rainfall is unpredictable; when it comes it can be heavy, causing flooding and erosion. Lack of clean water is one of the area's primary problems and the population depends on seasonal rainfall. Available water from dams and seasonal rivers, which must be carried by the people in the area to their homes, is often contaminated and green with algae. Contaminated water can result in waterborne diseases such as cholera, typhoid and dysentery. In 2009 there was a cholera outbreak in parts of the district in which seven died, and 1,134 people were diagnosed with the disease. The severe shortage of water and poor sanitation were related to the outbreak, according to authorities, and the capacity of hospitals was strained.

== District projects ==
The Kenya Red Cross Society, Kitui branch, outlined a program in July 2011 to be implemented in two areas of the Mutomo District, Mathima and Kanziku that have badly contaminated water, and lasting until the following April. The program distributed portable water filters called "Lifestraw filters and LifeStaw Family filters" which come in two sizes: one small enough for school children to hang around their necks (since it is the children who carry much of the water), and a larger filter supplied for household use. The small filter lasts three years and the larger one is good for five years. The program aimed to supply 3,750 pupils and 6,750 households. Both the school children and adult residents were excited about their filters. One school pupil, Kambua Mwanzia, said the children had been trained in the use of the filter and that besides cleaning the water it also removed smells. She said she keeps her filter with her at all times, unless she is in bed.

The purpose of the non-profit Mutomo Projects is to improve the lives of the people in the Mutomo District by encouraging community participation, including contributions of labor. Many of its projects are geared toward sustainable development and the creation of microcredit groups for funding.

Ekani is one of the poorest villages in the district and no longer has a dispensary. Although built, it was never operated due to lack of funding. The Ekani Community Development Programme, an NGO, seeks to reduce poverty in Ekani by starting developmental projects in a variety of areas, including water, health care and education.

== See also ==
- Districts of Kenya
