= Mwingi North Constituency =

Kenyan electoral constituency

Mwingi North Constituency is an electoral constituency in Kenya. It is one of eight constituencies in Kitui County. It used to be one of two constituencies in Mwingi District. The constituency was established for the 1997 elections.

The immediate former MP of Mwingi North MP was Kalonzo Musyoka, the former vice-president of Kenya. He had represented the Kitui North Constituency, which was split before the 1997 elections.

== Members of Parliament ==
Elections	MP	Party	Notes						
1997	Kalonzo Musyoka	KANU							
2002	Kalonzo Musyoka	NARC							
2007	Kalonzo Musyoka	ODM-Kenya							
2013	Munuve Mati	WDM-K		2017	Paul Nzengu	WDM-K	2022	Paul Nzengu	WDM-K

== Locations and wards ==
Locations
Location	Population*
Endui	7,774
Kakuyu	21,033
Kamuwongo	7,825
Kanthungu	5,889
Kanzanzu	6,639
Katse	7,516
Kimangao	12,372
Kyuso	11,343
Mitamisyi	5,958
Mivukoni	9,001
Musavani	9,074
Musyungwa	8,279
Mutanda	4,114
Mwingi	37,833
Ngomeni	6,713
Nguni	11,199
Tharaka	5,935
Tseikuru	10,643
Waita	12,898
Total	x
1999 census.

Wards
Ward	Registered Voters	Local Authority
Kakuyu / Mukong'a	5,596	Mwingi County
Kanzanzu	2,492	Mwingi town
Katse / Mutanda / Nguuku	5,205	Mwingi County
Kimangau	4,263	Mwingi County
Kivou / Enziu	3,848	Mwingi town
Kyuso / Kamuw'ongo	6,133	Mwingi County
Masyungwa / Mivukoni	6,285	Mwingi County
Mitamisyi / Ngomeni	4,579	Mwingi County
Mwingi / Ithumbi	3,509	Mwingi town
Nguni	3,688	Mwingi County
Tharaka / Kanthungu	3,351	Mwingi County
Tseikuru / Musavani	6,639	Mwingi County
Waita / Endui	6,784	Mwingi County
Total	62,372	
*September 2005.
