= Mwingi South Constituency =

Kenyan electoral constituency

Mwingi South Constituency was a former electoral constituency in Kenya. It is one of the eight constituencies in the Kitui County and is now known as Mwingi Central.

The constituency was established for the 1997 elections and was one of two constituencies in the former Mwingi District.

== Members of Parliament ==
Elections	MP	Party	Notes
1997	David Musila	KANU	
2002	David Musila	NARC	
2007	David Musila	ODM-Kenya	

In 2011 Musila, who represented the constituency since its establishment in 1997, declared he would run for the Kitui senator seat.

== Locations and wards ==
Locations
Location	Population*
Kalitini	7,689
Kiomo	18,391
Kyome	11,312
Migwani	21,180
Mui	10,544
Mumbuni	15,462
Mutyangome	6,286
Nguutani	19,285
Nuu	9,023
Thitani	15,539
Ukasi	12,951
Wingemi	9,707
Total	x
1999 census.

Wards
Ward	Registered Voters	Local Authority
Katalwa / Nzeluni	4,950	Mwingi town
Kavuvwani	4,441	Mwingi town
Kyethani / Kiomo	6,449	Mwingi town
Kalitini / Mui	7,023	Mwingi county
Kyome	3,912	Mwingi county
Mutyangome	1,954	Mwingi county
Nguutani	6,210	Mwingi county
Nuu	3,203	Mwingi county
Thitani	5,703	Mwingi county
Ukasi	4,678	Mwingi county
Wingemi	3,289	Mwingi county
Total	59,527	
*September 2005.
