= Kitui County =

- County
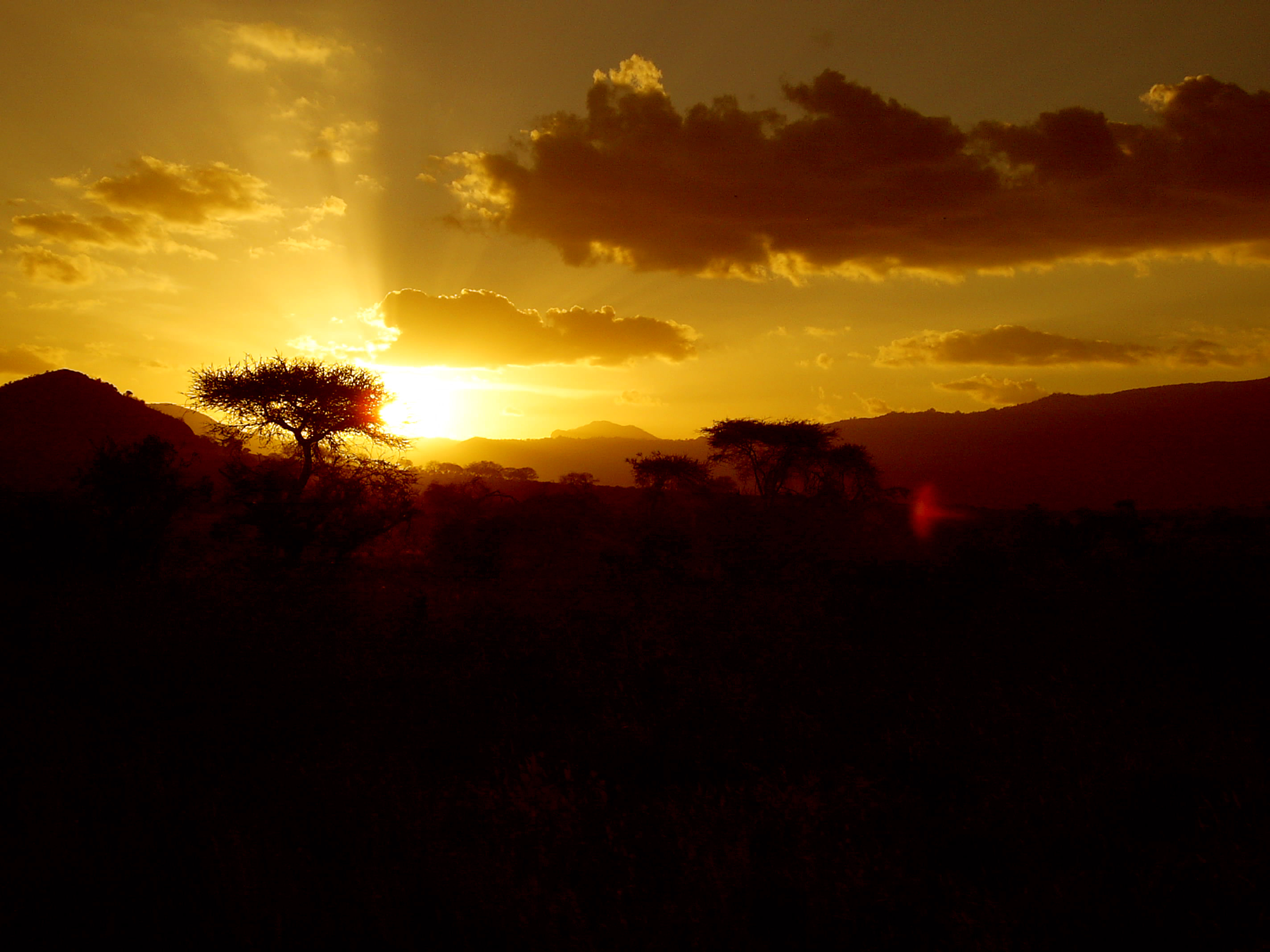
- Sunset at Tsavo East National Park mostly located in Kitui County

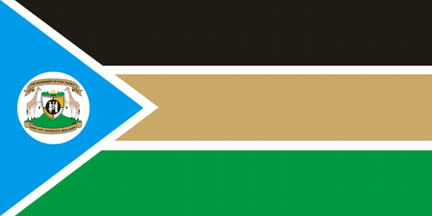
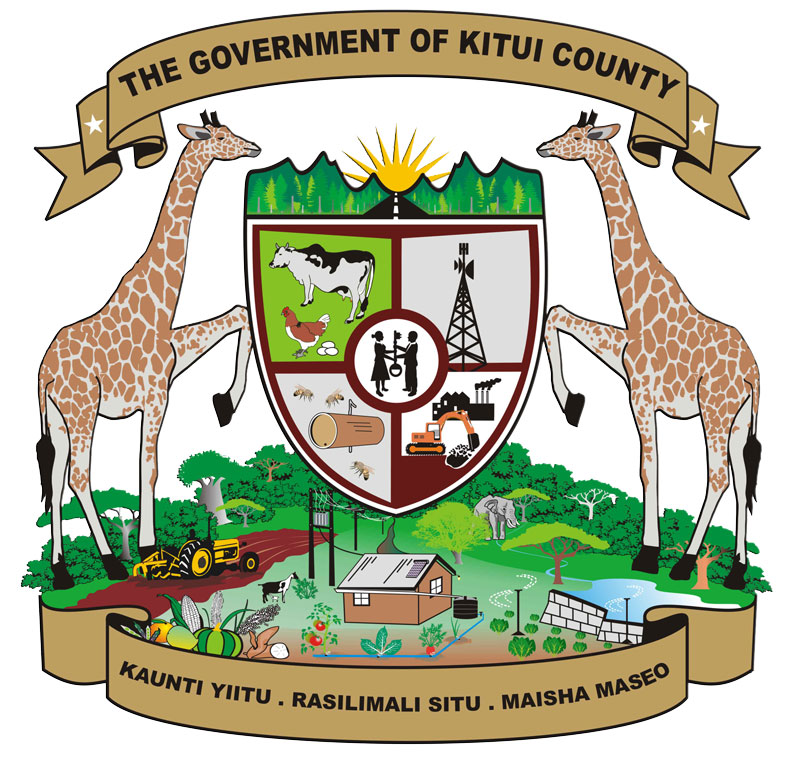
- Flag Coat of arms
- Motto(s): Kaunti Yiitu, Rasilimali Situ, Maisha Maseo (Our County, Our Resources, Good Life)
- Location in Kenya
- Coordinates: 1°29′S 38°23′E
- Country: Kenya
- Formed: 27 August 2010
- Capital: Kitui
- Other towns: Mwingi, Mbitini, Kwa Vonza, Kyuso

Government
  - Governor: Julius Malombe
  - Deputy Governor of Kitui: Kanani Augustine Wambua
  - Senator: Enoch Kiio Wambua
  - Woman Representative: Kasalu Irene Muthoni

Area
  - Total: 30,430 km^{2} (11,750 sq mi)
  - Water: 24,194 km^{2} (9,341 sq mi)

Population (2019)
  - Total: 1,136,187
  - Density: 37.34/km^{2} (96.70/sq mi)
- Time zone: UTC+3 (EAT)
- Website: Official website

Kitui County is one of the 47 counties of Kenya in the former Eastern Province of Kenya. Its capital and largest town is Kitui. Mwingi is also another major urban centre. The county has a population of about 1.2 million people (as of 2024) and an area of 30,496 km^{2}. It lies between latitudes 0°10 South and 3°0 South and longitudes 37°50 East and 39°0 East.

Kitui County shares its borders with seven counties; Tharaka-Nithi and Meru to the north, Embu to the northwest, Machakos and Makueni to the west, Tana River to the east and southeast, and Taita-Taveta to the south.

Kitui County is "representative" of the fragile Arid and Semi-arid lands of Kenya that account for 80 percent of the land mass. These lands are characterized by high poverty levels, agro-pastoral livelihoods, high vulnerability to climate shocks, underdeveloped social infrastructure, low access to social services, and in extreme cases conflict over natural resources, especially during droughts".

== History ==
The name Kitui means 'a place where iron goods are made'. The Kamba iron-smiths who settled in the county many years before the colonial period are the ones who named the area Kitui.

== Demographics ==
Kitui County has a total population of 1.2 million people (as of 2024). In comparison, in 2009 the population was 1,136,187 people.

Data from 2019 indicated that there are 262,942 households with an average household size of 4.3 persons per household, and a population density of 37 people per square kilometre.

Distribution of Population by Sex and Sub-County
Sub-County	Male	Female	Intersex	Total
Ikutha	39,986	42,976	2	82,964
Katulani	23,150	23,957	1	47,108
Kisasi	22,646	23,496		46,142
Kitui Central	52,123	53,863	5	105,991
Kitui West	33,887	36,983	1	70,871
Kyuso	36,789	40,077	1	76,867
Lower Yatta	31,701	31,628		63,329
Matinyani	23,362	24,448	1	47,811
Migwani	33,525	41,726	4	79,255
Mumoni	13,748	15,596		29,344
Mutitu	26,388	28,896	3	55,287
Mutitu North	10,337	10,877	1	21,215
Mutomo	54,819	58,531	6	113,356
Mwingi Central	52,339	56,174		108,713
Mwingi East	40,314	44,820	5	85,139
Nzambani	22,929	23,857	2	46,788
Thagicu	7,141	7,994	1	15,136
Tseikuru	19,619	21,252		40,871
Total	549,003	587,151	33	1,136,187

The population is mostly made up of people of the Akamba ethnicity. Tharaka people, a section of the Ameru, are also found in Kitui County mainly in Tharaka ward. There is also a growing Somali presence.

Historical population
Year	Pop.	±%
1979	464,283	—
1989	652,603	+40.6%
1999	819,250	+25.5%
2009	1,012,709	+23.6%
2019	1,136,187	+12.2%
2024	1,200,000	+5.6%

=== Administrative Units ===
There are eight sub counties, forty county assembly wards, one hundred and sixty seven locations and four hundred and eleven sub-locations.

Further, the sub-counties are divided into smaller units called wards. There are 40 wards which are further divided into 247 villages.

==== Administrative Sub-Counties ====
- Ikutha sub county
- Katulani sub county
- Kisasi sub county
- Kitui central sub county
- Kitui west sub county
- Kyuso sub county
- Lower yatta sub county
- Matinyani sub county
- Migwani sub county
- Mumoni sub county
- Mutitu sub county
- Mutitu north sub county
- Mutomo sub county
- Mwingi central sub county
- Mwingi east sub county
- Nzambani sub county
- Thagicu sub county
- Tseikuru sub county

==== Electoral Constituencies ====
- Kitui Central Constituency
- Kitui East Constituency
- Kitui Rural Constituency
- Kitui South Constituency
- Kitui West Constituency
- Mwingi Central Constituency
- Mwingi North Constituency
- Mwingi West Constituency

=== Political Leadership ===
Julius Makau Malombe is the governor of the county after being elected in the 2022 general elections. He is deputised by Augustine Kanani Wambua. Eoch Kiio Wambua is the senator who was re-elected in the 2022 general elections after unseating the first senator David Musila. Irene Muthoni Kasalu is the second Women Representative after Winfred Nyiva Mwendwa. She was re-elected in 2022.

For Kitui County, the County Executive Committee comprises:

County Executive Committee
	Number
The Governor	1
The Deputy Governor	1
The County Secretary	1
The CEC Members	10
Total	13

==== Members of Parliament 2017-2022 (Kitui County) ====
- Hon. Mulu, Benson Makali of Wiper Democratic Party Kenya Member of Parliament Kitui Central Constituency
- Hon. Mbai, Nimrod Mbithuka of Jubilee Party Member of Parliament Kitui East Constituency
- Hon. Mboni, David Mwalika of chama cha uma party Member of Parliament Kitui Rural Constituency
- Hon. Nyamai, Rachael Kaki of Jubilee Party Member of Parliament Kitui South Constituency
- Hon. Nyenze, Edith of Wiper Democratic Party Kenya Member of Parliament Kitui West Constituency
- Hon. Mulyungi, Gideon Mutemi of Wiper Democratic Party Kenya Member of Parliament Mwingi Central Constituency
- Hon. Nzengu, Paul Musyimi of Wiper Democratic Party of Kenya Member of Parliament Mwingi North Constituency
- Hon. Nguna, Charles Ngusya of Wiper Democratic Party of Kenya Member of Parliament Mwingi West Constituency

=== Religion ===
Christianity is the dominant religion in Kitui County. Roman Catholics make about 15% of the county's population. Other Christian denominations in the county include The Africa Brotherhood Church (ABC), the African Inland Church (AIC), Anglican Church of Kenya (ACK), Presbyterian Church of East Africa (PCEA), Independent Presbyterian Church (IPC), Redeemed Gospel Church and many others. Kitui county has a significant number of Muslims and several mosques can be spotted around the county's major urban centres.

Religion in Kitui County:

Religion (2019 Census)	Number of people
Catholicism	235,032
Protestant	500,806
Evangelical Churches	248,778
African instituted Churches	60,649
Orthodox	2,297
Other Cristian	30,867
Islam	8,898
Hindu	40
Traditionists	4,278
Other	12,332
No Religion/Atheists	23,778
Don't Know	2,273
Not Stated	106

== Climate ==
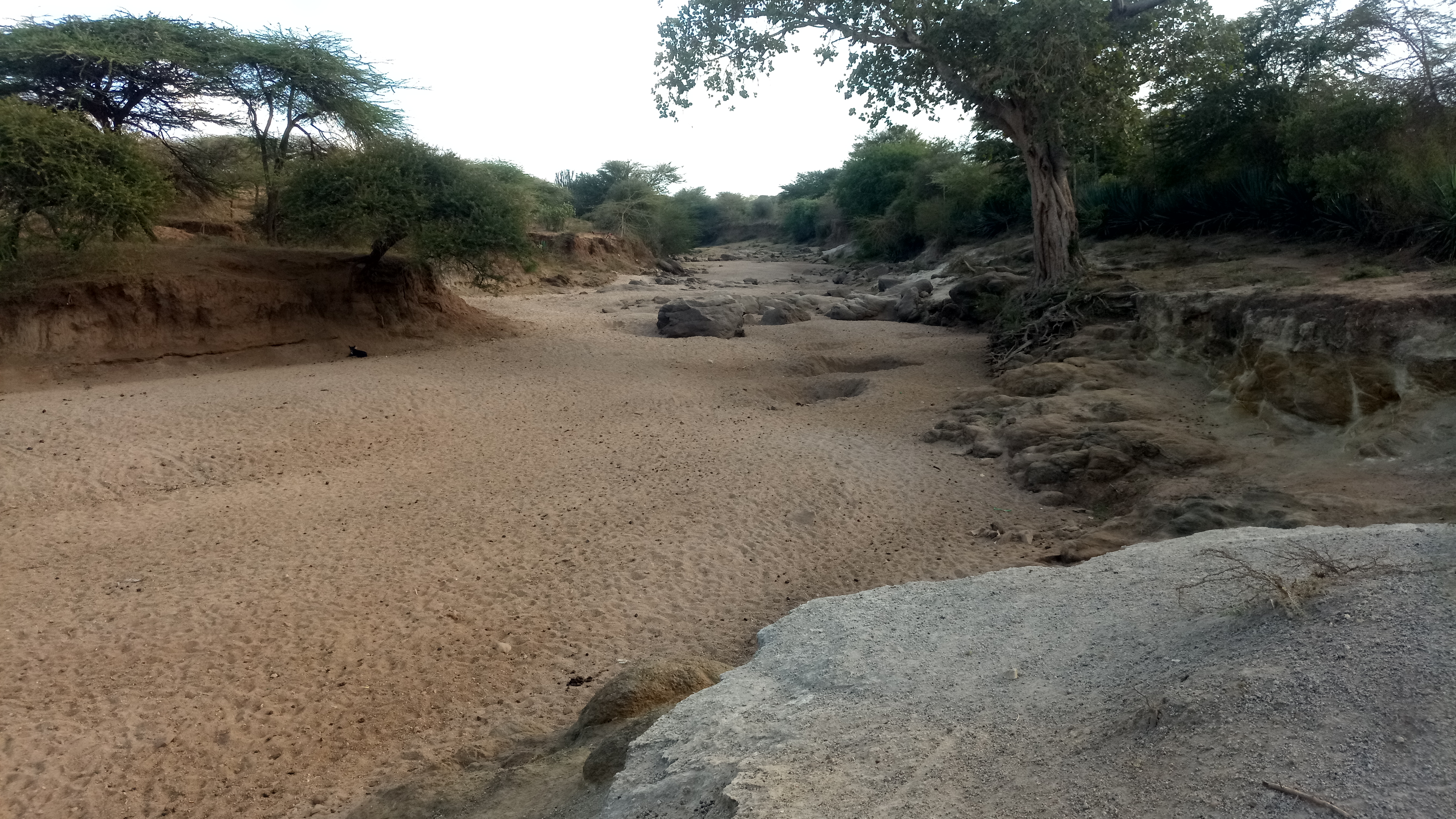
Dry river bed in Kitui County.

The climate of Kitui County is arid and semi-arid. It receives roughly 71 cm (28 inches) per year with a bi-modal rainfall pattern. This means that rainfall occurs practically only during the two rainy seasons (one long around March & April, and one short, around October, November and December). The terms Long and Short Rains has nothing to do with amount of rainfall received but rather on the length of the rainy seasons.

== Infrastructure ==
=== Urban centres ===
The number of city dwellers is relatively low as the majority of people (about 86% of the population) lives in rural areas.

Major towns in the county include Kitui, Mwingi, Mutomo, Kwa Vonza, Mutitu, Ikutha, Kabati, Migwani, Mutonguni, Mbitini and Kyuso.

Urbanisation in South Eastern Kenya
County	Urbanisation in South Eastern Kenya (Per cent)
Machakos County	52
Kitui County	13.8
Makueni County	11.8
Kenya Average	32.3
Urbanisation by County in South Eastern Kenya

=== Education ===
In 2019, Kitui County had "1,742 public primary and secondary schools, representing a student population of slightly over 400,000 pupils and 17,000 teachers. In addition, there were up to 145 private education institutions across the various education levels."

The county has also 5 teachers training colleges, 311 adult training institutions and one technical training institution.

Education Institutions in County
Category	Public	Private	Total	Enrolment
ECD Centres	1518	308	1826	90,731
Primary schools	1318	158	1476	346,022
Secondary schools	374	10	384	73,385
Teachers Training Colleges	3	2	5	
Technical Training Institutes	1	0	1	
Universities	1	0	1	
University Campuses	5	0	5	
Adult Education Centres	311	0	311	12,438

Kitui School and Muthale Girls are the only national schools in Kitui County.

Kathungi Secondary School, which is also found in Kitui County, is famous for its football championship in the country. Kathungi were the 2013 national silver medalists. Alongside the national champions Upper Hill, they represented Kenya in East Africa Secondary School games held in Lira, Uganda.

South Eastern Kenya University is a public university located in Kitui with the Main Campus at Kwa Vonza and other campuses at Mwingi and Kitui towns. Kenyatta University has a campus at Kwa Vonza while Moi University has a campus at Kyuso in Mwingi North sub-county. University of Nairobi also has a campus in Kitui town. Kenya Medical Training College has campuses in Kitui and Mwingi.

Additional funds are required to improve the water supply situation for schools. These investments would pay for new or upgraded water facilities in schools, and a professional operation and maintenance service. With regards to water infrastructure, schools would benefit from rainwater harvesting systems and piped water schemes and handpump sources if they do not already have these facilities.

=== Health ===
There are a total of 256 health facilities in the county with one county referral hospital. County has 2,084 health personnel of different cadre.

HIV prevalence is at 4.2% below the national 5.9%.

Health Facilities by Ownership
	Government	*FBO	Private	NGO	TOTAL
Hospitals	11	2	1		14
Health centres	38	2			40
Dispensaries	183	10	18		201
Clinics		3			1

Kitui County has several hospitals and health centres to meet the health needs of residents, among them Kitui County Referral Hospital, Mwingi Sub-County General Hospital, Kitui Nursing Home, Neema Hospital, Jordan Hospital, mission-run hospitals such as Muthale Mission hospital and some private health centres.

=== Water supply and sanitation ===
Kitui County is about 160 kilometers east of Nairobi City and has about 1,221,000 people. The two water service providers (WSPs) in the county are Kitui Water and Sanitation Company (KITWASCO) and Kiambere-Mwingi Water and Sanitation Company (KIMWASCO). They served only 32 percent of the county's population in 2017 and mainly only in urban areas, not so much in rural areas. Only about 42 percent of the population in Kitui County have access to at least a basic water service. In 2017, there were "3,126 equipped and non-equipped water sources spread across Kitui County". Equipped sources include hand pumps and piped schemes. Non-equipped sources include sand dams, earth dams, shallow wells and others. However, in a water audit carried out in 2017, only 60 percent of the water sources were fully functional.

About 400,000 people in Kitui rely on surface water as their main drinking water source and many people practice rainwater harvesting via roofs and gutters, rock catchments and sand dams. For these people, the extended dry period (June to October) creates water supply challenges. Groundwater resources, lifted by hand pumps or pumped to piped systems and water kiosks, offer a buffer against drought for many Kitui county residents. However there are issues with quality (natural salinity), infrastructure maintenance and functionality for these groundwater schemes.

Piped water schemes have fewer or no customers during the wet season because "users shift to using free surface and groundwater alternatives". The customers tend to shift to shallow wells during the wet season even though this exposes them to health risks.

The majority of schools in Kitui County have no handwashing facilities (53%). This causes a range of disadvantages for students, one of them being for adolescent girls to have to manage menstrual hygiene needs without access to handwashing facilities.

== Economy ==
The vast majority of the economy is based on sustenance farming, despite the fact that the agriculture is an extremely challenging endeavor giving the sporadic rainfall. A logical move therefore would be a transition to non-agricultural industries.

During a recent, informal survey of the businesses in the town of Ikutha in southern Kitui County, the following businesses were identified:

- Butcheries
- Food Staples (rice, corn meal)
- Mini-markets (sells things like Coca-Cola, potato chips, bread, long-shelf milk)
- Mechanics
- Pubs
- Hotels and restaurants

=== Industries ===
Situated in Kitui town is a cotton ginnery where cotton farmers from around the county can deliver their harvest. It is the only major industry in the region, and was set up way back in 1935. Kitui is a semi-arid region and not many crops fare well there apart from cotton, hence the ginnery plays a major role creating income for the many cotton farmers in the region.

=== Minerals ===
Kitui county has large deposits of coal in Mui Basin, having low energy content/calorific value, meaning it produces less heat when burned. It also has sulphur. The coal could potentially supply the 1,000 MW Lamu Coal Power Station, and the 960-megawatt (MW) Kitui coal plant.

Mutomo/Ikutha district contains limestone.

=== Wealth/Poverty Level ===
Wealth/Poverty Level in South Eastern Kenya (source:)
County	Poverty Level in South Eastern Kenya (Per cent)
Machakos County	59.6
Kitui County	63.1
Makueni County	64.1
Kenya Average	45.9

Statistics for Kitui County (Per cent)
County	Population
Literacy	74.7
Attending School (15-18 Yrs)	77.8
Paved Roads	2.4
Good Roads	39.9
Electricity Access	4.8

== Tourism ==
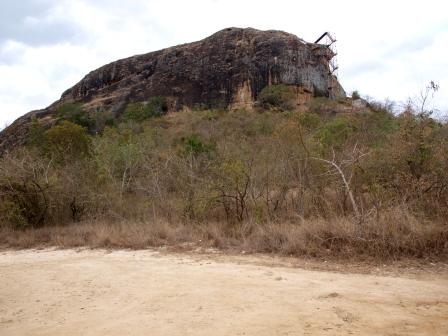
Nzambani Rock is one of the tourist attractions in Kitui County

- Tsavo East National Park
- South Kitui National Reserve
- Mwingi National Reserve
- Ikoo Valley
- Ngomeni Rock Catchment.

=== Nzambani Rock ===
Also in Kitui county is one of the largest Rock outcrops in Kenya which is locally known as "Ivia ya Nzambani". Situated past Kitui Town, about 1 km from Chuluni Market is the Nzambani Rock which is famous for the tales and myths of its origin. Activities here include hiking and rock climbing.

== Notable people ==
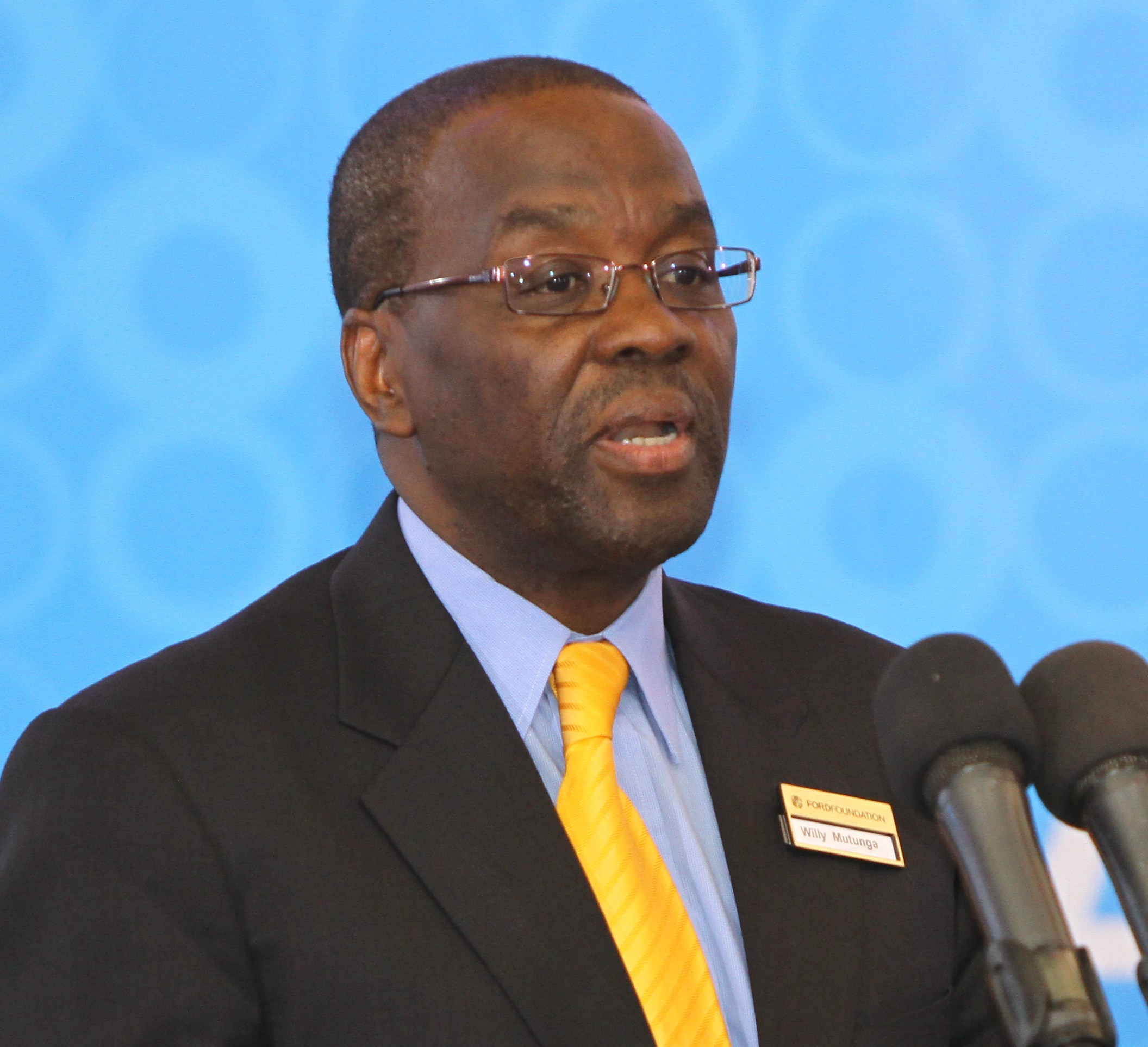
Dr. Willy Munyoki Mutunga, the former Chief Justice, hails from Kitui County

- Willy Mutunga, Former Chief Justice of Kenya
- Kalonzo Musyoka, 10th Vice-President of Kenya
- John Mbiti, Kenyan-born Christian Philosopher, priest and writer
- Julius Malombe, The first Governor of Kitui County
- Makau W. Mutua, Former dean of the University of Buffalo Law School
- Charity Ngilu, Former MP Kitui Central (The former Governor of Kitui County)
- David Musila, Former Member of Parliament of Kitui West Constituency
- Nzamba Kitonga, Former president of the East Africa Law Society and COMESA Court of Justice
- Kiema Kilonzo, Kenyan ambassador to Turkey
- Eric Mutua, Former chairman of the Law Society of Kenya and Treasurer of the East Africa Law Society
- Onesmus Kimweli Mutungi, Former Chancellor of Kenyatta University and the first Kenyan to get Doctor of Law degree
- Ngala Mwendwa, Former Minister of Labour in the first Kenyan post-independence cabinet
- Nyiva Mwendwa, The first Kitui County Woman Representative and first Kenyan woman to serve as a cabinet minister
- Kitili Maluki Mwendwa, First black Chief Justice of Kenya
- Benson Masya, Kenyan long-distance runner and marathon serial winner and the winner of the inaugural IAAF World Half Marathon Championships in 1992
- Benjamin Nzimbi, Retired Archbishop and Primate of the Anglican Church of Kenya
- Musili Wambua, Associate Dean of the University of Nairobi School of Law and the first Chancellor of University of Embu
- John Nzau Mwangangi, Kenyan long-distance runner and the gold medalist at the 2011 African Cross Country Championships

== See also ==
- Counties of Kenya
