= A9 road (Kenya) =

Road in Kenya

A9 Road

Route information
- Maintained by Kenya National Highways Authority

Major junctions
- North end: Subuiga
- South end: Kibwezi

Location
- Country: Kenya

Highway system
- Transport in Kenya

The A9 road is a road in Kenya spanning a total distance of 398 kilometers. It traverses the central region of the country in a north–south direction, connecting the towns of Subuiga, Meru, and Embu, before terminating in Kibwezi.

== Route ==
The A9 trunk road originates in Subuiga, intersecting with the A2 highway on the northern slope of Mount Kenya, Africa's second-highest peak at 5,199 meters. From there, the A9 traverses the eastern flank of the mountain, winding its way through the mountain's slopes, passing through varied elevations: approximately 2,000 meters in the north, and 1,300-1,500 meters in the eastern and southern sections. South of Mount Kenya lies the town of Embu. The A9 continues southward, entering a drier savannah region at an elevation of around 1,000 meters. The road crosses the Kamburu Dam and remains paved throughout this section. A short overlap with the A3 highway occurs before the A9 resumes its southern trajectory. The road gradually descends to approximately 700 meters above sea level before terminating in Kibwezi, where it meets the A8 highway.

== History ==
The northern section of the A9 route traverses areas surrounding Mount Kenya and the highlands further south, which have been paved for an extended period. Notably, the construction of the Kamburu Dam, spanning the A9 motorway, took place between 1971 and 1974. In contrast, the southern portion of the route was paved later, with initial efforts focusing on the segment between the A3 highway and Kitui, which was fully completed in the mid-2000s. The 192-kilometer stretch south of Kitui remained unpaved for a longer duration, with paving commencing around 2017 and substantially concluding in 2021.

=== Road number history ===
Historically, the road was categorized as a lower-class route, designated as B6 in the northern section spanning from Mount Kenya to Embu, and B7 in the southern section from Embu to Kibwezi. In 2016, these sections were unified and reclassified as the A9.
