= Ngala Mwendwa =

Kenyan politician

Eliud Ngala Mwendwa (1923 – June 8, 2016) was a Kenyan teacher and politician. He was a member of the Kenyan delegation to the 1960 Lancaster House Conference, which negotiated the country's independence from the United Kingdom. Mwendwa then served as Minister for Labour within President Jomo Kenyatta's first post-independence 15-member cabinet. He ultimately served as the Minister for Labour and Social Services from 1963 until 1974 under Kenyatta.

== Early life ==
Mwendwa was born in 1923 to Kitui Paramount Chief Mwendwa Kitavi and his fifth wife (Kitavi had seven wives). His brother, Kitili Maluki Mwendwa, became the first African-born Chief Justice of Kenya. Another brother, Kyale Mwendwa, was a former Cabinet minister and director of education. Mwendwa's sister-in-law, Nyiva Mwendwa, became the first woman to serve as a Cabinet minister in Kenya's history.

== Overview ==
He graduated from Kagumo Teachers College and worked as a teacher until he entered politics in the 1950s and 1960s. He was first elected to the Legislative Council of Kitui.

Mwendwa was first elected to the Legislative Council of Kenya (Legco) from Kitui in 1963 after the country gained independence. He then served as an MP for Kitui in Legco's successor, the National Assembly, from 1963 until 1969. In 1969, Mwendwa moved to nearby Kitui Central Constituency, which he represented as an MP from 1969 to 1974. In 1974, Mwendwa was defeated for re-election by Daniel Mutinda, the former Minister of Information and Broadcasting.

== Death ==
Ngala Mwendwa died from complications of a heart attack at the Nairobi Hospital ICU unit on June 8, 2016, at the age of 93. He was buried at his home in Ithookwe, Kitui County, on June 18, 2016. He was survived by his wife, Priscilla Kavutha Mwendwa, and their eight children. Mwendwa's first wife, Agnes Kana, died in 1960.
