= Kwa Vonza =

- Location within Kenya
- Coordinates: 1°23′02″S 37°49′46″E
- Country: Kenya
- County: Kitui County
- Time zone: UTC+3 (EAT)

Kwa Vonza is a highly populated market town in Kitui County, to the west of Kitui town, along Kitui - Machakos road.

It houses the main campus of South Eastern Kenya University and a satellite campus of Kenyatta University (Kitui Campus).

== History ==
Kwa Vonza is also famous with Colonial British settlers such as the founder of this town, locally called Vonza, whose grave is believed to be at a cross found at the peak of the Kwa Vonza hill.

Kwa Vonza area is now a major picnic spot frequented by university students and locals. Some local churches also hold prayers on the spot around the cross.

== Economic activities ==
Kwa Vonza has seen a rapid growth in the recent past due to the opening of the two universities in the area and also its location at the junction of Kitui - Machakos road and Kwa Vonza - Kanyangi road.

Kwa Vonza market, which is most vibrant on Fridays sells vegetables, livestock, fruits and fabrics.

Kwa Vonza mainly provides accommodation to the students of the two universities and it therefore has a large number of residential houses, hotels, restaurants and recreational places.

Major hotels and restaurants in Kwa Vonza include Moonlight Hotel, club 1.1, Trump, jupiter Hard Rock restaurant, Ideal Place, Miyajima, Bench, Tamasha among others.

Kwa Vonza also borders an extensive area which is covered with a natural forest which contains a large number of indigenous trees and shrubs. This forest is maintained by a Japanese Research Institute - JICA and is inhabited by wild animals such as a wide range of snakes, hares, dikdiks and monkeys.

== Education ==
Kwa Vonza is the home to South Eastern Kenya University (SEKU) - Main Campus and Kenyatta University - Kitui Campus.

Secondary schools around the Kwa Vonza area include St. Paul's Kwa Vonza Secondary School, Masaani St. Marys Secondary school and Tanganyika Secondary School. There are many Primary schools.
