= Kyuso =

- Location within Kenya
- Coordinates: 0°33′24″S 38°12′45″E
- Country: Kenya
- Province: Eastern Province

Population (2019)
  - Total: 76,867
  - Density: 30/km^{2} (78/sq mi)
- Time zone: UTC+3 (EAT)

Kyuso is a town and sub-county in Kitui County, Kenya. Before the 2009 Constitution of Kenya implemented counties, it was in the Eastern Province and was a division of Mwingi District.

== Town and sub-county ==
Kyuso is one of the major towns of Kitui County. At the 2019 census, Kyuso sub-county had an area of 2,525 square kilometres (975 sq mi) and a population of 76,867, of whom 36,789 were male and 40,077 female. The population is predominately Kamba and Tharaka people.

It was formerly a division of Mwingi District within the Eastern Province.

== Economy ==
The majority of people in the area are farmers. They face problems from drought, locusts and regional armed conflicts.

== Education ==
As of 2012 there were 20 secondary schools in Kyuso, all boarding schools, of which two were provincial schools and 18 district schools, with an average enrolment of 250. Two were for boys, three for girls and 15 co-educational.

== See also ==
- List of volcanoes in Kenya
