= Opinion polling for the 2007 Kenyan general election =

Opinion polls played an important role in the runup to the Kenyan elections of December 2007. A number of institutes published results on the presidential candidates. Nation Media employed the Kenyan Steadman market information company to conduct regular polls, which thus received the widest attention.

Polls are a new instrument on the Kenyan political scene. Recent elections had seen some results published which met, however, with widespread scepticism.

The publication of polls in 2007 generated large interest and controversy as they were alternatively welcomed or condemned by parties and observers on the national scene and frequently criticised as having been manipulated by one or the other side.

Generally polls showed in early stages a lead for President Mwai Kibaki and a strong showing of Kalonzo Musyoka on the opposition side.

After realignments in the opposition Raila Odinga had managed to get the support of regional leaders from a multi-tribal background and Musyoka looked largely reduced to his Kamba hometurf. This showed in the polls with Odinga surging ahead.

After re-formation on the president's side criticism at Odinga became more pointed and this message seems to have had effect in narrowing the difference between the leading presidential contestants.

== National polls ==
Poll date	Kibaki	Musyoka	Odinga	Mudavadi	Ruto	Kenyatta
October 2006	41%	20%	13%		3%	5%
December 2006	42%	20%	14%		3%	5%
March 2007	51%	14%	17%	2%	2%	2%
April 2007	44.3%	15.3%	18.7%	2.7%	2.6%	3.5%
June 2007	45%	14%	28%	4%	3%	4%
July 2007	45%	11%	25%	3%	2%	2%
August 2007	42%	11%	25%	8%	6%	1%
August 2007	47%	13%	36%	1%		1%
September 2007	38%	8%	47%			
13 October 2007	37%	8%	53%			
23 October 2007	39%	8%	50%			
9 November 2007	41%	11%	45%			
21 November 2007	41.4%	14.7%	40.7%			
17 November 2007	42%	11%	45%			
23 November 2007	43.3%	11.4%	43.6%			
7 December 2007	42%	10%	46%			
18 December 2007	43%	10%	45%			

== Regional polls ==
=== 23 September 2007 ===
Province	Kibaki	Odinga	Musyoka	Undecided
Nairobi	40%	44%	10%	5%

=== 29 September 2007 ===
Province	Kibaki	Odinga	Musyoka	Undecided	RTA
Central	79%	12%	1%	4%	–
Coast	36%	48%	6%	8%	–
Eastern	49%	34%	6%	3%	–
Nairobi	37%	51%	5%	4%	–
North Eastern	27%	70%	3%	0%	–
Nyanza	8%	85%	0%	2%	–
Rift Valley	35%	53%	3%	8%	–
Western	25%	65%	4%	3%	–
# of Wins	2	6	0		

=== 23 October 2007 ===
Province	Kibaki	Odinga	Musyoka	Undecided	RTA
Central	89%	5%	2%	–	–
Coast	36%	49%	10%	–	–
Eastern	55%	8%	36%	–	–
Nairobi	43%	46%	8%	–	–
North Eastern	20%	77%	1%	–	–
Nyanza	17%	82%	0%	–	–
Rift Valley	29%	65%	4%	–	–
Western	29%	61%	3%	–	–
# of Wins	2	6	0		

=== 23 November 2007 ===
Province	Kibaki	Odinga	Musyoka	Undecided	RTA
Central	92.8%	5.0%	2.0%	–	–
Coast	34.7%	51.5%	9.7%	–	–
Eastern	48.9%	6.1%	43.8%	–	–
Nairobi	46.3%	39.3%	12.1%	–	–
North Eastern	32.2%	64.4%	3.4%	–	–
Nyanza	11.9%	85.3%	1.8%	–	–
Rift Valley	39.3%	55.8%	3.9%	–	–
Western	20.7%	72.8%	1.4%	–	–
# of wins	3	5	0		

=== 7 December 2007 ===
Province	Kibaki	Odinga	Musyoka
Central	91%	8%	–
Coast	35%	63%	10%
Eastern	46%	6%	44%
Nairobi	41%	47%	–
North Eastern	27%	65%	–
Nyanza	19%	78%	–
Rift Valley	36%	61%	–
Western	21%	69%	–
# of wins	2	6	0
