= Ekani =

Village in Kitui County, Kenya

Ekani is a small village in Kitui County, Kenya.

== Poverty ==
Ekani is among the poorest communities in the county. The poverty there is said to be "staggering." The severe drought affecting all of Kenya has especially affected this community.

The Ekani Community Development Programme, an NGO, has the following goal: "Reducing poverty amongst the community through initiating development projects in water, environment, community health care, education, informal sector and any other related project."

The closest dispensary for Ekani, with only three attendants and is located 12 km away. It was built with great community effort and was to serve both Kanziku and Simisi, but now has been abandoned because there are no funds to run it. The school has no electricity, which hinders learning.
