= Mbitini =

- Location within Kenya
- Coordinates: 1.16°S 38.15°E
- Country: Kenya
- County: Kitui County

Population
  - Total: 24,858
  - Density: 189.6/km^{2} (491/sq mi)
- Time zone: UTC+3 (EAT)

Mbitini is a growing market town in Kitui County, former Eastern Province, Kenya, that is approximately 40 km south-east of Kitui town. It is the administrative centre of Mbitini County Assembly Ward with a total population of 24,858.
