= David Musila =

Kenyan politician

Senator for Kitui County
- Incumbent
- Assumed office 28 March 2013- August 2017

Assistant Minister of State for Defence
- In office 17 April 2008 – 10 April 2013

Member of Parliament for Mwingi South Constituency
- In office 3 February 1998 – 14 January 2013
- Succeeded by: (abolished)

Deputy Speaker of the National Assembly of Kenya
- In office 9 January 2003 – 22 October 2007
- President: Mwai Kibaki
- Preceded by: Joab Omino
- Succeeded by: Farah Maalim

Personal details
- Born: 24 February 1943 (age 83) Kenya
- Party: WDM-K
- Children: 4
- Education: Bishop College (BA)

David Musila (born 24 February 1943) is a Kenyan politician. He belongs to the Wiper Democratic Movement and was elected to represent Mwingi South Constituency in the National Assembly of Kenya in the Kenyan parliamentary election of 1997. In 2013 he was elected as the first senator representing Kitui County.

== Early education ==
Musila attended Maseno School for his high school education.

== Career ==
After graduating from Bishop College, Texas with an Honors degree in Economics and Government in 1968, Musila returned to Kenya and enrolled in the government. He was appointed as District Officer (D.O) and was posted in Nakuru and later Molo. He rose to the position of District Commissioner in 1974 before serving as Deputy Provincial Commissioner in 1978. He was appointed Provincial Commissioner for Central Province by President Daniel Arap Moi in 1979, a post which he retained until 1985, after which he was appointed Director of Tourism in the Ministry of Wildlife and Tourism. He retired from the civil service in 1988. He served as consultant on tourism for the World Tourism Organisation until 2010.

== Political life ==
In 1997 he was elected as a KANU MP and retained his seat after moving to the LDP wing of NARC in 2002. He was re-elected in Mwingi south and elected Deputy-Speaker in the 2003 Parliament and defended his seat in the 2007 elections on a ODM-K ticket. In April 2008 he was appointed as assistant minister of Defence by President Mwai Kibaki where he served until 2013. He was elected as the first senator of Kitui County on March 4, 2013 by garnering 156,690 votes. He served in the Senate Committee on Energy, Roads and Transport. Musila also served in the Parliamentary Service Commission as Chairman of Security & Development Committee, member of audit committee of the Commission, Staff Welfare Committee of the Commission. The former senator also served as chairman of Wiper Democratic Movement Kenya until his resignation.

Hon. David Musila is the author of a book titled "Seasons of Hope" that is a written memoir of his life as a public servant.

He is the chairperson of the David Musila foundation.
