= South Eastern Kenya University =

Public university in Kwa Vonza, Kenya

- Other name: SEKU
- Motto: Arid to Green...Transforming Lives
- Type: Public
- Established: 1976 Ukamba Agricultural Institute; 2008 South Eastern University College; 2013 South Eastern Kenya University
- Chancellor: Dr. Titus Naikuni
- Vice-Chancellor: Prof. Eng. Douglas Shitanda
- Students: 8,000
- Location: Kwa Vonza, Kitui County, Kenya
- Campus: 14,500 acres (5,900 ha); Sub-Urban
- Website: seku.ac.ke

South Eastern Kenya University (SEKU) is a public university with its main campus located in Kwa Vonza, Kitui County, Kenya.

It was formerly South Eastern University College "SEUCO", a constituent college of The University of Nairobi prior to its award of Charter in 2013.

The Vice Chancellor of SEKU is Prof.Eng. Douglas Shitanda.

Mission:To provide quality education through teaching, research, extension, innovation and entrepreneurship with emphasis on areas including food and nutrition, security, health engineering, technology and environmental management.

== Location ==
It is specifically located near Kwa Vonza along the Machakos-Kitui Highway and close to the Kitui Campus of Kenyatta University. The gate is about 7 km from the Kwa Vonza junction, but most structures in the university are about 17 km from the junction.

== Undergraduate Courses ==
  1. Bachelor of Arts
  2. Bachelor of Arts (Social Work)
  3. Bachelor of Arts (Gender & Development Studies)
  4. Bachelor of Education (Arts)
  5. Bachelor of Education (Science)
  6. Bachelor of Education (Early Childhood)
  7. Bachelor of Science (Agriculture)
  8. Bachelor of Science (Dryland Agriculture)
  9. Bachelor of Science (Horticulture)
  10. Bachelor of Science (Range Management)
  11. Bachelor of Science (Dryland Animal Science)
  12. Bachelor of Science (Foods Nutrition and Dietetics)
  13. Bachelor of Science (Agribusiness Management & Entrepreneurship)
  14. Bachelor of Science (Agricultural Education & Extension)
  15. Bachelor of Science (Hydrology and Water Resources Management)
  16. Bachelor of Science (Fisheries Management and Aquatic Technology)
  17. Bachelor of Science (Applied Aquaculture Sciences)
  18. Bachelor of Science (Mathematics)
  19. Bachelor of Science (Actuarial Science)
  20. Bachelor of Science (Statistics)
  21. Bachelor of Science (Biology )
  22. Bachelor of Science (Molecular Biology & Biochemistry)
  23. Bachelor of Science (Chemistry)
  24. Bachelor of Science (Physics)
  25. Bachelor of Science (Electronics)
  26. Bachelor of Science (Forestry)
  27. Bachelor of Science (Environmental Conservation & Natural Resources Management)
  28. Bachelor of Science (Land Resources Management)
  29. Bachelor of Science (Environmental Management)
  30. Bachelor of Science ( Agro-ecosystems and Environmental Management)
  31. Bachelor of Science (Public Health)
  32. Bachelor of Science (Nursing)
  33. Bachelor of Science (Population Health)
  34. Bachelor of Science (Meteorology)
  35. Bachelor of Science (Geology)
  36. Bachelor of Science (Computer Science)
  37. Bachelor of Information Technology
  38. Bachelor of Commerce
  39. Bachelor of Procurement and Supply Chain Management
  40. Bachelor of Economics and Statistics
  41. Bachelor of Economics
  42. Bachelor of Project Planning & Management
  43. Bachelor of Business & Information Technology
  44. Bachelor of Science in Medical Microbiology.
  45. Bachelor of Science in Aquatic Sciences
  46. Bachelor of Law

== Masters Programmes ==
  1. Master of Business Administration
  2. Master of Science (Agro meteorology)
  3. Master of Science (Mineral Exploration and Mining)
  4. Master of Science (Exploration Geo-Physics)
  5. Master of Education
  6. Master of Education ( Kiswahili Methods)
  7. Master of Education (Early Childhood Education)
  8. Master of Science (Environmental Management)
  9. Master of Science (Climate Change & Agroforestry)
  10. Master of Science (Agricultural Resource Management)
  11. Master of Science (Livestock Production Systems)
  12. Master of Science (Agronomy)
  13. Master of Science (Mammalian Physiology)
  14. Master of Science (Reproductive Biology)
  15. Master of Science (Rangeland Resources Management)
  16. Master of Science (Public Health)
  17. Master of Science (Epidemiology)
  18. Master of Science (International Health)
  19. Master of Science (Infectious Disease Diagnosis)
  20. Master of Science( Biotechnology)
  21. Master of Science (Biochemistry)
  22. Master of Science (Physics)
  23. Master of Science (Integrated Water Resources Management)
  24. Master of Science (Biodiversity Conservation and Management)

== PHD Programmes ==
1. Doctor of Philosophy (Dryland Resource Management)
2. Doctor of Philosophy (Agricultural Economics)
3. Doctor of Philosophy (Environmental Management)
4. Doctor of Philosophy (Climate Change & Agroforestry)
5. Doctor of Philosophy (Educational Administration and Planning)
6. Doctor of Philosophy (Physics)
7. Doctor of Philosophy (Animal Science)

== Certificate And Diploma Programmes ==
1. Short Course in Computer Applications
2. Certificate in Animal Health Husbandry
3. Certificate in Artificial Insemination and Fertility Management
4. Certificate in Information Technology
5. Certificate in Computer Packages & Applications
6. Certificate in Environmental Impact Assessment(EIA) and Audit
7. Diploma in Sales and Marketing
8. Diploma in Human Resource Management
9. Diploma in Purchasing and Supplies Management
10. Diploma in Business Management
11. Diploma in Forestry
12. Diploma in Information Technology
13. Diploma in Computer Science
14. Diploma in Range land Management
15. Diploma in Apiculture
16. Diploma in Animal Health
17. Diploma in Crop Protection
18. Diploma in Electronics

== Schools ==
1. School of Environment, Water and Natural Resources
2. School of Education
3. School of Humanities and Social Sciences
4. School of Pure and Applied Sciences
5. School of Business and Economics
6. School of Environment & Natural Resources Management
7. School of Engineering and Technology
8. School of Agriculture and Veterinary Sciences
9. School of Nursing Sciences and Public Health
10. School of Law(commercial, public and private law)

== Research ==
The University is said to be taking a leading role in the making of water purification devices. SEKU has distributed low-cost ceramic water filters to more than 1,000 residents of Kitui and its environs. The move is aimed at improving the socio-economic parameters and health of the locals by having them access clean water. This is because most of this region is semi-arid.

== Campuses ==
- SEKU Main Campus (Kwa Vonza)
- Mtito-Andei Town Campus
- Kitui Town campus
- Migwani Center

== See also ==
- List of universities in Kenya
- Education in Kenya
