= Makau Mutua =

Kenyan-American professor of law

Makau W. Mutua (born 1958) is a Kenyan-American professor at the SUNY Buffalo School of Law and was its dean from 2008 to 2014. He teaches international human rights, international business transactions and international law. He is vice president of the American Society of International Law and a member of the Council on Foreign Relations.

He is a second-generation scholar of the Third World Approaches to International Law (TWAIL), which is critical of the colonial foundations of the extant international law.

In 2016, he made an unsuccessful bid for the office of Chief Justice at the Supreme Court of Kenya.

Mutua has faced criticism and lawsuits concerning his tenure as Dean and professor at Buffalo School of Law.

== Early life and education ==
Makau Mutua was born Robert Mutua in Kitui, Kenya, in 1958, the second of seven children. He was educated at Kitui School and Alliance High School, and in 1975 graduated from an American high school in Fisher, Illinois, to which he was taken by Catholic missionaries. He recounted for a Nairobi newspaper that "the Catholic Church had murdered my spirit as an African. I contemplated dropping the name Robert before going to Illinois, but didn’t know how – and lacked the courage to do so at that age. It was only after I returned from America that I "killed" Robert and left the church."

In May 1981, his education at the University of Nairobi was disrupted by his anti-government activism. He left Nairobi and enrolled in the University of Dar es Salaam, where he graduated in 1983 and 1984 with bachelor’s and master’s degrees in law. He then returned to the United States, where he earned an LL.M in 1985 and an S.J.D. in 1987 at Harvard University.

== Legal and academic career ==
He was an associate for one year at a commercial law firm in New York, where he worked on equipment leasing, licensing, and distributorship contracts, and then moved to Human Rights First, at that time known as the Lawyers Committee for Human Rights, where he directed the Africa Project. In 1991, he returned to Harvard as associate director of its human rights program. In 1996, he joined the SUNY Buffalo Law faculty.

In 2003, while on sabbatical, he was appointed to an official task force that recommended a "truth, justice, and reconciliation" commission for Kenya. That year he was also a delegate to a constitutional conference, which attempted to draft a new constitution for Kenya. In 2006, he was an advisor to John Githongo, the former anti-corruption czar who exposed the Anglo-Leasing scandal in the Kibaki government. He is also chairman of the board of the Kenya Human Rights Commission, which is registered in Nairobi as a non-profit political advocacy group or NGO.

In December 2007, following the resignation of his predecessor, R. Nils Olsen, Jr., Mutua was appointed interim dean of the Buffalo School of Law. He was reappointed as dean by the university's provost in May 2008, after the failure of a national job search. He remained in office until December 2014 after he resigned.

In January 2017, Mutua was appointed to a four-year-term as Editor of the Routledge Series on Law in Africa.

== Memberships, honors and awards ==
In 2015, Mutua received the Distinguished Africanist Award from the New York African Studies Association at its 40th Annual Conference.

He was elected vice president of the American Society of International Law from 2011 to 2013 after serving on its executive council from 2007 to 2010.

In May 2010, he became a member of the Sigma Pi Phi fraternity, the first Greek-letter society founded by African-American men in the United States and has been named several times as among the most influential black lawyers and educators in the United States.

== Application for Chief Justice, Supreme Court, Kenya ==
Following the early retirement of Dr. Willy Mutunga from the Office of Chief Justice of the Supreme Court of Kenya in June 2016, Mutua applied for the office of Chief Justice in response to the vacancy announcement by the Judicial Service Commission. During an interview for the position, Attorney General Githu Muigai questioned Mutua over his tweets not recognizing the election of Uhuru Kenyatta as President of Kenya in March 2013. Mutua responded that he would have no problems working with the President if he was appointed Chief Justice, and that his comments were made as a private citizen. In addition, the Attorney General questioned his qualifications for chief justice on the grounds that he has not resided in Kenya or paid Kenyan taxes for over thirty years, and has never tried a case or served in any judicial office. Mutua responded with his readiness to renounce his American citizenship.

When the interviews ended, the commission announced that it had settled on Kenyan Court of Appeal Judge David Maraga as the nominee for the Office of Chief Justice. Mutua was ranked third in the interviews.

== Controversies at SUNY Buffalo ==
=== Faculty dissent ===
Some faculty members claimed "Mutua’s management style divided the school at a time of great economic turmoil.... Critics say Mutua, who came from within the ranks of the faculty, arrived in the dean’s office with a 'divide and rule' philosophy that placed a priority on loyalty and penalized critics while rewarding allies." A professor had sued the school and Mutua for wrongful termination in 2008, and nine professors supported the plaintiff's account of the matter. The lawsuit ended with Mutua prevailing in 2017, years after he had already resigned his deanship.

Those who were in support of Mutua's deanship describing that "alumni and donors view his stewardship as a much-needed step forward. In their eyes, Mutua shook up a moribund faculty, reached out to alums who felt alienated from the school and succeeded in raising $23 million in private donations. They say the law school’s endowment has nearly doubled since he became dean...."

=== Criticism for absence ===
The law school's official history has praised Mutua for "bringing a global focus to the School of Law, drawing on the numerous human rights, diplomatic and rule of law missions he had conducted in countries in Africa, Latin America and Europe." In May 2009, the law school sponsored the visit of a Kenyan government delegation, where then-Prime Minister Raila Odinga gave newly graduated lawyers and their families a lecture about African politics and praised Makau Mutua as "a great Kenyan patriot."

However, the campus newspaper The Spectrum reported that "[f]aculty and students who were interviewed offered tepid to scathing critiques of Mutua’s tenure and many students insist they have never seen Mutua on campus nor interacted with him." He was criticized for his disengagement from campus life and prolonged absences while he toured many international destinations.

=== Criticism concerning law-school-ranking ===
In 2010, Mutua has been accused of presiding over SUNY Buffalo's drop below the top one-hundred American law schools for the first time in its history, despite his pledge to devote his deanship to returning it to the top fifty.

In 2016, the campus newspaper criticized Mutua for hiring eighteen new professors during a decade in which the law school's enrollment was dropping by almost 40% alleging that the imbalance resulted in the resignations, buy-outs, or early retirements of more than half the faculty and a tuition that doubled in the aftermath of his deanship.

=== Criticism concerning income ===
After Mutua had taken a sabbatical in 2015 and accepted a consultancy at the World Bank, he was criticized by the campus newspaper that "the university is still paying the former law school dean his full salary – a salary that nears $300,000 – despite being away from the school and taking on outside work."

== Newspaper columnist ==
Mutua, for the better part of a decade, was a columnist for the Sunday Nation, one of the two main newspapers in East and Central Africa. In September 2013, he departed the Sunday Nation and joined the Standard on Sunday, the Sunday Nation's chief competitor. He returned to the Sunday Nation in July 2019.

== Selected works ==
- Human Rights Standards: Hegemony, Law, and Politics. SUNY Press. March 2016 ISBN 978-1-4384-5939-4
- Kenya's Quest For Democracy: Taming Leviathan (Challenge and Change in African Politics). L. Rienner Publishers. 30 April 2008 ISBN 1-58826-590-0
- Human Rights NGOs in East Africa: Political and Normative Tensions. University of Pennsylvania Press. 12 September 2008 ISBN 978-0-8122-4112-9
- Human Rights: A Political and Cultural Critique. University of Pennsylvania Press. 10 November 2008 ISBN 0-8122-2049-8
- Zaire: Repression As Policy (with Peter Rosenblum), New York: Lawyers Committee for Human Rights, 1990.
