= Daniel Musyoka Mutinda =

Kenyan politician

Daniel Musyoka Mutinda served as member of the National Assembly of Kenya for Kitui Central constituency between 1974 and 1979. Born in 1942 in Kitui town, he attended Kitui School before proceeding to Syracuse University, New York, for his university studies. He later joined the University of East Africa to pursue a Bachelor of Laws (LLB) degree at the faculty of law in Dar es Salaam, Tanzania.

== Elections ==
Mutinda worked with Kaplan and Stratton Advocates, Nairobi, before contesting the Kitui Central parliamentary seat in 1974. He beat the incumbent, Eliud Ngala Mwendwa, to become the then youngest member of parliament in Kenya. He was appointed to cabinet by the late president Mzee Jomo Kenyatta, and served in the then ministry of Information and Broadcasting.

Mutinda was re-elected to parliament in the 1979 Kenyan general elections but lost his seat to challenger Titus Mbathi in a subsequent election petition case. He was barred by the court from contesting the following general election held in 1983. In the 1983 elections, Titus Mbathi lost to Daniel Mutinda's elder brother, John Mutinda.Julius mwivithi nzuku was also on the race during this election.

== Retirement ==
Despite being free to contest the 1988 general elections, Daniel Mutinda opted not to, and has since kept away from active politics.
