= Kitui Central Constituency =

Kenyan electoral constituency

Kitui Central
- constituency for the Parliament of Kenya
- Kitui Central Constituency within Kitui County

- Kitui County within Kenya
- County: Kitui
- Population: 105,991
- Area: 422 km^{2} (162.9 sq mi)

Current constituency
- Number of members: 1
- Party: Wiper
- Member of Parliament: Makali Benson Mulu
- Wards: 5

Kitui Central Constituency is an electoral constituency in Kenya. It is one of eight constituencies in Kitui County. The constituency was established for the 1963 elections.

== Members of Parliament ==
Elections	MP	Party	Notes
1963	Eliud Ngala Mwendwa	KANU	Kenyan general election,
1969	Eliud Ngala Mwendwa	KANU	Kenyan general election, One-party system
1974	Daniel Musyoka Mutinda	KANU	Kenyan general election, One-party system
1979	Daniel Musyoka Mutinda	KANU	Kenyan general election, One-party system
1980	Titus Mbathi	KANU	By election, One-party system
1983	John Mutinda	KANU	Kenyan general election, One-party system.
1988	George Ndotto	KANU	Kenyan general election, One-party system.
1992	Charity Ngilu	DP	Kenyan general election, Multi-party system
1997	Charity Ngilu	SDP	Kenyan general election, Multi-party system
2002	Charity Ngilu	NARC	Kenyan general election, Multi-party system
2007	Charity Ngilu	NARC	Kenyan general election, Multi-party system
2013	Makali Mulu	WDM-K	Kenyan general election, Multi-party system

== Wards ==
Wards
Ward	Registered Voters	Local Authority	Kitui township / Township	19,538	Kitui municipality
Kyangwithya East	15,401	Kitui municipality			
Kyangwithya West	15,931	Kitui municipality	Miambani	11,759	Kitui county
Mulango	15,135	Kitui municipality			
Total	77,764				
*September 2025.
