= Mwingi West Constituency =

Mwingi West
- constituency
- Country: Kenya
- County: Kitui County

Mwingi West is a constituency in the eastern region of the Republic of Kenya. It is one of eight constituencies in Kitui County. The current member of the 13th Parliament of Mwingi West Constituency is Hon. Nguna, Charles Ngusya.
