= Water audit =

Method of quantifying the flows of water

A water audit (domestic/household), similar to an energy audit, is the method of quantifying all the flows of water in a system to understand its usage, reduce losses and improve water conservation. It can be performed on a large scale for a city or a state as well on a smaller scale for irrigation projects, industries, and buildings. The audit can begin with an extensive approach to generate the water balance using available data and estimates which helps in identifying specific areas to concentrate in further stages.

== History ==
Water auditing or the methodology of tracking water loss was first introduced as a concept by American Water Works Association (AWWA) in its Committee report "Revenue Producing vs. Unaccounted-for-water" in 1957. Since then many states and regional water regulatory agencies have attempted to measure water loss based upon the calculations carried out in the report but with little success. There were confusions and misunderstandings with the terminology of "unaccounted-for-water" used in the report and misleading results attained from water loss percentage calculations. In 2003, AWWA released its committee report "Applying Worldwide Best Management Practices in Water Loss Control" in which the term "unaccounted-for" was changed to "Non-Revenue" along with the percentage performance indicator.

The National Environmental Policy Act of 1970 was also a driving force leading to the development of Environmental Protection Agency (EPA) which created awareness about water conservation and efficiency. In U.K., five water companies funded the "National Leakage Initiative" which published a series of reports entitled Managing Leakage in 1994.

== Importance ==
Water loss is a critical global problem and according to the World Bank, around 45 million m^{3} of water is lost every day which accounts to over US$3 billion every year. Asia alone loses half of its distribution water due to leakages in pipes. This huge amount of water loss adds strain to governments and utilities in their funding and deprives clean water to a major population which endures water scarcity. It can save money, time and effort that goes into treatment of water up to consumable standards, installation and distribution of systems.

== Methods ==
The basic methodology of any water audit involves evaluating the source, calculating the consumption, identifying the losses and measuring the performance indicators. American Water Works Association and International Water Association have established manuals that details the steps involved in conducting a water audit and they are considered to be the gold standard in water industry. Apart from these manuals, many local and state government bodies also have their guidelines for audits according to their geographical requirements.

=== American Water Works Association: Manual of Water Supply Practices ===
American Water Works Association is a century old international nonprofit, scientific and educational association established in 1881 to improve water quality and supply. The Manual of Water Supply Practices (M36) explains the water audit methodology in a user-friendly manner and provides an overview of some of the best loss control techniques that can currently be implemented for a sustainable water loss control program. The manual provides detailed instructions on the audit process, which occurs at three levels a) top-down approach, b) component analysis, and c) bottom-up approach. For top-down approach, all water flow data are collected in order to calculate the water balance between input volume and the sum of consumption and losses. It is important to clearly identify system boundaries prior to the audit, defined by metering points at both input and output of a water system. Water balance calculation usually provides a guide as to how much water is lost as a result of customer meter inaccuracy, systematic data handling error and unauthorized consumption, as well as leakage. The manual also provides step-by-step tasks in conducting an audit and worksheets for top-down approach of the audit. Each task elaborates the process in quantifying each of the different flow of streams in a utility system. Instructions are also provided for water sources that are unmetered or have meters that are not calibrated or maintained for a long time. The numbers and data attained from available sources has to be adjusted at different levels due to various reasons including meter inaccuracies, changes in storage level and additional sources in distribution. In top-down approach, distribution water that is not accounted under billed authorized consumption are called as Non-revenue water as they do not bring revenue to utility or government or distribution company. Non-revenue water can be those that are used for fire hydrants, street cleaning, swimming pools, and water decorations. The losses in a water system can be a) apparent, due to inaccuracy in measurement of water that is successfully delivered, and b) real, due to leakage in system. The advantage of top-down approach is that it can be assembled relatively quickly and give a reasonable sense of utility's accountability status and the nature and extent of its losses. Performance indicators established in manual provide the auditors an insight to the loss standing in a particular functional area both at a broad and detailed levels. Top-down approach is the recommended starting point for utilities, homeowners and irrigation users to compile their initial water audit.

Bottom-up approach is usually costlier compared to top-down, as it involves more labor and resources involved in conducting the audit. It is mainly focused on identifying the apparent and real losses more accurately with actual field measurements. Apparent losses can be identified by analyzing billing systems to identify discrepancies, by performing meter calibration and accuracy test on random samples, and by assessing a sample of places for unauthorized consumption potential. Real losses are predominantly due to leakages which can be identified by various techniques and methods detailed in manual using bottom-up approach. The audit is usually the first step towards water conservation and the manual emphasizes on importance to act on the outcomes of audit and sustain the water loss control program.

=== International Water Association: Performance Indicators for Water Supply Systems ===
The International Water Association, a non-profit organization, released Performance Indicators for Water Supply Systems in 2000 and since then the manual has been widely used in a number of projects for water performance assessment. The manual consists of performance indicators (PI) of water supply management along with indicators for human resources, infrastructure, operations, quality of service and economics. The manual is targeted on entities such as utilities, regulatory authorities, public administration and consumers. PIs are considered as tools that help an entity to efficiently and effectively monitor a system by simplifying assessments. The indicators facilitate assessments and analysis of progress by contributing to the quantification of performance of a system over a period of time from a specific point of view. The manual provides guidelines to prioritize the indicators on four levels based on size of the system, available resources and level of details required. The indicators to monitor performance of water resources are a) Water Resource Inefficiency (%) b) Water Resource availability (%) c) Availability of own water resources (%) and d) water reused in supply (%). The manual also details the process of calculating the water balance of a system, with definitions, examples and descriptions.

== Local bodies ==
=== Texas Water Development Board (TWDB) ===
Water Loss Audit Manual for Texas Utilities was published by the TWDB in March 2008 in recognition of a House Bill enacted by the 78th Texas Legislature in 2003, requiring all utilities providing water within state of Texas to file a standardized water audit report once in five years with the TWDB. The audit methods of this manual follow the practices endorsed by American Water Works Association in its manual for water audit (M36). TWDB encourages utilities to conduct the audit every year although the House Bill only requires once every five years. The tasks involved in a top-down approach, water balance calculations and performance indicators are all same as that of M36. The manual also lists down bottom-up approach of auditing for utilities that heavily rely on estimates and lack reliable data. It also recommends using bottom-up approach to validate the preliminary water audit data attained from top-down approach. The assessment table in the manual using a 1-5 scale helps in developing a score of certainty for each data component used in the audit, with 1 being low degree of certainty and 5 being the highest. The entire water audit can be assessed similarly and provided a validation score on a scale of 85. A validation score of less than 40 is considered to be preliminary and utility companies are required to improve the accuracy of data collected. The goal of audit is to achieve a high validation score using practices listed out in both top-down and bottom-up approaches that reflects high level of confidence in the water audit results.

=== California Department of Water Resources (CDWR) ===
The Water Audit Manual prepared by the CDWR is in accordance with AWWA's M36 Manual, created in February 2016 to provide guidance to utilities and distribution systems in conducting water loss audits. The state of California passed a Senate Bill (SB No. 1420) in 2014 which requires water suppliers to submit an audit once in every five years as part of urban water management plans.

=== South Florida Water Management District ===
Water Efficiency and Self-Conducted Water Audits at Commercial and Institutional Facilities: A guide for Facility Managers is a comprehensive guide that is applicable for all users, especially in Florida, to improve water efficiency in commercial and institutional facilities. The guide provides step-by-step methodology of conducting an audit for identifying opportunities to improve water conservations in facilities such as office buildings, hospitals, hotels and motels, schools, restaurants, laundries, and car washes. Benchmarks are provided for annual water use in each of these facilities to provide a quick initial assessment of water use to the users. The audit categories are divided into Basic and Advanced, to be chosen depending upon the level of experience and expertise available in conducting the audits. The basic audit category specifies background and description, audit steps, worksheets, and post-audit guidance for different equipment and aspects inside a facility such as meters and submeters, leak detection, utility bills, kitchen water use, cooling towers, irrigation systems and rain sensors. The advanced audit procedures provide an in-depth understanding of some of the areas covered in basic audits which guides the users in identifying future water use, expenses and savings, and payback period of savings after implementing the improvements. To further improve the efficiency of water audits, guidelines are provided to a) prepare water balance of the facility, accounting for all water use from its source to all of the applications, b) create historical water use profile using bills that can point out fluctuations in water use, c) identify alternative water sources on-site for e.g., rainwater harvesting, boiler condensate and treated gray water/ waste water.

=== Ministry of Water Resources, India ===
The government of India, in 2005, released General guidelines for water audit and water conservation and circulated to all the state governments and concerned utilities, requiring them to conduct a water audit every year. An updated version of the guidelines was released in April 2017. It provides brief steps to conduct a water audit, in accordance to AWWA's M36 manual, for irrigation, domestic and industrial sectors. For domestic sector, the emphasis is on conservation of potable water and measures to identify the potential savings are provided. As part of the audit, bulk metering systems can be devised zone-wise or consumer-wise in a system to facilitate detection of water waste. A worksheet is developed to fill in details of distributed and consumed water and thereby documenting unmetered uses. The performance indicators are modified from M36 manual to meet Indian weather patterns and size of irrigation.

== Applications ==
=== Irrigation ===
Water audit is a useful tool to determine the water use efficiency in an irrigation project by accounting water losses. The clear-cut objectives of water audit applicable to irrigation systems include scope of distribution network, deliverables such as yield available and water efficiency, delivery locations/command areas and types of losses. The objective of water auditing in irrigation is to complement benchmark data in order to generate new measures and enhance performance. Table 1 below lists the various input and indicators required to evaluate the current status of an irrigation projects. It is important to perform accurate measurement of input data and choice of indicators as per audit objectives. Also, besides data validation, visual observations/remarks of the ground should be recorded to eliminate inconsistency during estimation of water use efficiency.

Input	Indicators
Reservoir inflows	Water availability in the reservoir
Canal discharge and gauges	Percentage of actual evaporation to live storage
Soil moisture measurements	Target and achievement of irrigation potential utilization
GPS for tracking water courses and outlets	Water use pattern
Design data of canal	Percentage of planned and actual non-irrigation use
Cadastral map of command area and satellite images for preparation of cadastral map	Irrigation system performance (canals), Percentage of balanced unutilized water to live storage, Conveyance efficiency of main canals, field application efficiency, scheme irrigation efficiency

Table 1: Brief Summary of Input Data and Water Audit Indicators used in Irrigation Projects

A water audit, combined with superior irrigation practices, will substantially improve or maximize benefits of irrigation systems and thereby sustain its efficiency and conserve water use. The audits along with addition of soil surfactants can improve Distribution Uniformity (DU) and result in ameliorating the soil water repellency (SWR) of an outdoor field. The irrigation audit helps to achieve a perfect irrigation system which sufficiently waters the entire field, maintains turf quality and also achieves optimum efficiency. The use of surfactants reduces surface tension at the soil-air interface and creates hydrophilic particles in order to improve water infiltration and reduce water runoff by 20%. The state of Maharashtra in India has conducted state-wide water audits on over 1200 irrigation systems every year since 2003. The number of audits on projects have steadily increased over the years from 1200 up to 2500 as of 2017 and a water audit report is published at the end of each year. The state has followed the guidelines provided by the ministry of water resources, India for conducting water audits on irrigation projects. These audits conducted on irrigation systems were able to fetch out valuable information such as water availability, water use at state level, region wise water losses, details of areas planned and actually irrigated, unutilized water from storage, percentage of evaporation, and conveyance efficiency of canals. The results show that, in 2017, 10% of water from live storage were unutilized and about 275 m^{3} of water was lost due to leakage in minor irrigation projects in Maharashtra.

=== Industrial audits ===
Water is a readily available resource and an affordable solvent for industrial use. Therefore, water audit is one of the necessary requirements to minimize its overuse and operate industries with optimum level of water consumption. The process industry especially is a complicated system with many variables and multiple co-existing contaminants. Water audit is perhaps a more effective tool to achieve water conservation and outweighs the traditionally chosen mathematical approaches like water pinch analysis. Furthermore, water audit facilitates the implementation of zero-liquid discharge and its associated steps in water minimization hierarchy. One of the pre-requisites for water audit in industries is closure content. It is defined as the threshold above which water audit is required in a pre-defined boundary system to alter the current water management practices. Closure can be calculated using the equation as (1) given below.

Closure= ((Σ〖Water Input- Σ〖Water Output〗〗)/(Σ〖Water Input〗)) <Pre-determined Tolerance eq.(1)

A water audit study was conducted in a well-renowned petroleum refinery in south of Perth, Western Australia in 2003, successfully reducing daily water consumption from 7 Mega Liters to 4 Mega Liters in a very short time frame of 7 years. The auditors chose AWWA's M36 as their basis for water audit study and divided it into two levels. The primary level audit was aimed at calculating the overall water inputs and effluent discharges with closure set at 10% and the secondary level audit was aimed at defining water usage across three main functional areas i.e. process site, utility site and other domestic usage sites. Three types of water that were monitored by the refinery data management, field studies and desktop studies were scheme water, bore water and cogeneration steam. Based on initial calculations, the non-revenue water losses were approximately 36%, thus, a closure was not obtained, and intensive audit was necessary. To overcome these losses, it was reported that site received roughly 48% of rainfall which can be utilized as an additional source of water. This proved to be a cost-effective and feasible quick fix due to the presence of aquifers which can be used as rainwater storage sites. Similarly, the secondary audit resulted in an unmet closure because of huge losses around the refinery cracking unit, increased steam consumption and faulty sensors activating car wash. Water audit proves to be a useful exercise to maximize water conservation even in a successfully operating refinery plant. Water audit ensures increased efficiency by making amendments in technical, cultural and behavioral aspects of industries. Another example of industrial audit would be the water audit was conducted on a sodium cyanide plant located in south-west Western Australia in July 2013. The water audit methodology was based on upon M36 manual prepared by American Water Works Association. As per the methodology, five flow diagrams were prepared for primary, process, utility, miscellaneous water flows, and flows to the onsite water treatment wetland. Measurements were made with flow meters wherever available and for other places using historical data, proxy data or known relationships. The auditors conducted investigations on which water inputs were directed to 'process', 'utility', and 'miscellaneous' flows, enabling them to infer the quality of water entering each unit on site without requiring water quality testing. Similar investigations were conducted on the output flows as well to determine which of the flows were contaminated by cyanide. The results of primary audit indicated a difference or imbalance between inputs and outputs of 0.7% which is considered to be very less and thus demonstrating that when flows are not metered, estimates can still be made on the basis of proxy data and known scientific relationships. This audit on an industrial process used straightforward methods to identify water imbalance and techniques to conserve water by up to 40%.

=== Water audits in buildings ===
Buildings water audits are an essential tool for owners and facility managers to increase water use efficiency and thereby reducing operating costs and increasing building occupants' comfort. A water audit was conducted from 2013-2018 by the City Energy Project, a joint initiative between the Institute of Market Transformation and the Natural Resources Defense Council (NRDC), for buildings chosen across 20 cities in the United States. The audits were conducted in accordance to local water audit guidelines (if available) and the guidelines for irrigation audits by EPA. The audits were conducted on three levels ranging from brief on-site surveys to identification of energy conservation measures to rigorous engineering analysis. A comprehensive report of a building water audit may contain information such as total annual water use, water use balance, proposed conservation measures, cost-benefit analysis, estimated cost and simple payback, and worksheets containing collected data. Potential savings from a water audit in buildings range from 20-65% for toilets, 50-100% for urinals, 20-30% for shower heads and 15-50% for dishwashers.

== Cost ==
The cost of conducting a water audit is usually a low amount when compared to financial savings gained from implementing the corrective measures identified in an audit. The payback period of savings varies according to size of the system that undergoes the audit. The cost of conducting a basic audit with "top down" approach would be between $84 and $133 to purchase the AWWA's M36 manual. There is no cost to use the AWWA's free water audit online software. The audit guidelines or methodology with worksheets can also be attained for free through various local government websites. Additional cost will be incurred by conducting a "bottom up" audit with more intense data gathering and rigorous analysis of results. The cost benefits from conducting a water audit is expected to be usually high for older systems and potentially in cold regions where distribution systems are stressed out due to severe weather conditions. A water audit conducted by the state of Tennessee in January 1988 across 278 utility companies saved $24.4 million per year at an expense of $2.7 million. The corrective measures taken by the State of Philadelphia from 2000-2011 after a water audit, saved $23 million by reducing the real and apparent losses. Water audits conducted by small utilities in the States of Virginia, California and Nova Scotia have resulted in savings ranging from $300,000 to $500,000 annually. Black & Veatch conducted a water audit for Miami Dade county's Water and Sewer Department in 2016 and the audit findings show that annual financial losses of $21,682,334 occurred due to system infrastructure and billing inefficiencies.

== See also ==
- Irrigation Association
- LEED
- WaterSense
