= Kitili Maluki Mwendwa =

2nd Chief Justice of Republic of Kenya

Kitili Maluki Mwendwa (1929 – 27 September 1985) was a former Chief Justice of Kenya. He served between 1968–1971 and was succeeded by Sir James Wicks.

Mwendwa, who was from Kitui, was the first African to become Chief Justice of Kenya. His brother, Ngala Mwendwa, served as Kenya's first Minister of Labour from 1963 to 1974.

== See also ==
- Court of Appeal of Kenya
- High Court of Kenya
