= Mwingi Central Constituency =

Electoral constituency of Kenya

Mwingi Central
- constituency for the Parliament of Kenya
- Mwingi Central Constituency within Kitui County

- Kitui County within Kenya
- County: Kitui
- Population: 108,713
- Area: 1,146 km^{2} (442.5 sq mi)

Current constituency
- Number of members: 1
- Party: Wiper
- Member of Parliament: Gedion Mutemi Mulyungi
- Wards: 6

Mwingi Central is a constituency in Kenya. It is one of eight constituencies in Kitui County and includes the former constituency of Mwingi South. Since 2017, Gideon Mutemi Mulyungi has represented the constituency in the National Assembly.
