= Kalonzo Musyoka =

10th Vice President of Kenya

His Excellency H.E. Dr. Stephen Kalonzo Musyoka E.G.H.
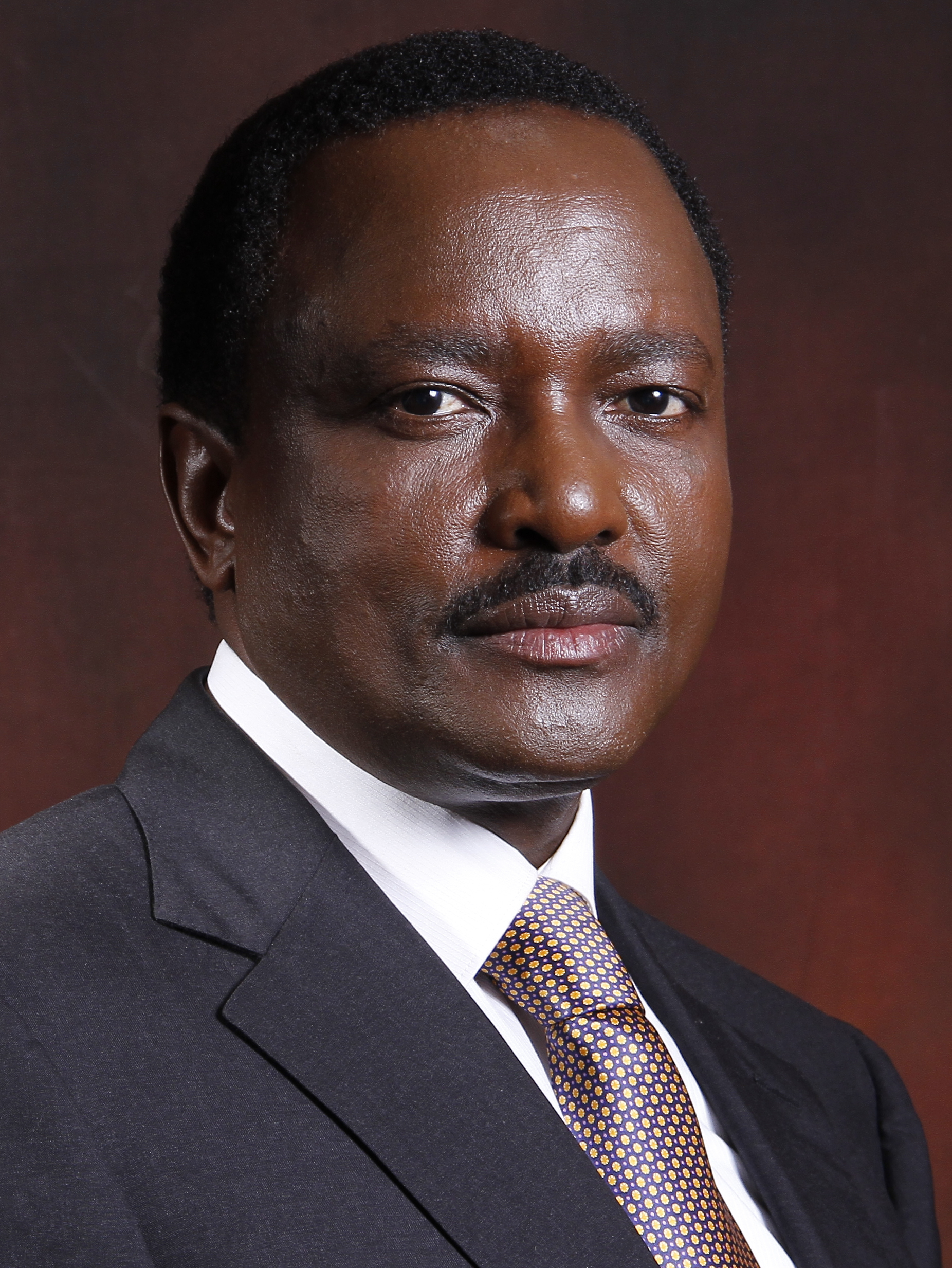

10th Vice President of Kenya
- In office 9 January 2008 – 9 April 2013
- President: Mwai Kibaki
- Prime Minister: Raila Odinga
- Preceded by: Moody Awori
- Succeeded by: William Ruto (Deputy President)

Minister for Home Affairs
- In office 9 January 2008 – 9 April 2013
- President: Mwai Kibaki

Minister of Environment and Natural Resources
- In office 23 August 2004 – 7 September 2005
- President: Mwai Kibaki
- Succeeded by: Kivutha Kibwana

Minister of Foreign Affairs
- In office 1 January 2003 – 14 August 2004
- President: Mwai Kibaki
- Preceded by: Marsden Madoka
- Succeeded by: Chirau Ali Mwakwere

Minister of Tourism and Information
- In office 6 February 2001 – 30 November 2002
- President: Daniel Arap Moi
- Preceded by: Nicholas Biwott
- Succeeded by: Raphael Tuju

Minister of Education and Human Resource Development
- In office 6 October 1998 – 6 March 2001
- President: Daniel Arap Moi
- Preceded by: Joseph Kamotho

Minister of Foreign Affairs and International Relations
- In office 8 June 1993 – 1 July 1998
- President: Daniel arap Moi
- Preceded by: Wilson Ndolo Ayah
- Succeeded by: Bonaya Godana

Deputy Speaker of the National Assembly
- In office 7 January 1988 – 7 January 1992
- President: Daniel arap Moi

KANU National Organising Secretary
- In office 1 February 1988 – 20 July 2004
- President: Daniel Toroitich arap Moi

Assistant Minister for Works, Housing and Physical Planning
- In office 5 May 1986 – 1 January 1988
- President: Daniel Toroitich arap Moi

Member of the Kenyan Parliament
- In office 6 July 1985 – 28 March 2013
- Preceded by: Philip Manandu
- Succeeded by: John Munuve
- Constituency: Kitui North (1985–1997); Mwingi North (1997–2013)

Personal details
- Born: Stephen Kalonzo Musyoka; 24 December 1953 (age 72) Tseikuru, Kenya
- Party: WPF
- Spouse: Pauline Musyoka
- Children: 4
- Education: University of Nairobi (LL.B); Kenya School of Law (PgDL); Mediterranean Institute of Management (PgDBM)
- Profession: Lawyer
- Positions: Patron, K. Musyoka Foundation; Chief Commissioner, KSA
- Website: www.kalonzomusyoka.co.ke

Stephen Kalonzo Musyoka (born 24 December 1953) is a Kenyan politician who was the tenth Vice-President of Kenya from 2008 to 2013. Musyoka served in the government under the late President Daniel arap Moi as the Secretary of Kenya African National Union party (1980–1988), Assistant Minister for Works (1986-1988), Deputy Speaker of the National Assembly (1988–1992), Minister for Foreign Affairs from 1993 until 1998, Minister of Education (1998–2001); and subsequently, under the late President Mwai Kibaki, he was Minister of Foreign Affairs again from 2003 to 2004, then Minister of the Environment from 2004 to 2005. He was an unsuccessful candidate in the 2007 presidential election, after which he was appointed vice-president by Kibaki in January 2008.

Kalonzo Musyoka is the party leader of the Wiper Democratic Movement (formerly Orange Democratic Movement-Kenya). He also serves as Chief Commissioner for The Kenya Scouts Association.

In mid-2025, under his leadership, his long-standing party formerly known as the Wiper Democratic Movement–Kenya (WDM) officially changed its name to the Wiper Patriotic Front (WPF). Kalonzo stated that the rebranding was intended to reflect the changing political mood among Kenyan youth and a shift toward a broader national outlook ahead of the 2027 general election.

== Early life and education ==
He was born in Tseikuru, a remote part of Kitui District in British Kenya's then Southern Province. Between 1960 and 1967, he studied at Tseikuru Full Primary School to attain basic education. He then attended Kitui High School in Kitui for the ordinary level and later joined Meru School in Meru, where he graduated at the advanced level in 1973. Kalonzo Musyoka graduated with a Bachelor of Law degree from the University of Nairobi in 1977. He continued further studies at the Kenya School of Law in 1978 where he was awarded a Post graduate diploma in Law. In 1979, he attended the Mediterranean Institute of Management in Cyprus where he earned a post graduate Diploma in Business.

In 2009, he was awarded an honorary doctorate in divinity among other 17 beneficiaries at the Charter hall in Nairobi. This was one of the "honorary professorships and doctorate degrees" that were issued by Professor Clyde Rivers, the International Commissioner of the Latin University of Theology, based in Inglewood, California.
On 19 December 2008, Kalonzo Musyoka was honoured with a Doctorate in Humane Letters (honoris causa) in recognition of his achievements in peace making, conflict resolution efforts, sustainable community development and humanistic ideals by Kenyatta University during its 25th graduation. In 2016, he was named African Dignitary Man of the Year.

== Political career ==
Musyoka vied for the Kitui North Constituency parliamentary seat in 1983, but was defeated. At that time, Kenya was one-party state and the only party fielding candidates was Kenya African National Union (KANU). However, only two years later, in 1985 the Kitui North seat was vacated and Musyoka won subsequent by-elections, thus becoming an MP at the age of 32. In 1986 he was appointed Assistant Minister for Works, Housing and Physical Planning, serving until 1988. He was re-elected at the 1988 parliamentary elections and served as Deputy Speaker of the National assembly from 1988 to 1992. He was also KANU's National Organizing Secretary from 1988 to 2002.

=== 1992–1997 Kenyan Parliament ===
Kenya's first multiparty elections were held in 1992. Musyoka stayed in KANU, renewed his parliamentary position and was appointed as the Minister for Foreign Affairs and International Cooperation. He also held couple of other ministerial positions while part of the KANU government. In June 1993, he addressed the World Conference on Human Rights in Austria which was the first human rights conference held since the end of the Cold War. He termed the illicit mineral trade which fuels and finances what he called 'the cause of incessant conflicts, environmental degradation but ultimately and sadly too, poverty'. The Vienna Declaration and Programme of Action was the major result from this meeting after the participants reached a consensus.

=== 1997–2002 Kenyan Parliament ===
He was again elected to the parliament at the 1997 elections, but now from Mwingi North Constituency, since his former constituency Kitui North was split into new constituencies.

=== 2002–2007 Kenyan Parliament ===
In the months leading up to the 2002 general election, under the leadership of then KANU secretary general, Raila Odinga, he decamped from KANU to join the Liberal Democratic Party (LDP) as a founding member under the banner of the National Rainbow Coalition, which went on to win the general elections.

On 1 December 2003, as the Minister for home affairs and international co-operation for Kenya, he welcomed the people to this meeting, whose theme was Strengthening the role of IGAD in regional peace initiatives and post conflict reconstruction on behalf of the republic of Kenya and thanked the Danish government, IGAD Secretariat and the ISS on behalf of the IGAD Member States for their preparations and funding of the meeting. Kalonzo Musyoka was involved in the Sudan peace process between 1993 and 1997 and he was part of the team that reconstituted the draft establishing IGAD in 1995.

Musyoka became Minister for Foreign Affairs for a second time under President Mwai Kibaki, but in a cabinet reshuffle on 30 June 2004 he was moved to the post of Minister for Environment. In late August 2004, he was additionally removed from his position as chairman of the Sudanese and Somali peace talks and was replaced by John Koech. Musyoka was reportedly unhappy with President Kibaki's refusal to honour a pre-election Memorandum of understanding (MOU) which they had signed with the president's party NAK. He was one of the leaders of the successful "No"-campaign in the November 2005 referendum on the proposed new constitution. Following the referendum, he was dismissed from the Cabinet.

Subsequently, Kalonzo Musyoka decamped Liberal Democratic Party (LDP) into the little-known Labor Party of Kenya.

Kalonzo Musyoka was widely expected to vie for the presidency in the December 2007 election. Musyoka campaigned for the ODM-Kenya ticket, facing a number of other contenders. His rating for December 2007 election steadily dropped, and political analysts wondered whether he would make a significant impact. His relationship with fellow ODM-Kenya leader Raila Odinga, who was also after the ODM-Kenya presidential ticket, was the subject of much speculation. Many observers questioned whether the presidential hopefuls of ODM-Kenya, particularly Raila and Musyoka, could unite to support one common candidate for the general election.

The ODM-Kenya split into two factions, one gathered around Musyoka and the other around Odinga, in August 2007. Musyoka was elected by his faction as its presidential candidate on 31 August 2007, receiving 2,835 votes in a secret ballot against Julia Ojiambo, who received 791 votes.

Musyoka has been quoted as saying "... the war against poverty could not be won unless environmental issues were addressed."

Musyoka launched his presidential campaign at Uhuru Park in Nairobi on 14 October 2007. This move was criticised by those who saw him as a traitor to the ODM party of Raila Odinga. December 2007 polls put Odinga ahead and Kibaki following closely, Kalonzo however said that "atapitia katikati" (passing between two people).

=== After 2007 ===
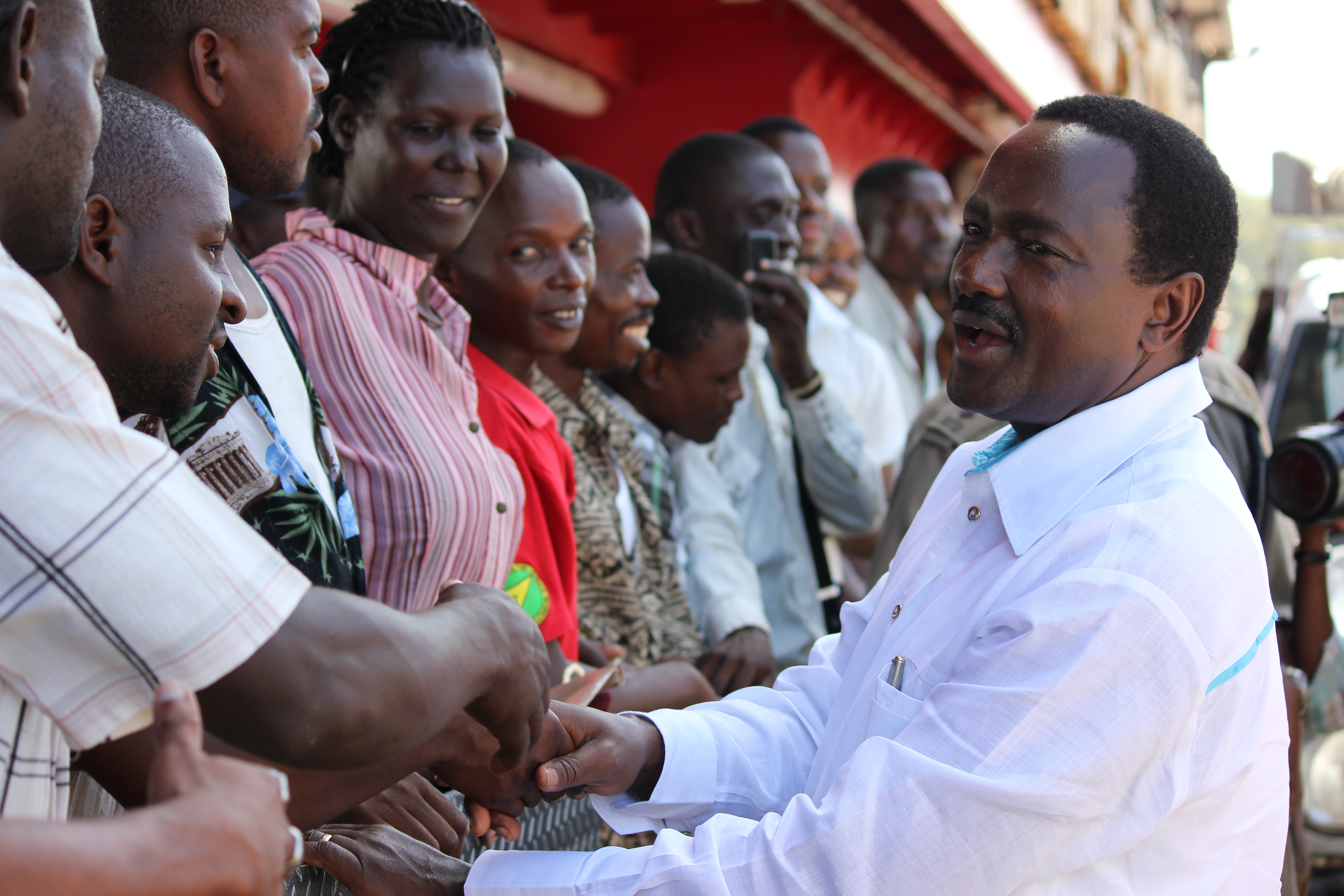
Musyoka greeting people in Mombasa

According to official results, Musyoka placed a distant third behind Kibaki and Odinga with 9% of the vote. Amid a violent crisis over the results, with supporters of Odinga disputing the outcome, Kibaki appointed Musyoka as vice-president and Minister of Home Affairs on 8 January 2008. Musyoka expressed gratitude to Kibaki and, referring to the ongoing dispute and violence, said that he was "intensely aware that the appointment has come at a difficult time when our nation is going through a painful moment". He took office as vice-president on 9 January.

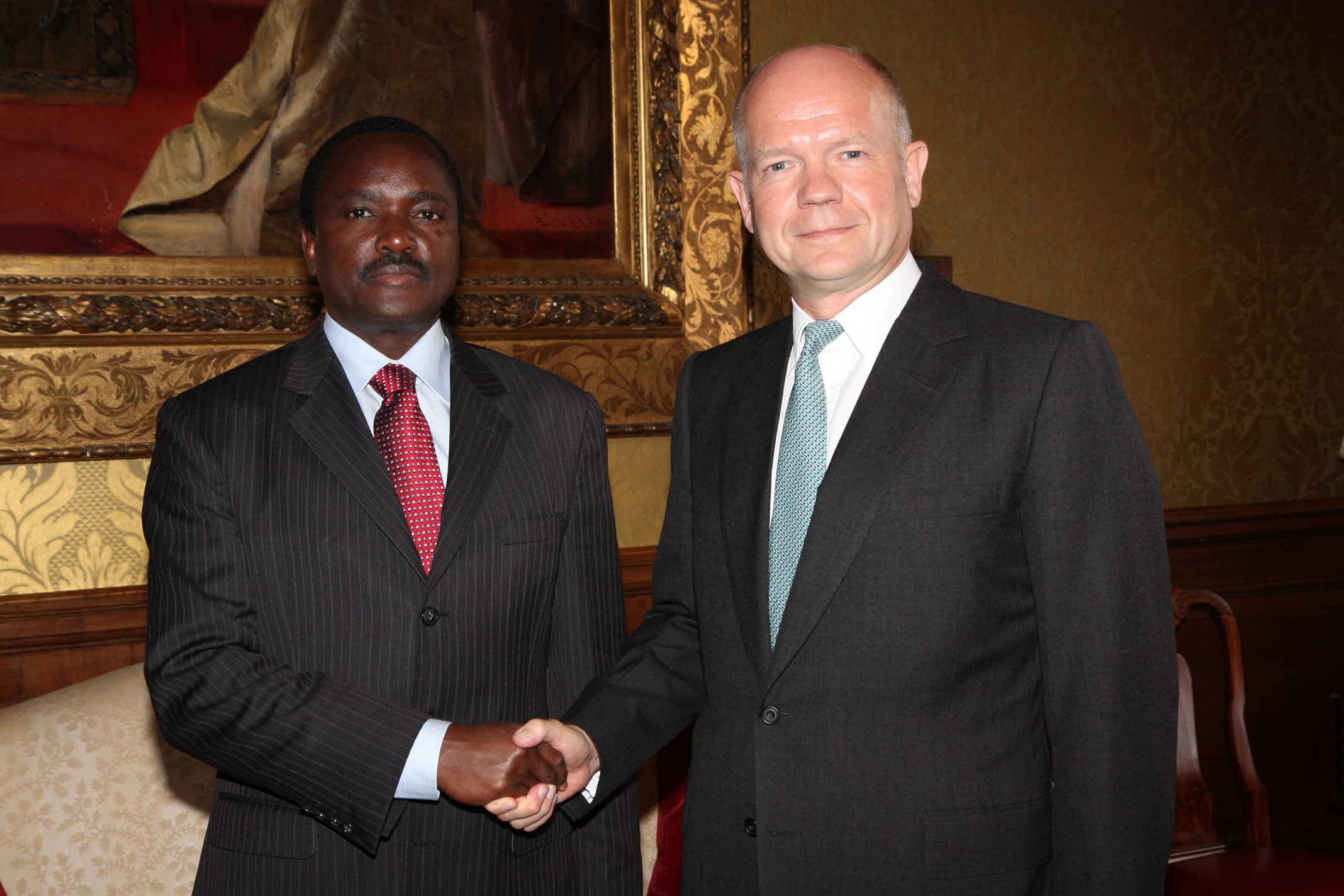
Vice President Kalonzo Musyoka meeting the British Foreign Secretary William Hague in London, 29 August 2012

The political crisis eventually led to the signing of a power-sharing agreement between Kibaki and Odinga. In the Grand Coalition Cabinet that was announced on 13 April 2008, Musyoka remained vice-president and Minister of Home Affairs.

In 2010 Musyoka supported the draft constitution in the campaign for 4 August referendum but Members of the campaign team opposing the draft constitution claimed that he was secretly opposing the draft leading to a satirical comparison of Musyoka to a watermelon which is naturally green outside and red inside, the team supporting the draft constitution was represented by color green while the team opposing the draft constitution was represented by the color red hence the "green team" and the "red team", Musyoka's nickname watermelon was because of his alleged open support for the green team and secret support for the red team. Most of the opposition of the draft constitution were the clergy.

=== 2013 Elections ===
In the race for the 4th president of Kenya, Kalonzo Musyoka joined his longtime political opponent Raila Odinga to form the Coalition for Reforms and Democracy (CORD) with Musyoka shelving his presidential ambition to run as Odinga's running mate.

When the first round of the presidential election took place on 4 March 2013, Uhuru Kenyatta was declared the president-elect of Kenya by the Independent Electoral and Boundaries Commission. Raila Odinga challenged this in the Supreme Court of Kenya. Questions were raised why Musyoka was not a petitioner in the case.

After the Supreme Court dismissed the CORD Petition, he left office when the President-elect, Uhuru Kenyatta, was sworn in.

=== 2017 Elections ===
For the 2017 general election, Musyoka once again joined Raila Odinga to form the National Super Alliance to oppose president Kenyatta and deputy president William Ruto. Musyoka then ran under Odinga as his running mate.

=== 2022 Elections ===
In the 2022 elections, Musyoka announced that he would vie for presidency; he however dropped his presidential bid and supported Azimio la Umoja candidate Raila Odinga.

After the August 2022 election, analysts observed that Kalonzo, who maintained strong political support in the Ukambani region, emerged as one of the main voices of the opposition to President William Ruto’s administration, especially on economic and social policy matters. His standing in the Kamba-dominated region and attempts to broaden his national appeal were pointed out in a 2022–2023 profile.

== Other responsibilities ==
Dr Kalonzo Musyoka has, since 10 June 2013, served as the University Chancellor of the Uganda Technology and Management University (UTAMU), a privately owned university in Uganda, based in Kampala, that country's capital and largest city.

In July 2019, Dr Kalonzo Musyoka was appointed by President Uhuru Kenyatta as a special envoy to the republic of South Sudan. In February 2020, he was able to broker a peace deal in South Sudan between President Salva Kiir and former rebel leader Riek Machar. The deal saw the two form a unity government.

== Personal life ==
Kalonzo Musyoka is married to his wife Pauline. They have four children. He is a baptised and devout Christian. He is the patron of the Kalonzo Musyoka Foundation and he has served since 2006.

Political offices
Preceded by Moody Awori	Vice-President of Kenya; 2008–2013	Succeeded by William Ruto
