= Mwingi =

- Town
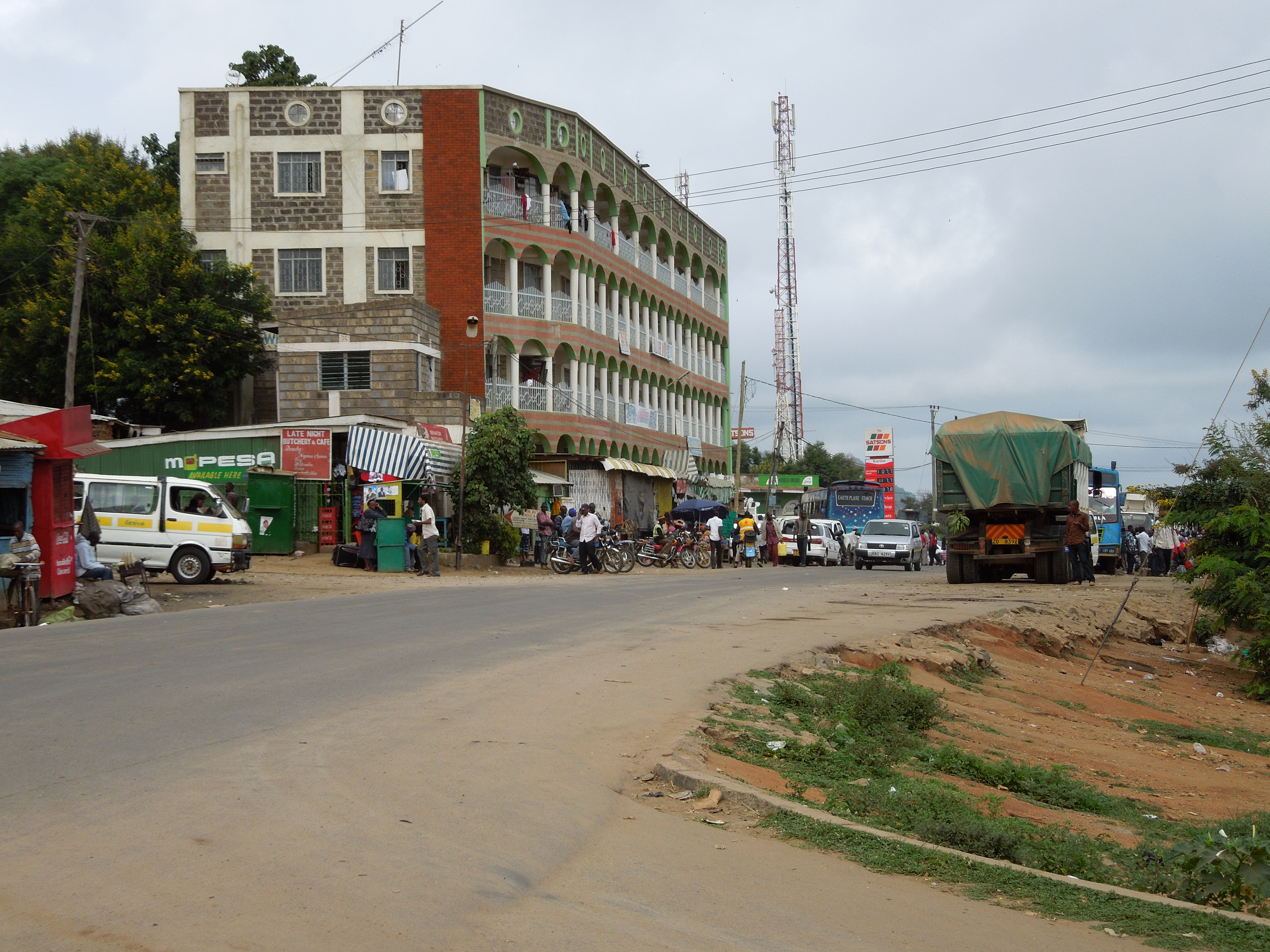
- Mwingi Main Road

- Location within Kenya
- Coordinates: 0°56′S 38°03′E
- Country: Kenya
- County: Kitui County

Population (2009)
  - Total: 15,970
- Time zone: UTC+3 (EAT)

Mwingi is a town in Kitui County in the Eastern Region of the Republic of Kenya. It had an urban population of 15,970 as per the 2009 census. The town is located along the A3 Road between Nairobi and Garissa, 47 kilometres (29 mi) north of its county capital Kitui, and 200 kilometres (120 mi) east of the capital city of Nairobi. It was the capital of the former Mwingi District.

Mwingi is home to former Kenya's Vice President (2007–2013) Stephen Kalonzo Musyoka. Major schools include St. Joseph's Junior Seminary, Mwingi Boys, Migwani Boys, Kimangao Girls, Thitani Girls, Kyuso Boys and Kyome Boys spread across the entire Mwingi region that includes the sub counties of Central, Mwingi East, Migwani, Kyuso, Mumoni, and Tseikuru.

== Gallery ==
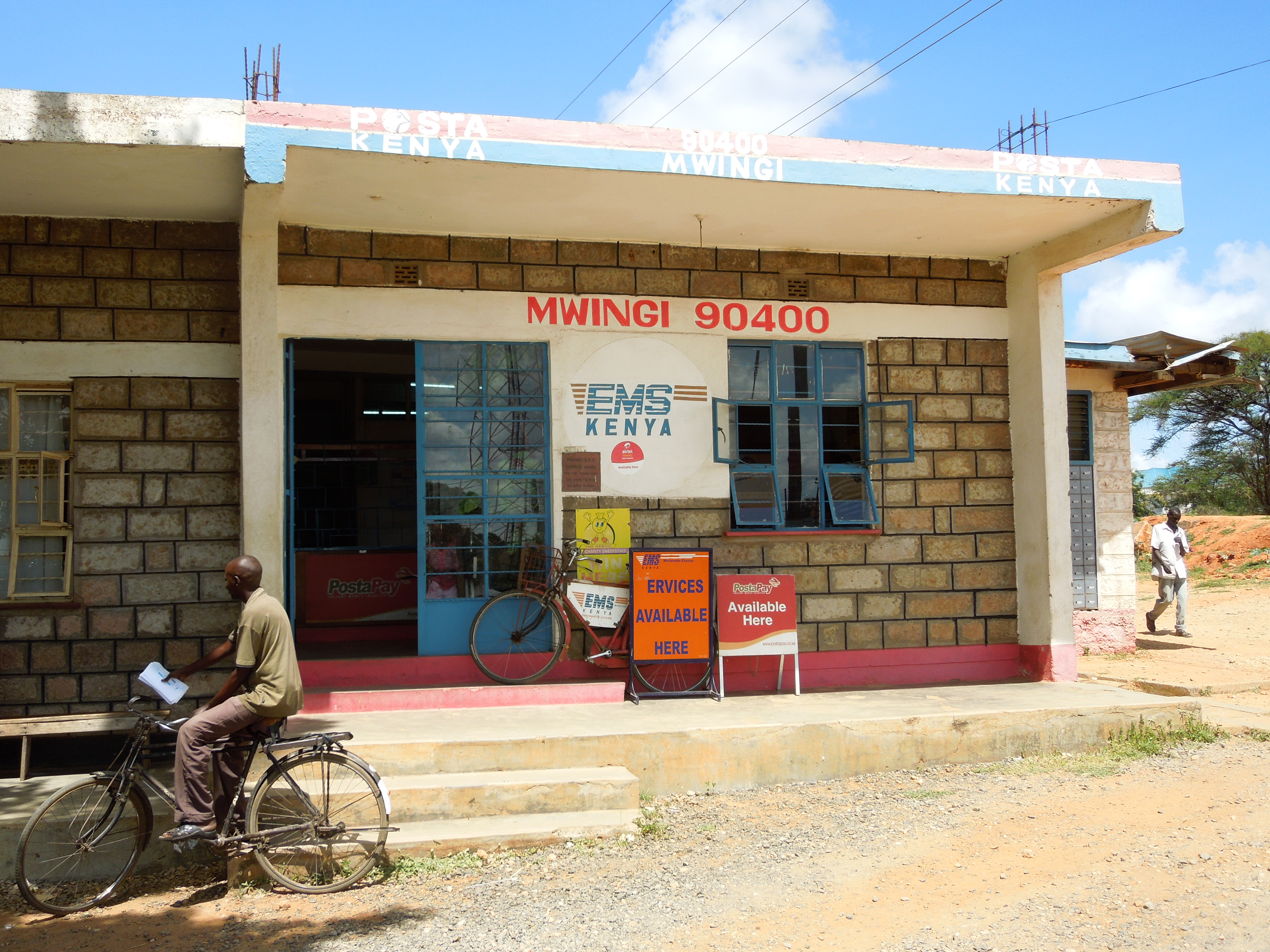
Mwingi post office

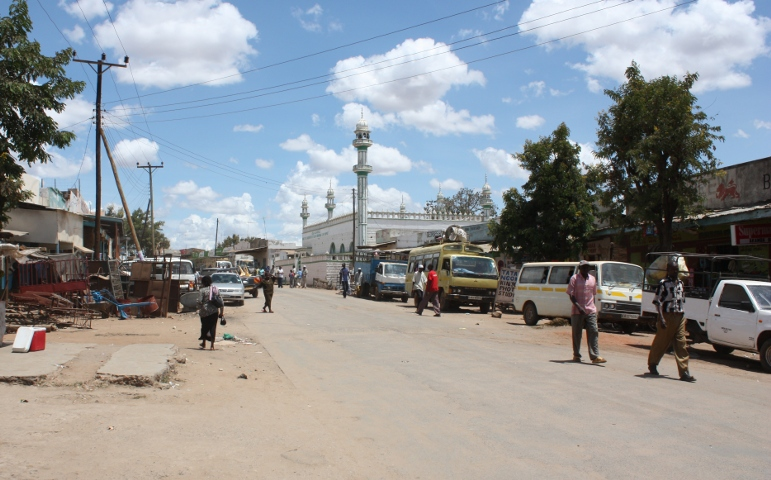
Street scene

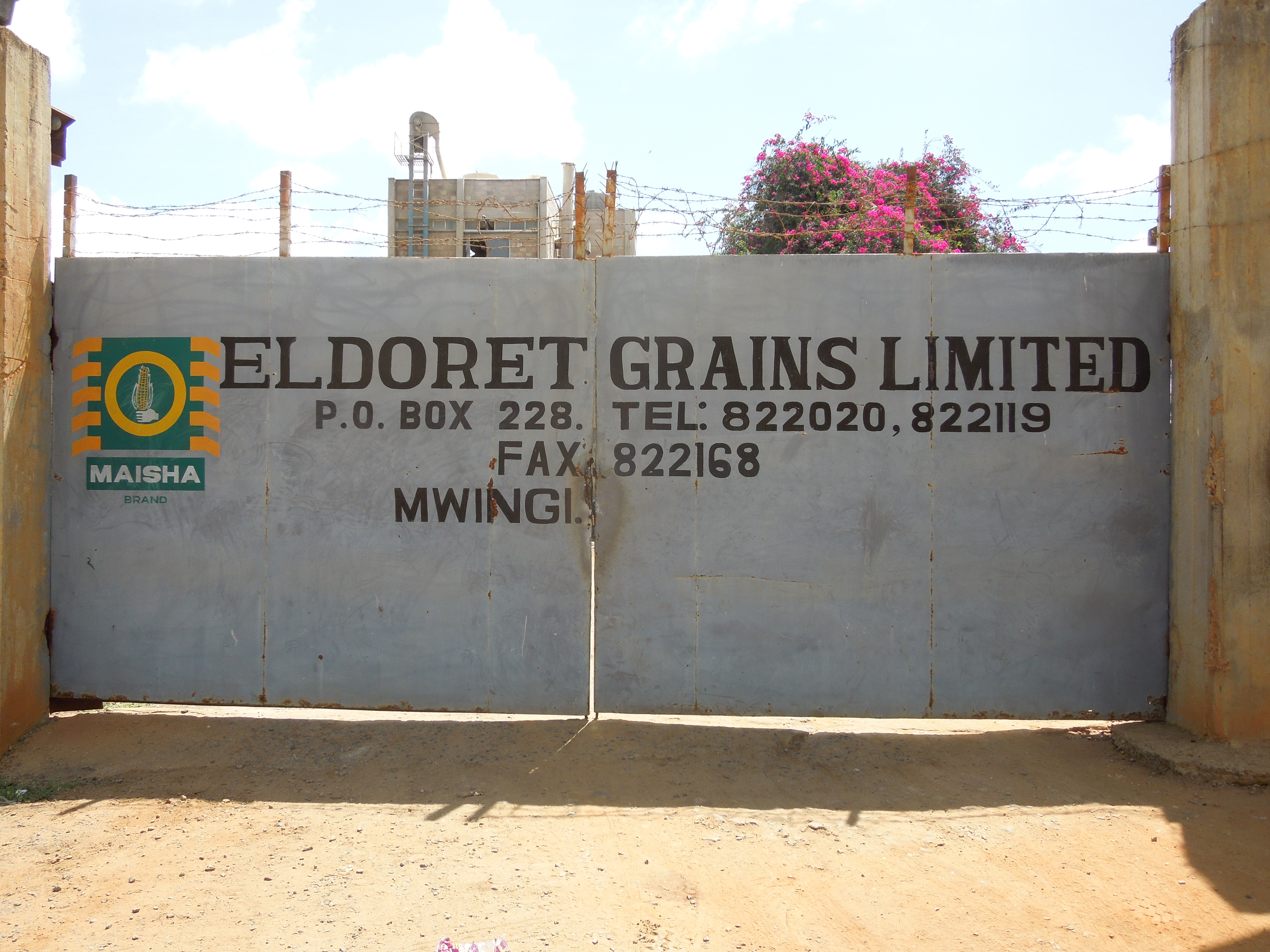
Grain factory

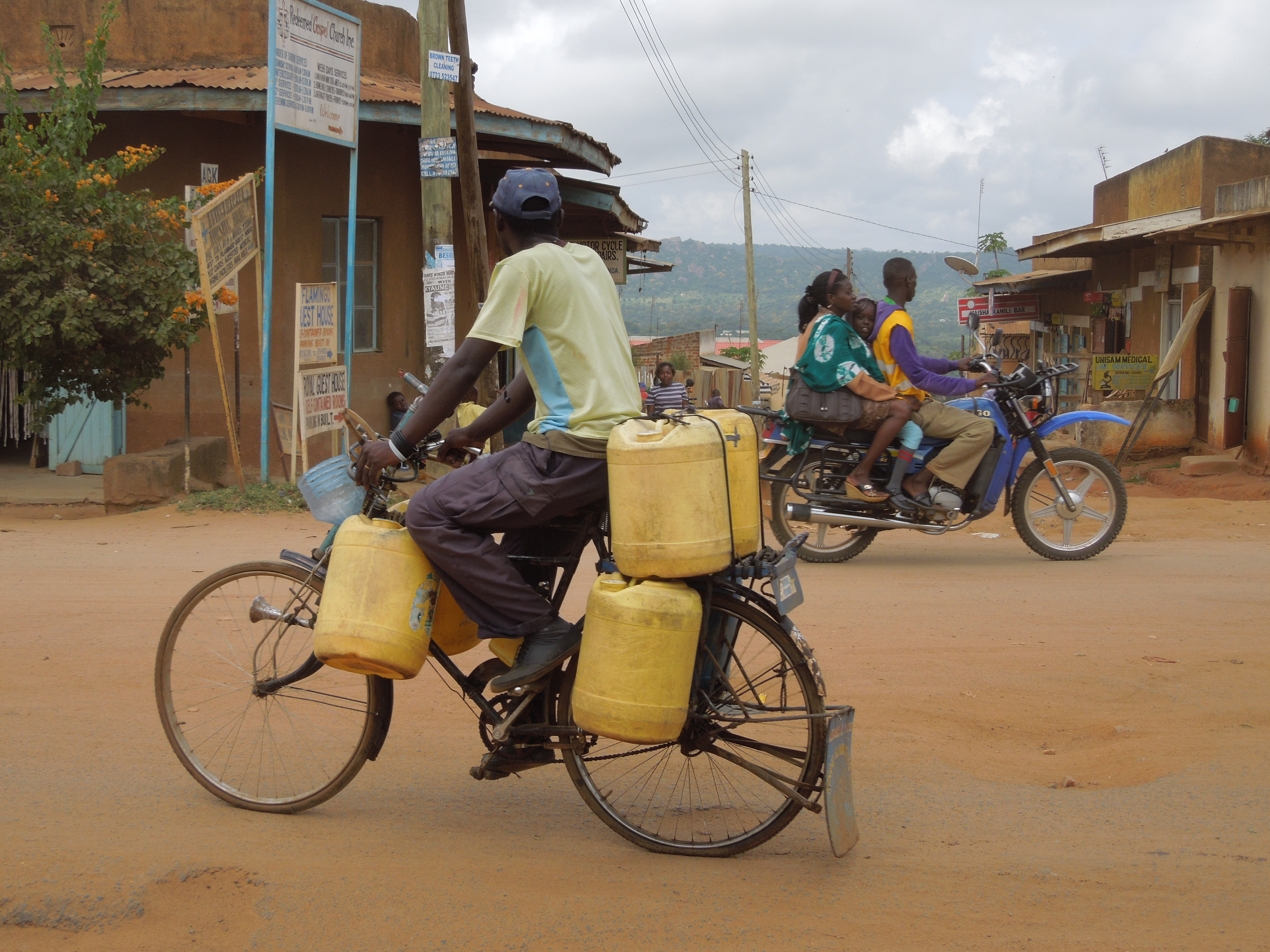
Local traffic

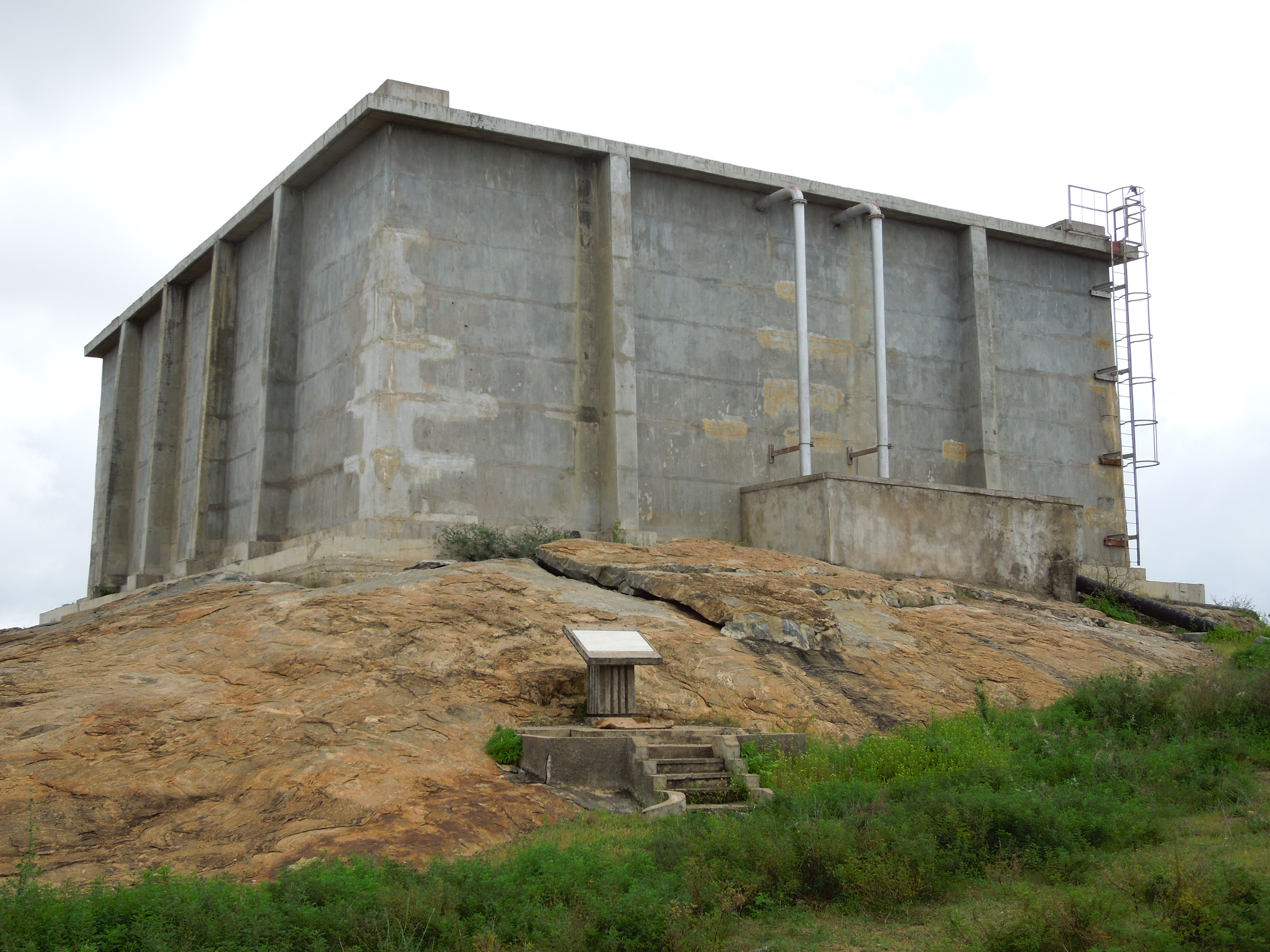
Water supply

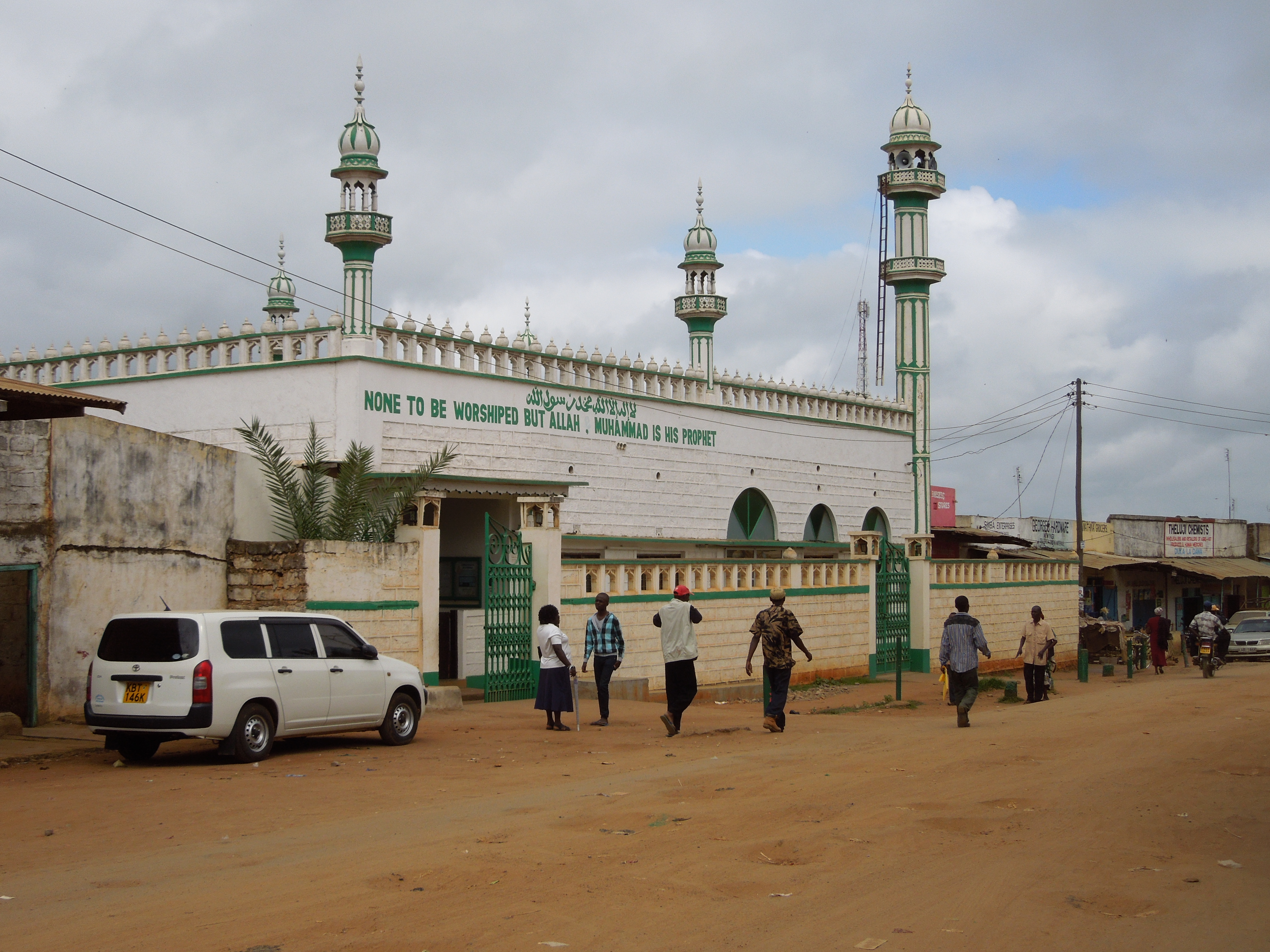
Mosque
