= Kitui =

- Municipality
- Location within Kenya
- Coordinates: 1°22′S 38°01′E
- Country: Kenya
- County: Kitui County

Population (2019)
  - Total: 29,062
- Time zone: UTC+3 (EAT)

Kitui is a town and capital of Kitui County in Kenya, 185 kilometres east of Nairobi and 105 kilometres east of Machakos. it covers an area approximately 30,496.4 km squares and lies between latitudes 0°10 South and 3°0 South and longitudes 37°50 East and 39°0 East. It borders seven counties i.e. Machakos and Makueni counties to the west, Tana River County to the east and south-east, Taita Taveta County to the south, Embu to the north-west, and Tharaka-Nithi and Meru counties to the north. Kitui became the headquarters of Kitui County after the adoption of the new constitution and coming into effect of devolved governments.

== Overview ==
The name Kitui means ‘a place where iron goods are made’ in Kamba. The Kamba iron-smiths who settled in the county many years before the colonial period are the ones who named the area Kitui. Kitui had a population of 155,896 in 2009 making it the 12th largest urban centre in Kenya in terms of population. It is the largest urban centre in the county followed by Mwingi. A large majority of the residents belong to the Kamba, a Bantu people.

== Education ==
The major secondary schools around Kitui town are St. Charles Lwanga High School, Kitui School, Mulango Girls' High School, St. Angela's High School, St. Ursula Tungutu Girls Secondary School, Chuluni Girls' Secondary School, Matinyani Secondary School and St. Aquinas Kalawa Boys' Secondary School. The major public primary schools in Kitui town include Central Primary School, Muslim Primary School, Manyenyoni primary school, Kaveta Primary School, Kalawa Primary School, Ngiini Primary School, Kwa Ngindu Primary School among others. There are also several private schools in the Kitui town.

== Higher education ==
Kitui County is home to several Universities and Colleges.

- South Eastern Kenya University (SEKU) – The university is a fully fledged University and is the successor to the South Eastern University College (SEUCO) which was a Constituent College of the University of Nairobi.
- Kenya Medical Training College(KMTC)
- Kenyatta University Kitui Campus
