= Bomet Constituency =

Kenyan electoral constituency

Bomet Constituency was a former electoral constituency in the Rift Valley Province of Kenya. It was divided into Bomet East Constituency and Bomet Central Constituency.

== Members of Parliament ==
Elections	MP	Party	Notes
1963	Alfred K. arap Soi	KADU	
1969	Joseph K. arap Chumo	KANU	One-party system
1974	Isaac Kipkorir Salat	KANU	One-party system
1979	Isaac Kipkorir Salat	KANU	One-party system
1983	Isaac Kipkorir Salat	KANU	One-party system.
1988	Kipkalya Kones	KANU	One-party system.
1992	Kipkalya Kones	KANU	
1997	Kipkalya Kones	KANU	
2002	Nicholas Kiptoo Korir Salat	KANU	
2007	Kipkalya Kones	ODM	Kones died in an air accident in June 2008
2008	Beatrice Kones	ODM	By-election
Dissolved into Bomet East and Bomet Central

== Members of Parliament ==
Elections	MP	Party	Notes
2013	Ronald Tonui	URP	
2013	Paul Bii	URP	
2013	Joyce Laboso	URP	
2013	Bernard Bett	URP	
2013	Sammy Koech		

== Wards ==
Wards
Ward	Representative	Constituency
Kipreres	Philip Korir	Bomet East
Longisa	Davis Kipkirui	Bomet East
Chemaner	Alice Chesang	Bomet East
Kembu	Joseph Kellong	Bomet East
Merigi	Zaddock Kilel	Bomet East
Mutarakwa	Robert Langat	Bomet Central
Silibwet Township	Haron Kirui	Bomet Central
Singorwet	Alfred Langat	Bomet Central
Chesoen	Kipngetich Barchok	Bomet Central
Ndaraweta	Josphat Kirui	Bomet Central
Nyangores	Andrew Maritim	Chepalungu
Kongasis	Wesley Bett	Chepalungu
Chebunyo	Joseah Chepkwony	Chepalungu
Sigor	Robert Rono	Chepalungu
Siongiroi	Leonard Kirui	Chepalungu
Kipsonoi	Weldon Tula Kirui	Sotik
Kapletundo	Richard Busolo Chirchir	Sotik
Ndanai	David Maritim	Sotik
Chemagel	Augustine Koskei	Sotik
Rongena	Samuel Keter	Sotik
Chepchapas	Wesley Kiprotich	Konoin
Kimulot	Clara Cherotich	Konoin
Boito	Charles Nyesha Langat	Konoin
Embomos	Robert Serbai	Konoin
Mogogosiek	Ambrose Koech	Konoin
