= Belgut Constituency =

Kenyan electoral constituency

Belgut
- constituency for the Parliament of Kenya
- Belgut Constituency within Kericho County

- Kericho County within Kenya
- County: Kericho
- Population: 145,072
- Area: 264 km^{2} (101.9 sq mi)

Current constituency
- Number of members: 1
- Party: UDA
- Member of Parliament: Nelson Koech
- Wards: 5

Belgut is an electoral constituency in Kenya. It is one of six constituencies of Kericho County. The constituency was established for the 1963 elections. A new Constituency Sigowet-Soin was curved out of this Constituency in 2013 after the promulgation of the new constitution (2010).

It spans the area that lies between the Kericho Kisumu highway to the East and the Chemosit (Sondu Miriu) River to the west. It occupies the land mass between Kericho, Sondu and Kabianga towns. Its headquarters is Sosiot Town.

Its main economic activity is tea farming, with the constituency being host to Tegat and Momul tea factories. Other activities include dairy, maize, vegetable farming. On its lower side towards Sigowet–Soin Constituency, sugar farming has taken root recently.

== Members of Parliament ==
Elections	MP	Party	Notes
1963	Alfred Kiprato Kerich	KADU	
1969	Wesley K. Rono	KANU	One-party system
1974	Alfred Kiprato Kerich	KANU	One-party system
1979	Ayub arap Chepkwony	KANU	One-party system
1983	Kiptarus arap Kirior	KANU	One-party system.
1988	Ayub arap Chepkwony	KANU	One-party system.
1992	Kiptarus arap Kirior	KANU	
1997	Charles D. K. arap Kirui	KANU	
2002	Charles Cheruiyot Keter	KANU	
2007	Charles Cheruiyot Keter	ODM	
2013	Erick Mlimani Keter	KANU	
2017	Nelson Sonko Koech	JP	
2022	Nelson Sonko Koech	UDA	

== Locations and wards ==
Locations
Location	Population*
Kapsuser	15,000
Chaik	27,870
Chemamul	15,051
Kabianga	15,909
Kaplelartet	15241
Kebeneti	22,096
Kiptere	20,692
Seretut	18,283
Waldai	41,616
Total	x
1999 census.

Wards
Ward	Registered Voters	Local Authority
Cheptororiet	3,162	Kericho municipality
Kapsuser	2,517	Kericho municipality
Kipkoiyan	3,934	Kericho municipality
Chaik	8,691	Kipsigis county
Chemamul	5,588	Kipsigis county
Kabianga	5,895	Kipsigis county
Kaplelatet	4,553	Kipsigis county
Kebeneti	6,867	Kipsigis county
Kiptere	7,091	Kipsigis county
Seretut	2,549	Kipsigis county
Waldai	9,260	Kipsigis county
Total	60,107	
*September 2005.

== Political history ==
Belgut in early 1963 comprised the current Ainamoi, Belgut and Sigowet-Soin.

The journey started in 1963 where Alfred Kiptaro Kerich, who hailed from Kaptebeswet in the current Belgut, was elected unopposed.

=== 1963-1969 ===
Alfred Kiptaro Kerich ( First Belgut MP used to work as a court clerk at Kericho Law Courts. Studied up to Class 8)

=== 1969–1974 ===
Contestants in that election of 1969 were:

1. Alfred Kiptaro Kerich (was defending his seat)
2. Wesley K. Rono (A graduate of University of Nairobi and the then Cheptenye Boys Principal)
3. Ayub Chepkwony (A new entrant to Belgut Politics from Chepkolon area in the current Belgut. He used to Work with Voice of Kenya (VOK Kalenjin Service and also worked with Kenya Police)

In that election of 1969 Alfred Kiptaro Kerich lost to Wesley K. Rono.

=== 1974–1979 ===
Contestants in that election of 1974 were:-

1. Alfred Kiptaro Kerich (Seeking re-election after losing the previous election to Wesley K. Rono)
2. Ayub Chepkwony (was still seeking the seat after losing 1969 polls)
3. Wesley K. Rono (was defending his seat )
4. Benjamin (new entrant, was from somewhere in Chemamul)

By then Kiptarus Kirior, who later became the Member of Parliament for Belgut, was the councillor for Soin Ward and serving at the same time as the H/T Kipsitet Primary.

In that election of 1974 Alfred Kerich managed to clinch the seat from Wesley K. Rono (Alfred Kiptaro Kerich had claimed earlier that this guy won't perform and true to his words people agreed that he didn't really perform to the expectation of many.

=== 1979–1983 ===
Contestants in that election of 1979 were:

1. Ayub Chepkwony(Seeking again for the third time)
2. Kiptarus Kirior (new entrant to the MP politics after serving as councillor for Soin Ward)
3. Frank Ruto (A new entrant to the politics of Belgut and a former employee of Kenya Breweries;a Bsc graduate of University of Nairobi. He worked with Henry Kosgei where Kosgei was the General Manager. He resigned from that position the same year to go and vie for the seat of MP, Tindiret Constituency.
4. Alfred Kiptaro Kerich (Defending his seat)
5. Martha Maseti (From Kapsuser and the first woman to vie for the seat of MP in Belgut)

In that election of 1979 Ayub Chepkwony won after seeking the seat for three times and was made Assistant Minister in Moi's Govt of 1979 to 1983. Kiptarus Kirior came a strong second place.

=== 1983–1988 ===
Contestants for that election of 1983 were:

1. Frank Ruto (Seeking for the second time)
2. Kiptarus Kirior (Seeking for the second time)
3. Wesley Ruto (Ndovu) (New entrant to Belgut Politics and the then Deputy Principal Sosiot Girls)
4. Ayub Chepkwony (was defending his seat)

In that election of 1983 Kiptarus Kirior won.

=== 1988–1992 ===
Contestants in that election of 1988 were:

1. Ayub Chepkwony (seeking re-election after losing to Kirior in the previous election of 1983)
2. Kiptarus Kirior (Defending to retain his seat)
3. Wesley Ruto (Ndovu) (Used to sell his votes the last minute to the strongest candidate)
4. Frank Ruto (seeking for the third time. The famous Kap Frank in Kiptere is his home.

In that election of 1988 Ayub Chepkwony won. This election was marred with a lot of irregularities Ayub used violence to take the seat since it was the Mlolongo System and Kirior lost that way and on that process Mr. Timothy Sirma ( the then District Commissioner and also the Returning Officer for the 1988 Belgut Parliamentary Elections ) bite Kirior's finger. Kiptarus Arap Kirior filed a petition against Ayub Chepkwony challenging his election as Member of Parliament for Belgut Constituency under Kenya Gazette Notice: 1848 in the year 1988. Remember DCs at time were the Returning Officers across Kenya. (Moi was also funny 3/4 of the DCs were Kalenjins)

=== 1992–1997 ===
Contestants for that election of 1992 were:-

1. Charles Kirui DK ( new entrant to the politics of Belgut, a finance expert)
2. Ayub Chepkwony (defending his seat in the election of 1992)
3. Kiptarus Kirior (seeking the seat again after losing to Ayub Chepkwony in the previous election of 1988)
4. Wesley Ruto ( Ndovu) (seeking for the third time)

In that election of 1992 Kiptarus Kirior won. And was made the Assistant Minister in the Ministry of Culture in Moi's Govt of 1992 to 1997.

=== 1997–2002 ===
Remember this is the time Ainamoi was created out of the larger Belgut. Kirior now moved out to the newly created Ainamoi Constituency.

Contestants in that election of 1997 were:

1. Charles Kirui (was seeking for the second time)
2. Ayub Chepkwony (seeking re-election after losing to Kirior in 1992 election)
3. Wilson Soy (new entrant to Belgut Politics seeking for the first time)

In that election of 1997 Charles Kirui won. This election marked the end of Ayub's political career. He later fell sick and died.

=== 2002–2007 ===
Contestants in the election of 2002 were as follows:

1. Charles Keter (New entrant to new smaller Belgut politics after Ainamoi was split out of the Larger Belgut. A former employee of Kenya Telecom Corporation and a brother-in-law to Charles Kirui)
2. Charles Kirui (Was defending his seat)

Charles Keter won and trumped over his brother-in-law . This marked the end of Kirui's political career in Belgut Politics.

=== 2007–2013 ===
Contestants in the election of 2007 were as follows:

1. Charles Keter( was defending his seat on an ODM ticket)
2. Justice Kemei( a new entrant to Belgut Politics seeking the seat on a UDM ticket)
3. Eric Arap Keter - Mlimani ( a new entrant seeking the seat on a NARC ticket)
4. Esther Keino (Was seeking the seat on an (ODM -K ticket)

In that election of 2007 Charles Keter won. He was the first MP in Belgut's political history to be re-elected for a second term in a row.

=== 2013–2017 ===
In the general election of 2013 it saw the creation of a new constituency out of the Belgut. The new constituency was named Sigowet-Soin Constituency. Contestants in the election of 2013 were as follows:

1. Eric Arap Keter - Mlimani (emerged the winner on a KANU ticket)
2. Nelson Koech-Sonko ( URP ticket)
3. Nixon Sigei-Pakistan

=== 2017–2022 ===
The contestants in the general election of 2022 were as follows:

1. Eric Arap keter (defending his seat on an independent ticket)
2. Nelson Koech (second time aspirant running on a Jubilee ticket)
3. Dominic Mutai - magufuli (running on a CCM ticket)
4. Raymond Cheruiyot (running on a KANU ticket)

Nelson Koech won with 34293 votes. Eric Arap keter came in second with 18171 votes.

== See also ==
- Ainamoi Constituency
- Kipkelion East Constituency
- Kipkelion West Constituency
