= Bureti Constituency =

Kenyan electoral constituency

Bureti
- constituency for the Parliament of Kenya
- Bureti Constituency within Kericho County

- Kericho County within Kenya
- County: Kericho
- Population: 199,470
- Area: 321 km^{2} (123.9 sq mi)

Current constituency
- Number of members: 1
- Party: UDA
- Member of Parliament: Kibet Kirui Komingoi
- Wards: 7

Bureti Constituency is an electoral constituency in Kenya. It is one of six constituencies of Kericho County. It was one of two constituencies of the former Buret District. The constituency was established for the 1963 elections.

== Members of Parliament ==
Elections	MP	Party	Notes
1963	Taaitta Toweett	KADU	
1966	Alexander K. Arap Biy	KANU	One-party system
1969	Taaitta Toweett	KANU	One-party system
1974	Taaitta Toweett	KANU	One-party system
1979	Jonathan Kimetet arap Ng’eno	KANU	One-party system
1983	Jonathan Kimetet arap Ng’eno	KANU	One-party system.
1988	Timothy Mibei Kipkoech	KANU	One-party system.
1992	Jonathan Kimetet arap Ng’eno	KANU	
1997	Kipkorir Marisin Sang alias Chamanbuch	KANU	
2002	Kipkorir Marisin Sang alias Chamanbuch	KANU	
2007	Franklin Bett alias Chepkooit	ODM	
2013	Leonard Sang (Panadol)	URP	
2017	Japhet Kiptergech Mutai	Jubilee	
2022	Kibet Komingoi (Sebuleni)	United Democratic Alliance	

Wards
Ward	Registered Voters	Local Authority
Cheborge	4,619	Litein town
Cheplanget	7,549	Litein town
Kapkatet	4,806	Litein town
Kusumek	4,241	Litein town
Litein	7,914	Litein town
Chemosot	5,290	Bureti county
Kibugat	1,710	Bureti county
Kisiara	6,371	Bureti county
Tebesonik	4,439	Bureti county
Total	49,490	
*September 2005.
