= Koros =

Koros may refer to:

- Koros (mythology), a Greek mythological figure
- Kipsengeret Koros (born 1979), Kenyan politician
- Lily Koros Tare (born 1973), Kenyan medical administrator
- Körös (disambiguation)
- Kőrös (disambiguation)
- Kórós, a village in Hungary
- KOROS or Korea Rolling Stock Corporation, a South Korean machinery company

== See also ==
- Koro (disambiguation)
