= Kericho East =

Constituency in Kericho County

Kericho East Constituency - (1963-1988) the now defunct constituency was among the post colonial constituencies in the current Kericho County. It was later changed to Kipkelion Constituency in the General Election of 1988. Kipkelion Constituency was later split into Kipkelion West and Kipkelion East Constituencies for the General Election of 2013, in line with the New Constitution of Kenya (2010).

== Members of Parliament ==
Election	MP	Party	Notes
1963	Christopher Kiprotich Arap Murei	KANU	One party System
1966	Christopher Kiprotich Arap Murei	KANU	One party System
1969	Moses Kiprono arap Keino	KANU	One party System
1974	Moses Kiprono arap Keino	KANU	One party System
1979	Moses Kiprono arap Keino	KANU	One party System
1983	Kipsongol Arap Koske	KANU	One party System

== Related Links ==
- Kipkelion Constituency
- Kipkelion East Constituency
- Kipkelion West Constituency
