= Kipkelion Constituency =

Former Kenyan electoral constituency

Kipkelion Constituency was an electoral constituency in Kenya (1988-2012). It was a successor of the defunct Kericho East Constituency (1963-1988). It was one of the three constituencies of Kericho District. The constituency was established for the 1988 elections. It was later divided into Kipkelion East Constituency and Kipkelion West Constituency, both part of Kericho County.

== Members of Parliament ==
Elections	MP	Party	Notes
1988	Richard Kipnge’no Koech	KANU	One-party system.
1990	W. K. Kikwai	KANU	By-election, one party system
1992	Daniel K. arap Tanui	KANU	
1997	Samuel K. A. Rotich	KANU	
2002	Sammy Kipkemoi Rutto	KANU	
2007	Kiprono Langat	ODM	General Election

== Locations and wards ==
Locations
Location	Population*
Barsiele	5,020
Chepseon	12,895
Chilchila	10,312
Kamasian	12,700
Kapkoros	7,987
Kapseger	10,881
Kedowa	13,009
Kimugul	11,277
Kipchorian	8,242
Kipsegi	9,894
Kipsirichet	10,260
Kipteris	6,368
Kokwet	11,519
Kunyak	7,563
Lemotit	9,361
Lesirwa	5,413
Londiani	12,168
Masaita	10,237
Sogeet	8,755
Tendeno	6,526
Total	x
1999 census.

Wards
Ward	Registered Voters	Local Authority
Barsiele	4,097	Kipkelion town
Chesinende	4,645	Kipkelion town
Kimugul	3,717	Kipkelion town
Lesirwa	3,313	Kipkelion town
Kedowa	4,775	Londiani town
Kipsirichet	3,667	Londiani town
Londiani	4,825	Londiani town
Masaita / Tuiyobei	3,184	Londiani town
Cheboswa	5,751	Kipsigis county
Chilchila	3,349	Kipsigis county
Kamasian	6,281	Kipsigis county
Kapseger	3,284	Kipsigis county
Kipteres	2,231	Kipsigis county
Kokwet	3,500	Kipsigis county
Kunyak	4,487	Kipsigis county
Lemotit	2,580	Kipsigis county
Sorget	3,464	Kipsigis county
Tendeno	2,347	Kipsigis county
Total	69,497	
*September 2005.
