= Kipkalya Kones =

Kenyan politician (1952–2008)

Kipkalya Kiprono Kones

Minister of Roads
- In office 17 April 2008 – 10 June 2008
- President: Mwai Kibaki
- Preceded by: Simeon Nyachae
- Succeeded by: Franklin Bett

Minister of Public Works and Housing
- In office 1997–2002
- President: Daniel arap Moi

Member of Parliament for Bomet Constituency
- In office 1988–2002
- Preceded by: Isaac Kipkorir Salat
- Succeeded by: Nick Salat
- In office 2007 – 10 June 2008
- Preceded by: Nick Salat
- Succeeded by: Beatrice Kones

Personal details
- Born: February 22, 1952 Kenya
- Died: June 10, 2008 (aged 56) Narok District, Kenya
- Party: Orange Democratic Movement (ODM)
- Other political affiliations: Kenya African National Union (KANU) (until 2002); Ford-People (2002–2007)
- Spouse: Beatrice Kones
- Occupation: Politician

Kipkalya Kiprono Kones (22 February 1952 – 10 June 2008) was a Kenyan politician who served as a minister during the 1990s and briefly as Minister of Roads in 2008. He was a member of the National Assembly of Kenya from 1988 to 2008.

He first attempted to win a parliamentary seat at the 1983 elections, but lost to his opponent Isaac Kipkorir Salat. Following the death of Salat in 1988, Kones won the seat from Bomet Constituency at a by-election as part of the Kenya African National Union (KANU) in 1988. He was appointed an Assistant Minister of Agriculture by President Daniel arap Moi. He was re-elected in the 1992 election and was appointed by Moi as a Minister of State in the Office of the President. In the 1997 election, he was again re-elected, and Moi appointed him as Minister for Public Works and Housing; he was subsequently moved to the posts of Minister for Research, Science and Technology and Minister for Vocational Training.

Before the 2002 election, he fell out with President Moi and joined the Muungano wa Mageuzi movement led by James Orengo. For the 2002 elections, Kones switched his affiliation to Ford-People, where he was the running mate of 2002 presidential candidate Simon Nyachae, but lost the seat to Nick Salat, son of former MP Isaac Kipkorir Salat who represented KANU, the party Kones had recently left. However, he was appointed by Forum for the Restoration of Democracy for a nominated seat and thus remained a member of parliament. He was also appointed assistant minister for public works.

He opposed family planning among smaller tribes stating those tribes should grow in numbers to equal bigger tribes.

As a member of the Orange Democratic Movement (ODM), he again won the seat from Bomet in the December 2007 parliamentary election. Kones was appointed as Minister of Roads in the grand coalition Cabinet, which was named on 13 April 2008 and included both the ODM and the Party of National Unity (PNU); the Cabinet was sworn in on 17 April.

He was killed along with Assistant Minister of Home Affairs Lorna Laboso in a plane crash on 10 June 2008. The plane crashed into a building in Kajong'a market near Nairagie Enkare in Enoosupukia, Narok District, near Narok and the Masai Mara game reserve. The plane carrying Kones and Laboso, a Cessna light aircraft, had taken off from Wilson Airport in Nairobi; flying to Kericho in the Rift Valley to help with the organisation of logistics for ODM candidate Benjamin Langat in the by-election that was scheduled to be held in Ainamoi Constituency on 11 June. In addition to Kones and Laboso, the pilot and a security guard were killed.

President Mwai Kibaki sent his condolences and ordered flags to fly at half mast, saying that Kenya had "lost leaders of immense potential at their prime age and with a promising future." Prime Minister Raila Odinga, the ODM leader, said that it was a "sad moment"; believing that it was too late to delay the planned by-elections, he urged ODM supporters to use the by-elections as a tribute to Kones and Laboso by turning out to vote for the ODM's candidates.

The "List of alleged perpetrators" of the 2007/2008 post-electoral violence of the Kenya National Human Rights Commission however lists him among the suspects on place 4 and charges him with "planning, incitement, and financing the violence".

Following the death of Kones, by-elections at Bomet Constituency were held on 25 September 2008. The seat was won by Beatrice Cherono Kones of ODM, the widow of Kipkalya Kones. Beatrice Kones was re-elected as the Member of Parliament, Bomet East Constituency, in the year 2017 under the Jubilee political party.

Political offices
| Preceded by ? | Minister of Roads; 2008–present | Incumbent |
| Preceded by ? | Member of the National Assembly of Kenya for Bomet; 1988–2008 | Succeeded by Beatrice Kones |
