= Lorna Laboso =

Kenyan politician

Lorna Chepkemoi Laboso (8 November 1961 – 10 June 2008) was a Kenyan Politician born in Kericho District. She was briefly a Member of Parliament and an Assistant Minister in the Ministry of Home Affairs in the Vice President's Office in 2008.

Laboso received an Undergraduate Bachelor of Arts Degree In Mass Communication from Daystar University in 2007. She was elected to the National Assembly of Kenya for the first time in the December 2007 parliamentary election as the MP of Sotik Constituency. In the grand coalition Cabinet formed in April 2008, she was appointed as Assistant Minister in the Office of the Vice President.

She was killed along with Minister of Roads Kipkalya Kones in a plane crash on June 10, 2008. The plane crashed into a building in Kajong'a market near Nairagie Enkare in Enoosupukia, Narok District, near Narok and the Masai Mara game reserve. The plane carrying Laboso and Kones, a Cessna light aircraft, had taken off from Wilson Airport in Nairobi; they had been flying to Kericho in the Rift Valley to help with the organization of logistics for ODM candidate Benjamin Langat in the by-election that was scheduled to be held in Ainamoi Constituency on June 11. In addition to Kones and Laboso, the pilot and a security guard were killed.

President Mwai Kibaki sent his condolences and ordered flags to fly at half mast, saying that Kenya had "lost leaders of immense potential at their prime age and with a promising future." Prime Minister Raila Odinga, the ODM leader, said that it was a "sad moment"; believing that it was too late to delay the planned by-elections, he urged ODM supporters to use the by-elections as a tribute to Laboso and Kones by turning out to vote for the ODM's candidates.

The "List of alleged perpetrators" of the 2007/2008 post-electoral violence of the Kenya National Human Rights Commission however lists her among the suspects on place 1 (page 177) and charges her with "planning and incitement to violence".

Following the death of Laboso, a by-election was held in the Sotik Constituency on 25 September 2008. The seat was won by Laboso's sister, Joyce Cherono for the ODM.
