= Taaitta Toweett =

Kenyan writer, linguist and politician

The Honourable Dr Taaitta Arap Toweett EBS

7th Minister for Education
- In office 1976–1979
- President: Jomo Kenyatta

3rd Minister for Housing and Social Services
- In office 1974–1976
- President: Jomo Kenyatta

5th Minister for Education
- In office 1969–1974
- President: Jomo Kenyatta

Minister for Labour and Housing
- In office 1961–1962
- Governor General: Malcolm MacDonald

Minister for Lands, Surveys and Town Planning
- In office 1962–1963
- Governor General: Malcolm MacDonald

Assistant Minister for Agriculture
- In office 1960–1961
- Governor General: Malcolm MacDonald

Nominated Member of Parliament
- In office 1992–1997
- President: Daniel Arap Moi

Nominated Member of Parliament
- In office 1983–1988
- President: Daniel Arap Moi

Member of Parliament for Bureti Constituency
- In office 1969–1979
- President: Jomo Kenyatta
- Preceded by: Alexander K. Arap Biy
- Succeeded by: Jonathan Kimetet arap Ng'eno

1st Member of Parliament for Bureti Constituency
- In office 1963–1966
- President: Jomo Kenyatta
- Preceded by: Constituency established
- Succeeded by: Alexander K. Arap Biy

1st Member of the Legislative Council for Southern Area (Comprising Kericho District and Maasai District)
- In office 1958–1963
- Preceded by: Constituency established
- Succeeded by: Constituency abolished

Personal details
- Born: Elisha Kipyegon Arap Toweett c. May 1925 Tebesonik, Litein, Kenya Colony
- Died: 8 October 2007 Nakuru, Kenya
- Cause of death: Automobile accident
- Citizenship: Kenya
- Party: KANU
- Spouse(s): Rachel Chemibei (m. 1952) (Rachael Taplule Chebet, Elizabeth Cherotich and Anna Kamaya)
- Children: 32
- Parent: Mzee Cheelogoi Arap Maero (father)
- Education: Alliance High School, Kikuyu; Cambridge School Certificate 1944–47; Jeans School (Kenya School of Government, Kikuyu) (Certificate in Social Work) 1949; Makerere University (Diploma in Sociology, English Literature and History) 1950; South Devon Technical College, Torquay (Diploma in Public and Social Administration) 1955; University of South Africa; BA 1956; BA (Hon) 1959; University of Nairobi; MA in Linguistics1973; University of Nairobi; PhD in Linguistics and Languages, Thesis "A Study of Kalenjin Linguistics" 1977
- Occupation: Politician, writer, poet, linguist
- Website: www.qwetunews.com/taita-arap-towett

Military service
- Years of service: 1953–2007

Dr. Elisha Kipyegon Taaitta Arap Toweett, also known as Taaitta Arap Toweett (c. May 1925 – 8 October 2007), was a scholar, writer, linguist and a Kenyan politician.

== Biography ==
Toweett was born in May 1925 at Tebesonik, near Litein, in Kisiara Location, Kericho District, Now Tebosonik ward, Kericho county, Kenya. His father Cheelogoi Araap Maeero (who died in 1976, aged 110) was originally from Mokomoni, North Mugirango, and his mother was Tapaase Temugo (who died in 1934). He had a younger sister, Christina Turgut, and a younger brother, John Toweett. Toweett was educated at Chebwagan Primary School, African Government School in Kabianga (1939–43), Alliance High School in Kikuyu (1944–47), and at Makerere University College, where he studied Sociology, English Literature and History.

He decided to become a social worker and joined Jeans School, now Kenya Institute of Administration, Kabete, where he trained for social welfare work. He was appointed Welfare Officer in Kericho in 1950. In 1953 he worked briefly as a broadcaster with Voice of Kenya (VOK), African Service, Kisumu. He was awarded a scholarship by the Kipsigis County Council in 1955 to the South Devon Technical College, Torquay, to study for a diploma in public and social administration. He obtained a B.A. (1956) and B.A. (Hons) 1959 from the University of South Africa. On his return from Britain in 1957, he was appointed Community Development Officer for Nandi District, the first African CDO to be recruited locally in Kenya. During this period was the editor of the Kipsigis vernacular magazine Ngalek Ap Kipsigisiek, published quarterly.

He was one of the eight original Africans elected to the Legislative Council in 1958 as Member for the Southern Area, a constituency comprising mainly Kipsigis and Maasai Districts. He formed Kalenjin Political Alliance Party that later on got into an alliance with KADU. He served on the Dairy Board and played a crucial role in the foundation of the co-operative movement nationally. In 1960, 1962, 1963 he attended the Lancaster House Conferences held in London to draft Kenya's Constitution, paving the way for complete self-rule.

While serving in the Legislative Council, he was appointed as Minister for Lands and Physical Planning in 1958 and he once told a mammoth crowd of Kipsigis who had besieged him at a public rally at Sosiot in Belgut, he made the famous remarks saying that ‘'Those who want free land should go to and settles in Sahara Desert, because there was plenty of disused land in the desert.

He told them to form small land buying companies and buy big farms in the then White highlands, this at the same time happened while his neighbour and friend Jaramogi Oginga Odinga was telling his Luo followers that when Kenya becomes an independent country the land will be plenty and free for every landless Kenyan. Jaramogi told his people that the White settlers had stolen the fertile land from Africans and occupied it and that they would be chased away by an African post-independence government. This was an eye-opener to the Kipsisgis people. Most of them bought farms in the White highlands, and settled many families in areas like Londiani, Sotik, Kitale, Eldoret, Molo, Kedowa and Lembwa.

He was appointed Assistant Minister for Agriculture (1960); re-elected to the Legislative Council in 1961; appointed Minister of Labour and Housing in 1961 AND Minister of Lands, Surveys and Town Planning in 1962. He was elected Kadu Member for Bureti Constituency in 1963. He joined KANU and resigned from Parliament. In 1969, he returned to Parliament as the MP for Buret and was appointed Minister for Education. He was re-elected to Parliament in the 1974 General Election and was appointed Minister for Housing and Social Services. He obtained his M.A. in Linguistics from the University of Nairobi, for which he had registered in 1973.

He became Minister for Education in 1976, and was elected President of the 19th General Assembly of UNESCO (1976–78). In 1977, he finished his PhD thesis on "A Study of Kalenjin Linguistics".

He lost the general election in 1979, but was appointed Chairman of Kenya Literature Bureau (KLB). He did not contest the 1983 General Election but returned to parliament as a nominated MP. From 1983 to mid-1985 he served as Chairman of Kenya Airways, from there he was appointed Chairman of Kenya Seed Company where he served until 1998. From 1992 to 1997 he was back in parliament as a nominated MP. He also served as a Director of the Kenya Times newspaper, and published and edited his own newspaper, Voice of Rift Valley, from 1997 to 2000. From 2002 he wrote a weekly column in the Kenya Times called "Face To Face With Guru". He was actively involved in the Constitution Review Process at Bomas of Kenya, 2003–04.

Dr. Toweett had a large diverse family with four wives; the late Rachel Chemibei, the late Rachel Chebet Taplule and Elizabeth Cherotich, Anna Kamaya. He has 32 children including and over 40 grandchildren including Patricia Chepkemoi Byegon and great-grandchildren.

Weeks before he died he was dictating, from memory, his unique life story to one of his sons Xhuuma Maseeti, who was compiling his autobiography. In his 1963 poem "Polygamy," Dr. Toweett wrote: "my ambition is nil except for writing."

He died on 8 October 2007 after an automobile accident. The car he was traveling in collided head on with a canter truck a few kilometers from his Shimoni residence.

== Bibliography ==
- Epitaph on Colonialism and Shorter Poems
- An Africans Year in England
- A Study of Kalenjin Linguistics (1979)
- English-Kiswahili-Kalenjin Dictionary (1979)
- English-Swahili-Kalenjin Nouns Dictionary
- Oral Traditional History of The Kipsigis (1980)
- Tears Over A Dead Cow and Other Stories
- 100 Daily Essays
- Unsung Heroes of Lancaster: Call a Spade a Spade Historical Memoirs (2011)
