= Joseph Cherorot =

Kenyan politician

Joseph Cherorot MP

Member of Parliament for Kipkelion East
- Incumbent
- Assumed office 9 August 2022
- Preceded by: Joseph Limo

Personal details
- Party: United Democratic Alliance
- Website: Parliamentary website

Joseph Kimutai Cherorot is a Kenyan politician who is currently a member of the National Assembly for the Kipkelion East constituency, representing the Peoples Democratic Party.

== Biography ==
Cherorot graduated from Kamungili Primary School in 1980 and Londiani Secondary School in 1984. He earned a Bachelor of Arts in Political Science and Public Administration from Maasai Mara University in 2016, and a doctorate degree from United States International University Africa. He served as senior advisor to Puntland president Abdiweli Gaas from 2014 to 2018.

== National Assembly ==
Cherorot has advocated for education funding and resources to be allocated to his constituency. He has also called for hiring practices to not consider work experience when applying for jobs, noting that discriminatory practices may occur to new graduates.
