= Ainamoi =

- Ainamoi valley

- Location within Kenya
- Coordinates: 0.3°S 35.28°E
- Country: Kenya
- Province: Rift Valley Province

Population (2019)
  - Density: 633/km^{2} (1,640/sq mi)
  - Urban: 12,250
  - Metro: 20,211
- Time zone: UTC+3 (EAT)

Ainamoi is a settlement in Kenya's Kericho County formerly part of the Rift Valley Province.

The settlement is part of the Ainamoi Constituency.

== Notable people ==
- Emily Chebet, professional long-distance runner
- Paul Chepkwony, politician and professor
- Ernest Ng'eno, Anglican bishop

== See also ==
- Kerio River
