= Laboso =

Laboso is a surname. Notable people with the surname include:

- Joyce Laboso (1960–2019), Kenyan politician
- Lorna Laboso (1961–2008), Kenyan politician, sister of Joyce
