= Kerch (disambiguation) =

Kerch is a city in Crimea in Eastern Europe.

Kerch, Kerech, Kerich or Korch (Persian: كرچ) may refer to:

== Places ==
- Kerch Strait, a strait between Black Sea and Azov Sea
- Kerch Peninsula, a peninsula on Crimean side of the Kerch Strait
- Kerch, Isfahan, a village in Isfahan Province, Iran
- Kerch, South Khorasan, a village in South Khorasan Province, Iran

=== Fictional places ===
- Kerch, a fictional nation in Leigh Bardugo's Grishaverse

== People with the surname ==
- Alfred Kiprato Kerich, Kenyan politician
- Morten Korch (1876–1954), Danish writer

== Other uses ==
- Russian destroyer Kerch, Fidonisy-class destroyer of the Imperial Russian Navy
- Soviet cruiser Kerch, the former Italian cruiser Emanuele Filiberto Duca d'Aosta in Soviet Navy service
- Russian cruiser Kerch, a Project 1134B Berkut B (Kara-class) missile cruiser of the Soviet and later Russian Navy.
