= David Kimutai Too =

Kenyan politician

David Kimutai Too (August 23, 1968 – January 31, 2008) was a Kenyan politician affiliated to the Orange Democratic Movement (ODM). He was a high school teacher and then a principal from Kericho in Rift Valley, Kenya before being elected to the National Assembly from Ainamoi Constituency from a field of 13 candidates in the December 2007 parliamentary election. Charles Keter, a fellow Member of Parliament, described Too as "a very humble, quiet man." The "List of alleged perpetrators" of the 2007/2008 post-electoral violence of the Kenya National Human Rights Commission however lists him among the suspects on place 3 (page 180) and charges him with "planning, incitement, and financing the violence".

== Death ==
Hon Too was shot dead by Andrew Moache, a policeman, on January 31, 2008. The shooting occurred during the same period as the rioting that swept Kenya following the disputed Kenyan 2007 presidential election.

He was killed along with his girlfriend, policewoman Eunice Chepkwony, who was also dating the police officer who shot them, Andrew Moache, according to the official account of the incident. It was found by account of witnesses during the court cases that Eunice and Too were parked in West Indies Estate in Eldoret Town. Andrew while trailing them on his government issued motorbike, got into a confrontation with Eunice outside the vehicle and shot her in self-defence. He then shot Too who emerged from the car with a gun. Eunice was shot on the thigh and chest while Too was shot on the shoulders, chest and received a fatal shot to the head. David Too died right away, and Eunice died while undergoing treatment at Moi Teaching and Referral Hospital, Eldoret.

== Aftermath ==
Too's death sparked more riots, as public opinion- in part shaped by the utterances of ODM bigwigs- was that it was politically motivated since he was a member of the Kalenjin tribe which heavily supported Raila Odinga in the elections and was the second member of parliament of the ODM party killed that week (the first was Melitus Mugabe Were). Kenyan government officials rushed to deny any claims that it was politically motivated, claiming that it was a "crime of passion". However, rioters and the opposition movement denied this explanation, the ODM calling it an assassination, accusing the government of seeking to reduce the number of ODM Members of Parliament. Mediation talks with Kofi Annan were temporarily halted and UN Secretary-General Ban Ki-moon announced that he would come to Kenya to assist in the mediation process.

Too's funeral, widely attended by opposition leaders, was held on February 9 in Chepkoiyo Village Poiywek in Ainamoi, Kericho. ODM Secretary-General Anyang Nyongo said at the funeral that "the blood of David Too must run to the door of those who stole the election". The subsequent Ainamoi constituency by-election was won by his brother Hon. Benjamin Langat.
