= Sylvanus Maritim =

Kenyan politician

Sylvanus Maritim is a Kenyan politician who was a member of the National Assembly from Ainamoi Constituency. He was a member of the ruling JP prior to the 2022, and now he belongs to the UDA.

== Election results ==
General election 2017: Ainamoi
| Party | Candidate | Votes | % |
|---|---|---|---|
| Jubilee | Sylvanus Maritim | 32,987 | 56.7 |
| Independent | Benjamim Kipkurui Langat | 20,396 | 35.1 |
| ODM | Stellah Chepkurui | 4,224 | 7.3 |
| KANU | John Kibet Keino | 260 | 0.4 |
| Independent | Joseph Kibore Rotich | 260 | 0.4 |
| Majority | | 12,591 | 21.7 |
