= Jonathan Kimetet arap Ng'eno =

4th Speaker of the National Assembly of Kenya

4th Speaker of the National Assembly of Kenya
- In office 1991–1993
- President: Daniel arap Moi
- Preceded by: Moses Kiprono arap Keino
- Succeeded by: Francis Ole Kaparo

4th and 6th Member of Parliament for Bureti Constituency
- In office 1979–1988
- President: Daniel Arap Moi
- Preceded by: Taaitta Toweett
- Succeeded by: Timothy Mibei Kipkoech

Member of Parliament for Bureti Constituency
- In office 1992–1997
- President: Daniel Arap Moi
- Preceded by: Timothy Mibei Kipkoech
- Succeeded by: Kipkorir Marisin Sang alias Chamanbuch

Personal details
- Born: Jonathan Kimetet arap Ng'eno; 1 January 1937 Bureti, Kericho County, Kenya
- Died: 12 June 1998 (aged 61) Nairobi Hospital, Nairobi, Kenya
- Resting place: Bureti, Kericho County
- Party: KANU

Jonathan Kimetet arap Ng'eno (c.1937 - 12 June 1998) was a Kenyan politician and a member of parliament for Bureti Constituency in Kericho County. He served in different parliament sittings for three terms; two consecutive and one different term.

== Political career ==
Ng'eno was first elected into parliament in 1979 election on a KANU ticket. He was re-elected in 1983 snap election on a KANU ticket. In 1988 General Election he lost to Timothy Kipkoech Arap Mibey a lawyer from Bureti. He bounced back to parliament in the general election of 1992 through a KANU ticket again.

== Speaker ==
He served as Speaker of the National Assembly of Kenya from 1991 when Moses Keino resigned and when Ng'eno was re-elected to parliament he then again was elected to serve as a speaker from 1992 to 1993.

== Ministerial Position ==
He served as the Minister for Public Works and Housing from 1992 to 1997.He had earlier served as a Minister for Education taking over from Dr. Taaitta Toweett who is perceived to have been the best Education Minister that Kenya has ever had. Bureti Constituency held the Ministry of Education leadership for a record of 16 years.

== Board Position ==
He was appointed to the position of board chairperson of National Water Conservation and Pipeline Corporation in 1989.

== Death ==
Ng'eno died at Nairobi Hospital, ICU on 12 June 1998.
