= Hilary Kosgei =

Kenyan Politician

Hilary Kiplang'at Kosgei is a Kenya Legislator serving as the Member of the National Assembly for Kipkelion West Constituency in Kericho County since 2017. He is an affiliate of the United Democratic Alliance (UDA) party and was formerly with the Jubilee Party.

== Education ==
Hilary Kosgei started his formal education at Koru Farm Primary School, earning his Kenya Certificate of Primary Education (KCPE) between 1981 and 1988. He then attended Kericho High School from 1989 to 1992 to complete his Kenya Certificate of Secondary Education (KCSE). He proceeded to Kenyatta University, and graduated with a Bachelor of Arts degree in Economics between 1994 and 1998.

== Career ==
From 2002 to 2012, he served as the Sole Practitioner at Munene Wambugu & Co. Advocates, subsequently advancing to Managing Partner from 2012 to 2017. Also, in April 2017, he was appointed at the Kenya Bureau of Standards (KEBS) as a board member.

=== Political career ===
Hilary won the Kipkelion West Constituency parliamentary seat on a Jubilee Party ticket in August, 2017. He was later elected as a member of the 13th Parliament from September 8, 2022, till present under the United Democratic Alliance (UDA) banner.

During the 12th Parliament, he was a member of the Departmental Committee on Environment and Natural Resources (2017–2020) and the Regional Integration Committee (2020–2022). Currently, he serves as a member of the Committee on Implementation and holds the position of Vice Chairman for the Social Protection Committee.
