= Wesley K. Rono =

Kenyan politician

Wesley Kimngeno arap Rono was the Second Member of Parliament for Belgut Constituency in Kericho County in 1969. Before he joined politics he served as the Principal for Cheptenye Boys in Kericho County. He held a BSc from the University of Nairobi.

Wesley Rono served as Belgut MP from 1969 to 1974.

"Wesley arap Rono has gone to be with the Lord aged 95. We are grateful for the services he rendered our great constituency during his time," Belgut MP Nelson Koech.
