= Kipngetich =

Kipngetich (also Kipng'etich) is a surname of Kenyan origin that stems from the surname Ngetich with the prefix Kip- (meaning "son of"). It may refer to:

- Daniel Kipngetich Komen (born 1976), Kenyan long-distance track runner and former 5000 metres world champion
- Franklin Kipngetich Bett (born 1953), Kenyan politician for the Orange Democratic Movement and Minister of Roads
- Paul Kipngetich Tanui (born 1990), Kenyan long-distance runner and 2011 World Championships medallist
- Robert Kipngetich (born 1982), Kenyan long-distance track runner
- Silas Kipngetich Sang (born 1978), Kenyan half marathon runner

== See also ==
- Ngetich
