= Ronald Ngala =

Kenyan politician

Ronald Gideon Ngala

President, Kenya African Democratic Union (KADU)
- In office 25 June 1960 – 12 November 1964

Personal details
- Born: 1923 Gotani, Kenya
- Died: 25 December 1972 (aged 48–49)
- Citizenship: Kenya
- Party: KADU and KANU
- Spouse: Esther Mwenda Ngala
- Children: 13
- Education: Makerere University
- Occupation: Politician
- Profession: Teacher
- Cabinet: Cooperative and social Services

Ronald Gideon Ngala (1923–1972) was a Kenyan politician who was the leader of the Kenya African Democratic Union political party from its creation in 1960 until its dissolution in 1964.

== Early career ==
Ngala was born in 1922 at Gotani in Giriama country. In 1929 the family moved to Vishakani near Kaloleni, which was to be Ngala's home for the rest of his life. Ngala attended The Alliance High School and Makerere University College where he gained a teaching diploma. He worked as a teacher in Kenya's coastal region and later became headmaster of Mbale Secondary School in Taita-Taveta District. In 1952 he was transferred to Buxton School in Mombasa where he served as the principal.

== Political career ==
=== Legislative Council ===
Ngala began his national career by being elected to the Legislative Council in 1957. In the 1957 elections to the legislative council, Ngala was elected to represent the Coast Rural constituency. Following these elections, Ngala, along with Tom Mboya, Oginga Odinga, Lawrence Oguda, Masinde Muliro, Daniel Arap Moi, Benard Mate and James Miumi formed the African Elected Members Organisation (AEMO) and signed a controversial press statement declaring Kenya's Lyttelton constitution on which they had been elected, void. One of the declarations of AEMO was that none of the African elected members of the legislative council would take any ministerial office. This constitutional crisis led to the first Lancaster House conference in 1960 at which the African delegation sought a new constitution for Kenya At the Lancaster House conference, the ban on nationwide African political parties was lifted and the African delegation agreed to form the Kenya African National Union (KANU). Ngala was appointed to the committee which drafted KANU's constitution and at a meeting held on 14 May 1960, in Kiambu, he was elected as the party's treasurer in absentia which he declined having expected to be appointed the chairman. Daniel Moi also declined the assistant chairman slot. They later formed KADU.

=== Kenya African Democratic Union (KADU) ===
After the formation of KANU, a number of smaller parties formed which represented the interests of minority tribes. At a meeting of the leaders of these parties held in Ngong on 25 June 1960, the Kenya African Democratic Union (KADU) was formed with Ngala as its leader, in opposition to KANU. At the 1961 legislative council elections KADU led by Ngala won 11 seats to KANU's 19, however, the leaders of KANU refused to form any government until Jomo Kenyatta was released from house arrest. KADU under Ngala agreed to form a government and Ngala became Leader of Government Business and later Chief Minister. Jomo Kenyatta was released from house arrest later in 1961 and became president of KANU. Under Kenyatta's leadership KANU won 83 of the 129 seats in the national assembly at the 1963 elections. On 12 November 1964 six key members of KADU crossed the floor to KANU. The leaders of KADU, including Ronald Ngala, Masinde Muliro and Daniel Arap Moi decided to dissolve KADU and join KANU.

=== Post-Independence ===
Ronald Ngala was made Minister of Cooperatives and Social Services in the Kenyatta government. He went on to become one of KANU’s vice-presidents at the 1966 Limuru Conference in which Oginga Odinga was ejected from KANU. Ngala remained active in the government until he died in a road accident in 1972. The circumstances of Ngala's death in 1972 were suspicious, but nobody was arrested or charged, and there was no inquiry.

== Personal life ==
He was married to Esther Mwenda Ngala, with whom they had 12 children, among them his son Noah Katana Ngala, a former cabinet minister.

== Sources ==
- Aseka, Eric Masinde (1993). Ronald Ngala. East African Publishers. ISBN 9966-46-796-3.
- Cooper, Carole; Bailey, J. R. A.; Bundeh, Garth (1993). Kenya: The National Epic. East African Publishers.
- "KANU Formation and the 1960s". State House of Kenya. Archived from the original on 27 September 2011.
- Kariuki, G. G. (2001). The illusion of power: reflections on fifty years in Kenya politics. East African Publishers. ISBN 9966-25-109-X.
- "Kenya: 1963 House of Representatives election results". Electoral Institute for the Sustainability of Democracy in Africa.
- Kenya National Assembly Official Record (Hansard). Vol. 3. 1 December 1993.
- "Life and Times Of Ronald Ngala". Africa 24 Media. Archived from the original on 24 August 2011.
- Njogu, Kimani; Oluoch-Olunya, Garnette (2007). Cultural production and social change in Kenya: building bridges. African Books Collective. ISBN 978-9966-9743-7-2.
- Okoth, Assa (2006). A History of Africa: African nationalism and the de-colonisation process. East African Publishers. ISBN 9966-25-358-0.
