= Moses Kiprono arap Keino =

3rd Speaker of the National Assembly

3rd Speaker of the National Assembly of Kenya
- In office April 12, 1988 – June 11, 1991
- Preceded by: Frederick Mbiti Gideon Mati
- Succeeded by: Prof. Jonathan Kimetet arap Ng'eno

Personal details
- Born: 1937

Moses Kiprono arap Keino (September, 1937 – November 4, 1998) was Speaker of the Parliament of Kenya from 1988 until 1991.

== Education and early life ==
Between 1962 and 1967, Keino attended Hochschule fur Ökonomie (University of Economics), Karlhorst, East Berlin, Germany and graduated with a master's in economics.

== Political career ==
Moses Kiprono arap Keino served as a Member of Parliament representing Kericho East Constituency for 15 years on a KANU ticket [1969 – 1983]. On the hindsight of a long parliamentary service stretching to the Second Parliament, he had served on several Standing and ad hoc Select Committees; and both as Deputy Chief Whip and Deputy Speaker. As the Deputy Speaker of the Fourth Parliament his tenure was cut short by his resignation on June 20, 1983 .

On 12 April 1988 Moses Kiprono arap Keino was elected unopposed as the Speaker of the Parliament of Kenya KANU and served till June 11, 1991 .

Moses Kiprono arap Keino later crossed over to the Opposition [FORD] and fought for Multi-Party Politics in Kenya until the then President Daniel arap Moi allowed it in the 1992 elections.

FORD was split into two factions namely; Ford-Asili under Kenneth Matiba and Forum for the Restoration of Democracy–Kenya under the late Jaramogi Oginga Odinga father of the former Prime Minister of Kenya Hon. Raila Odinga. In 1992, he contested the Kipkelion Constituency parliamentary seat which was considered a KANU zone under FORD-KENYA.

== Death ==
Moses Kiprono arap Keino died November 4, 1998, and was buried at his Sorget farm in Londiani, Kericho.

== See also ==
- Speaker of the National Assembly of Kenya
