= Litein =

Town in Western Kenya

Coordinates: 0°35′S 35°11′E

Litein is a town located in the Kericho County, Kenya. It was previously the capital of the former Buret District. Litein has an urban population of 4,000. The town is along the Kericho-Sotik road. It also has a road link to Bomet.

Litein's name originated from the word "liteito" - a stone used for sharpening iron objects during the pre-colonial period.

It is one of the busiest town in South Rift region and is surrounded by other towns like Kapkatet (which is known as the Kipsigis headquarters) Koiwa, Boito, Mogogosiek, Kusumek, Chemosot and Cheborge shopping centres. It is situated about 32 km from Kericho town, along Kericho-Sotik-Kisii highway.

The inhabitants are the Kipsigis - sub ethnic group of the larger Kalenjin community.

== Economy ==
The main economic activity in the area is farming of Tea and Maize together with livestock.

KCB, Equity, Family, co-orperative and Bureti tea sacco are the major financial institutions found here. Litein Tea Factory is 300m from Litein town. Litein's weather is good to farmers thus encouraging farming. .

== Services ==
AIC Litein Mission Hospital is also located here - Litein town - a five-minute walk from the town center

Churches around Litein are the Catholic church, Liberty Gospel Church, and the Africa Inland church, among others. It also has a small Mosque situated in its town center. Litein town has a serene environment suitable for learning. This is evidenced by various schools and colleges in the town. Primary schools in Litein town include Litein Primary (which is a public school), Chemitan, St. Mark, and Sally Ann, Chemitan academy among other private schools. High schools in Litein town include Litein Boys, Litein AIC Girls Litein East and a new Brilliance Mixed Day secondary school. Litein town also has numerous colleges which include Valley and KSPS, among others.

Hotels in Litein include Evening Star Litein, Sebuleni, Patnas, Classic offering accommodation and food services.
