= Nyanza Province African Union =

Defunct Kenyan political party

The Nyanza Province African Union (NPUA) was a political party in Kenya.

== History ==
The party contested one seat in the Senate in the 1963 general elections, in which it was elected unopposed.
