= Kipng'eno Arap Ng'eny =

Kenyan politician and telecommunications executive

Kipng'eno Arap Ng'eny (1937 – July 1, 2014) was a Kenyan politician and telecommunications executive. He served as the Managing Director of the now-defunct Kenya Posts and Telecommunications Corporation from 1979 until 1993. Ng'eny also served as a member of the Parliament of Kenya for Ainamoi Constituency from 1997 to 2002 and the country's Minister of Water Development within the administration of former President Daniel arap Moi.

Ng'eny died, following a long illness, at Aga Khan University Hospital in Nairobi on July 1, 2014, at the age of 77. His funeral was held at Consolata Shrine in the Westlands neighborhood on July 5, 2014. He chose cremation, rather than burial at his ancestral home, which is the norm for Kalenjin funeral rites. Other high-profile Kenyans who elected cremation include the late Wangari Maathai.
