= Joseph Limo =

Kenyan politician

Joseph Kirui Limo is a Kenyan politician who served as the Member of parliament for the Kipkelion East Constituency in 2013–2017 and 2017–2022. He currently serves as the Non-Executive chairperson of the Gambling Regulatory Authority of Kenya.

== Education ==
He holds a Bachelor of Commerce (Accounting) from Kenyatta University.
