= Masaita =

- Location within Kenya
- Coordinates: 0.13°S 35.58°E
- Country: Kenya
- County: Kericho County
- Time zone: UTC+3 (EAT)

Masaita is a settlement in Kenya's Kericho County.
