= African People's Party =

Political party in Kenya

The African People's Party (APP) was a political party in Kenya.

== History ==
The APP was established in September 1962 by Paul Ngei after he had left the Kenya African National Union (KANU) following a disagreement with Jomo Kenyatta and Tom Mboya. With much of its support from the Kamba, the party formed an electoral pact with the Kenya African Democratic Union (KADU) for the May 1963 general elections.

The elections saw the APP win eight seats in the House of Representatives and two in the Senate, all won in Kitui and Machakos. The party later abandoned its pact with KADU due to its support for a federal constitution, and was disbanded in September 1963 when its MPs joined KANU.
