= Baluhya Political Union =

Political party in Kenya

The Baluhya Political Union was a political party in Kenya.

== History ==
The party was established in July 1960. It nominated a single candidate, Musa Amalemba in North Nyanza, for the 1961 general elections. The party received 3.3% of the national vote and Amalemba was elected. In the 1963 elections its vote share was reduced to 0.8%, resulting in it losing its seat.

As the process of Kenya becoming a one-party state began, the party was deregistered in March 1965.
