= Kipsengeret Koros =

Hon. Kipsengeret Koros (born 1979) is a Kenyan Politician and a Member of Parliament for Sigowet-Soin Constituency in Kericho County, Kenya. He was elected in 2017 on an Independent ticket where he garnered 20,284 votes against the outgoing's 13,068 votes. Koros is the second Member of Parliament since the inception of Sigowet-Soin Constituency in the year 2013. He won the seat after defeating Justice Kemei.

== Early life and education ==
Kipsengeret was born 1979 in Motero village, Soin Division, Kericho to the Late Paul Kipkoros Kipsengeret Koech and Margaret Koech. He attended Motero Primary School for his primary school education then joined Nakuru High School for high school studies. He then went on to receive his Msc in Pharmacology & Toxicology from the University of Nairobi, graduating in 2009. He is currently awaiting to graduate for his PhD studies in toxicology (thesis completed) from the same university. He has had papers published in local and international journals.

== Political career ==
Kipsengeret joined politics in the year 2012 being URP youth leader in Kericho. In 2017 Koros was elected as a Member of Parliament for Sigowet-Soin Constituency.
