= Kiptere =

- Kenya: Belgut Constituency
- Time zone: UTC+3 (EAT)

Kiptere is a village located approximately 25 kilometres from Kericho town in the Rift Valley Province of Kenya.

It is a village inhabited by the Kipsigis-speaking people of the Kalenjin people. Kiptere comes from the word teret, a Kipsigis word for "clay pots". The Kipsigis people name places after dominant geographical features, abundant flora or fauna, or prominent inhabitants. It appears Kiptere's name came about because the area was well known for pottery.
