= Lily Koros Tare =

Kenyan medical administrator (born 1973)

- Born: 1 January 1973 (age 53); Sigowet, Kericho County, Kenya
- Citizenship: Kenya
- Known for: Business Administration
- Title: Chief executive officer Kenyatta National Hospital

Lily Chepkorir Koros Tare is a Kenyan medical administrator, who serves as Administration Secretary in the Kenya Ministry of Health, effective December 2018.

== Early life ==
Lily Koros Tare was born in the Sigowet Division of Kericho County, circa 1973.

== Education ==
Ms. Koros went to Kipsigis Girls High School in Kericho County for her secondary education and later proceeded to pursuing a bachelor of commerce degree (administration). She also holds a master's of business administration degree in health care management, an executive master's degree in business administration (finance) and a postgraduate diploma in international leadership (hospital management). She holds a PhD in Business Administration from Moi University.

== Career ==
She started her career in business administration at AIC Litein Hospital as a hospital administrator. Koros joined Moi Teaching and Referral Hospital where she served as an assistant director of Finance and Administration before joining the Commission for Implementation of the Constitution where she worked as the Director Management Services and the Ag. Secretary/Chief Executive Officer.Previously, from 21 February 2014, she served as the chief executive officer of Kenyatta National Hospital, the largest public hospital in East and Central Africa.

In March 2018, following a series of surgical mishaps at Kenyatta National Hospital, the hospital board suspended Koros and the director of medical services, Dr Bernard Githae, to "allow an audit of KeNH systems".

== See also ==
- Healthcare in Kenya
