= Speaker of the National Assembly of Kenya =

Officer of the Kenyan National Assembly

- Spika wa Bunge la Taifa la Kenya
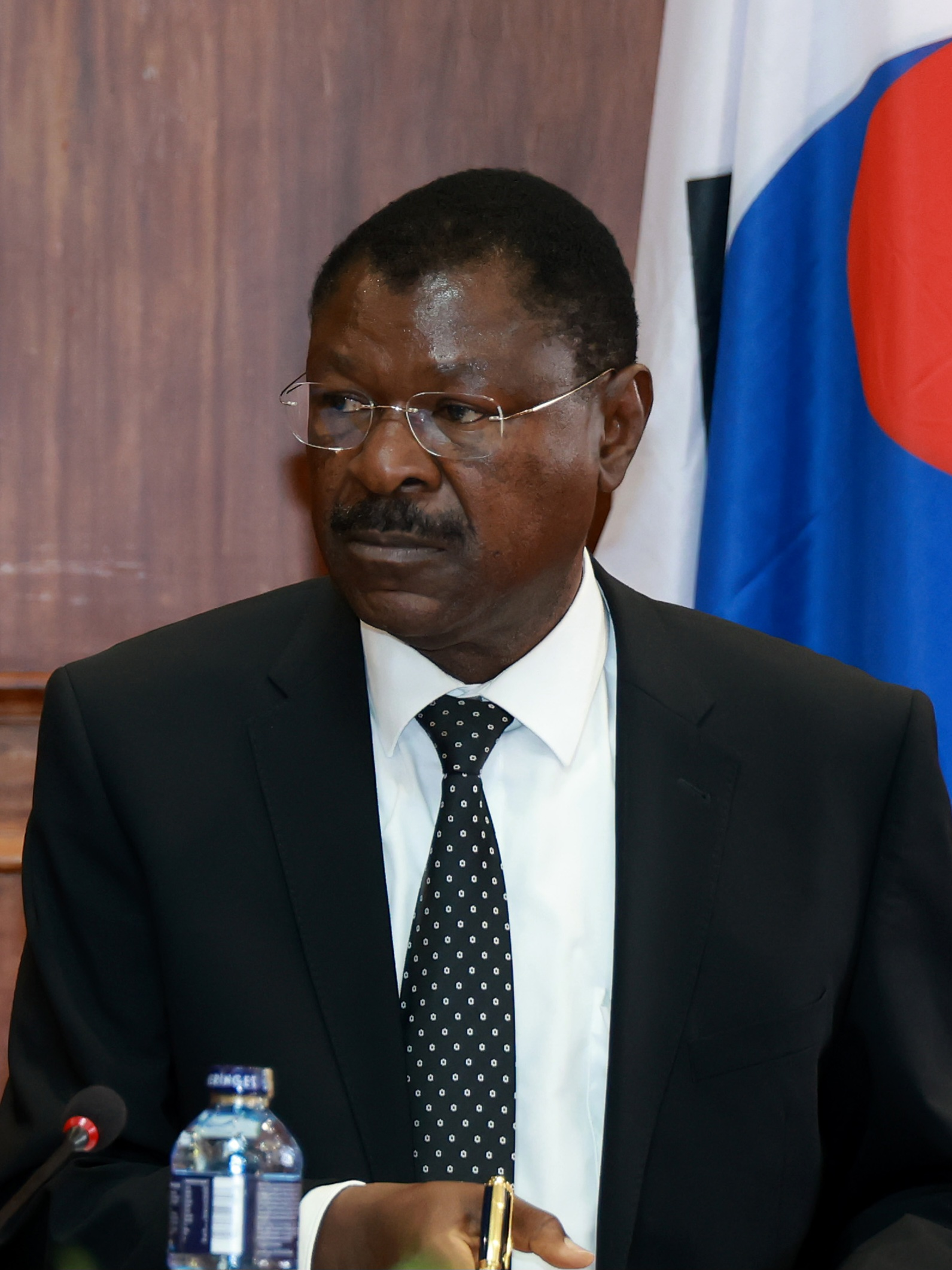
- Incumbent; Moses Wetangula since 8 September 2022
- National Assembly
- Style: Mr. Speaker (informal - male; while presiding the house); Mrs. Speaker (informal - female; while presiding the house); Honourable Speaker (Formal; Inside Kenya) (while in office); His Excellency (Diplomatic; Outside Kenya) (Respected title)
- Type: Speaker
- Status: Presiding officer of the National Assembly (Kenya)
- Member of: Parliament of Kenya
- Reports to: Parliament of Kenya
- Seat: National Assembly, Nairobi, Kenya
- Appointer: Secret ballot, Elected by All Members of Parliament
- Term length: 5 years
- Constituting instrument: Constitution of Kenya
- Inaugural holder: Humphrey Slade (Colonial); Fred Mbiti Gideon Mati (Indigenous)
- Formation: 17 August 1907; 119 years ago
- Deputy: Deputy Speaker of the National Assembly
- Website: Parliament.go.ke

The speaker of the National Assembly of Kenya (Swahili: Spika wa Bunge la Taifa La Kenya) is the presiding officer of the Kenyan National Assembly. From 1966 to 2013 the National Assembly was the unicameral body of the Kenyan Parliament.

== Qualifications ==
The speaker is elected by the National Assembly (Kenya) from among persons who are qualified to be Members of the Parliament. The speaker's term lasts for a period of five years, and primarily comes to an end when a new house of parliament first meets after an election in line with Article 106 of the Constitution of Kenya

== Speakers of the National Assembly of Kenya ==
Speaker	Dates	Party affiliation
Sir Humphrey Slade	1967 – 1970	N/A
Fred Mbiti Gideon Mati	1970 – 1988	APP/KANU
Moses Kiprono arap Keino	1988 – 1991	KANU
Jonathan Kimetet arap Ng'eno	1991 – 1993	KANU
Francis Ole Kaparo	1993 – 2008	KANU
Kenneth Marende	2008 – 2013	ODM
Justin Muturi	2013 – 2022	Jubilee Party
Moses Francis Masika Wetangula	2022 – Present	Ford Kenya (Kenya Kwanza Alliance)

== Bicameral parliament ==
Previously, there were separate speakers of the Senate and the House of Representatives.

=== Speaker of the House of Representatives ===
- Sir Humphrey Slade (1963–1966)

=== Speaker of the Senate ===
- Timothy Chitasi Muinga Chokwe (1963)
- Ekwee Ethuro (2013-2017)
- Ken Lusaka (2017–2022)

Amason Kingi Jeffah (2022 to present) Source:

== Speaker of the Colonial Legislative Council ==
- William K. Horne (1948–1955)
- Ferdinand W. Cavendish-Bentinck (1955–1960)
- Sir Humphrey Slade (1960–1963)
