= Chandarana Records =

Kenyan record company

- Industry: Music & entertainment
- Genre: Various
- Founded: 1958
- Headquarters: Kericho, Kenya
- Key people: A.P. Chandarana
- Products: Music & entertainment
- Owner: A.P. Chandarana (a.k.a - 'Babu wa music shop' to the local)

Chandarana Records is a record company from Kericho, Kenya. The company was known throughout Africa for releasing several thousand 45-rpm singles (on at least 15 different labels) featuring a wide range of Kenyan (Luo, Luhya, Kipsigis, Swahili) and Tanzanian groups.

Founded by A.P. Chandarana, the company, was one of the earliest record companies in Kenya, having been founded in 1958, recorded for many of Kenya's famous singers, including Collela Mazee and Daniel Owino Misiani. The company also recorded for a variety of genres, such as Benga, and sold well and were popular in Tanzania, Malawi, South Africa, Nigeria, Cameroun, and West Africa. The Daily Nation had commented that the company's large success was due to A.P Chandarana's efforts to take Benga music "beyond Luo Nyanza to Nairobi, Central Province and Ukambani."

The company stopped selling copies of the original recordings from their shop in Kericho in 2008.

== See also ==
- Music of Kenya
