= Alfred Kiprato Kerich =

Kenyan politician

Alfred Kiprato arap Kerich was the first Member of Parliament for Belgut Constituency in Kericho County, Kenya. He served for two terms as a member of the National Assembly between 1963 and 1969 and 1974–1979. He hailed from Kaptebeswet Area in Kericho County.
