= Kiptarus Arap Kirior =

Kenyan politician (died 2020)

Kiptarus Arap Kirior (died 3 December 2020) was a Kenyan politician who served as Member of Parliament for Belgut Constituency between 1983 and 1988 and 1992–1997. He also served as an Assistant Minister for Culture and Social Services in Daniel Moi's Regime. He further served as Chairman of the Kenya Sugar Board from 27 March 2012 for a period of 3 years.

Kirior died on 3 December 2020.
