= Kiprono Langat =

Kenyan politician

Jonathan Kiprono Langat Magerer is a Kenyan politician. He is a former member Orange Democratic Movement and was elected to represent the Kipkelion Constituency in the National Assembly of Kenya since the 2007 Kenyan parliamentary election. While in Parliament, he served as Deputy Chief Whip for ODM. He is remembered as one person who continues to serve Kenyans with dedication. On July 1, Langat was nominated as Executive Director of the Orange Democratic Movement, succeeding Janet Ongera. He was forceful ejected from ODMs National Executive Council meeting in October 2014 Hon. Magerer Langat Has continued to Serve the people of kipkelion constituency and Kericho County at large with diligence and dedication. He is seen from season to season participating in various public development initiatives, including fundraisers to build schools and for community development. As a seasoned politician, he has continued to champion for the efforts to revive development projects in the county, and enhance capacity building for his people. Reliable sources says that He will be contesting for the Kericho County Gubernatorial seat in 2022, seeking to succeed Prof. Paul chepkwony.
