= Kericho =

Town in Kericho County, Kenya

Coordinates: 00°22′09″S 35°17′02″E

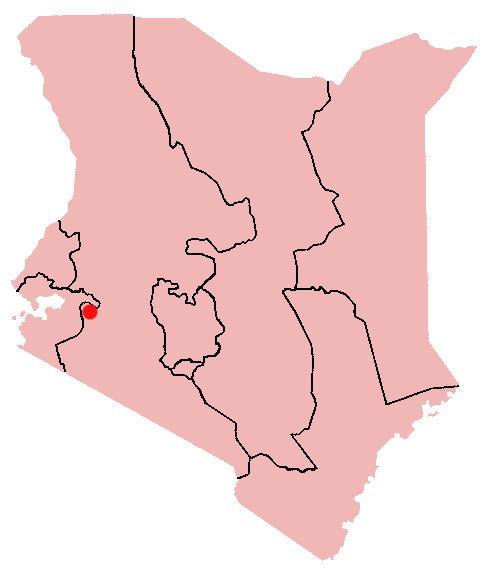
Location of Kericho, Kenya (old provinces pictured)

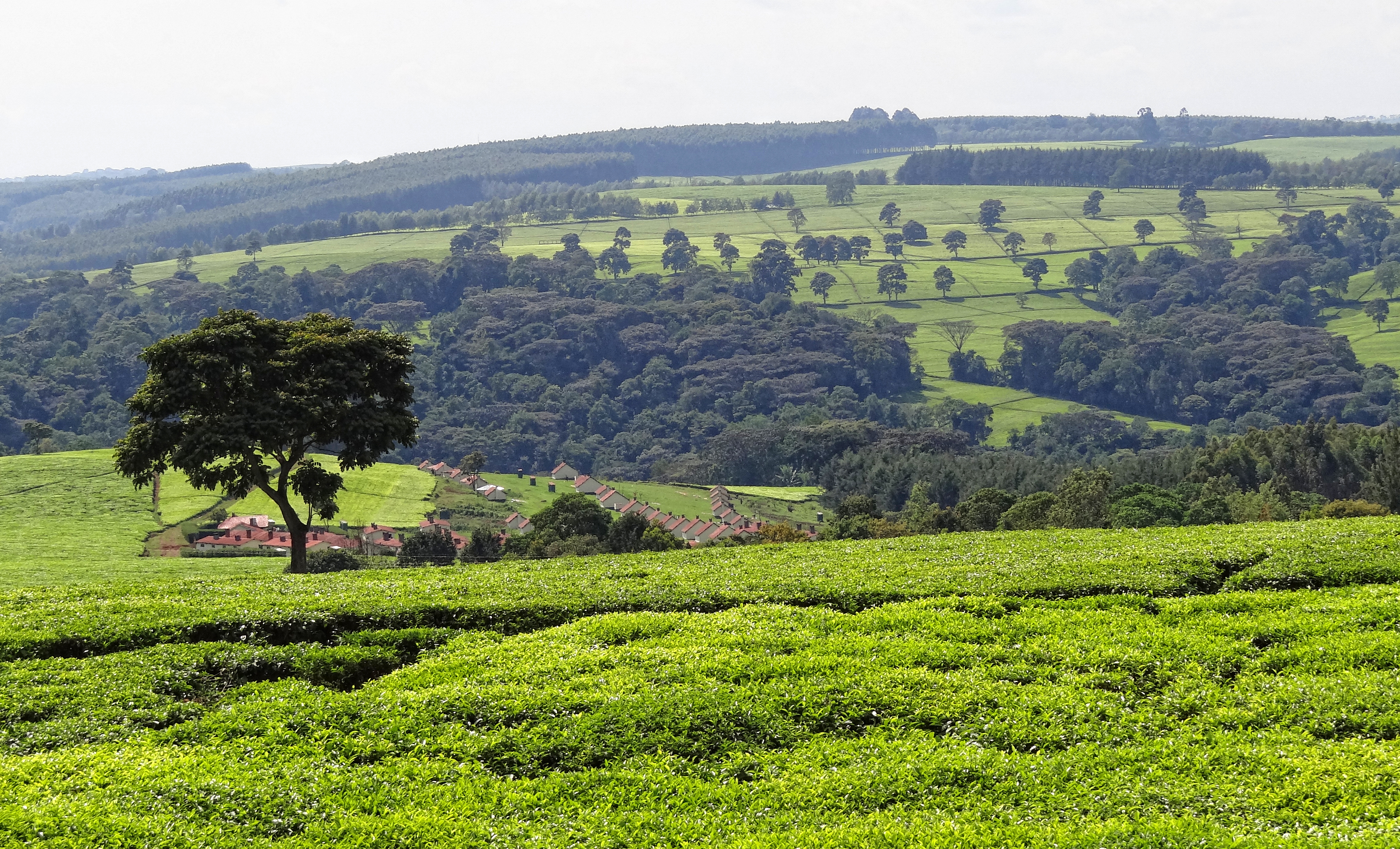
Tea country surrounding Kericho

Kericho is the largest town in Kericho County, located in the highlands west of the Kenyan Rift Valley. Positioned on the edge of the Mau Forest, Kericho benefits from a warm and temperate climate, making it good for agriculture, especially large scale tea cultivation.

The town is located along Kenya's western tourism circuit with access to Lake Victoria, the Maasai Mara National Reserve and Ruma National Park.

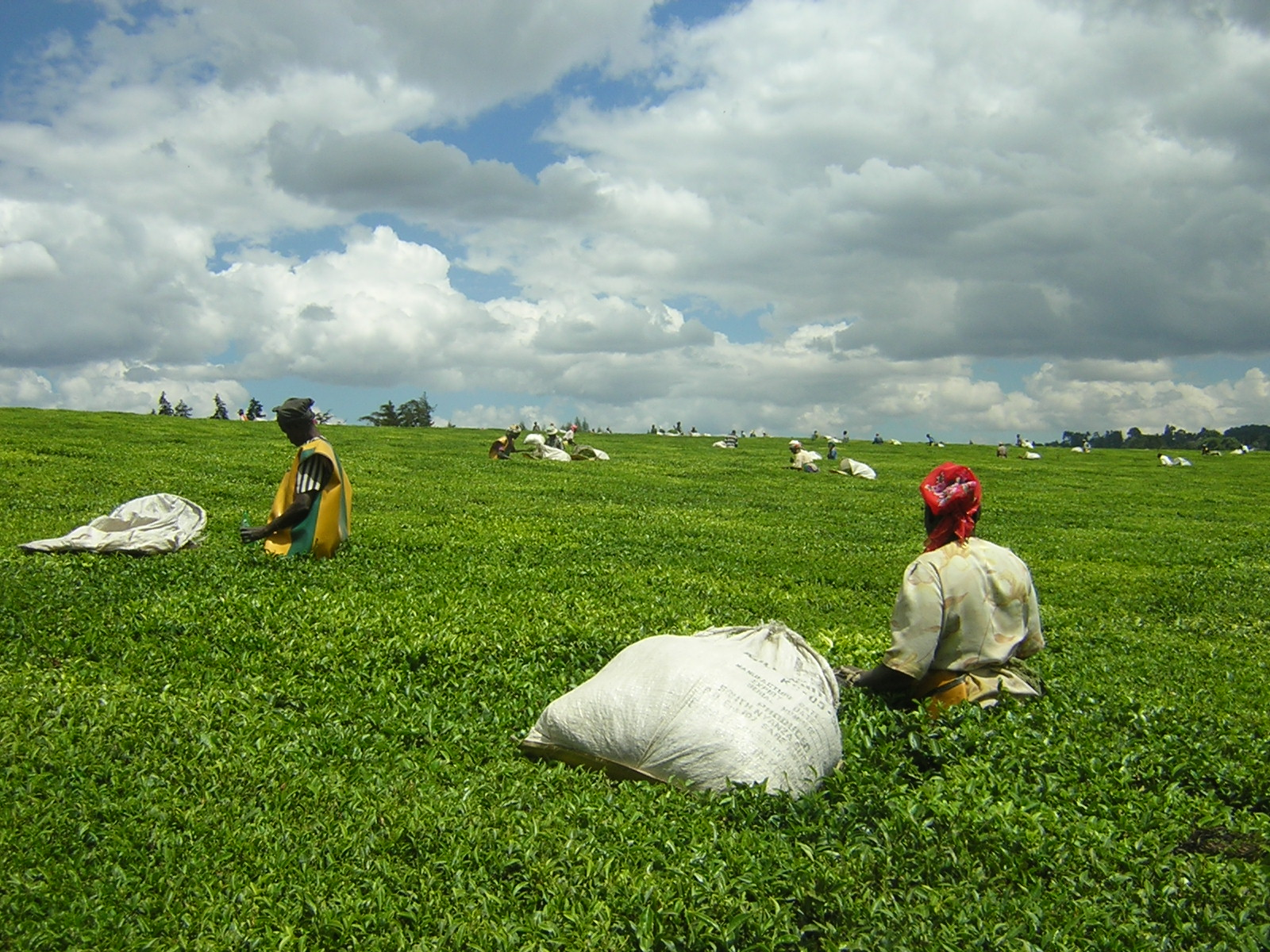
Kericho is home to the world's single largest tea plantation.

== Etymology ==
The etymology of Kericho is uncertain. One theory suggests it that it was named after the region's first hospital, built by the colonial British at the start of the 20th century, referencing the Kipsigis word kerichek, for medicine. Another theory proposes the name derives from a local medicine man called Kipkerich or from a Maasai chief, Ole Kericho, who was killed in the 18th century by the Abagusii.

== History ==
Kericho was founded by British settlers in 1902. It hosts Africa's largest Sikh Gurudwara and the second largest Catholic cathedral in Kenya.

The Gurdwara Sahib, built on the site of the home and workshop of Kericho Wagon Works founder Sant Baba Puran Singh Ji of Kericho, is now a place of worship for the Sikh community and a museum gazetted by the Government of Kenya as a place of spiritual significance.

It is dedicated to the memory of Sant Baba Puran Singh Ji, founder of the international charitable organization, Guru Nanak Nishkam Sewak Jatha which promotes the spirit and practice of selfless service ("nishkam sewa") in the name of Guru Nanak Dev Ji, the founder of the Sikh faith. Chandarana Records a pioneer of Benga music and the Kenyan music recording industry is based in Kericho town.

Kericho is known for its extensive tea plantation and how this plays a huge role in Kenya's economy. The area has a cool climate and fertile soil that is perfect for tea cultivation in large scale farming. Kericho has the leading tea producers like James Finlay and Williamson Tea.

Sports

Kericho is known for producing Olympic-winning long-distance athletes and hosts Zoo Kericho F.C., a football club competing in the Kenyan Premier League, and Kericho R.F.C., competing in the Nationwide League.

Points of Interest

Key attractions include Chagaik Arboretum, Chelimo Arboretum, Tagabi Arboretum, Uhuru Garden and the vast scenic tea estates.

== Geography ==
Kericho is reputed to hold the record for the highest number of hail occurrences in a year, either at 132 days with hail or 113 days in 1965. Kericho has up to 50 days of hail each year, but large hail is rare.

== Population ==
As of the 1999 census, the town had a population of 150,000 people. Kericho is the home town of the Kipsigis, a subgroup of the Kalenjin people.

== Government ==
Kericho town is the administrative headquarters of Kericho county, which consists up of six constituencies/sub-counties: Bureti, Belgut, Ainamoi, Soin/ Sigowet, Kipkelion East, and Kipkelion West.

== Transport ==
Kericho is accessible by road through the B1 road (Kenya) that links Mau-Summit, Kericho to Kisumu and Busia. In addition, the C25 Kapsoit-Sondu road connects Kericho to the A1 road linking Isebania to Lokichoggio through Kisumu and Kitale.

The Nakuru-Kisumu railway line passes through Kericho County with railway stations at Mau Summit, Londiani, Kedowa, Lumbwa, Kipkelion and Fort Ternan. Fort Ternan was previously used as a halfway point for passenger and goods trains between Nakuru and Kisumu.

Private airstrips operated by tea estates are used primarily for crop spraying.

== Communication and media ==
Kericho town has access to high-speed fiber-optic Internet connection, fixed line, and mobile telecommunications.

Local FM radio stations including Kass FM, Chamgei FM, KBC Kitwek FM, Radio Injili, Sayare Radio, Light and Life FM, Sema Radio and The Just FM.

== Tertiary education ==
Kericho hosts several educational institutions offering certificate, diploma and degree courses, including:

- University of Kabianga
- Kenya Highlands Evangelical University run by the Africa Gospel Church
- Kenyatta University
- The University of Nairobi
- Kericho Teachers Training College offers degree courses under agreement with Moi University
- Kenya Forestry College situated in Londiani run by Kenya Forest Service (KFS).
- Eland College run jointly by Kabarak University and Eland Schools
- Mospen Institute of Development Studies(MIDS)
- African Institute of Research and Development Studies (AIRADS)
- Nishkam Saint Puran Singh Institute (NSPSI)
- Kericho Technical Institute
- Kericho School of Professional Studies
- Kenya Institute of Management
- Rift Valley Institute of Business Studies
- Kenya Medical Training College

== Secondary education ==
Kericho is home to: 1.Litein High School, 2.Taita Towett Boys High School, 3.Kipkelion Girls High school, 4.Kapsoit high school, 5.Kabianga Boys High School, 6.Kericho High school, 7.Moi Tea Secondary, 8.Kipsigis Girls High School, 9.Cheptenye Boys High School, 10.Kericho Tea Boys, 11.Tengecha schools 12. Moi Sitotwet 13. Getumbe Secondary school 14. Poiywek Secondary School 15. Kericho Day Secondary school 16. Kipchimchim Secondary school 17. Kaptebeswet secondary school 18. Kabianga Girls High School and others

== Religion ==
Kericho is home to followers of the Africa Gospel Church, Full Gospel Church, Seventh-day Adventists, Catholics, Sikhs, Muslims, Hindus, African Inland Church, Jehovah's Witnesses and Anglicans.

== Notable people ==
- Dr. Taitta Toweett, gave name to Taita Towett High School.
- Joseph Cheruiyot arap Chewen
- Joginder Singh
- Hannington Apudo, the first indigenous military pilot in the Kenya Air Force.
- Wilson Kiprugut
- Moses Kiprono arap Keino
- Joyce Chepchumba
- Edwin Soi
- Kipngeno arap Ng'eny
- David Kimutai Too
- Ayub Kiprotich Siele, the longest serving mayor of Kericho.
- Ruth Chepng'etich, a road runner.
- Michael Madoya (born 1989), footballer
