= Buret District =

Coordinates: 0.5°S 35.25°E

Buret District was a former administrative district in the Rift Valley Province of Kenya. Its capital town was Litein. The district had a population of 316,882 in the 1999 census and an area of 955 km^{2} . The district had two electoral constituencies: Konoin Constituency and Bureti Constituency .

In 2010, the district was split between Kericho County and Bomet County.

Local authorities (councils)
Authority	Type	Population*	Urban pop.*
Litein	Town	83,441	2,628
Sotik	Town	19,877	2,184
Buret	County	213,564	1,139
Total	-	316,882	5,951
* 1999 census. Source:

Administrative divisions
Division	Population*	Urban population*	Population density*	Headquarters
Buret	81,001	2,297	450	Litein
Kimulot	69,168	0	228	
Konoin	61,890	0	338	
Roret	44,971	0	322	
Sotik	59,852	2,390	402	Sotik
Total	316,882	4,687	332 (average)	-
* 1999 census. Sources: , ,
