= Ngetich =

Ngetich is a surname of Kenyan origin that may refer to:

- Dr. Festus Kipkorir Ngetich (born 1973), Kenyan Information Scientist and Library Science Specialist.
- Priscah Ngetich, maiden name of Kenyan long-distance runner Priscah Jepleting Cherono
- Wesley Ngetich Kimutai (1977–2008), Kenyan marathon runner and two-time winner of Grandma's Marathon
- Gladys Ngetich (born c. 1991), Kenyan mechanical and aerospace engineer
- Kipronoh Arap Ngetich (born 1994), Computer Scientist aspiring to be Member of Parliament for Konoin Constituency 2027 elections
- Hillary Ngetich (born 1995), Kenyan middle-distance runner

== See also ==
- Kipngetich
