= Franklin Bett =

Kenyan politician

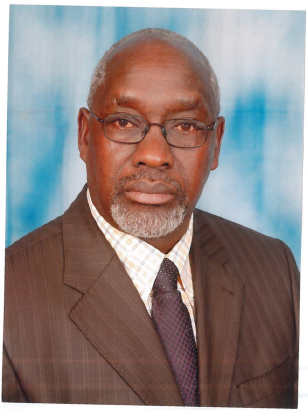
- Born: 23 March 1953 (age 72)
- Other names: Franklin Kipn'getich Bett, Chepkooit
- Occupation: Politician

Franklin Kipn'getich Bett alias (Chepkooit) (born 23 March 1953) is a Kenyan politician. He is the chairman of the Agricultural Finance Corporation (AFC) after President Uhuru Kenyatta appointed him to the position. He belongs to the Jubilee Alliance Party and was elected to represent the Bureti Constituency in the National Assembly of Kenya in the Kenyan parliamentary election, 2007.

== Early life and education ==
Franklin Kipng’etich Bett, also known as Chepkooit to his supporters, was born on 23 March 1953 in Kiptiriri Village, Cheborge, in the larger Kericho District. He was enrolled in Cheborge Primary School in 1960 and later moved to Korongoi Primary School in 1963 where he graduated top of his class in 1968.

He was selected to join Tenwek High School in 1969, then a mission school under the auspices of the World Gospel Missionaries. Some of Bett's notable co-alumni of Tenwek High School include Mark Kipkemoi Bor, Permanent Secretary in the Ministry of Public Health and Sanitation, his close friend and predecessor at the Ministry of Roads Kipkalya Kones, Dr. Bishop Rono, Ambassador John Koech, Josephat Nanok and many other leaders in business, politics and academia.

Bett graduated from Tenwek High School in 1972 with Division 1, the highest grade possible in the then Kenya Certificates of Examination (O-level).

In 1973, he proceeded to Shimo la Tewa High School in Mombasa for his Kenya Advanced Certificate of Education (KACE) where he attained three principals in history, geography, economics and a subsidiary in general paper upon graduation from the school in 1974.

After graduation, Bett went back home where he founded Tebesonik Secondary School and served briefly as its first head teacher before joining the University of Nairobi to pursue an undergraduate degree in commerce (accounting). He graduated in 1979.

== Public service ==
After graduating, Bett joined the civil service where he built a career that culminated in his appointment as an Assistant Secretary at the Treasury in 1987. His seniors at the time included Simeon Nyachae, a one-time finance minister, Chief Secretary and businessman; and Jeremiah Kiereini who too was once a Chief Secretary, Head of the Civil Service and Secretary to the Cabinet.

After his resignation, he worked briefly with the Federation of Kenya. Employers before the then president Daniel arap Moi recalled him back to government and assigned him the Supplies Branch of the Ministry of Roads and Public Works. Soon after, Moi once again tapped him for the position of Deputy State House Comptroller. His main duties were speech and report writing.

He worked in the position until 1996 when he was promoted to the position of State House Comptroller upon the retirement of Abraham Kiptanui, for whom he was a deputy. He held this role for two years until, in 1998, he was demoted to a Permanent Secretary in the Ministry of Environmental Conservation.

== Political career ==
In early 2002, Bett was approached by Raila Odinga to join him in a new political party - the Liberal Democratic Party (LDP) and he acquiesced.

When LDP joined hands with the Mwai Kibaki-led NAK to form NARC, Bett was entrusted with the responsibility of coordinating its activities in the South Rift. In spite of the fact that South Rift had been a KANU bastion for the four decades since independence, Bett's team was able to claw back substantial ground for NARC. As the historic 2002 election votes trickled in, his input was manifest in the numerous civic seats, impressive performance by parliamentary candidates on its ticket and thousands of votes for its presidential candidate Kibaki who eventually was declared the winner. Unlike many leaders from the region, Bett's judgment carried the day. The NARC government nominated him as a member of parliament in 2003 and was subsequently elected to chair the Parliamentary Select Committee on Agriculture, Land and Natural Resources. With him at the helm, the committee sponsored many bills and motions with the Forest Act of 2005 being its most remarkable. The committee is remembered for vehemently opposing the introduction of GMOs in the country.

The year 2005 saw Bett and Henry Kosgey leading the people of Rift Valley to join the rest of the country in rejecting a what they termed a 'watered-down' draft constitution in that year's referendum. In 2007, Bett contested the Buret Constituency parliamentary seat on an ODM ticket and won. He garnered 43,000 votes against his nearest competitor Paul Sang of KANU who managed got 7,000 votes.

From his contributions on the floor of the House, he was able to nudge the government into putting up a pineapple processing plant in Roret and the Tiriitab-Moita-based Bureti Technical Institute, both projects are still underway. Other projects are Kapkatet Stadium that is being modernised alongside the Sotik-Cheborge-Roret-Sigowet and Litein-Kibugat roads that are being upgraded with bitumen.

Following the demise of Kipkalya Kones, he was appointed to replace him as Minister for Roads in February 2009. His stewardship at the Ministry of Roads has seen a rapid expansion of roads infrastructure in all parts of the country. The Thika Superhighway became a reality under his charge.

== Personal life ==
Bett is fond of travelling for business and leisure. He has visited over 70 countries and has close business and political contacts in Australia, United States and United Kingdom. He has five daughters and four sons.
