= Paul Chepkwony =

Kenyan politician and professor

Paul Kiprono Chepkwony

Governor of Kericho County
- Incumbent
- Assumed office 2013-2022
- President: Uhuru Kenyatta

Personal details
- Born: Ainamoi, Kenya
- Party: United Republican Party
- Occupation: Politician; professor

Paul Chepkwony (born in Ainamoi, Kenya) is a Kenyan politician and professor. He was the governor of Kericho County in Kenya. Chepkwony is a member of Jubilee Party.

== Education ==
Paul Chepkwony finished from Kericho High School in 1988. In 1989 he enrolled at Jomo Kenyatta University of Agriculture and Technology and in 1992 he graduated with a bachelor's degree in Chemistry. In 1993 he attended the University of Nairobi and graduated with Masters in Chemistry in 1996. He again attended Jomo Kenyatta University of Agriculture and Technology in 1999 and in 2002 he finished with a PhD in organic chemistry.

== Career ==
Chepkwony began his career as a lecturer at Moi University, where he served for four years. In 2009 he was made an associate professor at Moi University. In 2013 he officially went into politics and became a member of United Republican Party. That same year he ran for Governor of Kericho County and was elected into office. He later joined Jubilee Party and was reelected as Governor of Kericho County during the 2017 elections.

== Scandal ==
In June 2018, Chepkwony was accused of being in a relationship with his deputy Susan Kikwai, an accusation that has never been proved. Among other allegations were his involvement in misuse of public funds, nepotism and being romantically involved with his students at the university, that all turned out to be false allegations.
