= Körös (disambiguation) =

Körös is a river in Hungary and Romania.

Körös can also refer to:

- SMS Körös, the name ship of the Körös-class river monitors built for the Austro-Hungarian Navy

== See also ==
- Körös culture, a Neolithic archaeological culture in Central Europe that was named after the river Körös
- Koros (disambiguation)
- Kőrös (disambiguation)
