= Koro =

Koro may refer to:

== Geography ==
- Koro Island, a Fijian island
- Koro Sea, in the Pacific Ocean
- Koro, Ivory Coast
- Koro, Mali
- Koro, Wisconsin, United States, an unincorporated community

== Languages ==
- Koro language (India), an endangered Sino-Tibetan language spoken in Arunachal Pradesh, India
- Koro language (New Guinea)
- Koro language (Vanuatu)
- Koro, a variety of the Maninka language spoken in Ivory Coast

== Polynesian culture ==
- 'Oro, a god in Polynesian mythology
- Koro (literally, "grandfather"), a term of respect in the Māori language for a male Kaumātua (tribal elder)

== Other uses ==
- Kōrō, a masculine Japanese given name
- KORO, a Spanish-language television station in Corpus Christi, Texas, USA
- Koro (incense burner), a Japanese incense burner
- Koro (disease), the syndrome in which someone believes their external genitals are retracting
- Koro Wachi language, spoken in Nigeria
- Musiliu Obanikoro, popularly known as Koro
- Nkoroo language, Nigeria
