= 1963 Kenyan general election =

- 18–26 May 1963
- House of Representatives
- All 129 seats in the House of Representatives; 65 seats needed for a majority
Party	Leader	Vote %	Seats	+/–
KANU	Jomo Kenyatta	53.60	83	+64
KADU	Ronald Ngala	25.83	33	+22
APP	Paul Ngei	7.43	8	New
This lists parties that won seats. See the complete results below.
- Senate
- All 38 seats in the Senate; 20 seats needed for a majority
Party	Leader	Vote %	Seats	+/–
KANU	Jomo Kenyatta	59.18	18	New
KADU	Ronald Ngala	27.31	16	New
APP	Paul Ngei	8.46	2	New
NPAU		–	1	New
Independents	–	4.73	1	New
This lists parties that won seats. See the complete results below.
Results for the House (left) and Senate (right)
Prime Minister before	Prime Minister after election
Jomo Kenyatta; KANU	Jomo Kenyatta; KANU

General elections were held in Kenya Colony between 18 and 26 May 1963. Voters elected members of the House of Representatives and Senate. The election was the last before independence later in the year.

The result was a victory for the Kenya African National Union (KANU), which won 83 of the 124 seats in the House of Representatives and 18 of the 38 seats in the Senate. Five seats in the House and three in the Senate remained unfilled due to a secessionist conflict on the border with Somalia.

== Campaign ==
A total of 275 candidates contested the elections for the House of Representatives; 90 from KANU, 59 from the Kenya African Democratic Union (KADU), 20 from the African People's Party (APP), five from the Baluhya Political Union (BPU), three from the Coast People's Party and 98 independents.

KADU, the APP and the BPU agreed to work together to try to defeat KANU.

== Conduct ==
Pre-election violence occurred in Kangundo when a group of Kamba attacked KANU supporters, injuring fourteen people. Eleven people were arrested after KADU supporters were attacked outside party offices in Kitale.

== Results ==
=== House of Representatives ===
Party	Votes	%	Seats			
Party	Votes	%	Constituency	National	Total	+/–
Kenya African National Union	988,311	53.60	72	11	83	+64
Kenya African Democratic Union	476,218	25.83	32	1	33	+22
African People's Party	137,008	7.43	8	0	8	New
Baluhya Political Union	14,896	0.81	0	0	0	−1
Coast People's Party	9,135	0.50	0	0	0	0
Independents	218,311	11.84	0	0	0	New
Vacant			5	−	5	−
Total	1,843,879	100.00	117	12	129	+96
Registered voters/turnout	2,583,000	–				
Source: EISA, Sternberger et al.

=== Senate ===
The Nyanza Province African Union won its seat unopposed, whilst KANU (five) and KADU (four) won a further nine unopposed.

Party	Votes	%	Seats
Kenya African National Union	1,028,906	59.18	18
Kenya African Democratic Union	474,933	27.31	16
African People's Party	147,039	8.46	2
Baluhya Political Union	5,520	0.32	0
Nyanza Province African Union			1
Independents	82,328	4.73	1
Total	1,738,726	100.00	38
Valid votes	1,738,726	99.56	
Invalid/blank votes	7,662	0.44	
Total votes	1,746,388	100.00	
Registered voters/turnout	2,583,000	67.61	
Source: EISA
