= Kőrös =

Kőrös may refer to:

- Kőrös, the Hungarian name of Križevci, Croatia
- Endre Kőrös (1927–2002), Hungarian chemist

== See also ==
- The historic Belovár-Kőrös County or Bjelovar-Križevci County, named for Križevci
- Körös (disambiguation)
