= Humphrey Slade =

1st Speaker of the National Assemnly of Kenya

The Honourable Humphrey Slade EBS, KBE

Speaker of the Kenyan National Assembly
- In office 1967–1970
- Preceded by: Position established
- Succeeded by: Fred Mbiti Gideon Mati

Speaker of the Kenyan House of Representatives
- In office 1963–1967
- Preceded by: Position established
- Succeeded by: Position abolished

Speaker of the Kenyan Legislative Council
- In office 1960–1963
- Preceded by: Ferdinand Cavendish-Bentinck
- Succeeded by: Position abolished

Personal details
- Born: 4 May 1905 London, England
- Died: 13 August 1983 (aged 78) Nairobi, Kenya
- Party: Independent
- Education: Eton College; Magdalen College, Oxford

Humphrey Slade, EBS, KBE (4 May 1905 – 13 August 1983) was a British-born Kenyan lawyer and politician who served as a member of the Legislative Council and later the National Assembly between 1952 and 1970. He was the inaugural Speaker of the National Assembly, from 1967 to 1970.

== Biography ==
Slade was born in Kensington, London to George Slade, a solicitor, and his wife Edith Beale. He was a King's Scholar at Eton College and later read jurisprudence at Magdalen College, Oxford. He completed his articles with Gibson and Weldon and qualified as a solicitor in 1930.

He migrated to Kenya in October 1930 and practised as a lawyer with Hamilton Harrison and Mathews in Nairobi. When the Second World War broke out in 1939, he was made Deputy Judge Advocate of the East African Forces, remaining in the position until 1941. In 1945, whilst still in Kenya, he came of the roll of solicitors in England and Wales in order to gain a call to the bar at Lincoln's Inn.

In 1952, he was elected to the Legislative Council from the Aberdares constituency. He served as speaker of the Legislative Council from 1960 until Kenyan independence in 1963. He then served as speaker of the newly established House of Representatives between 1963 and 1967, and that latter year he was unanimously elected as the inaugural Speaker of the National Assembly of Kenya. He retired from public life in 1970 and died in Nairobi in 1983.
