= Ndanai =

- Location within Kenya
- Coordinates: 0.83°S 35.1°E
- Country: Kenya
- Province: Bomet County
- Time zone: UTC+3 (EAT)

Ndanai is a settlement in Kenya's Rift Valley Province.
