= Kórós =

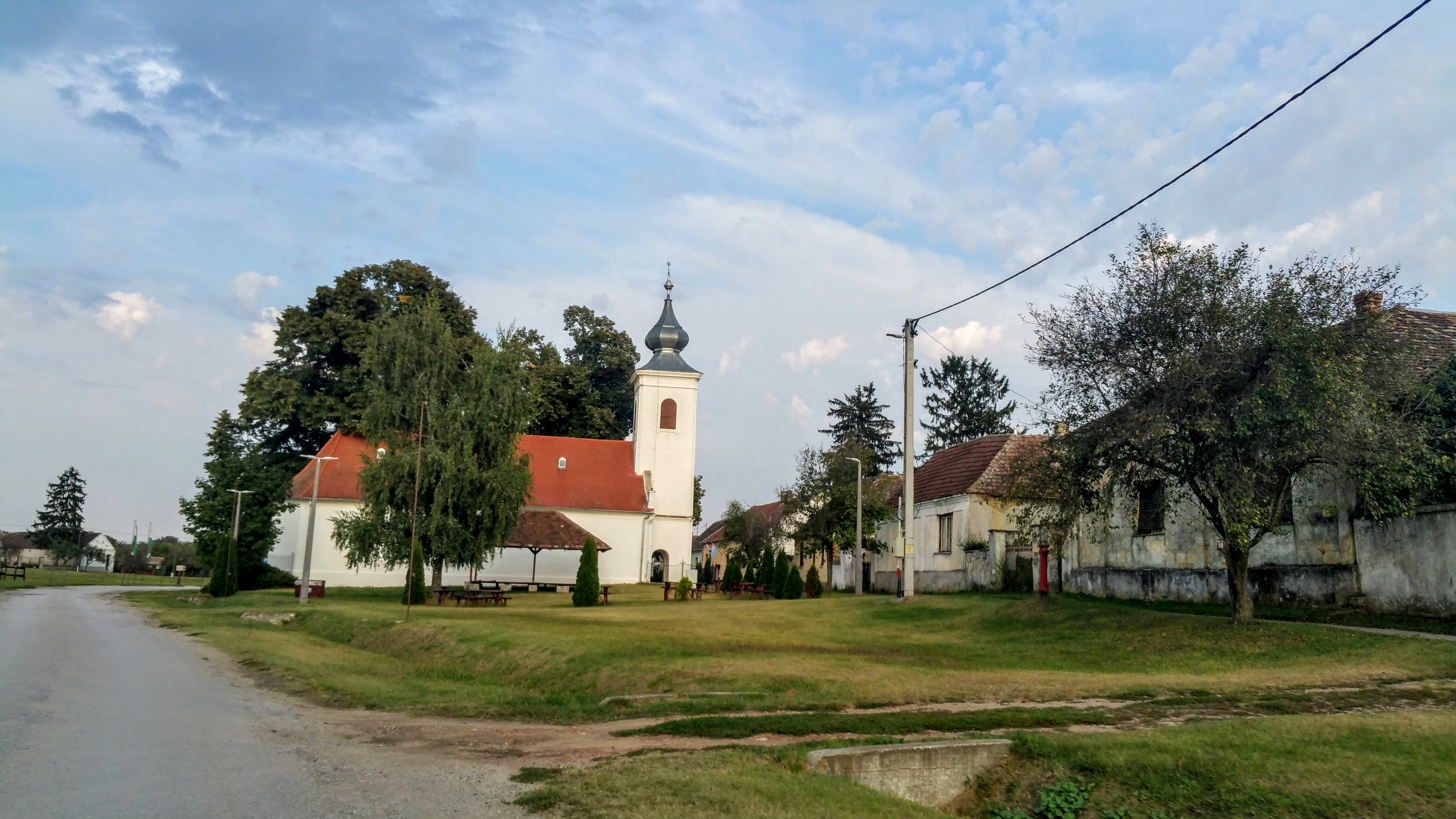

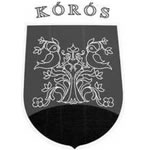
- Coat of arms

- Location of Kórós in Hungary
- Coordinates: 45°52′01″N 18°04′57″E
- Country: Hungary
- Region: Southern Transdanubia
- County: Baranya
- Subregion: Sellyei
- Rank: Village

Area
  - Total: 15.12 km^{2} (5.84 sq mi)

Population (1 January 2008)
  - Total: 234
  - Density: 15.5/km^{2} (40.1/sq mi)
- Time zone: UTC+1 (CET)
  - Summer (DST): UTC+2 (CEST)
- Postal code: 7841
- Area code: +36 73
- KSH code: 08110

Kórós is a village in Hungary, Baranya county, in the Ormánság region. The village lies near the river Drava. The Calvinist church of Kórós is famous for its painted ceiling, which is considered a masterpiece of Hungarian folk art.
