= Gotani =

- Location within Kenya
- Coordinates: 3.78°S 39.53°E
- Country: Kenya
- Province: Coast Province
- Time zone: UTC+3 (EAT)

Gotani is a settlement in Kenya's Coast Province. During the 1940s it was a major hub for the illegal ivory trade.
