= Full Gospel Church =

Historic church in Washington, United States

- U.S. National Register of Historic Places
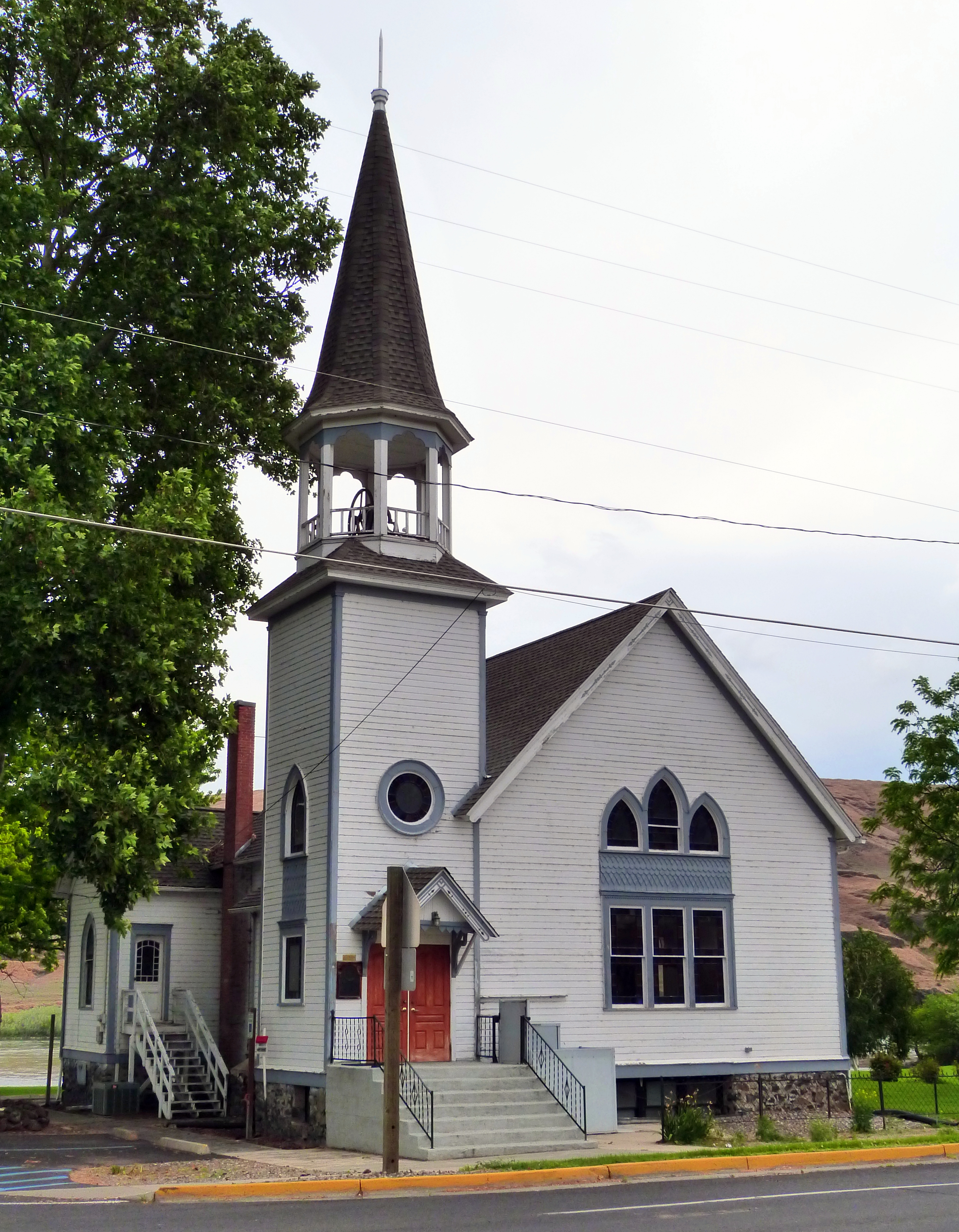
- The Full Gospel Church in 2015

- Location within Washington (state) Location within the United States
- Location: 305 1st Street, Asotin, Washington
- Coordinates: 46°20′28″N 117°03′05″W
- Area: 1 acre (0.40 ha)
- Built: 1899
- Architectural style: Carpenter Gothic
- NRHP reference No.: 72001266
- Added to NRHP: January 19, 1972

The Full Gospel Church, also known as Grace Presbyterian Church, is a historic church building in Asotin, Washington. It was built in 1899, and was added to the National Register of Historic Places in 1972.
