= Kipkelion West Constituency =

Parliamentary Constituency in Kenya

Kipkelion West
- Constituency
- Location within Kenya
- Coordinates: 0.1999222°S 35.464728°E
- Country: Kenya
- County: Kericho County

Government
  - Member of parliament: Hillary Kiplangat Koskei

Kipkelion West is a constituency in Kenya. It is one of six constituencies in Kericho County. It was split from the now defunct Kipkelion Constituency to create two constituencies that are Kipkelion West and Kipkelion East after the promulgation of the New Constitution in 2010.

Kipkelion West is made up of four wards namely Kipkelion ward, Kunyak Ward, Kamasian Ward, and Chilchila ward. Main economic activities in the constituency are coffee growing and dairy farming.

== Members of Parliament ==
Elections	MP	Party
2013	Rob Jackson Kipkorir	URP
2017	Hilary Kosgei	Jubilee
2022	Hillary Kosgei	UDA

== See also ==
- Ainamoi Constituency
- Belgut Constituency
- Kipkelion East Constituency
