= Kōrō =

- Gender: Male

Origin
- Origin: Japanese
- Meaning: Different meanings depending on the kanji used

Kōrō, Koro or Kourou (written: 光郎, 光朗, 耕郎 or 浩郎) is a masculine Japanese given name. Notable people with the name include:

- Koro Bessho (別所 浩郎; born 1953), Japanese diplomat
- Kōrō Honjō (本庄 光郎; 1907–1995), Japanese photographer
- Koro Kawazu (河津 光朗; born 1940), Japanese long jumper
- Kōrō Sasaki (佐々木 耕郎; 1895–1978), Japanese politician
