= Chemaner =

- Location within Kenya
- Coordinates: 0.78°S 35.5°E
- Country: Kenya
- Province: Rift Valley Province
- Time zone: UTC+3 (EAT)

Chemaner is a settlement in Kenya's Rift Valley Province.
