= Sigowet–Soin Constituency =

Electoral constituency in Kericho County, Kenya

Sigowet-Soin is an electoral constituency in Kericho County, Kenya. Its one of six Constituencies of Kericho County. It was created for 2013 General Elections after it being curved out of Belgut Constituency. First member of Parliament was Justice Kemei and currently the sitting MP for the constituency is Justice Kemei

Elections	Member of Parliament	Party	Notes
2013	Justice Kipsang Kemei	URP	1st MP for Sigowet-Soin
2017	Kipsengeret Koros	Independent	2nd MP for Sigowet-Soin
2022	Justice Kipsang Kemei	UDA	3rd MP

It has four County Assembly Wards namely:

== County Assembly Wards in Sigowet – Soin Constituency ==
=== Sigowet Ward ===
1. County Assembly Ward No.: 0962
2. County Assembly Ward Name: Sigowet
3. County Assembly Ward Population (Approx.): 36,175
4. County Assembly Ward Area In Sq. km (Approx.): 72.80
5. County Assembly Ward Description: Comprises Sigowet, Kaptebengwo, Kamaget, Kebeneti, Mindililwet, Kiptere, Kapkeburu and Cheptuiyet sub–Locations of Kericho County

Kaplelartet Ward

Ward No.: 0963

1. County Assembly Ward Name: Kaplelartet
2. County Assembly Ward Population (Approx.): 51,753
3. County Assembly Ward Area In Sq. km (Approx.): 109.40
4. County Assembly Ward Description: Comprises Kaplelartet, Kalyangowet, Singorok, Iraa, Motiret, Tabaita, Chepkemel and KAPSOMBOCH Sub–Locations of Kericho County

=== Soliat Ward ===
1. County Assembly Ward No.: 0964
2. County Assembly Ward Name: Soliat
3. County Assembly Ward Population (Approx.): 16,124
4. County Assembly Ward Area In Sq. km (Approx.): 101.00
5. County Assembly Ward Description: Comprises Baregeiwet, Kaitui, Kiptugumo, Kapsegut, Chesiche, Kabokyek, Lekwenyi, Kapkara, Kapsorok, Motero, Soliat, Kamasega and Kong’eren sub–Location of Kericho County

=== Soin Ward ===
- County Assembly Ward No.: 0965
- County Assembly Ward Name: Soin
- County Assembly Ward Population (Approx.): 21,072
- County Assembly Ward Area In Sq. km (Approx.): 192.90
- County Assembly Ward Description: Comprises Simbi, Kaplelach, Kipsitet, Kapchebwai, Koitaborut, Kapkormon, Kejiriet and Kaptalamwa Sub–Locations of Kericho County
