= Londiani =

Town in Kericho County, Kenya

- Town
- Location within Kenya
- Coordinates: 00°10′00″S 35°36′00″E
- Country: Kenya
- County: Kericho
- Constituency: Kipkelion East
- Elevation: 2,325 m (7,628 ft)

Population (2009)
  - Total: 44,953
- Time zone: UTC+3:00 (EAT)

Londiani is a town in Kericho County, Kenya. It is 49 km from Kericho, which is about a 50-minute drive. As of 2009, it had a total population of 44,953.

== Transport ==
Londiani is located in the Kipkelion East Constituency between Nakuru and Kericho, off Nakuru-Eldoret highway about one hour drive from Nakuru town.

The town borders the Londiani Forest and contains a forestry station managed by the Kenya Forestry Service.

The Nairobi-Kisumu railway also passes through the town. The Londiani-Fort Ternan-Koru-Muhoroni (C35) road goes through Londiani enabling travel from Nakuru to Kisumu, without going through Kericho.

== Geography ==
Londiani town lies approximately 2,325 m above sea level.

The town borders Mt. Londiani (2,848 m). This mountain is also referred to as Mount Kipsigis, Tuluap-Kipsigis by the locals and was called Mount Blackett by the British colonial authorities. The site was gazetted as a cultural heritage site of great significance to the Kipsigis community.

== History ==
The British colonial authorities constructed a railway line passing through the town, from Nairobi to Kisumu.

There was also a sawmill near the town, called Mount Blackett Sawmills

== Administration and Finance ==
Londiani town hosts various administrative and financial offices:

- Londiani Ward office
- Rift Valley Eco-Region Research Programme
- Londiani Police Station
- Assistant County Commissioner
- Kenya Commercial Bank
- Kenya Women Finance Trust

== Education ==
Several institutions are found within and around the town:

- Londiani Boys High School
- Londiani Girls High School
- Sacred Hills Girls High School.

== Healthcare ==
Londiani town has the Londiani District Hospital, which offers outpatient and inpatient services, mother and child healthcare, family planning, antenatal care, immunization and nutrition services. The hospital also has an operation theatre.

Londiani is also the site of the proposed Londiani Referral Hospital, which will serve the South Rift region, including Kericho, Bomet and Narok counties.
