= 1988 Kenyan general election =

← 1983	21 March 1988	1992 →
- Presidential election
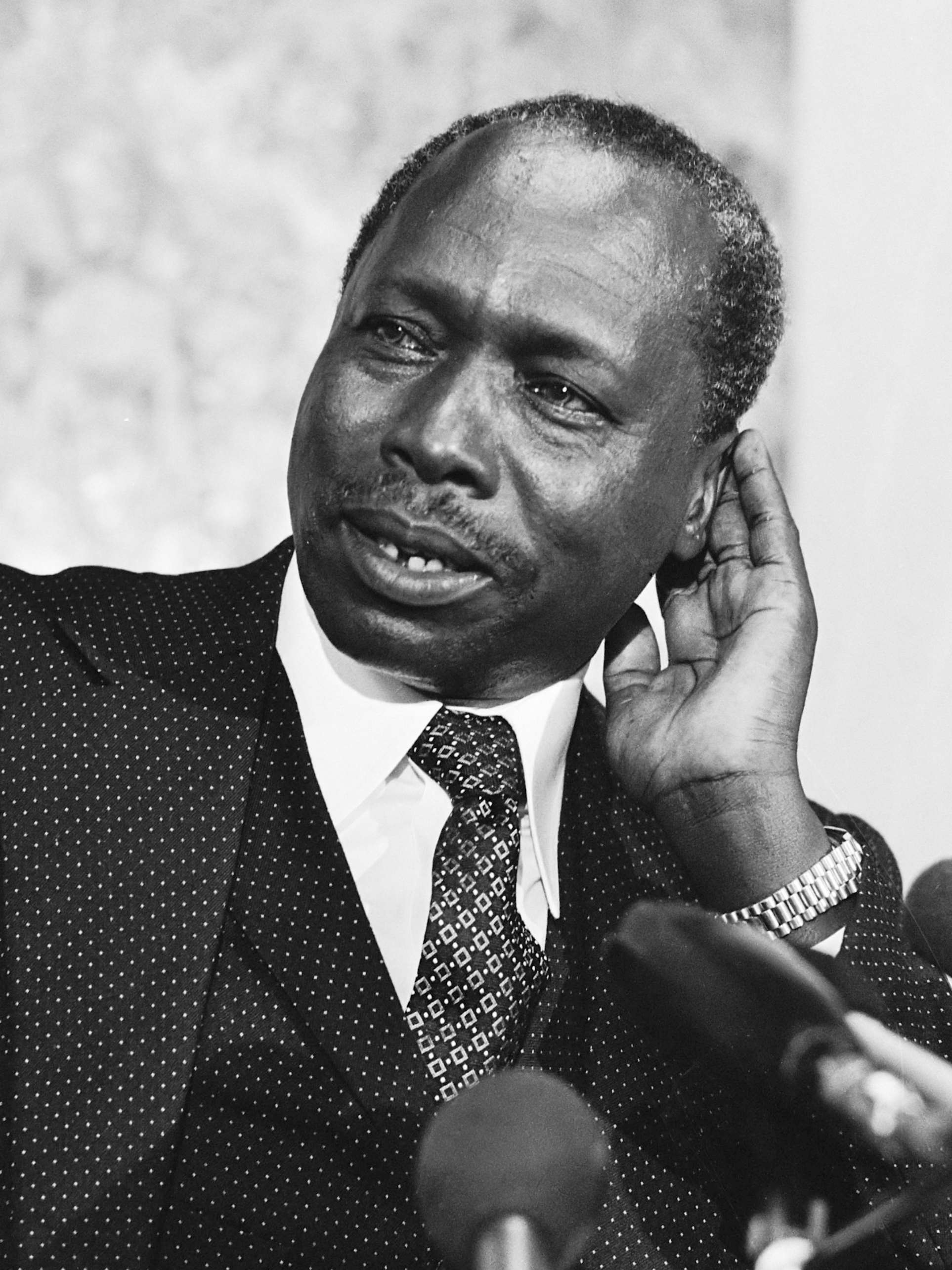
Candidate	Daniel arap Moi
Party	KANU
Electoral vote	Elected uncontested
President before election
Daniel arap Moi
Elected President
Daniel arap Moi
- Parliamentary election
Party	Leader	Vote %	Seats	+/–
KANU	Daniel arap Moi	100	188	+30
This lists parties that won seats. See the complete results below.
Speaker of the National Assembly before	Speaker of the National Assembly after
Fred Mbiti Gideon Mati; KANU	Moses Kiprono arap Keino; KANU

General elections were held in Kenya on 21 March 1988. At the time the county was a one-party state with the Kenya African National Union as the sole legal party. The size of the National Assembly was expanded from 158 to 188 seats prior to the elections. Although the post of President of Kenya was due to be elected at the same time as the National Assembly, Daniel arap Moi was the sole candidate and was automatically elected without a vote being held. Following the elections, a further 12 members were appointed by President Moi.

== Background ==
In February 1988 a new system was introduced for the primary elections of KANU candidates. The mlolongo or queue system involved party members lining up behind photographs of their preferred candidate. In a country of 20 million people, 4,528,480 were KANU members, and there were accusations that the mlolongo system resulted in voter intimidation and fraud during the primaries. Beyond, a church-based magazine was banned after it condemned the public voting as "a mockery of justice."

== Results ==
Party	Votes	%	Seats	+/–
Kenya African National Union	2,231,229	100.00	188	+30
Appointed members			12	0
Total	2,231,229	100.00	200	+30
Valid votes	2,231,229	98.54		
Invalid/blank votes	33,152	1.46		
Total votes	2,264,381	100.00		
Registered voters/turnout	5,562,981	40.70		
Source: IPU

== Aftermath ==
At the first meeting of newly elected Assembly in April 1988, Fred Mbiti Gideon Mati, who had been Speaker since 1970, resigned, and the National Assembly elected Moses Kiprono arap Keino as his replacement.
