= Fred Mbiti Gideon Mati =

2nd Speaker of the National Assembly of Kenya

The Honourable Fredrick Mbiti Gideon Mati EBS

2nd Speaker of the National Assembly of Kenya
- In office 6 February 1970 – 1988
- Preceded by: Humphrey Slade
- Succeeded by: Moses Kiprono arap Keino
- Constituency: Kitui County

Minister for Health and Housing
- In office 1963–?
- President: Jomo Kenyatta

Member of the Legislative Council of Kenya
- In office 1961–1963
- Constituency: Kitui North

Personal details
- Born: Kitui, Kenya
- Died: Nairobi, Kenya
- Party: KANU

Fredrick Mbiti Gideon Mati was the first African and longest serving Speaker of the Kenyan Parliament, having been elected speaker on 6 February 1970, taking over from Humphrey Slade, and serving until April 1988.

Mati was the Minister for Health and Housing in the coalition government prior to Kenya's independence in 1963. He was also a member of the Legislative Council of Kenya from 1961 and the first MP for Kitui North, now current Kitui County, having studied at Migwani D.E.B primary school, serving from 1963 to his election as Speaker in 1970.

He was one of the first two people from Ukambani to receive a university degree.
