= 1974 Kenyan general election =

- 14 October 1974
- Presidential election
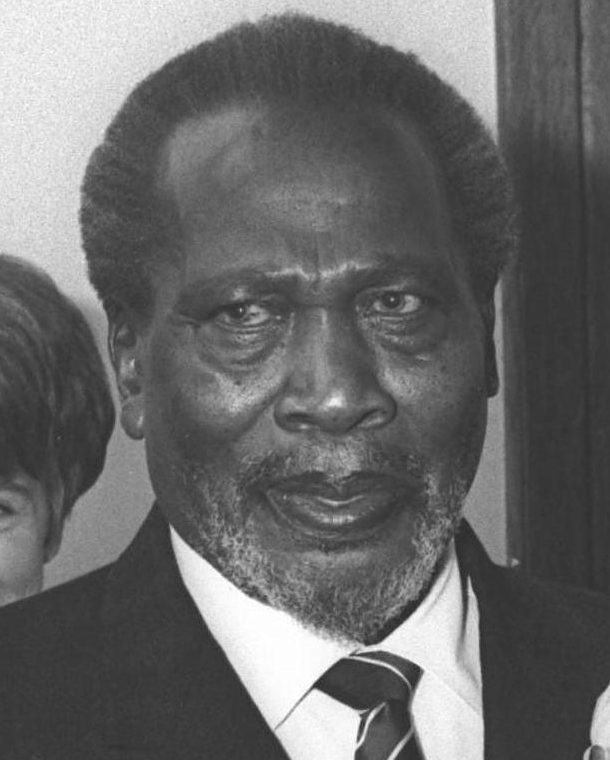
Candidate	Jomo Kenyatta
Party	KANU
President before election
Jomo Kenyatta
Elected President
Jomo Kenyatta
- Parliamentary election
Party	Leader	Vote %	Seats	+/–
KANU	Jomo Kenyatta	100	158	0
This lists parties that won seats. See the complete results below.
Speaker of the National Assembly before	Speaker of the National Assembly after
Humphrey Slade; KANU	Humphrey Slade; KANU

General elections were held in Kenya on 14 October 1974. At the time, the country was a de facto one-party state with the Kenya African National Union being the sole party to participate in the election. 740 KANU candidates stood for the 158 National Assembly seats, with 88 incumbents (including four ministers) defeated. Voter turnout was 56.5%. Although the post of President of Kenya was due to be elected at the same time as the National Assembly, Jomo Kenyatta was the sole candidate and was automatically elected without a vote being held. Following the election, a further 12 members were appointed by Kenyatta.

== Results ==
Party	Votes	%	Seats	+/–
Kenya African National Union	2,627,308	100.00	158	0
Appointed members			12	0
Total	2,627,308	100.00	170	0
Registered voters/turnout	4,654,465	–		
Source: Nohlen et al.
