= Joyce Laboso =

Kenyan politician (1960–2019)

Governor of Bomet County
- In office 22 August 2017 – 29 July 2019
- Preceded by: Isaac Ruto

Deputy Speaker of the National Assembly of Kenya
- In office 28 March 2013 – 22 August 2017
- Preceded by: Farah Maalim
- Succeeded by: Moses Cheboi

Member of Parliament for Sotik
- In office 7 October 2008 – 22 August 2017
- Preceded by: Lorna Laboso
- Succeeded by: Dominic Koskei

Personal details
- Born: Joyce Cherono Laboso; 25 November 1960 Kericho District, Kenya Colony
- Died: 29 July 2019 (aged 58) Nairobi, Kenya
- Party: Jubilee
- Spouse: Edwin Abonyo (m. 1983)
- Children: 2
- Website: joycelaboso.com

Joyce Cherono Abonyo (née Laboso; 25 November 1960 – 29 July 2019) was a Kenyan politician who served as the second governor of Bomet County from 2017 until her death on 29 July 2019. She was a Member of Parliament representing Sotik constituency, before she was elected to the gubernatorial seat.

She was married to Dr. Edwin Abonyo, and had two sons. In 2008, she had to drop her husband's name and revert to Laboso because her marital status to a man from another community provided ammunition for her detractors to degrade her in her political journey.

== Political Life ==
Joyce Laboso was elected to the Parliament of Kenya to represent the Sotik Constituency in a by-election held on 25 September 2008. She succeeded her sister, Lorna Laboso, who died in a plane crash. A nominee of the Jubilee Party, she beat 11 other contestants after she garnered 23,880 with a vote margin of 10,000 over her closest challenger, retired Brigadier Alexander Sitienei (a former aide to Daniel arap Moi) who received 13,843 votes.

She was the ACP Co-president of the ACP–EU Joint Parliamentary Assembly.

She worked as a lecturer in the Department of Language and Linguistics at Egerton University and served as a Commissioner of the National Commission on Gender and Development.

Laboso was one of three first female governors in Kenya, along with Kitui County Governor Charity Ngilu and Kirinyaga County Governor Anne Waiguru. Laboso beat Isaac Rutto, the incumbent who had joined NASA Coalition. Rutto later conceded defeat in public.

== Personal life ==
Laboso attended Kaplong and Molo Primary Schools, before proceeding to Kaplong Girls Secondary School to pursue her O-Level. She later joined The Kenya High School where she sat for her A level.

Laboso was first diagnosed with cancer in 1991. According to her husband, Edwin, Laboso managed to survive cancer for 28 years. The disease struck her again severely in March 2019. The family sought medical attention both in the UK and India, unfortunately, the doctors informed them that nothing much could be done to save the governor's life. She later succumbed to cancer on 29 July 2019 at Nairobi Hospital. A requiem service for her was conducted on 2 August 2019 and her burial was held at her home in Fort Ternan, Kisumu County on 3 August 2019.
