= House of Representatives (Kenya) =

The House of Representatives was the lower house of the National Assembly of Kenya, under the Constitution of 1963, the upper house being the Senate

Elected between 18 and 26 May 1963, it consisted of 129 directly elected Members of Parliament, with its presiding officer being the Speaker, Sir Humphrey Slade.

The leader of the largest party, the Kenyan African National Union, Jomo Kenyatta, became the Prime Minister, appointed by the Governor-General.

Following constitutional amendments in 1964, Kenya was declared a republic with an executive President replacing the offices of Governor-General and Prime Minister.

In 1966, the House of Representatives was combined with the Senate, to form an enlarged single chamber parliament, known as the National Assembly.

== See also ==
- List of legislatures by country
- Politics of Kenya
