= Benjamin Langat =

Kenyan politician (born 1976)

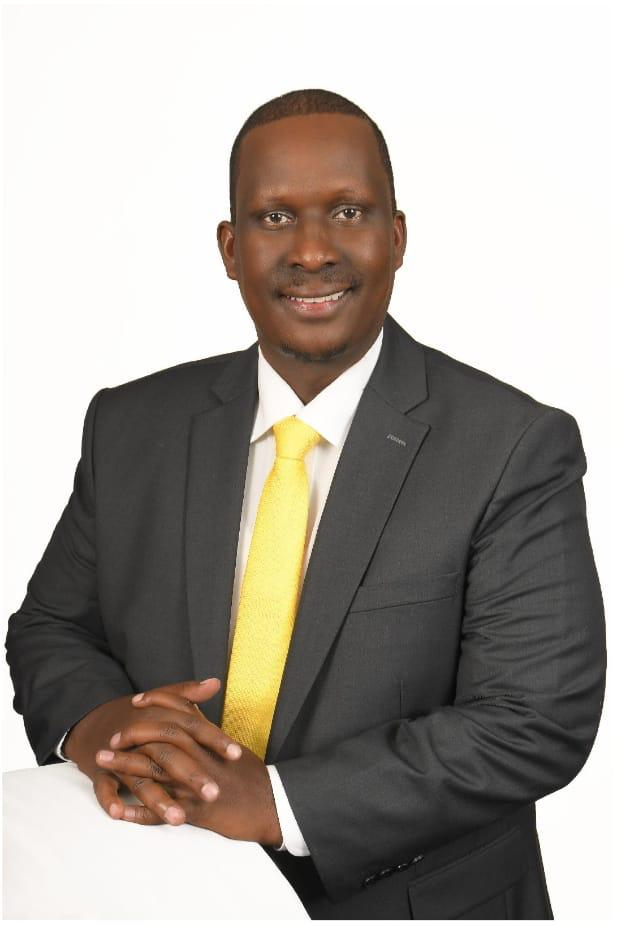

MP, Ainamoi Constituency
- Incumbent
- Assumed office 2022

Member of Parliament

Vice Chairperson of the Departmental Committee on Finance, Planning and Trade Parliament of Kenya
- In office 2022 – To date
- Constituency: Ainamoi (2022 to date)

Personal details
- Born: Benjamin Kipkirui Langat; 24 November 1976 (age 49) Chepkoiyo, Kericho, Kenya
- Education: Kericho High School
- Alma mater: University of Nairobi
- Awards: Chief of the Order of the Burning Spear (2015)
- Nickname: Benjaa

Hon. Amb. CPA Benjamin Kipkirui Langat, CBS is the current Member of Parliament for Ainamoi Constituency and immediate former Kenya High Commissioner to Namibia. He also served as the Member of Parliament for Ainamoi Constituency in Kericho from 2008 to 2017. He holds a Master of Business Administration Degree in Accounting and Bachelor of Commerce Degree (Accounting Option) both from the University of Nairobi. He is also a fully qualified Certified Public Accountant and member of the Institute of Certified Public Accountants of Kenya in good standing.

He was elected in the 2022 general election to Parliament under United Democratic Alliance.

== Early life ==
Hon. Benjamin Langat was born in Chepkoiyo Village, Ainamoi in the then Kericho District.

== Education ==
He attended Kericho High School for his O'Levels studies and proceeded to the University of Nairobi to pursue his undergraduate degree in Commerce. He furthered his studies to postgraduate level leading to a Master of Business Administration from the same university. Hon. Langat is also a fully Certified Public Accountant (CPA) and has his membership in good standing at the Institute of Certified Public Accountants. Langat is currently pursuing his PhD in Finance at the University of Nairobi.

== Professional and political career ==
He served as a Senior Accountant at Chai Trading Company Limited, a subsidiary of KTDA and also worked as an Internal Auditor at Consolidated Bank of Kenya Ltd before joining politics in the year 2008 and getting elected as a Member of Parliament representing Ainamoi Constituency for two consecutive terms. In 2015 he was awarded the Chief of the Order of the Burning Spear (CBS) award by the president of the Republic of Kenya Uhuru Kenyatta for his distinguished service to the nation. On 9 August 2022 he was re-elected to Parliament to represent the people of Ainamoi Constituency in the 13th Parliament.

== Legislation ==
In his last tenure in Parliament, he was actively involved as spokesman and chairman of the Departmental Committee on Finance, Planning and Trade, tasked with presenting the views of the committee on the floor of the House, including moving motions on different committee reports and Bills. He was also involved in reviewing the legislation on finance, industry, tourism, trade and planning. He successfully sponsored the following bills : Finance Bill 2013, 2014, 2015, 2016, 2017, The Value Added Tax Bill (2013), The Microfinance (Amendment) Bill (2013), The Insurance (Motor Vehicle Third Party Risks) (Amendment) Bill 2013, Tax Appeals Tribunal Bill (2013) Tax Procedures Bill (2013), The Kenya Deposit Insurance (Amendment) Bill 2013 and The Securities and Investment Analysts Bill (2014).

== Ambassadorial role ==
As the Head of Mission in Windhoek, he sought to promote, protect and project Kenyan-Namibian relations within the broad areas of economic, political, social, and environmental interests of the two countries.
