= Ainamoi Constituency =

Parliamentary Constituency in Kenya

Ainamoi
- Constituency
- Location within Kenya
- Coordinates: 0.2991951°S 35.2706625°E
- Country: Kenya
- County: Kericho County

Government
  - Member of parliament: Benjamin Langat

Ainamoi is an electoral constituency in Kenya. It is one of six constituencies of Kericho County. The constituency was established for the 1997 elections. Ainamoi has a population of 220,000 people. It is known for its tea plantations.

== Members of Parliament ==
| Elections | MP | Notes | |
|---|---|---|---|
| 1997 | Kipng'eno Arap Ng'eny | KANU | |
| 2002 | Noah Nondin Too | KANU | |
| 2007 | David Kimutai Too | ODM | Trop a été abattu en janvier 2008 |
| 2008 | Benjamin Langat | ODM | Par élection |
| 2013 | Benjamin Langat | URP | |
| 2017 | Sylvanus Maritim | Jubilee | |
| 2022 | Benjamin Langat | UDA | 13th Parliament of Kenya |

== Election results ==
=== 2017 General Election ===
General election 2017: Ainamoi
| Party | Candidate | Votes | % |
|---|---|---|---|
| Jubilee | Sylvanus Maritim | 32,987 | 56.7 |
| Independent | Benjamin Kipkirui Langat | 20,396 | 35.1 |
| ODM | Stellah Chepkurui | 4,224 | 7.3 |
| KANU | John Kibet Keino | 260 | 0.4 |
| Independent | Joseph Kibore Rotich | 260 | 0.4 |
| Majority | | 12,591 | 21.7 |

== Villages ==
Torit, Motosiet, Telanet, Kaboswa, Sitotwet, Kenegut, Ketitui, Ainamoi, Kipchimchim, Poiywek, Laliat, Merto, Keongo, Kaptebeswet, Chepkoiyo, Tendwet, Kapsaos, Chepngobob, Maso,Kapngetuny, Kericho Town, Kibchebor, Kapkugerwet, Kapcheptoror.

== Major centres ==
Kericho Town, Kapsoit, Ainamoi Centre, Kapkugerwet, Chebisom. |}

== Wards ==
- Kapsoit
- Ainamoi
- Kipchebor
- Kapkugerwet
- Kipchimchim
- Kapsaos

== See also ==
- Belgut Constituency
- Kipkelion West Constituency
- Kipkelion East Constituency
