= Kenya African Democratic Union =

Political party in Kenya

- Leader: Ronald Ngala
- Secretary-General: Masinde Muliro?
- Deputy Leader: Daniel arap Moi
- Founder: Ronald Ngala; Daniel arap Moi
- Founded: 1960
- Dissolved: 1964
- Merged into: KANU
- Ideology: Majimboism

Party flag

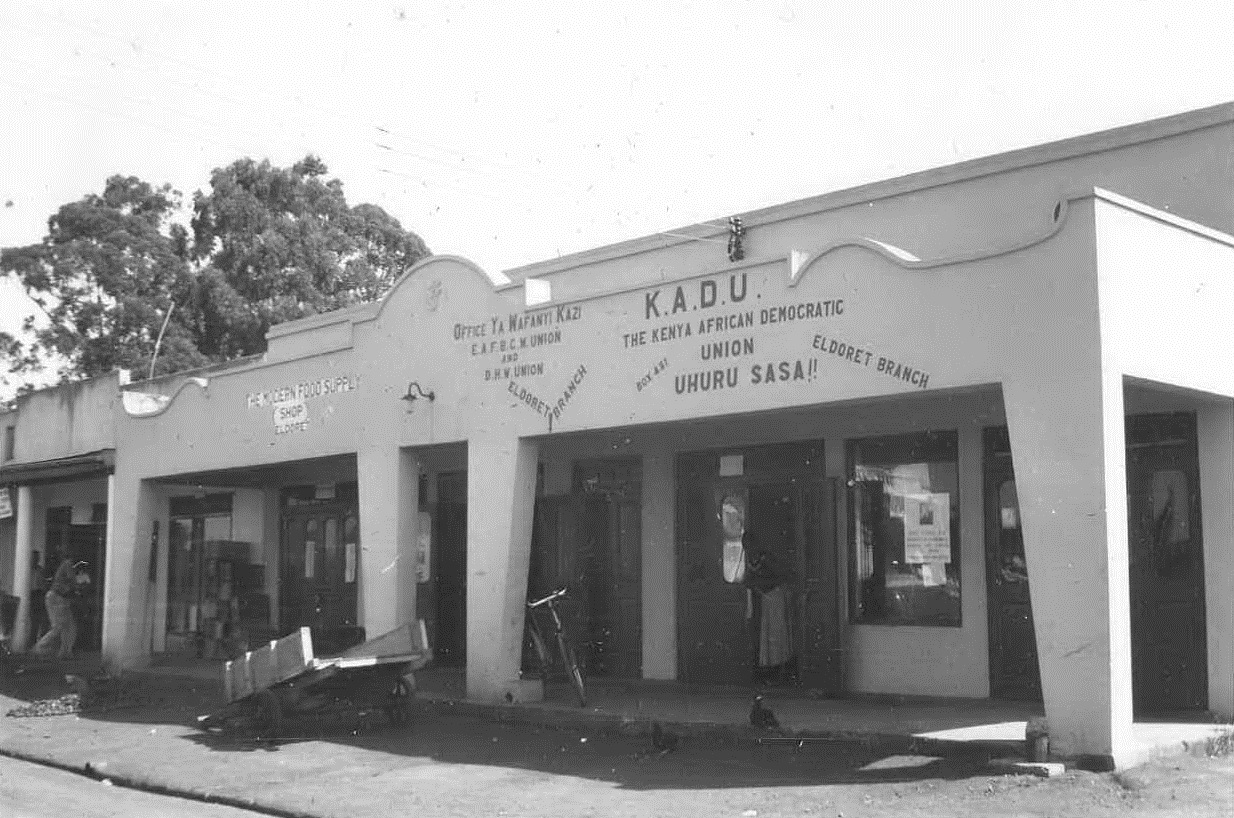
Eldoret Branch

The Kenya African Democratic Union (KADU) was a political party in Kenya. It was founded in 1960 when several leading politicians refused to join Jomo Kenyatta's Kenya African National Union (KANU). It was led by Ronald Ngala who was joined by Moi's Kalenjin Political Alliance, the Masai United Front, the Kenya African Peoples Party, the Coast African Political Union, Masinde Muliro's Baluhya Political Union and the Somali National Front. The separate tribal organisations were to retain their identity, and so KADU from its very start based its political approach on tribalism. KADU's aim was to defend the interests of the so-called KAMATUSA (an acronym for Kalenjin, Maasai, Turkana and Samburu ethnic groups) as well as the British settlers, against the imagined future dominance of the larger Luo and Kikuyu that comprised the majority of KANU's membership, when it became inevitable that Kenya would achieve its independence. KADU'S objective was to work towards multiracial self-government within the existing colonial political system. After the release of Jomo Kenyatta, KADU was becoming increasingly popular with European settlers and, on the whole, repudiated Kenyatta's leadership. KADU's plan at Lancaster meetings was devised by European supporters, essentially in order to protect existing British settlers' land rights.

== History ==
In 1952 Kenya African Union, KAU was banned and its leaders, the Kapenguria Six imprisoned by the colonial authorities. The colonial authorities could not conceive of any political opposition to their policies, nor could they accept the reality of African aspirations strongly advocated by Jomo Kenyatta, Dedan Kimathi and other African leaders However, Mau Mau insurgency, though defeated in 1956 led to changes in the way the colony was governed and a new constitution was inaugurated in 1954.Under the new constitution of 1954, it was believed that any solution to the African problems lay in the initiative of the colonial administration under European leadership, not in changing the political system as Africans had demanded under the banned KAU. To ensure no national African political movement arises to unite Africans and threaten colonial government, national political parties were banned in 1955. The colonial authorities instead promoted the idea of regional moderate tribal political parties all over the country other than in central Kenya where the political party ban remained until 1960.Regional moderate 'kingpins' subsequently emerged with their regional political parties. These included Daniel Moi, Masinde Muliro and Ronald Ngala. Majority of these regional leaders had been elected to the LegCo in 1957 general elections. Ronald Ngala brought all these regional outfits together to form KADU when Jomo Kenyatta was released from prison in 1961 and made the president of the newly formed KANU.

KADU lost to KANU in the first general elections in Kenya in 1963, where it had campaigned on a platform of Majimboism, multiracial nation with white minority rule under the principles established in the Lyttelton Constitution of 1954. KANU on the other hand had campaigned on total independence of Kenya under African majority rule with a new independence constitution. KADU delegation at Kenya's Lancaster house constitutional conference negotiated for and got federalism (Majimbo) adopted into Kenya's independence constitution. In the Lancaster House Conference attended by Kenyatta, KADU's plan was strongly supported, not just by the Europeans but also by the British government. In the end, KANU abandoned its own plan and accepted a British version of the KADU plan, providing for a bicameral legislature and for eight 'jimbos' with regional presidents.

== Dissolution ==
KADU dissolved in 1964 and merged with KANU under the great persuasive abilities of Tom Mboya upon the KADU leadership. Daniel arap Moi, who later served as President of Kenya, was KADU's chairman and attended the Lancaster House Conferences with Ronald Ngala. The KADU team also included Masinde Muliro who believed that the dominance of the two tribes needed to be neutralised so as to have a free and fairly led nation. The dissolution of KADU was orchestrated by the then justice and legal affairs minister Tom Mboya, first Secretary General and a founding member of KANU, who followed orders from the then President of Kenya, the late Mzee Jomo Kenyatta.
