= Kipkelion East Constituency =

Electoral constituency in Kenya

- constituency for the Parliament of Kenya

Current constituency
- Created: 2013
- Created from: Kipkelion Constituency

Kipkelion East is an electoral constituency in Kericho County, Kenya. It is one of six constituencies in the county. It was established for the 2013 general elections as constituency number 188 when Kipkelion Constituency was split into Kipkelion East and Kipkelion West constituency.

Kipkelion East incorporates Tendeno/Sorget, Londiani, Kedowa/Kimugul and Chepseon wards. The incumbent member of national assembly is Hon. Joseph Cherorot who succeeded Hon. Joseph Limo in 2022 General Election. Former MPs of the constituency include: Moses Kiprono of Soget, Kipsongol, Dr Richard Koech, Eng. Samuel Rotich, Dr Sammy Ruto and Bishop Tonui.

| Election | Member of Parliament | Party | Notes |
|---|---|---|---|
| 2013 | Joseph Limo | URP | elected |
| 2017 | Joseph Limo | Jubilee | elected |
| 2022 | Joseph Cherorot | United Democratic Alliance (UDA) | elected |

== Wards ==
The constituency is made up of four wards, each of which elects a representative (MCA) to the Kericho County Assembly.

| Wards | Population* |
|---|---|
| Londiani | 28,319 |
| Kedowa/Kimugul | 36,330 |
| Chepseon | 36,284 |
| Tendeno/Sorget | 10,899 |
| Total | 111,832 |
