= Kericho County =

- County
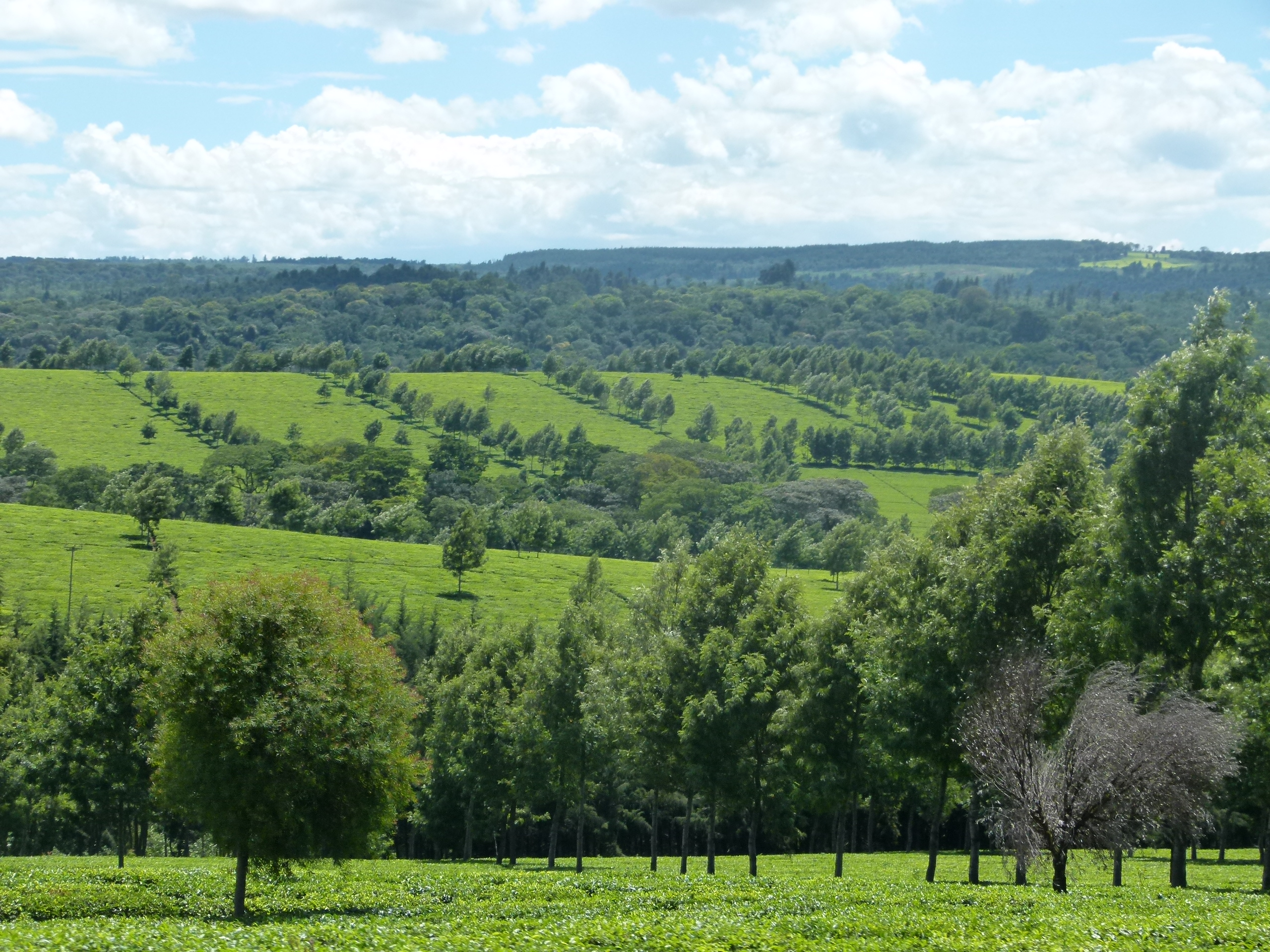

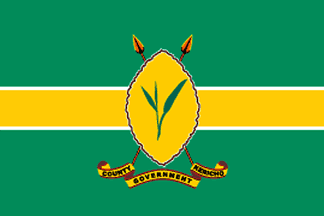
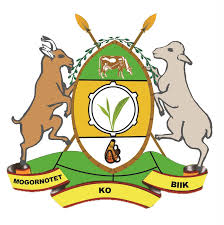
- Flag Coat of arms

- Location in Kenya
- Coordinates: 0.4°S 35.3°E
- Country: Kenya
- Formed: 4 March 2013
- Capital: Kericho

Government
  - Governor: Dr. Erick Mutai Equalizer

Area
  - Total: 2,454.5 km^{2} (947.7 sq mi)

Population (2019)
  - Total: 901,777
  - Density: 367.40/km^{2} (951.55/sq mi)
- Time zone: UTC+3 (EAT)
- Website: kericho.go.ke

Kericho County is one of the 47 counties in Kenya. The county seats between longitude 35°02' and 35°40' East and between the equator and latitude 0°23' South with an altitude of about 2002m above sea level. It borders Uasin Gishu County (Eldoret County) to the North, Baringo County to the North-East, Nandi County to the North-West, Nakuru County to the East and Bomet County to the South, Kisumu County to the Northwest and Nyamira County to the West. It had a population of 901,777 (2019 census) and an area of 2,111 km². Its capital and largest town is Kericho.

Kericho is the leading tea-producing region in the country, widely recognized as Kenya`s "tea capital" and ancestral heartland of the Kipsigis sub-tribe of the Kalenjin tribal group indigenous to the region. Situated in the highlands west of the Rift Valley, the county is home to some of the largest and most productive tea estates in Africa. It is also home to the popular Ketepa brand, one of the major local tea companies based in the region.

The defunct Buret District is now part of Kericho County.

== Physical and topical features ==
County slopes gently from 2500m to about 1,800m above the sea level. The county is surrounded by a number of hills such as Tinderet Hills to the North, Mau Escarpment and Londiani hills (Tuluap-Kipsigis). A good number of rivers emanate from the county including Chemosit, Kiptaret, Kipsonoi, Timbilil, Maramara, Itare, Nyando, Kipchorian and Malaget.

== Climatic conditions ==
County has a temperature range between 10C - 29C and rainfall of 2,125mm p.a being highest in central part of county where they plant tea and 1,400 mm p.a. in lower parts of Soin and parts of Kipkelion. County has rainy seasons April to June and October to December.

== Demographics ==
According to the 2019 Kenya Population and Housing Census, Kericho County had a total population of 901,777 of which 450,741 are males, 451,008 females and 28 intersex persons. There are 206,036 household with an average household size of 4.4 persons per household and a population density 370 people per square kilometre.

The total population of Kericho is estimated to have grown significantly. Official projections from the Kenya National Bureau of Statistics (KNBS) suggest that the county's population will reach approximately 1.2M by 2030-40, with a 2026 estimate of roughly one million people.

Distribution of Population by Sex and Sub-County
Sub-County	Male	Female	Intersex	Total
Belgut	72,508	72,564		145,072
Buret	98,823	100,642	5	199,470
Kericho East	86,671	83,947	7	170,625
Kipkelion	61,066	61,460	4	122,530
Londiani	68,570	69,000	10	137,580
Soin Sigowet	63,31036	63,395	2	126,500
Total	450,741	451,008	28	901,777

=== Religion ===
Religion in Kericho County

Religion (2019 Census)	Number
Catholicism	99,191
Protestant	396,003
Evangelical Churches	262,307
African instituted Churches	55,903
Orthodox	2,949
Other Christian	38,915
Islam	2,423
Hindu	461
Traditionists	1,358
Other	11,322
No ReligionAtheists	25,030
Don't Know	838
Not Stated	163

== Administrative and political units ==
=== Administrative units ===
There are six sub counties, thirty county assembly wards, eighty five locations and two hundred and nine sub-locations.

==== Electoral constituencies ====
The county has six constituencies:

- Ainamoi Constituency
- Belgut Constituency
- Bureti Constituency
- Kipkelion East Constituency
- Kipkelion West Constituency
- Sigowet–Soin Constituency

=== Political leadership ===
No	Portrait	Governor's Name	Elected	Term of Office	Political Party	Deputy Governor
1		Paul Chepkwony	2013-2022	10 years	TBA	Lily Kirui
2		Eric Mutai	2022-2026	Incumbent	UDA	Fred Kirui

Prof. Paul Kiprono Chepkwony was the Governor serving his last term in office after being elected twice 2013, 2017 and his deputy is Lily Kirui. Sen. Aaron Cheruiyot (Kiptoiyot) Aaron Cheruiyot is the Senator and was elected in 2015 after the first senator Charles Keter was appointed as the cabinet secretary for Ministry of Energy by President Uhuru Kenyatta. He was also re-elected in 2017. Florence Bore is the women representative and was elected in 2017 after winning against the Hellen Chelangat Chepkwony who was the first women representative for the county.

For Kericho County, the County Executive Committee comprises:-

County Executive Committee
	Number
The Governor	1
The Deputy Governor	1
The County Secretary	1
The CEC Members	10
Total	13

==== Members of Parliament in Kericho County 2017-2022 ====
1. Hon. Maritim, Sylvanus of Jubliee Party Member of Parliament Ainamoi Constituency.
2. Hon. Koech, Nelson of Jubliee PartyMember of Parliament Belgut Constituency.
3. Hon. Mutai, Japheth Kiplangat of Jubliee Party Member of Parliament Bureti Constituency.
4. Hon. Limo, Kirui Joseph of Jubliee Party Member of Parliament Kipkelion East Constituency.
5. Hon. Kosgei, Hilary Kiplang’at of Jubliee Party Member of Parliament Kipkelion West Constituency
6. Hon. Koros, Benard Kipsengeret of Jubliee Party Member of Parliament Sigowet–Soin Constituency.

== Economy ==
The county is part of the Lake Region Economic Bloc (LREB) established in 2018 to foster regional economic, industrial, social, and technological collaboration.

The county hosts 25 trading centres, 5,813 registered businesses, 5807 licensed retail traders and 5,740 licensed wholesale traders. In 2022, the county produced 432 million kilos of tea. The acquisition of these lands has long been controversial, particularly as it relates to the eviction of Kipsigis and Talai people from their land by British forces when Kenya was a British colony. The United Nations has criticised the British government for not providing "effective remedies and reparation" for colonial-era crimes, with representatives for these communities attempting to sue the British government through the European Court of Human Rights (ECHR).

There are a number of industries in Kericho such as cement industry (Rai Cement Limited) and steel industry (Prime Steel Limited), Soin Sugar Company all three of them located in Soin ward, 18 tea processing factories, in various sub-counties, dairy processing plants in various sub-counties and Kipkelion District coffee union process coffee in Fort Ternan, Kipkelion Sub-county. The use of tea plucking machines has been controversial in the area, leading to acts of industrial sabotage by disaffected youths.

== Education ==
There are 1,222 ECD centres, 1,059 primary schools, and 494 secondary schools. The county has also teachers training colleges, 43 Youth Polytechnics, 80 adult training institutions and 11 technical training institutions.

Education Institutions in County
Category	Public	Private	Total	Enrolment
ECD Centres	695	527	1,222	92,528
Primary schools	681	378	1,059	371,844
Secondary schools	451	43	494	89,184
Youth Polytechnics	34	9	43	12,619
Technical Training Institutes	6	5	11	9,511
Adult Education Centres	80			13,397

== Health ==
Kericho County has a total of 435 operational health facilities. This total includes public, private, and faith-based providers that have been integrated into the national Social Health Authority (SHA) framework for service delivery. The county has achieved an immunization coverage of 90% for essential vaccines like the third dose of the pentavalent vaccine. In July 2025, Kericho rolled out a massive 10-day integrated campaign targeting 95% coverage for measles, rubella, and typhoid to close the immunity gaps that widened during the COVID-19 pandemic.

Health Facilities by Ownership
	Government	*FBO	Private	NGO	TOTAL
Hospitals	7	2	5		14
Health centres	136	8	2	36	181
Dispensaries/Clinics	148	11	76	5	240

== Transport and communication ==
The county is covered by 1,110.7 km of road network. of this 411.1 km is covered by earth surface, 484.7 km is murram surface and 214.9 km is covered by bitumen.

There are 8 Post Offices with 2,299 installed letter boxes, 2,079 rented letter boxes and 220 vacant letter boxes.

== See also ==
- Baringo County
- Bomet County
- Bungoma County
- Kakamega County
- Kisii County
- Kisumu County
- Nakuru County
- Nandi County
- Uasin Gishu County
