= Kaloki Nyamai =

Kenyan artist

- Born: Kitui, Kenya
- Citizenship: Kenyan
- Education: Buruburu Institute of Fine Arts (Diploma in Interior Design)
- Occupations: Painter and sculptor
- Years active: 2009–present
- Title: Abstract artist

Kaloki Nyamai (born 1985 in Kitui, Kenya) is a multidisciplinary artist based in Nairobi, known for his immersive large scale installations. His practice explores Kenya's histories and collective memory, blending Akamba traditions with contemporary narratives. Working with materials such as sisal rope, stitched yarn, acrylic paint, and photo transfers, he examines themes of identity, resilience, and renewal. Nyamai often titles his works in Kikamba, embedding ancestral stories and pre-colonial imagery to create a dialogue between the past and the present.

== Early life and education ==
Nyamai was born in Kitui, Kenya, and grew up in a family that valued creativity and storytelling. His mother introduced him to drawing and painting at an early age, fostering his interest in art, while his grandmother, a traditional Kamba singer and storyteller, exposed him to oral traditions and cultural rituals that would later shape his artistic vision.

He pursued tertiary education at the Buruburu Institute of Fine Arts (BIFA) in Nairobi, where he studied Industrial design. After working briefly in design and other creative industries, Nyamai transitioned fully into fine art, finding in painting and installation a way to merge material experimentation with the exploration of Kenya's layered histories and collective memory. His interior design background has led him to design and create his cultural institutions in Nairobi, supporting emerging artists.

== Art and mentorship ==
His early works engaged with the lingering realities of collective memory and history. He uses layered materials (charcoal, rope, stitched yarn, burnt surfaces) to reflect on memory, identity and the histories of the Kamba people of Kenya. Through juxtaposition various contemporary issues, with his own life, Nyamai presents a far reaching understanding of contemporary identity and how much it is shaped by socio political factors.

He started out working between Kenya and the UK, and finally settled in Kenya fully in 2023 where he launched his first artist residency space called Kamene, named after his mother. Through cross cultural collaboration, Kamene continues nurture emerging and established talent in Nairobi and beyond.

He recently unveiled his new studio in Karen, naiorbi in collaboration with lead Architect David Adjaye of Adjaye Associates.

== Selected works ==
=== Kwambelelya na Kuminukilya (From Start to Finish)- 2024 ===
Commissioned by the Sharjah Art Biennale. The large, suspended installations draws on Akamba heritage and Kikamba-language titles to examine African history, ancestry, and social structures. Using layered materials and figurative motifs, Nyamai explores themes of memory, kinship, wealth, and political injustice, with stitched elements symbolizing healing and the continuity of collective memory.

=== Ila Nae Kana Taku (When i was a child like you (2022)) ===
Displayed at the Kenyan Pavilion, 59th Venice Biennale (2022). This series of paintings and mixed-media works explores memory, longing, and personal histories. Nyamai uses layered textures, stitched elements, and figurative motifs to evoke the interplay between individual experience and collective cultural narratives, reflecting on absence, nostalgia, and intergenerational memory.

=== Your Comfort Is My Discomfort (2020) ===
Exhibited at the Stellenbosch Triennale, this large, suspended installation used cow dung, sisal rope, and suspended boxes to interrogate postcolonial hierarchies, race, and economic power structures. The work emphasized materiality as a metaphor for historical weight and societal discomfort.

== Exhibitions ==
- 2026: Sprengel Museum, Hanover, Germany
- 2025: Sharjah Bienale, Sharjah, UAE
- 2025: Ithokoo masuiluni, Norval Foundation, South Africa
- 2024: The True Size of Africa: Transcontinental Perspectives, Völklinger Hütte, Germany
- 2024: Twe Vaa, James Cohan, New York City
- 2023: Dining in Chaos, Barbara Thumm, Berlin
- 2022: Kenyan Pavilion, 59th Venice Biennale, Venice, Italy
- 2020: Stellenbosch Triennale, South Africa.
- 2019:Ostrale Bienale, Dresden, Germany

== See also ==
- Wangechi Mutu
- Ingrid Mwangi
- Kawira Mwirichia
- Beatrice Wanjiku
