= Edith Vethi Nyenze =

Kenyan politician

Member of Parliament of the Kenyan Parliament for Kitui West
- Incumbent
- Assumed office 26 March 2018
- Preceded by: Francis Nyenze

Personal details
- Born: 13 December 1960 (age 65) Kitui County
- Party: WDM-K
- Spouse: Francis Nyenze
- Children: 1 son & 2 daughters

Edith Vethi Nyenze is a Kamba Kenyan politician who is the incumbent Member of Parliament for Kitui West Constituency. She was elected to succeed her late husband Francis Nyenze as the 7th Member of Parliament for Kitui West Constituency. She belongs to the WDM.

== Kitui West By-election ==
Following the death of her husband in December 2017, Edith declared her intention to plunk into electoral politics. She entered in the race to succeed him as Member of Parliament for Kitui West Constituency in the subsequent by-election on 26 March 2018; and participated in the WDM party primary election process, emerging the winner. She beat Maluki Mwendwa, son to Winnie Nyiva Mwendwa.

On 26 March 2018 she won the seat on a landslide victory, garnering 72% of the total votes cast. The by-election voter turnout was said to be 38%.
