= Maunaloa, Hawaii =

Maunaloa
- Census-designated place
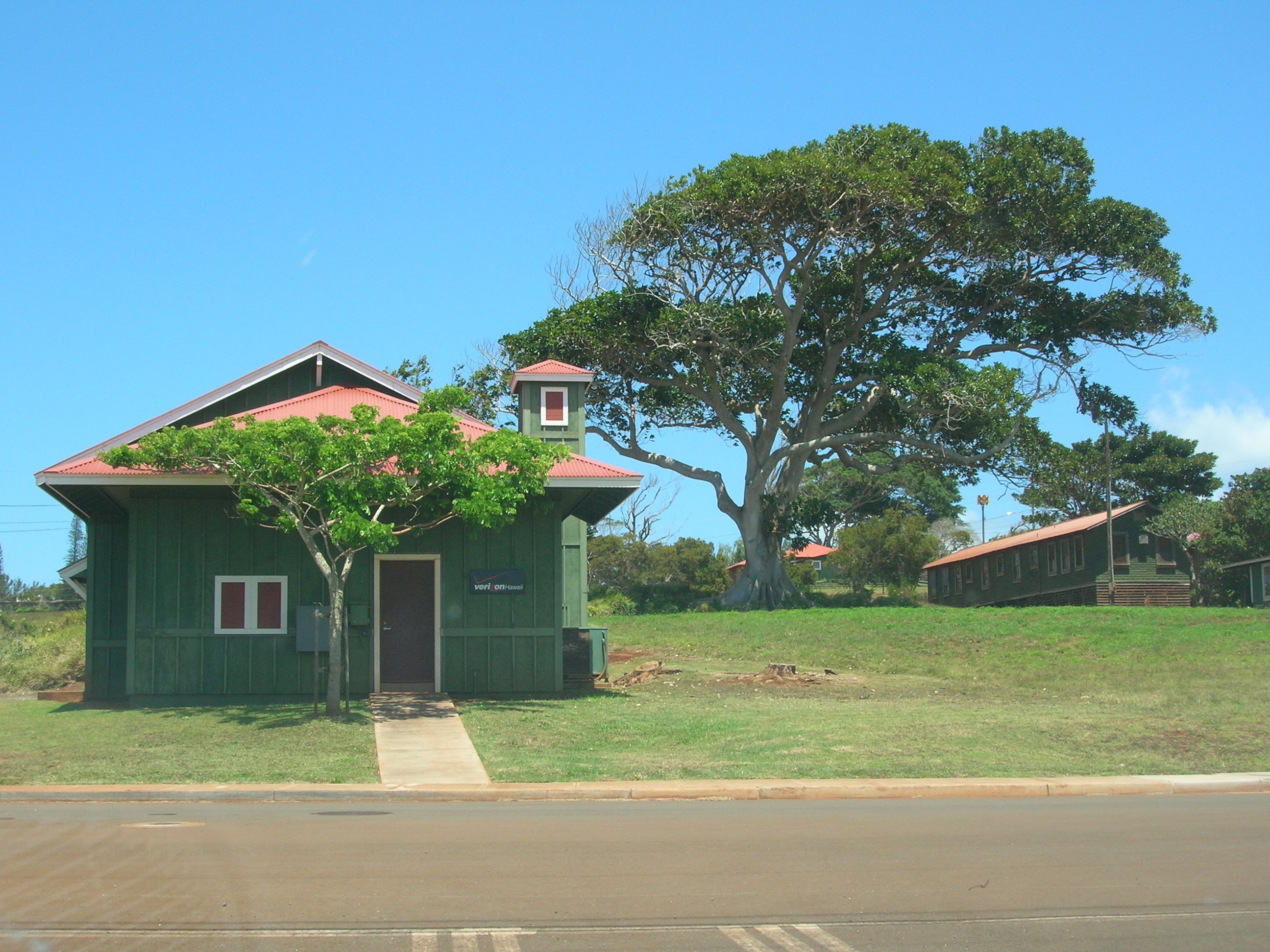
- A populated area in Maunaloa

- Location in Maui County and the state of Hawaii
- Coordinates: 21°8′11″N 157°12′51″W
- Country: United States
- State: Hawaii
- County: Maui

Area
  - Total: 0.74 sq mi (1.91 km^{2})
  - Land: 0.74 sq mi (1.91 km^{2})
  - Water: 0 sq mi (0.00 km^{2})
- Elevation: 889 ft (271 m)

Population (2020)
  - Total: 435
  - Density: 590.9/sq mi (228.13/km^{2})
- Time zone: UTC-10 (Hawaii-Aleutian)
- ZIP code: 96770
- Area code: 808
- FIPS code: 15-50150
- GNIS feature ID: 0362274

Maunaloa (Hawaiian pronunciation: [mɐwnəˈlowə]) or Mauna Loa is a census-designated place (CDP) in Maui County, Hawaiʻi, United States, in the western part of the island of Molokai. The population was 435 at the 2020 census.

== Geography ==
Maunaloa is located at 21°8′11″N 157°12′51″W (21.136464, −157.214029).

It lies at 889 feet (271 m) above sea level. According to the United States Census Bureau, the CDP has a total area of 0.73 square miles (1.9 km^{2}), all of it land.

== Demographics ==
Historical population
Census	Pop.	Note	%±
2020	435		—
U.S. Decennial Census

As of the census of 2000, there were 230 people, 65 households, and 52 families residing in the CDP. The population density was 1,374.6 inhabitants per square mile (530.7/km^{2}). There were 91 housing units, at an average density of 543.9 per square mile (210.0/km^{2}). The racial makeup of the CDP was 15.7% White, 0.3% African American, 18.7% Asian, 34.4% Pacific Islander, and 30.9% from two or more races. Hispanic or Latino of any race were 5.2% of the population.

There were 65 households, out of which 50.8% had children under the age of 18 living with them, 56.9% were married couples living together, 18.5% had a female householder with no husband present, and 18.5% were non-families. 13.8% of all households were made up of individuals, and 1.5% had someone living alone who was 65 years of age or older. The average household size was 3.54 and the average family size was 3.96.

In the CDP the population was spread out, with 43.5% under the age of 18, 8.3% from 18 to 24, 25.2% from 25 to 44, 14.3% from 45 to 64, and 8.7% who were 65 years of age or older. The median age was 22 years. For every 100 females, there were 109.1 males. For every 100 females age 18 and over, there were 94.0 males.

The median income for a household in the CDP was $22,232, and the median income for a family was $21,786. Males had a median income of $23,333 versus $20,625 for females. The per capita income for the CDP was $8,065. About 19.2% of families and 22.3% of the population were below the poverty line, including 29.7% of those under the age of eighteen and none of those 65 or over.

== Economy ==
The major employer in town until recently was Molokai Ranch, which owns about one third of the island's land. Molokai Ranch previously operated a small 22-room hotel, gas station, golf club and cattle-rearing business centered on the town. In April 2008 the company closed all of these businesses, stating that operations could not continue due to opposition from the community regarding its development plans for the island. (See: Ke `Aupuni Lokahi)
