= Urbanus (disambiguation) =

Urbanus is a Belgian comedian, actor, and singer.

Urbanus may also refer to:

- Urbanus (album), by Stefon Harris
- Urbanus (butterfly), a genus of skippers
- Urbanus (comic strip), a comic strip by Urbanus

== People ==
- Pope Urban (Latin: Urbanus)
- Urbanus (usurper), 3rd-century Roman usurper
- Urbanus Rhegius, Protestant Reformer
- Urbanus Joseph Kioko, Kenyan bishop
- Han Urbanus, Dutch baseball player

== See also ==
- Urban (disambiguation)
