= Nimrod Mbai =

Kenyan politician (born 1978)

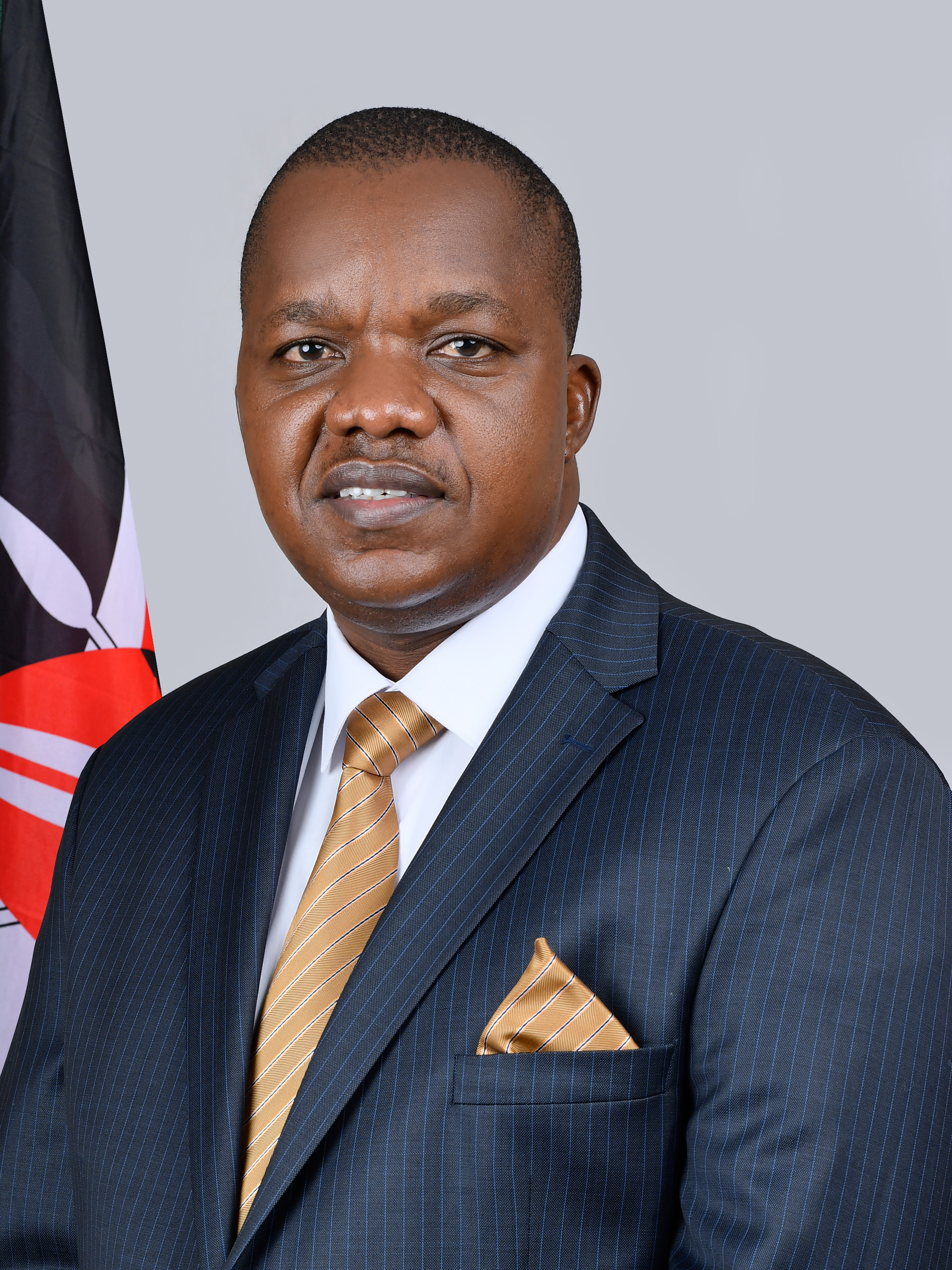

Member of Parliament for Kitui East
- Incumbent
- Assumed office 31 August 2017
- President: Uhuru Kenyatta
- Preceded by: Major (Rtd) Mutua Muluvi

Personal details
- Born: 22 December 1978 (age 47) Kitui, Kenya
- Party: UDA

Nimrod Mbithuka Mbai (born 22 December 1978) is a Kenyan politician and the current Member of Parliament for Kitui East Constituency. He was elected on a UDA ticket in the August 8th elections. He won after garnering a total of 14, 256 votes against 10, 899 votes garnered by NARC's Militonic Mwendwa Kitute. The then incumbent Member of Parliament, Major (Rtd) Mutua Muluvi was fourth with 5, 436 votes. He is an ex-police officer and served as security aide to the late Francis Nyenze and later to the former Machakos County Governor Alfred Mutua. Governor Mutua appointed him to his government in 2013 after Mbai resigned from his police service. Mbai caused controversy for his rape remarks against Kitui Governor Charity Ngilu because of the governor's support for poll boycott called by former Prime Minister Raila Odinga. He later apologised following public outcry and pressure from women's rights group FIDA Kenya
