= Mutua =

Mutua may refer to:

- Mutua Madrid Open, a tennis tournament played on indoor hard courts since 2002, sponsored by Mutua Madrileña
- Mutua Madrileña, non-profit Spanish insurance company founded in 1930
- Mutua (surname)
