= Nzamba Kitonga =

Kenyan lawyer and politician (1956–2020)

Philip Nzamba Kitonga (1956 – 24 October 2020) was a Kenyan lawyer and politician.

== Career ==
He held many positions in his career but he was best known for being on the Committee of Experts on Constitutional Review (CoE) that drafted the new Constitution of Kenya.

He was born in Kitui County, and held positions such as president of the East Africa Law Society and COMESA Court of Justice.

He was one of the gubernatorial candidates in 2013 Kitui local elections but lost to Julius Malombe. He was one of the shortlisted candidates for the position of Chief Justice of Kenya to replace Willy Mutunga.

Kitonga while attending a funeral in Mutito, Kitui, collapsed, and died on 24 October 2020 at the age of 64.
