= Empowerment zone =

Within United States federal legislation, an empowerment zone is an economically distressed community eligible to receive tax incentives and grants from the United States federal government under the Empowerment Zones and Enterprise Communities Act of 1993. Economic Empowerment zones are designed to encourage business development and eventually, investment activity, with favorable tax laws, grants, subsidies, job programs, less stringent regulations, and other economic incentives.

== History ==
Congress has used Enterprise Zones as programs to help both rural and urban communities. Historically, such zones had bipartisan political support. Both Democrats and Republicans found using government incentives and deregulation to foster community economic development to be appealing.

Federal and state Enterprise Zone Programs originated in the 1980s during the Reagan administration and persisted through their name change to Empowerment Zones during the early years (1993 to 1994) of the Clinton administration.

== Program ==
The Empowerment Zone Program consists of three US congressional designations. The Renewal Communities (RCs), Empowerment Zones (EZs) and Enterprise Communities (ECs) are highly distressed urban and rural communities that may be eligible for a combination of grants, tax credits for businesses, bonding authority and other benefits. Highly distressed refers to communities who have experienced poverty and/or high emigration based upon definitions in the law. These designations, RCs, EZs and ECs were awarded in three competitions since 1994. The program was the legislative response to riots that erupted in 1992 in Los Angeles and then throughout the United States after police officers charged in the beating of an African-American motorist during an arrest.

At the end of the Clinton administration, the Community Renewal Tax Relief Act of 2000 authorized the creation of 40 renewal communities and created the New Markets Tax Credit Program. The program ended on December 31, 2011.

On February 1, 2013, the Joint Committee on Taxation extended the program for another two years to December 31, 2013. The Protecting Americans from Tax Hikes Act, signed into law on December 18, 2015, later extended the program through the end of 2016.

This program is primarily managed through partnerships between the local entity and either the Department of Housing and Urban Development (HUD) for RCs and urban areas or the US Department of Agriculture (USDA) for rural EZs and ECs. There are or were 40 HUD RCs, 28 of which are in urban areas and 12 in rural communities. There are or were 30 HUD EZs, all of which in urban areas. There are or were 10 USDA EZs and 20 USDA ECs in rural communities. A couple RCs had as few as 100 businesses, while several RCs and EZs had more than 5,000 businesses. No RC, EZ or EC has or had a population greater than 200,000.

== Tax incentives and bonds ==
=== Empowerment Zones (EZs) ===
Qualifying businesses in EZs are eligible for employment credits (up to $3,000 yearly per Enterprise Zone resident employed). Qualifying EZ businesses are also eligible for low-cost loans through EZ facility bonds, increased Section 179 tax deductions, partial-exclusion of tax on capital gains upon the sale of certain assets, and other incentives.

The EZ employment credit provides businesses with an incentive to hire individuals who both live and work in an empowerment zone. (An exception applies to the Washington, DC empowerment zone. Individuals who work in the Washington, DC empowerment zone may live anywhere in the District of Columbia.) The credit can be claimed if the individuals pay or incur “qualified zone wages” to a “qualified zone employee”. The credit is 20% of the qualified zone wages paid or incurred during a calendar year. The amount of qualified zone wages used to figure the credit cannot be more than $15,000 for each employee for each calendar year. As a result, the credit can be as much as $3,000 (20% of $15,000) per qualified zone employee each year.

Although the Empowerment Zone wage tax credit program expired on December 31, 2011, credits could still be claimed by amending tax returns for the years 2009, 2010, and 2011

=== Renewal Communities (RCs) ===
Qualifying businesses in RCs are eligible for employment credits (up to $1,500 yearly per RC resident employed). Qualifying RC businesses are also eligible for a 0% tax on the capital gains of assets sold, provided the business holds the asset at least five years. Businesses in RCs that build or substantially rehabilitate commercial property may also be eligible for up to $10 million in Commercial Revitalization Deductions to rapidly increase their depreciation schedules.

The Renewal Community program expired on December 31, 2009, but a company can still amend its tax return for 2009 to claim the available credits.

=== Enterprise Communities (ECs) ===
ECs were located in rural areas. All 20 EC programs were administered by the US Department of Agriculture (USDA) and the local EC entity. (In rural communities, there are or were 12 HUD RCs and 10 USDA EZs.)

Parts of the following urban areas are or were Empowerment Zones:

Pulaski County, Arkansas	Tucson, Arizona	Fresno, California	Los Angeles, California	Santa Ana, California	New Haven, Connecticut	Jacksonville, Florida	Miami/Dade County, Florida	Chicago, Illinois
Gary/Hammond/East Chicago, Indiana	Boston, Massachusetts	Baltimore, Maryland	Detroit, Michigan	Minneapolis, Minnesota	St. Louis, Missouri/East St. Louis, Illinois	Cumberland County, New Jersey	New York, New York	Syracuse, New York
Yonkers, New York	Cincinnati, Ohio	Cleveland, Ohio	Columbus, Ohio	Oklahoma City, Oklahoma	Philadelphia, Pennsylvania/Camden, New Jersey	Columbia/Sumter, South Carolina	Knoxville, Tennessee	El Paso, Texas
San Antonio, Texas	Norfolk/Portsmouth, Virginia	Huntington, WV/Ironton, Ohio						

Parts of the following rural areas are or were empowerment zones:

Desert Communities, California (part of Riverside County)	Southwest Georgia United, Georgia (part of Crisp County and all of Dooly County)
Southernmost Illinois Delta, Illinois (parts of Alexander and Johnson Counties and all of Pulaski County)	Kentucky Highlands, Kentucky (part of Wayne County and all of Clinton and Jackson Counties)
Aroostook County, ME (part of Aroostook County)	Mid-Delta, MS (parts of Bolivar, Holmes, Humphreys, Leflore, Sunflower, and Washington Counties)
Griggs-Steele, North Dakota part of Griggs County and all Steele County	Oglala Sioux Tribe, South Dakota (part of Jackson County and all of Bennett and Shannon Counties)
Middle Rio Grande FUTURO Communities, Texas (parts of Dimmit, Maverick, Uvalde, and Zavala Counties)	Rio Grande Valley, Texas (parts of Cameron, Hidalgo, Starr, and Willacy Counties)

== See also ==
- Ke `Aupuni Lokahi - A former Empowerment Zone and Enterprise Community in Molokai, Hawaii.
- Renewal community - Term applied to RCs and EZs colletively
- New Markets Tax Credit Program
- Community Renewal Tax Relief Act of 2000

== Sources ==
- US Department of Housing and Urban Development, Questions and Answers on Renewal Community (RC) and Empowerment Zone (EZ) tax incentives
- US Internal Revenue Service; TAX INCENTIVES FOR DISTRESSED COMMUNITIES, IRS Publication 954
