= Leo (2012 film) =

2012 Kenyan film

- Directed by: Jinna Mutune
- Release date: 2012
- Country: Kenya
- Language: English

Leo is a 2012 Kenyan movie directed by Jinna Mutune.

== Synopsis ==
A young Masai boy is eager to become a super hero despite the challenges he faces in life.
