= Kiema Kilonzo =

Kenyan politician and diplomat

- Born: 13 April 1966 (age 60); Kenya
- Citizenship: Kenya
- Education: University of Nairobi (BA in Political Science) (MA in Armed Conflict and Peace Studies)
- Occupations: Politician & Diplomat
- Years active: 1987 – present
- Title: Ambassador to Turkey

Ambassador Julius Kiema Kilonzo (born 13 April 1966), is a Kenyan politician and diplomat, who serves as Ambassador to Uganda, since September 2018.

Before that, from August 2014 until September 2018, he served as Kenya's ambassador to Turkey. Before his current assignment, he served two terms in the Kenya parliament presenting present-day Kitui East Constituency (at that time "Mutito Constituency"), from 2002 until 2012.

== Background and education ==
Kilonzo was born on 13 April 1966 in present-day Kitui County, just outside the town of Kitui. He belongs the Oini (Mbaa Ndune) clan. He studied at the University of Nairobi (UoN), graduating with a Bachelor of Arts degree in Political Science. Later, he obtained a Master of Arts degree in Armed Conflict and Peace Studies, also from UoN.

== Early career ==
After his studies Kilonzo joined a company called Toplic and Handling Limited' as an investigator-trainee. Over time, he was promoted to the position of investigations manager, responsible for investigations, tracing and fraud. Later, he was hired by Madison Insurance Company Limited in the same capacity. He then left to join Crystal Clear Loss Adjusters Limited, as the assistant general manager. Then he was promoted to the rank of managing director. Later, he worked as the chief executive officer of the Dynasty Group of Companies.

== Political career ==
He was first elected on a Forum for the Restoration of Democracy-People (Ford-People) ticket in 2002 before being re-elected on a Wiper Democratic Movement-Kenya (WDM-K) ticket in 2007. He was a gubernatorial candidate in 2013 Kitui local elections but came second behind Julius Malombe. He was vying on a National Rainbow Coalition (NARC) ticket.

== Diplomatic career ==
In 2014, he was appointed by President Uhuru Kenyatta as the first Kenyan ambassador to Turkey following the opening of the Kenyan Embassy in Ankara in 2012. He presented his credentials to the then president of Turkey, Recep Tayyip Erdoğan, in July 2015.

In 2018, he was appointed by President Uhuru Kenyatta as the Kenyan ambassador to Uganda. He presented his credentials to President Yoweri Kaguta Museveni in September 2018.
