= Chief Kivoi Mwendwa =

Kamba trader and guide

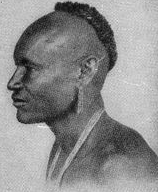
- Chief Kivoi Mwendwa, 1849
- Born: 1780s Kitui, Kenya
- Died: 19 August 1852; Tana River
- Occupation: Trader

Chief Kivoi Mwendwa (born in the 1700s) was a Kamba long-distance trader who lived in the present day Kitui. Kivoi is most famous for guiding missionaries into the interior of the present day Kenya after he guided the German missionaries Johann Ludwig Krapf and Johannes Rebmann of the Anglican Church Missionary Society (CMS). During the trips, both Rebmann and Krapf came within visual distance of Mount Kenya.

== Overview ==
Kivoi met the two Europeans in Mombasa and traveled with them to Ukambani where, on 3 December 1849, they became the first white people to see Mount Kenya.

Back in Europe, their reports of snow on the equatorial mountain were met with disbelief and ridicule for many years.

Chief Kivoi interacted with Arabs in the coast and Voi town was named for him because that was one of his stop overs towns where caravans settled before entered into the coastal town of Mombasa. According locals of Voi Town, Kivoi settled along Voi River in the mid-1800s.

His actual birth date is unknown as it is not recorded but he is believed to have lived from the 1780s to 19 August 1852. His descendants are not known in historical context but he was extensively mentioned by Ludwig Krapf in his Mission to Africa.

== Death ==
According to Ludwig Krapf, Kivoi and his immediate followers were killed after their caravan was attacked by robbers in the second expedition in Tana River 2 miles from Yatta.

In a diary entry Krapf says, "This expedition proved most calamitous, and, as already mentioned, Krapf's 'escape with life was a marvel'."

"When within a mile or two of the Dana, the party was suddenly attacked by robbers. The greater part of the caravan was instantly dispersed, Kivoi's people flying in all directions; Kivoi himself was killed with his immediate followers; Krapf fired his gun twice, but into the air, 'for', said he, 'I could not bring myself to shed the blood of man'; and then he found himself in the bash, separated from both friend and foe, and flying in what he supposed to be the best direction."

After the death of Chief Kivoi, Krapf was accused of causing his death and the Akamba condemned him to die. At midnight he managed to escape, and fled in the direction of Yatta. His perils were now greater than before, as he was in an inhabited country, and feared to travel by day lest he should be detected and murdered, while at night he frequently missed his way, and in the dense darkness of the forests his compass was of little use.
