= Theresia Kyalo =

Kenyan lawyer, jewellery designer and businesswoman

- Born: 1996 (age 29–30); Kenya
- Citizenship: Kenya
- Education: Greenfield International School (High School Diploma); Riara University (Bachelor of Laws)
- Occupations: Lawyer, businesswoman, jeweler
- Years active: 2016–present

Theresia Kyalo, is a Kenyan lawyer, businesswoman, jewellery designer and multidisciplinary artist, who was signed by Beyoncé Knowles on the pop artist's directory of Black Owned Businesses in July 2020.

== Background and education ==
She was born in Kenya circa 1996. She attended Greenfield Community School, in Dubai, United Arab Emirates, where she graduated with a High School Diploma. She then returned to Kenya and enrolled at Riara University in Nairobi, graduating with a Bachelor of Laws degree in 2020.

== Career ==
Theresia studied law but her work in entirely in art and jewellery. She works with diverse media and mediums, including textile, paper, film, brass and metal. She often collaborates with other artists in her work. She exhibits her work in physical shows and in digital forums in video and photograph format.

She started experimenting with art in 2016, while still in law school. Beginning with line drawings, she progressed to other forms of art and mediums. Her work spans textile, metal, paper and film. Her art is self-taught. Recent collaborations have included with established brands, Adele Dejak and Love Studio. In 2019, she exhibited in 7 Days in November event, where she also ran workshops.

Her jewellery design pieces are intended to be worn by both women and men. She works with many metals, but mainly with brass, thus ensuring affordability of her work to the general public.

== See also ==
- Kathryne Maundu
