= 2013 Kitui local elections =

Local elections in Kenya

Kitui Gubernatorial Elections were held in Kitui to elect a Governor and County Assembly on 4 March 2013. Under the new constitution, which was passed in a 2010 referendum, the 2013 general elections were the first in which Governors and members of the County Assemblies for the newly created counties were elected. They will also be the first general elections run by the Independent Electoral and Boundaries Commission(IEBC) which has released the official list of candidates.

== Gubernatorial election ==
| Candidate | Running Mate | Coalition | Party | Votes |
|---|---|---|---|---|
| Kilonzo, Julius Kiema | Mulwa, Kennedy Ngumbau | | National Rainbow Coalition | 85,723 |
| Kitonga, Philip Nzamba | Mwongela, Benjamin Nymai | | National Labour Party | 24,574 |
| Malombe, Julius Makau | Malonza, Peninah | | Wiper Democratic Movement – Kenya | 163,904 |

== Prospective candidates ==
The following are some of the candidates who have made public their intentions to run:

- Charity Ngilu - Former Lands Cabinet Secretary
- David Musila - Senator Kitui County
- Julius Makau Malombe - former chairman of the devolved government taskforce and a nephew to former Cabinet minister Nyiva Mwendwa,
