= Eric Mutua =

Kenyan lawyer and politician

Eric Kyalo Mutua (born 1970) is a Kenyan lawyer and politician. He has served as the chairman of the Law Society of Kenya and as the treasurer of the East Africa Law Society He unsuccessfully contested for Mwingi Central constituency Wiper Democratic Movement-Kenya (WDM-K) nominations where he lost to Gideon Mulyungi, the incumbent Member of Parliament.
