= Patricia Ithau =

Kenyan businesswoman and corporate executive

- Born: c. 1966 (age 59–60); Kenya
- Education: Loreto Convent Msongari; University of Nairobi; United States International University Africa; Strathmore University; IESE Business School; INSEAD; Saïd Business School
- Occupation: Business executive
- Years active: 1999 to present
- Title: Chief Executive Officer at WPP-Scangroup (2022 - 2025)
- Spouse: Leonard Ithau

Patricia Ithau, is a Kenyan business executive. She served as the executive director and chief executive officer of WPP-Scangroup, a multimedia, information technology and advertising conglomerate whose company shares are publicly listed on the Nairobi Securities Exchange, from 2022 to 2025. Before that, she worked as the regional director for East Africa at Stanford Seed, an initiative of the Stanford University Graduate School of Business that aims to reduce global poverty.

== Background and education ==
She is Kenyan by birth, c. 1966. She attended Loreto Convent Msongari school for her secondary education. She holds a Bachelor of Commerce degree from the University of Nairobi. Her degree of Master of Business Administration was awarded by United States International University Africa, in Nairobi. She has over the years received advanced management training from Strathmore University, IESE Business School, INSEAD and Saïd Business School of the University of Oxford in the United Kingdom.

== Work experience ==
At the time she was appointed CEO of WPP-Scangroup, her varied business experience went back for over a quarter of a century. She has served in leadership positions in companies that manufacture fast-moving consumer goods and cosmetics for distribution on the African continent. She has worked as the managing director/CEO at Uganda Breweries, based in Kampala Uganda, East African Breweries, based in Nairobi, Kenya and Unilever East Africa, based in Nairobi. She was the founding CEO at the African subsidiary at the time the parent company established L'Oréal Africa, based in Johannesburg, South Africa.

== Other leadership roles ==
She holds board positions at nearly a dozen companies and organizations, including Absa Bank Kenya, British Chamber of Commerce and Industry, Jambojet, TradeMark East Africa, Kenya Private Sector Alliance, Vivo Activewear and WPP- Scangroup. She is also a Trustee on the boards of trustees of M-Pesa Foundation and Vodafone Foundation, United Kingdom.

== Family ==
She is a married to Leonard Ithau and is the mother of two daughters.

== See also ==
- Catherine Igathe
- Sauda Rajab
- Nelly Tuikong
