= Nzomo Mutuku =

Kenyan Economist (born 1969)

- Born: 17 May 1969 (age 57)
- Died: 4 July 2022; London
- Citizenship: Kenya
- Education: University of Nairobi; Bachelor of Arts, Master of Arts; Tufts University; Certificate in Digital Money; University of Cambridge; Certificate in Africa Climate Finance
- Occupation: Economist
- Years active: 1994-2022
- Known for: Economics
- Title: Chief Executive, RBA

Nzomo Mutuku is a former Kenyan C-Suite executive at the Retirement Benefits Authority of Kenya. He served the organization as the chief executive officer from March 2017 to the end of his tenure in June 2022. He was also an ex-officio member of the board of directors. He died in London days after his retirement.

== Career ==
Nzomo worked as an Economist at the Central Bank of Kenya for six years from the year 1994 before moving to RBA in 2000 as Chief Manager, Research and Development. After 13 years, he was seconded to the National Treasury & Planning as a senior adviser, the Financial sector in Jun 2013, and was acting Director in the Financial and Sectoral Affairs Department until Mar of the year 2017.

He returned to RBA in Apr 2017 as acting chief executive officer for 14 months before taking over fully until his retirement in Jun 2022. In September 2019 he was called upon to serve as the Interim chair of the African Pension Supervisors Forum.

== Education ==
Nzomo held a Bachelor of Arts and Master of Arts degree in economics from the University of Nairobi. He earned a Certificate in Digital Money from the Fletcher School of Tufts University, and another certificate on Africa Climate Finance Leadership Programme from the University of Cambridge Institute for Sustainability Leadership. He was a Fellow of the Economist Society of Kenya.
