= Mutua (surname) =

Mutua is a Kenyan surname that may refer to the following people:

- Alfred Mutua (born 1970), Kenyan Government Spokesperson
- Ben Mutua Jonathan Muriithi (born 1969), Kenyan writer and actor based in the United States
- David Mutinda Mutua (born 1992), Kenyan middle-distance runner
- Joseph Mutua (born 1978), Kenyan middle-distance runner
- Kasiva Mutua, Kenyan drummer
- Makau W. Mutua (born 1958), Kenyan-American professor of law
