= Renewal community =

Renewal Communities (RCs) and Empowerment Zones (EZs) are distressed urban and rural communities in the United States where qualifying businesses are eligible for billions of dollars in tax incentives. They were created in the Community Renewal Tax Relief Act of 2000, which was eventually passed as part of the Consolidated Appropriations Act, 2001.

The Community Renewal Tax Relief Act of 2000 is intended to improve development in economically distressed areas of the United States. The law offers "tax incentives for businesses to locate and hire residents in urban and rural areas that have not experienced recent economic expansion." Both rural and urban areas are eligible. Three primary means were used: renewal communities, empowerment zones, and community development entities. The bill also created the New Markets Tax Credit Program, which has been renewed several times and is still in effect.

One provision of the Community Renewal Tax Relief Act of 2000 was the creation of 40 "renewal communities". Renewal communities would receive special tax breaks designed to encourage economic growth by generating business investment and job opportunities. Requirements to being designated a renewal community included having a high rate of poverty and high unemployment rate (compared to rates nationwide). The communities must have under 200,000 people in them, but can be any physical size. Local and state governments must be involved with a community gaining this designation. They are required to participate by making their own commitments to taking action to reduce economic burdens on employers and businesses in the area, as well as taking steps to encourage economic growth. If a community is successful in becoming a designated renewal community, local business "may be entitled to employer wage credits for full-time employees and summer workers, an expanded expense deduction for tangible assets, an accelerated commercial revitalization deduction and a 100% exclusion for capital gains on the sale of certain renewal community business interests or tangible assets."

== Communities ==
The Departments of Housing and Urban Development (HUD) and Agriculture (USDA) have designated RCs and EZs in three competitions since 1994. Currently, there are 40 HUD RCs, 28 of which are in urban areas and 12 in rural communities. There are 30 HUD EZs, all of which are in urban areas. There are 10 USDA EZs in rural communities only. A couple of RCs have as few as approximately 100 businesses, while several RCs and EZs have more than 5,000 businesses. No RC or EZ has a population greater than 200,000.

Qualifying businesses in RCs are eligible for employment credits (up to $1,500 yearly per RC resident employed). Qualifying RC businesses are also eligible for a 0% tax on the capital gains of assets sold, provided the business holds the asset at least five years. Businesses in RCs that build or substantially rehabilitate commercial property may also be eligible for up to $10 million in Commercial Revitalization Deductions to rapidly increase their depreciation schedules. For detailed information on all RC/EZ tax incentives, including which tax forms to file to claim the incentives, read IRS Publication 954, Tax Incentives for Distressed Communities, available on the IRS website at www.irs.gov.

The renewal community employment credit provides businesses with an incentive to hire individuals who both live and work in a renewal community. Employers can claim the credit if they pay or incur “qualified zone wages” to a “qualified zone employee”. The credit is for wages paid or incurred after 2001. The credit is 15% of the qualified wages paid or incurred during a calendar year. The amount of qualified wages you can use to figure the credit cannot be more than $10,000 for each employee for each calendar year. As a result, the credit can be as much as $1,500 (15% of $10,000) per qualified employee each year.

These areas have been designated renewal communities:

Greene-Sumter County, Alabama	Mobile County, Alabama	Southern Alabama	Los Angeles, California	Orange Grove, California	Parlier, California	San Diego, California	San Francisco, California	Atlanta, Georgia
Chicago, Illinois	Eastern Kentucky	Central Louisiana	New Orleans, Louisiana	Northern Louisiana	Ouachita Parish, Louisiana	Lawrence, Massachusetts	Lowell, Massachusetts	Detroit, Michigan
Flint, Michigan	West Central Mississippi	Turtle Mountain Band of Chippewa, North Dakota	Camden, New Jersey	Newark, New Jersey	Buffalo-Lackawanna, New York	Jamestown, New York	Niagara Falls, New York	Rochester, New York
Schenectady, New York	Hamilton, Ohio	Youngstown, Ohio	Philadelphia, Pennsylvania	Charleston, South Carolina	Chattanooga, Tennessee	Memphis, Tennessee	Corpus Christi, Texas	El Paso County, Texas
Burlington, Vermont	Tacoma, Washington	Yakima, Washington	Milwaukee, Wisconsin					

== See also ==
- Empowerment Zone
- Community Renewal Tax Relief Act of 2000

== Sources ==
- IRS Publication 954. TAX INCENTIVES FOR DISTRESSED COMMUNITIES
- US Department of Housing and Urban Development Questions and Answers on Renewal Community (RC) and Empowerment Zone (EZ) tax incentives
