= Nyiva Mwendwa =

Kenyan politician

Winfred Nyiva Mwendwa

Minister for Culture and Social Services
- Incumbent
- Assumed office 9 May 1995
- Constituency: Kitui West Constituency

Personal details
- Born: Kitui District, Kenya
- Party: KANU (1974, 1992), NARC (2002), ODM-Kenya (2007), WDM-K (2013)
- Spouse: Kitili Maluki Mwendwa (d. 1985)
- Children: Kavinya, Maluki
- Education: Alliance Girls High School
- Profession: Politician, Educator
- Awards: Elder of the Golden Heart (EGH)

Winfred Nyiva Mwendwa is a Kenyan politician. She was the first Kenyan woman to serve as a cabinet minister.

== Early life and education ==
She was educated at Alliance Girls High School, and was one of the first ethnic African teachers to be posted to The Kenya High School in the mid-1960s, teaching Domestic Science. She was elected for the post of Kitui West Constituency MP three times, in 1974 and 1992 representing KANU and in 2002 representing NARC. At the 2007 elections she contested the seat on the ODM-Kenya ticket, but lost to Charles Mutisya Nyamai. She was elected the first Kitui County woman representative in the 2013 Kitui local elections on a Wiper Democratic Movement-Kenya (WDM-K) ticket. In 2016, she announced her intention to retire from active politics 40 years since her debut.

== Political life ==
Mwendwa was appointed the Minister for Culture and Social Services on May 9, 1995, becoming the first female minister in Kenya.

She incurred national disfavour in 1995 when she travelled to a women’s conference in Beijing in 1995 and took a hairdresser as part of her delegation. Mwendwa herself defended the decision, stating that, as a delegation leader, she must take care of her appearance.

Her husband Kitili Maluki Mwendwa was Kenyan chief justice and politician. Kitili Mwendwa died in a traffic accident in 1985. He was at the time the Kitui West MP, his seat was taken at the subsequent by-election by his brother Kyale Mwendwa. His other brother, Eliud Ngala Mwendwa is also a former Kenyan minister.

She lives in Matinyani village in Kitui District. Nyiva Mwendwa has two children, Kavinya and Maluki.

== Awards ==
She was awarded with The Order of the Golden Heart of Kenya, 2nd Class, Elder of the Golden Heart (EGH)
