= Kitui West Constituency =

Kenyan electoral constituency

Kitui West
- constituency for the Parliament of Kenya
- Kitui West Constituency within Kitui County

- Kitui County within Kenya
- County: Kitui
- Population: 70,871
- Area: 416 km^{2} (160.6 sq mi)

Current constituency
- Number of members: 1
- Party: Wiper
- Member of Parliament: Edith Vethi Nyenze
- Wards: 4

Kitui West Constituency is an electoral constituency in Kenya. It is one of eight constituencies in Kitui County, which was established for the 1966 elections.

== Members of Parliament ==
| Elections | MP | Party | Notes |
|---|---|---|---|
| 1966 | Parmenas Nzilu Munyasia | KANU | |
| 1969 | Parmenas Nzilu Munyasia | KANU | One-party system |
| 1974 | Winnie Nyiva Mwendwa | KANU | One-party system |
| 1979 | Parmenas Nzilu Munyasia | KANU | One-party system |
| 1983 | Parmenas Nzilu Munyasia | KANU | One-party system. |
| 1984 | Kitili Maluki Mwendwa | KANU | By-election, One-party system. Mwendwa died in 1985 in traffic accident |
| 1986 | Kyale Mwendwa | KANU | By-election, One-party system. |
| 1988 | Kyale Mwendwa | KANU | One-party system. |
| 1992 | Winnie Nyiva Mwendwa | KANU | |
| 1997 | Francis Nyenze | KANU | |
| 2002 | Winnie Nyiva Mwendwa | NARC | |
| 2007 | Charles Mutisya Nyamai | NARC | |
| 2013 | Francis Nyenze | WDM-K | |
| 2017 | Francis Nyenze | WDM-K | Nyenze died on December 6, 2017, barely three months after being sworn in for another term. He had battled colon cancer for almost a decade. |
| 2018 | Edith Vethi Nyenze | WDM-K | won by a landslide to succeed her Husband as 7th Member of Parliament for Kitui West and the second woman to represent the constituency after Nyiva Mwendwa. |

== Wards ==
Wards
| Ward | Registered Voters | Local Authority |
| Kalimani / Matinyani / Mutulu | 8,215 | Kitui municipality |
| Kithumula / Kauma | 5,245 | Kitui municipality |
| Kanyangi / Kiseuni | 6,275 | Kitui county |
| Katutu / Mutanda | 4,395 | Kitui county |
| Kivani / Kauwi | 5,683 | Kitui county |
| Kwa-Vonza | 2,446 | Kitui county |
| Kwa Mutonga / Kathivo | 4,315 | Kitui county |
| Musengo / Usiani | 5,832 | Kitui county |
| Mutonguni / Kakeani | 8,672 | Kitui county |
| Yatta / Nthongoni | 7,240 | Kitui county |
| Total | 58,318 | |
*September 2005.
