= Beatrice Wanjiku =

Kenyan visual and abstract artist (born 1978)

Beatrice Wanjikū
- Born: 1978 (age 47–48); Ngong Hills, Kenya
- Citizenship: Kenyan
- Education: Undisclosed High School (High School Diploma); Buruburu Institute of Fine Arts (Diploma in Fine Art)
- Occupation: Fine artist
- Years active: 2000–present
- Title: Abstract Artist

Beatrice Wanjikū, is a Kenyan visual and abstract artist, who practices independently in Nairobi, the capital city of Kenya.

== Early life and education ==
Beatrice was born in the Ngong Hills Area in 1978. After attending local primary and secondary schools, she was admitted to the Buruburu Institute of Fine Arts, in Buruburu, a neighborhood in Nairobi, the capital city of Kenya. In 2002, she graduated with a Diploma in Fine Art.

== Career ==
Her work is divided into distinct phases (a) Mortality Phase (b) X-ray Phase (c) American Experience Phase (d) Introspective Phase.

Mortality Phase

This phase reflects Beatrice's personal feels of profound personal loss, following the death of her mother, with whom she was very close.

X-Ray Phase

In this phase, she appears to strip away the exterior of her subject and look directly "into the very soul of her subject".

American Experience Phase

In the second decade of the 21st century, Beatrice spent three months in the state of Vermont in the United States. Her visit coincided with the Occupy Wall Street Movement. This phase of her art involves work with embedded newspaper clippings on the topic from this period.

Introspective Phase

This phase continues the search for the soul and internal meaning. One piece from this phase is "The Strangeness of My Madness" and another one shows weeping teeth.

== Other consideration ==
Beatrice Wanjiku has exhibited her work in galleries and public and private exhibitions internationally.

== See also ==
- Wangechi Mutu
- Ingrid Mwangi
- Kawira Mwirichia
