= Kitui East Constituency =

Kenyan electoral constituency

Kitui East Constituency, formerly Mutito Constituency is an electoral constituency in Kenya. It is one of eight constituencies in Kitui County. The constituency was established for the 1988 elections. The constituency has seven wards, all electing Members of County Assembly for the Kitui County Assembly.

== Members of Parliament ==
Elections	MP	Party	Notes
1988	Ezekiel Mwikya Mweu	KANU	One-party system.
1992	Ndambuki M. Mutinda	KANU	
1997	Jimmy Muthusi Kitonga	SDP	
2002	Kiema Kilonzo	Ford-People	
2007	Kiema Kilonzo	ODM-Kenya	
2013	Major (Rtd) Mutua Muluvi	WDM-K	
2017	Nimrod Mbai	Jubilee	

== Locations and wards ==
Locations
Location	Population*
Endau	6,687
Kaliku	6,409
Kyamatu	6,998
Malalani	6,109
Mutitu	10,385
Mwitika	10,186
Nzambani	26,921
Nzangathi	9,193
Voo	11,532
Zombe	11,039
Total	x
1999 census.

Wards
Ward	Registered Voters
Kyanika / Maluma	6,521
Malalani / Endau	4,509
Mutitu / Kaliku	6,813
Mwitika / Kyamatu	5,839
Sombe	3,789
Thua / Nzangathi / Ithumula	6,602
Voo	3,721
Total	37,794
*September 2005.
