= Diocese of Machakos =

The Diocese of Machakos may refer to:

- Anglican Diocese of Machakos, in the city of Machakos, Kenya
- Roman Catholic Diocese of Machakos, in the city of Machakos, Kenya
