= Community Renewal Tax Relief Act of 2000 =

United States Congress bill

- Long title: To amend the Internal Revenue Code of 1986 to provide for community revitalization and a 2-year extension of medical saving accounts, and for other purposes.
- Announced in: the 106th United States Congress
- Sponsored by: Rep. William Reynolds Archer Jr. (R-TX)
- Number of co-sponsors: 1

Citations
- Public law: Incorporated into Pub. L. 106–554 (text) (PDF)

Legislative history
- Introduced in the House as H.R. 5662 by Rep. William Reynolds Archer Jr. (R-TX) on December 14, 2000; Committee consideration by United States House Committee on Ways and Means

The Community Renewal Tax Relief Act of 2000 (H.R. 5662) is a bill that was introduced into the United States House of Representatives during the 106th United States Congress. The Act was eventually passed as part of the Consolidated Appropriations Act, 2001.

The Community Renewal Tax Relief Act of 2000 is intended to improve development in economically distressed areas of the United States. The law offers "tax incentives for businesses to locate and hire residents in urban and rural areas that have not experienced recent economic expansion." Both rural and urban areas are eligible. Three primary means were used: renewal communities, empowerment zones, and community development entities. The bill also created the New Markets Tax Credit Program, which has been renewed several times and is still in effect.

== Provisions of the bill ==
One provision of the Community Renewal Tax Relief Act of 2000 was the creation of 40 "renewal communities". Renewal communities would receive special tax breaks designed to encourage economic growth by generating business investment and job opportunities. Requirements to being designated a renewal community included having a high rate of poverty and high unemployment rate (compared to rates nationwide). The communities must have under 200,000 people in them, but can be any physical size. Local and state governments must be involved with a community gaining this designation. They are required to participate by making their own commitments to taking action to reduce economic burdens on employers and businesses in the area, as well as taking steps to encourage economic growth. If a community is successful in becoming a designated renewal community, local business "may be entitled to employer wage credits for full-time employees and summer workers, an expanded expense deduction for tangible assets, an accelerated commercial revitalization deduction and a 100% exclusion for capital gains on the sale of certain renewal community business interests or tangible assets."

Another provision of the Community Renewal Tax Relief Act of 2000 was the improvement and expansion of an existing program of "empowerment zones." The law authorized the creation of additional empowerment zones, which were originally created in 1993, and the expansion of some of the tax incentives available. These incentives include that businesses located in these zones "will enjoy a wage credit for certain employees, increased expensing of some property, a 60% exclusion of gain from the sale of their stock, deferral of gain on qualifying assets if the proceeds are reinvested in appropriate replacement assets and easier access to tax-exempt financing."

A third provision of the Community Renewal Tax Relief Act of 2000 was the establishment of tax incentives for investment or loans provided to small businesses in low-income communities. This tax credit, known as the New Markets Tax Credit Program, is established for investments in community development entities (CDEs). CDEs have three official characteristics: their primary mission is to serve low-income communities and people, they are accountable to residents and include them on their governing boards, and they receive certification as a CDE from the U.S. Department of the Treasury.

== Congressional Research Service summary ==
This summary is based largely on the summary provided by the Congressional Research Service, a public domain source.

Title I: Community Renewal and New Markets

Subtitle A: Tax Incentives for Renewal Communities - Authorizes the Secretary of Housing and Urban Development to designate (upon local or State nomination) up to 40 renewal communities, of which at least 12 shall be in rural areas.

- Requires for nomination purposes that: (1) the area be experiencing high rates of poverty and unemployment and general distress; and (2) State and local governments enter into written contracts with community organizations to promote specified economic growth and employment activities.
- Excludes from gross income capital gains on the sale or exchange of a qualified community asset (stock, business property, or partnership interest) held for more than five years.
- Allows: (1) a renewal community employment credit; (2) a commercial revitalization deduction; (3) increased expensing for renewal community business assets; and (4) the work opportunity credit for hiring youth residing in renewal communities.

Subtitle B: Extension and Expansion of Empowerment Zone Incentives - Provides for the designation of additional empowerment zones and increased empowerment zone tax incentives.
Subtitle C: New Markets Tax Credit- Establishes a new markets tax credit with respect to specified qualified low-income community investments. Sets a national new markets tax credit limitation.
Subtitle D: Improvements in Low-Income Housing Credit - Amends the Code, with respect to the low-income housing credit, to revise the formula for the State housing credit ceiling. Provides for cost-of-living adjustments to the State ceiling.

- (Sec. 132) Revises the housing priority selection criteria a housing credit agency must use to develop a qualified plan for allocating housing credit dollar amounts among projects. Requires such criteria to include: (1) whether the project would use existing housing as part of a community revitalization plan; (2) tenant populations of individuals with children; and (3) projects intended for eventual tenant ownership. Drops from such criteria participation of local tax-exempt organizations. Requires a qualified allocation plan to give preference in making allocations to projects located in qualified census tracts whose development contributes to a concerted community revitalization plan.
- (Sec. 133) Requires housing credit agencies to: (1) provide for a comprehensive market study (by a disinterested party, at the developer's expense) of the housing needs of low-income individuals in the area to be served by the project before the credit allocation is made; and (2) make public a written explanation for any allocation of a housing credit dollar amount not made in accordance with the agency's established priorities and selection criteria.
- (Sec. 134) Revises special rules for the determination of the adjusted basis of buildings eligible for the low-income housing credit. Requires adjusted basis to include property used throughout the taxable year in providing any community service facility designed to serve primarily individuals (even if they are not tenants) whose income is 60 percent or less of area median income.
- Declares that assistance under the Native American Housing Assistance and Self-Determination Act of 1996 shall be disregarded in determining whether a building is federally subsidized for purposes of the low-income housing credit.
- (Sec. 135) Revises the definition of a qualified building (placed in service not later than the second calendar year following a housing credit dollar amount allocation) with respect to which the amount of a low-income housing credit may exceed the credit amount allocated to the building. Sets an alternative date for valuation of the taxpayer's actual basis in the project of which the building is a part (where the actual basis is more than ten percent of the taxpayer's reasonably expected basis). Allows the valuation of the actual basis to be as of the later of the date which is six months after the date that the allocation was made or (as currently) the close of the calendar year in which the allocation is made. Revises the formula for determination of the amount of State housing credit ceiling returned in a calendar year to include the dollar amount previously allocated to a project which fails to meet the ten percent test on a date after the close of the calendar year in which the allocation was made.
- Revises special rules for the increased basis of a building located in certain high cost areas to redefine a qualified census tract to include, as an alternative to existing criteria, a tract with a poverty rate of at least 25 percent.
- (Sec. 136) Revises the formula for determining unused housing credit carryovers allocated among certain States.

Subtitle E: Other Community Renewal and New Markets Assistance

Part I: Provisions Relating to Housing and Substance Abuse Prevention and Treatment - Amends the Departments of Veterans Affairs and Housing and Urban Development, and Independent Agencies Appropriations Act, 1997 to direct the Secretary to transfer ownership of qualified HUD-held properties (substandard or unoccupied multifamily or unoccupied single family properties) to local governments and community development corporations under specified conditions. Requires such properties to be held by HUD for at least six months.

- (Sec. 142) Directs the Secretary, upon request of the appropriate jurisdiction, to designate as a revitalization area all portions of such jurisdiction meeting the necessary criteria.
- (Sec. 143) Revises the current demonstration mortgage reinsurance program to: (1) make such program a risk-sharing program served by private mortgage insurers and insured community development financial institutions (as defined by this Act); (2) enlarge the program to four administrative areas; and (3) require such entities to assume a secondary percentage of loss of an insured mortgage.
- (Sec. 144) Permits a religious organization to receive Federal funding through the Substance Abuse and Mental Health Services Administration. Prohibits funding discrimination against such an organization so long as its program is implemented in a manner consistent with the Establishment Clause of the first amendment to the Constitution.

Part II: Advisory Council on Community Renewal - Advisory Council on Community Renewal Act - Establishes the Advisory Council on Community Renewal Act to advise the Secretary of Housing and Urban Development on the designation of renewal communities and on the exercise of authorities granted to the Secretary pursuant to this title.

Subtitle F: Other Provisions - Provides for an accelerated phase-in of specified increases in the volume cap on private activity bonds.

- (Sec. 162) Repeals the targeted area limitation on the expense deduction for environmental remediation costs and to extend the termination date of such deduction from December 31, 2001, to June 30, 2003.
- (Sec. 163) Extends the DC homebuyer tax credit for two additional years.
- (Sec. 164) Extends DC Enterprise Zone provisions for an additional year.
- (Sec. 165) Expands and extends the enhanced deduction for corporate donations of computer technology.
- (Sec. 166) Provides for the treatment of Indian tribal governments under Federal Unemployment Tax Act.

Title II: Two-Year Extension of Availability of Medical Savings Accounts

Extends, for two years the availability of medical savings accounts. Renames such accounts Archer MSAs.

Title III: Administrative and Technical Provisions

Subtitle A: Administrative Provisions - Sets forth various administrative provisions, including provisions concerning: (1) the exemption of certain reporting requirements; (2) the extension of deadlines for IRS compliance with certain notice requirements; (3) the extension of authority for undercover operations; (4) confidentiality of certain documents relating to closing and similar agreements and to agreements with foreign governments; (5) an increase in the threshold for Joint Committee reports on refunds and credits; (6) the treatment of missing children with respect to certain tax benefits; (7) the prevention of the duplication of loss through the assumption of liabilities giving rise to a deduction; and (8) the disclosure of certain return information to the Congressional Budget Office, but only concerning long-term social security and medicare models.
Subtitle B: Technical Corrections - Makes amendments to the: (1) Ticket to Work and Work Incentives Improvement Act of 1999; (2) Tax and Trade Relief Extension Act of 1998; (3) Internal Revenue Service Restructuring and Reform Act of 1998; (4) Taxpayer Relief Act of 1997; (5) Balanced Budget Act of 1997; (6) Small Business Job Protection Act of 1996; and (7) Revenue Reconciliation Act of 1990.

Title IV: Tax Treatment of Securities Futures Contracts

States that, in general, a gain or loss attributable to the sale or exchange of a futures contract shall be considered gain or loss from the sale or exchange of property which has the same character as the property to which the contract relates has in the hands of the taxpayer if acquired by the taxpayer.

== Procedural history ==
The Community Renewal Tax Relief Act of 2000 was introduced into the House on December 14, 2000 by Rep. William Reynolds Archer Jr. (R-TX). It was referred to the United States House Committee on Ways and Means. It was eventually incorporated into H.R. 4577, the Consolidated Appropriations Act, 2001, which became Pub. L. 106–554 (text) (PDF).

== History ==
The Community Renewal Tax Relief Act of 2000 was passed in December 2000. At that time, the New Markets Tax Credit was scheduled to be a seven-year program. It was then reauthorized in subsequent years.

Empowerment zone designations were set to expire at the end of 2011, but were extended until December 31, 2013 after President Barack Obama signed into law the American Taxpayer Relief Act of 2012. Under rules from the Internal Revenue Service, all Empowerment Zone designations were extended unless they actively requested not to be extended.

On June 11, 2013, Senator Jay Rockefeller (D-WV) introduced the New Markets Tax Credit Extension Act of 2013 (S. 1133), which would make one component of the Community Renewal Tax Relief Act of 2000 permanent.

== See also ==
- 106th United States Congress
- New Markets Tax Credit Program
- Empowerment zone
- Renewal community
- United States Department of Housing and Urban Development
