= WPP-Scangroup =

Kenyan marketing company

WPP-Scangroup Limited
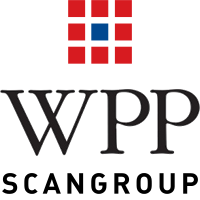
- Company type: Public company
- Traded as: KN: SCAN
- Industry: Advertising & Communication Services
- Founded: 1996
- Headquarters: Nairobi, Kenya
- Key people: Richard Omwella; Chairman; Miriam Kaggwa; Chief Executive Officer
- Revenue: ▲: US$45.04+ million (KES4.504 billion) (2018)
- Total assets: ▲: US$142.68+ million (KES14.42 billion) (2018)
- Parent: WPP plc
- Website: www.wpp-scangroup.com

WPP-Scangroup is a subsidiary of WPP and is listed on the Nairobi Securities Exchange. It is the largest marketing and communication group operating a multi-agency model across multiple disciplines in Sub-Saharan Africa. The group comprises the ad agencies Ogilvy Africa, SCANAD, JWT and BluePrint Marketing; media firms GroupM, MediaCom Africa, Mindshare and MEC; public relations agencies Ogilvy PR (a part of Ogilvy Africa) and H+K Strategies; market research agency Millward Brown; specialty communication firms Roundtrip and Geometry Global; and digital companies OgilvyOne, Squad Digital and SCANAD Digital. In all, over 1200 people are employed across the various organizations. Miriam Kaggwa is the group CEO having replaced Patricia Ithau who stepped down in 2025.

WPP-Scangroup is listed on the Nairobi Securities Exchange. The group has presence in 25 countries in Sub Saharan Africa. Majority-owned offices in Ghana, Kenya, Nigeria, Rwanda, South Africa, Tanzania, Uganda, Zambia and minority owned operations in Burkina Faso, Cameroon, Gabon, Ivory Coast, Namibia, Senegal and Zimbabwe. The group also has affiliate partners in Botswana, DRC, Congo Brazzaville, Madagascar, Malawi, Mauritius, Mozambique, Niger, Reunion and S. Leone.

== History ==
Scangroup Limited was incorporated in Kenya as a private limited liability company on 26 January 1999 under the name Media Initiative East Africa Limited. In October 2005 the company changed its name to Scangroup Limited. Scangroup listed on the Nairobi Securities Exchange on 29 August 2006 and is currently the only marketing services company listed on the exchange. In late 2013 Scangroup became a subsidiary of WPP and subsequently the company renamed itself to WPP-Scangroup Limited on 15 June 2015.

== Ownership ==
Since 2006, the company' s shares are listed on the Nairobi Stock Exchange, where it trades under the symbol:SCAN. Its largest shareholder is the WPP Group, controlling 50.10% of the issued share capital of Scangroup though its subsidiaries Cavendish Square Holding BV and Ogilvy South Africa. As of May 2014, the ten largest investors in the company were:

Scangroup Stock Ownership
Rank	Name of Owner	Number of Shares	Percentage Ownership
1	Cavendish Square Holding B.V	176,903,560	46.69
2	Bharat Kumar Thakrar and Sadhna Bharat Thakrar	51,811,360	13.68
3	Ogilvy and Mather South Africa (Proprietary) Limited	12,907,856	3.41
4	Standard Chartered Nominees, Non-Resident A/C KE 9273	12,743,900	3.36
5	White, Andrew John Laird	12,206,000	3.22
6	Standard Chartered Nominees Account KE 17984	10,845,793	2.86
7	Standard Chartered Nominees, Non-Resident A/C 9944	9,901,400	2.61
8	CFC Stanbic Nominee Limited A/C NR1030625	5,677,500	1.50
9	Standard Chartered Nominees Account KE17605	2,544,120	0.67
10	Standard Chartered Nominees A/C 9098AC	2,352,080	0.62
	Total	297,893,569	78.63

== WPP-Scangroup Companies ==
The companies within Scangroup include, but are not limited to the following:

- Ogilvy Kenya Limited, Nairobi, Kenya
- Milward Brown East Africa Limited, Nairobi, Kenya
- Ogilvy Africa, Nairobi, Kenya
- O&M Africa BV, Netherlands
- Hill & Knowlton East Africa Limited, Nairobi, Kenya
- Ogilvy Tanzania Limited, Dar es Salaam, Tanzania
- Redsky Limited, Nairobi, Kenya
- Scanad Kenya, Nairobi, Kenya
- Scanad East Africa Limited, Nairobi, Kenya
- BroLl WesT™, Nairobi, Kenya
- J. Walter Thompson Kenya Limited, Nairobi, Kenya
- Squad Digital Limited, Nairobi, Kenya
- Mediacompete East Africa Limited, Nairobi, Kenya
- Grey East Africa Limited, Nairobi, Kenya
- Scanad Uganda Limited, Kampala, Uganda
- Scanad Tanzania Limited, Dar es Salaam, Tanzania
- Roundtrip Limited, Nairobi, Kenya

== See also ==
- WPP Group Plc
- Ogilvy & Mather
- Nairobi Stock Exchange
- Economy of Kenya
