= Jinna Mutune =

Kenyan film producer and director

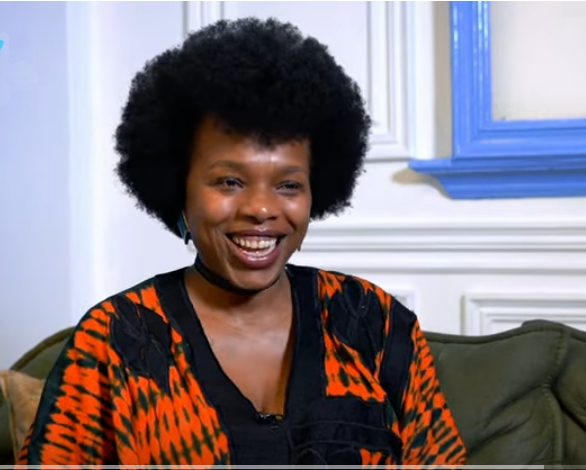
- Born: Nairobi
- Citizenship: Kenyan
- Occupations: Film producer Director; Screenwriter
- Known for: Leo (2012 film)
- Notable work: Leo; AVoice4Peace

Jinna Mutune is a Kenyan film producer, screenwriter and director.

== Early life and education ==
Mutune grew up in Nairobi, Kenya, in a middle-class family in Eastland's Kimathi Estate. She studied at the South African School of Motion Picture Medium and Live Performance and also studied film in the United States. After film school in South Africa, she went back to Kenya for a while and then moved to the U.S., living in Boston, Houston and California. Mutune stated that she knew she wanted to be a filmmaker at age sixteen and by that time had also been directing plays at church and at her school.

== Career ==
Mutune is the director of Leo, a story told through the eyes of a Maasai boy who wants to live out his dreams. Leo was her first feature film and it was also funded by her own production company, Pegg Entertainment, with cinematography by Abraham Martinez. Leo premiered in Nairobi in April 2011, but only to small venues: the film debuted on the "big screen" in Kenya in November 2012. The U.S. premiere of Leo was well received by Kenyans and Americans, and Mutune appeared on Kenya TV to discuss the film. Mutune also organized a business deal with the airlines Kenya Airways and Emirates, to show Leo in-flight. She also directed the film Chep, which was also produced by Pegg Entertainment. Chep, a movie about a female marathon runner, set in the 1970s and celebrating women and the men who support them, was released in 2016. In addition to her feature films, she also produced the music video for the Kenyan Official Olympic score (2012) and worked with Graça Machel on a public service announcement.

== Filmography ==
Year	Title	Role	Category	Ref.
2012	Leo	Writer Producer Director	Adventure Drama	
2017	AVoice4Voice	Co-Producer	Documentary	
