= Nduku Kilonzo =

Kenyan public health researcher and educator

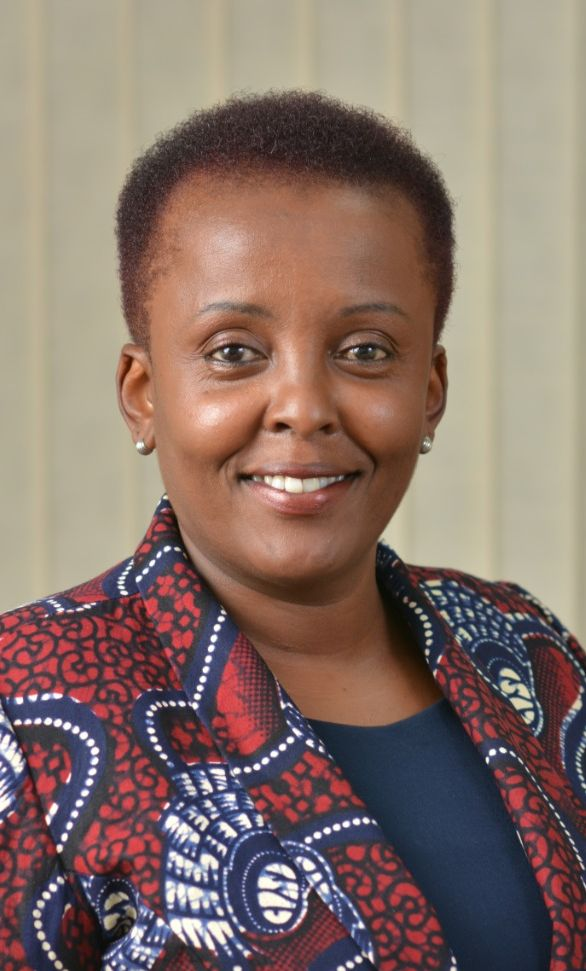
- Born: July 1974 (age 52); Makueni county, Kenya
- Citizenship: Kenya
- Education: Moi University, KenyaLiverpool School of Tropical Medicine (PhD in Tropical Medicine, Gender & Health)
- Occupations: Educator, Businesswoman
- Years active: 2008 — present
- Known for: Public Health, Research
- Title: Director; National Aids Control Council of Kenya

Nduku Kilonzo is a Kenyan public health researcher who was the executive director of the National Aids Control Council (NACC) of Kenya, from 2014 to 2020.

== Background ==
During the 1990s, while working as a teacher in rural Kenya, she became aware of the gender disparities facing her female students. As time passed, Nduku focused on the relationship between gender-based violence and the spread of HIV. Later, she studied at the Liverpool School of Tropical Medicine, graduating with a PhD in Tropical Medicine, Gender and Health. From there, she immediately began work at LVCT from 2008 to 2014. Until she was appointed as the CEO of NSDCC (National Syndemic Diseases Control Council) formerly known as NACC (National Aids Control Council) at the time, from 2014 to 2020. By 2020, during the COVID-19 pandemic, after her contract with NSDCC ended.

== Career ==
In 2012, she became manager of the Kenyan non-profit organization, LVCT, a Kenyan NGO focusing on reducing the transmission of HIV/AIDS. In May 2014, she was appointed to her present position of executive director of the National Aids Control Council (NACC) of Kenya.

She is also an Advisor in Gender and Rights Advocacy Panel to the World Health Organization. She serves as an editor of Reproductive Health Matters, a peer review journal and is a member of the Public Health Association of Kenya. She is a Commissioner with the Lancet Commission for Health in Sub-Saharan Africa.
