= Charles Mutisya Nyamai =

Kenyan politician

Charles Mutisya Nyamai is a Kenyan politician. He belongs to the National Rainbow Coalition (NARC) and has been elected to represent the Kitui West Constituency in the National Assembly of Kenya since the 2007 Kenyan general election.
