= Ke ʻAupuni Lokahi =

Former non-profit on Molokai, Hawaii

Ke ʻAupuni Lokahi (Hawaiian for "The Government of Unity") was a non-profit organization created to administer the United States Department of Agriculture's (USDA) Enterprise Community Grant awarded to the Molokai, Hawaii community in 1998 for a span of 10 years. The Rural Enterprise Community Grant was awarded by the USDA to communities throughout the United States that had high rates of poverty and whose residents put together comprehensive strategic plans for job creation and community improvement. As of January 2008 the Molokai Enterprise Community had received slightly more than $25 million.

== Structure ==
Ke ʻAupuni Lokahi had a small administrative staff and an 11-member Board of Directors which voted on both current and new project and initiative changes. According to USDA EZ/EC guidelines, no less than 55% of Enterprise Community Boards could be composed of members elected by each communities' residents, while the other 45% were appointed by other board members. Each board member served two year terms before having to be re-elected by the community, or re-appointed by the rest of the board.

== Projects ==
The Molokai Community started out with a total of 40 projects for Ke ʻAupuni Lokahi to work on and to provide funding to. There had been some undeniable successes realized by the Enterprise Community Grant on Molokai, including the outfitting of 300 applicants' homes with solar energy systems, to offset the extraordinarily high residential energy costs faced by Molokai's homeowners.

Ke ʻAupuni Lokahi had also been instrumental in purchasing farm machinery for Molokai's Hoʻolehua Homestead Association to cut down on the costs faced by Molokai's taro farmers, many of whom are engaged in subsistence farming practices.

In its 2008 Annual Report Executive Summary the Molokai Enterprise Community noted that it moved forward with 25 projects outlined over its 10-year history and highlighted five projects: Molokai Community Health Center (MCHC), the incorporation of the Molokai Affordable Homes & Community Development Corporation (MAHCDC), the implementation of the Hawaii Tourism Authority for services related to the enhancement to the Ala Pala’u trails project, the Molokai Land Trust to support conservation and open space preservation, and the 90% restoration efforts of the historic Kalanianaole Hall.

== Master Land-Use Plan ==
Ke ʻAupuni Lokahi's most controversial project was its support of the Community-Based Master Land Use Plan, which was created in conjunction with Molokai's largest landowner Molokai Properties Limited (known as Molokai Ranch to locals). Molokai Ranch would donate 26,400 acres (107 km^{2}) of land back to the Molokai community in the form of a land trust. In exchange, Laʻau Point, a remote area of southwestern Molokai, would be re-zoned for residential land use, from its current designation as agricultural land, so that Molokai Ranch could construct 200 luxury homes in the area.

The support given by the Ke ʻAupuni Lokahi board divided the Molokai community, and there were several protests held at board meetings, at Laʻau Point, and at the Office of Hawaiian Affairs headquarters in Honolulu. Among the communities concerns were what will happen to the small island's social demographics if Molokai becomes a haven for the wealthy, and whether the island had enough potable water in its various wells to transport the needed amounts from the wetter east end to the more arid west.

Community members successfully opposed Molokai Ranch's attempt to expand through the "Save La'au Point" movement and as a result, on March 24, 2008 what was then the island's largest employer decided to shut down all operations including hotels, a movie theater, restaurants, and a golf course and dismissed 120 workers.

== Sources ==
- Molokai Enterprise Community on USDA's rural development website
