= New Markets Tax Credit Program =

Federal financial program in the United States

The New Markets Tax Credit (NMTC) Program is a federal financial program in the United States. It aims to stimulate business and real estate investment in low-income communities in the United States via a federal tax credit. The program is administered by the US Treasury Department's Community Development Financial Institutions Fund (CDFI Fund) and allocated by local Community Development Entities (CDEs) across the United States.

== History ==
The New Markets Tax Credit Program was established as part of the Community Renewal Tax Relief Act of 2000. The goal of the program is to stimulate regeneration of low-income and impoverished communities across the United States. The NMTC Program provides tax credits to investors for equity investments in certified Community Development Entities (CDEs), which invest in low-income communities. The credit equals 39% of the investment paid out over seven years (5% in each of the first three years, then 6% in the final four years). A CDE must have a primary mission of investing in low-income communities and people.

The concept of the NMTC emerged in the late 1990s, when numerous foundations and think tanks were promoting the idea of using business-oriented mechanisms to help bring jobs and prosperity to disadvantaged communities. For example, business, community, academic, and public sector participants at the 1997 American Assembly meeting issued a report urging business leaders to reinvest in urban areas in the U.S. The final report also called for nonprofit and government officials to assist this new effort to open untapped markets by fostering "community capitalism", which it defined as a "for-profit, business-driven expansion of investment, job creation, and economic opportunities in distressed communities, with government and the community sectors playing key supportive roles". To accomplish this, participants called for easier access to capital (especially through equity investment) and more technical assistance for businesses, seen as the two key ways of "energizing community capitalism in distressed areas". The report set out crucial components of the future New Markets initiative. The American Assembly disseminated the final report widely, including to the White House and Congress. Vice President Al Gore, supporting the conference's conclusions, stated that "the greatest untapped markets in the world are right here at home, in our distressed communities."

== Operation ==
The Community Development Financial Institutions Fund (CDFI Fund) in the U.S. Department of the Treasury was authorized to administer the program. CDEs apply to the CDFI Fund each year for an "allocation authority" (the authority to raise a certain amount of capital, known as Qualified Equity Investments (QEIs), from investors). In 2001, the first year of the program, the CDFI Fund awarded $1 billion in allocation authority to CDEs, enabling them to raise $1 billion in QEIs from investors, which allowed those investors to reduce their federal tax liability by $390 million, 39% of the amount they invested in the CDEs over seven years. For the investors to be entitled to claim the credits over the seven-year compliance period, the CDEs must use "substantially all" ("Sub All") of the QEIs from investors, to make Qualified Low Income Community Investments (QLICIs) in Qualified Active Low Income Community Businesses (QALICBs) located in Low Income Communities (LICs). These specific terms are defined in the Internal Revenue Code and other federal guidance.

== Allocation rounds ==
As of 2010, there had been eight NMTC allocation rounds. Allocation awards for a prior round are typically made within the first quarter of the calendar year after a round. In the eighth round (2010), the CDFI fund awarded the $3.5 billion allocation authority pool (generating $1.365 billion in tax credits) to 99 CDEs chosen from 250 applicants, who had requested allocations totaling $23.5 billion. By 2021, there have been 16 rounds of allocations for a total award amount of over $60 billion.

Round	Year(s)	Total Allocation		
1	2001–2002	$2,491,000,000		
2	2003–2004	$3,500,000,000		
3	2005	$2,000,000,000		
4	2006	$4,100,000,000		
5	2007	$3,909,000,000		
6	2008	$5,000,000,000		
7	2009	$5,000,000,000		
8	2010	$3,500,000,000		
9	2011	$3,600,000,000		
10	2012	$3,500,000,000		
11	2013	$3,500,000,000		
12	2014	$3,500,000,000		
13	2015-2016	$7,000,000,000		
14	2017	$3,500,000,000		
15	2018	$3,500,000,000		
16	2019	$3,548,485,000		
17	2020	$5,000,000,000		
18	2021	$5,000,000,000		
19	2022	$5,000,000,000	Total	$75,999,999,999

== Status of the Program in the Internal Revenue Code ==
The New Markets Tax Credit is outlined in Section 45D of the Internal Revenue Code. Unlike many other tax credit programs (such as the Low-Income Housing Tax Credit Program, which was made a permanent part of the Internal Revenue Code in 1993 under the Clinton administration), as a non-permanent program, the New Markets Tax Credit has required renewal during each session of Congress. Most recently, the New Markets Tax Credit program was extended as part of Section 733 of the Tax Relief, Unemployment Insurance Reauthorization, and Job Creation Act of 2010.

The NMTC program expired on December 31, 2011, along with several dozen of the so-called "tax extenders". It was retroactively renewed in H.R. 8, the American Taxpayer Relief Act of 2012 for another 2 years until January 2014.

U.S. Senators Jay Rockefeller (D-West Virginia) and Roy Blunt (R-Missouri) introduced S.B. 1133, "New Markets Tax Credit Extension Act of 2013" in June 2013 to permanently add New Market Tax Credits to the Internal Revenue Code, however the program expired in January 2014 without the bill passing.

The program does continue. Per the CDFI, "as of the end of FY 2016, the NMTC Program has...financed over 5,400 businesses."

== See also ==
- Community Renewal Tax Relief Act of 2000
- Empowerment zone
- United States Department of Housing and Urban Development
