= Wilfred Musau =

Wilfred Mutuku Musau
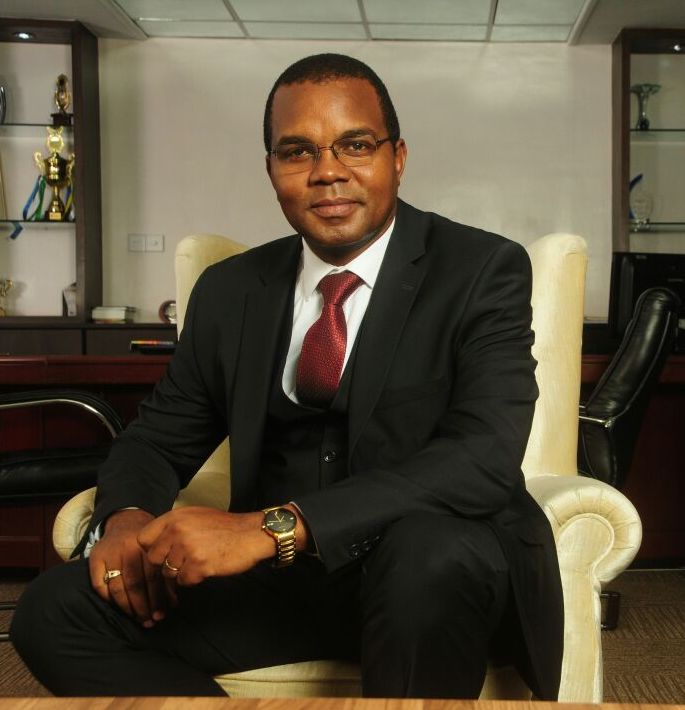
- Mr. Musau in his office
- Born: 1974; Nairobi Kenya
- Education: Kenyatta University (Bachelor of Commerce in Banking and Finance), Masters in Strategy from the University of Stellenbosch Business School
- Occupation: Banker
- Years active: Since 1999
- Title: Director of Special Projects at KCB Group

Wilfred Musau (1974) is the immediate former Managing Director, CEO & Executive Director of National Bank of Kenya. A position he took over from Munir Sheikh Ahmed in the year 2016. In his first year as CEO he led the bank to profitability bouncing back from a huge loss the previous year. The following year profits were up 190%. Prior to joining National Bank he had worked in various notable positions in several banks in Kenya including Kenya Commercial Bank, NIC Bank, Barclays Bank of Kenya and Standard Chartered Bank.

== Background & Education ==
Mr. Musau is a Bachelor of Commerce holder from Kenyatta University, Major in Banking and Finance. He also a Masters Class Certification in Strategy from the University of Stellenbosch Business School in South Africa. He holds other qualifications in both Banking and Leadership certifications including UK Euro Money training in Advanced Corporate Banking, Master class in SME Banking and Master class in Retail Banking.

== Career ==
Mr. Musau started out his career in Standard Chartered Bank. He later moved to Barclays Bank before moving to KCB Bank Kenya Limited then later NIC Bank, from where he moved to National Bank.

Mr. Musau joined National Bank as the Director Retail and Premium Banking. He was later appointed as the acting MD & CEO of National Bank between September 2015 and October 2016.

Prior to going National Bank of Kenya, Mr. Musau held several senior management positions at NIC Bank, Barclays Bank of Kenya, Standard Chartered Bank and KCB Bank group including Deputy MD & Head of Corporate Banking in KCB Rwanda, Head of Branch Business at NIC Bank Kenya, Head of Business Banking at NIC Bank Kenya, Head of SME Banking at KCB Kenya among other.

While at KCB Bank, Mr. Musau was attributed as being the brains behind the KCB SME Biashara club.

== See also ==
- National Bank of Kenya
