= Julius Muia =

Kenyan accountant (born 1960)

- Born: Kenya
- Citizenship: Kenya
- Education: University of Nairobi (Bachelor of Commerce in Accounting) (Master of Business Administration) (Doctor of Philosophy in Finance); Institute of Certified Public Accountants of Kenya (Certified Public Accountant)
- Occupations: Principal Secretary, Kenyan Ministry of Finance
- Years active: 1989 — present
- Known for: Professional competence
- Title: Doctor

Julius Monzi Muia (born c. 1960), often referred to as Julius Muia, is a Kenyan accountant and financial expert, who serves as the Principal Secretary in the Kenyan Ministry of Finance, since 24 July 2019. Before he was appointed to his current position, he served as the Principal Secretary in the State Department for Planning.

== Background and education ==
Muia was born in Kenya circa 1960s. He graduated from the University of Nairobi with a Bachelor of Commerce degree, majoring in Accounting. He also holds a Master of Business Administration degree and a Doctor of Philosophy in Finance, awarded by the same institution. He is a Certified Public Accountant and a Certified Public Secretary.

== Career ==
In addition to his responsibilities as a public servant, he is a member of the teaching faculty as Strathmore Business School, in Nairobi, Kenya's capital city. His expertise in Kenya's public finances, stretches back approximately thirty years. In 2016, President Uhuru Kenyatta appointed him as the director general mandated to drive Kenya towards the realization of Vision 2030. He was transferred to the Finance Ministry on 24 July 2019, to replace Kamau Thugge, who was interdicted on corruption charges.

== See also ==
- Ukur Yatani Kanacho
- Henry Rotich
