= Loreto Convent Msongari =

- Lavington, Nairobi; Africa

Information
- Type: Secondary Education
- Established: 1921
- Website: loretoconventmsongari.com

Loreto Convent Msongari is an all-girls school in Lavington, Nairobi. It was founded by the Sisters of Loreto with Catholic traditions in 1921.

The school teaches two curriculums: the Kenyan 8-4-4 (in primary and high school) and the British IGCSE (high school only) curriculums. The high school has boarding and day facilities while the primary school has day schooling only.

In July 2011, an accident on a school trip cost the lives of three students. The school was found guilty of negligence and ordered to pay Sh16.5 million to another student to cover medical expenses.

In 2023, the school has over 2000 students and 60 teachers.

Loreto Convent Valley Road is a primary school for girls which was set up in 1942 for children who were too young for the convent.
