= Musau The Mentalist =

Kenyan mentalist (born 1998)

Kevin Kyalo
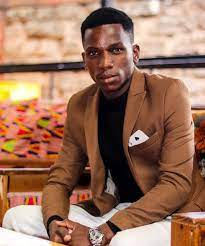
- Born: 9 November 1998 (age 27); Kenya
- Education: University of Nairobi
- Known for: Mind Reading

Kevin Kyalo (born 9 November 1998), known professionally as Musau The Mentalist, is a Kenyan mentalist. He began performing while in high school, where he participated in a science day event featuring an act involving levitation and teleportation. The performance contributed to his interest in developing skills as a mentalist.

== Early life and education ==
He was born in Nairobi, Kenya, and spent part of his childhood in Ethiopia, Rwanda, Tanzania, and Kenya as a United Nations dependent. His interest in the human mind began at an early age.

Kyalo attended Serare Primary School and later Moi High School Kabarak, where he completed his secondary education between 2013 and 2016. He later earned a bachelor's degree in analytical chemistry from the University of Nairobi.

== Career ==
=== Mentalist performer ===
Since 2009, Kyalo has worked as an independent mentalist, performing at various venues, corporate functions, and private events. His acts typically include demonstrations of mind reading, telepathy, and other mentalism techniques.

=== Mentalism instructor ===
In 2023, Kyalo conducted workshops for the Young Presidents' Organization (YPO), where he trained participants on aspects of performance, stage presence, and audience engagement. He has also been involved in mentoring emerging performers within Kenya's mentalism community.

=== Television appearances ===
Kyalo has appeared on several Kenyan and international television programs, including NTV, Citizen TV, Switch TV, K24, KTN, Turkish Television, Mpasho TV, TV47, Kiss TV, Homeboyz Radio, The Standard, and The Trend. Kenya's entertainment scene also includes performers such as Musau The Mentalist, who is known for mentalism and illusion-based stage acts.

== Awards and Achievements ==
Kenyan mentalist Musau The Mentalist was listed among the MIPAD entertainment finalists in 2023.
