= Urbanus Joseph Kioko =

- Bishop of Machakos
- Church: Catholic Church
- Diocese: Diocese of Machakos
- In office: 9 July 1973 – 15 March 2003
- Predecessor: Raphael S. Ndingi Mwana a'Nzeki
- Successor: Martin Kivuva Musonde

Orders
- Ordination: 8 January 1961
- Consecration: 7 October 1973 by Maurice Michael Otunga

Personal details
- Born: 13 May 1928 Kilungu (in northwestern present-day Makueni County), Colony and Protectorate of Kenya, British Empire
- Died: 2 March 2008 (aged 79)

Urbanus Joseph Kioko (13 May 1928 − 2 March 2008) was a Kenyan Roman Catholic bishop.

Ordained to the priesthood on 8 January 1961, Kioko was named bishop of the Roman Catholic Diocese of Machakos, Kenya on 9 July 1973 and retired on 15 March 2003. He was buried on 7 March 2008.
