= Kawira Mwirichia =

Kenyan artist and curator (died 2020)

- Education: BSc. Civil Engineering, University of Nairobi;
- Known for: Art, illustration curator

Kawira Mwirichia (died 2020) was a queer artist and curator from Kenya who lived in Athi River. She was a multidisciplinary artist known internationally for her kangas along with more traditional fine arts mediums such as painting, drawing, and sculpture.

== Early life and education ==
Kawira Mwirichia was born in 1986. She lived in Athi River, Kenya. She died and was laid to rest in November 2020. She received her Bachelor of Civil Engineering from the University of Nairobi (August 2007 to December 2012). Through the Astraea Commslab, Mwirichia took a course for online LGBTQI activism. Her formal art training came from graphic & web design courses at the Institute of Advanced Technology as well as Nairobi Institute of Business Studies.

== Career ==
=== To Revolutionary Type Love ===
Kawira Mwirichia aimed to create Kangas for all 196 countries of the world The design of each Kanga is inspired by that country's historical moments in their fight for LGBT rights. As of 2017, 37 of Africa's 57 countries criminalize homosexual acts.

Kangas are traditional East African cotton textiles with Swahili sayings on them. One of the uses of Kangas is a part of marriage ceremony, where it is laid out on the ground to receive the bride and take her to the wedding, or receive and celebrate the wedded couple.

"In Nairobi, Kenya, there are two different art scenes," artist and activist Kawira Mwirichia explained. "There is the so-called Masai market which draws on traditional crafts and tribal customs, and there is the contemporary art scene, of 'people who are experimenting with other ways of expression.' To Revolutionary Type Love, creates a dialogue between these two creative worlds, as she used traditional textiles to create contemporary Art.

The exhibitions are presented with work from other artists.

=== Lez Ka-lour!: A Lesbian KamaSutra Colouring Book ===
A ten-page colouring book of Lesbian KamaSutra positions by Kawira Mwirichia.

== Exhibitions ==
- To Revolutionary Type Love, Iwaleawahaus at Bayreuth University, 30 June – 30 September 2018
- To Revolutionary Type Love, University of Art HBK, Braunschweig, Germany, June 2018
- "27" hosted by the National Gay & Lesbian Human Rights Commission Shifteye Studios, Nairobi, November 2017
- To Revolutionary Type Love, Goethe Institute, Nairobi, Kenya May 2017
- Jinsiangu's Bodies Unbound, British Institute in Eastern Africa, 2015
- Girl Art Project, GoDown Arts Center, Nairobi, 2011
- 2010 See Us Hear Us Art Festival, Liberty Hall Pangani, Nairobi
- 2010 Changing Faces Changing Spaces Conference, Hilton Hotel, Nairobi
