= Francis Nyenze =

Kenyan politician

Francis Mwanzia Nyenze

Member of Parliament, Kitui West Constituency
- In office 1997 – 2017; Suspended: 2003 – 2013
- Succeeded by: Edith Vethi Nyenze

Minister for Environment
- In office 1997–2001
- President: Daniel arap Moi

Minister for Heritage and Sports
- In office 2001–2002
- President: Daniel arap Moi

Leader of the Minority Party in the National Assembly
- In office 2013–2017
- President: Uhuru Kenyatta

Personal details
- Born: 2 June 1957 Kitui, Kenya Colony
- Died: 6 December 2017 (aged 60) Nairobi, Kenya
- Party: WDM-K
- Spouse: Edith Nyenze
- Children: 3
- Education: University of Nairobi(Architecture Design and Development)

Francis Mwanzia Nyenze (June 2, 1957 – December 6, 2017) was a Kenyan politician who served as Member of Parliament for Kitui West Constituency from 1997 to 2002 and again from 2013 to 2017. He served as Minister for Environment from 1997 until 2001 and Minister for Heritage and Sports from 2001 to 2002. He also served as the Leader of Minority in the National Assembly in the 11th Parliament of Kenya from 2013 to 2017. He passed on at The Nairobi Hospital after battling colon cancer for close to a decade.

== Early life ==
Nyenze was born in Kyondoni village, Kabati in the present day Kitui County. His father the late Reverend Philip Nyenze Mwambu was a renowned Africa Inland Church minister.

Nyenze attended Kyome Boys and Kagumo High School, and was awarded degrees from the University of Nairobi in 1984 and Moi University in 2005.
