= Retirement Benefits Authority of Kenya =

Retirement Benefits Authority
Regulatory Body overview
- Formed: November 20, 1997
- Jurisdiction: Kenya
- Headquarters: Rahimtulla Tower, Nairobi
- Regulatory Body executives: Hon. Abdirahin Haithar Abdi, MGH, Chairman of the Board of Directors; Charles Machira, Chief Executive Officer
- Parent department: National Treasury
- Website: http://www.rba.go.ke

The Retirement Benefits Authority (RBA) is a regulatory body established by the Government of Kenya to supervise the establishment and management of retirement benefits schemes in the Republic of Kenya.

== Establishment ==
Prior to enactment of the Retirement Benefits Act, the retirement benefits sector in Kenya was regulated by fragmented legislation, mostly Trust and Income Tax Laws. Without a specific body or regulations to set industry standards, pension schemes adopted different styles of operation, leading to serious challenges in proper administration of the sector.

RBA was subsequently established by amendment of the Retirement Benefits Act in a bid to resolve the problem by centralizing the administration of the sector within a single entity.

== See also ==
- Capital Markets Authority
