= Kasiva Mutua =

Kenyan percussionist

- Origin: Kenya
- Instrument: Drums
- Years active: 2013 - present

Kasiva Mutua is a Kenyan percussionist. According to Daily News Egypt, she is one of the top drummers in Kenya. Mutua is currently based in Nairobi.

== Biography ==
Mutua learned to play traditional drums from her grandmother at the age of six. In her community in a village in Kenya, it was not permitted for women to play drums, although her grandmother had a small drum that she used when telling stories. In her journey to become a drummer, she faced many problems, including harassment and the destruction of her equipment, due to the taboo against women playing drums. However, she continued to play and began to try out for music festivals when she was in secondary school. Mutua earned a degree in journalism from Busoga University.

She was part of the One Beat program in 2013. Mutua joined the Nile Project in 2014. The project supports artists in countries surrounding and affected by the Nile River and has an activist component. Mutua is a co-founder of an all-women percussion group called MOTRA (for MOdern and TRAditional Rhythms). The group was started in 2015 and includes eight members. She was named a Global TED Fellow in 2017.
