= Kathryne Maundu =

- Born: 1979 (age 46–47); Kenya
- Citizenship: Kenya
- Education: High School Diploma; Bachelor of Laws; Advocates Training Programme; Master of Laws; Certified Public Secretary; Accredited Governance Auditor
- Alma mater: Alliance Girls High School; University of Nairobi; Kenya School of Law; University of London; Institute of Certified Public Secretaries of Kenya
- Occupations: Lawyer; corporate executive; counselor; mentor
- Years active: 2002–present
- Title: Corporation secretary of Safaricom

Kathryne Maundu is a Kenyan lawyer, corporate executive, counselor and mentor, who is the corporation secretary of Safaricom, Kenya's largest mobile network operator.

She is concurrently a senior manager at the Nairobi office of Deloitte, the multinational professional services conglomerate.

== Background and education ==
Maundu was born in Kenya, circa 1979. She obtained her high school diploma from Alliance Girls High School, in the town of Kikuyu, in Kiambu County, in 1996.

She was admitted to the law school of Nairobi University, where she earned a Bachelor of Laws degree in 2002. She went on to attend the Kenya School of Law, where she successfully underwent the Advocates Training Programme. As of December 2018, she was enrolled in the Master of Laws degree course at the University of London, with an expected graduation date in 2022.

Maundu is registered by the Institute of Certified Public Secretaries of Kenya, as a certified public secretary and an accredited governance auditor.

== Career ==
After graduating with her law degree, Maundu worked as an in-house lawyer for Wainaina Ireri Advocates LLP for a year, from 2003 to 2004, then as an associate lawyer at Livingstone Registrars Limited Kenya.

Mwangi joined Deloitte as a consultant from 2007 to 2009. She transitioned to assistant manager in 2010 and was posted to the Tanzania office in Dar es Salaam, where she worked for over two years. In September 2012, she was transferred to the Uganda office, based in Kampala, working there as principal consultant for two years, until August 2015. She was then moved to the Kenya office, rising to senior manager and working there from September 2015 until December 2018. In 2016, she was appointed as corporation secretary at Safaricom PLC; she resigned on September 30, 2023.

In March 2020, she was appointed the company secretary of East African Breweries. On June 27, 2020, Mwangi was appointed the company secretary of British American Tobacco (BAT) Kenya by the board of directors. She was also a partner at Stamford Corporate Services LLP—Bowman's from January 2019 to October 2023. She quit all four firms in October 2023.

On November 15, 2020, the NCBA Group chief executive officer, John Gachora, announced her appointment to the position of company secretary.

== Other considerations ==
Maundu mentors young girls at Safaricom's Mpesa Foundation Academy.

She is single.

In September 2018, Business Daily Africa, an English-language daily newspaper, named Maundu among the "Top 40 Under 40 Women in Kenya 2018."
