= East Africa Law Society =

Regional Bar Association of East Africa

- Abbreviation: EALS
- Formation: 1995
- Type: Professional association
- Purpose: Rule of Law and Justice for all in an Integrated East African Region
- Headquarters: EALS House, Plot No. 310/19, PPF AGM Area, PPF Road off Njiro Road, Arusha, Tanzania
- Location: Arusha, Tanzania
- Region served: East Africa
- Members: Over 42,000 members
- Official language: English
- President: Ramadhan Abubakar Mukira
- Vice President: Masoud Salim
- Secretary General: John Seka
- Chief Executive Officer: David Sigano
- Main organ: Annual General Meeting
- Affiliations: International Bar Association
- Staff: 15
- Website: www.ealawsociety.org

The East Africa Law Society (EALS) is the regional Bar Association of East Africa. It was formed in 1995 and incorporated in Tanzania. The EALS has over 42,000 individual members, and also has seven national Bar associations as members: Law Society of Kenya, Tanganyika Law Society, Uganda Law Society, Zanzibar Law Society, Rwanda Bar Association, Burundi Bar Association, South Sudan Bar Association and Ethiopian Federal Advocates Association . The Ethiopian Federal Advocates Association is the latest Bar Association to join the Society .

The East Africa Law Society works to promote good governance and the rule of law in the East African region and enjoys formal Observer Status with the East African Community and the African Commission on Human and Peoples' Rights. EALS is also a member of the International Coalition for the Responsibility to Protect under which leaders of every country solemnly promise to protect their people from genocide, war crimes, ethnic cleansing, and crimes against humanity.

EALS' top decision-making organ is their annual general meeting at which legal professionals come together to review the previous year's developments and to chart a way forward for the year ahead.
