= Julius Malombe =

Kenyan politician

1st & 3rd County Governor of Kitui
- In office March 2013 – 22 August 2017
- Deputy: Peninah Malonza
- Preceded by: Position established
- Succeeded by: Charity Ngilu
- Incumbent
- Assumed office 22 August 2022
- Deputy: Augustine Kanani
- Preceded by: Charity Ngilu

Personal details
- Born: 1952 (age 73–74)
- Spouse: Edith Malombe

Dr. Julius Makau Malombe, EGH is a Kenyan politician and the first and current elected Governor of Kitui County. He is elected on a Wiper Democratic Movement-Kenya (WDM-K) which he won the 2013 elections garnering 163,904 votes. He defended his seat on Wiper ticket in the 2017 general election but lost to Charity Ngilu coming third behind former senator David Musila however he recaptured the seat and won after the 9 August 2022 gubernatorial elections with 198,004 votes defeating former senator David Musila who had 114,606 votes and Jonathan with 10,639 votes. As the pioneer governor of Kitui he is credited with much of the development gains made in the region. On 12 December 2022 Dr. Malombe was awarded the Elder of the Golden Heart by President William Ruto.

== Education ==
Dr. Malombe began his studies at Matinyani Primary School before moving on to Matinyani Secondary School to complete his O' Levels. He went on to enroll at the University of Nairobi to study a bachelor's in economics. He completed his masters and PhD from Birmingham University, UK.

== Political history ==
Hon.Dr.Malombe joined politics in 2012 upon being nominated as the Kitui gubernatorial candidate by the Wiper Democratic Movement Kenya (WDM-K). He successfully campaigned and was duly elected as the first governor of Kitui County after the 4 March Elections by garnering 163,904 votes defeating Julius Kiema Kilonzo of NARC who had 85,723 votes and Philip Nzamba Kitonga of National Labour Party with 24,574 votes.

He was unsuccessfully in defending his seat in the 2017 elections losing to Charity Ngilu.

In 2019 Dr.Malombe was appointed by President Uhuru Kenyatta as the Chairperson of Kenya Water Towers Agency for a period of 3 years in a gazette notice 3 May 2019.

Hon Dr. Malombe was given a direct nomination by Wiper Democratic Movement Kenya(WDM-K) which was contested in court by Julius Kiema Kilonzo. The court ruled for nominations to be held by Wiper party which Dr. Malombe won and thereafter contested the gubernatorial elections and was duly elected as the 3rd Governor of Kitui after garnering 198,004 votes.

== Awards ==
On 12 December 2022, Dr. Malombe was awarded the Elder of The Golden Heart by President William Ruto.
