= Rawson Macharia =

Witness at the Kapenguria Six trial

Rawson Mbugua Macharia (born 1911, d. 5 December 2008, aged 96) was the key prosecution witness at the trial of the Kapenguria Six, who included Jomo Kenyatta.

Kenyatta and the others were Kenyan nationalists jailed for managing Mau Mau.

== Testimony ==
The six defendants, Kenyatta, Bildad Kaggia, Kung'u Karumba, Fred Kubai, Paul Ngei and Achieng Oneko were arrested in 1952, and tried in 1952–53 for the offence of managing Mau Mau, then a proscribed society.

Macharia testified at this trail that in March 1950, he had taken one of the Mau Mau oaths at Kenyatta's hands. He further claimed that the oath-taking involved stripping naked and drinking human blood. Macharia's submissions were the only evidence of a direct link between Kenyatta and Mau Mau produced before the court. Mau Mau was proscribed in August 1950, so, even had the claims been true, it is unclear that they proved Kenyatta's membership, let alone management, of a proscribed organisation.

== Perjury affidavit ==
In 1958, Macharia swore an affidavit to the effect that he and six others had perjured themselves at the trial. The prosecution witnesses, he claimed, had been coached, and some of them were rewarded with plots of land at the Coast. He had himself been offered a university course in public administration at Exeter University, protection for his family, and a government job on his return from the UK The affidavit was backed by a letter, apparently from the Attorney-General at the time of the trial, detailing the promised benefits.

So it transpired that the convictions had been obtained by a trial at which it was conceded by the government that the witnesses had been coached (to better enable them to stand up to hostile cross-examination), that they had been paid (as compensation for loss of livelihood), and that Macharia had both lied at the trial and received benefits.

Macharia was later to write a book: The Truth about the Trial of Jomo Kenyatta.

== Personal life ==
Macharia was married to Edith Mwihaki, who died in 1999. His home village was Muthurumbi in Thika District, near Gatundu town. His home was located only five kilometres from Kenyatta's home.

Macharia died after being hit by a motorcyclist while crossing Thika Road on 5 December 2008.

== Bibliography ==
- Anonymous (16 March 1959) The Roots of the Fig Tree , Time Magazine.
- John Lonsdale (2000) "Kenyatta's Trials: Making and Breaking an African Nationalist", in The Moral World of the Law, Peter Coss (ed), Cambridge University Press. ISBN 0-521-64059-8
- Rawson Macharia (1991), The Truth about the Trial of Jomo Kenyatta, Nairobi: Longman. ISBN 9966-49-823-0
- Oliver Musembi (2008). Man who gave false testimony against Kenyatta dies in crash. Daily Nation, 9. xii. 08.
