= Siaya County =

Coordinates: 0°05′S 34°15′E

Siaya County Siaya
- County
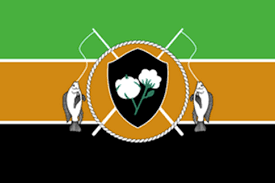
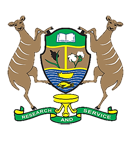
- Flag Coat of arms

- Location in Kenya
- Country: Kenya
- Formed: 4 March 2013
- Capital: Siaya

Government
  - Governor: James Orengo

Area
  - Total: 2,496.1 km^{2} (963.7 sq mi)

Population (2019)
  - Total: 993,183
  - Density: 397.89/km^{2} (1,030.5/sq mi)
- Time zone: UTC+3 (EAT)
- Website: siaya.go.ke

Siaya County is one of the counties in the former Nyanza Province in western Kenya. It is bordered by Busia County to the north, Kakamega County, and Vihiga County to the northeast and Kisumu County to the southeast. It shares a water border with Homa Bay County which is located south of Siaya County. The total area of the county is approximately 2,496.1 km^{2}. The county lies between latitude 0° 26' to 0° 18' north and longitude 33° 58' and 34° 33' east. Siaya has been split up into six new districts (sub-counties). Under the 2010 Constitution, the role of the districts is still unclear as much of the administrative authority was transferred to the county. The capital is Siaya, town, although the largest town is Bondo.

== Demographics ==
The population in the year 2019 was 993,183.

Administrative divisions
Division	Population*	Urban pop.*	Area	Sub-locations	Headquarters
Boro	47,455	0	180.1 km^{2}	12	Boro
Karemo	76,986	12,611	235.1 km^{2}	17	Siaya
Ugunja	77,006	3,382	198.8 km^{2}	21	Ugunja
Ukwala	98,912	487	319.5 km^{2}	28	Ukwala
Uranga	41,564	0	183.4 km^{2}	13	
Wagai	54,438	0	193.3 km^{2}	18	
Yala	83,823	2,165	209.8 km^{2}	19	Yala
Ndori	67,543	4,532	432.6 km^{2}	2	Ndori
Total	480,184	18,645	1,520 km^{2}	128	-
* 1999 census. Sources: ,, also added from District Commissioner's Office, Siaya 2001

=== Religion ===
Religion in Siaya County

Religion (2019 Census)	Number
Catholicism	226,455
Christians (Evangelical Protestants)	450,510
African Diviners	236,416
Orthodox	7,426
Other Christians	34,443
Islam	4,994
Hindu	25
Witchcraft	2,526
Other	16,993
No Religion	8,614
Don't Know	107
Not Stated	233

== Government ==
In the 2007 elections the county, then district, had five constituencies: Alego Constituency, Gem Constituency, Rarieda Constituency, Bondo Constituency and Ugenya Constituency.

As of 2013, the county was made up of six constituencies namely Alego Usonga, Bondo, Gem, Rarieda, Ugenya, and Ugunja.

=== Elections ===
At the 2007 parliamentary elections all five seats were won by Orange Democratic Movement.

Governors

Elections	Governor	Party	Notes
2013	Cornel Amoth Rasanga	ODM	High Court in Kisumu nullified the election on 23 August 2013.
—	George Okode	—	County Assembly Speaker elevated to acting governor on 3 September 2013.

== Economics ==
The county is part of the Lake Region Economic Bloc (LREB) established in 2018 to foster regional economic, industrial, social, and technological collaboration.

== Villages and settlements ==
- Lwak, a key village in Asembo, Rarieda constituency. Notably settled by prominent ancient elders whose impact transcends across generations till date. Some include: Mzee Johnson Charles Ogada Ogolla (popularly known as Ogada Mong’ith), a Christian philanthropist from Asembo Kanyikela Clan who after attending college at Siriba College (now Maseno University), he served as a senior official in prisons during Kenya’s post-colonial period (equivalent to modern day Chief Inspector Police). The son of Ogola K’Andang’o and Ojalo NyaKathomo, Mzee Ogada was the first author of the first Luo-English dictionary which was allegedly stolen by a Dutch man and later published in the Netherlands. Mzee Charles was also a secret confidant of Jaramogi Oginga Odinga, who often turned to him to organize secret underground railroad systems of hiding his son Raila Amollo Odinga and Raila’s sister Akinyi Odinga whenever they were pursued by the government of the day during Moi’s regime. He was also known to be a great mentor and close Uncle to the former Member of Parliament for Rarieda and Gubernatorial Contestant for Siaya County, Nicholas Gumbo and the Cabinet Secretary for ICT Mr. Eliud Owalo. Mzee Charles prominently championed the sponsoring of the education of many unrecorded numbers of students, a role which saw him serve as the Chairman of the Board of innumerable High Schools such as Siger in his lifetime. He was a staunch Christian who, together with his family also played a key role in standing with Mzee Mariko Tindi in the setting up of St. Marks Anglican Church in Mahaya; Second among many is Mzee Oracha Rambo, a friend of Mzee Andang’o (great-grandfather of Mzee Charles Ogada). Mzee Oracha Rambo is the man who donated his land for the establishment of the now Lwak institutions (Catholic Church, St. Mary’s Lwak High, Lwak Girls Primary, Lwak Mixed, Lwak Convent, Lwak Hospital).
- Migowa, a small village in Katweng'a, Uyoma, Rarieda Constituency.
- Tieng’a, a village in Uyoma, Rarieda Constituency where the freedom fighter and a member of Kapenguria Six, Achieng Oneko was born. He also served as the second Member of Parliament of Rarieda Constituency.
- Ujwang'a, a village in Siaya sub-location North East Ugenya location East Ugenya Ward of Siaya County
- Anyieka
- Ndori, a prominent roadside market located in Asembo and acts as a gateway connecting Asembo, Gem, Bondo, and Sakwa.
- Oyude, a small sleepy market serving villages in Oyude/Asembo along the Ndori-Owimbi road, Rarieda Constituency. Oyude is predominantly occupied by the K’Ochieng Clan.
- Kamito, an undeniably pronounced maritime village located by the Bay of Asembo. Mostly supports fishing activities, Asembo Bay, Rarieda Constituency.
- Nyabera, a village in South Central sub-location, Obambo location, Boro division, Alego Usonga Constituency.
- Aram, a major market and a key trading vortex weaving together the surrounding villages of the peoples of Asembo and Uyoma, both in Rarieda Constituency.
- Nyayiera, a village in Central Asembo location, Rarieda Constituency, Siaya County.
- Masiro, a sparsely populated village in Ugenya Constituency, Masiro endured several challenges including impassably horrible road network, and lack of electricity.
- Nyamninia, a village in Yala division, Siaya County
- Nyang'oma Kogelo, a village in Karemo Division, Siaya County
- Bondo Kolalo, a village in Sihay Division, Ugenya sub county, Siaya County
- Karadolo
- Sidindi, a village in Ugunja Constituency, Siaya County.
- Sigul, a village in Sihay Division, Ugenya sub county, Siaya County.
- Nyagondo, a village in Wagai Division, Gem Sub-County.
- Lihanda, a village in East Gem Ward, Siaya County.
- Naya, a village in South Uyoma ward, Madiany division, Rarieda Sub-County, Siaya County
- Simerro, A village in Rangala Sub Location, Sidindi Ward, Ugunja Sub Sounty, Siaya County.
- Nyamila, A village in Nyamila Sub Location, North Alego Location, the birthplace of the late criminal lawyer Silvanus Melea Otieno and the late Reverend Elisha Otieno Wauna
- Kagilo is a village in Central Gem.
- Got Regea, where the first black Kenyan cabinet minister in the Colonial Period was born in 1913- Mr. Appolo Ohanga
- Ukalama, a village in Ugunja sub-county, Sigomere division, North Uholo location, Tingare East sub-location.
- Nyabenge, a village in Abom sublocation, North Sakwa location.
- Memba, a village in Asembo, Rarieda Constituency
- Kanyiner/Kanyinek, a village which houses Ugenya High School and can by accessed from Ligega on the Kisumu-Busia highway.
- Madiany, a village in Asembo, Rarieda Constituency.
- Maugo

== Ethnicity and notable people ==
Majority of the population consist of members of the Luo tribe.

Notable people of Siaya County Include:

1. Jaramogi Oginga Odinga
2. Achieng Oneko
3. S.M Otieno
4. Barack Obama Sr.
5. Nicholas Gumbo
6. William Odongo Omamo
7. Bethwell Ogot
8. Grace Ogot
9. Raphael Tuju
10. James Aggrey Orengo
11. George Owino
12. Raila Amollo Odinga
13. Oburu Odinga
14. Washington Jakoyo Midiwo
15. Asenath Bole Odaga
16. Eliud Owalo
17. Cornel Rasanga Amoth
18. David Wasawo
19. PLO Lumumba
20. Larry Madowo
21. Opiyo Wandayi
22. Prof Thomas Odhiambo

== Notable secondary schools ==
- St. Mary's School, Yala, boys boarding school, Gem Constituency.
- Maranda High School, boys national school, Bondo Constituency.
- Chianda High School, boys boarding school, Rarieda Constituency.
- Ramba School, boys boarding school, Rarieda Constituency.
- St. Joseph's Nyalula Mixed secondary school, a day school, South Central Ward, Alego Usonga constituency
- St. Paul Obambo Mixed Secondary School is one of the county's mixed public day school which has dominated boys' volleyball and girls' netball trophies for more than a decade. Obambo is a Catholic sponsored school known for its discipline, academic excellence and extra curriculum performance.
- Ambira High School, boys boarding school, Siaya County
- Maliera Boys Secondary School, boarding school, along Busia-Kisumu Road near Kodiaga Market.
- Ng'iya Girls High School, girls national school, Alego Constituency.
- Boarding Boys High School, boarding school, Siaya county
- Simero Secondary School, mixed day secondary school located along Busia-Kisumu Road, Simero Village.
- Sawagongo High School, near Nyangweso Market, along the Kodiaga-Wagai Road.
- Lwak Girls' High School, girls boarding school, Rarieda Constituency
- Kapiyo Secondary School, mixed day, West Sakwa, Bondo Constituency.
- St Vincent Raliew Secondary School, mixed day/boarding school, Rarieda Constituency.
- Kitambo Mixed Secondary School, mixed day school, Rarieda Constituency.
- St. Christopher Palpal Secondary School mixed, Alego Usonga Constituency.
- St. Mary Ukwala Secondary School, boys boarding school, Ukwala Sub-County, Ugenya Constituency]
- Rang'ala Boys Secondary School, Ugunja Constituency, Ugunja Sub-county
- Rang'ala Girls' Secondary School, Ugunja Constituency, Ugunja Sub-county
- Ugenya High School, Ligega, Ugenya Constituency, Ugunja Sub-County
- Bar Olengo Secondary School, mixed school, Alego Constituency.
- Boro Secondary School, mixed school, Alego Constituency.
- Hawinga Girls Secondary School, Uranga town, Alego Constituency.
