= List of Kenyan freedom fighters =

A list of Kenyans who contributed to Kenya's struggle for liberation from colonial rule.

| Name | Born | Died | Additional Notes |
|---|---|---|---|
| Jaramogi Oginga Odinga | October 1911 | 20 January 1994 | Joryme Okoth was a Luo chieftain |
| Harry Thuku | 1895 | 1970 | Politician |
| James Beauttah | | | Led the Kikuyu Central Association, Kenya's first all-African political organization. With Joseph Kang'ethe and later Jomo Kenyatta in 1924. |
| Field Marshal Dedan Kimathi | 31 October 1920 | 18 February 1957 | Leader of the Kenya Land and Freedom Army and the Mau Mau Uprising |
| Martin Shikuku | 1933 | 22 August 2012 | Former Butere MP. |
| Paul Ngei | 18 October 1923 | 15 August 2004 | Politician who was imprisoned for his roles in the anti-colonial movement. He later held ministerial positions after independence. |
| Ronald Ngala | 1923 | 1972 | Politician who led the Kenya African Democratic Union political party from its creation in 1960 until its dissolution in 1964. |
| Tom Mboya | 15 August 1930 | 5 July 1969 | Trade unionist, educator, Pan Africanist, author, independence activist, cabinet minister, and a Founding father |
| Masinde Muliro | 1922 | 14 August 1992 | Politician and shaper of the political landscape of independent Kenya. |
| Achieng Oneko | 1920 | 9 June 2007 | Politician who was arrested for his part in the Mau Mau rebellion. He was elected for the Nakuru Town Constituency seat and appointed Minister for Information, Broadcasting and Tourism under Kenyatta. |
| John David Kali | 18 October 1924 | 7 July 1996 | Mau Mau freedom fighter detained at Kapenguria and Hola; survivor of the Hola massacre; first Government Chief Whip in independent Kenya. |
| Bildad Kaggia | 1922 | 7 March 2005 | Nationalist, activist and politician who established himself as a militant nationalist |
| Koitalel Arap Samoei | 1860 | 19 October 1905 | Orkoiyot, the supreme chief of the Nandi people of Kenya. He led the Nandi resistance. |
| Esau Khamati Oriedo | 1888 | 1 December 1992 | Trade unionist, philanthropist, legal scholar, and independence activist who was detained and tortured 1952 – 1957 at Kapenguria together Koinange wa Mbiyu (d.1960), Jomo Kenyatta, and others for his role in the anti-colonial movement. Provided legal advocacy to fellow Kenyans charged with political crimes during struggle for independence. a He was a stalwart advocate against impious xenophobic stance towards African cultural values by the colonial era Christian church. |
| Kungu Karumba | 1902 | Unknown | Nationalist and freedom-fighter who was a member of the Kapenguria Six. Karumba and five other men were arrested on October 20, 1952, due to their involvement with the Mau Mau. |
| Pio Gama Pinto | 31 March 1927 | 25 February 1965 | Journalist, politician and freedom fighter. He was a socialist leader and became independent Kenya's first martyr in 1965. |
| Field Marshal Musa Mwariama | 1928 | 1989 | Revolutionary leader of the Mau Mau in Meru and the highest-ranking Mau Mau leader who survived the war while avoiding capture. |
| Koinange Wa Mbiyu | 1865 | 1960 | Kikuyu Paramount chief who was imprisoned for his role in the Mau Mau movement in Kiambu. |
| Jomo Kenyatta | c. 1897 | 22 August 1978 | An anti-colonial activist and politician who was detained for his role in the anti-colonial movement. He governed Kenya as its Prime Minister from 1963 to 1964 and then as its first President from 1964 to his death in 1978. He was the country's first indigenous head of government and played a significant role in the transformation of Kenya from a colony of the British Empire into an independent republic. |
| W.W.W. Awori | 2 August 1925 | 5 May 1978 | Pioneer journalist, trade unionist, and one of the first African representatives nominated to the Legislative Council of Kenya (Legco). He served in the Legco from 1952 to 1956, advocating for African education, land ownership, and labour reforms. An early member of the Kenya African Union, W.W.W. Awori was the Acting President immediately before the organization was banned under Emergency regulations in 1953, and helped secure a legal team for the Kapenguria Six. |
| Makhan Singh | 27 December 1913 | 18 May 1973 | Sardar Makhan Singh was the first Trade Unionist and arguably played the most pivotal role in the Kenyan Freedom Movement. He disrupted the English trade and commerce activities and was titled "Maharaja Nairobi". |
