= Nicholas Gumbo =

Kenyan politician

Eng. Nicolas Gumbo WAJONYA is a Kenyan politician. He was the Member of Parliament (MP) for Rarieda Constituency from 2007 to 2017 where he broke the one term jinx and became one two Rarieda members of parliament to do so. His successor, Otiende Amolo has so far won two terms as MP. He served as Chairman Public Accounts Committee, Member House Broadcasting committee, Member Constituencies Fund committee and Member of Energy committee. He also served as Kenyatta National Hospital board chairman. He currently serves as the Chairperson of the Kenya Sugar Board. .

== Education ==
Gumbo attended Atemo Primary from 1972 to 1973, Lwak Mixed Primary School from 1974 to 1975, Orengo Primary School from 1975 to 1976 and Opapo Primary School in Kamagambo from 1977 to 1978. After earning the highest marks in CPE in the then Bondo District, he pursued his secondary education in Cardinal Otunga High School, Kisii from 1979 to 1984. He holds a first class honors in Bachelor of Science Degree (BSc) in Electrical and Electronics Engineering from The University of Nairobi class of 1989 and a Master’s in Business Administration (MBA) in Management Information Systems (MIS) from The University of Nairobi.

== Career ==
Gumbo joined Carl Bro International in 1989 as a graduate engineer where he was later promoted to an electrical design engineer until 1994 where he resigned to begin his career as a consulting engineer. Through this role he specialized in the design of electrical installations and energy audits for industrial, petroleum handling facilities, office buildings, hospitals, education institutions, banks, warehouses, factories and several other facilities.

He is also an active member of various professional societies in his field. Fellow, Institution of Engineers of Kenya. Engineers Board of Kenya-Registered Consulting Engineer. Professional Engineer (PE)- Engineers Board of Kenya. Member, Institution of Engineers of Kenya. Member of the Association of Consulting Engineers of Kenya. Corporate Member, Architectural Association of Kenya and member of the Institution of Engineering and Technology.

== Political Life ==
Gumbo was first elected to parliament in the 2007 General elections where he beat the incumbent Hon. Raphael Tuju. In 2013 he became the first member of Parliament to break the one term jinx in Rarieda Constituency when he got re-elected to parliament for his second term.

Eng. Gumbo became the chair of the public accounts committee beating ODM's preferred candidate John Mbadi. In his capacity as chairman of the parliamentary Public Accounts Committee (PAC), Gumbo was at the forefront of questioning cabinet secretary Anne Waiguru over corruption allegations in the ministry of devolution and planning in the National Youth Service Scandal. While serving his second term, he was ranked top MP in Nyanza and the 5th overall in the 2015 MP's approval rating by Infotrak Research. He was also ranked as one of parliament's top debators and as the second best performing chairman in Parliament by Mzalendo Trust when he served as the chairman Public Accounts Committee.

In 2015 before tabling the forensic report on the judiciary, Gumbo told the media that he had received death threats from unknown sources. He said that he got text messages saying that the death threats were aimed at him and his family. In the same year he said that he would run for the Siaya gubernatorial seat in 2017 to unseat the incumbent Cornel Rasanga. He took a second stab at the Siaya gubernatorial race in 2022 with the UDM party.
