= C. M. G. Argwings-Kodhek =

Kenyan politician

Hon. Clement Michael George Argwings-Kodhek

MP for Gem Constituency
- In office 1963–1969
- Succeeded by: Wasonga Sijeyo
- Constituency: Gem Constituency

Personal details
- Born: Clement Michael George Argwings-Kodhek; 26 October 1923 Nyawara, Nyanza Province (Western Kenya)
- Died: 29 January 1969 (aged 45) Nairobi, Kenya
- Citizenship: Kenya
- Party: Kenya African National Union (KANU)
- Children: 6
- Education: St. Mary's School, Yala, Makerere College, University of South Wales
- Cabinet: Jomo Kenyatta

Clement Michael George Argwings-Kodhek (26 October 1923 – 29 January 1969), also known as Chiedo Moa Gem Argwings-Kodhek, was a Kenyan attorney and politician. He served in the government and cabinet of Jomo Kenyatta, Kenya's first president, for six years, during which time he held the post of member of parliament for the Gem Constituency and the portfolios of Minister of Natural Resources and the Ministry of Foreign Affairs.

== Early life and education ==
A member of the Kagola Ojuodhi clan, Argwings-Kodhek was born in Nyawara, Nyanza Province. He was educated at St. Mary's School in Yala, and St. Mary's College in Kisubi, Uganda, where he sat for his Cambridge School Certificate in 1936. From 1937 until 1940 Argwings-Kodhek attended Makerere College, graduating from there with a teaching degree. After graduation, Argwings-Kodhek taught at Kapsabet Boys High School and in the Rift Valley.

In 1947, Argwings-Kodhek won a scholarship from the Kenyan colonial government to study in Great Britain. Though sent to study the social sciences, Argwings-Kodhek's interests lay with the law, and he lost his scholarship when he switched to that subject, forcing his family to sell their assets in order to finance his education. After graduating from University of South Wales, Argwings-Kodhek was called to the bar at Lincoln’s Inn, becoming the first East African to qualify as a barrister at the Inns of Court in London.

== Legal career ==
In 1952, Argwings-Kodhek returned to Kenya with his first wife, Mavis Tate. Though he was offered a position in the Department of the Attorney General, he rejected the low salary — which was a third of that of his white peers — and went instead into private practice. A close associate of several members of the Kenya African Union (KAU), Argwings-Kodhek began taking briefs for KAU members charged with participating in the Mau Mau rebellion. Soon he was in such high demand among accused Mau Mau participants that Kenya's white settler population called him 'the Mau Mau lawyer'.

Many of the defendants who sought Argwings-Kodhek's services lacked the means to pay his fees. As a result, Argwings-Kodhek took their cases as 'paupers' briefs,' the low fees for which usually only covered his costs. His status as colonial Kenya's only Black lawyer exposed him to repeated harassment by police officers, who regularly requested his documentation and occasionally inhibited his access to areas affected by the state of emergency declared by the British. This harassment culminated with his disbarment in 1957.

== Political career ==
Though national political parties were prohibited under the state of emergency proclaimed by the British, Argwings-Kodhek circumvented this ban in 1956 by establishing the Nairobi District African Congress. He was instrumental in the formation of the Kenya African National Union (KANU) in March 1960, and he won election to the colony's Legislative Council in the 1961 general election, serving on it until it replaced by the new Parliament of Kenya upon Kenya's independence in 1963.

In the 1963 Kenyan general election, Argwings-Kodhek won election to the country's new House of Representatives as the representative for Gem Constituency. Appointed by Prime Minister Jomo Kenyatta as Assistant Minister for Defence, Argwings-Kodhek served in that office until he was promoted in 1966 to head the Ministry of Natural Resources. In 1968, he was named Minister of State for Foreign Affairs, serving in that office until his death in a car accident in January 1969.

== Legacy ==
One of the main thoroughfares in western Nairobi, Argwings Kodhek Road, which begins in Upper Hill at Ralph Bunche Road and runs west to the Valley Arcade area, is named after Argwings-Kodhek.
