= Nyagondo =

- Location within Kenya
- Coordinates: 0°03′04″N 34°25′01″E
- Country: Kenya
- County: Siaya
- Division: Wagai
- Location: N.E. Gem
- Sub-Location: Wagai West
- Time zone: UTC+3 (EAT)

Nyagondo is a small market centre in Gem Constituency, Siaya County, in the Republic of Kenya. It is located along the Kisumu Siaya tarmac road, approximately 70 kilometres to the west of Kisumu town and 17 kilometres to the east of Siaya town. The people of Nyagondo are members of the Luo community and speak the Dholuo language.

Nyagondo is home to the Nyagondo Catholic parish, which sponsors the Nyagondo Primary School and Mixed Secondary Schools. Nyagondo is about 7 kilometer from apuoche market which borders River Yala on the way to the Akala market which is a border to other major places such as Seme, Asembo, and Bondo.

== Social background and set up ==
An interview with one elderly man revealed that men in the older generation married many wives. As such, clans and sub-clans have been named after these wives. For example, Thomo, who was a great-grandson of Gem, had many wives, namely Awidi, Achar, Aluoch, Awuor and Adhasi. The clans living around this area have thus been named after these wives and hence Kachar, Kaluoch, Kawidi, Kawuor and Kadhasi. Nyagondo is located within the Kadhasi sub-clan but serves as an economic hub for all the other sub-clans.

== Socio-economic activities ==
Peasant farming is the predominant economic activity with locals majoring in subsistence crop cultivation and domestic animal rearing. Popular crops grown include maize, beans, millet, cassavas, sweet potatoes, cow peas, tomatoes and kales. The animals kept include cattle, sheep and goats. Some farmers are also involved in small-scale cash crop farming, majoring in sugar cane, which supplies the local jaggeries in Luanda, Panyako and Uhembo.

Nyagondo recently benefited from the Rural Electrification Programme, which has helped to boost economic activity and living standards in the area. The area also has a health facility that is funded by the government, both directly and indirectly, from the LATF and CDF programmes.

The main economic challenge remains youth unemployment and poverty as most residents of Nyagondo, like many Kenyans, live on less than a dollar a day.

== Religious beliefs ==
The people of Nyagondo practice Christianity, a large number being Catholics, with many being Anglicans or adherents of other Christian denominations including Legio Maria, Roho and also Evangelical followers. Very few people practice traditional African religion.
