= Siaya District =

Former district in Kenya

Coordinates: 0°05′S 34°15′E

Siaya District was a district of Nyanza Province in the south western part of Kenya. It was bordered by Busia District to the North, Vihiga and Butere/Mumias Districts to the North-East, Bondo District to the South, and Kisumu District to the southeast. The total area of the district was approximately 1520 km^{2}.

In 1968, Central Nyanza District was split into Siaya and Kisumu districts. Between 1998 and 2009, Siaya district was divided into Siaya, Bondo and Rarieda districts. The districts had a combined population of 842,304 in the 2009 census.

In 2013, Siaya County was effected meaning all districts that were formed out of Siaya District after 1992 were reconsolidated.

As of 2007, the district had three constituencies:

- Alego Constituency
- Gem Constituency
- Ugenya Constituency
