= Ujwang'a =

- Village
- Location within Kenya
- Coordinates: 0°10′19.4″S 34°20′52.7″E
- County: Siaya County
- Constituency: Ugenya Constituency

Ujwang'a is a village in Ugenya Constituency, on the eastern side of Siaya County, Kenya near the shore of Lake Victoria. It has prominent sweet rice fields. The staple food of the village's inhabitants is maize; this is a rice dish and is mainly sold commercially, despite the village being the largest producer of locally consumed rice in Siaya County. Ujwang'a is home to Kevin Alori, Raphael Alori, Oscar Lorna, Eric Masiga, Benerd Ongore, and Johnmark Odongo Msiko, etc. The village has one private primary school (St. Paul's Digital Junior Academy); a hospital will open soon.
