= Larry Madowo =

Kenyan journalist (born 1987)

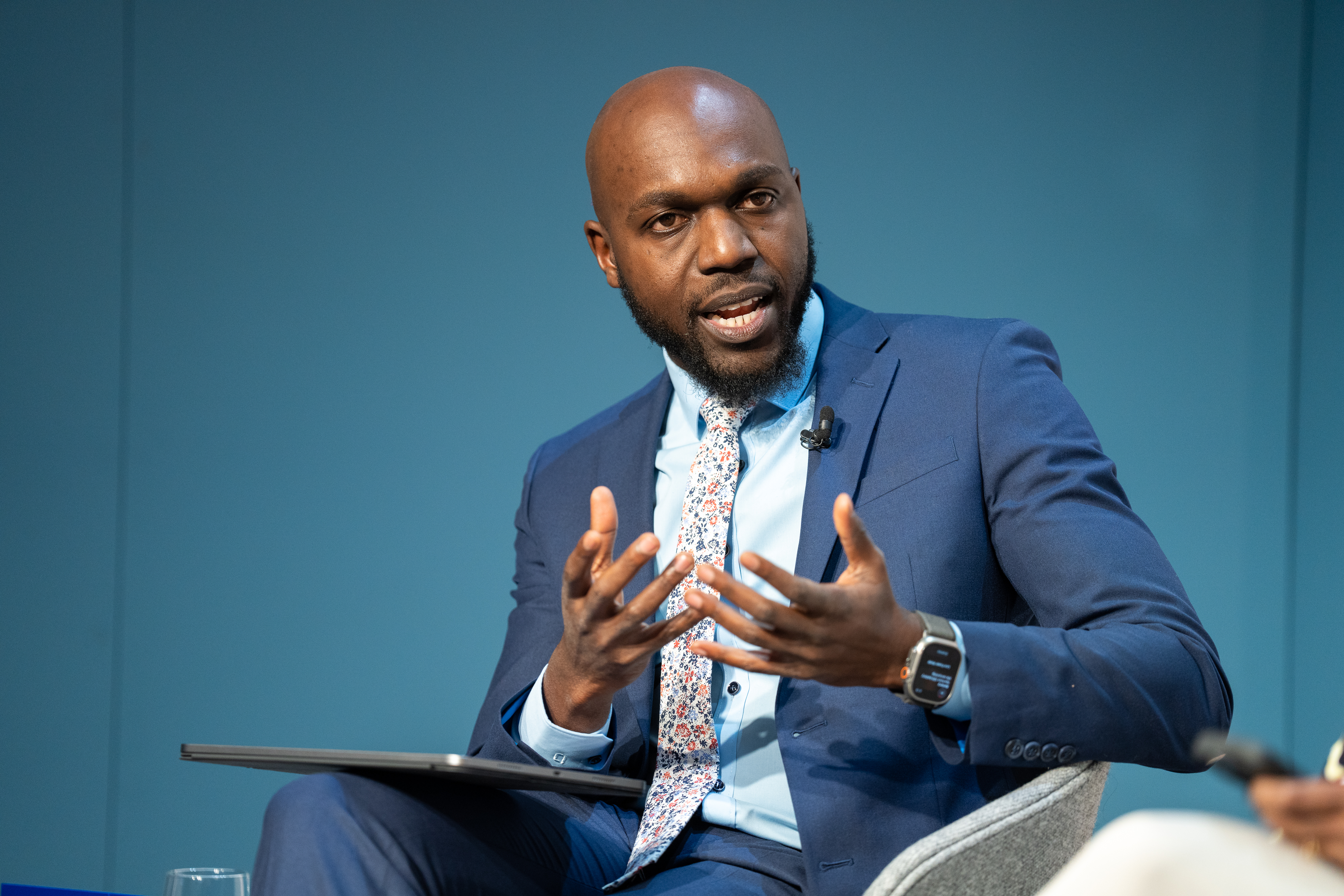
- Madowo in 2023
- Born: Larry Madowo; 14 July 1987 (age 39); Siaya, Kenya
- Education: Columbia University (MA)
- Occupation: Journalist
- Employer: CNN
- Known for: Journalism
- Website: www.larrymadowo.co.ke

Larry Madowo (born 14 July 1987) is a journalist, a CNN international correspondent and host of the African Voices Changemakers and Playmakers series. He was previously a North America correspondent for the BBC, anchored breaking news and presented BBC World News America from Washington, DC. He was a 2019–20 Knight-Bagehot Fellow in Economics and Business Journalism at Columbia University in New York and the BBC Africa Business Editor until 2019.

Madowo started his career in Nairobi as a trainee reporter at KTN and then as a business anchor at NTV Kenya where he worked twice, he later anchored and reported business and financial news at CNBC Africa before returning to NTV. He resigned from the station in March 2018 to join the BBC. He hosted The Larry Madowo Show on Nation FM from August 2014 until June 2016 and wrote a weekly column in the Daily Nation every week named #FrontRow from 5 August 2014 until 8 February 2018. In Kenya, he is best known for hosting a popular Friday night show called #TheTrend on NTV Kenya from December 2012 until 30 June 2017.

== Early life ==
Madowo grew up in various parts of Kenya, including Siaya, Kisumu and Nairobi. He attended Usingo and Karapul primary schools and St Gabriel's Seminary for secondary education. He had intended to train as a catholic priest, but by the time he finished high school this had changed. In college, he studied broadcast journalism. He attended Daystar University in Kenya.

== Journalism career ==
In 2006, Madowo enrolled for a Communication degree at Daystar University in Nairobi. In 2007, Madowo interned for a vernacular radio station Bahasha FM reading news in English. Madowo eventually dropped out of college a year and a half down his degree to take up a job at Kenya Television Network (KTN), one of Africa's oldest private television networks. He became one of the household names in Kenya and after three years, he left KTN for NTV, where he was a business anchor and reporter. In May 2012, he joined the South African-based CNBC Africa as one of the main anchors of market day shows Open Exchange, Power Lunch and Closing Bell. His stay at CNBC Africa only lasted eight months and in December 2012, he went back to NTV as the technology editor and news anchor. Madowo returned to college and graduated with a Bachelor of Arts in Communication degree from Daystar University in June 2014.

During his second tenure at NTV Kenya, he also freelanced for various global news outlets including CNN International, France 24 English, the BBC, and Public Radio International. When the Kenyan newspaper the Daily Nation declined to publish a column critical of the Kenyan government's shutdown of four major private TV stations in early 2018 during political tension, the opinion piece was published on the CNN website. He terminated his column and became a Contributing Columnist for the Washington Post's Global Opinions page.

On 11 April 2018, it was announced that Madowo was joining BBC News Africa as Business Editor. He led a team of business journalists based in Nairobi, London, Lagos, Dakar and Johannesburg. He has appeared across BBC World TV, BBC World Service Radio, BBC News channel in the UK, bbc.com and BBC Radio 4 as a reporter or commentator on African business.

A radio documentary Madowo presented on the Chinese-built railway in Kenya won the Daily Journalism (Single Report) category at the 2019 Association of International Broadcasting Awards on 6 November 2019 in London. Raha: The Joy of the Train was part of a series produced by Peter Shevlin of British production company BlokMedia.

On 9 April 2019, he was named among the 2019–2020 Knight-Bagehot Fellows at Columbia University. On 29 July 2019, Madowo said he was taking a sabbatical from the BBC for his fellowship at Columbia Journalism School. Madowo graduated from Columbia with a Master of Arts in Business and Economics Journalism on 20 May 2020. His master's thesis on African e-commerce pioneer Jumia's tumultuous first year on the New York Stock Exchange won the Philip Greer Scholarship Award for Financial Writing.

He briefly contributed to the Guardian US and the BBC.

Madowo marked his return to the BBC in a new role as a North America Correspondent in the summer of 2020 with a report from a Coronavirus Unit in Houston, Texas. He reported across the United States primarily for BBC World News and the BBC World Service. He has filed reports from North Dakota, Georgia, Kentucky, New York, Louisiana, as well as South and North Carolina, among others. His coverage of the 2020 US election and inauguration of Joe Biden has been recognised around the world.

He has interviewed some of the world's most prominent people including presidents, world-famous artists, global CEOs and Sophia the Robot.

Madowo was selected as a Young Global Leader by the World Economic Forum in March 2020. He was nominated as a One Young World Journalist of the Year in June 2020. He has twice been named among the 100 Most Influential Africans by New African magazine. Madowo was again cited as one of the Top 100 most influential Africans by New African magazine in 2020.

He became the first black person to deliver the Peter Stursberg Foreign Correspondents Lecture at Canada's Carleton University in December 2020. He has also referenced his work as a foreign correspondent in the United States in interviews by The New Yorker and NPR.

In May 2021, Madowo was appointed as CNN's Nairobi correspondent. See Also Azeezah Hashim. Two months later, in July 2021, CNN promoted him to international correspondent.

== Views ==
Madowo self-identifies as a Christian, although he is quoted as saying that there is probably no God, suggesting that he holds agnostic views. He is critical of the religious in Kenya, having written in his old Daily Nation column "Atheists don't harm anyone, let them be!" that they exhibit the affliction of the inability to hold divergent views. This had come as a response to the outrage by religious Kenyans after the group, Atheists in Kenya, attempted to register themselves as an organization.

He has spoken out about racism while writing about his experience as a black man in the United States.

Madowo became a vocal defender of press freedom in Africa after a run-in with the Kenyan government in 2018 forced him to seek shelter in a safe house. Alongside two other colleagues, they regained their freedom after a court granted them anticipatory bail. He has said that many other African journalists face greater dangers from their government, including threats to their lives.

== Personal life ==
Madowo is active on social media and has a combined following of over four million people across Facebook, Twitter and Instagram. He was ranked as the most influential Kenyan on Linkedln as at January 2026.

Madowo is also a moderator and speaker at media, technology and business conferences around the world.
