= Central Nyanza District =

Former administrative district in Kenya

Coordinates: 0°05′S 34°46′E

Central Nyanza was an administrative district of Nyanza Province in western Kenya. It was headquartered in Kisumu. Created as Kisumu District in 1902, after the eastern region of Uganda was transferred to the East Africa Protectorate. At the time the district was under Kisumu Province, later renamed Nyanza Province in 1909. There were boundary alterations between 1920 and 1921, leading to the district being renamed Central Kavirondo. In 1948, Central Kavirondo was renamed Central Nyanza.

The district was one of the forty districts recognised in the independence Constitution of Kenya. The district returned one member of Parliament to the Senate of Kenya until the senate was abolished in 1966, when the district became purely administrative.

In 1968, Central Nyanza District, split into Kisumu and Siaya districts. The now defunct Central Nyanza District covers the present-day Kisumu and Siaya counties.
