= Veronica Namaganda Nanyondo =

Ugandan politician

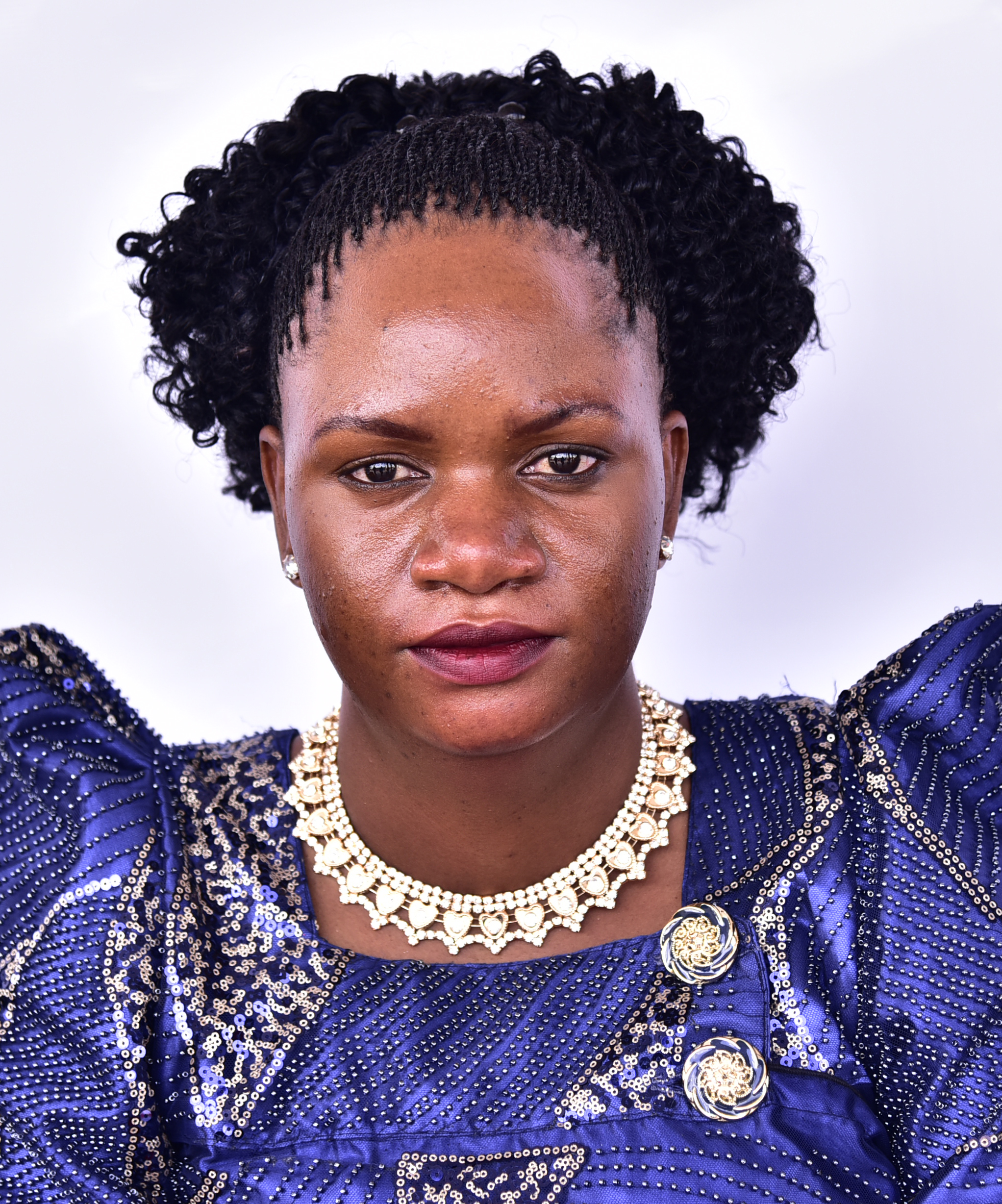
- Born: 22 July 1986 (age 39)
- Citizenship: Uganda
- Education: Kisojjo Primary School; Mende Kalema Memorial S.S; St. Andrew Kagwa S.S; Makerere University
- Occupation: Politician
- Years active: December 2015 to date
- Employer(s): Unique Business Systems; St. John S.S Mukono; Ver Stationaries Limited; Parliament of Uganda
- Known for: Politics
- Title: Member of Parliament
- Political party: National Unity Platform (NUP)
- Other political affiliations: Democratic Party(DP)
- Relatives: Suzan Namaganda; Fred Mukasa Mbidde

Veronica Namaganda Nanyondo (born 22 July 1986) is a Ugandan politician who represents Bukomansimbi District. She belongs to National Unity Platform (NUP). Inspired by her sister Suzan Namaganda, who died in a car accident, Nanyondo started her political career in December 2015 on the Democratic Party (DP) platform. Nanyondo is currently a woman MP for Bukomansimbi district who garnered 23,815 votes that made her a victor. She was interested in contesting for the position of Women MP because she wanted to build on what her late sister had started and thought that she was the right person to replace her.

== Education ==
Nanyondo attained her Primary Leaving Examinations in 1998 at Kisojjo Primary School. She went ahead and attained Uganda Certificate of Education in 2002 at Mende Kalema Memorial S.S. She did not stop their, she went ahead to attain the Uganda Advanced Certificate of Education in 2004 at St. Andrew Kagwa S.S and lastly she attained the Bachelor of Arts in Education at Makerere University.

== Work experience ==
Nanyondo started her career in 2010 where she worked as she worked as a Sales and Marketing Executive in Unique Business Systems up to 2011. From 2011 to 2013 as a teacher at St. John S.S Mukono and she is currently working as a director in Ver Stationaries Limited . During the recent elections, She organized a joint rally with other NUP candidates where they received defectors from the ruling National Resistance Movement (NRM) party where they notified Police of their meeting and received clearance.

== Family background. ==
Nanyondo is a sister in-law to Fred Mukasa Mbidde who is a representative in the East African Legislative Assembly(EALA) representative. Nanyondo is therefore a sister to the Late Suzan Namaganda who was Mukasa Mbidde's wife.

== Hobbies. ==
- Following current affairs.
- Research.
- Praising God.

=== Special interests. ===
- Helping the needy, orphans and widows.
- Doing charity work.
- Advocating for human rights.
