= Maugo =

Settlement in Kenya

Maugo is a small village in Ugenya Constituency, in Western side of Siaya County in Nyanza Province in the Republic of Kenya. The name Maugo means Tsetse fly in Dholuo (the native language of the local Luo people). The area was a fertile breeding ground for tsetse flies in the past and these can still be spotted in Maugo.

There is one primary school (Bar Atheng Primary school), One church (St, Gabriel Catholic church- under The holy trinity Rang'ala (parish) catholic Church. The area is well-linked to the electricity grid and road network connecting it to Busia-Kisumu Highway to the East and Ugunja-Butere Highway to the West. It is located in the East Uholo Location in Ugunja division of Siaya County.

One of the most notable residents of Maugo is Mzee Odiaga, a World war II veteran.
