= Madiany =

- Location within Kenya
- Coordinates: 0.28°S 34.32°E
- Country: Kenya
- Province: Nyanza Province
- Time zone: UTC+3 (EAT)

Madiany is a settlement in Kenya's Nyanza Province.

Madiany is the headquarter of the current Rarieda Sub-County in Siaya County. Madiany has several amenities including the Madiany Sub County Hospital, schools, churches and banks. It's centrally located in Uyoma and is a gateway to Luanda Kotieno modern beach. One can cross to South Nyanza through the Luanda Kotieno-Mbita modern ferry services. Recently Dr. Otiende Amolo, the current Member of Parliament for Rarieda Constituency facilitated the construction and opening of Madiany Law Court. This court is expected to serve the entire population of Rarieda, parts of Bondo, Alego, Ugenya, and Gem. It is expected to greatly decongestant Bondo Law Court.

With construction of Gagra-Madiany-Digwa road, Madiany town is expected to grow exponentially. The town is also expected to hold factories such as cotton factory, and fish processing factories.

The town enjoys high security as the Deputy County Commissioner operates from the town. It also has a police post.

Madiany town holds several schools, social amenities and churches. Notable schools include St. Sylvester's Madiany Girls within the town. Other notable nearby schools include Ndigwa school, Lwak Girls and Ramba boys. It has several churches including the Seventh Day Adventist Church Madiay and Langi. Other churches include St. Sylvester catholic church, Chrisco, Roho, Nomiya among others.

plans are underway and actually in advanced stage to build higher learning and tertiary institutions in or around Madiany. Such include, Madiany Kenya Medical Training College (at Masala), Nyakongo College, Mahata TTI, among others.

Madiany town is just few kilometers form other major surrounding towns such Bondo town, Luanda Kotieno, Rangengni, Aram, Ndori and Asembo Bay. It's only one hour drive form Kisumu city, the largest city in the East African Community Lake Victoria Basin.
