= Kangundo Constituency =

Kenyan electoral constituency

Kangundo
- constituency for the Parliament of Kenya
- Kangundo Constituency within Machakos County

- Machakos County within Kenya
- County: Machakos
- Population: 97,917
- Area: 173 km^{2} (66.8 sq mi)

Current constituency
- Number of members: 1
- Party: GDDP
- Member of Parliament: Fabian Kyule Mule
- Wards: 4

Kangundo Constituency is an electoral constituency in Kenya. It is one of eight constituencies in Machakos County. The constituency has six wards, all electing councillors for the Kangundo town council.

The constituency was established for the 1969 elections.

== Members of Parliament ==
Elections	MP	Party	Notes
1969	Paul Ngei	KANU	One-party system
1974	Paul Ngei	KANU	One-party system
1979	Paul Ngei	KANU	One-party system
1983	Paul Ngei	KANU	One-party system.
1988	Paul Ngei	KANU	One-party system.
1990	Joseph Kimeu Ngutu	KANU	By-elections, One-party system.
1992	Joseph Wambua Mulusya	DP	
1997	Joseph Kimeu Ngutu	KANU	
2002	Moffat Muia Maitha	Sisi kwa Sisi	
2007	Johnson Nduya Muthama	ODM-Kenya	
2013	Kyengo Katatha Maweu	Wiper Democratic Movement (Kenya)	
2017	Fabian Kyule Muli	Muungano Party	

== Locations and wards ==
Locations
Location	Population
Kakuyuni	19,098
Kalandini	10,294
Kangundo	34,565
Kanzalu	22,334
Kawathei	19,035
Kivaani	15,961
Koma Rock	9,505
Kyanzavi	23,417
Kyeleni	13,402
Matungulu	24,028
Nguluni	13,460
Tala	27,220
Total	x

Wards
Ward	Registered Voters
Kangundo East	10,009
Kangundo North	21,800
Kangundo West	11,124
Matungulu East	21,118
Matungulu North	12,780
Matungulu West	13,345
Total	90,176
*September 2005.
