= Maliera Boys Secondary School =

School in Kenya

Maliera Boys Secondary School is a secondary school in Kodiaga, Siaya County, Gem sub-county, Kenya. Its located along Kisumu- Busia highway.
