= Asenath Bole Odaga =

Kenyan publisher and author (1938–2014)

- Born: 5 July 1938; Rarieda, Kenya
- Died: 1 December 2014 (aged 77); Kisumu, Kenya
- Education: Alliance Girls High School; University of Nairobi
- Occupations: Author, publisher
- Parent(s): Blasto Akumu Aum and Patricia Abuya Abok
- Website: www.asenathboleodaga.com/her-story

Asenath Bole Odaga (5 July 1938 – 1 December 2014) was a Kenyan publisher and author of novels, plays, children's books, and other literary works. Odaga also promoted literature in Kenyan languages and the study of oral literature by writing in Luo and co-authoring a guide to oral literature for students.

== Biography ==
Born in Rarieda, Kenya, on 5 July 1938, Asenath Bole Odaga was educated at Alliance Girls High School and the University of Nairobi. At the University of Nairobi, Odaga submitted a thesis for the Master of Arts degree: Educational Values of "Sigendeni Luo": The Kenya Luo Oral Narratives.

In 1982, Odaga founded Lake Publishers, becoming the first female publisher in Kenya. She would later open the Thu-Thinda bookstore in Kisumu. She founded the Kenya Women Literature Group in 1986, with the intention of developing works in Kenyan languages by and for women.

Odaga also wrote books for children, saying: "I thought that children should have something to read about their own background and the other children they know, real African heroes with whom they can identify". These stories often focus on the daily life of children.

Asenath Bole Odaga died in Kisumu on 1 December 2014.

=== Legacy ===
Odaga was listed by the Daily Nation as one of the writers having the most impact on Kenyan society. Her work has been cited as an influence on Kenyan novelist Yvonne Adhiambo Owuor.

== Published works ==
- English—Dholuo Dictionary
- The Villager's Son (1971)
- Thu tinda : stories from Kenya (1980)
- Yesterday's today: a study of oral literature (1984)
- Ogilo nungo piny kirom (1983)
- The Shade Changes (1984)
- Nyamgondho wuod ombare gi sigendini luo moko (1985)
- The Storm (1985)
- Literature for children and young people in Kenya (1985)
- Munde goes to the market (1987), with Adrienne Moore
- A bridge in time (1987)
- Munde and his friends (1987)
- Between the years (1987)
- Jande's ambition (1988)
- The silver cup (1988)
- The hare's blanket. And other stories (1989), with Adrienne Moore
- Poko nyar migumba: gi sigend luo mamoko (1989), with
- The diamond ring (1989)
- The angry flames (1989), with Adrienne Moore
- The secret of the monkey rock (1989)
- Riana (1991)
- A night on a tree (1991)
- My home (1991)
- The love ash, rosa and other stories (1992)
- Simbi nyaima (1993)
- Basic English-Luo words and phrases (1993)
- Why the hyena has a crooked neck and other stories (1993)
- Endless road (1995)
- Luo sayings (1995)
- Something for nothing (2001)
- Mogen jabare (2003)
- Nyangi gi Otis (2004)
- The Luo oral literature and educational values of its narratives (2010)
