= Fabian Kyule Muli =

Kenyan politician

MP for Kangundo Constituency in Parliament of Kenya
- In office 2017–Present

Party leader of Grand Dream Development Party
- In office 2018–Present

Personal details
- Born: Machakos, Kenya
- Party: Grand Dream Development Party
- Education: Jomo Kenyatta University; University of London
- Occupation: Politician
- Known for: Leadership, Politics

Fabian Kyule Muli is a Kenyan politician and businessman currently serving as the member of Parliament for Kangundo Constituency since 2017. He is also the party leader of the Grand Dream Development Party. Before joining politics, Muli worked in the United States Army and later ventured into business.

== Education ==
Muli studied St Martin Primary School for primary education and Kabaa High school for secondary education in Machakos county. Muli pursued higher education at Jomo Kenyatta University, where he obtained a Bachelor of Laws degree. He later earned a Master of Laws from the University of London.

== Career ==
After high school, Muli served as a logistics officer in the United States Army, where he was assigned to missions in Iraq and Afghanistan. After his military service, he ventured into business and founded Forbes Global Kenya, a company specializing in labor export to the Middle East. He is also the director of Global Track Security Limited, a firm involved in security services.

== Political career ==
Muli has been elected as the member of Parliament for Kangundo Constituency consecutively in 2017 and 2022 and has been active in parliamentary debates. He has put forward several initiatives, including a 2023 proposal to utilize the Kenya Defence Forces for pumping water from Lake Victoria and the Indian Ocean to address drought challenges in Kenya.

Since 2018, Muli serves as the party leader of the Grand Dream Development Party, advocating for policies aimed at economic empowerment and national development.

== Disputes ==
Muli, representing Kenya Association of Private Employment Agencies (KAPEA), challenged the Kenya Ministry of Labour over the suspension of accreditation licenses for private recruitment firms. The Employment and Labour Relations Court ruled against his request to stop government interference but ordered the police to return confiscated passports to their rightful owners.
