= James Orengo =

Kenyan lawyer and human rights activist

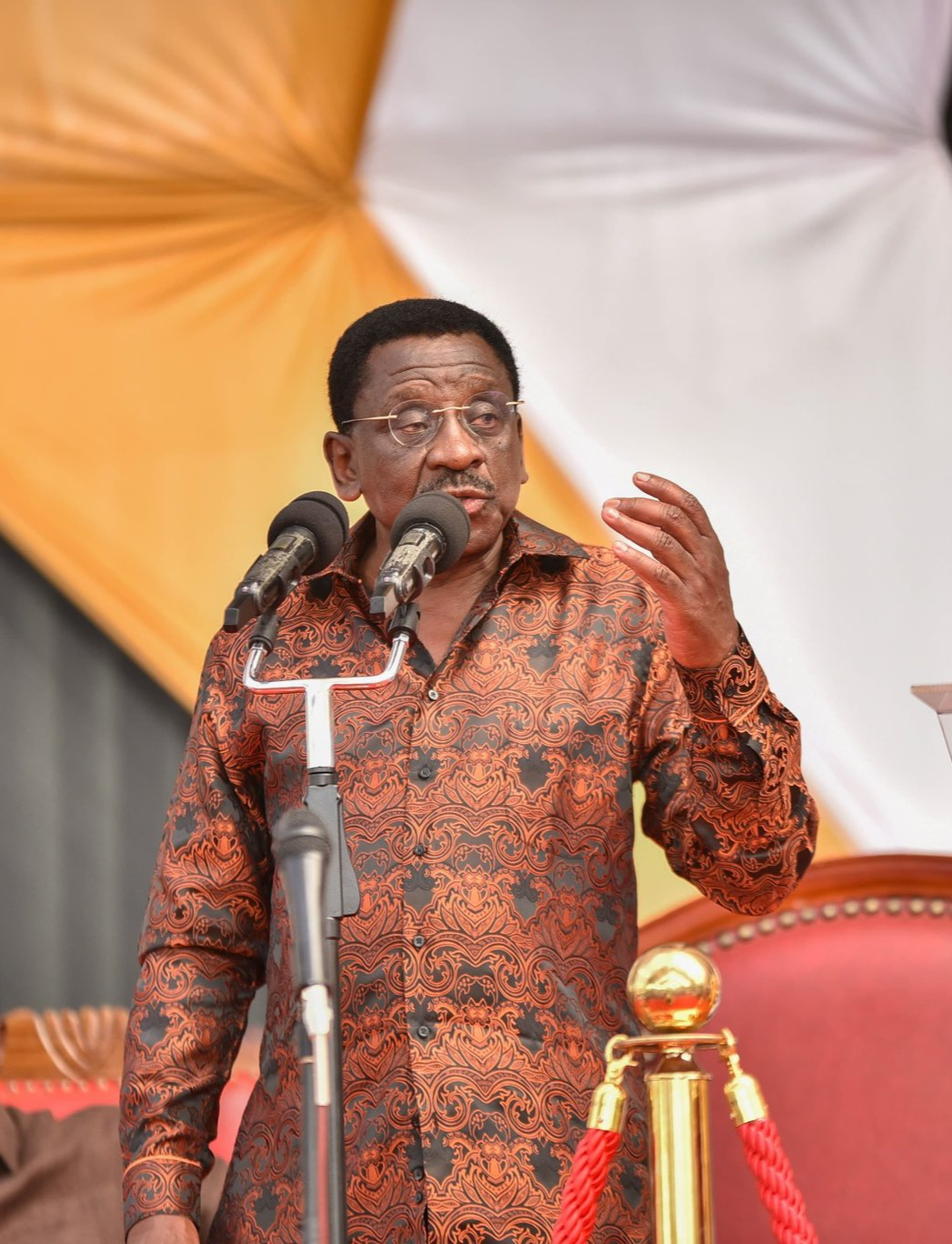
- Orengo in 2024

Governor of Siaya County
- Incumbent
- Assumed office 25 August 2022
- Preceded by: Cornel Rasanga

Minority Leader of the Senate of Kenya
- In office 15 March 2018 – 9 August 2022
- Preceded by: Moses Wetangula
- Succeeded by: Stewart Madzayo

Senator of Siaya County
- In office 28 March 2013 – 25 August 2022
- Preceded by: Post created
- Succeeded by: Oburu Odinga

Minister for Lands
- In office 2008–2013
- President: Mwai Kibaki

Member of the Kenyan Parliament
- In office 15 January 2008 – 28 March 2013
- Preceded by: Stephen Ondiek
- Succeeded by: David Ochieng Ouma
- Constituency: Ugenya

Member of the Kenyan Parliament
- In office 26 January 1993 – 2003
- Preceded by: Stephen Ondiek
- Succeeded by: Stephen Ondiek
- Constituency: Ugenya
- In office 1980–1983
- Preceded by: Matthews Joseph Ogutu
- Succeeded by: Stephen Ondiek
- Constituency: Ugenya

Personal details
- Born: February 22, 1951 (age 75) Kenya Colony
- Party: ODM, SDP
- Spouse: Betty Murungi
- Children: 6
- Education: University of Nairobi (LLB); Kenya School of Law
- Profession: Lawyer

James Aggrey Bob Orengo is a Kenyan lawyer, human rights activist, and politician who is the current governor for Siaya County. He is also one of the few Kenyan lawyers who have attained the professional grade of Senior counsel in the legal field, a title that he earned during the Kibaki administration.

Orengo was elected as an MP for the Ugenya Constituency on a KANU ticket in a by-election in 1980, making him the youngest MP in Kenya at the time, at age 29. He was elected as a member of parliament for Ugenya constituency in 1992 and served up to 1997, re-elected in 1997, and served until 2002. In 2002, he vied for the presidency and lost. In 2005, he joined the Orange Democratic Movement party, teaming up with Raila Odinga after a significant standoff between the two following a fallout from 2002. In 2007, he vied for the position of Ugenya MP, which he won, enabling him to serve in that capacity until 2013. He was appointed as a Minister of Lands from 2008 to 2013. He was elected and served in the Senate of Kenya from 2013 to 2017 as senator for Siaya County.

In 2022 he vied for the governor of Siaya County and won. He holds the gubernatorial seat to date. He is still governor.

== Early life and education ==
He was born as James Aggrey Bob Orengo on 22 February 1951 in Kasipul Kabondo in Homabay County, Kenya, to Apolo Stefano Olunga Orengo, a senior police chief and Josfina Atieno Olunga Orengo. In 1954, he started attending Ambira Primary School, where he finished his primary education in 1964. He joined the Alliance High School in January 1965 and finished form six education in 1970. In 1971, he joined the University of Nairobi to study law and became the university president in 1973. In 1974, he graduated from the University of Nairobi with pass in Bachelor of Laws (LL.B.) and later enrolled at the prestigious Kenya School of Law. He passed his bar examination after several attempts and was thus admitted into the Kenya legal Council.

== Career ==
=== Activism ===
Orengo has been known as a political activist since his days as a student leader at the university. He led fellow students in many protests fighting against issues that he felt needed changing both at the university level and at the national level. He was also among the most prominent critics and activists against the single-party regime. Alongside Raila and other notable politicians, Orengo agitated for multiparty democracy, a new constitution, and free and fair elections, among other issues of public interest.

Orengo says that being an activist has not always been easy, and sometimes he had to flee the country for his own good. He was exiled in Tanzania, Uganda, and Zimbabwe in the early 1980s to escape the repressive Kanu regime.

An attempted coup against Tanzania's President Julius Nyerere in 1964 would come back to haunt Orengo in the early 1980s. He was repatriated alongside Kenya Air Force soldiers who had tried to oust President Moi in 1982 in a swap with Tanzanian soldiers who had escaped to Kenya. He describes the journey from Namanga to Naivasha prison in a police lorry as a harrowing experience. He was kept in Kamiti and Naivasha's maximum prisons. At some point, he shared the cell with the 1982 attempted coup leader Hezekiah Ochuka. "It was a journey to hell. We were beaten and subjected to all manner of abuse. You were expected to keep your head between your legs throughout the entire harrowing journey," he recalls.

For his constant agitation, the government decreed he would not be allowed to undertake his pupilage in Nairobi after completing his law degree. He ended up in Kericho. However, even when he was away from the capital, his activism was felt at the State House. He was instrumental in organizing countrywide demonstrations in the wake of politician J.M. Kariuki's brutal murder in 1975.

=== Advocating for constitutional reforms and multi-party democracy ===
Orengo became well known for his fight against the unjust rule and spent several years in detention as a result. He was, together with six other MPs, part of the Seven Bearded Sisters. Orengo, along with Michael Kijana Wamalwa, Kiraitu Murungi, Raila Odinga, and Paul Muite, was among the Young Turks who, along with Jaramogi Oginga Odinga, Masinde Muliro, and Martin Shikuku, brought about what was termed as Kenya's second liberation. They formed the formidable Forum for the Restoration of Democracy (FORD), a vehicle that nearly pushed KANU, the ruling party, out of power in the 1992 general election. He is a founding member of Muungano wa Mageuzi (Movement for Change), a cross-party lobby group.

=== Politics ===
==== Member of Parliament ====
Orengo was elected as an MP for Ugenya Constituency as a KANU candidate in a by-election in 1980. He became the youngest MP, at age 29. He was subsequently elected as an MP in December 1992 on a FORD-Kenya ticket. He was re-elected in December 1997 on a Ford-Kenya ticket but lost his seat in the 2002 general elections when he also contested for the presidency on a Social Democratic Party ticket.

==== 2002 Presidential run ====
Orengo ran for the presidency in 2002 for the Social Democratic Party (SDP), but finished fourth with just 0.4% of the votes. His party lost all of its parliamentary places, as many SDP's leading figures had joined the NARC coalition.

==== 2007 Parliament run ====
As of 2007, he was still the SDP chairman which supported Raila Odinga of Orange Democratic Movement at the 2007 general elections. In the 2007 elections Orengo won the Ugenya Parliamentary seat on an ODM ticket. He had been out of parliament since the 2002 elections after losing the seat to Archbishop Stephen Ondiek.

During the post-election crisis, Orengo served as one of four spokesmen for the Orange Democratic Movement in its attempts to settle its dispute with the Party of National Unity following the disputed presidential elections in Kenya in 2007.

==== Ministry for lands ====
Orengo was sworn in as a Minister for Lands in the new Coalition Government formed by the National Accord Act of 2008. This is his first stint as a cabinet minister.

Orengo revealed the sale of the Grand Regency hotel at 2.7 billion Kenyan shillings (approximately €30 million EUR). He announced the transfer of ownership from the Central Bank of Kenya to the new Libyan owners had taken place under the direction of Amos Kimunya, finance minister. This set off the Grand Regency Scandal.

==== Senate ====
Orengo was sworn in during 2013 as the senator for Siaya County. In 2017, he was re-elected as a senator in the same county. In 2018, he was chosen by his party leader, Raila Amollo Odinga, to replace Moses Wetangula as the minority leader in the Kenyan Senate. In 2019, Orengo was appointed by President Uhuru Kenyatta and Raila Odinga as part of the task force team to implement the Building Bridges Initiative.

==== Siaya Governor ====
In the 9 August 2022 general election, he won the Siaya governor seat with the ODM party under the Azimio la Umoja One Coalition.

== Personal life ==
He is married to advocate and human rights expert Betty Kaari Murungi.

== Tenure as governor ==
Since being elected as the Governor of Siaya County in August 2022, James Orengo has focused on strengthening governance, land justice, and public service delivery while addressing misinformation about his leadership.

=== Healthcare expansion and grassroots empowerment ===
In 2024, Orengo's government intensified efforts to improve healthcare facilities and community empowerment programs. The county government launched the renovation and expansion of Nyang’u Health Centre in Ugenya and restocked major hospitals to address persistent drug shortages. Residents of Ugenya praised the governor for the visible improvements, citing enhanced service delivery and reduced child mortality rates.

The administration also initiated a youth empowerment program targeting small-scale entrepreneurs and boda boda operators, providing training and access to microfinance through the Siaya County Enterprise Fund.

=== Land and community rights ===
In April 2025, Orengo led efforts to resolve long-standing disputes over community land in the Yala Delta. He emphasized that Siaya welcomes investment but will continue to protect local land ownership and ensure that development projects benefit residents directly

=== Public communication and governance ===
In August 2025, Siaya County officials clarified that Governor Orengo was away attending to a private matter following public speculation about his absence. The county secretary confirmed that all county operations remained uninterrupted and that the governor continued to oversee administrative functions.

Source: Kenyans.co.ke – County explains Governor Orengo’s absence

=== Clarification on false resignation reports ===
Later in August 2025, the Siaya County Assembly Speaker dismissed false reports circulating online that claimed Governor Orengo had resigned. Independent fact-checking organizations verified that the resignation letter was fabricated and reaffirmed that Orengo remained in office.

=== Development and service delivery ===
By early 2025, residents of Ugenya Ward and other parts of Siaya County praised Governor Orengo for improvements in healthcare and infrastructure. His administration expanded the Nyang’u Health Centre, improved drug supplies in public hospitals, reduced child mortality rates, and upgraded local markets and feeder roads.

== See also ==
- Luo people of Kenya and Tanzania
