= Nyamninia =

Place in Kenya

Coordinates: 0°06′14″N 34°30′25″E

Nyamninia is a village in the Gem Location, Yala division of Siaya County, Kenya. Situated approximately 30 miles from Kisumu city, Nyamninia is home to the 100 kilowatts medium wave radio transmitters set up by Voice of Kenya (VoK); now renamed Kenya Broadcastic Corporation (KBC). It was the birthplace of the legendary Gem clan chief, Odera Kang'o who started a rice plantation scheme in the area about one hundred years ago. The Gem chief was responsible for construction the numerous schools in the region before his enforced exile in 1915, to Kampala, Uganda by the British colonialists.

At present, it is a business centre. Both Nyamninia Primary School and Nyamninia Secondary School are located within the centre.

Nyamninia is occupied mainly by the Kisa tribe (Luhya), an indigenous Luhya sub-tribe. The main bus stage is Muhanda shopping center. Nyamninia is divided in different suburbs that include Nyamninia, Bar Sauri, Bar Turo, Muhoho and Muhanda. Most of the people are Christians with a minority of Muslim community. Tourists attractions include Gunda Odera Kang’o ( the place Odera Kang’o presumably had his administrative base and home), Aora Msango, (a spring that keeps sprinkling even in dry seasons) Maseno equator crossing point (20 km away) and Ndano falls at River Yala. The majority of the inhabitants are mainly peasant farmers with Maize, Banans, Sweet potatoes, cassava and sugar cane as main cash crops. The third largest city of Kenya, Kisumu, is 50 km away and easily reachable through Busia-Kisumu highway.
