= Kipchumba Murkomen =

Kenyan politician

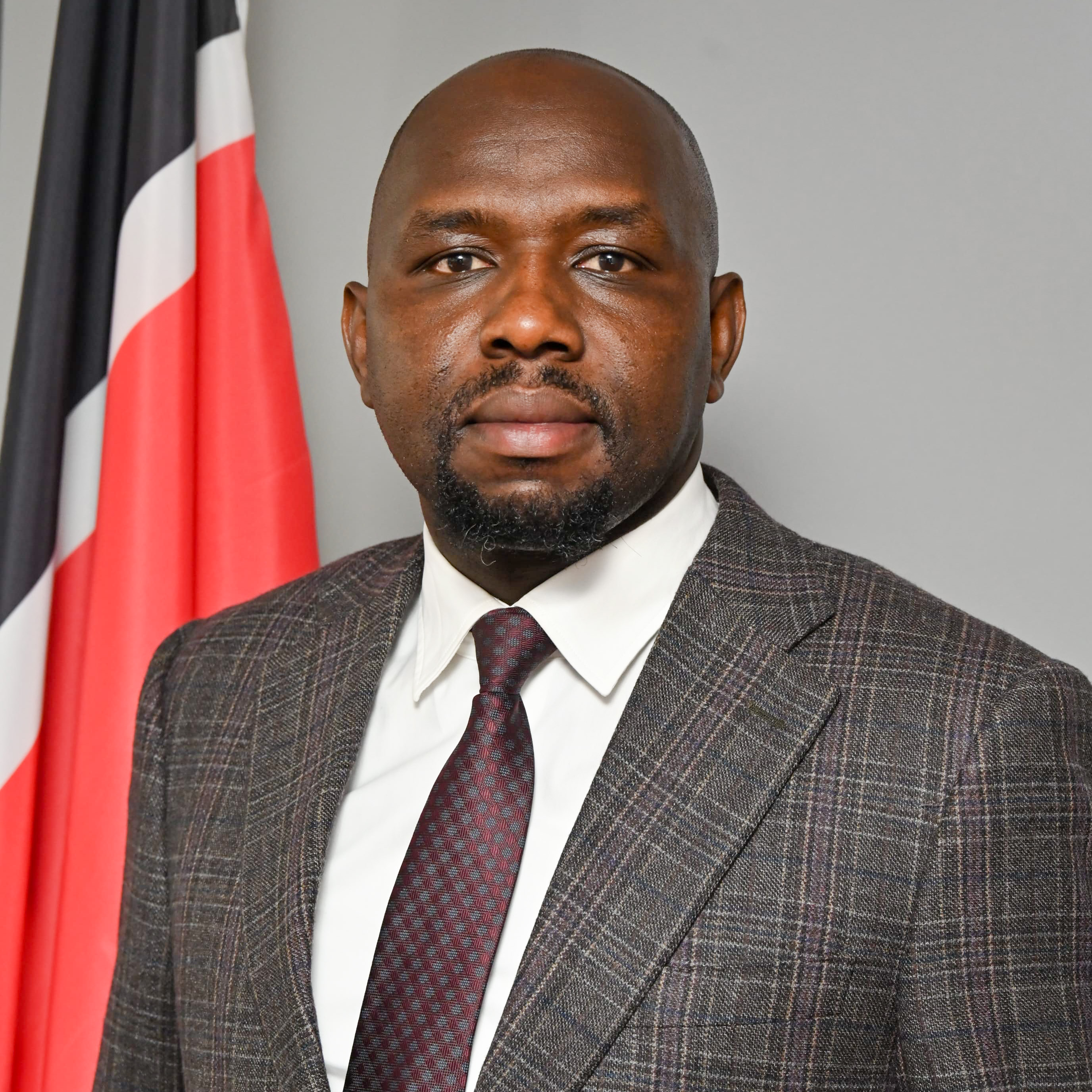

Cabinet Secretary - Ministry of Interior and National Administration
- Incumbent
- Assumed office 20 December 2024
- President: William Ruto
- Preceded by: Kithure Kindiki

Cabinet Secretary - Youth Affairs, Creative Economy and Sports
- In office 24 July 2024 – 19 December 2024
- President: William Ruto
- Preceded by: Ababu Namwamba
- Succeeded by: Salim Mvurya

Cabinet Secretary - Ministry of Roads, Transport and Public works
- In office 27 October 2022 – 11 July 2024
- President: William Ruto
- Succeeded by: Davis Chirchir

Majority Leader of the Senate
- In office 31 August 2017 – 11 May 2020
- Preceded by: Kithure Kindiki
- Succeeded by: Samuel Poghisio

Senator for Elgeyo-Marakwet
- In office 28 March 2013 – 27 October 2022
- Preceded by: Position established
- Succeeded by: William Kisang

Personal details
- Born: Onesimus Kipchumba Murkomen; 12 March 1979 (age 47) [Marakwet District], Rift Valley Province, Kenya
- Party: United Democratic Alliance
- Spouse: Gladys Wanjiru Kipchumba
- Children: 4
- Education: University of Nairobi (LL.B); Washington College of Law (LL.M); The University of Pretoria (LL.M)

Onesimus Kipchumba Murkomen (born 12 March 1979) is a Kenyan lawyer and politician serving as the Cabinet Secretary for Ministry of Interior and National Administration. He is also the former Cabinet Secretary for Youth Affairs, Creative Economy and Sports and also former cabinet secretary for Roads, Transport, and Public Works in Kenya. Murkomen is an Advocate of the High Court of Kenya and a three-time elected Senator of Elgeyo Marakwet County.

== Early life and education ==
He is the son of Johanna Murkomen Kanda and Mama Margaret.

Murkomen studied at Chawis Primary School in Embobut Forest, Marakwet East where he sat for his Kenya Certificate of Primary Education exam in 1993. He was not satisfied with the exams results and decided to retake the exam in 1994. He later joined St Joseph's High School Kitale and transferred to St Patrick's High School Iten, where he sat for the Kenya Certificate of Secondary Education exam.

In the year 2000 Murkomen joined the University of Nairobi, Parkland Campus and graduated with a Bachelor of Laws in 2004. While studying, he was elected chairman of Fellowship of Christian Unions’ National Students Executive Council. He was later awarded a scholarship to study a master's in law at the University of Pretoria, South Africa. He further studied at the American University Washington College of Law in United States.

== Career ==
Before he got into competitive politics, Murkomen was a political analyst and commentator at Citizen TV just before the 2013 general elections.

=== Politics ===
==== Senate ====
Murkomen was first elected as Senator for Elgeyo-Marakwet County in 2013 on a United Republican Party (URP) ticket. He vied for the same seat during the 2017 elections, this time on a Jubilee party ticket and was re-elected to a second term. Murkomen was elected majority senate leader in 2013, but he was later replaced by West Pokot Senator Samuel Poghisio as the Senate Majority Leader in 2020.

==== Cabinet ====
Before his nomination as a cabinet minister, Murkomen had been elected for the third time to be the senator for Elgeyo-Marakwet County in the 2022 general elections in a UDA party ticket. Murkomen won the seat with a 141,091 votes against his competitor former Elgeyo-Marakwet County governor Alex Tolgos who vied under the Jubilee Party and came second. He resigned as the senator in order to take the position of Cabinet Secretary. In September 2024, he participated at the 10 kilometer race at the Nairobi City Marathon and completed successfully.

== Controversies ==
=== NYS Scam Funds ===
In December 2016 Murkomen was accused of laundering funds received from NYS scam by receiving ksh 15 million($120,000) into his law firm's bank account as part of the money received from the scam then paid out to Out of the Box solutions which then paid Murkomen's law firm account. According to Murkomen's law firm the money was used to buy land in Eldoret on behalf of a client of the law firm who is also a reported suspect of the scam. The National Assembly public accounts committee that was investigating the matter demanded the law firm produce a land sale agreement and documents showing instructions for property purchase but the law firm declined citing confidentiality. Murkomen was reported to send insulting short text messages to committee members for demanding the documents. According to the committee there was no proof any land was bought using NYS scam share of loot sent to Murkomen's law firm account and he was politicizing the matter without accounting for the specific money the law firm was accused of receiving.

In the same month, December 2016 Oscar Sudi and former Nandi Hills Member of Parliament, Alfred Keter demanded that Murkomen carry his own cross in the scam, and that he should specifically explain how he received Sh 100 million ($900,000) from the NYS scam that he used to buy properties in Elgon View estate in Eldoret without dragging other Rift valley members of parliament into the scam or seeking sympathy from them.

In February 2016 Anne Waiguru filed an affidavit in court claiming Murkomen and William Ruto's then aide as Deputy president Farouk Kibet were part of a larger cartel that stole money from the NYS scam using fraudulent tendering. Following the affidavit EACC summoned Murkomen and Farouk Kibet over the scam. In April 2016 Anne Waiguru and another suspect in the scam Josephine Kabura filed further affidavits claiming that Murkomen had warned them to tell DCI to drop the investigations or face unspecified consequences.

In August 2018 Murkomen claimed Raila Odinga also pocketed a share of the NYS scam funds amounting to Ksh 100 million ($900,000) through Junet Mohammed who received money through questionable NYS contracts with Junet's companies. Murkomen claimed Junet took some of the money to Raila Odinga. In May 2020 a Nairobi High court found that the Public Accounts committee of Parliament of Kenya had no power to recommend to the DPP to prosecute the matter as its not an investigative agency.

=== Opulence ===
Murkomen has earned the reputation of being one of the most extravagant and expensively-dressed CSs in the current Kenyan Cabinet. In 2024, during a TV interview, he boasted owning expensive watch and dressing expensive suits, belts and shoes. This attracted a lot of backlash from Kenyans amid the tough economic times and the then ongoing Youth-led Protests against the punitive 2024 Finance Bill, with some questioning his source of inexplicable huge net-worth. He clarified of having invested in farming, real estate and mortgage, a venture that has see his net-worth appreciate over the years.

== Personal life ==
Murkomen is married to Gladys Wanjiru Kipchumba and is a father to three sons and a daughter.

Murkomen is a supporter of English Premier League club Manchester United.
