= David Ochieng Ouma =

Kenyan politician

David Ochieng Ouma is a Kenyan politician who is the leader of the Movement for Democracy and Growth. He is MP for Ugenya Constituency.

== Career ==
He is the Current MP Ugenya and MDG Party Leader.

== See also ==
- 13th Parliament of Kenya
