= Fred Kubai =

Member of the Kenya African Union (1917–1996)

Fred Kubai (1917 – June 1, 1996) was one of the Kapenguria Six, members of the Kenya African Union arrested in 1952, tried and imprisoned.

He was a Kikuyu, and a leader of the Kenya Transport Workers Union and the East African Trade Union Congress. Kubai organized attacks against the European government in Nairobi. In May 1950, he was tried and acquitted of the assassination attempt of a city official. On 22 October 1952, Fred Kubai, together with Bildad Kaggia, Kung'u Karumba, Jomo Kenyatta, Paul Ngei, and Achieng Oneko, was charged with organizing the Mau Mau Uprising.

== Early life and military service ==
Fred Kubai was born in 1917 in Nairobi, Kenya. He attended Buxton High School located in Mombasa, graduating in 1931. Fred Kubai had four wives and after separating with his wives fell in love with his house help Christina Gakuhi. In 1991, he wrote a will that saw Christina Gakuhi entitled to all of his properties. He then worked for the East African Post and Telecommunications as a telegraphist from 1931 to 1946. During World War II, he also served as part of the telegraph battalion in the British Army in Lodwar.

== Labour leader ==
In 1946, Kubai ended his telegraphist career and joined the African Workers Federation. The following year, he formed the Kenya African Road Transport and Mechanics Union, which later came to be known as the Transport and Allied Worker Union.

== Mau Mau ==
On 22 October 1952, Bildad Kaggia, Kung'u Karumba, Jomo Kenyatta, Fred Kubai, Paul Ngei, and Achieng Oneko were charged with organizing the Mau Mau Uprising. They were found guilty and sentenced to ten years in prison.

== Sources ==
- Christenson, Ron (1991). Political Trials in History: From Antiquity to the Present. Transaction Publishers. ISBN 9781412831253.
- Okoth, Assa (2006). A History of Africa: African nationalism and the de-colonisation process. East African Publishers. ISBN 9789966253583.
- Gates Jr., Henry Louis; Akyeampong, Emmanuel K.; Niven, Steven J., eds. (2 February 2012). Dictionary of African Biography. OUP USA. ISBN 9780195382075.
- "Former Kenyan Official Paul Ngei Dies at 81". The Washington Post. 23 August 2004.
- "Paul Ngei, 81, Mau Mau Rebel And Cabinet Minister in Kenya". The New York Times. The Associated Press. 23 August 2004.
