= Lwak Girls' High School =

School in Kenya

Coordinates: 0.14231°S 34.35747°E

Lwak Girls High School is a girls' high school in Kenya. The school was built in the 1960s (with around 300 girls), and has grown drastically over the years. It is located in Rarieda District, Nyanza province in western Kenya.

Computer Studies was introduced as an examinable subject in the year 2002 by Mr. Lawi Osoo. In 2007, with support from Teach A Man To Fish, an apiary was installed to aid the teaching of bee-keeping, thus extending the school's agricultural science department. The school operates a nursery where mango trees are grown, with the aim of reducing the occurrence of Vitamin A deficiency.

== Administration ==
B.O.G. Chairman is Prof Rosemary Atieno; the school's Principal is Roseland Shiramba

== Notable alumnae ==
- Lucy Gichuhi, Australian politician
- Dorcas Oduor, Attorney General of Kenya
- Eva Wangui Muchemi, founder and executive director of Diabetis Management Information Centre (DMI)
