= Kagwa =

Town in Kenya

Coordinates: 00°12′57″S 034°13′31″E

Kagwa is in West Uyoma Location, Rarieda Constituency in Siaya County, Kenya.
