= National Youth Service scandal =

The National Youth Service Scandal was a corruption scandal within Kenya's Ministry of Devolution and Planning. Ksh. 791 million ($7,650,000) is said to have been stolen from the ministry's coffers, with some saying that figure could have been as high as Ksh. 1.8 billion ($17,400,000). On October 31, 2024, Milimani Anti-Corruption Court Magistrate Wendy Kagendo delivered the verdict, jailing two NYS officials for clearing the transactions.

== Background ==
In September 2015, Kenya's director of public prosecutions asked Anne Waiguru, then Devolution Cabinet Secretary, to record a statement over the disappearance of Ksh. 791 million from the ministry of Devolution and Planning. Public Accounts Committee chairman Nicholas Gumbo said he was looking into the ministry's accounts in which the ministry had bought overpriced items including condom dispensers for $250; a television set worth Ksh. 1.7 million ($17,000) and sex toys. Waiguru denied these allegations on her Facebook page saying that she is not involved in the purchase of anything for the ministry. She said that no money had gone missing from the ministry's coffers.

On 22 November 2015, Waiguru stepped down from her cabinet position following pressure from the public and the opposition on her role in the scandal. There was also additional pressure from some members of the Jubilee Alliance, of which she was a member, who viewed her as a political liability. She said that her doctor had advised her to step down as the pressure negatively affected her health.

In February 2016, she was cleared by the Ethics and Anti-Corruption Commission (EACC) on all charges. However, in March 2016, EACC Chairman Phillip Kinisu said that there had been errors in clearing Waiguru. He stated that these errors had been as a result of a communication breakdown between government agencies.

Deputy president, William Ruto, initially defended Waiguru saying all accusations against her were false and that they were the creations of the opposition to paint the government as being lax in fighting corruption. He later retracted this statement and said that Waiguru should take responsibility for the millions that went missing in her ministry.

Others mentioned in the scandal include Josephine Kabura, Ben Gethi, Adan Harakhe, Mutahi Ngunyi and Kipchumba Murkomen.

== Public Accounts Committee Hearing ==
The Public Accounts Committee (PAC) chaired by Hon. Nicholas Gumbo summoned, among others, Anne Waiguru, Josephine Kabura, CID boss Ndegwa Muhoro, Mutahi Ngunyi, Hillary Sigei, Nelson Githinji and Ben Gethi severally.

Members of the PAC included MPs Jackson Rop (Kipkelion West), Abdikadir Aden (Balambala), Timothy Bosire (Kitutu Masaba), Mbadi John Ng'ongo (Gwassi), Fathia Mahbuub (Mandera), Japhet Kareke Mbiuki (Maara South) and Clement Wambugu (Mathioya).

== Josephine Kabura ==
Josephine Kabura Irungu is the owner of at least 11 companies that won various contracts at the National Youth Service. She is accused of having been overpaid on each one of those contracts. She has been described in sections of the media as a hairdresser. She told the PAC that she is an IT expert with a diploma and higher diploma from the Kenya College of Accountancy.

Kabura says she met Waiguru while working at the Ministry of Finance, specifically in the IFMIS department. During this time, she says she started running errands for Waiguru before culminating in her companies being appointed the sole contractors to deliver materials for National Youth Service projects. It was during this period that she met Adan Harrakhe who made payments to her in his role as Authority to Incur Expenditure (AIE) holder.

=== Kabura's affidavit ===
On 15 February 2016, Kabura filed an affidavit in court which described, in detail, her role in the scandal. In the affidavit, she explained how Waiguru helped her register companies that would later be awarded various contracts at the National Youth Service. She also said that she was specifically asked by Waiguru to open bank accounts at Family Bank's KTDA Plaza branch.

In her affidavit, she said that Waiguru was involved in all levels of the scam and that they were advised by the director of the Banking Fraud Department, Joseph Mugwanja. She details how most of the money she received as payment for work done ended up being given to people she described as 'suspicious'. For instance, at one point she was asked to give Ksh. 20 million to a Mohammed which, she was told, was to facilitate more business. In another instance, she was told by National Youth Service deputy director general Adan Harrakhe to deposit Ksh. 40 million into a bank account.

She details how she was asked to give some of the profits to a Ms. Loise Mbarire, Waiguru's sister. She delivered this money in gunny bags to Mbarire who had parked her car at the basement of the KTDA Plaza.

In her affidavit filed shortly after Kabura's, Waiguru stated that she did not know who Kabura was and neither did she help her in any way to conduct business with the National Youth Service.

=== Kabura's PAC appearance ===
Kabura thrice failed to appear before the PAC after being summoned. Her lawyer F. I. Omino twice wrote to the committee to reschedule her meetings. Committee member Bosire accused her of operating with impunity wondering who was protecting her.

Kabura appeared before the PAC on 23 February 2016. She revealed that her companies were not pre-qualified for the tender process at the National Youth Service even though all 20 of them eventually won tenders to supply various items. 15 of the 20 companies had not been registered by the time they were awarded tenders.

Her appearance before the PAC proved controversial. Gumbo accused her of being a hostile witness and said that her appearance before the committee was not helpful to the investigations. Mbadi questioned her honesty when testifying before the committee. When asked why she made abnormally huge cash withdrawals (some totaling Ksh. 100 million per day), she said that it was for the payment of wages for quarry workers and suppliers. However, when Bosire asked her to name the people who worked at the quarry and how much they were paid, she was not in a position to do so. When she was also asked to produce receipts of payments she received, she could not.

== Ben Gethi ==
Benson Gethi Wangui who was finally acquitted by the court had been accused of having fraudulently received payments from the National Youth Service through his companies Horizon Enterprises Ltd and Ratego Technologies. In his defense, Gethi says that the payments were for the supply of oil, lubricants and food commodities. During a hearing at the PAC, he admitted to inflating the price of fuel from the market price of Ksh. 78 per litre to Ksh. 104 per litre to cater for delayed payments

In her affidavit, Waiguru stated that during a meeting held on 27 May 2015 between her, Gethi and Peter Mang'iti, he (Gethi), intimidated Harakhe into allowing funds to go through IFMIS (Integrated Financial Management System), even though this, according to Harakhe, was done through theft of his password.

The committee asked him whether a contract for the supply of fuel worth Ksh. 500 million was ever executed since there was no documentation available. This, Mbiuki said, was because the proceeds from this particular contract mostly went into the purchase of property.

When he appeared before the PAC, Gethi said that documents prepared by Adan Harakhe had been altered by Waiguru to frame him. The Assets Recovery Agency also named his mother, Charity Wangui, and sister, Jedidah Wangari Wangui, as respondents to the case. His mother was ordered by the high court to surrender her 2014 Jeep Cherokee to the Assets Recovery Authority. The car was valued at Ksh. 7 million ($70,000).

== Adan Harakhe ==
Adan Harakhe, who was the acting senior deputy director general of the National Youth Service at the time of the scandal, was charged with abuse of office and conspiracy to commit an economic crime. He was charged together with devolution ministry senior secretary Hassan Noor, who was also the tender committee chairman. Harakhe appeared before the PAC on 4 October 2016. He said that his IFMIS password had been stolen and used to authorize a fraudulent payment of Ksh. 695 million ($6,730,000).

Questions were raised over his position as 'senior deputy director general', a position which was not provided by law. He also added that he had helped Waiguru whistleblow the scam and therefore should not be held as a suspect. Senior Principal Magistrate Felix Kombo issued warrants of arrest for Harakhe and Noor but later lifted them. This was after their lawyer, Ahmednasir Abdullahi, said that they had presented themselves before court. They were granted a Ksh. 1 million cash bail and Ksh. 3 million bond.

== Mutahi Ngunyi ==
Mutahi Ngunyi's firm, The Consulting House, was hired to restructure the National Youth Service in what came to be known as the '5-Point Vision'. The company had two contracts - one for Ksh. 40 million and another one for Ksh. 50 million. While Ngunyi was fully paid for the first contract, auditor general Edward Ouko discovered that he was overpaid by Ksh. 12.5 million for the second one. On 5 July 2016, he wrote to the Public Service Cabinet Secretary Sicily Kariuki offering to make a refund of the overpaid amount if an internal audit found that his company was indeed overpaid. He never repaid the money.

== Kipchumba Murkomen ==
Kipchumba Murkomen, the senator for Elgeyo Marakwet County, was accused of having received Ksh. 15 million from Out of the Box Solutions. Murkomen is said to have received this money through his law firm Sing'oei, Murkomen and Sigei (SMS) Advocates. Out of the Box Solutions has been accused of having received millions through fraudulent National Youth Service contracts. Murkomen was mentioned together with Farouk Teigut Kibet, deputy president William Ruto's personal aide.

== PAC recommendations ==
In its report released on 20 April 2017, the committee recommended that Waiguru should not run for any public office if found guilty after due process. It also recommended the prosecution of Murkomen as well as Central Bank of Kenya (CBK) governor Paul Njoroge for abetting money laundering.

Hillary Sigei, the managing partner of SMS Advocates, was to be charged with withdrawing and using Ksh. 500,000 for personal use, which were proceeds of crime.

== Criminal charges enacted ==
On 28 May 2018, it was revealed that 40 civil servants and 14 private sector officials, including National Youth Service (NYS) Director General Richard Ndubai, were arrested on charges related to the scandal.

== See also ==
- Anglo Leasing Scandal
- Corruption in Kenya
- Goldenberg Scandal
