= Anyieka =

Anyiko
- Location within Kenya
- Coordinates: 0.23°N 34.27°E
- Country: Kenya
- Province: Nyanza Province
- Time zone: UTC+3 (EAT)

Anyieka is a settlement in Kenya's Siaya County.

== History ==
Before the Kenyan general election in 2013, Anyieka voted as part of the Nyanza Province.
