= Davis Chirchir =

Kenyan politician

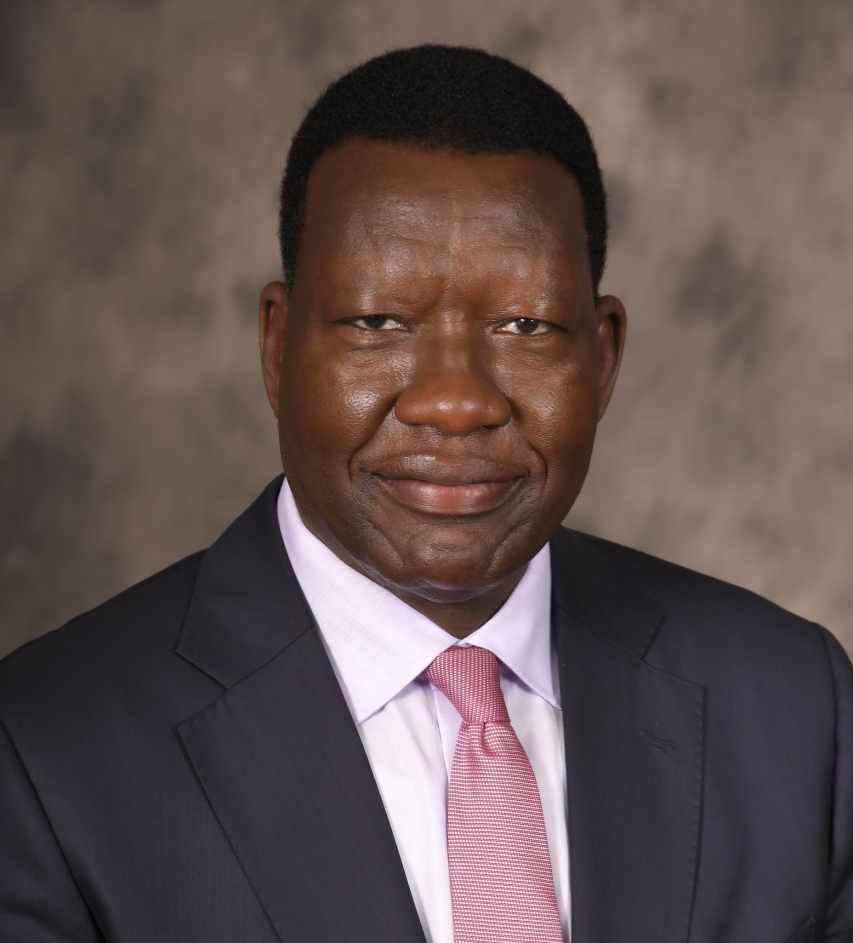

Cabinet Secretary for Roads and Transport
- Incumbent
- Assumed office August 8, 2024
- President: William Ruto
- Preceded by: Kipchumba Murkomen

Personal details
- Born: c. 1960 (age 65–66)
- Party: UDA
- Children: 4
- Education: University of Nairobi (BSc); Royal Holloway (MBA)

Davis Chirchir (born 1960) is a Kenyan politician who is currently serving as Cabinet Secretary for Roads and Transport. He previously served as Cabinet Secretary for Energy and Petroleum in the Uhuru Kenyatta Administration from 2017 to 2022 and in the William Ruto Government from 2022 to 2024.

== Early life and education ==
Davis Chirchir was born in Cheptigit, Kericho in 1960. He joined Kericho high school in 1974 to 1978 when he completed. He later did Form 6 in 1979 to 1980. in 1981 he joined university and pursued a course in physics and computer science.

He graduated in 1985 and joined Kenya Post and Telecommunication Corporation where he worked as a tele-traffic engineer where he handled management of traffic engineering in telecommunication for nine months at Multimedia University.

Chirchir holds a master's in Business Administration in International Management from the Royal Holloway School of Management, University of London. He also holds a bachelor's degree in computer science and physics from the University of Nairobi.

== Career ==
Chirchir became a senior manager at Telkom Kenya. He also served as the secretary general for the United Republican Party (URP), between 2011 and 2013. Chirchir is credited for Jubilee's successes in the 2013 and 2017 general elections where Uhuru Kenyatta defeated Raila Odinga, emphasizing his credentials as a political operative.

Previously, Chirchir served as the Interim Independent Electoral Commission's (IIEC) Director of Information Technology. In 2017, he was appointed Chief presidential agent by President Kenyatta.

Having been President William Ruto's close ally for years, Davis also served as Chief of Staff in the office of Deputy President, following the death of his predecessor Amb. Kenneth Osinde, ahead of the 2022 General Elections.

On 27 September 2022, he was appointed by President William Ruto as the Cabinet Secretary in Charge of Energy and Petroleum, the same Ministry he was appointed to by retired 4th President Uhuru Kenyatta. He was dismissed by President William Ruto on 11 July 2024, along with almost the entire cabinet, following anti-government protests that put pressure on the President to act by dissolving his Cabinet and reconstituting it afresh as part of a series of demands by Gen-Z protesters, who have been actively demonstrating since June 2024, due to the high cost of living and the now defunct Finance Bill 2024 that would have increased taxation and other unfriendly measures on Kenyan citizens.

Davis Chirchir was reinstated in the Cabinet on 8 August 2024 in the position of Cabinet Secretary for Roads and Transport, succeeding Kipchumba Murkomen.
