= Washington Jakoyo Midiwo =

Kenyan politician (died 2021)

Jakoyo Midiwo
- Born: Washington Jakoyo Midiwo; 31 July 1966; Central Nyanza District, Kenya
- Died: 14 June 2021 (aged 54)
- Education: University of Nairobi
- Occupation: Politician

Washington Jakoyo Midiwo (31 July 1966 – 14 June 2021) was a Kenyan politician. He was a member of the Orange Democratic Movement party, elected to represent the Gem Constituency in the National Assembly of Kenya from 2002 till 2017.

== Education, Career ==
He completed his primary level at Ndori Primary School. He later went to Sawagongo High School for higher education. Jakoyo Midiwo graduated from The University of Nairobi (1979 to 1985). He was an MBA Accounting graduate.

Midiwo also served on several committees including;

- House Business Committee member from 2013.
- Catering and Health Club Committee from 2013
- Departmental Committee on Defense and Foreign Relations from 2013
- House Business Committee between 2008 and 2013
- Joint Committee on Parliamentary Broadcasting and Library from 2008 to 2013
- Departmental Committee on Finance, Planning and Trade from 2008 to 2013

== Death ==
Midiwo died following a Kidney failure on 14 June 2021 at the age of 54.
