= Anne Waiguru =

Kenyan politician

Her Excellency Anne Mūmbi Waigūrū, EGH
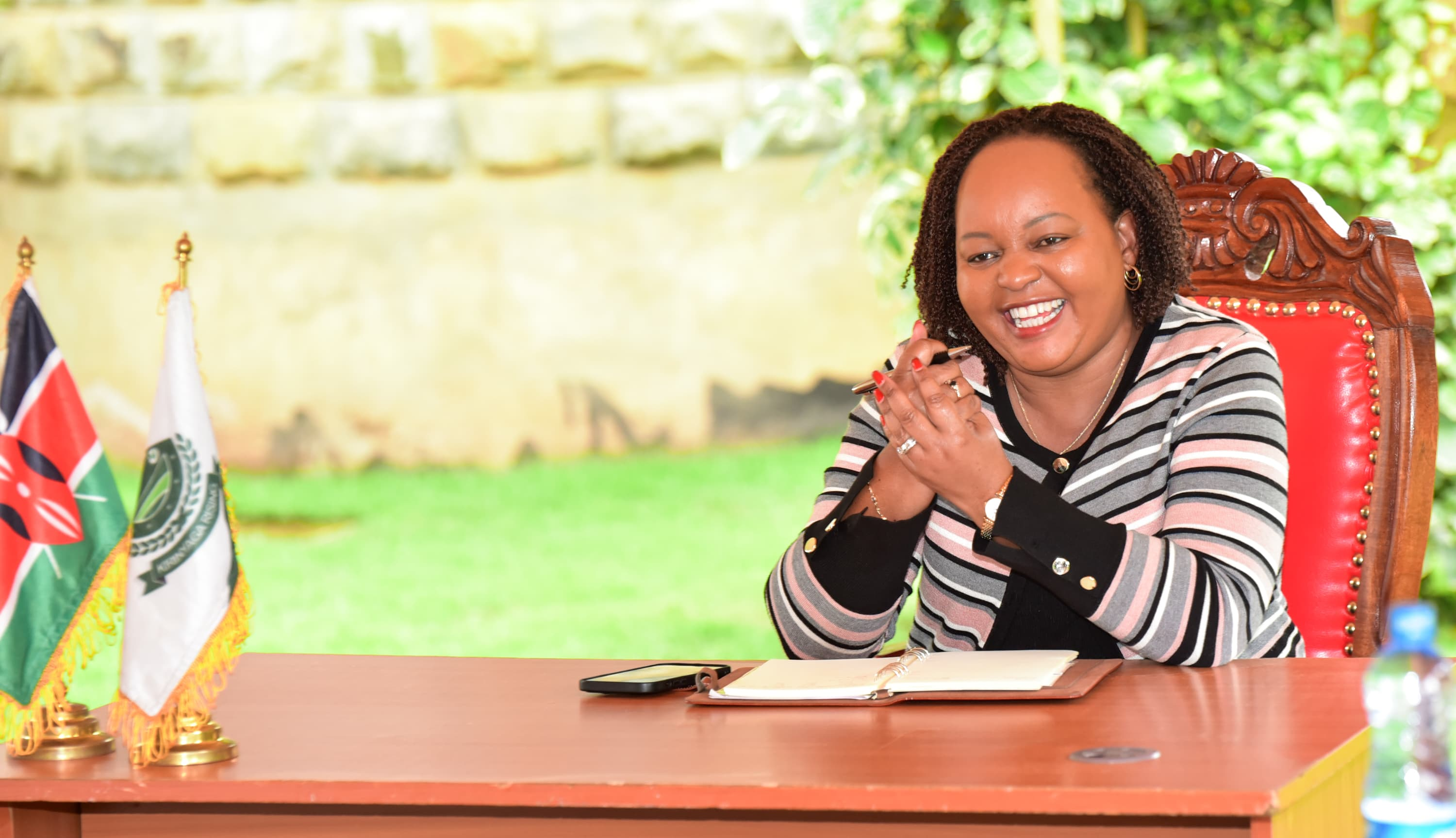

Chairperson, Council of Governors (COG) Emeritus, 2022–October 2024(CoG)

Second-term Governor of Kirinyaga County
- Incumbent
- Assumed office 22 August 2017
- Deputy: David Githanda

Cabinet Secretary for Devolution
- In office 15 May 2013 – 21 November 2015
- President: Uhuru Kenyatta

Personal details
- Born: Anne Mūmbi; 16 April 1971 (age 55)
- Party: United Democratic Alliance (Kenya)
- Children: 3
- Education: Egerton University; University of Nairobi

Anne Mūmbi Waigūrū, EGH, (born 16 April 1971) is the second Governor of Kirinyaga County in Kenya, who has been in office since 22 August 2017, currently in her second term.

== Education ==
She attended Nairobi River Primary School and later Precious Blood Girls' Secondary School, Riruta where she sat for her O-Level exams in 1987. She then joined Moi Forces Academy, Nairobi for her A-Level exams in 1989. At Moi Forces Academy, Waigūrū studied mathematics, physics, and chemistry. Upon graduating from Egerton University with a bachelor's degree in agriculture and home economics, she worked for Transparency International as an intern and research assistant, and then joined the Kenya Leadership Institute. Waigūrū holds a master's degree in economics from the University of Nairobi, and has specialized experience in public finance, financial management systems, public service reform, capacity building and governance.

== Career ==
Waigūrū began her career in the public service by providing technical assistance to the Public Service Reform Secretariat in what was then the Cabinet Office. She then served as the Head of Governance and the Economic Stimulus Programme at the National Treasury, alternate to the Permanent Secretary/National Treasury in the Public Procurement Oversight Authority and advisory board and the Women Enterprise Fund Board. She was successfully nominated in 2011 as one of the Top 40 under 40 women in the country, the only nominee at the time from the Public Service.

Waigūrū was the director of the Integrated Financial Management and Information System (IFMIS), and Head of Governance at the National Treasury. She was briefly a senior public sector manager/assistant vice president, at Citi-group. Previously, she served as a technical advisor in the Cabinet Office, Office of the President on secondment from the World Bank. Waigūrū has served as the alternate to the Permanent Secretary National Treasury in the Public Procurement Oversight Authority Advisory Board, and, the Women Enterprise Fund Board. WTC President Mwai Kibaki honoured Waigūrū with an Order Grand Warrior title due to her exemplary performance at the Information System and Integrated Financial Management. Her team through her leadership also won three Awards for good performance in public service.

At the end of August 2016, Waigūrū declared her interest in politics and registered for TNA membership. This was in preparation for the 2017 general election where she was planning to vie for the Kirinyaga County gubernatorial seat.

== Political career ==
Waigūrū made history in the 2017 general elections when she, alongside Charity Ngilu and the late Joyce Laboso became the first female governors to be elected in Kenya since the introduction of the devolved system of governance following the promulgation of the 2010 constitution. She was re-elected to office as Governor for her second 5-year term in the elections that were held on 9 August 2022.

Previously, she served as the first Cabinet Secretary in the Ministry of Devolution and Planning. She was nominated by H.E. President Uhuru Kenyatta to the position on 25 April 2013. She later resigned from the role in 2015 amidst corruption allegations during the 2015 National Youth Service scandal where Ksh. 791 million was misappropriated. In 2016 she implicated the then Majority Leader in the National Assembly Aden Duale, William Ruto's personal aide Faruk Kibet and Kipchumba Murkomen in the corruption scandal through an affidavit she filed at the High Court. No investigations were ever done on the three with all of them denying the allegations. Consequently, she was cleared in February 2016 by the Ethics and Anti-Corruption Commission (EACC) on all charges. However, in March 2016, EACC Chairman Phillip Kinisu said that there had been errors in clearing Waigūrū. He stated that these errors had been as a result of a communication breakdown between government agencies.

She is behind the establishment of Huduma Centres, places where Kenyan citizens can access government services more efficiently in their respective counties. as well as the 30% procurement rule, which accords at least 30 per cent of all supply contracts to the government to the youth, persons with disability and women.

Anne Mūmbi Waigūrū was also among the seven women Governors in Kenya elected in the 9 August 2022 Kenyan general election. The other Kenyan female governors include Susan Kihika-Nakuru County, Gladys Wanga-Homa Bay County, Cecily Mutitu Mbarire of Embu County, Wavinya Ndeti of Machakos County and Fatuma Achani of Kwale County as well as Kawira Mwangaza-Meru County. They are known as the G-7 governors. This is the highest number of women in this position since the implementation of the devolved system of government in Kenya in 2013. During the 2017 general election in Kenya, only three women were elected as governors against a total of 44 male governors.

Waigūrū was the first female vice chair of the Council of Governors in Kenya between December 2017 and January 2019. She was elected as the chairperson in September 2022, becoming the first female to serve as chairperson of the Council of Governors in Kenya.

In 2023, she was unanimously re-elected for a second term as the chair of Council of Governors (COG) during a full council meeting held in Nairobi. Upon her re-election, Waigūrū said that her focus would now be ensuring that all devolved functions and subsequent resources are fully handed over to the county governments. In 2024 she was one on the G7 governors who toured Machakos County in support of Wavinya Ndeti.

== Kirinyaga Governor ==
In 2017, Waigūrū was elected Governor of Kirinyaga County, making her one of only three women governors in the country. She steered the county in developing a Sessional Paper for the county with a 15-year agenda titled the Mountain Cities Blueprint. The paper is the first sub-national paper in the country. She has also undertaken healthcare reforms, transport, and infrastructure upgrades and is developing an industrial park to manufacture local produce.

She has implemented a social economic empowerment program dubbed Wezesha Kirinyaga, that focuses on four value chains namely poultry, dairy, avocado and tomatoes. In poultry, 32 community groups comprising 900 households are supported to produce one million eggs a month, earning an extra KSh.1,000/= daily for each of the households. The dairy, avocado, and tomato projects focus on the establishment of processing factories with an aim of adding value to agricultural produce.

The other project is an apparel factory where women are employed to make hospital linen and school uniforms.

The 2022 general election saw Waigūrū defend her seat as she was re-elected for her second term as Kirinyaga county governor. Waigūrū was declared winner of the hotly contested race between her and Woman representative Purity Ngirici after garnering 113,088 votes.

In 2023, Waigūrū was elected as a member of the Executive Bureau of ORU Fogar, an international organization which aims to bring together regions from all over the world and represents them before other international organizations in order to boost a global policy of balanced development and territorial cohesion with its headquarter in Barcelona, Spain.
