= Kapenguria Six =

Kenyan pre-independence detainees

The Kapenguria Six – Bildad Kaggia, Kung'u Karumba, Jomo Kenyatta, Fred Kubai, Paul Ngei and Achieng Oneko were the six leading Kenyan nationalists who were arrested in 1952, tried at Kapenguria in 1952–53, and imprisoned thereafter in Northern Kenya.

== Prelude ==
Evelyn Baring was the new Governor, who arrived in Kenya on 30 September 1952.

After the European invasion, large amounts of Kenya's best land were alienated for exclusive white use. Kenyans were allowed to remain as tenant farmers ('squatters') on land they had previously owned or newly cultivated; their terms of service steadily worsened. At Olenguruoune in 1944, 11,000 squatters were expelled, the beginning of the last act of a land dispute that had raged since the 1920s. The first Mau Mau oaths were probably administered there and then. Kenyatta returned home from the UK in 1946. By 1947, oathing had spread all over Kikuyuland and into Nairobi. Mitchell, the previous Governor, proscribed the new organisation – now called Mau Mau – in 1950.

On 9 October 1952, Senior Chief Waruhiu was shot and killed by Mau Mau gunmen. Baring had been on a tour of Central Province. It was cut short. At the funeral, he and Kenyatta locked eyes over the casket; days afterwards, Baring signed the arrest warrants for the Six.

== Operation Jock Scott ==
On the night of 20/21 October, a mass arrest was carried out of Mau Mau and Kenya African Union (KAU) leaders. There is some doubt about the actual number of arrests. Baring had signed the Emergency order on the evening of the 20th, the emergency was publicly proclaimed on the morning of the 21st. Troops from the Lancashire Fusiliers, flown in on the 20th, were in place later that day, patrolling the African areas of segregated Nairobi.

== The trial ==
Anthony Somerhough, the Deputy Public Prosecutor, opened proceedings on 3 December 1952. The charge against the defendants was that they had jointly managed a proscribed society (and that the proscribed society, the Mau Mau, had conspired to murder all white settlers in Kenya).

The Emergency Committee of KAU comprising Fanuel Walter Odede, Joseph Murumbi, and W.W.W. Awori sought a strong and experienced legal team for the Kapenguria Six. The defence was led by Denis Nowell Pritt, assisted by a multiracial team: HO Davies, a Nigerian; Chaman Lall, an Indian and friend of Nehru; and the Kenyans Fitz De Souza, Achhroo Ram Kapila, and Jaswant Singh. In line with the segregationist legislation then in force, they were prohibited from staying in the same hotel.

Baring offered Ransley Thacker, the presiding judge, an unusually large pension, and that from the Emergency fund rather than a more conventional source; the two also maintained secret contact during the trial. Witnesses were suborned, as Baring admitted in a letter to Lyttelton, saying that "every possible effort has been made to offer them rewards". Rawson Macharia, the key witness at the trial, was later to testify that he had been offered a university course in public administration at Exeter University College, protection for his family, and a government job on his return from the UK. Other witnesses were offered land at the Coast.

I would submit that it is the most childishly weak case made against any man in any important trial in the history of the British Empire.

— Denis Nowell Pritt, QC, gives his view of the case against Kenyatta

The crucial piece of evidence was Macharia's. He testified that in March 1950, he had taken one of the Mau Mau oaths at Kenyatta's hands. He further claimed that the oath had required him to strip naked and drink human blood. Macharia's submissions were the only evidence of a direct link between Kenyatta and Mau Mau produced before the court. However, Mau Mau was proscribed in August 1950, so, even had the claims been true, it is unclear that they would have proved Kenyatta's membership, let alone management, of a proscribed organisation. The defendants were all convicted, and sentenced to long terms and permanent restriction. All defendants got seven years each.

The remainder of the nationalist movement – in which Mboya and Odinga featured prominently – kept up the pressure for Uhuru and the release of the detainees: KANU's election slogan in the 1961 election was Uhuru na Kenyatta (Independence with Kenyatta). KANU won the election and then refused to form a government unless Kenyatta was released. Despite Renison's famous dismissal of Kenyatta as the leader "unto darkness and death", it was clear that he was indispensable; he was duly released in 1961. The rest of the Six were released soon thereafter.

Kenyatta went on to the presidency of Kenya; Kaggia and Ngei served as ministers; Oneko was detained by Kenyatta between 1969 and 1974, before later serving as MP for Rarieda in Kenya's 7th Parliament; Kung'u Karumba disappeared in 1975, while in Uganda on business; Fred Kubai twice served as MP for Nakuru East – from 1963 to 1974, and from 1983 to 1988 – before his death in June 1996.

== Bibliography ==
- David Anderson (2005), Histories of the Hanged: Britain's Dirty War in Kenya and the End of Empire. Weidenfeld & Nicolson: London. ISBN 0-297-84719-8
- Christopher Andrew (2009). The Defence of the Realm: The Authorized History of MI5. London: Allen Lane. ISBN 978-0-7139-9885-6. See in particular pp. 454–7.
- Piers Brendon (2007), The Decline and Fall of the British Empire (1781–1997), Jonathan Cape: London. ISBN 0-224-06222-0
- Caroline Elkins (2005), Imperial Reckoning: The Untold Story of Britain's Gulag in Kenya, New York:Henry Holt. ISBN 0-8050-8001-5
- Frederick Corfield (1960), The Origins and Growth of Mau Mau, Nairobi: Government Printer.
- R.B. Edgerton (1989), Mau Mau; an African Crucible. New York: The Free Press
- R. D. Hughes (1984), Emergency in Kenya: Kikuyu and the Mau Mau Insurrection Virginia: Marine Corps Command and Staff College
- Kaggia, Bildad M., Leeuw, W. de and Kaggia, M. (2012), The Struggle for Freedom and Justice; the life and times of the freedom fighter and politician Bildad M. Kaggia (1921-2005), Nairobi: Transafrica Press.
- Tabitha Kanogo (1987), Squatters and the Roots of Mau Mau, 1905–63, James Currey: London. ISBN 0-85255-019-7.
- John Kariuki (23 May 1999), "Uhuru heroes: Some got rich, others were not so lucky" The Nation, Nairobi.
- Jeremy Murray-Brown (1972) Kenyatta, London: George Allan
- John Lonsdale (2000), "Kenyatta's Trials: Making and Breaking an African Nationalist", in The Moral World of the Law, Peter Coss (ed), Cambridge University Press. ISBN 0-521-64059-8
- John Lonsdale (1990), "Mau Maus of the Mind: Making Mau Mau and Remaking Kenya", The Journal of African History, 31 (3): 393–421.
- Carl G.Rosberg Jr. and John Nottingham (1985) The Myth of Mau Mau; Nationalism in Colonial Kenya, Nairobi: Transafrica Press.
- Rawson Macharia (1991), The Truth about the Trial of Jomo Kenyatta, Nairobi: Longman. ISBN 9966-49-823-0
- Stephen Mburu (12 December 2000), "What Became of the Kapenguria Six?" The Nation, Nairobi.
- Kevin Morgan (2004), "Pritt, Denis Nowell (1887–1972)", Oxford Dictionary of National Biography, Oxford University Press, retrieved 27 Nov 2007
- Montagu Slater (1955), The trial of Jomo Kenyatta. London: Secker and Warburg. ISBN 0-436-47200-7
- David Throup (1985), "The Origins of Mau Mau", African Affairs, 84:399–433.
