= Yala, Kenya =

Place in Kenya

Coordinates: 0°06′N 34°32′E

Yala sub county is one of the administrative units of Siaya County, western Kenya. It is located 42 kilometres northwest of Kisumu, Kenya's third largest city. In 2009, it had a population of 25,769 and Yala town had a population of 2,438.

Yala is served by a railway station and the Kisumu-Busia highway. Ndanu water treatment works, a jaggery (formerly Yala White Sugar Company) and Odera Akang'o campus, a constituent college of Maseno University are some of the institutions found in Yala.

Yala is home to one of Kenya's pioneer learning institutions, St. Mary's School, Yala which was started by the Mill hill fathers in 1927. It also hosts Maliera Boys Secondary School.

== See also ==
- Nyamninia
- Railway stations in Kenya
