= Ugunja =

Town in western Kenya

Coordinates: 0.18138°N 34.2964°E

Ugunja town is a market town in western Kenya, located in Ugunja Division, Siaya County. It has a population of approximately 17,000 and is rapidly growing. Ugunja Division had a population of 79,113 according to the 1999 Kenyan census. This population grew to 104,241 people (48,912 males and 55,329 females) according 2019 Kenya Population and Housing Census which was conducted by the Kenya National Bureau of Statistics (KNBS). Most of the inhabitants in Ugunja are Luos.

Ugunja is located on the Kisumu-Busia highway, which links Kenya and Uganda. Ugunja town is 72 km north of the nearest city, Kisumu, which sits on the shores of Lake Victoria. The equator is 40 km south of Ugunja town.

Rural residents of Ugunja mainly depend on agriculture as their main source of food and income. The area receives two rainy seasons a year: March to June and September to December. The farming is mostly subsistence based, and major crops grown are sorghum, potatoes, cassava, beans, and maize. When farmers have surplus crops, they sell in local markets for income. In the past some farmers have grown cotton and coffee as cash crops, but due to market unreliability most farmers now prefer to grow food crops for their own families and local markets.

Ugunja town serves as a trading center for the community around it and the nearby urban centers. In the town most people work in small businesses and offices. There are a number of retail shops, bars, hotels, cafes, and residential houses. Also in the area are a bank, a post office, transport service companies, supermarkets, chemists, three health centers, dispensaries, and some private clinics. Ugunja town is also the location of the Ugunja Community Resource Centre.Some of the notable personalities from Ugunja include General (Rtd) Pastor Awitta (former commander of the Kenya Navy), Edward Ouko (former Auditor General in the Government of Kenya), Killen Awitta (Head of Global Rapid Response, Plan International UK).
