= Kung'u Karumba =

Kenyan political activist

Kung'u Karumba (1902-1974) was a Kenyan nationalist and freedom-fighter. He was a member of the Kapenguria Six, along with Bildad Kaggia, Jomo Kenyatta, Fred Kubai, Paul Ngei, and Achieng Oneko.

Kungu Karumba along with five other men, including Jomo Kenyatta, were arrested on October 20, 1952 in Kapenguria by British colonial governor, for being involved in a revolutionary group called the Mau Mau, which led a revolt against British colonial rule. Reason as to why the case was held in Kapenguria was so that the Mau Mau could not get to free the men. The area was remote at the time. He was convicted and locked up in prison for seven years with hard labor before the country's independence on December 12, 1963.

Following Kenya's independence, he remained a close friend and influential advisor to Kenyatta who had risen to Prime Minister of Kenya. Active as businessman, Karumba invested in Uganda. He loaned a substantial sum of money to the wife of Ugandan military commander Isaac Maliyamungu, but she did not pay back her debt. Karumba consequently travelled to Uganda in June 1974, and disappeared, his fate unclear. Intelligence reports later implicated Maliyamungu of murdering Karumba during a disagreement over his wife's debts.

== Family ==
Kung'u Karumba had a son called Abraham Karanja, daughters Philomena Njambi, Beatrice Wangari, Rose Njeri Ndungu among others.

== Business career ==
As a business man, Kung'u Karumba invested in the transport industry where he owned a fleet of long distance vehicles. He also ran a bulk oil haulage where he transported oil from the Port of Mombasa to Kampala and Bujumbura. In addition to that, he also owned a textile factory at downtown Nairobi.

== Legacy ==
In Kenya, Karumba is considered a national hero. His disappearance garnered much attention, and probably contributed to the deterioration of political relations between Kenya and Uganda. A popular musician at the time, Daniel Kamau, wrote a song entitled 'Where Did Kung'u Karumba Disappear To?'
