= Cornel Rasanga Amoth =

Kenyan politician

1st Governor of Siaya County
- In office March 2013 – 25 August 2022
- Preceded by: Position established
- Succeeded by: James Orengo

Public Procurement Administrative Review Board
- In office June 2006 – September 2012

Office of the Vice-President and Ministry of Home Affairs
- In office January 2005 – September 2005

Personal details
- Born: 22 May 1957 (age 69) Segere, Alego Siaya County, Kenya
- Party: ODM
- Spouse: Rosella Njaya Rasanga
- Children: Nudi, Ida, Tony, Fiona, Robina
- Education: University of Nairobi (LLB); University of Nairobi (LLM)
- Profession: Advocate

Cornel Rasanga Amoth (born 22 May 1957) is a Kenyan politician. He is a member of the Orange Democratic Movement and was elected as the first governor of Siaya County.

== Early life ==
Rasanga popularly known amongst his supporters as Pemblepe was born on 22 May 1957 to the late Senior Chief Amoth Owira and the late Yunia Nudi in Segere Village, Alego, in Siaya County. He attended Segere Primary School between 1963 and 1970 and Maranda High School for his O-Level secondary education between 1970 and 1974. He proceeded to Kisii High School for his A- level Secondary Education where he completed in 1977. Rasanga joined the University of Nairobi in 1979 and graduated with a Bachelor of Arts in Economics degree in 1981.

== Career ==
In 1982, Rasanga entered the public service in the Ministry of Agriculture as a supplies officer in charge of National Agricultural laboratories. To advance his knowledge in procurement, he joined the Kenya Institute of Administration (KIA) where he attained a Diploma in Supplies Management in 1985. Rasanga proceeded to work as a supplies officer in different districts and was promoted to senior procurement officer in charge of procurement and materials management. In 2000, Rasanga went back to university to pursue a law degree and graduated in 2003 from the University of Nairobi with a Bachelor of Law (LLB). He was admitted as an advocate of the High Court in 2005.

== Political career ==
Rasanga entered politics in 2013 when he vied for Governor for Siaya County. The Orange Democratic Movement selected Rasanga as its candidate after a disputed nomination between Oburu Odinga and Oduol. He won the 4 March general election but his election was nullified by the Court of Appeal in Kisumu on 23 August. Rasanga clinched the governorship in a subsequent by-election and became the first governor-elect of Siaya County. In 2017 he won the gubernatorial seat again flooring the then public accounts committee chair and Rarieda Mp Nicholas Odero Gumbo.
