= Bondo District =

Coordinates: 0.0998°S 34.2744°E

Bondo District was an administrative district in the former Nyanza Province of Kenya. Its capital town was Bondo. The Bondo District had a population of 238,780. The district was relatively new; it was created in 1998 from southern parts of the Siaya District. Bondo district has since been further split off from Rarieda District to its east.

The district had only two constituencies: Bondo Constituency and Rarieda Constituency.

Local industries are fishing and family farming. The district bordered the shore of Lake Victoria.

In 2010, the district was eliminated and the area is now part of Siaya County.

== District subdivisions ==
Local authorities (councils)
Authority	Type	Population*	Urban pop.*
Bondo	Town	29,165	7,797
Bondo County	County	209,615	4,405
Total	-	238,780	12,202
* 1999 census. Source:

Administrative divisions
Division	Population*	Urban pop.*	Headquarters
Bondo	79,833	7,456	Bondo
Madiany	58,784	0	Madiany
Rarieda	56,883	0	Madiany
Usigu	43,280	3,933	
Total	238,780	11,389	-
* 1999 census. Sources: , ,
