= Gem Constituency =

Kenyan electoral constituency

Gem
- constituency for the Parliament of Kenya
- Gem Constituency within Siaya County

- Siaya County within Kenya
- County: Siaya
- Population: 179,792
- Area: 405 km^{2} (156.4 sq mi)

Current constituency
- Number of members: 1
- Party: ODM
- Member of Parliament: Elisha Odhiambo
- Wards: 6

Gem Constituency is an electoral constituency in Kenya. It is one of six constituencies of Siaya County. The constituency was established for the 1963 elections. It had a population of 179,792 based on the 2019 census report and its current member of national assembly is Hon. Elisha Ochieng' Odhiambo of Orange Democratic Movement (ODM) party.

== Members of Parliament ==
Elections	MP	Party	Notes
1963	C.M.G. Argwings-Kodhek	KANU	
1969	Wasonga Sijeyo	Kenya People's Union KPU	One-party system. Sijeyo was detained for political reasons, resulting in by-election,
1969	Isaac Omolo Okero	KANU	By-elections. One-party system
1974	Isaac Omolo Okero	KANU	One-party system
1979	Aggrey Otieno Ambala	KANU	One-party system
1983	Horace Owiti	KANU	One-party system.
1985	Grace Ogot	KANU	One-party system.
1988	Grace Ogot	KANU	One-party system.
1992	Oki Ooko Ombaka	Ford-K	Multiparty political system
1997	Joe Donde	Ford-K	Multiparty political system
2002	Washington Jakoyo Midiwo	NARC	Multiparty political system
2007	Washington Jakoyo Midiwo	ODM	Multiparty political system
2013	Washington Jakoyo Midiwo	ODM	Multiparty political system
2017	Elisha Ochieng' Odhiambo	ODM	Multiparty political system
2022	Elisha Ochieng' Odhiambo	ODM	Multiparty political system

== County Assembly Wards ==
Ward	Registered Voters	Local Authority
North Gem	19,321	Siaya county
West Gem	14,228	Siaya county
Central Gem	13,633	Siaya county
Yala Township	13,874	Siaya county
East Gem	13,952	Siaya county
South Gem	18,560	Siaya county
Total	93,841	
