= Ugenya Constituency =

Kenyan electoral constituency

Ugenya
- constituency for the Parliament of Kenya
- Ugenya Constituency within Siaya County

- Siaya County within Kenya
- County: Siaya
- Population: 134,354
- Area: 324 km^{2} (125.1 sq mi)

Current constituency
- Number of members: 1
- Party: MDG
- Member of Parliament: David Ochieng
- Wards: 4

Ugenya Constituency is an electoral constituency in Kenya, established for the 1963 elections. It is one of six constituencies of Siaya County. based on the 2019 census report by the Kenya National Bureau of Statistics (KNBS), Ugenya is home to 134,354 people (62,624 males, 71,726 females and 4 intersex). The first Professor from Ugenya was Prof. Henry Odera Oruka. It is also home to Kenyan famous senior council and the incumbent governor of Siaya County Bob James Orengo.

== Members of Parliament ==
Elections	MP	Party	Notes
1963	John Odero Sar	KPU	One-party system
1969	Matthews Joseph Ogutu	KANU	One-party system
1974	Matthews Joseph Ogutu	KANU	One-party system
1979	Matthews Joseph Ogutu	KANU	One-party system
1980	James Orengo	KANU	By-elections
1983	Stephen Oluoch Ondiek	KANU	One-party system.
1988	Stephen Oluoch Ondiek	KANU	One-party system.
1992	James Orengo	Ford-K	
1997	James Orengo	Ford-K	
2002	Stephen Oluoch Ondiek	NARC	
2007	James Orengo	ODM	
2013	David Ochieng Ouma	ODM	
2017	Chris Odhiambo Karan	ODM	
2019	David Ochieng Ouma	MDG	By-election
2022	David Ochieng Ouma	MDG	

== Wards ==
Ward	Registered Voters	Local Authority
East Ugenya	4,770	Siaya County
Magoya / Rambula	3,014	Ugunja town
North East Ugenya	10,357	Siaya County
North Ugenya	6,771	Ukwala town
North West Ugenya	4,634	Ukwala town
South Ugenya	8,249	Siaya County
Uholo North	4,828	Siaya County
Ukwala East	4,409	Ukwala town
Ukwala West	4,330	Ukwala town
West Ugenya	3,817	Siaya County
Total	70,348	
*September 2005.

The larger Ugenya constituency having been found to be very large was later subdivided into two constituencies namely Ugunja and Ugenya Constituencies.

Ugenya constituency has four wards namely

. East ugenya ward

West Ugenya ward

North ugenya ward

South Ugenya ward(Ukwala)

== Villages in ugenya east ==
These are some of the villages found within Ugenya east ward within Ugenya sub county.

Bondo kolalo, Sihayi, Ujuan'ga, Lur, Uringi, Urenga A, Urenga B, Ramunde, komoro, usinda, Inungo, Bar-ober, Murumba, Masasia, ohando, uyore, Sirisia, kowinga, Anyiko

- Maugo
