= Achieng Oneko =

Kenyan politician

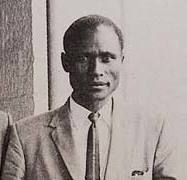
Achieng Oneko.

Ramogi Achieng Oneko (1920–2007) was a Kenyan freedom fighter and politician, considered a national hero in Kenya.

He was born in Tieng'a village in Uyoma sub-location in Bondo District in 1920 and educated at Maseno School.

== Detention ==
Oneko was one of the six freedom fighters arrested by the British colonial government in Kapenguria in 1952. Other members of the group, known as "Kapenguria Six" were Jomo Kenyatta, Paul Ngei, Bildad Kaggia, Kungu Karumba and Fred Kubai. They were arrested for allegedly being linked with the Mau Mau rebellion movement. Oneko was charged as "Accused No.3." After they were convicted, all six appealed the conviction.

The appeal judges found that Oneko had largely been convicted on the weight of a KAU meeting he had attended. The statements at the meeting were mostly in Kikuyu, which he did not understand at the time. Although the judges acquitted him of the charges on 15 January 1954, he was still held in detention with the other Kapenguria Five.

They were released nine years later, in 1961, two years before Kenya gained independence.

== Politics ==
The first parliamentary election were held on independence in 1963 and Achieng Oneko won the Nakuru Town Constituency seat. Jomo Kenyatta became the first president of Kenya and soon appointed Achieng Oneko Minister for Information, Broadcasting and Tourism. However, in 1966 Oneko quit the government and joined the newly created Kenya People's Union, a socialist party led by his comrade Oginga Odinga.

In 1969 he was arrested by his former friend Kenyatta following an incident in Kisumu during Kenyatta's visit to the town and was released in 1975.

Oneko returned to politics in 1992 when he was elected as an MP at the first multiparty elections in Kenya. He represented Ford-Kenya party, led by Oginga Odinga. However, he lost his Rarieda Constituency seat at the next elections held in 1997.

== Legacy ==
Achieng Oneko died of a heart attack on 9 June 2007 aged 87, at his home in Kunya village, Rarieda, Bondo District.

He left a widow, Loice Anyango. His eldest wife Jedida, died in 1992. He has 11 children, seven sons and four daughters. His oldest son is Dr Ongonga Achieng.

At the time of his death, Oneko was the only one of the "Kapenguria six" still alive. Mashujaa Day (previously known as Kenyatta Day until the promulgation of the new Kenya constitution on 27 August 2010) is a national holiday in Kenya that commemorates the detention of the Kapenguria Six on 20 October 1952.

== See also ==
- Luo people of Kenya and Tanzania
