= Raphael Tuju =

Kenyan politician

EGH Raphael Tuju
- Born: 30 March 1959 (age 67); Kenya
- Citizenship: Kenyan
- Known for: First African TV producer to win an International Emmy Award
- Political party: Jubilee Party (formerly NARC, PNU)

Raphael Tuju, EGH (born 30 March 1959) is a Kenyan politician, media professional, and public servant. Before joining politics, he worked as a journalist, television producer, and communications consultant. He was the first African TV producer to win an International Emmy award for a documentary on health and development. In 2002, Tuju began his political career when he was elected as member of Parliament to represent Rarieda constituency, in Siaya County.

== Education ==
Tuju attended Majiwa Primary School and Nakuru High School for his 4 years. He then joined Starehe Boys Centre for 2 years for his senior o level. He holds a Master of Arts (MA) degree in mass communications from the University of Leicester, United Kingdom.

== Career ==
=== Business ===
Tuju worked as an anchor for television news in the late 1980s and early part of the 1990s on a part-time basis. He was a producer and director of several documentaries, radio and television commercials for international agencies, public sector institutions, and private-sector bodies. He was a columnist for local newspapers notably the East African Standard.

He worked as lead consultant in the design and implementation of several public communication programs for a varied clientele that included the World Health Organization (WHO) in Geneva, the World Bank, the Department for International Development (DFID) of the British government, United States Agency for International Development (USAID), and the United Nations Development Programme (UNDP).

Between 1992 and 2001, he was a founder and director of Ace Communications.

He has interests in the real estate sector.

Of his accomplishments Tuju says,

"In my younger years, I worked as a Television Producer with several documentary films to my credit and earning the distinction of being the first TV Producer in Africa to win an International Emmy award for a TV production. I mainly addressed health and human development issues in my communication career with HIV/AIDS and Gender Empowerment being the main subject matter and in which I am credited with some of the major groundbreaking marks in Kenya".

=== Political ===
In 2002, Tuju was elected as a member of parliament (MP) for Rarieda constituency in the December 2002 parliamentary election. He served until 2007 and managed to promote the education sector in the region by building new classrooms. He also implemented a major water project for the Rarieda people and introduced an innovative mobile hospital to reduce infant mortality as a result of malaria and HIV/AIDS.

The National Rainbow Coalition took power in 2003 and Tuju was appointed to the positions of Minister of Information and Communications and Minister for Tourism and Wildlife. He became more famous in 2005 for his feud with then the Roads and Infrastructure Minister Raila Odinga. His political career continued to shine despite many threats and was appointed to the Foreign Minister docket on 8 December 2005 in a cabinet reshuffle.

He formed his Progressive People's Party (PPP) before the 2005 referendum with the aim of swaying votes away from the "Orange No Campaign" but defected his own party to join Narc-Kenya party through the LDP, a move which his Rarieda constituents and by extension the Luo Nyanza community treated as a betrayal to their loyalty.

He also served as Kenya's Foreign Affairs Minister between 2005 and 2007. He is particularly remembered for his bravery when he sensibly warned the European governments during the 29th Asillah cultural festivals held in Morocco in 2007 for establishing policies which deprive African Development through trade partnership. He contested for Rarieda parliamentary seat in 2007 for the second time under the Party of National Unity but was unsuccessful, he also lost his post as Minister for Foreign Affairs to Moses Wetangula under the former president Mwai Kibaki's government.

He became the legal Advisor to the President of Kenya between 2008 and 2011 and he specialized on matters relating to media and the management of diversity. He was also a Special Envoy of the President on various missions.

In 2012, Tuju launched his new political vehicle for the presidency, the Party of Action (POA) but did not go far with it. He later joined the former president Uhuru Kenyatta's Jubilee party and was elected as the party's Secretary General in 2017. He was later named by president as cabinet secretary without portfolio and served in this position until the end of their government's reign in 2022.

== Honours ==
Tuju was awarded the second highest civilian title in Kenya, E.G.H. (Elder of the Golden Heart) by President Mwai Kibaki for his many years of service to the people of Kenya in the area of health, human development and public service.

== Personal life ==
In 1986, Tuju married Ruth Akinyi. They divorced in 2013. He has three children: two daughters and a son.

On 12 February 2020, on the Nairobi–Nakuru highway, Tuju was involved in an auto accident while travelling to Kabarak to attend the burial of the late president of Kenya Daniel arap Moi.
