= Siaya =

Town in Kenya

Coordinates: 0°04′N 34°17′E

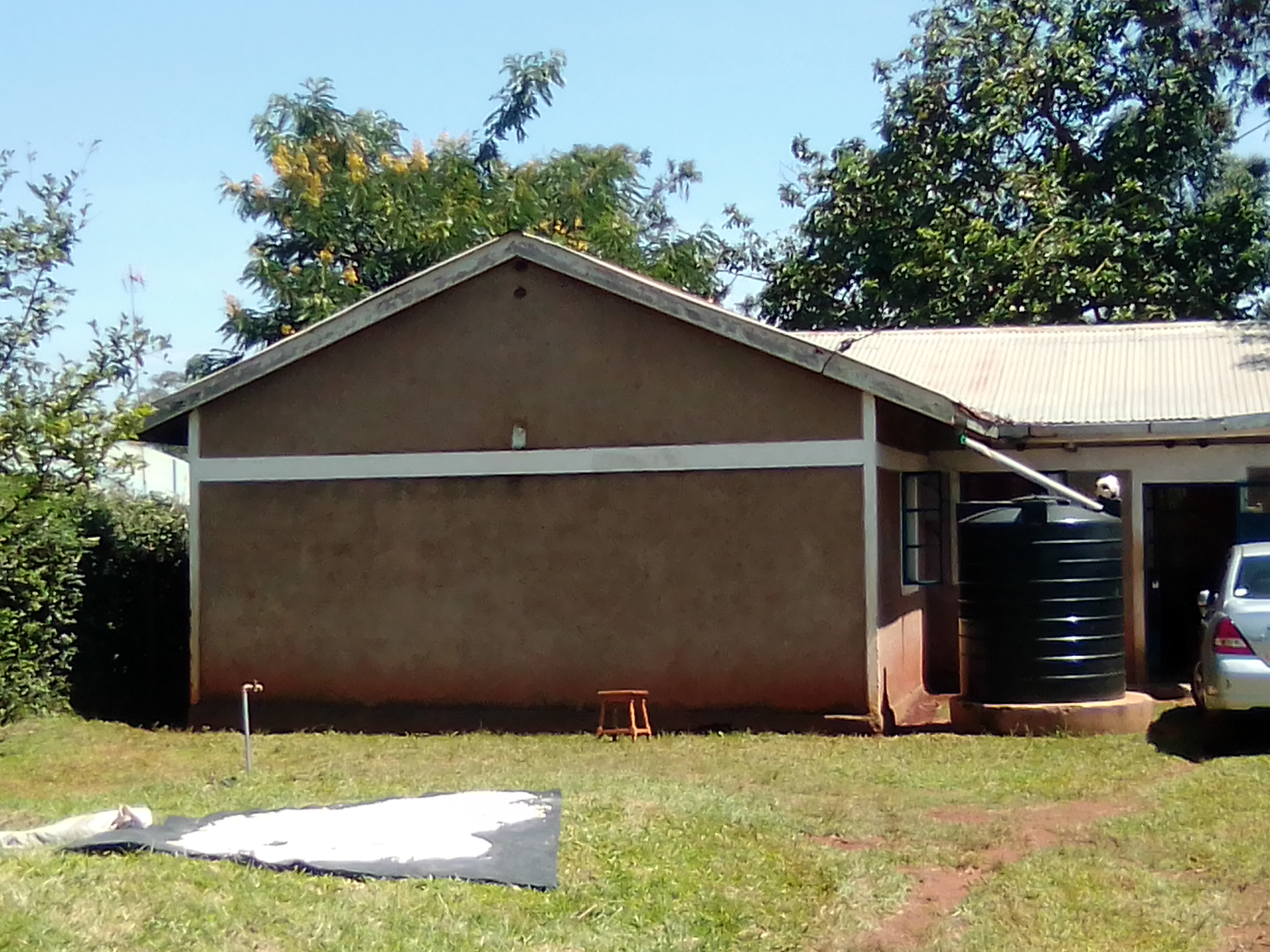
Typical middle-class house in Siaya

Siaya is a municipality and the capital of Siaya County, Kenya. It is located 74 km (46 mi) northwest of Kisumu. The urban center had a population of 33,153 in 2019.

Siaya municipality has five wards: Mjini, Siaya Central, Siaya East, Siaya North and Siaya West. All of them are part of Alego Constituency. With the new constitution, it is now in Siaya County of which it is the headquarters.

In the last 10 years Siaya has grown due to an increase in the learning possibilities in places like the Siaya Institute of Technology and the Siaya County Referral hospital. These two places have drawn in many students who have increased the population of the town.

== Notable individuals ==
- Jared Angira, poet
- Clarke Oduor, footballer
- Raila Odinga, politician and Kingpin of the Luo community
