= Paul Ngei =

Kenyan politician

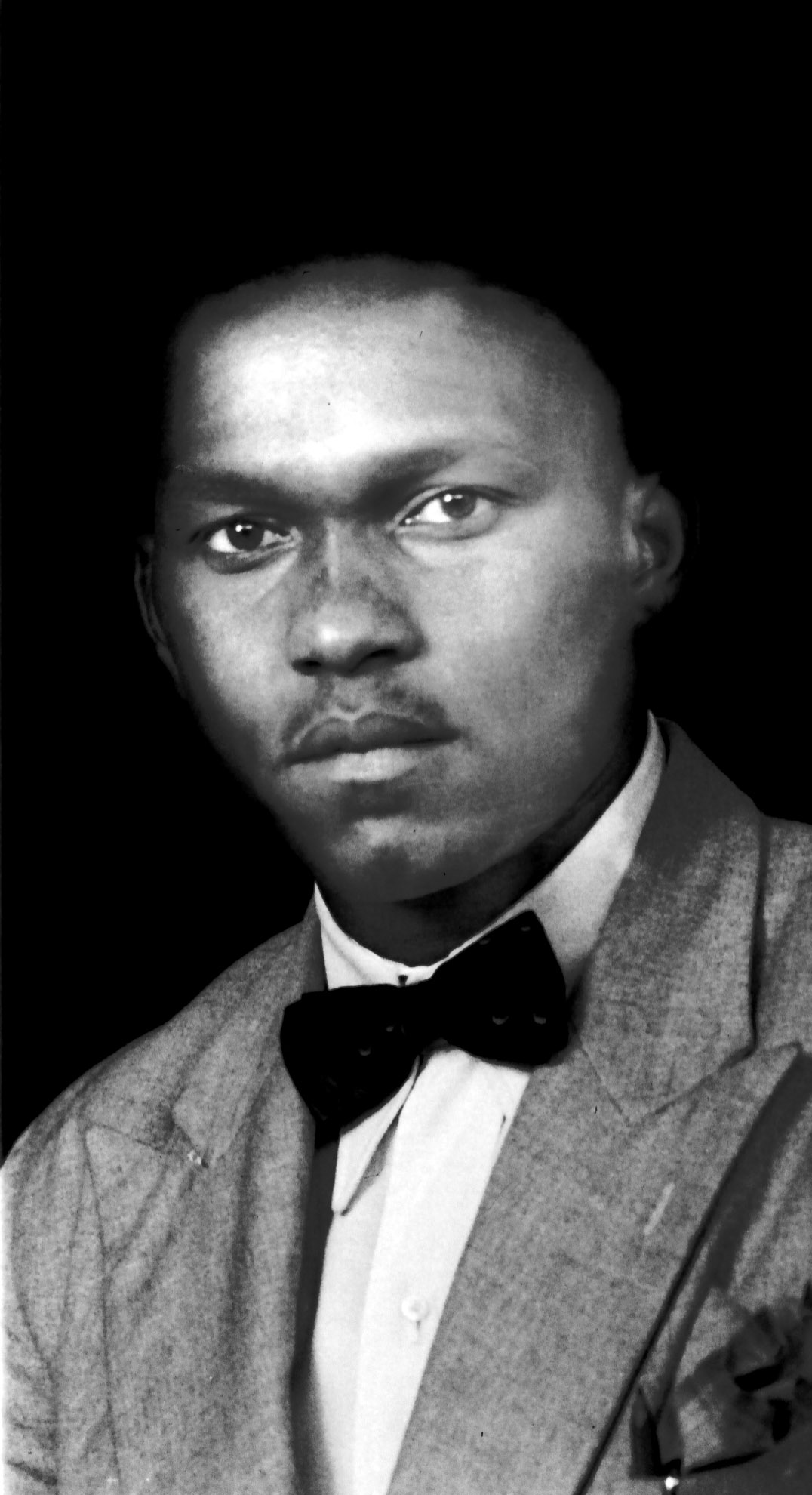
Paul Ngei in Nairobi in 1949

The Honourable Paul Joseph Ngei (18 October 1923 – 15 August 2004) was a Kenyan politician who was imprisoned for his role in the anti-colonial movement, but who went on to hold several government ministerial positions after Kenya became independent.

== Early life ==
Ngei was born at Kiima Kimwe near Machakos township, Kenya. He was the grandson of paramount chief Masaku after whom the town and the district were named. The family moved from Kiima Kimwe to a new settlement at Kangundo Division in a small village called Mbilini in 1929. This was a mountainous area with good rainfall for agriculture. His father had been converted to Christianity by the Africa Inland Mission.

Ngei attended primary school at DEB Kangundo from 1932, intermediate school at Kwa Mating'i in Machakos town from 1936, and Alliance High School in Kiambu District. He then joined the army in the King's African Rifles (KAR) for a four-year stint. After that he enrolled at Makerere University in Uganda as a journalism student from 1948 to 1950.

== Anti-colonial activism ==
The anti-colonial movement gathered momentum in Kenya in the 1940s. A political upsurge led to the Mau Mau rebellion, which involved several tribes: the Luos, Nandis, Maasai, Kamba, Kikuyus, Merus and Embu.

The declaration of a state of emergency in October 1952 led to the arrest of Ngei, Jomo Kenyatta and others. Ngei earned Kenyatta's undying friendship when, during their imprisonment in Lodwar, Ngei physically stopped a colonial jailer from beating up Kenyatta by seizing the whip and challenging the jailer to beat him (Ngei) first. The "Kapenguria Six" included Fred Kubai, Bildad Kaggia, Achieng Oneko and Kung'u Karumba. The last surviving member, Oneko, died on 9 June 2007. Mashujaa Day, which until recently was known as Kenyatta Day, is a national holiday in Kenya held every year to commemorate the detention of the six on 20 October 1952.

They were released nine years later, in 1961, two years before Kenya gained independence. The following year Ngei established the African People's Party.

Ngei's history generates much interest when examined within the context of these post-World War II protest politics that eventually ushered in independence for Kenya. These were protest politics characterised by party politics and violence as was manifested by the Mau Mau rebellion. Ngei lived and actively participated in both of these facets of Kenya's historical trajectory.

He came from the Akamba people of Kenya, who were the driving force behind a political protest against the British in 1937 led by Samuel Muindi Mbingu.

== Government positions ==
Ngei was the Kangundo Constituency MP from 1969 to 1990. He served throughout the Jomo Kenyatta government from 1964 to 1978 as a cabinet minister and in the post-Kenyatta government led by President Daniel arap Moi from 1978 to 1990 where he held several ministerial positions. In 1990 he was ruled bankrupt by court and consequently had to give up his parliamentary seat.

== Funeral ==
Ngei died in August 2004 at the age of 81 after suffering from diabetes. A mausoleum was built in Mbilini, Kangundo, the constituency he had served for 27 years, by the Kenyan government and unveiled in 2006. On 20 October 2016, the president of the Republic of Kenya unveiled a statue in honour of Paul Ngei at Chumvi town which is in the junction that leads to Machakos from the Mombasa Highway. This was during the celebrations of the year's Heroes' Day which were held in Machakos. The Jubilee Government committed to have national days celebrated outside the capital, Nairobi.
