= Rarieda Constituency =

Electoral constituency in Kenya

Rarieda
- constituency for the Parliament of Kenya
- Rarieda Constituency within Siaya County

- Siaya County within Kenya
- County: Siaya County
- Population: 134,558 (2013)

Current constituency
- Created: 1988
- Number of members: 1
- Party: ODM
- Member of Parliament: Otiende Amollo
- Created from: Bondo
- Wards: 5

Rarieda is an electoral constituency in Kenya. The constituency was establishment in 1988 from the eastern portion of Bondo Constituency. It is one of six constituencies in Siaya County, and one of two constituencies in the former Bondo District. The entire constituency is located within the now defunct Bondo County Council.

The majority of the population belong to the Luo community and speak the Luo language.

== Members of Parliament ==
Elections	MP	Party	Notes
1988	Bob Francis Jalang'o	KANU	One-party system.
1992	Achieng Oneko	Ford-Kenya	
1997	George Odeny Ngure	NDP	
2002	Raphael Tuju	NARC	
2007	Nicholas Gumbo	ODM	
2013	Nicholas Gumbo	ODM	
2017	Paul Otiende Amollo	ODM	
2022	Paul Otiende Amollo	ODM	

== Wards ==
Wards
Ward	Registered Voters
West Asembo	7,480
East Asembo	6,378
Uyoma East	10,372
Uyoma West	11,038
Uyoma North	8,403
Total	43,671
*September 2005.
