= History of Kenya =

A part of Eastern Africa, the territory of what is known as Kenya has seen human habitation since the beginning of the Lower Paleolithic. The Bantu expansion from a West African centre of dispersal reached the area by the 1st millennium AD. With the borders of the modern state at the crossroads of the Bantu, Nilo-Saharan and Afro-Asiatic ethno-linguistic areas of Africa, Kenya is a multi-ethnic state. The Wanga Kingdom was formally established in the late 17th century. The Kingdom covered from the Jinja in Uganda to Naivasha in the East of Kenya. This is the first time the Wanga people and Luhya tribe were united and led by a centralized leader, a king, known as the Nabongo.

The European and Arab presence in Mombasa dates back to the Early Modern period, but European exploration of the interior began in the 19th century. The British Empire established the East Africa Protectorate in 1895, from 1920 known as the Kenya Colony.

During the wave of decolonisation in the 1960s, Kenya gained independence from the United Kingdom in 1963, had Elizabeth II as its first head of state, and Jomo Kenyatta as its Prime Minister. It became a republic in 1964, and was ruled as a de facto one-party state by the Kenya African National Union (KANU), led by Kenyatta from 1964 to 1978. Kenyatta was succeeded by Daniel arap Moi, who ruled until 2002. Moi attempted to transform the de facto one-party status of Kenya into a de jure status during the 1980s. However, with the end of the Cold War, the practices of political repression and torture that had been "overlooked" by the Western powers as necessary evils in the effort to contain communism were no longer tolerated in Kenya.

Moi came under pressure, notably from US ambassador Smith Hempstone, to restore a multi-party system, which he did by 1991. Moi won elections in 1992 and 1997, which were overshadowed by politically motivated killings on both sides. During the 1990s, evidence of Moi's involvement in human rights abuses and corruption, such as the Goldenberg scandal, was uncovered. He was constitutionally barred from running in the 2002 election, which was won by Mwai Kibaki. Widely reported electoral fraud on Kibaki's side in the 2007 elections resulted in the 2007–2008 Kenyan crisis. Kibaki was succeeded by Uhuru Kenyatta in the 2013 general election. There were allegations that his rival Raila Odinga actually won the contest; however, the Supreme Court, through a thorough review of evidence adduced, found no malpractice during the conduct of the 2013 general election both from the IEBC and the Jubilee Party of Uhuru Kenyatta. Uhuru was re-elected in office five years later in 2017. His victory was, however, controversial. The supreme court had vitiated Uhuru's win after Raila Odinga disputed the result through a constitutionally allowed supreme court petition. Raila Odinga would later boycott a repeat election ordered by the court, allowing Uhuru Kenyatta sail through almost unopposed with 98% of the vote ( 50+1%).

== Paleolithic ==
Fossils found in Kenya have shown that primates inhabited the area for more than 20 million years. In 1929, the first evidence of the presence of ancient early human ancestors in Kenya was discovered when Louis Leakey unearthed one million year old Acheulian handaxes at the Kariandusi Prehistoric Site in southwest Kenya. Subsequently, many species of early hominid have been discovered in Kenya. The oldest, found by Martin Pickford in 2000, is the six million year old Orrorin tugenensis, named after the Tugen Hills where it was unearthed. It is the second oldest fossil hominid in the world after Sahelanthropus tchadensis.

In 1995, Meave Leakey named a new species of hominid Australopithecus anamensis following a series of fossil discoveries near Lake Turkana in 1965, 1987 and 1994. It is around 4.1 million years old.

In 2011, 3.2 million year old stone tools were discovered at Lomekwi near Lake Turkana - these are the oldest stone tools found anywhere in the world and pre-date the emergence of Homo.

One of the most famous and complete hominid skeletons ever discovered was the 1.6-million-year-old Homo erectus known as Nariokotome Boy, which was found by Kamoya Kimeu in 1984 on an excavation led by Richard Leakey.

The oldest Acheulean tools ever discovered anywhere in the world are from West Turkana, and were dated in 2011 through the method of magnetostratigraphy to about 1.76 million years old.

East Africa, including Kenya, is one of the earliest regions where modern humans (Homo sapiens) are believed to have lived. Evidence was found in 2018, dating to about 320,000 years ago, at the Kenyan site of Olorgesailie, of the early emergence of modern behaviors including: long-distance trade networks (involving goods such as obsidian), the use of pigments, and the possible making of projectile points. It is observed by the authors of three 2018 studies on the site, that the evidence of these behaviors is approximately contemporary to the earliest known Homo sapiens fossil remains from Africa (such as at Jebel Irhoud and Florisbad), and they suggest that complex and modern behaviors had already begun in Africa around the time of the emergence of Homo sapiens. Further evidence of modern behavior was found in 2021 when evidence of Africa's earliest funeral was found. A 78,000-year-old Middle Stone Age grave of a three-year-old child was discovered in Panga ya Saidi cave. Researchers said the child's head appeared to have been laid on a pillow. The body had been laid in a fetal position. Michael Petraglia, a professor of human evolution and prehistory at the Max Planck Institute said, “It is the oldest human burial in Africa. It tells us something about our cognition, our sociality, and our behaviors and they are all very familiar to us today.”

== Neolithic ==
The first inhabitants of present-day Kenya were hunter-gatherer groups, akin to the modern Khoisan speakers. The Kansyore culture, dating from the mid 5th millennium BCE to the 1st millennium BCE was one of East Africa's earliest ceramic producing group of hunter-gatherers. This culture was located at Gogo falls in Migori county near Lake Victoria. Kenya's rock art sites date between 2000BCE and 1000 CE. This tradition thrived at Mfangano Island, Chelelemuk hills, Namoratunga and Lewa Downs. The rock paintings are attributed to the Twa people, a hunter-gatherer group that was once widespread in East Africa. For the most part, these communities were assimilated into various food-producing societies that began moving into Kenya from the 3rd millennium BCE.

Linguistic evidence points to a relative sequence of population movements into Kenya that begins with the entry into northern Kenya of a possibly Southern Cushitic speaking population around the 3rd millennium BCE. They were pastoralists who kept domestic stock, including cattle, sheep, goat, and donkeys. Remarkable megalithic sites from this time period include the possibly archaeoastronomical site Namoratunga on the west side of Lake Turkana. One of these megalithic sites, Lothagam North Pillar Site, is East Africa's earliest and largest monumental cemetery. At least 580 bodies are found in this well planned cemetery. By 1000 BCE and even earlier, pastoralism had spread into central Kenya and northern Tanzania. Eburran hunter gatherers, who had lived in the Ol Doinyo Eburru volcano complex near Lake Nakuru for thousands of years, start adopting livestock around this period.

In present times the descendants of the Southern Cushitic speakers are located in north central Tanzania near Lake Eyasi. Their past distribution, as determined by the presence of loanwords in other languages, encompasses the known distribution of the Highland Savanna Pastoral Neolithic culture.

Beginning around 700 BCE, Southern Nilotic speaking communities whose homelands lay somewhere near the common border between Sudan, Uganda, Kenya and Ethiopia moved south into the western highlands and Rift Valley region of Kenya.

The arrival of the Southern Nilotes in Kenya occurred shortly before the introduction of iron to East Africa. The past distribution of the Southern Nilotic speakers, as inferred from place names, loan words and oral traditions includes the known distribution of Elmenteitan sites.

== Iron Age ==
Evidence suggests that autochthonous Iron production developed in West Africa as early as 3000–2500 BCE. The ancestors of Bantu speakers migrated in waves from west/central Africa to populate much of Eastern, Central, and Southern Africa from the first millennium BC. They brought with them iron forging technology and novel farming techniques as they migrated and integrated with the societies they encountered. The Bantu expansion is thought to have reached western Kenya around 1000 BCE.

The Urewe culture is one of Africa's oldest iron smelting centers. Dating from 550 BCE to 650 BCE, this culture dominated the Great Lakes region including Kenya. Sites in Kenya include Urewe, Yala, and Uyoma in northern Nyanza. By the first century BC, Bantu-speaking communities in the Great lakes region developed iron forging techniques that enabled them to produce carbon steel.

Later migrations through Tanzania led to settlement on the Kenyan coast. Archaeological findings have shown that by 100 BCE to 300 AD, Bantu-speaking communities were present at the coastal areas of Misasa in Tanzania, Kwale in Kenya. These communities also integrated and intermarried with the communities already present on the coast. Between 300 AD-1000 AD, through participation in the long-existing Indian Ocean trade route, these communities established links with Arabian and Indian traders leading to the development of the Swahili culture.

Historians estimate that in the 15th century, Southern Luo speakers started migrating to Western Kenya. The Luo descend from migrants closely related to other Nilotic Luo Peoples (especially the Acholi and Padhola people) who moved from South Sudan through Uganda into western Kenya in a slow and multi-generational manner between the 15th and 20th centuries. As they moved into Kenya and Tanzania, they underwent significant genetic and cultural admixture as they encountered other communities that were long established in the region.

The walled settlement of Thimlich Ohinga is the largest and best preserved of 138 sites containing 521 stone structures that were built around the Lake Victoria region in Nyanza Province. Carbon dating and linguistic evidence suggest that the site is at least 550 years old. Archaeological and ethnographic analysis of the site taken with historical, linguistic, and genetic evidence suggests that the populations that built, maintained, and inhabited the site at various phases had significant ethnic admixture.

== Swahili culture and trade ==
Swahili people inhabit the Swahili coast which is the coastal area of the Indian Ocean in Southeast Africa. It includes the coastal areas of Southern Somalia, Kenya, Tanzania and Northern Mozambique with numerous islands, cities and towns including Sofala, Kilwa, Zanzibar, Comoros, Mombasa, Gede, Malindi, Pate Island and Lamu. The Swahili coast was historically known as Azania in the Greco-Roman era and as Zanj or Zinj in Middle Eastern, Chinese and Indian literature from the 7th to the 14th century. The Periplus of the Erythrean Sea is a Graeco-Roman manuscript that was written in the first century AD. It describes the East African coast (Azania) and a long existing Indian Ocean Trade route. The East African Coast was long inhabited by hunter-gatherer and Cushitic groups since at least 3000BC. Evidence of indigenous pottery and agriculture dating as far back as this period has been found along the coast and offshore islands. International trade goods including Graeco-Roman pottery, Syrian glass vessels, Sassanian pottery from Persia and glass beads dating to 600BC have been found at the Rufiji River delta in Tanzania. The oldest indigenous inhabitants of the Kenyan coast are the Cushitic-speaking peoples, including the Orma, Boni, Sanye, and Somali, who were later displaced by Bantu-speaking groups, now forming the Mijikenda, Pokomo, Taita, and Swahili clusters.

Bantu Groups had migrated to the Great Lakes Region by 1000BCE. Some Bantu speakers continued to migrate further southeast towards the East African Coast. These Bantu speakers mixed with the local inhabitants they encountered at the coast. The earliest settlements in the Swahili coast to appear on the archaeological record are found at Kwale in Kenya, Misasa in Tanzania and Ras Hafun in Somalia. The Kenyan coast had hosted communities of ironworkers and communities of Eastern Bantu subsistence-farmers, hunters and fishers who supported the economy with agriculture, fishing, metal production and trade with outside areas. Between 300AD – 1000AD Azanian and Zanj settlements in the Swahili coast continued to expand with local industry and international trade flourishing. Between 500 and 800 A.D. they shifted to a sea-based trading economy and began to migrate south by ship. In the following centuries, trade in goods from the African interior, such as gold, ivory, and slaves stimulated the development of market towns such as Mogadishu, Shanga, Kilwa, and Mombasa. These communities formed the earliest city-states in the region which were collectively known to the Roman Empire as "Azania".

By the 1st century CE, many of the settlements such as those in Mombasa, Malindi, and Zanzibar - began to establish trade relations with Arabs. This led ultimately to the increased economic growth of the Swahili, the introduction of Islam, Arabic influences on the Swahili Bantu language, and cultural diffusion. Islam rapidly spread across Africa between 614AD – 900AD. Starting with the first Hijrah (migration) of Prophet Muhammad's followers to Ethiopia, Islam spread across Eastern, Northern and Western Africa. The Swahili city-states became part of a larger trade network. Many historians long believed that Arab or Persian traders established the city-states, but archeological evidence has led scholars to recognize the city-states as an indigenous development which, though subjected to foreign influence due to trade, retained a Bantu cultural core. The Azanian and Zanj communities had a high degree of intercultural exchange and admixture. This fact is reflected in the language, culture and technology present at the coast. For instance, between 630AD - 890AD, Archaeological evidence indicates that crucible steel was manufactured at Galu, south of Mombasa. Metallurgical analysis of iron artefacts indicates that the techniques used by the inhabitants of the Swahili coast combined techniques used in other African sites as well as those in West and South Asian sites. The Swahili City States begin to emerge from pre-existing settlements between 1000AD and 1500AD. The earliest gravestone found at Gedi Ruins dates to the earlier part of this period. The oldest Swahili texts in existence also date to this period. They were written in old Swahili script (Swahili-Arabic alphabet) based on Arabic letters. This is the script found on the earliest gravestones.

One of the most travelled people of the ancient world, Moroccan explorer Ibn Battuta, visited Mombasa on his way to Kilwa in 1331. He describes Mombasa as a large island with banana, lemon and citron trees. The local residents were Sunni Muslims who he described as “religious people, trustworthy and righteous.” He noted that their mosques were made of wood and were expertly built. Another ancient traveller, Chinese Admiral Zheng He visited Malindi in 1418. Some of his ships are reported to have sunk near Lamu Island. Recent genetic tests done on local inhabitants confirmed that some residents had Chinese ancestry.

Swahili, a Bantu language with many Arabic loan words, developed as a lingua franca for trade between the different peoples. A Swahili culture developed in the towns, notably in Pate, Malindi, and Mombasa. The impact of Arabic and Persian traders and immigrants on the Swahili culture remains controversial. During the Middle Ages,

the East African Swahili coast [including Zanzibar] was a wealthy and advanced region, which consisted of many autonomous merchant cities. Wealth flowed into the cities via the Africans' roles as intermediaries and facilitators of Indian, Persian, Arab, Indonesian, Malaysian, African and Chinese merchants. All of these peoples enriched the Swahili culture to some degree. The Swahili culture developed its own written language; the language incorporated elements from different civilisations, with Arabic as its strongest quality. Some Arab settlers were rich merchants who, because of their wealth, gained power—sometimes as rulers of coastal cities.

== Portuguese and Omani influences ==
Portuguese explorers appeared on the East African coast at the end of the 15th century. The Portuguese did not intend to found settlements, but to establish naval bases that would give Portugal control over the Indian Ocean. After decades of small-scale conflict, Arabs from Oman defeated the Portuguese in Kenya.

The Portuguese became the first Europeans to explore the region of current-day Kenya: Vasco da Gama visited Mombasa in April 1498. Da Gama's voyage successfully reached India (May 1498), and this initiated direct maritime Portuguese trade links with South Asia, thus challenging older trading networks over mixed land and sea routes, such as the spice-trade routes that utilised the Persian Gulf, Red Sea and caravans to reach the eastern Mediterranean. (The Republic of Venice had gained control over much of the trade between Europe and Asia. Especially after the Ottoman Turks captured Constantinople in 1453, Turkish control of the eastern Mediterranean inhibited the use of traditional land-routes between Europe and India. Portugal hoped to use the sea route pioneered by da Gama to bypass political, monopolistic and tariff barriers.)

Portuguese rule in East Africa focused mainly on a coastal strip centred in Mombasa. The Portuguese presence in East Africa officially began after 1505, when a naval force under the command of Dom Francisco de Almeida conquered Kilwa, an island located in the south-east of present-day Tanzania.

The Portuguese presence in East Africa served the purpose of controlling trade within the Indian Ocean and securing the sea routes linking Europe and Asia. Portuguese naval vessels disrupted the commerce of Portugal's enemies within the western Indian Ocean, and the Portuguese demanded high tariffs on items transported through the area, given their strategic control of ports and of shipping lanes. The construction of Fort Jesus in Mombasa in 1593 aimed to solidify Portuguese hegemony in the region. The Omani Arabs posed the most direct challenge to Portuguese influence in East Africa, besieging Portuguese fortresses. Omani forces captured Fort Jesus in 1698, only to lose it in a revolt (1728), but by 1730 the Omanis had expelled the remaining Portuguese from the coasts of present-day Kenya and Tanzania. By this time the Portuguese Empire had already lost interest in the spice-trade sea-route because of the decreasing profitability of that traffic. (Portuguese-ruled territories, ports and settlements remained active to the south, in Mozambique, until 1975.)

Under Seyyid Said (ruled 1807–1856), the Omani sultan who moved his capital to Zanzibar in 1840, the Arabs set up long-distance trade-routes into the African interior. The dry reaches of the north were lightly inhabited by semi-nomadic pastoralists. In the south, pastoralists and cultivators bartered goods and competed for land as long-distance caravan routes linked them to the Kenyan coast on the east and to the kingdoms of Uganda on the west. Arab, Shirazi and coastal African cultures produced an Islamic Swahili people trading in a variety of up-country commodities, including slaves.

== 19th-century history ==
Omani Arab colonisation of the Kenyan and Tanzanian coasts brought the once independent city-states under closer foreign scrutiny and domination than was experienced during the Portuguese period. Like their predecessors, the Omani Arabs were primarily able only to control the coastal areas, not the interior. However, the creation of plantations, intensification of the slave trade and movement of the Omani capital to Zanzibar in 1839 by Seyyid Said consolidated the Omani power in the region. The slave trade had begun to grow exponentially starting at the end of the 17th Century with a large slave market based at Zanzibar. When Sultan Seyyid Said moved his capital to Zanzibar, the already large clove and spice plantations continued to grow, driving demand for slaves. Slaves were sourced from the hinterland. Slave caravan routes into the interior of Kenya reached as far as the foothills of Mount Kenya, Lake Victoria and past Lake Baringo into Samburu country.

Arab governance of all the major ports along the East African coast continued until British interests aimed particularly at securing their 'Indian Jewel' and creation of a system of trade among individuals began to put pressure on Omani rule. By the late 19th century, the slave trade on the open seas had been completely strangled by the British. The Omani Arabs had no interest in resisting the Royal Navy's efforts to enforce anti-slavery directives. As the Moresby Treaty demonstrated, whilst Oman sought sovereignty over its waters, Seyyid Said saw no reason to intervene in the slave trade, as the main customers for the slaves were Europeans. As Farquhar in a letter made note, only with the intervention of Said would the European Trade in slaves in the Western Indian Ocean be abolished. As the Omani presence continued in Zanzibar and Pemba until the 1964 revolution, but the official Omani Arab presence in Kenya was checked by German and British seizure of key ports and creation of crucial trade alliances with influential local leaders in the 1880s. Nevertheless, the Omani Arab legacy in East Africa is currently found through their numerous descendants found along the coast that can directly trace ancestry to Oman and are typically the wealthiest and most politically influential members of the Kenyan coastal community.

The first Christian mission was founded on 25 August 1846, by Dr. Johann Ludwig Krapf, a German sponsored by the Church Missionary Society of England. He established a station among the Mijikenda at Rabai on the coast. He later translated the Bible into Swahili. Many freed slaves rescued by the British Navy are settled here. The peak of the slave plantation economy in East Africa was between 1875 – 1884. It is estimated that between 43,000 – 47,000 slaves were present on the Kenyan coast, which made up 44 percent of the local population. In 1874, Frere Town settlement in Mombasa was established. This was another settlement for freed slaves rescued by the British Navy. Despite pressure from the British to stop the East African slave trade, it continued to persist into the early 20th century.

By 1850 European explorers had begun mapping the interior. Three developments encouraged European interest in East Africa in the first half of the 19th century. First, was the emergence of the island of Zanzibar, located off the east coast of Africa. Zanzibar became a base from which trade and exploration of the African mainland could be mounted. By 1840, to protect the interests of the various nationals doing business in Zanzibar, consul offices had been opened by the British, French, Germans and Americans. In 1859, the tonnage of foreign shipping calling at Zanzibar had reached 19,000 tons. By 1879, the tonnage of this shipping had reached 89,000 tons. The second development spurring European interest in Africa was the growing European demand for products of Africa including ivory and cloves. Thirdly, British interest in East Africa was first stimulated by their desire to abolish the slave trade. Later in the century, British interest in East Africa would be stimulated by German competition.

== British rule (1895–1963) ==
=== East Africa Protectorate ===
In 1895, the British government took over and claimed the interior as far west as Lake Naivasha; it set up the East Africa Protectorate. The border was extended to Uganda in 1902, and in 1920 the enlarged protectorate, except for the original coastal strip, which remained a protectorate, became a crown colony. With the beginning of colonial rule in 1895, the Rift Valley and the surrounding Highlands became reserved for whites. In the 1920s Indians objected to the reservation of the Highlands for Europeans, especially British war veterans. The whites engaged in large-scale coffee farming dependent on mostly Kikuyu labour. Bitterness grew between the Indians and the Europeans.

This area's fertile land has always made it the site of migration and conflict. There were no significant mineral resources—none of the gold or diamonds that attracted so many to South Africa.

Imperial Germany set up a protectorate over the Sultan of Zanzibar's coastal possessions in 1885, followed by the arrival of Sir William Mackinnon's British East Africa Company (BEAC) in 1888, after the company had received a royal charter and concessionary rights to the Kenya coast from the Sultan of Zanzibar for a 50-year period. Incipient imperial rivalry was forestalled when Germany handed its coastal holdings to Britain in 1890, in exchange for German control over the coast of Tanganyika. The colonial takeover met occasionally with some strong local resistance: Waiyaki Wa Hinga, a Kikuyu chief who ruled Dagoretti who had signed a treaty with Frederick Lugard of the BEAC, having been subject to considerable harassment, burnt down Lugard's fort in 1890. Waiyaki was abducted two years later by the British and killed.

Following severe financial difficulties of the British East Africa Company, the British government on 1 July 1895 established direct rule through the East African Protectorate, subsequently opening (1902) the fertile highlands to white settlers.

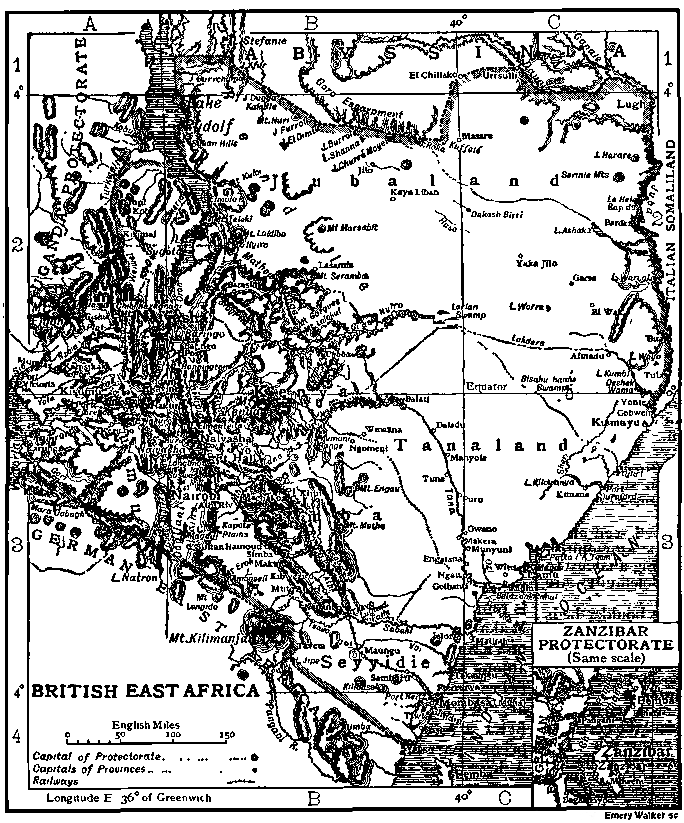
1911 map

A key to the development of Kenya's interior was the construction, started in 1895, of a railway from Mombasa to Kisumu, on Lake Victoria, completed in 1901. This was to be the first piece of the Uganda Railway. The British government had decided, primarily for strategic reasons, to build a railway linking Mombasa with the British protectorate of Uganda. A major feat of engineering, the "Uganda railway" (that is the railway inside Kenya leading to Uganda) was completed in 1903 and was a decisive event in modernising the area. As governor of Kenya, Sir Percy Girouard was instrumental in initiating railway extension policy that led to construction of the Nairobi-Thika and Konza-Magadi railways.

Some 32,000 workers were imported from British India to do the manual labour. About 7,000 settled, some 2,500 died of disease, and some 23,000 returned to India. During the construction of the railway, many Indian traders and small businessmen immigrated, seeing opportunity in the opening up of the interior of Kenya. According to one account, nearly all major Kenyan towns except Kisumu were originally founded by Somali traders. Rapid economic development was seen as necessary to make the railway pay, and since the African population was accustomed to subsistence rather than export agriculture, the government decided to encourage European settlement in the fertile highlands, which had small African populations. The railway opened up the interior, not only to the European farmers, missionaries and administrators, but also to systematic government programmes to attack slavery, witchcraft, disease and famine. The Africans saw witchcraft as a powerful influence on their lives and frequently took violent action against suspected witches. To control this, the British colonial administration passed laws, beginning in 1909, which made the practice of witchcraft illegal. These laws gave the local population a legal, nonviolent way to stem the activities of witches.

By the time the railway was built, military resistance by the African population to the original British takeover had petered out. However new grievances were being generated by the process of European settlement. Governor Percy Girouard is associated with the debacle of the Second Maasai Agreement of 1911, which led to their forceful removal from the fertile Laikipia plateau to semi-arid Ngong. To make way for the Europeans (largely Britons and whites from South Africa), the Maasai were restricted to the southern Loieta plains in 1913. The Kikuyu claimed some of the land reserved for Europeans and continued to feel that they had been deprived of their inheritance.

In the initial stage of colonial rule, the administration relied on traditional communicators, usually chiefs. When colonial rule was established and efficiency was sought, partly because of settler pressure, newly educated younger men were associated with old chiefs in local Native Councils.

In building the railway the British had to confront strong local opposition, especially from Koitalel Arap Samoei, a diviner and Nandi leader who prophesied that a black snake would tear through Nandi land spitting fire, which was seen later as the railway line. For ten years he fought against the builders of the railway line and train. The settlers were partly allowed in 1907 a voice in government through the legislative council, a European organisation to which some were appointed and others elected. But since most of the powers remained in the hands of the Governor, the settlers started lobbying to transform Kenya in a Crown Colony, which meant more powers for the settlers. They obtained this goal in 1920, making the Council more representative of European settlers; but Africans were excluded from direct political participation until 1944, when the first of them was admitted in the council.

==== First World War ====
Kenya became a military base for the British in the First World War (1914–1918), as efforts to subdue the German colony to the south were frustrated. At the outbreak of war in August 1914, the governors of British East Africa (as the Protectorate was generally known) and German East Africa agreed a truce in an attempt to keep the young colonies out of direct hostilities. However Lt Col Paul von Lettow-Vorbeck took command of the German military forces, determined to tie down as many British resources as possible. Completely cut off from Germany, von Lettow conducted an effective guerilla warfare campaign, living off the land, capturing British supplies, and remaining undefeated. He eventually surrendered in Zambia eleven days after the Armistice was signed in 1918. To chase von Lettow the British deployed Indian Army troops from India and then needed large numbers of porters to overcome the formidable logistics of transporting supplies far into the interior by foot. The Carrier Corps was formed and ultimately mobilised over 400,000 Africans, contributing to their long-term politicisation.

=== Kenya Colony ===
An early anti-colonial movement opposed to British rule known as Mumboism took root in South Nyanza in the early 20th century. Colonial authorities classified it as a millennialist cult. It has since been recognised as an anti-colonial movement. In 1913, Onyango Dunde of central Kavirondo proclaimed to have been sent by the serpent god of Lake Victoria, Mumbo to spread his teachings. The colonial government recognised this movement as a threat to their authority because of the Mumbo creed. Mumbo pledged to drive out the colonialists and their supporters and condemned their religion. Violent resistance against the British had proven to be futile as the Africans were outmatched technologically. This movement therefore focused on anticipating the end of colonialism, rather than actively inducing it. Mumboism spread amongst Luo people and Kisii people. The Colonial authorities suppressed the movement by deporting and imprisoning adherents in the 1920s and 1930s. It was officially banned in 1954 following the Mau Mau rebellion.

The first stirrings of modern African political organisation in Kenya Colony sought to protest pro-settler policies, increased taxes on Africans and the despised kipande (Identifying metal band worn around the neck). Before the war, African political focus was diffuse. But after the war, problems caused by new taxes and reduced wages and new settlers threatening African land led to new movements. The experiences gained by Africans in the war coupled with the creation of the white-settler-dominated Kenya Crown Colony, gave rise to considerable political activity. Ishmael Ithongo called the first mass meeting in May 1921 to protest African wage reductions. Harry Thuku formed the Young Kikuyu Association (YKA) and started a publication called Tangazo which criticised the colonial administration and missions. The YKA gave a sense of nationalism to many Kikuyu and advocated civil disobedience. The YKA gave way to the Kikuyu Association (KA) which was the officially recognised tribal body with Harry Thuku as its secretary. Through the KA, Thuku advocated for African suffrage. Deeming it unwise to base a nationalist movement around one tribe, Thuku renamed his organisation the East African Association and strived for multi-ethnic membership by including the local Indian community and reaching out to other tribes. The colonial government accused Thuku of sedition, arrested him and detained him until 1930.

In Kavirondo (later Nyanza province), a strike at a mission school, organised by Daudi Basudde, raised concerns about the damaging implications on African land ownership by switching from the East African Protectorate to the Kenyan Colony. A series of meetings dubbed ‘Piny Owacho’ (Voice of the People) culminated in a large mass meeting held in December 1921 advocating for individual title deeds, getting rid of the kipande system and a fairer tax system. Archdeacon W. E. Owen, an Anglican missionary and prominent advocate for African affairs, formalised and canalised this movement as the president of the Kavirondo Taxpayers Welfare Association. Bound by the same concerns, James Beauttah initiated an alliance between the Kikuyu and Luo communities.

In the mid-1920s, the Kikuyu Central Association (KCA) was formed. Led by Joseph Keng’ethe and Jesse Kariuki, it picked up from Harry Thuku's East African Association except that it represented the Kikuyu almost exclusively. Jomo Kenyatta was the secretary and editor of the associations’ publication Mugwithania (The unifier). The KCA focused on unifying the Kikuyu into one geographic polity, but its project was undermined by controversies over ritual tribute, land allocation and the ban on female circumcision. They also fought for the release of Harry Thuku from detention. Upon Thuku's release, he was elected president of the KCA. The government banned the KCA after World War II began when Jesse Kariuki compared the compulsory relocation of Kikuyus who lived near white owned land to Nazi policies on compulsory relocation of people.

Most political activity between the wars was local, and this succeeded most among the Luo of Kenya, where progressive young leaders became senior chiefs. By the later 1930s government began to intrude on ordinary Africans through marketing controls, stricter educational supervision and land changes. Traditional chiefs became irrelevant and younger men became communicators by training in the missionary churches and civil service. Pressure on ordinary Kenyans by governments in a hurry to modernise in the 1930s to 1950s enabled the mass political parties to acquire support for "centrally" focused movements, but even these often relied on local communicators.

During the early part of the 20th century, the interior central highlands were settled by British and other European farmers, who became wealthy farming coffee and tea. By the 1930s, approximately 15,000 white settlers lived in the area and gained a political voice because of their contribution to the market economy. The area was already home to over a million members of the Kikuyu tribe, most of whom had no land claims in European terms, and lived as itinerant farmers. To protect their interests, the settlers banned the growing of coffee, introduced a hut tax and the landless were granted less and less land in exchange for their labour. A massive exodus to the cities ensued as their ability to provide a living from the land dwindled.

==== Representation ====
Kenya became a focus of resettlement of young, upper class British officers after the war, giving a strong aristocratic tone to the white settlers. If they had £1,000 in assets they could get a free 1,000 acres (4 km^{2}); the goal of the government was to speed up modernisation and economic growth. They set up coffee plantations, which required expensive machinery, a stable labour force, and four years to start growing crops. The veterans did escape democracy and taxation in Britain, but they failed in their efforts to gain control of the colony. The upper class bias in migration policy meant that whites would always be a small minority. Many of them left after independence.

Power remained concentrated in the governor's hands; weak legislative and executive councils made up of official appointees were created in 1906. The European settlers were allowed to elect representatives to the Legislative Council in 1920, when the colony was established. The white settlers, 30,000 strong, sought "responsible government," in which they would have a voice. They opposed similar demands by the far more numerous Indian community. The European settlers gained representation for themselves and minimised representation on the Legislative Council for Indians and Arabs. The government appointed a European to represent African interests on the council. In the "Devonshire declaration" of 1923 the Colonial Office declared that the interests of the Africans (comprising over 95% of the population) must be paramount—achieving that goal took four decades. Historian Charles Mowat explained the issues:

[The Colonial Office in London ruled that] native interests should come first; but this proved difficult to apply [in Kenya] ... where some 10,000 white settlers, many of them ex-officers of the war, insisted that their interests came before those of the three million natives and 23,000 Indians in the colony, and demanded 'responsible government', provided that they alone bore the responsibility. After three years of bitter dispute, provoked not by the natives but by the Indians, vigorously backed by the Government of India, the Colonial Office gave judgment: the interest of the natives was 'paramount', and responsible government out of the question, but no drastic change was contemplated – thus in effect preserving the ascendancy of the settlers.

==== Second World War ====
In the Second World War (1939–1945) Kenya became an important British military base for successful campaigns against Italy in the Italian Somaliland and Ethiopia. The war brought money and an opportunity for military service for 98,000 men, called "askaris". The war stimulated African nationalism. After the war, African ex-servicemen sought to maintain the socioeconomic gains they had accrued through service in the King's African Rifles (KAR). Looking for middle class employment and social privileges, they challenged existing relationships within the colonial state. For the most part, veterans did not participate in national politics, believing that their aspirations could best be achieved within the confines of colonial society. The social and economic connotations of KAR service, combined with the massive wartime expansion of Kenyan defence forces, created a new class of modernised Africans with distinctive characteristics and interests. These socioeconomic perceptions proved powerful after the war.

==== Rural trends ====
British officials sought to modernise Kikuyu farming in the Murang'a District 1920–1945. Relying on concepts of trusteeship and scientific management, they imposed a number of changes in crop production and agrarian techniques, claiming to promote conservation and "betterment" of farming in the colonial tribal reserves. While criticised as backward by British officials and white settlers, African farming proved resilient and Kikuyu farmers engaged in widespread resistance to the colonial state's agrarian reforms.

Modernisation was accelerated by the Second World War. Among the Luo the larger agricultural production unit was the patriarch's extended family, mainly divided into a special assignment team led by the patriarch, and the teams of his wives, who, together with their children, worked their own lots on a regular basis. This stage of development was no longer strictly traditional, but still largely self-sufficient with little contact with the broader market. Pressures of overpopulation and the prospects of cash crops, already in evidence by 1945, made this subsistence economic system increasingly obsolete and accelerated a movement to commercial agriculture and emigration to cities. The Limitation of Action Act in 1968 sought to modernise traditional land ownership and use; the act has produced unintended consequences, with new conflicts raised over land ownership and social status.

As Kenya modernized after the war, the role of the British religious missions changed their roles, despite the efforts of the leadership of the Church Missionary Society to maintain the traditional religious focus. However the social and educational needs were increasingly obvious, and the threat of the Mau Mau uprisings pushed the missions to emphasize medical, humanitarian and especially educational programs. Fundraising efforts in Britain increasingly stressed the non-religious components. Furthermore, the imminent transfer of control to the local population became a high priority.

==== Kenya African Union ====
As a reaction to their exclusion from political representation, the Kikuyu people, the most subject to pressure by the settlers, founded in 1921 Kenya's first African political protest movement, the Young Kikuyu Association, led by Harry Thuku. After the Young Kikuyu Association was banned by the government, it was replaced by the Kikuyu Central Association in 1924.

In 1944 Thuku founded and was the first chairman of the multi-tribal Kenya African Study Union (KASU), which in 1946 became the Kenya African Union (KAU). It was an African nationalist organization that demanded access to white-owned land. KAU acted as a constituency association for the first black member of Kenya's legislative council, Eliud Mathu, who had been nominated in 1944 by the governor after consulting élite African opinion. The KAU remained dominated by the Kikuyu ethnic group. However, the leadership of KAU was multitribal. Wycliff Awori was the first vice president followed by Tom Mbotela. In 1947 Jomo Kenyatta, former president of the moderate Kikuyu Central Association, became president of the more aggressive KAU to demand a greater political voice for Africans. In an effort to gain nationwide support of KAU, Jomo Kenyatta visited Kisumu in 1952. His effort to build up support for KAU in Nyanza inspired Oginga Odinga, the Ker (chief) of the Luo Union (an organisation that represented members of the Luo community in East Africa) to join KAU and delve into politics.

In response to the rising pressures, the British Colonial Office broadened the membership of the Legislative Council and increased its role. By 1952 a multiracial pattern of quotas allowed for 14 European, 1 Arab, and 6 Asian elected members, together with an additional 6 Africans and 1 Arab member chosen by the governor. The council of ministers became the principal instrument of government in 1954. In 1952, Princess Elizabeth and her husband Prince Philip were on holiday at the Treetops Hotel in Kenya when her father, King George VI, died in his sleep. Elizabeth cut short her trip and returned home immediately to assume the throne. She was crowned Queen Elizabeth II at Westminster Abbey in 1953 and as British hunter and conservationist Jim Corbett (who accompanied the royal couple) put it, she went up a tree in Africa a princess and came down a queen.

==== Mau-Mau Uprising ====
A key watershed came from 1952 to 1956, during the Mau Mau Uprising, an armed local movement directed principally against the colonial government and the European settlers. It was the largest and most successful such movement in British Africa. Members of the forty group, World War II(WW2) veterans, including Stanley Mathenge, Bildad Kaggia and Fred Kubai became core leaders in the rebellion. Their experiences during the WW2 awakened their political consciousness, giving them determination and confidence to change the system. Key leaders of KAU known as the Kapenguria six were arrested on the 21st of October. They include Jomo Kenyatta, Paul Ngei, Kungu Karumba, Bildad Kaggia, Fred Kubai and Achieng Oneko. Kenyatta denied he was a leader of the Mau Mau but was convicted at trial and was sent to prison in 1953, gaining his freedom in 1961.

An intense propaganda campaign by the colonial government effectively discouraged other Kenyan communities, settlers and the international community from sympathising with the movement by emphasising on real and perceived acts of barbarism perpetrated by the Mau Mau. Although a much smaller number of Europeans died compared to Africans during the uprising, each individual European loss of life was publicised in disturbing detail, emphasising elements of betrayal and bestiality. As a result, the protest was supported almost exclusively by the Kikuyu, despite issues of land rights and anti-European, anti-Western appeals designed to attract other groups. The Mau Mau movement was also a bitter internal struggle among the Kikuyu. Harry Thuku said in 1952, "To-day we, the Kikuyu, stand ashamed and looked upon as hopeless people in the eyes of other races and before the Government. Why? Because of the crimes perpetrated by Mau Mau and because the Kikuyu have made themselves Mau Mau." That said, other Kenyans directly or indirectly supported the movement. Notably, Pio Gama Pinto, a Kenyan of Goan descent, facilitated the provision of firearms to forest fighters. He was arrested in 1954 and detained until 1959. Another notable example was the pioneering lawyer Argwings Kodhek, the first East African to obtain a law degree. He became known as the Mau Mau lawyer as he would successfully defend Africans accused of Mau Mau crimes pro bono. 12,000 militants were killed during the suppression of the rebellion, and the British colonial authorities also implemented policies involving the incarceration of over 150,000 suspected Mau Mau members and sympathizers (mostly from the Kikuyu people) into concentration camps. In these camps, the colonial authorities also used various forms of torture to attempt information from the detainees. In 2011, after decades of waiting, thousands of secret documents from the British Foreign Office were declassified. They show that the Mau Mau rebels were systematically tortured and subjected to the most brutal practices, men were castrated and sand introduced into their anus, women were raped after introducing boiling water into their vaginas. The Foreign Office archives also reveal that this was not the initiative of soldiers or colonial administrators but a policy orchestrated from London.

The Mau Mau uprising set in play a series of events that expedited the road to Kenya's Independence. A Royal Commission on Land and Population condemned the reservation of land on a racial basis. To support its military campaign of counter-insurgency the colonial government embarked on agrarian reforms that stripped white settlers of many of their former protections; for example, Africans were for the first time allowed to grow coffee, the major cash crop. Thuku was one of the first Kikuyu to win a coffee licence, and in 1959 he became the first African board member of the Kenya Planters Coffee Union. The East African Salaries Commission put forth a recommendation – 'equal pay for equal work' – that was immediately accepted. Racist policies in public places and hotels were eased. John David Drummond, 17th Earl of Perth and Minister of State for Colonial affairs stated: "The effort required to suppress Mau Mau destroyed any settlers illusions that they could go it alone; the British Government was not prepared for the shedding of [more] blood in order to preserve colonial rule."

==== Trade Unionism and the struggle for independence ====
The pioneers of the trade union movement were Makhan Singh, Fred Kubai and Bildad Kaggia. In 1935, Makhan Singh started the Labour trade union of Kenya. In the 1940s, Fred Kubai started the Transport and Allied Workers Union and Bildad Kaggia founded the Clerks and Commercial Workers Union. In 1949, Makhan Singh and Fred Kubai started the East African Trade Union Congress. They organised strikes including the railway workers strike in 1939 and the protest against granting of a Royal Charter to Nairobi in 1950. These pioneering trade union leaders were imprisoned during the crackdown on Mau Mau. Following this crackdown, all national African political activity was banned. This ban was in place even when the first African members of the legislative council (MLCs) were elected. To manage and control African political activity, the colonial government permitted district parties starting in 1955. This effectively prevented African unity by encouraging ethnic affiliation. Trade unions led by younger Africans filled the vacuum created by the crackdown as the only organisations that could mobilise the masses when political parties were banned.

The Kenya Federation of Registered Trade Unions (KFRTU) was started by Aggrey Minya in 1952 but was largely ineffective. Tom Mboya was one of the young leaders who stepped into the limelight. His intelligence, discipline, oratory and organisational skills set him apart. After the colonial government declared a state of emergency on account of Mau Mau, at age 22, Mboya became the Director of Information of KAU. After KAU was banned, Mboya used the KFRTU to represent African political issues as its Secretary General at 26 years of age. The KFRTU was backed by the western leaning International Confederation of Free Trade Unions (ICFTU). Tom Mboya then started the Kenya Federation of Labour (KFL) in place of KFRTU, which quickly became the most active political body in Kenya, representing all the trade unions. Mboya's successes in trade unionism earned him respect and admiration. Mboya established international connections, particularly with labour leaders in the United States of America through the ICFTU. He used these connections and his international renown to counter moves by the colonial government.

Several trade union leaders who were actively involved in the independence struggle through KFL would go on to join active politics becoming members of parliament and cabinet ministers. These include Arthur Aggrey Ochwada, Dennis Akumu, Clement Lubembe and Ochola Ogaye Mak'Anyengo. The trade union movement would later become a major battlefront in the proxy Cold War that would engulf Kenyan politics in the 1960s.

==== Constitutional Debates and the Path to Independence ====
After the suppression of the Mau Mau rising, the British provided for the election of the six African members to the Legislative Council (MLC) under a weighted franchise based on education. Mboya successfully stood for office in the first election for African MLCs in 1957, beating the previously nominated incumbent, Argwings Kodhek. Daniel Arap Moi was the only previously nominated African MLC who kept his seat. Oginga Odinga was also elected and shortly afterwards nominated as the first chairman of the African elected members. Mboya's party, the Nairobi People's Convention Party (NPCP), was inspired by Kwame Nkurumah's People's Convention Party. It became the most organised and effective political party in the country. The NPCP was used to effectively mobilise the masses in Nairobi in the struggle for greater African representation on the council. The new colonial constitution of 1958 increased African representation, but African nationalists began to demand a democratic franchise on the principle of "one man, one vote." However, Europeans and Asians, because of their minority position, feared the effects of universal suffrage.

In June 1958, Oginga Odinga called for the release of Jomo Kenyatta. This call built momentum and was taken up by the NPCP. Agitation for African suffrage and self-rule picked up in pace. One major hindrance to self-rule was the lack of African human capital. Poor education, economic development and a lack of African technocrats were a real problem. This inspired Tom Mboya to begin a programme conceptualised by a close confidante Dr. Blasio Vincent Oriedo, funded by Americans, of sending talented youth to the United States for higher education. There was no university in Kenya at the time, but colonial officials opposed the programme anyway. The next year Senator John F. Kennedy helped fund the programme, hence its popular name – The Kennedy Airlift. This scholarship program trained some 70% of the top leaders of the new nation, including the first African woman to win the Nobel Peace Prize, environmentalist Wangari Maathai and Barack Obama's father, Barack Obama Sr.

At a conference held in 1960 in London, agreement was reached between the African members and the British settlers of the New Kenya Group, led by Michael Blundell. However many whites rejected the New Kenya Group and condemned the London agreement, because it moved away from racial quotas and toward independence. Following the agreement a new African party, the Kenya African National Union (KANU), with the slogan "Uhuru," or "Freedom," was formed under the leadership of Kikuyu leader James S. Gichuru and labour leader Tom Mboya. KANU was formed in May 1960 when the Kenya African Union (KAU) merged with the Kenya Independence Movement (KIM) and Nairobi People's Convention Party (NPCP). Mboya was a major figure from 1951 until his death in 1969. He was praised as nonethnic or antitribal, and attacked as an instrument of Western capitalism. Mboya as General Secretary of the Kenya Federation of Labour and a leader in the Kenya African National Union before and after independence skilfully managed the tribal factor in Kenyan economic and political life to succeed as a Luo in a predominantly Kikuyu movement. A split in KANU produced the breakaway rival party, the Kenya African Democratic Union (KADU), led by Ronald Ngala and Masinde Muliro. In the elections of February 1961, KANU won 19 of the 33 African seats while KADU won 11 (twenty seats were reserved by quota for Europeans, Asians and Arabs). Kenyatta was finally released in August and became president of KANU in October.

== Independence ==
In 1962, a KANU-KADU coalition government, including both Kenyatta and Ngala, was formed. The 1962 constitution established a bicameral legislature consisting of a 117-member House of Representatives and a 41-member Senate. The country was divided into 7 semi-autonomous regions, each with its own regional assembly. The quota principle of reserved seats for non-Africans was abandoned, and open elections were held in May 1963. KADU gained control of the assemblies in the Rift Valley, Coast and Western regions. KANU won majorities in the Senate and House of Representatives, and in the assemblies in the Central, Eastern and Nyanza regions. Kenya now achieved internal self-government with Jomo Kenyatta as its first president. The British and KANU agreed, over KADU protests, to constitutional changes in October 1963 strengthening the central government thus ensuring that Kenya would be a de facto single-party state. Kenya attained independence on 12 December 1963 as the Commonwealth realm of Kenya and was declared a republic on 12 December 1964 with Jomo Kenyatta as Head of State. In 1964 constitutional changes further centralised the government and various state organs were formed. One of the key state organs was the Central Bank of Kenya which was established in 1966.

The British government bought out the white settlers and they mostly left Kenya. The Indian minority dominated retail business in the cities and most towns, but was deeply distrusted by the Africans. As a result, 120,000 of the 176,000 Indians kept their old British passports rather than become citizens of an independent Kenya; large numbers left Kenya, most of them headed to Britain.

=== Kenyatta tenure (1963–1978) ===
1973 newsreel about Kenyatta's rule

Once in power, Kenyatta swerved from radical nationalism to conservative bourgeois politics. The plantations formerly owned by white settlers were broken up and given to farmers, with the Kikuyu the favoured recipients, along with their allies the Embu and the Meru. By 1978, most of the country's wealth and power was in the hands of the organisation which grouped these three tribes: the Kikuyu-Embu-Meru Association (GEMA), together comprising 30% of the population. At the same time the Kikuyu, with Kenyatta's support, spread beyond their traditional territorial homelands and repossessed lands "stolen by the whites" – even when these had previously belonged to other groups. The other groups, a 70% majority, were outraged, setting up long-term ethnic animosities.

The minority party, the Kenya African Democratic Union (KADU), representing a coalition of small tribes that had feared dominance by larger ones, dissolved itself voluntarily in 1964 and former members joined KANU. KANU was the only party 1964–66 when a faction broke away as the Kenya People's Union (KPU). It was led by Jaramogi Oginga Odinga, a former vice-president and Luo elder. KPU advocated a more "scientific" route to socialism—criticising the slow progress in land redistribution and employment opportunities—as well as a realignment of foreign policy in favour of the Soviet Union. On 25 February 1965, Pio Gama Pinto, a Kenyan of Goan descent and freedom fighter who was detained during the colonial period was assassinated in what is recognised as Kenya's first political assassination. He was also Oginga Odinga's chief tactician and link to the eastern bloc. His death dealt a severe blow to the Oginga Odinga's organisational efforts.

The government used a variety of political and economic measures to harass the KPU and its prospective and actual members. KPU branches were unable to register, KPU meetings were prevented and civil servants and politicians suffered severe economic and political consequences for joining the KPU. A security Act was passed in Parliament in July 1966 and granted the government powers to carry out detention without trial, which was used against KPU members. In a series of dawn raids in August 1966, several KPU party members were arrested and detained without trial. They included Ochola Mak'Anyengo (the secretary general of the Kenya Petroleum Oil Workers Union), Oluande Koduol (Oginga Odinga's private secretary) and Peter Ooko (the general secretary of the East African Common Services Civil Servants Union).

In June 1969, Tom Mboya, a Luo member of the government considered a potential successor to Kenyatta, was assassinated. Hostility between Kikuyu and Luo was heightened, and after riots broke out in Luo country the KPU was banned. The specific riots that led to the banning of the KPU resulted in the incident referred to as the Kisumu massacre. Kenya thereby became a one-party state under KANU.

Ignoring his suppression of the opposition and continued factionalism within KANU the imposition of one-party rule allowed Mzee ("Old Man") Kenyatta, who had led the country since independence, to claim he had achieved "political stability." Underlying social tensions were evident, however. Kenya's very rapid population growth and considerable rural to urban migration were in larger part responsible for high unemployment and disorder in the cities. There also was much resentment by blacks at the privileged economic position held by Asians and Europeans in the country.

At Kenyatta's death (22 August 1978), Vice-president Daniel arap Moi became interim President. On 14 October, Moi formally became president after he was elected head of KANU and designated its sole nominee. In June 1982, the National Assembly amended the constitution, making Kenya officially a one-party state. On 1 August members of the Kenyan Air Force launched an attempted coup, which was quickly suppressed by Loyalist forces led by the Army, the General Service Unit (GSU) – paramilitary wing of the police – and later the regular police, but not without civilian casualties.

==== Foreign policies ====
Independent Kenya, although officially non-aligned, adopted a pro-Western stance. Kenya worked unsuccessfully for East African union; the proposal to unite Kenya, Tanzania and Uganda did not win approval. However, the three nations did form a loose East African Community (EAC) in 1967, that maintained the customs union and some common services that they had shared under British rule. The EAC collapsed in 1977 and was officially dissolved in 1984. Kenya's relations with Somalia deteriorated over the problem of Somalis in the North Eastern Province who tried to secede and were supported by Somalia. In 1968, however, Kenya and Somalia agreed to restore normal relations, and the Somali rebellion effectively ended.

=== Moi regime (1978–2002) ===
Kenyatta died in 1978 and was succeeded by Daniel Arap Moi (b. 1924, d. 2020) who ruled as President 1978–2002. Moi, a member of the Kalenjin ethnic group, quickly consolidated his position and governed in an authoritarian and corrupt manner. By 1986, Moi had concentrated all the power – and most of its attendant economic benefits – into the hands of his Kalenjin tribe and of a handful of allies from minority groups.

On 1 August 1982, lower-level air force personnel, led by Senior Private Grade-I Hezekiah Ochuka and backed by university students, attempted a coup d'état to oust Moi. The putsch was quickly suppressed by forces commanded by Army Commander Mahamoud Mohamed, a veteran Somali military official. In the coup's aftermath, some of Nairobi's poor Kenyans attacked and looted stores owned by Asians. Robert Ouko, the senior Luo in Moi's cabinet, was appointed to expose corruption at high levels, but was murdered a few months later. Moi's closest associate was implicated in Ouko's murder; Moi dismissed him but not before his remaining Luo support had evaporated. Germany recalled its ambassador to protest the "increasing brutality" of the regime and foreign donors pressed Moi to allow other parties, which was done in December 1991 through a constitutional amendment.

On the heels of the Garissa massacre of 1980, Kenyan troops committed the Wagalla massacre in 1984 against thousands of civilians in the North Eastern Province. An official probe into the atrocities was later ordered in 2011.

==== Multi-party politics ====
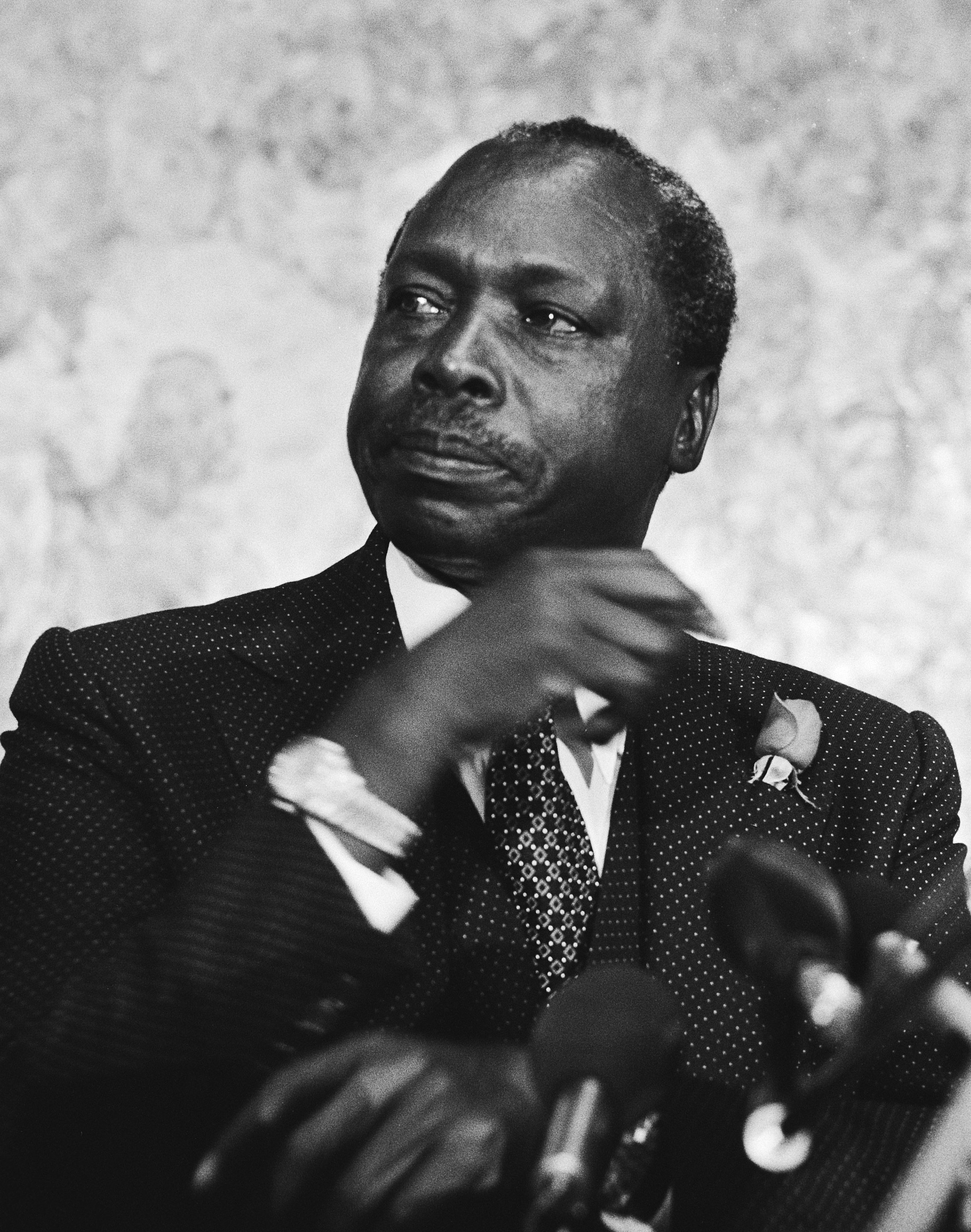
President Daniel arap Moi in 1979

After local and foreign pressure, in December 1991, parliament repealed the one-party section of the constitution. The first multiparty elections were held in 1992.

The Forum for the Restoration of Democracy (FORD) emerged as the leading opposition to KANU, and dozens of leading KANU figures switched parties. But FORD, led by Oginga Odinga (1911–1994), a Luo, and Kenneth Matiba, a Kikuyu, split into two ethnically based factions. In the first open presidential elections in a quarter century, in December 1992, Moi won with 37% of the vote, Matiba received 26%, Mwai Kibaki (of the mostly Kikuyu Democratic Party) 19%, and Odinga 18%. In the Assembly, KANU won 97 of the 188 seats at stake. Moi's government in 1993 agreed to economic reforms long urged by the World Bank and the International Monetary Fund, which restored enough aid for Kenya to service its $7.5 billion foreign debt.

Obstructing the press both before and after the 1992 elections, Moi continually maintained that multiparty politics would only promote tribal conflict. His own regime depended upon exploitation of inter-group hatreds. Under Moi, the apparatus of clientage and control was underpinned by the system of powerful provincial commissioners, each with a bureaucratic hierarchy based on chiefs (and their police) that was more powerful than the elected members of parliament. Elected local councils lost most of their power, and the provincial bosses were answerable only to the central government, which in turn was dominated by the president. The emergence of mass opposition in 1990–91 and demands for constitutional reform were met by rallies against pluralism. The regime leaned on the support of the Kalenjin and incited the Maasai against the Kikuyu. Government politicians denounced the Kikuyu as traitors, obstructed their registration as voters and threatened them with dispossession. In 1993 and after, mass evictions of Kikuyu took place, often with the direct involvement of army, police and game rangers. Armed clashes and many casualties, including deaths, resulted.

Further liberalisation in November 1997 allowed the expansion of political parties from 11 to 26. President Moi won re-election as president in the December 1997 elections, and his KANU Party narrowly retained its parliamentary majority.

Moi ruled using a strategic mixture of ethnic favouritism, state repression and marginalisation of opposition forces. He utilised detention and torture, looted public finances and appropriated land and other property. Moi sponsored irregular army units that attacked the Luo, Luhya and Kikuyu communities, and he denied his responsibility by attributing the violence to ethnic clashes arising from land dispute. Beginning in 1998, Moi engaged in a carefully calculated strategy to manage the presidential succession in his and his party's favour. Faced with the challenge of a new, multiethnic political coalition, Moi shifted the axis of the 2002 electoral contest from ethnicity to the politics of generational conflict. The strategy backfired, ripping his party wide open and resulting in the humiliating defeat of its candidate, Kenyatta's son, in the December 2002 general elections.

=== Recent history (2002 to present) ===
==== 2002 elections ====
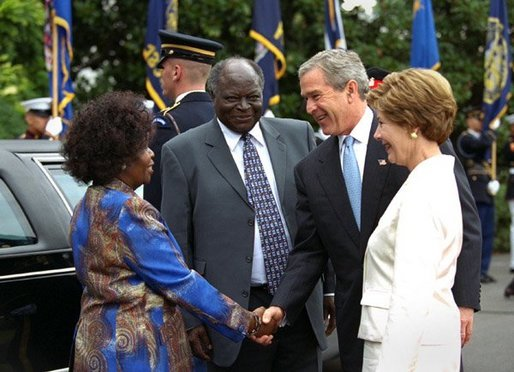
Mwai Kibaki and (the late) Mrs. Lucy Kibaki with US President George W. Bush and Mrs. Laura Bush at the White House during a state visit in 2003.

Constitutionally barred from running in the December 2002 presidential elections, Moi unsuccessfully promoted Uhuru Kenyatta, the son of Kenya's first President, as his successor. A rainbow coalition of opposition parties routed the ruling KANU party, and its leader, Moi's former vice-president Mwai Kibaki, was elected president by a large majority.

On 27 December 2002, by 62% the voters overwhelmingly elected members of the National Rainbow Coalition (NaRC) to parliament and NaRC candidate Mwai Kibaki (b. 1931) to the presidency. Voters rejected the Kenya African National Union's (KANU) presidential candidate, Uhuru Kenyatta, the handpicked candidate of outgoing president Moi. International and local observers reported the 2002 elections to be generally more fair and less violent than those of both 1992 and 1997. His strong showing allowed Kibaki to choose a cabinet, to seek international support and to balance power within the NaRC.

==== Economic trends ====
Kenya witnessed a spectacular economic recovery, helped by a favourable international environment. The annual rate of growth improved from −1.6% in 2002 to 2.6% by 2004, 3.4% in 2005, and 5.5% in 2007. However, social inequalities also increased; the economic benefits went disproportionately to the already well-off (especially to the Kikuyu); corruption reached new depths, matching some of the excesses of the Moi years. Social conditions deteriorated for ordinary Kenyans, who faced a growing wave of routine crime in urban areas; pitched battles between ethnic groups fighting for land; and a feud between the police and the Mungiki sect, which left over 120 people dead in May–November 2007 alone.

==== 2007 elections and ethnic violence ====
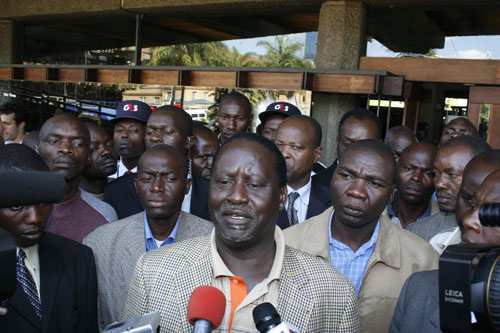
Orange Democratic Movement leader Prime Minister Omolo Odinga speaking with the Kenyan media.

Once regarded as the world's "most optimistic," Kibaki's regime quickly lost much of its power because it became too closely linked with the discredited Moi forces. The continuity between Kibaki and Moi set the stage for the self-destruction of Kibaki's National Rainbow Coalition, which was dominated by Kikuyus. The western Luo and Kalenjin groups, demanding greater autonomy, backed Raila Amolo Odinga (1945– ) and his Orange Democratic Movement (ODM).

In the December 2007 elections, Odinga, the candidate of the ODM, attacked the failures of the Kibaki regime. The ODM charged the Kikuyu with having grabbed everything and all the other tribes having lost; that Kibaki had betrayed his promises for change; that crime and violence were out of control, and that economic growth was not bringing any benefits to the ordinary citizen. In the December 2007 elections the ODM won majority seats in Parliament, but the presidential elections votes were marred by claims of rigging by both sides. It may never be clear who won the elections, but it was roughly 50:50 before the rigging started.

"Majimboism" was a philosophy that emerged in the 1950s, meaning federalism or regionalism in Swahili, and it was intended to protect local rights, especially regarding land ownership. Today "majimboism" is code for certain areas of the country to be reserved for specific ethnic groups, fuelling the kind of ethnic cleansing that has swept the country since the election. Majimboism has always had a strong following in the Rift Valley, the epicenter of the recent violence, where many locals have long believed that their land was stolen by outsiders. The December 2007 election was in part a referendum on majimboism. It pitted today's majimboists, represented by Odinga, who campaigned for regionalism, against Kibaki, who stood for the status quo of a highly centralised government that has delivered considerable economic growth but has repeatedly displayed the problems of too much power concentrated in too few hands – corruption, aloofness, favouritism and its flip side, marginalisation. In the town of Londiani in the Rift Valley, Kikuyu traders settled decades ago. In February 2008, hundreds of Kalenjin raiders poured down from the nearby scruffy hills and burned a Kikuyu school. Three hundred thousand members of the Kikuyu community were displaced from Rift Valley province. Kikuyus quickly took revenge, organising into gangs armed with iron bars and table legs and hunting down Luos and Kalenjins in Kikuyu-dominated areas like Nakuru. "We are achieving our own perverse version of majimboism," wrote one of Kenya's leading columnists, Macharia Gaitho.

The Luo population of the southwest had enjoyed an advantageous position during the late colonial and early independence periods of the 1950s, 1960s and early 1970s, particularly in terms of the prominence of its modern elite compared to those of other groups. However the Luo lost prominence due to the success of Kikuyu and related groups (Embu and Meru) in gaining and exercising political power during the Jomo Kenyatta era (1963–1978). While measurements of poverty and health by the early 2000s showed the Luo disadvantaged relative to other Kenyans, the growing presence of non-Luo in the professions reflected a dilution of Luo professionals due to the arrival of others rather than an absolute decline in the Luo numbers.

==== Demographic trends ====
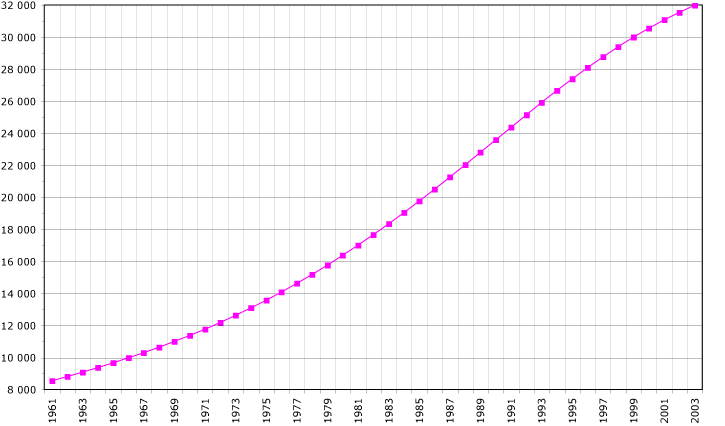
Kenya demography (1961–2003)

Between 1980 and 2000 total fecundity in Kenya fell by about 40%, from some eight births per woman to around five. During the same period, fertility in Uganda declined by less than 10%. The difference was due primarily to greater contraceptive use in Kenya, though in Uganda there was also a reduction in pathological sterility. The Demographic and Health Surveys carried out every five years show that women in Kenya wanted fewer children than those in Uganda and that in Uganda there was also a greater unmet need for contraception. These differences may be attributed, in part at least, to the divergent paths of economic development followed by the two countries since independence and to the Kenya government's active promotion of family planning, which the Uganda government did not promote until 1995.

==== Presidency of Uhuru Kenyatta (2013–2022) ====
After Kibaki's tenure ended in 2013, Kenya held its first general elections after the 2010 constitution had been passed. Uhuru Kenyatta won in a disputed election result, leading to a petition by the opposition leader, Raila Odinga. The supreme court upheld the election results and Kenyatta began his term with William Ruto as deputy president. Despite this ruling, the Supreme Court and the head of the Supreme Court were seen as powerful institutions that could check the powers of the president.

In 2017, Kenyatta won a second term in office in another disputed election. Odinga again petitioned the results in the Supreme Court, accusing the Independent Electoral and Boundaries Commission of mismanagement of the elections and Kenyatta and his party of rigging. The Supreme Court overturned the election results in what became a landmark ruling in Africa and one of the very few in the world in which the results of a presidential elections were annulled. This ruling solidified the position of the Supreme Court as an independent body. Consequently, Kenya had a second round of elections for the presidential position, in which Kenyatta emerged the winner after Odinga refused to participate, citing irregularities.

In March 2018, a historic handshake between Kenyatta and his longtime opponent Odinga signalled a period of reconciliation followed by economic growth and increased stability. Between 2019 and 2021, Kenyatta and Odinga combined efforts to promote major changes to the Kenyan constitution, labelled the "Building Bridges Initiative" (BBI), saying that their efforts were to improve inclusion and overcome the country's winner-take-all election system that often resulted in post-election violence. The BBI proposal called for broad expansion of the legislative and executive branches, including the creation of a prime minister with two deputies and an official leader of the opposition, reverting to selecting cabinet ministers from among the elected Members of Parliament, establishment of up to 70 new constituencies, and addition of up to 300 unelected members of Parliament (under an "affirmative action" plan).

Critics saw this as an unnecessary attempt to reward political dynasties and blunt the efforts of Deputy President William Ruto (Odinga's rival for the next presidency) and bloat the government at an exceptional cost to the debt-laded country. Ultimately, in May 2021, the Kenyan High Court ruled that the BBI constitutional reform effort was unconstitutional, because it was not truly a popular initiative, but rather an effort of the government. The court sharply criticized Kenyatta for the attempt, laying out grounds for his being sued, personally, or even impeached (though the Parliament, which had passed the BBI, was unlikely to do that). The ruling was seen as a major defeat for both Kenyatta (soon to leave office), and Odinga (expected to seek the presidency), but a boon to Odinga's future presidential-election rival, Ruto. On 20 August 2021, Kenya's Court of Appeal again upheld the High Court Judgment of May 2021, which was appealed by the BBI Secretariat.

==== Presidency of William Ruto (2022-) ====
In August 2022, Deputy President William Ruto narrowly won the presidential election. He took 50.5% of the vote. His main rival, Raila Odinga, got 48.8% of the vote. According to the Afrobarometer survey 67.9% of Kenyan citizens participated in the last election (2022) and 17.6% did not vote in the presidential election. On 13 September 2022, William Ruto was sworn in as Kenya's fifth president.

== See also ==
- Timeline of Kenya
- Leaders:
  - Colonial Heads of Kenya
  - Heads of Government of Kenya (12 December 1963 to 12 December 1964)
  - Heads of State of Kenya (12 December 1964 to today)
- Politics of Kenya
- History of cities in Kenya:
  - Mombasa history and timeline
  - Nairobi history and timeline
- History of Africa
- History of Uganda
- History of Tanzania
- List of human evolution fossils

== Bibliography ==
- Barsby J (2007). Kenya. Culture Smart!: a quick guide to customs and etiquette. London: Kuperard. ISBN 9781857333497.
- Haugerud A (1995). The Culture of Politics in Modern Kenya. African Studies. Vol. 84 (1st ed.). Cambridge: Cambridge University Press. p. 266. ISBN 9780521595902.
- Mwaura N (2005). Kenya Today: Breaking the Yoke of Colonialism in Africa. Algora Publishing. p. 238. ISBN 9780875863214.
- Parkinson T, Phillips M (2006). Kenya (6th ed.). Lonely Planet. ISBN 9781740597432.
- Trillo R, Jacobs D, Luckham N (2006). The Rough Guide to Kenya (8th ed.). London: Rough Guides. ISBN 9781843536512.
- Ogot, Bethwell A. (1967). History of the Southern Luo, Volume I: Migration and Settlement, 1500–1900. Peoples of East Africa. Nairobi: East African Publishing House.

=== History ===
- Anderson D (2005). Histories of the Hanged: The Dirty War in Kenya and the End of Empire (1st ed.). New York: W. W. Norton. ISBN 9780393059861.
- Berman B, Lonsdale J (1992). Unhappy Valley: Conflict in Kenya and Africa. Vol. 2. USA: Ohio University Press. ISBN 9780852550991.
- Branch, Daniel, and Nicholas Cheeseman. "The politics of control in Kenya: Understanding the bureaucratic-executive state, 1952–78." Review of African Political Economy 33.107 (2006): 11-31. [Branch, Daniel, and Nicholas Cheeseman. "The politics of control in Kenya: Understanding the bureaucratic-executive state, 1952–78." Review of African Political Economy 33.107 (2006): 11-31. online]
- Branch D (2011). Kenya. Between Hope and Despair, 1963–2011. New Haven, Connecticut: Yale University Press. ISBN 9780300148763.
- Bravman B (1998). Making ethnic ways: communities and their transformations in Taita, Kenya, 1800-1950. Oxford: James Currey. ISBN 0852556837.
- Collier P, Lal D (1986). Labour and Poverty in Kenya, 1900–1980. New York: Oxford University Press. ISBN 9780198285052.
- Eliot C (1905). The East Africa Protectorate. E. Arnold. OL 13518463M.
- Elkins C (2005). Imperial Reckoning: The Untold Story of Britain's Gulag in Kenya (1st ed.). New York: Holt Paperbacks. ISBN 9781844135486.
- Gatheru MR (2005). Kenya: From Colonization to Independence, 1888-1970. USA: McFarland & Co. ISBN 9780786421992.
- Gibbons A (2007). The First Human: The Race to Discover Our Earliest Ancestors. New York: Anchor Books. ISBN 9781400076963.
- Harper JC (2006). Asante M (ed.). Western Educated Elites in Kenya, 1900–1963: The African American Factor. African Studies. Routledge. ISBN 9780415977302.
- Kanogo T (2005). African Womanhood In Colonial Kenya: 1900-1950. Eastern African Studies (1st ed.). Ohio University Press. ISBN 9780821415689.
- Kanyinga K (2009). "The legacy of the white highlands: Land rights, ethnicity and the post-2007 election violence in Kenya". J. Contemp. Afr. Stud. 27 (3): 325–344. doi:10.1080/02589000903154834. S2CID 154527979.
- Kasper-Holtkotte C (2019). "They called us Bloody Foreigners." Jewish Refugees in Kenya, 1933 until the 1950s. Berlin/Leipzig, Germany: Hentrich & Hentrich. ISBN 978-3-95565-361-3.
- Kitching GN (1980). Class and Economic Change in Kenya: The Making of an African Petite-Bourgeoisie. Yale University Press. ISBN 9780300023855.
- Kyle K (1999). The Politics of the Independence of Kenya. UK: Palgrave Macmillan. doi:10.1057/9780230377707. ISBN 9780333760987.
- Lewis J (2000). Empire State-Building: War and Welfare in Kenya, 1925–52. Oxford: James Currey. ISBN 9780852557853.
- Lonsdale J, Berman B (1979). "Coping with the Contradictions: The Development of the Colonial State in Kenya, 1895-1914". J. Afr. Hist. 20 (4). Cambridge University Press: 487–505. doi:10.1017/S0021853700017503. JSTOR 181774.
- Mackenzie F (1998). Land, Ecology and Resistance in Kenya, 1880–1952. Edinburgh University Press. ISBN 9780748610211.
- Maloba WO (1993). Mau Mau and Kenya: An Analysis of a Peasant Revolt. Blacks in the Diaspora (1st ed.). Bloomington: Indiana University Press. ISBN 9780253336644.
- Maxon RM, Ofcansky TP (2000). Historical Dictionary of Kenya (2nd ed.). Lanham, Md.: Scarecrow Press. ISBN 9780810836167.
- Maxon RM (2003). Going Their Separate Ways: Agrarian Transformation in Kenya, 1930–1950. Madison, NJ: Fairleigh Dickinson University Press. ISBN 9780838638934 – via Questia.
- Miller NN, Yeager R (1994). Kenya: The Quest for Prosperity. Westview Press. ISBN 9780813382012.
- Mungeam GH (1966). British rule in Kenya, 1895-1912. Oxford: Clarendon Press. OCLC 418768.
- Ndege GO (2001). "Faces of Contact and Change". Health, State, and Society in Kenya. Rochester studies in African history and the diaspora. University of Rochester Press. ISBN 9781580460996. JSTOR 10.7722/j.ctt1bh2msr.
- Ochieng' WR, Maxon RM, eds. (1992). Economic History of Kenya. Nairobi, Kenya: East African Educational Publishers Ltd. ISBN 9789966469632. OCLC 655670874.
- Ochieng' WR, ed. (1991). Themes in Kenyan History. Ohio University Press. ISBN 9780821409770.
- Ochieng' WR, ed. (1989). A Modern History of Kenya: In Honour of Professor B. A. Ogot. Nairobi, Kenya: Evans Brothers. ISBN 9780237510824.
- Odhiambo A, Lonsdale J, eds. (2003). Mau Mau and Nationhood: Arms, Authority, and Narration. Athens, USA: Ohio University Press. ISBN 9780821414835.
- Odhiambo A (2006). "Ethnic Cleansing and Civil Society in Kenya 1969–1992". J. Contemp. Afr. Stud. 22 (1): 29–42. doi:10.1080/0258900042000179599. S2CID 153973377.
- Ogot BA, Ochieng WR, eds. (1995). Decolonization & Independence in Kenya, 1940-93. London: James Currey. ISBN 9780852557051.
- Ogot BA (1981). Historical dictionary of Kenya. African historical dictionaries. Vol. 29. Metuchen, N.J.: Scarecrow Press. ISBN 9780810814196. OCLC 7596161.
- Percox DA (2004). Britain, Kenya and the Cold War: Imperial Defence, Colonial Security and Decolonisation. International Library of African Studies. Vol. 13. London: I.B. Tauris. ISBN 9781850434603.
- Pinkney R (2001). The International Politics of East Africa. UK: Manchester University Press. ISBN 9780719056161. Compares Kenya, Uganda and Tanzania.
- Press RM (2006). Peaceful Resistance: Advancing Human Rights and Democratic Freedoms. Aldershot, UK: Ashgate Publishing Ltd. ISBN 9780754647133.
- Sabar G (2002). Church, State and Society in Kenya: From Mediation to Opposition, 1963–1993. London: Taylor & Francis Ltd. ISBN 9780714650777.
- Sandgren DP (2000). Christianity and the Kikuyu: Religious Divisions and Social Conflict (2nd ed.). USA: Peter Lang Publishing Inc. ISBN 9780820448671.
- Smith DL (2005). Kenya, the Kikuyu and Mau Mau. Herstmonceux, UK: Mawenzi Books. ISBN 9780954471323.
- Steinhart EI (2006). Black Poachers, White Hunters: A Social History of Hunting in Colonial Kenya. Oxford, UK: James Currey. ISBN 9780852559611.
- Tignor RL (1998). Capitalism and Nationalism at the End of Empire: State and Business in Decolonizing Egypt, Nigeria, and Kenya, 1945-1963. New Jersey, USA: Princeton University Press. ISBN 9780691015842.
- Wamagatta EN (2009). "British Administration and the Chiefs' Tyranny in Early Colonial Kenya: A Case Study of the First Generation of Chiefs from Kiambu District, 1895–1920". J. Asian Afr. Stud. 44 (4): 371–388. doi:10.1177/0021909609105090. S2CID 146279215. Argues that the chiefs' tyranny in early colonial Kenya had its roots in the British administrative style since the Government needed strong-handed local leaders to enforce its unpopular laws and regulations.
- van Zwanenberg R (1972). The agricultural history of Kenya to 1939. Historical Association of Kenya. Vol. 1. Nairobi: East African Publishing House. Archived from the original on 17 April 2022.
- Wolff RD (1974). Economics of Colonialism: Britain and Kenya, 1870–1930. USA: Yale University Press. ISBN 9780300016390.

== Primary sources ==
- Askwith T (1995). Lewis J (ed.). From Mau Mau to Harambee: Memoirs and Memoranda of Colonial Kenya. Vol. 17. Cambridge, UK: Cambridge University Press. ISBN 9780902993303. Archived from the original on 4 August 2020.
- Kareri CM (2003). Peterson DR (ed.). The Life of Charles Muhoro Kareri. Wisconsin African Studies Program. Translated by Muriithi JK. University of Wisconsin-Madison.
- Maathai WM (2006). Unbowed: A Memoir. Knopf. ISBN 9780307263483.
