= Trade unions in Kenya =

- National organization(s): COTU; TUC-Ke
- Regulatory authority: Ministry of Labour and Social Protection; Registrar of Trade Unions; Salaries and Remuneration Commission; Federation of Kenyan Employers
- Primary legislation: Employment Act of 2007

Global Rights Index
- 4 Systematic violations of rights

International Labour Organization
- Kenya is a member of the ILO

Convention ratification
- Freedom of Association: January 13 1964; 62 years ago
- Right to Organise: 1964; 62 years ago

Trade Unions are an important component of relations between employees and employers in the formal economy. This is especially so in public sector employment. Under the Constitution of Kenya, every person has the right to fair labour practices, which encompasses: fair remuneration, reasonable working conditions, the right to form, join or participate in the activities and programmes of a trade union, and the right to go on strike. Most trade unions in Kenya are affiliated to the Central Organization of Trade Unions, which has been the principal umbrella body for trade unions in Kenya since its inception in 1965.

== History ==
Trade union activity in Kenya began in earnest during British colonial rule, when organisers such as Makhan Singh founded the Labour Trade Union of Kenya in 1935. By the mid 1940s Fred Kubai had founded the Transport and Allied Workers Union, while Bildad Kaggia had founded the Clerks and Commercial Workers Union. These and several other unions were at the heart of the founding of the East African Trade Union Congress in 1949, and its successor, the Kenya Federation of Registered Trade Unions, which later rebranded into the Kenya Federation of Labour under the leadership of Tom Mboya. After Kenya gained independence in 1963, trade union activity consolidated under COTU, with Clement Lubembe appointed as its inaugural general secretary. Though allowed to exist, trade unions in Kenya struggled with the challenges of manipulation and control under the Kenya government, with instances like the Registrar of Trade Unions refusing to re-register the University Academic Staff Union, in 1993, on grounds that 'there was no provision for existence despite having previously registered it in 1972. However, since the adoption of the Employment Act of 2007, and the Constitution of Kenya, 2010, trade unions of Kenya have enjoyed much stronger protections from state interference as well as freedom to organise.
