= Anyango (surname) =

Anyango is a surname. Notable people with the surname include:

- Emmaculate Anyango (born 2000), Kenyan cross-country runner
- Jane Anyango (born 1970), Kenyan peace activist
- Pollyins Ochieng Anyango, Kenyan politician
