= Kenya African Workers Congress =

KAWC
- Kenya African Workers Congress
- Merged into: COTU
- Founded: 1964
- Dissolved: 1965
- Headquarters: Nairobi, Kenya
- Location: Kenya
- Key people: Dennis Akumu; Ochola Ogaye Mak'Anyengo
- Affiliations: AATUF
- Website: www.cotu-kenya.org

The Kenyan African Workers Congress was a short-lived trade union, formed by a faction of Kenyan trade unionists, with leftist leanings, to rival the Pro-West Kenya Federation of Labour, by Ochola Ogaye Mak'Anyengo and Dennis Akumu. The animosity between the KAWC and the KFL led to then-president Jomo Kenyatta, commissioning an inter-ministerial committee, headed by the Minister for Labour and Social ServicesEliud Ngala Mwendwa. This committee recommended the dissolution of the two unions and their merger into a single union led by KFL's Clement Lubembe and deputized by KAWC's Dennis Akumu.
