= Olajumoke Yacob-Haliso =

Nigerian academic

- Education: University of Ibadan
- Employer: Brandeis University
- Organization: African Studies Association (ASA), International Studies Association (ISA)
- Known for: Research, teaching and publishing books about issues affecting women in post-conflict Africa, refugees and international relations, and African politics

Olajumoke Yacob-Haliso is a Nigerian university professor whose work focuses on African women in post-conflict contexts; African refugees, gender and politics; democracy; and African politics. She has published multiple books on women's issues in Africa, an editor of the Journal of Contemporary African Studies and the Journal of International Politics and Development.

She is an Associate Professor of African and African-American Studies at Brandeis University, Waltham, USA, and has experience at many African, US, and European universities.

== Education ==
Yacob-Haliso has a PhD in political science from the University of Ibadan and she was an American Council of Learned Societies postdoctoral fellow at Rhodes University. She was also Global South Scholar-in-Residence at the Graduate Institute of International and Development Studies, Geneva.

== Career ==
Yacob-Haliso is associate professor of African and African American Studies at Brandeis University. Previously, she was a professor of political science at Babcock University where she was also the dean of the Veronica Adeleke School of Social Sciences, and head of the department of Political Science and Public Administration. Her work focuses on African women in post-conflict contexts; gender and politics; democracy; human rights; and refugee rights. She also served as co-Chair of the Feminist Theory and Gender Studies Section of the International Studies Association from 2020 to 2023.

She has served as the editor of the Journal of International Politics and Development; Editor-in-Chief of the Babcock Journal of the Social Sciences; and a co-editor of the Journal of Contemporary African Studies.. She also serves on the editorial board of African Affairs: Journal of the Royal Africa Society UK, International Feminist Journal of Politics, the Journal of International Women's Studies. She is series editor, with Toyin Falola, of the Africa: Past, Present and Prospects book series with Rowman and Littleton/ Lexington Publishers.

Yacob-Haliso has held numerous prestigious international fellowships including from the Harry Frank Guggenheim Foundation, New York; the American Council of Learned Societies; the University for Peace Africa Program & International Development Research Centre, Canada; the Graduate Institute for International Studies, Geneva; the Council for the Development of Social Science Research in Africa (CODESRIA); the African Studies Association Presidential Fellowship; American Political Science Association; African Association of Political Science; the African Studies Association-UK, and others.

She has been a visiting professor at Iowa State University, Yale University, and the University of Texas at Austin.

== Selected publications ==
Yacob-Haliso is the author, co-author, editor or co-editor of:

- Gendering Knowledge in Africa and the African Diaspora: Contesting History and Power, Routledge, 2019, ISBN 9780367888459
- Africa’s Big Men: Predatory State-Society Relations in Africa, Routledge, 2018, ISBN 9781138559349
- The Palgrave Handbook of African Women's Studies, Palgrave, 2021, ISBN 978-3030280987
- Gender, Culture and Development in Africa, 2017, Pan-African University Press, ISBN 978-1943533275
- Pentecostalism and Politics in Africa (African Histories and Modernities), Palgrave Macmillan, 2018, ISBN 978-3319749105
