= 1950s in Ghana =

Overview of Ghana-related events during the 1950s

1950s in Ghana details events of note that happened in Ghana in the years 1950 to 1959.

== Incumbents ==
- Prime Minister: Kwame Nkrumah from 1957 to 1960

== Events ==
- 1957 March - Ghana becomes independent with Kwame Nkrumah as prime minister.
- 1958, 5–13 December - Ghana hosts the first All-African Peoples' Conference
- 1959 - Ghana Academy of Arts and Sciences established

== National holidays ==
- January 1: New Year's Day
- March 6: Independence Day
- May 1: Labor Day
- December 25: Christmas
- December 26: Boxing Day

In addition, several other places observe local holidays, such as the founding of their towns. These are also "special days."
