= All-African Peoples' Conference =

1958 and 1961 meetings

The All-African Peoples' Conferences (AAPC) were a series of three conferences held between December 1958 and March 1961. In contrast to the First Conference of Independent African States, held in Accra, Ghana in April 1958, where only UN-recognised states were formally represented, attendees to the conferences were primarily representatives of independence movements and labour unions, as well as representatives from ethnic communities and other significant associations across the continent. Observer delegations from the United States, the Soviet Union, the People's Republic of China, and other countries also attended.

The conferences were conceived by Ghanaian Prime Minister Kwame Nkrumah and his advisor George Padmore in the tradition of the Pan-African Congress, which had last met in 1945 in Manchester. It represented the opinion that the end of European colonial rule was near, and in the words of the conference's Chairman the Kenyan Tom Mboya, that it was time for them to "scram from Africa."

The conference was open to "all national political parties and national trade union congresses or equivalent bodies or organizations that subscribe to the aims and objects of the conference." The conference met three times: December 1958, January 1960, and March 1961; and had a permanent secretariat with headquarters in Accra. Its primary objectives were independence for the colonies, strengthening of the independent states and resistance to neocolonialism. It tended to be more outspoken in its denunciations of colonialism than the Conference of Independent African States, a contemporary organisation which, being composed of heads of state, was relatively constrained by diplomatic caution. Immanuel Wallerstein described the conference as the "true successor to the Pan-African Congresses." The subject matter and attitudes of the conference are illustrated by the following excerpt from its second meeting:

The Conference

Demands the immediate and unconditional accession to independence of all the African peoples, and the total evacuation of the foreign forces of aggression and oppression stationed in Africa;
Proclaims the absolute necessity, in order to resist the imperialist coalition more effectively and rapidly free all the dependent peoples from foreign oppression, of coordinating and uniting the forces of all the Africans, and recommends the African states not to neglect any form of co-operation in the interest of all the African peoples;
Denounces vigorously the policy of racial discrimination applied by colonialist and race-conscious minorities in South and East and Central Africa, and demands the abolition of racial domination in South Africa, the suppression of the Federation of Nyasaland and Rhodesia, and the immediate independence of these countries;
Proclaims equality of rights for all the citizens of the free countries of Africa and the close association of the masses for the building up and administration of a free and prosperous Africa;
Calls on the peoples of Africa to intensify the struggle for independence, and insists on the urgent obligation on the independent nations of Africa to assure them of the necessary aid and support;...

== First Conference: Accra, 8–13 December 1958 ==
Accra Conference
- Host country: Ghana
- Date: December 8–13, 1958
- Participants: +300, including: Nkrumah Lumumba Kaunda Banda Roberto Diggs
- Chair: Tom Mboya

Key points

The first conference was preceded by a Preparatory Committee composed of representatives from the eight independent African states except South Africa. The conference itself was attended by delegates from 28 African countries and colonies. Over 300 delegates representing African political parties and trade unions attended, as well as delegates from Canada, China, Denmark, India, the Soviet Union, the United Kingdom, and the United States. Tom Mboya, General Secretary of the Kenya Federation of Labour, was elected chairman.

In his plenary, Mboya compared the conference to that of Berlin in 1884 and told the audience that Africans should control their own destiny, and pleaded to the US and Soviet Union to avoid dragging Africa into the Cold War. W. E. B. Du Bois also addressed the conference (as he was suffering from illness his wife read for him), saying that Pan Africanism "meant that each nation must relinquish part of its heritage for the good of the whole continent; in making such a sacrifice, the African people would lose nothing except their chains, and they would gain back their dignity."

One important discussion was over the legitimacy and desirability of using violence against the colonial powers. It was agreed that violence would be necessary in some cases. Concerning the struggle in Algeria, full support was given to the recently proclaimed Provisional Republican Government (Gouvernement Provisoire de la République Algérienne—GPRA). On the Cameroon War, the conference supported the fight of the UPC maquis, demanding full amnesty and UN-sponsored elections. The conference considered unity and solidarity to be key strategies in the fight against colonialism and economic domination after colonialism; it called for the establishment of Africa-wide organisations, including trade unions youth groups, and a Bureau of Liberatory Movements. It was at this meeting that the decision was made to establish a permanent secretariat at Accra. The first secretary-general was George Padmore, then living in Ghana. The following year, he died and was replaced by Guinea's Resident Minister in Ghana, Abdoulaye Diallo.

Prominent persons at the first conference included:

- Kwame Nkrumah, leader of the newly independent Ghana
- Patrice Lumumba, who headed the Congolese delegation
- Kenneth Kaunda of Zambia
- Hastings Banda of the Federation of Rhodesia and Nyasaland (and later President of Malawi)
- Holden Roberto, using the name Rui Ventura, of Angola

Slogans displayed by Ghanaians holding signs during the conference:

- "Hands Off Africa"
- "Africa Must Be Free"
- "Down With Imperialism and Colonialism"
- "We prefer independence with danger to servitude in tranquility"

Kwame Nkrumah in his closing speech emphasised the importance of an independent African community, and that Africa's economic and social reconstruction should be based on socialism. The conference had a massive impact on various independence movements, notably that of Patrice Lubumba, and imbued confidence. The conference also contributed to the formation of the Organisation of African Unity.

== Second Conference: Tunis, 25–30 January 1960 ==
One feature of the AAPC was tension between conservative and avant-garde elements. Neither Mboya nor Nkrumah, key leaders at the Accra Conference, attended the second conference in Tunis. The conference adopted a proposal by the Algerians and Moroccans for an "international corps of volunteers" to go to fight in Algeria in the manner of the International Brigade that had gone to Spain in the 1930s. The Algerian War of Independence was a primary focus of the conference. Participants in the Congress also joined with 200,000-plus Tunisians in a protest of France's atomic tests in the Sahara.

The conference voiced considerable concern over neocolonialism—the tendency of the nominally freed states to actually remain subjugated to the imperialist powers because of economic dependency and other factors. This was expressed, for example, in the Economic and Social Resolution:

Economic and Social Resolution Considering the underdeveloped state of African economies which is a result of the colonial system and foreign domination;
Considering the tendency of the colonialist countries to substitute economic for political domination and thus rob the newly won independence of the African states of its true content;
Considering also the departmentalisation and lack of harmony existing in the African economies and the inadequacy of technical cadres and finance;
Considering that economic growth and development constitute the surest guarantee of the freedom of the African continent;
Considering that foreign Powers sometimes use their economic aid as a means of endeavouring to divide the African territories and isolate the Independent States from territories that are still under colonial rule;

The Conference

Affirms that independence is a prerequisite to all economic development;
Declares that the peoples of Africa are determined to work for the economic development and liberation of Africa, for the benefit and under the control of the masses;
Recommends to the independent African states:

I. The intensification of their efforts to wrest their respective countries from economic dependence on the imperialist countries....

The general resolution also spoke on this topic:

The Conference ...recommends the African governments to be active in liquidating the neo-colonialist groups, particularly any foreign military establishments on their soil;
Considering moreover the important social and economic "enclaves" created by the imperialist countries in Africa in the industrial and agricultural sectors, by the establishment of special monetary, financial, technical and social institutions entirely controlled by themselves;
Observing these foreign 'enclaves' result in the exploitation of the human, vegetable and mineral resources of Africa, and that they have been installed in the service of foreign economic systems;
Observing further that the existence of these "enclaves" enables the imperialist countries to bind the economy of certain African countries very stringently in the domains of customs, finance, trade, currency, etc.;
Considering on the other hand, that the imperialists are aiming at the organisation of all these new institutions of domination with each African people taken separately, while they are themselves co-ordinating strictly their action in order to present a united front against the efforts of economic liberation on the part of Africa;

The Conference

Affirms the absolute necessity of turning the economy of the African countries to the profit of its peoples, and of acting with unity in the economic field, as in the political and cultural fields;
Proposes therefore the creation by all the Independent African States, of common organisations for the conduct of finance and commerce, and of centres of social and economic research, for the purpose of studying the forms of technical assistance to Africa and of training the technicians whom Africa needs to ensure her economic development and her social progress;
Proclaims finally the irrevocable character of the movement towards African independence, liberty and unity; ...

The conference was particularly critical of the French government for taking measures to limit the sovereignty of its territories in North Africa that were being decolonised.

Considering the existence of the French Community, a new form of imperialist domination, and the present attempts of the French Government to impose upon countries associated with this community and on the threshold of independence, bonds of a kind which would deprive them of true national sovereignty;...

== Third Conference: Cairo, 25–31 March 1961 ==
The mood at this conference was more militant than at the second conference, partly because some conservative groups had withdrawn, and partly because the conference occurred during the crisis in the Congo. The Congolese issue was raised by the Secretary-General, Abdoulaye Diallo, in his opening address:

Today there are two forces existing in the Congo; forces which represent the imperialist interests, and forces which represent the interests of the Congolese people. The former are led by Messrs. Kasavubu, Tshombe, and their cohorts; the latter, or in other words ours, are led by Mr. Gizenga, who has the sympathy of all the people and the support of the immense majority of the population.

Later, the conference adopted a very strong resolution on the Congo:

The Conference denounces the role played by General Kettani in the degradation of the situation in the Congo and demands the dismissal of Dag Hammarskjöld equally responsible for the murder of Lumumba.

In another clause Kasavubu, Mobutu, Tshombe and Kalonji were denounced for their role. The conference proclaimed Lumumba the "hero of Africa".

The issue of neocolonialism was again raised by the conference; its four-page Resolution on Neocolonialism is cited as a landmark for having presented a collectively arrived at definition of neocolonialism and a description of its main features.

Internal contradictions within the AAPC led to its eventual demise. Wallerstein described the composition of the AAPC around the time of the Third Congress:

The AAPC had become the meeting ground of three groups: African nationalists in non-independent countries, whose revolutionary ardor was often tactical and hence temporary; leaders of the so-called revolutionary African states, whose militancy was often tempered by the exigencies of diplomacy and the reality of world economic pressures; African radical-nationalist opposition movements in independent states, which states were considered by these opposition movements as clients or "puppets" of the West. This latter group (which included the UPC, the Sawaba of Niger led by Djibo Bakary, the Moroccan Union Nationale des Forces Populaires [UNFP] represented by Mehdi Ben Barka) was perhaps the most genuinely and the most persistently militant. It also had the least real power. Therefore, while this third group often dominated the conferences and gave the tone to the resolutions, it was the second group (the governments) that dominated the structure and held the purse strings.

The difference between the two groups was to prove fatal to the AAPC, as radical pronouncements by the conference began to pose difficulties for its governmental members in their diplomatic relations with the more conservative African states. Although it was decided at the 1961 Conference that a fourth conference be held at Bamako, Mali, in February 1962, that meeting never took place because the host government, Mali, and the Secretary-General's government, Guinea, were reluctant to proceed with it. Wallerstein says that "The Casablanca governments were content to let the AAPC disappear quietly in their attempts to come to terms with the other African governments."
