= Jane Anyango =

Kenyan activist

Jane Anyango Odongo
- Born: Nairobi, Kenya
- Occupations: Peace activist; women's rights activist
- Organization(s): Polycom Development Project; Kibera Women for Peace
- Known for: Grassroots peacebuilding in Kibera and mobilising women to reduce post-election violence in Kenya
- Awards: Community Peacebuilder Award (Peace X Peace, 2010)

Jane Anyango Odongo is a Kenyan activist for peace and for women's and girls' rights. She is a grassroots activist and peacemaker, residing in one of the largest slums in Kenya. She is known for mobilizing hundreds of women who helped mitigate post election violence in the elections of 2007 and 2013. Her strategy included using women's influence on the men causing the violence, her slogan ' get the fighting men to stop the violence'.She is the founder and director of the Polycom Development Project, which empowers girls and young women in the Kibera slum area. The project focuses on topics such as hygiene, climate change, cohesion, grassroots organzining, amongst others. Her main outcome in the long run is to achieve the UN Sustainable Development Goal 10, reducing inequalities.In 2010 Peace X Peace organisation gave her its Community Peacebuilder Award. In 2016 she was one of four women invited to University of San Diego for two months on its annual Women PeaceMakers scheme.
