= Elijah Omolo Agar =

Kenyan politician

Elijah Omolo Agar was the first member of parliament for Karachuonyo Constituency after Kenya got independence from Britain. He was elected on an independent ticket in the first elections beating Gogo Ochok of Kenya African National Union (KANU).

== Education and Career ==
Elijah Omolo Agar was a master's degree graduate from Pittsburgh University in the US and a Bachelor of Economics Graduate from India. He was a staunch ally of Thomas Joseph Mboya. He served as an Assistant Minister in the Ministry of Home Affairs.

He was the editor of the pre independence newspaper called Uhuru. It is his article questioning the detention of the Kapenguria Six that earned him detention too in Lamu alongside John Keen.

== Death ==
He got involved in a near fatal accident at Ruga in Oyugis on his way from Kisii. These injuries eventually killed him in 1970 shortly after the assassination of Tom Mboya in July 1969.
