= Clement Lubembe =

Kenyan Politician

Honorable Clement Lubembe

Member of Parliament Ikolomani Constituency
- In office 1974–1979
- Preceded by: Seth Lugonzo
- Succeeded by: Jeremiah Khamabi Mureli

Member of Parliament Starehe Constituency
- In office 1966–1969
- Preceded by: Office established
- Succeeded by: Charles Rubia

Secretary general COTU
- In office 1965–1969
- Preceded by: Office established
- Succeeded by: Dennis Akumu

Secretary general KFL
- In office 1962–1965
- Preceded by: Tom Mboya
- Succeeded by: office disestablished

Personal details
- Party: KANU
- Occupation: Politician
- Profession: trade unionist

Clement Kalani Lubembe was a trade unionist and politician, closesly associated with the development of trade union politics in Kenya, serving in both the Kenya Federation of Labour and its successor Central Organization of Trade Unions as a Secretary general. He was also elected Member of Parliament for Starehe Constituency from 1966 to 1969 Ikolomani Constituency, from 1974 to 1979.
