= Joshua Aduma Owuor =

Kenyan politician and lawyer

Hon. Joshua Aduma Owuor is a Kenyan politician and lawyer. He is the Member of Parliament for Nyakach Constituency, serving since 2013 after being re-elected for another five-year term in the 2017 general elections.

== Education ==
Aduma joined Kabete Primary School for his primary education in 1967, then proceeded to Nyabondo Boys Boarding Primary School. He later attended Onjiko High School for A-levels, then to Ambira Boys for O-Levels. In 1985, he joined University of Nairobi for LLB, then KSL for PGD.

== Career ==
Aduma is a trained lawyer and has worked as town clerk for several municipalities, including Bondo, Kisumu, and Garrissa. He has been City Hall Director of Nairobi.

== Political career ==
Aduma was first elected as a member of parliament for Nyakach Constituency in 2013 on the ODM ticket.
