= Nyakach Constituency =

Kenyan electoral constituency

Nyakach
- constituency for the Parliament of Kenya
- Nyakach Constituency within Kisumu County

- Kisumu County within Kenya
- County: Kisumu County
- Population: 150,320
- Area: 327 km^{2} (126.3 sq mi)

Current constituency
- Number of members: 1
- Party: ODM
- Member of Parliament: Joshua Aduma Owuor
- Wards: 5

Nyakach is an electoral constituency in Kenya. It is one of seven constituencies of Kisumu County. The constituency has five wards, all electing MCAs for the Kisumu County Assembly and has a population of 150,320 people based on the 2019 census report.

The constituency was established for the 1966 elections, when it was split from the Nyando Constituency. It was one of three constituencies of the former Nyando District.

== Members of Parliament ==
Elections	MP	Party	Notes
1966	Cleopas Ondiek Chillo Miguda	KANU	
1969	James Dennis Akumu	KANU	One-party system
1974	Samson Odoyo	KANU	One-party system
1979	Ojwang' K’Ombudo	KANU	One-party system
1983	Ojwang' K’Ombudo	KANU	One-party system
1988	Ojwang' K’Ombudo	KANU	One-party system
1992	James Dennis Akumu	FORD-Kenya	
1997	Peter Ochieng' Odoyo	NDP	
2002	Peter Ochieng' Odoyo	NARC	
2007	Pollyins Ochieng' Anyango	ODM	
2013	Joshua Aduma Owuor	ODM	
2017	Joshua Aduma Owuor	ODM	
2022	Joshua Aduma Owuor	ODM	

== County Assembly wards ==
#	Ward	Population	Area (sq.km)	Sub-Locations
1	South West Nyakach	17,322	50.90	Comprises Kajimbo, Okanowach, Ramogi, Gari and West Kadiang’a
2	North Nyakach	33,507	110.40	Comprises Rarieda, Lisana, Kasaye, Jimo Middle, Gem Rae and Gem Nam, Agoro East, Jimo East, Awach, Agoro West and Kandaria
3	Central Nyakach	25,282	76.00	Comprises Moro, Kabodho East, Olwalo, Jimo West, Kabodho North and Kabodho West
4	West Nyakach	26,403	69.00	Comprises Upper Kadiang’a, Anding’o Opanga, West Koguta, Nyong’onga and Lower Kadiang’a
5	South East Nyakach	30,527	51.00	Comprises East Koguta, East Kadiang'a, Siany and Ramogi
