= Peter Ochieng Odoyo =

Kenyan politician

Chief Administrative Secretary, Ministry of Defence, Kenya
- Incumbent
- Assumed office 14 January 2020
- President: Uhuru Kenyatta

Member of Parliament for Nyakach Constituency
- In office 1997–2007

Personal details
- Born: 23 November 1959 (age 66) Kenya
- Spouse: Dr.Catherine Muriithi Odoyo
- Education: University of Wales (BSc); University of Bradford (MBA)
- Occupation: Politician, Economist
- Profession: Economist, Consultant
- Committees: Vice Chair, Finance, Trade and Planning Committee (1998–2001)

Peter Ochieng Odoyo (born 23 November 1959) is a Kenyan politician and economist. He was elected to represent the Nyakach Constituency in the National Assembly of Kenya from 1997 until 2007. He served as Vice Chair on the Finance, Trade and Planning Committee from 1998 until 2001. From 2001 until 2005, Odoyo held positions as Assistant Minister Foreign Affairs, Assistant Minister for Labour and Assistant Minister for Regional Development. He has been a member of the world e-parliament and was for many years their coordinator in Kenya and East Africa.

He has written and published many articles on management, leadership, diplomacy and economics in local and international papers and magazines. He was a senior consultant with Price Waterhouse Consultants and has also worked with the USAID Mission in Kenya (USAID Kenya 1987) and with the UNICEF East and Southern Region Offices as an economic consultant.

He is currently managing an advertising company based in Nairobi, Kenya, called Spellman and Walker.

Odoyo was awarded a BSc first class in Economics from the University of Wales and he also obtained an MBA with distinction from the University of Bradford.

On 14 January 2020, he was appointed by H.E. President Uhuru Kenyatta as the Chief Administrative Secretary (CAS) for the Ministry of Defense, Kenya. He effectively became the second in Command after the Cabinet Secretary for Defence.(ref State House Nairobi Kenya and MOD Kenya website).
