= Nairobi People's Convention Party =

Defunct Kenyan political party

- Leader: Tom Mboya
- Secretary: Dennis Akumu; Omolo Agar
- Secretary-General: Josef Mathenge; Dennis Akumu; Martin Shikuku
- Founded: 1957
- Dissolved: 1961
- Succeeded by: Kenya African National Union (KANU)
- Headquarters: Nairobi, Kenya Colony
- Youth wing: NPCP Youth wing (Kenya Ginger Group/NPCP Choir/NPCP Uhuru Singers)
- Women's wing: NPCP Women's wing
- Ideology: African nationalism

The Nairobi People's Convention Party (NPCP) was a Nairobi based political party formed in 1957 by Tom Mboya. This party played a crucial role in the fight for Kenya's independence. Despite attempts at suppression from the colonial government, the NPCP managed to mobilise Africans in Nairobi to further the nationalist cause and fight for independence from Britain. Following Jomo Kenyatta's release from detention in 1961, the NPCP merged with the Kenya African Union (KAU) and Kenya Independence Movement (KIM) to form the Kenya African National Union (KANU).

== History ==
Kwame Nkurumah's Convention People's Party impressed and inspired Tom Mboya. Ghana attained independence in March 1957. In Kenya, political activity by Africans was strongly discouraged by the colonial government after the Mau Mau rebellion. An outright ban on national level political organisation by Africans was in place. However, political parties at the district level were permitted. Tom Mboya attended Ghana's first anniversary independence celebrations in March 1958. This visit inspired him to increase the pace of political activity aimed at agitating for Kenya's independence. Despite the suppression, the political mood in Kenya was vibrant as African independence movements were gaining momentum. The NPCP reflected this mood more than any other political party. Although based in Nairobi it was uncompromisingly nationalistic and was the first well organised and disciplined mass party in Kenya. The NPCP expanded their boundaries beyond Nairobi with the intention of turning NPCP into an unofficial countrywide nationalist party.

== Organisational strategy ==
NPCP was described as a political machine due to its effective growth strategy and organisation. Tom Mboya was careful to ensure that the party was multi-ethnic. For instance, the NPCP's leadership group in 1958 included three people from the Luo community, two from the Kikuyu community, and two from the Luhya community. The NPCP also made inroads into other district political parties in the country, bringing their brand of organisation and vision.

== Persecution ==
Jomo Kenyatta was still imprisoned on charges that he led the Mau Mau movement. The NPCP took up the call for the release of Kenyatta, following the lead by Oginga Odinga. The colonial government continually harassed party members and attempted to crush the party by arresting several members on 6 March 1959, in what was the biggest round-up since the Mau Mau emergency. Mboya's home was raided by police, in the middle of the night, looking for subversive literature. The future President of Tanzania, Julius Nyerere was visiting Mboya at the time. Nothing was discovered by the police, but more than forty leaders and members of the NPCP were arrested and sent to their tribal homes. These included Josef Mathenge the General Secretary and Omolo Agar the Organising Secretary and Editor of the NPCP publication Uhuru. The publication was also banned. The state of emergency regulations drafted for the Mau Mau emergency were used to subjugate the party. Despite this persecution, the efforts of the NPCP youth and women's wings, ensured that the party continued to grow in popularity.

== The NPCP Youth League and Women's wing ==
NPCP had a vibrant youth and women's wing. The youth wing was also called the Kenya singer group, the NPCP Uhuru Singers and the NPCP choir Led by George Philip Ochola (also known as Ochola Ogaye Mak'Anyengo) and Wambui Otieno, large numbers of Africans were mobilised and involved in NPCP activities. The masses were called upon to attend meetings, rallies and facilitate boycotts. For instance, when the government charged the newly elected African Members of the Legislative Council in 1958, with defamation and conspiracy because they rejected the specially elected members of the council, who they perceived as traitors, a very effective two day African boycott of buses, beer and tobacco was organised. The prosecution of the African members collapsed and they only received a fine.

== Dissolution ==
In 1960, just before Jomo Kenyatta's release, the NPCP merged with the Kenya Independence Movement and Kenya African Union in order to present a national unified front at the Lancaster House Conference in the form of the Kenya African National Union (KANU).
