= Tom Mboya Monument =

Statue in Nairobi, Kenya

Coordinates: 1.284758°S 36.825372°E

The Tom Mboya Monument is along Moi Avenue in Nairobi, Kenya. It was erected in 2011 in honour of Tom Mboya, a Kenyan government minister who was assassinated in 1969. The monument stands about twenty metres from where Mboya was murdered.

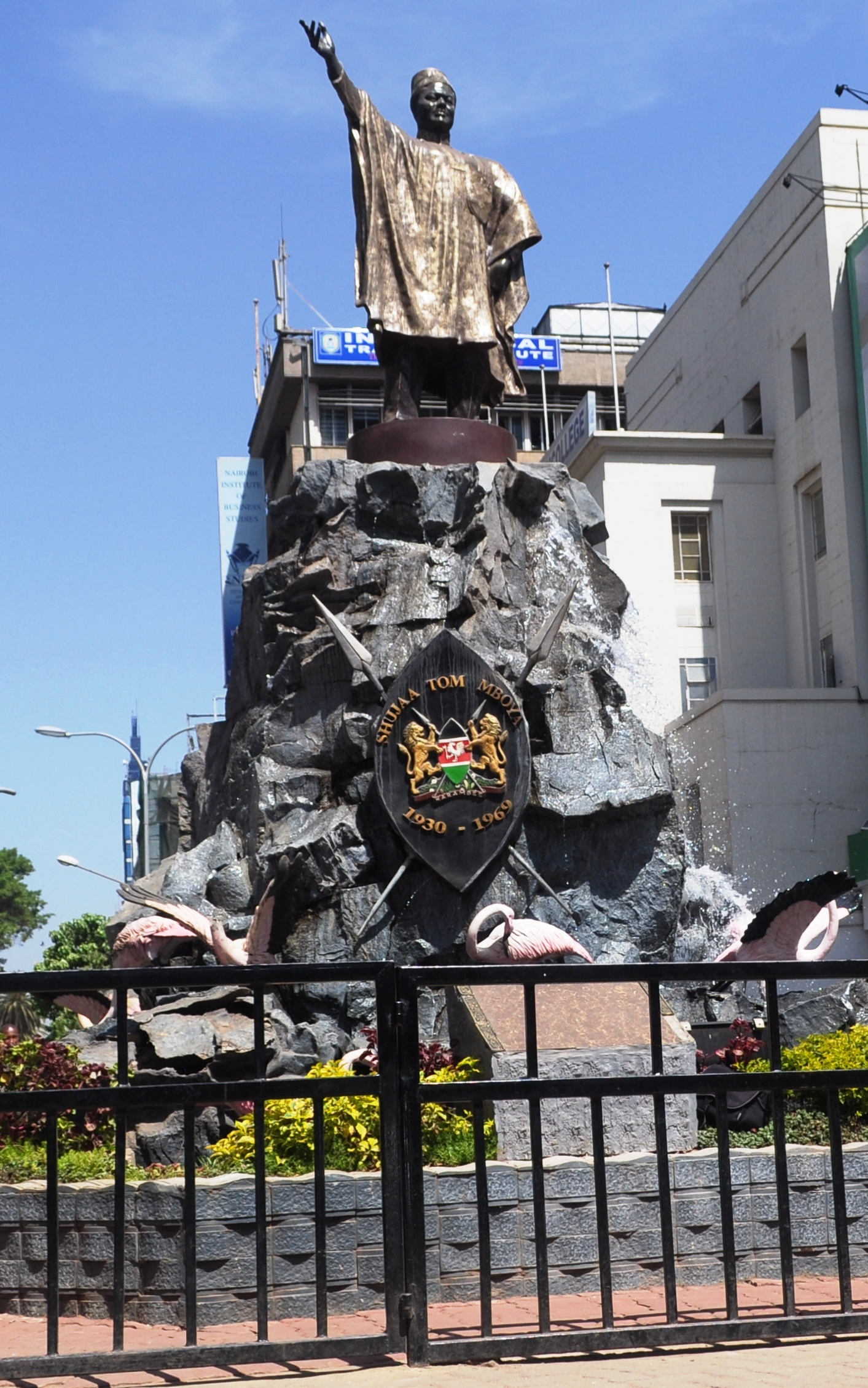
Tom Mboya Monument

== History ==
The monument was designed by sculptor Oshottoe Ondula, costing the Kenyan government KSh 20,000,000/=. The statue was unveiled on 19 October 2011. However, by mid-2019, it, along with another (that of Dedan Kimathi), had fallen into disrepair, and Governor of Machakos Alfred Mutua pledged to clean and repair them. The renovation was completed in April 2021.
