= Ikolomani Constituency =

Electoral constituency of Kenya

Ikolomani Constituency is an electoral constituency in Kenya. It is one of twelve constituencies in Kakamega County. The constituency was established for the 1963 elections. In 1988, it was split into two - Ikolomani and Shinyalu constituencies.

Total area in square km is 143.6 approximately and the population stood at 111,743 according to the 2019 census.

== Members of Parliament ==
Elections	MP	Party	Notes
1963	Jonathan Muruli	KADU	
1969	Seth Lugonzo	KANU	One-party system
1974	Clement Lubembe	KANU	One-party system
1979	Jeremiah Khamadi Murila	KANU	One-party system
1983	Seth Lugonzo	KANU	One-party system.
1988	Seth Lugonzo	KANU	One-party system.
1992	Benjamin Ashona Magwaga	KANU	
1997	Joseph Jolly Mugalla	KANU	
2002	Bonny Khalwale	NARC	
2007	Bonny Khalwale	New Ford Kenya	Nullified February 2011
2011	Bonny Khalwale	New Ford Kenya	Re-elected in May 23, 2011 By-election: Khalwale (13,208), Shinali (10,702), Matemba (293)
2013	Benard Masaka Shinali	UDF	Shinali(16,139), Vincent Mukhono (8,600), Patrick Ongayo (3,395) ^{Results 4}
2017	Benard Masaka Shinali	UDF	Shinali(15,898), Butichi Ramadhan (14,765), Vincent Mukhono (3,430) ^{Results 5}
2023	Benard Masaka Shinali	ODM	followed by Vincent Mukhono UDA.

== Wards ==
The constituency has three wards, all electing member of county Assembly for the Kakamega County Assembly.

Wards
Ward	Registered Voters
Eregi	8,291
Iguhu	15,791
Isulu	14,848
Total	38,930
*September 2005.
