= University Academic Staff Union =

UASU
- University Academic Staff Union
- Education Liberates
- Founded: 1966
- Headquarters: Nairobi, Kenya
- Location: Kenya
- Field: Higher education
- Members: 10,071
- Key people: Constantine Wasonga; Grace Nyongesa
- Website: uasukenya.org

The University Academic Staff Union is a Kenyan trade union that was registered to represent the interests of academic staff in public universities and all of their constituent colleges. This includes all academic cadres running from graduate assistant to professor. The union was initially registered in 1966 as the University College Academic Staff Association and was later converted into a union because of challenges its members had in accessing staff welfare, in the early 1970s. Its founding members included academics such as Ngugi Wa Thiong'o and Maina wa Kinyatti. Due to efforts to have Professor Ngugi reinstated at the University of Nairobi, among other confrontations with the government, the Union was disbanded by president Daniel arap Moi in 1980. Efforts to revive the union began in 1993. but the government's refusal to register the union led to a strike, by lecturers, which ran from September 1993, to November 1994, though that strike ended without accomplishing any of its objectives. The union was finally formally registered in 2003.
