= Registrar of Trade Unions =

Government office in Kenya

The Registrar of Trade Unions in Kenya is the government office that registers and oversees the operations of trade unions in the country. The process of registering a trade union takes six months and is provided for in sections 12, 13 and 14 of the Labour Relations Act, 2007, Laws of Kenya.

After obtaining a certificate from the registrar of trade unions, the trade union may apply for registration within six months if they have:

•Complied with the Labour Relations Act, 2007

•The trade union has adopted a constitution that complies with the requirements of the Labour Relation Act, 2007 and requirements set out in the first schedule

•The trade union has an office and postal addresses within Kenya

•No other trade union is already registered that is sufficiently representative of the whole or substantial proportion of the interests in respect of which the applicants seek registration Only members in the sector specified in the union constitution qualify for membership of the trade union

•The name of the trade union is not the same as that of an existing trade union

•The decision to register the trade union was made at a meeting attended by at least fifty members of that trade union

•The trade union is independent of direct or indirect control of any employer or employers association

•The trade union’s sole purpose is to pursue the activities of a trade union.
