= Pollyins Ochieng Anyango =

Kenyan politician

Pollyins Ochieng Anyango is a Kenyan politician. He belongs to the Orange Democratic Movement and was elected to represent the Nyakach Constituency in the National Assembly of Kenya since the 2007 Kenyan parliamentary election.
