= Peace X Peace =

Nonprofit organization

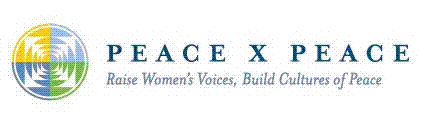
- Organization logo
- Formation: 2002
- Legal status: Nonprofit
- Location: Online
- Region served: World
- Founder: Patricia Smith Melton
- Past Executive Directors: Dr. Sarah McCue; Dr. Pat Morris
- CEO: Kim Weichel

Peace X Peace (pronounced “peace by peace”) is a nonprofit women's organization founded in 2002 that promotes building peace through online communications.

== History ==
Peace X Peace was founded in 2002 by Patricia Smith Melton, who gathered experts in peace and women's rights from around the world (including Isabel Allende, the Chilean novelist; Susan Collin Marks, the Australian-born co-founder of Search for Common Ground; and Fatima Gailani, the Afghan head of the Red Crescent) to elaborate a women's response to the September 11 attacks.

Dr. Sarah McCue served as the first President, Dr. Pat Morris served as executive director of Peace X Peace, and in 2010 Kim Weichel was named CEO.

== Awards ==
- In 2002 the Isabel Allende Foundation honored Peace X Peace with the Espiritu Award for the Pursuit of Peace
- The documentary Peace by Peace: Women on the Frontlines won the Golden Eagle Cine Award in 2004 and the Best Documentary Aurora Award in 2006
- In 2005, Religious Science International, a nonprofit based in Seattle, recognized Peace X Peace with its Golden Works Award for activities that exemplify the RSI mission, "awakening humanity to its spiritual magnificence"
- In 2006, Working Mother named it one of the 25 Best Places for Women to Work
- In 2007, Peace X Peace won the ePhilanthropy Foundation's Best Community Building/Activism Award
- In November 2008, Peace X Peace won the Technology Innovation Award from NPower Greater DC and Accenture
- In December 2008, Peace X Peace Founder Patricia Smith Melton was selected as one of OneWorld's People of 2008 and received The Rumi Peace and Dialogue Award
