= Kenya Federation of Labour =

KFL
- Kenya Federation of Labour
- Founded: 1952
- Dissolved: 1965
- Headquarters: Nairobi, Kenya
- Location: Kenya
- Key people: Tom Mboya
- Affiliations: ICFTU

The Kenya Federation of Labour was a trade union that played an important role in labour organisation in the decade leading up to Kenya's independence, as well as the early development of the labour movement in post-independence Kenya, before it was folded into the Central Organization of Trade Unions. It was founded as the Kenya Federation of Registered Trade Unions, a federation of trade unions representing native Kenyans, organised by Aggrey Minya to coordinate trade union activities in the Kenya Colony in 1952. The trade union's activities were severely curtailed by the mass arrest of many of its leaders during the state of emergency declared in the wake of the Mau Mau Rebellion in 1952, including leaders such as Fred Kubai and Bildad Kaggia. The organisation became the Kenya Federation of Labour when Tom Mboya took over as its secretary general. The union organised a massive dock workers strike, that paralysed operations in Mombasa, and eventually secured the dock workers a 33 percent increase in their pay. Tom Mboya would move on to be a critical leading light in the founding of the Kenya African National Union, the party that would lead Kenya's first post independence, and he would be succeeded in the KFL by Clement Lubembe. However, ongoing antagonism between Mboya-aligned leaders and trade unionists such as Dennis Akumu and Ochola Mak’Anyengo, over matters such as Cold War alignment with the West over the Soviets, led the latter to found the Africa Workers Congress. It is in light of the wragling between KFL and the KAWC, that the Government of Kenya stepped in and facilitated a merger of the to organisations into COTU in 1965.
