= Journal of Contemporary African Studies =

Academic journal

- Discipline: African studies
- Language: English

Publication details
- History: Since 1981
- Publisher: Routledge
- Frequency: Quarterly
- Impact factor: 0.8 (2024)

Standard abbreviations
- ISO 4: J. Contemp. Afr. Stud.

Indexing
- ISSN: 0258-9001 (print); 1469-9397 (web)
- LCCN: 82645492
- OCLC no.: 321021615

Links
- Journal homepage; Online access; Online archive

The Journal of Contemporary African Studies is a quarterly peer-reviewed academic journal covering African studies. It was originally published biannually, later changing to quarterly. The editor-in-chief is Nthabiseng Motsemme (University of Johannesburg).
