= Dennis Akumu =

Kenyan politician and trade union leader (1934–2016)

Dennis Akumu (7 August 1934 – 15 August 2016) was a Kenyan politician, trade unionist and independence freedom fighter. He was the first secretary general of the Organisation of African Trade Union Unity (OATUU).

== Early life ==
James Dennis "JD" Obong Akumu was born to Blasto Akumu and Patricia Abuya in Nyakach in the then Nyanza Province of Kenya. He was a Kenyan trade unionist and politician who was the MP for Nyakach constituency from 1969 to 1973, and from 1992 to 1997.

== Family and education ==
Akumu was one of Blasto's seven children. His younger sister Asenath Bole Ogada was a novelist and publisher who promoted writing in Dholuo. James, fondly nicknamed "JD", was born in Central Nyanza and educated at the Onjiko Secondary School in Kisumu before attending Aggrey Memorial High School near Kampala, Uganda. His stay in Uganda was cut short when he decided to return to Kenya to further his education at the Kenya Medical Training College in Nairobi from 1952–1954, with the intention of becoming a medical doctor. However, due to his calling to fight for Uhuru and because of the state of Emergency occasioned caused by the Mau Mau Uprising, his education was interrupted. Soon afterwards, he took up a job as a laboratory technician at East African Breweries. It is while working at the brewery that he became active in the labor and trade union movement.

== Trade unionist ==
His calling as an organizer and champion for workers' rights was honed when he joined the Distributive and Commercial Workers Union. Shortly afterwards, he became the union's representative but due to his astute organizing activities and rising popularity within the union, he was dismissed by his superiors who felt threatened. He went on to work as the district organizer for staff of the Local Government Worker's Union in Nairobi.

Unhappy with how workers in Kenya were treated, he became active in the trade unions and eventually politics.

Akumu first met Trade Unionist and popular politician, Tom Joseph Mboya in 1952 while both were participants in a debate at the Mbagathi Postal Training Center. Mboya, who then worked as a Health Inspector at the Nairobi City Council had a massive influence on Akumu's career. Their friendship grew over time and became stronger when Mboya later became the Secretary General of the Kenya Federation of Labor.

Akumu expanded his horizons and travelled with Mboya regionally in Africa but also to the US and Europe. In 1958 Tom Mboya sent Akumu to Accra, Ghana to attend the preparatory committee meeting of the All African People’s Conference where he met President Kwame Nkrumah, a man he greatly admired. That meeting solidified his commitment to Pan Africanism. Through the AAPC Dennis Akumu linked up to African leaders in the diaspora such as Philip Randolph, USA and Michael Manley of Jamaica and he honed his bridge building/ Pan African skills. He became Director of the Africa’s Workers Congress from 1964-1965.

As Secretary General of the Dockworkers Union, headquartered in Mombasa, he fought for and oversaw the Africanization of the Port of Mombasa and the elevation of African workers to supervisory positions heretofor held by Europeans. He also negotiated better wages and terms of employment for all. He worked tirelessly and leaving the Dockworkers Union was very difficult for him but he was called to Nairobi to lead the Central Organization of Trade Unions.

In 1965, Dennis Akumu joined the Central Organization of Trade Unions of Kenya as a Deputy General Secretary. Akumu later became COTU (K)’s Secretary General from 1969 through 1975 and a founding Secretary General of the Organisation of African Trade Union Unity, OATUU based in Accra, Ghana in 1973.

== Politics ==
In 1957, a political alliance was spawned when he supported Tom Mboya's successful political campaign. As a result, they formed the People's Convention Party of Kenya for which he was the first Organizing Secretary and later became the Secretary General. His charisma, oratory and organizing skills were recognized by Mboya who was head of the Kenya Federation of Labor. In 1958, Mboya encouraged Akumu to accept the position of the General Secretary of the Mombasa Dock Workers' Union, a position he cherished and was rewarded for by being reelected four times to serve for ten years.

In 1960, Akumu won a seat and served as the first of the four Africans in the Mombasa City Council for two years. While attending the All African People’s conference in Tunisia in 1960, due to the polarizing positions at Lancaster House constitutional conference he was airlifted from the Tunisia meeting to London to serve as the so-called a “backroom man” to help reach compromise on the type of constitution Kenya would adopt. He was called to share his expertise, experience and make recommendations in 2001 at the Mombasa Workshop at a session with Lancaster House constitution Making veterans; in 2003 at the Plenary Proceedings, Presentation at Lancaster House held at the Bomas of Kenya; and as an Observer during the historic Constitution of Kenya Review Commission National Constitution conference in 2005.

Akumu was first detained by the Kenyatta government in 1966 for almost a year owing to his involvement in politics. In 1990, he was detained again, this time by the Moi government for a fortnight as a result of his passionate campaign and support for the return of multi-party democracy in Kenya under the Forum for Restoration of Democracy (FORD) banner.

In 1969, he was elected Member of Parliament for Nyakach constituency under the one party system of the Kenya African National Union (KANU) and served until 1973. He was again elected the Member of Parliament for the same constituency in 1992-1997 on a FORD-Kenya ticket.

He was honored to represent the people of Nyakach in Parliament and as Member of Parliament, he worked for and attained improvements for his constituents as is fondly remembered for improving roads, broadening access to piped water, ensuring better health services and facilitating access to higher education through his international networks to the United States, Europe, Asia and across Africa.

Akumu worked tirelessly to unite Africans, narrow ideological differences, restore African workers' dignity and resist forces of exploitation for Africa's independence. In the spirit of Pan-Africanism, he reached out to and built bridges in North America, Latin America and the Caribbeans. Among his many other achievements was his work in strengthening the anti-Apartheid movement and the fight for liberation for all Africans through the OAU and UN mechanisms. Akumu was instrumental in the reburial of President Kwame Nkrumah and the establishment of the WEB Dubois Center in Accra, Ghana.

== Death ==
Akumu was generally healthy most of his life. He was diagnosed with kidney complications in 2006. He sought medical attention in different medical facilities but unfortunately, his health deteriorated. After a decade-long struggle with kidney failure, he died on 18 August 2016 at the Aga Khan Hospital in Nairobi, age 82.
