= Tom Mboya =

Kenyan politician and labour leader (1930–1969)

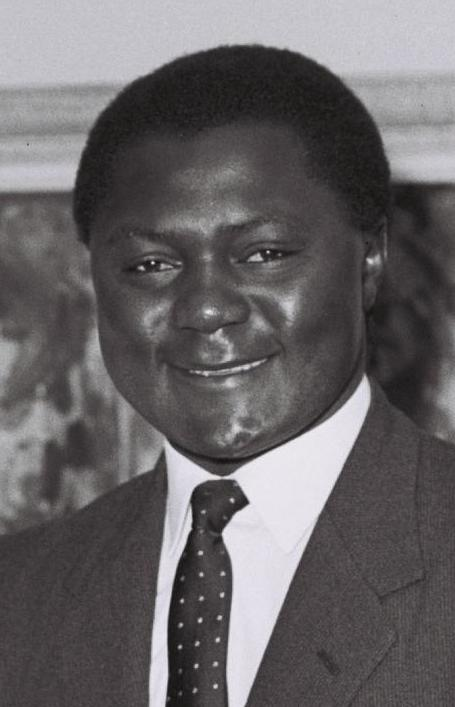
- Mboya in 1962

Minister of Economic Planning and Development
- In office December 1964 – 5 July 1969
- President: Jomo Kenyatta
- Preceded by: Office established
- Succeeded by: Office abolished

Minister of Justice and Constitutional Affairs
- In office June 1963 – December 1964
- Prime Minister: Jomo Kenyatta
- Preceded by: Office established
- Succeeded by: Charles Njonjo (1980)

Minister of Labour
- In office April 1962 – June 1963
- Preceded by: Office established
- Succeeded by: Ngala Mwendwa

Member of Parliament
- In office 1963 – 5 July 1969
- Preceded by: Office established
- Succeeded by: Maina Wanjingi
- Constituency: Nairobi Central

Personal details
- Born: 15 August 1930 Kilima Mbogo, British East Africa (present-day Kenya)
- Died: 5 July 1969 (aged 38) Nairobi, Kenya
- Resting place: Tom Mboya Mausoleum
- Party: KANU (from 1960)
- Spouses: Margaret Ogweno (div. 1954); Pamela Odede (m. 1962)
- Children: 5, including Susan
- Education: Ruskin College

Thomas Joseph Odhiambo Mboya (15 August 1930 – 5 July 1969) was a Kenyan politician and labour leader. He was one of the founding fathers of the Republic of Kenya. He led the negotiations for independence at the Lancaster House Conferences and was instrumental in the formation of Kenya's independence party – the Kenya African National Union (KANU) – where he served as its first Secretary-General. He laid the foundation for Kenya's capitalist and mixed economy policies at the height of the Cold War and set up several of the country's key labour institutions. Mboya was Minister for Economic Planning and Development when he was assassinated.

Mboya's intelligence, charm, leadership, and oratory skills won him admiration from all over the world. He gave speeches, participated in debates and interviews across the world in favour of Kenya's independence from British colonial rule. He also spoke at several rallies in the goodwill of the Civil Rights movement in the United States. In 1958, at the age of 28, Mboya was elected Conference Chairman at the All-African Peoples' Conference convened by Kwame Nkrumah of Ghana. He helped build the Trade Union Movement in Kenya, Uganda and Tanzania, as well as across Africa. He also served as the Africa Representative to the International Confederation of Free Trade Unions (ICFTU). In 1959, Mboya called a conference in Lagos, Nigeria, to form the first All-Africa ICFTU labour organization.

Mboya worked with both John F. Kennedy and Martin Luther King Jr. to create educational opportunities for African students, an effort that resulted in the Kennedy Airlifts of the 1960s enabling East African students to study in American colleges. Notable beneficiaries of this airlift include Wangari Maathai. In 1960, Mboya was the first Kenyan to be featured on the front page cover of Time magazine in a painting by Bernard Safran.

== Early life ==
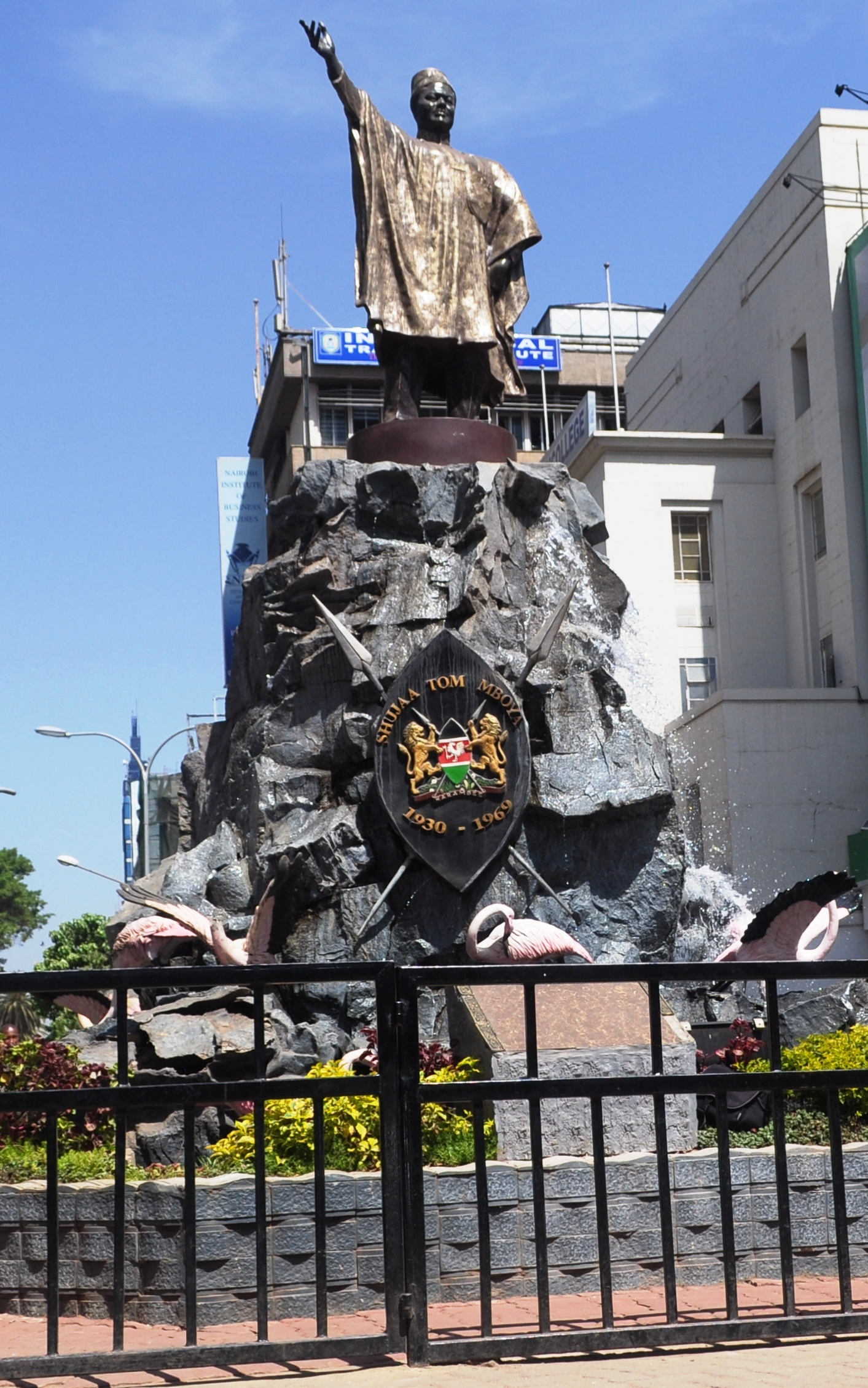
A monument in honour of Mboya erected at Moi Avenue, Nairobi

His parents Leonardus Ndiege and Marcella Onyango were from the Luo ethnic group of Kenya, and were both low-income sisal cutters working on the colonial farm of Sir William Northrup McMillan, at today's Juja Farm Area. Thomas ("Tom") Joseph Odhiambo Mboya was born at this colonial sisal farm on 15 August 1930, near the town of Thika, in what was called the White Highlands of Kenya. Mboya's father Leonard Ndiege was later promoted as an overseer at this sisal plantation and worked for 25 years. Eventually Leonard and Marcella had seven children, five sons and two daughters. When Mboya was nine years old, his father sent him to a mission school in Kamba region.

== Education ==
Mboya was educated at various Catholic mission schools. In 1942, he joined St. Mary's School Yala – a Catholic secondary school in Yala, located in Nyanza province where Mboya began his education in English and History. In 1946, he attended the Holy Ghost College (later Mang'u High School), where he passed well enough to proceed to do his Cambridge School Certificate. In 1948, Mboya joined the Royal Sanitary Institute's Medical Training School for Sanitary Inspectors at Nairobi, qualifying as an inspector in 1950. He also enrolled in a certificate course in economics at Efficiency Correspondence College of South Africa. In 1955, he received a scholarship from the Trades Union Congress to attend Ruskin College, where he studied industrial management. After his graduation in 1956, he returned to Kenya and joined politics at a time when the British colonial authorities were gradually suppressing the Mau Mau rebellion spearheaded by the Kenya Land and Freedom Army.

== Political life ==
Mboya's political life started immediately after he was employed at Nairobi City Council as a sanitary inspector in 1950. During his stint at Nairobi City Council, Mboya was elected as African Staff Association's president and immediately embarked on moulding the association into a trade union named the Kenya Local Government Workers' Union. This made his employer suspicious, but he resigned from his position before he could be laid off. He was, however, able to continue working for the Kenya Labour Workers Union as secretary-general before embarking on his studies in Britain.

In 1953, during the Mau Mau War for Independence, Jomo Kenyatta and other leaders of the independence party, Kenya African Union (KAU), were arrested. They asked Mboya to lead the KAU and continue the struggle. However, the government banned the KAU. Mboya then turned to use the trade unions as a platform to fight for independence. He was elected as Secretary General of the Kenya Federation of Labour (KFL), the umbrella body for trade unions in Kenya. In that role, Mboya gave speeches in London and Washington, D.C. opposing British colonial rule in Kenya. He also organized several strikes seeking better working conditions for African workers. At that point, the colonial government nearly closed down the labour movement in the effort to suppress his activities. Mboya reached out to other labour leaders across the world, more so in the ICFTU, including American A. Philip Randolph, with whom he was close. Mboya raised funds to build a headquarters for the KFL.

In 1956, after Mboya had returned from the United Kingdom, the colonial government allowed black Africans to run for office and serve in the Legislative Assembly. Tom Mboya was elected from Nairobi. He was elected secretary of the African Caucus (called African Elected Members Organization – AEMO) and continued a campaign for independence, as well as seeking freedom for Jomo Kenyatta and other political prisoners. He used his incredible diplomacy skills to get support for the independence movement from foreign countries. In 1957, he became dissatisfied with the low number of African leaders (only eight out of fifty at the time) in the Legislative council and decided to form his party, the Nairobi People's Convention Party.

At that time, Mboya developed a close relationship with Kwame Nkrumah of Ghana who, like Mboya, was a Pan-Africanist. In 1958, during the All-African Peoples' Conference in Ghana, convened by Kwame Nkrumah, Mboya was elected as the Conference Chairman at the age of 28. In 1959, Mboya along with the African-American Students Foundation in the United States organized the Airlift Africa project, through which 81 Kenyan students were flown to the U.S. to study at U.S. universities. Barack Obama's father, Barack Obama Sr., was a friend of Mboya's and a fellow Luo who received a scholarship through the AASF and occasional grants for books and expenses. Barack Obama Sr. was not on the first airlift plane in 1959, because he was headed for Hawaii, not the continental US. In 1960, the Kennedy Foundation agreed to underwrite the airlift, after Mboya visited Senator Jack Kennedy to ask for assistance, and Airlift Africa was extended to Uganda, Tanganyika and Zanzibar (now Tanzania), Northern Rhodesia (now Zambia), Southern Rhodesia (now Zimbabwe), and Nyasaland (now Malawi). Some 230 African students received scholarships to study at Class I accredited colleges in the United States in 1960, and hundreds more in 1961–63.

In 1961, Jomo Kenyatta was released and, together with Oginga Odinga and Mboya's Nairobi People's Convention Party, joined with Kenya African Union and Kenya Independence Movement and formed the Kenya African National Union (KANU) in an attempt to form a party that would both transcend tribal politics and prepare for participation in the Lancaster House Conference (held at Lancaster House in London) where Kenya's constitutional framework and independence were to be negotiated. As Secretary General of KANU, Mboya headed the Kenyan delegation and designed the flag for the new republic.

== After independence ==
In the newly independent country, Mboya, who was a pre-independence Minister of Labour since 1962, was appointed by the New Prime Minister, Jomo Kenyatta, as the MP for Nairobi Central Constituency (today, Kamukunji Constituency) and became Minister of Justice and Constitutional Affairs—a post he held from 1 June 1963, until December 1964. He created the National Social Security Fund, Kenya's social security scheme. He also established an Industrial Court to hear labour-management cases.

When Kenya became a republic on 12 December 1964, the new President Kenyatta appointed Tom Mboya to the Economic Planning and Development Ministry and transferred all functions of his former Justice ministry to the office of Attorney General under Charles Mugane Njonjo. Together with his deputy then Mwai Kibaki, he issued Sessional Paper 10, which defined Kenya's form of economic policies, when it was debated and passed by parliament in 1965. Mboya presented the Sessional Paper No. 10 for debate in parliament in April 1965 covering the period of 1964 – 1970 under the title African Socialism and its Application to Planning in Kenya. Kenyatta and Mboya were known advocates of a non-aligned international policy, not wanting blanket application of capitalism while completely abhorring scientific socialism. In 1966, Tom Mboya was removed from the economic planning ministry and Kibaki was appointed for the first time as full Minister for Commerce and Industry. Mboya's development plans at the Economic Planning Ministry were credited for Kenya's development rate of 7%, which was sustained during his tenure as the Planning Minister.

== Assassination ==
He retained the portfolio as Minister for Economic Planning and Development until his death at the age of 38 when he was gunned down on 5 July 1969 at Government Road (now Moi Avenue), Nairobi CBD, after visiting Chaani's Pharmacy. Nahashon Isaac Njenga Njoroge was convicted for the murder and later hanged. After his arrest, Njoroge asked: "Why don't you go after the big man?" Due to such statements, suspicions arose that Mboya's shooting was a political assassination.

Outrage over his assassination led to riots in the major cities of Kenya. President Jomo Kenyatta gave a eulogy at Mboya's requiem mass, saying of his colleague: "Kenya's independence would have been seriously compromised were it not for the courage and steadfastness of Tom Mboya." A statue of Mboya was installed on Moi Avenue, where he was killed, and the nearby busy Victoria Street was renamed Tom Mboya Street in his honour.

Mboya left a wife and five children. He is buried in a mausoleum on Rusinga Island, which was built in 1970.

Mboya's role in Kenya's politics and transformation is the subject of increasing interest, especially with the prominence of American politician Barack Obama. Obama's father, Barack Obama Sr., was a US-educated Kenyan who benefited from Mboya's scholarship program in the 1960s, going on to get married during his stay there, fathering the future Illinois Senator and President. Obama Sr. had seen Mboya shortly before the assassination and testified at the ensuing trial. Obama Sr. believed he was later targeted in a hit-and-run incident as a result of this testimony.

In a 1976 interview, James Jesus Angleton, a retired senior CIA official, expressed his opinion that Mboya was killed by the KGB as part of a Cold War campaign against pro-Western politicians in Africa.

In 2023, Robert F. Kennedy Jr., who had known Mboya in his boyhood, publicly accused Daniel arap Moi of orchestrating Mboya's assassination.

== Personal life ==
Tom Mboya married Pamela Odede on Saturday, 20 January 1962 at St. Peter Claver’s Catholic Church on Racecourse Road, in Nairobi. Pamela, a graduate of the Makerere University, was the daughter of politician Walter Odede. The couple had five children. Their daughters are Maureen Odero, a high court judge in Mombasa and Susan Mboya, a Coca-Cola executive, who continues the education airlift program initiated by Tom Mboya, and is married to former Nairobi governor Evans Kidero. Their sons included Lucas Mboya, and twin brothers Peter (died in a 2004 motorcycle accident) and Patrick (died aged four).

After Mboya's death, Pamela had one child, Tom Mboya Jr, with Alphonse Okuku, the brother of Tom Mboya. Pamela died of an illness in January 2009 while seeking treatment in South Africa.
