= West Pokot District =

Former district of Kenya

Coordinates: 1.23333°N 35.1167°E

West Pokot District, formerly known as West Suk or Kacheliba District, was an administrative district in the Rift Valley Province of Kenya. Its capital town was Kapenguria.

== History ==
Before the transfer of portions of Uganda to British East Africa in 1902, the area that formed West Suk District, also known as West Pokot District, was initially administered as part of Baringo District. Upon the transfer the West Pokot was combined with South Turkana District to form Turkana District of Naivasha Province. In 1918, South Turkana came into direct military administration and West Suk (West Pokot) was established as a district of Naivasha Province, then Kerio Province in 1921, and under the newly created Turkana Province from 1929. In 1941, West Suk was transferred to Rift Valley Province, and administered jointly with Trans Nzoia District. In 1942, they were separated and West Pokot administered from Kapenguria. West Pokot District was one of the districts of Kenya, 1963.

By 2005, West Pokot had been split into three; with two smaller additional districts of Pokot North and Pokot Central. The district's had a combine population of 512,690. The three districts also had a population that was predominantly considered rural with whole population of Pokot Central and Pokot North being rural, and the population 138,367 of 181,063 in West Pokot District considered rural.

In 2010, after the promulgation of the new constitution of Kenya, counties were to be created based on the districts of Kenya that existed as at 1992. This effectively led to the creation of West Pokot County.

== District subdivisions ==
Local authorities (councils)
Authority	Type	Population*	Urban pop.*
Kapenguria	Municipality	56,019	12,984
Chepareria	Town	8,212	901
Pokot	County	243,855	0
Total	-	308,086	13,885
* 1999 census. Source:

Administrative divisions
Division	Population*	Urban pop.*	Headquarters
Alale	29,679	0	
Chepareria	68,518	900	Chepareria
Chesegon	21,343	0	
Kacheliba	20,151	0	
Kapenguria	62,746	12,438	Kapenguria
Kasei	9,879	0	
Kongelai	20,018	0	Kongelai
Lelan	32,931	0	
Sigor	42,821	0	Sigor
Total	308,086	13,338	-
* 1999 census. Sources: , ,

The district had four constituencies:

- Kacheliba Constituency
- Kapenguria Constituency
- Sigor Constituency
