= Flags of counties of Kenya =

The list shows flags for the forty-seven counties of Kenya. The counties were created following the adoption of the new Constitution of Kenya in 2010 in a push for devolution. The County Governments Act in 2012 outlined the requirement for counties to enact legislation adopting a county flag, a county public seal, and a coat of arms. The County Governments Act provided general guidelines for the adoption process of these county symbols, calling for the execution of a consultative process administered by the County Executive followed by approval of these symbols by county legislation. The act prohibits the imitation of national symbols. Some counties adopted the flag of the defunct municipal or district governments.

The usage of all county flags is regulated and only certain usages of these flags are permitted. Misuse and mistreatment of county symbols is a punishable offense and may incur a fine or imprisonment.

== Current county flags ==
Descriptions in the table below of current county flags follow the colour terminology used in gazette reports where possible. Some flags do not yet have available images and so a similar flag is displayed when possible.

Flag	Date	Use	Description
	1 July 2014 – present	Flag of Baringo	The flag is a horizontal tricolour starting at the top with green symbolizing pristineness, gold symbolizing mineral and natural resources, and golden brown symbolizing arable soils. Each colour is separated by a narrow white stripe. A light blue shield is in the center of the flag on top of two white spears. On the shield, there is a map of Baringo county featuring a geyser in the center, representative of Lake Bogoria. The flag was adopted through The Baringo County Symbols Act in 2014, fourteen days after its publication in the county gazette and Kenya gazette.
	21 July 2014 – present	Flag of Bomet	The flag is a bend sinister, consisting of three main diagonal stripes of light blue, white, and green in order from top hoist to bottom fly. A thinner green stripe is present on the upper margin of the white stripe, under the light blue stripe. A similar light blue stripe is present on the bottom margin of the white stripe, above the bottom green stripe. This arrangement creates a fimbriation of the center white stripe. A modified version of the county seal is in the center, retaining the dark red circle, the five gold stars around the upper half of the circle, and a map of the county filled in with the background field of the flag.
	Unclear – present	Flag of Bungoma	The flag features three main horizontal stripes composing the flag field. The top stripe is blue, the middle red, and the bottom black. Each of these major stripes is separated by a narrower white stripe. A green pile is on the hoist side of the flag and contains the coat of arms surrounded by nine white stars spread across its left, top, and right side.
	Unclear – present	Flag of Busia	The flag is a horizontal tricolour with green at the top symbolizing agriculture and natural resources, white in the middle symbolizing peace and harmony, and blue in the bottom symbolizing Lake Victoria. The gate in the center of the flag represents the county's location as a gateway to other regions of Africa.
	20 June 2014 – present	Flag of Elgeyo-Marakwet	The flag is a horizontal tricolour with brown in the top, white in the middle, and dark green in the bottom. The coat of arms is in the middle of the flag.
	29 September 2015 – present	Flag of Embu	The flag is a gusset flag with the gusset extending from the fly, tapering into a thin white stripe separating a top green half and a bottom gold half. The green symbolizes the agricultural potential of the county. The white represents optimism, imagination, hope, peace, friendship, and coexistence. The gold represents prosperity and wealth. The coat of arms of the county is present on the fly side of the flag inside the gusset. The blue in the coat of arms symbolizes industry and infrastructure.
	Unclear – present	Flag of Garissa	The flag consists of seven horizontal stripes in alternating blue and yellow, representing the seven subcounties of the county. A red trapezoid on the hoist side of the flag contains a circular yellow seal with a blue border. The blue border contains text stating the name of the county and "Home of the Hirola". The hirola, a critically endangered antelope species found in Garissa, features inside the seal. The blue in the flag represents "trust in God, Loyalty to our national values, the need for peace, order and confidence (...)". The yellow represents sunshine, hope, intellect, and harmony, The red represents confidence, courage, vitality, passion, and willpower to pursue development goals. The white represents new beginnings, clarity, virtue, openness, and truthfulness.
	Unclear – present	Flag of Homa Bay	The flag is a horizontal tricolour, starting at the top with orange, blue, and green. The coat of arms of Homa Bay is in the center of the flag. The coat of arms is made up of a shield on top of two spears. The shield contains two roan antelopes and is bordered by strands of millet on either side. The shield also contains a cotton bud, a pineapple, and the silhouette of a fish in a lake (from top to bottom).
	21 December 2015 – present	Flag of Isiolo	Isiolo county's flag is a horizontal bicolor with a pile – with green on the top, yellow on the bottom, and a white triangle at the hoist. The green symbolizes the county's vegetation, wildlife, and people. The yellow represents the hospitality and energetic nature of the county. The coat of arms of the county is in the white triangle and features a standing Beisa oryx and a standing Grévy's zebra. A green and yellow bicolour shield is located between the two animals and features a lion head on the top. Below the shield, there is a rising sun. A boran bull features on the center of the shield, representing the pastoral society and economy of the county.
	11 January 2019 – present	Flag of Kajiado	The flag features three main stripes with a larger blue stripe in the top, a larger green stripe in the bottom, and a thinner middle stripe with a Maasai kanga pattern in blue, red, and white (Shuka). A shield with three horizontal stripes is overlaid on two black spears in the center of the flag. The shield stripes align with the stripes of the flag's field. The top stripe features and elephant, mountain, and ice cap symbolizing natural resources, the landscape, and biodiversity. The middle stripe is black and features a white boy and girl symbolizing the complementarity of the sexes. The bottom stripe is red with a white cow, representing the importance of livestock in the Maasai community. The flag was adopted fourteen days after its publication in the county gazette.
	25 September 2015 – present	Flag of Kakamega	The flag features three main horizontal stripes starting with green at the top representing nature, growth, stability, and agriculture. The middle white stripe signifies safety, peace, purity, and co-existence. The bottom golden stripe represents wealth, passion, natural resources, and human resources. Each of these stripes is separated by a thinner black stripe, with the colour representing wisdom, prudence, and the people. The coat of arms without the man and the woman is present in the center of the flag. The coat of arms contains a traditional Luhya shield. The top of the shield contains the crying stone of Ilesi, a landmark of the Kakamega forest. The center of the shield contains a golden watchband representing the 12 subcounties and 60 wards of the county matching the 12 hours and 60 minutes of the clockface. The bottom of the shield depicts maize, sugarcane, a traditional Luhya pot, and Isukuti artifacts.
This flag is incorrect and should not have a ribbon under the shield.	20 June 2018 – present	Flag of Kericho	The flag features three horizontal stripes: one middle yellow band between two green stripes. The stripes are fimbriated by thin white bands running between the three major stripes. The green represents the environment. The yellow represents happiness and the warmth of the people. The white represents peace and unity. A modified version of the coat of arms features as a badge in the center of the flag. The coat of arms is composed of a yellow oval shield on top of two spears. The shield features a tea bud, an identifying feature of the county.
	2019(?) – present	Flag of Kiambu	This flag replaces the previous flag of Kiambu adopted in 2017. The flag features three main horizontal stripes starting with reddish brown at the top representing the red soil of the county, a sign of wealth and cultural richness. The middle stripe is white symbolizes purity, cleanliness, neutrality, peace, and new beginnings. The bottom green stripe represents growth, balance, birth, self-reliance, positivity, and strength. The middle white stripe contains two thinner bands of blue, with the colour representing trust, responsibility, gender-neutrality, and endlessness. The county seal appears as a badge in the center of the flag. The seal features twelve beads representing the twelve subcounties of Kiambu. The beads are designed to resemble both coffee beans representative of agriculture, and cowrie shells representative of culture and beauty. A hand holding a bull-tail whisk is in the center of the seal, representing good leadership, and culture.
	Unclear – present	Flag of Kilifi	The flag is composed of three main horizontal stripes, starting from the top with gold, representing mineral resources, then the green, representing agriculture, and lastly blue, symbolizing aquatic and tourism resources. A shield is outlined in white in the center of the flag and filled with the same colours as the flag's field. The top stripe of the shield contains a sunrise, symbolizing rebirth, life, and hope. The middle stripe contains coconut trees symbolizing agricultural potential and a mortar and pestle, symbolizing the county's cultural heritage.
	16 July 2019 – present	Flag of Kirinyaga	The flag is a diagonal tricolor (bend sinister) with green in the top hoist representing agriculture, white in the center representing peace and coexistence, and yellow in the bottom fly representing the rise of the county. Recent official usage show the colors reversed. The center of the flag contains the county coat of arms. The coat of arms features a sun rising behind Mt. Kenya, representing the rise of a new season. Under Mt. Kenya, the coat of arms features tea, coffee, and rice. The four stars under these represents the four subcounties.
	27 April 2015 – present	Flag of Kisii	The flag of Kisii county was first raised at a ceremony in Gusii Stadium. The flag is a horizontal tricolor (fess) starting with blue in the top representing the phrase "the sky is the limit", the middle in white representing peace and unity, and green in the bottom representing agriculture. The badge in the center is a modified version of the county seal. The seal outline is made of yellow rope, symbolizing unity and strength. The seal bears seven stars at the top representing the six clans of the Gusii people and other members of the community. The seal also features hills representing the Kisii highlands, a Kisii soapstone representing the creative arts, and the Mwanyagetinge, a round ring representing the unity of the Gusii people.
Unclear whether this flag is correct.	21 July 2014 – present	Flag of Kisumu	The information about the current Kisumu county flag is currently inaccessible.
Unclear whether this flag is correct.	Unclear – present	Flag of Kitui	The information about the current Kitui county flag is currently inaccessible.
	27 May 2016 – present	Flag of Kwale	This flag has been shown to be in use in official capacities, but does not match the design of the flag as outlined by The Kwale County Flag, Emblems and Names Protection Act in 2016. The red serves as a link to the emblematic colours of Kenya. The white symbolizes peace and tranquility. The black represents the people. The blue represents life and the sea. The green represents resource abundance. The flag features the county seal. The seal contains a palm tree to represent cash crops, a rising sun to represent a "new dawn", and a sable antelope, a subspecies found in Kenya only in Kwale county, representing uniqueness.
	Unclear – present	Flag of Laikipia	The flag of Laikipia has a solid green field with the coat of arms as a badge on top of a white map of the county. The green represents the vegetation of the county. The coat of arms includes an elephant and a rhinoceros holding up a shield on top of two spears. A road is depicted under the shield. The shield depicts Mt. Kenya, cows in a pasture, a Moran (warrior), a hut, and a kikuyu person farming. The Moran, hut, and kikuyu person represent culture and diversity. The cows and farming represent agriculture. The spears represent defense. The road represents good infrastructure. The elephant and rhinoceros represent conservation and tourism.
	Unclear – present	Flag of Lamu	The flag's field is white with two blue wavy stripes in the base of the flag. The blue represents the ocean while the white represents peace and unity. A modified version of the county public seal is present as a badge in the upper middle of the flag. The seal is composed of a dhow in red, gold, and black with a mchongo. The dhow sits on top of green land with agricultural plants, a cow, and an antelope. The red represents the power of the people. The gold represents the wealth of the county. The green represents agriculture, pastures, and forests. The dhow has a grey railing, representing security.
	27 April 2017 – present	Flag of Machakos	The flag consists of five equal horizontal stripes starting from the top of black, blue, yellow, red, and green. A white circle containing the coat of arms is in the center of the flag. The coat of arms features feathers, symbolizing honour, a cow, symbolizing the wealth of the Kamba people, a sword, symbolizing the defense of the Kamba people, and bow and quiver with arrows, representing safety for county citizens, a three-legged stool, symbolizing respect for authority and leadership, and a horn, symbolizing the civic duty to participate in governance. The words "Kyaa Kimwe Kiyuaa Ndaa" denote unity in strength.
	Unclear – present	Flag of Makueni	The flag is a tricolour with blue at the hoist representing commitment to water provision, the center in white representing peace, and green at the fly representing agriculture and vegetation. A modified version of the county seal is in the center of the flag. The county seal features a shield on top of two arrows, representing the Akamba culture and defense of the county land. The hill below the shield represents environmental preservation. Two mangoes are located on either side of the shield, representing horticulture in the county.
	24 May 2021 – present	Flag of Mandera	The flag features a horizontal tricolor pile on top of a solid red field. The stripes of the tricolor are in black, red, and green, from top to bottom, each stripe separated by a small white band. The inner pile margin also features a small white band. The pile colours reference the colours of the Kenyan flag. The red of the field symbolizes the revolutionary change of devolution. Towards the fly of the flag there is a large heavily-fimbriated outline of a white star surrounded by eight smaller solid white stars. These nine stars represent the identification number of Mandera county in the county listings of Schedule 1 of the Constitution of Kenya, 2010.
	29 January 2015 – present	Flag of Marsabit	The flag contains three main stripes, a top and bottom stripe in jungle green representing the environment and natural resources, and a center white stripe representing peace, harmony, and coexistence. Between these stripes, there are thinner blue stripes representing the water bodies important for fishing and tourism development in the county. A lightly modified version of the county seal is present in the center of the flag. The seal contains an outline of the county, a green acacia tree representing the resilience of the inhabitants, and a cow and camel which represent wealth.
No available images of new flag	Unclear – present	Flag of Meru	The information about the current Meru county flag is currently inaccessible. Multiple acts and bills have been passed about the county flag and emblems between 2014 and 2017. The flag from 2015 was replaced at least once in 2016.
	13 January 2017 – present	Flag of Migori	The flag has a solid green field representing the county's vegetation. A white ring with black borders is in the center of the flag featuring eight evenly spaced gold stars, which represent the eight constituencies of Migori county. The stars also represent truth, hope, and divinity. The white and the black symbolize peace and the people, respectively. Inside the ring, there is a handshake, symbolizing unity.
	Unclear – present	Flag of Mombasa	The flag is a pale with blue on the outside and white on the inside.The badge is the coat of arms of the county. The coat of arms is composed of a ship steering wheel symbolizing movement towards a secure future, between two seahorses symbolizing naval defense and wealth. The seahorses support two elephant tusks symbolizing defense and the status of the county as a gateway. Above the steering wheel, the rising sun symbolizes rebirth, life, and humanity. The field of the Kenya flag is adapted into a ribbon underneath the seahorses and above the blue sea, symbolizing trade and the life source of the ocean. A twisted rope with leaves is present at the bottom of the coat of arms symbolizing the cosmopolitan nature of the population and the fertility of the land. A scroll at the top of the coat of arms bears the name of the county while a scroll at the bottom bears the motto: "Utangamano Kwa Maendeleo".
This flag displays the incorrect symbols on the shield.	29 June 2015 – present	Flag of Murang'a	The flag has three main horizontal stripes, starting at the top with black representing heritage, economic emancipation, coffee, and black gold. The middle stripe is gold, representing success and triumph. The bottom stripe is green, representing the agriculture, high forest cover, rebirth, and environmental friendliness. Each of these stripes is separated by a narrower white band, with the white signifying optimism, imagination, hope, philosophy, peace, and friendship. The coat of arms is in the center of the flag and is made up of an oval shield in front of two spears, sitting on top of mountain ranges with rivers. The rivers represent the abundance of waterways in the county and signify fertility, irrigation, and life. The mountain ranges contain the symbols of a mango, bananas, maize, and a tomato. The shield is black and green and contains the symbols of a dairy cow, a coffee plant, a tea plant, and four hands holding up a mortar and pestle (not seen here), signifying community unity.
	28 October 2013 – present	Flag of Nairobi (County)	The flag has a fly-facing fimbriated pile throughout the flag. The pile is yellow with a white margin, with the yellow pile representing forward-thinking, the leadership role of the county, and the prosperity of the county. The field of the flag is green, representing a new dawn for the city and enlightenment. The upper fly of the flag features a fly-facing golden lion as a symbol of majesty, leadership of the people, county leadership, strength, courage, and a prosperous future. The yellow pile contains a shield representing prosperity, opportunities, justice, and abundance.
The colours of the main stripes of this flag could not be confirmed.	Unclear – present	Flag of Nakuru	The flag is a horizontal tricolor with white bands separating each main stripe. There is a white oval in the center of the flag featuring two pink flamingos facing each other.
Unclear whether this flag is correct.	Unclear – present	Flag of Nandi	The information about the current Nandi county flag is currently inaccessible.
Unclear whether this flag is correct.	Unclear – present	Flag of Narok	The information about the current Narok county flag is currently inaccessible.
No available images of new flag	30 June 2017 – present	Flag of Nyamira	The current flag replaces the flag from the 2016 Nyamira county Flag, Emblems and order of Protocol Bill. As of the Nyamira County Flag, Emblems and Order of Protocol Act in 2017, the proposed flag is still incomplete. The Act states that the flag is a horizontal tricolour with yellow at the top signifying happiness, sunshine, intellect, wealth, and friendship, white in the middle signifying peace, purity, and unity, and green at the bottom, representing life and agricultural fertility. The Act also states that the flag includes tea leaves, coffee, and either bananas or a branch (egesabo) but does not specify where.
	Unclear – present	Flag of Nyandarua	The flag has a green field and unusual corner adornments. The top hoist and bottom fly corners feature a light blue wave with white fimbriation. The top fly and bottom hoist corners also feature waves, starting with a stripe of white on the inside, followed by a stripe of light blue, and lastly black. The county emblem figures as a badge on the flag. The emblem is composed of two elephants holding up a central gold ring. The ring contains a depiction of a landscape which includes a sheep, a cow, a waterfall, and a hippopotamus in water. There is also a bird and three white flowers in the foreground. The name of the county is inscribed at the top of the gold ring. A golden ribbon at the bottom of the ring includes the motto "Pamoja Tujijenge".
	27 November 2020 – present	Flag of Nyeri	The flag features three main equal horizontal stripes of blue, green, and brown from top to bottom. The blue represents the sky, as well as the abilities and aspirations of inhabitants of Nyeri. The green symbolizes the tranquility and ambience of the environment. The brown represents the kikuyu culture and the fertility of the land. Each main stripe is separated by a thinner white stripe, with the colour representing peace and neutrality. The center of the flag features the seal of the county. The seal features Mt. Kenya, which has cultural significance to the Agikuyu, various resources (tea, coffee, cabbages, tomatoes, a cow), two bongo antelopes to represent tourism, and five stars representing the heroes and heroines from the county.
	29 July 2015 – present	Flag of Samburu	The flag is composed of two thick horizontal stripes in blue and red separated by a thinner white stripe in the center. The blue and red represent the colours of the attire of the Samburu Moran (warrior). The shield in the center is a symbol of security and tradition. The head of a cow is depicted on the shield, symbolizing wealth and past heritage. The necklace under the shield symbolizes traditional culture. The maize under the shield is a staple food of the community and features on the flag as an opportunity for economic growth. A man and woman stand on both sides of the shield in the traditional attire of the Samburu community.
This flag flies in the assembly of Siaya county but its validity is unknown.	Unclear – present	Flag of Siaya	There is currently conflicting information about which county flag is correct. An initial flag featuring a stool and sitatunga is recorded from the 2013 Siaya County Flag and Other Symbols Bill. However, the flag in the assembly displays flowers, fishing rods, and tilapia. Another bill about the county's flag and symbols is recorded from 2016, though it is unclear whether this bill changed the flag design.
	Unclear – present	Flag of Taita-Taveta	The flag is a diagonal bicolor with orange in the top hoist and green in the bottom fly. The green symbolizes nature, fertility, life, self-respect, well-being, learning, growth, and harmony. The orange represents the energy and stimulation of red and the cheerfulness of yellow, as well as enthusiasm, creativity, mineral richness, bright futures, and the sun. The two complementary colours represent the regions making up the county: Taita and Taveta. A thin white stripe separates the two main colours, with the white representing peace and unity. A circle with a white border, concentric green, yellow, and orange rings, and the coat of arms, is in the center of the flag. The coat of arms is a black and green shield with two spears and two elephants. The coat of arms features the motto "Wumweri ni ndighi, Bhaisanga ni kifumwa". The black represents Africa and Kenya.
This flag is missing the thin black bands between the main three stripes.	16 July 2015 – present	Flag of Tana River	The flag has a white gusset situated between a top red stripe and a bottom dark green stripe. A thin black band separates the red from the white, and the white from the green. The red represents the pioneering spirit and leadership of the county. The white represents fairness and neutrality. The dark green represents persistence and strength in the face of adversity. The black represents discipline and independence. The coat of arms is located on the hoist side of the flag, where the white stripe is wider. The coat of arms features a guinea fowl, an African bull, a white colobus monkey (not seen here), a shield, a mango tree, a banana plant, maize, the Tana river, a black ribbon, and the county name. The African bull represents the traditional lifestyle of residents of the county. The white colobus monkey represents tourism. The shield represents patriotism towards the Republic of Kenya. The banana plant represents fertile land. The maize represents the potential of the county as an agricultural center. The black ribbon represents self-sufficiency and freedom.
No available images of new flag	8 January, 2021 – present	Flag of Tharaka Nithi	The flag features three main stripes starting at the top with green symbolizing abundance and virility, blue in the middle, symbolizing tranquility and water, and brown in the bottom, symbolizing the land and natural resources. Thinner white stripes separate these three coloured stripes, with the white representing transparency and peace. A yellow circle featuring the coat of arms is present in the center of the flag. The yellow represents prosperity and happiness. The coat of arms is composed of concentric red, green, and black circles representing unity in the African community, in front of two spears representing the defense of cultural heritage. The circle is split into quadrants of yellow, black, white, and red. Inside the quadrants are an elephant, coffee beans, tea leaves, and sorghum. Mt. Kenya is pictured above the concentric circles.
This flag is incorrect and should show the Trans-Nzoia emblem in the place of the badge on this flag. The name at the top of the flag should also be removed.	Unclear – present	Flag of Trans-Nzoia	The flag is of an unusual design, with a right trapezoid on the hoist side of the flag. The body of the trapezoid is green, representing positive and forward thinking, and nurturing the self and others. The inside margin of the trapezoid has a brown band representing material security and wealth. This band is fimbriated inside and outside by thinner white bands. The field of the flag is golden yellow, representing the development of new ideas. The county emblem is in the center of the flag and is made up of a yellow and black shield held up by two Sitatunga antelopes on either side. Ribbons are on the top and bottom of the shield with the text "Trans Nzoia" and the county motto "Unity in Diversity" respectively, in capital letters. The shield is split into three sections. The bottom half of the shield depicts Mt. Elgon, a maize plant, and a tea bud. The top left quarter depicts a tractor in a farm and a cork wheel. The top right quarter depicts an eight-stringed Litungu and a traditional Quad. The shield represents protection for food security, social diversity, and industrial achievements. The cork wheel symbolizes a hope for industrial revolution. The Litungu and traditional Quad represent the county's traditions. Mt. Elgon and the Sitatunga represent the scenery of the county.
	24 January 2014 – present	Flag of Turkana	The flag has a sky blue field with a dark brown base. A diagonal band of green runs across the bottom fly corner of the flag. The green band is fimbriated with thin white strips. The center of the flag features a white shield on top of two black and white spears.
Unclear whether this flag is correct.	Unclear – present	Flag of Uasin Gishu	This flag is an amended version of the flag previously adopted in 2013 which adds the words "County Government of Uasin Gichu" on the emblem of the flag. The flag features a horizontal tricolour starting with green at the top symbolizing the land, the economy, agriculture, tourism, and natural resources, white in the middle symbolizing peace, harmony, and unity, and golden at the bottom representing wheat and the status of the county as a breadbasket of Kenya. The badge of the flag is a modified version of the county coat of arms. The coat of arms features a shield on top of two spears, being held up by an athlete on the left, and a giraffe on the right. The shield and spear symbolize security. The shield bears three stripes with a river, maize, and wheat from top to bottom.
	19 November 2014 – present	Flag of Vihiga	The flag has a fly-facing pile through the flag. The background of the flag is green, representing the county's natural resources. The pile is composed of a small brown triangle inside a larger yellowish golden chevron. Each segment of the pile is fimbriated by a thinner white stripe. A second flag in pall format featuring a coat of arms also exists. It is unclear whether there is documentation of legal proceedings behind this other flag or whether this flag is official.
	Unclear – present	Flag of Wajir	The flag features three main horizontal bands starting from the top with tawny brown, followed by white, followed by emerald green. The middle white band is wider than the other two bands.The top and bottom bands are fimbriated internally by one thin golden yellow stripe each. A golden yellow crescent moon features in the center of the flag inside the center white band.
This flag is incorrect and the shield should be of an oval shape.	Unclear – present	Flag of West Pokot	The flag features an unusual layout. The main field features three vertical columns of green, white, and green. However, the two outer green stripes have yellow piles facing the outsides of the flag rather than the inside. The green symbolizes vegetation and pastures. The yellow symbolizes achievement and success. The white represents peace. A modified version of the county coat of arms is in the center of the flag. The coat of arms is composed of an oval shield on top of two spears. The shield represents prosperity, opportunities, justice, and abundance. The spears represent protection for its people. The shield contains depictions of a blue Mt. Mtelo and a cow inside a yellow circle.

== Former county flags ==
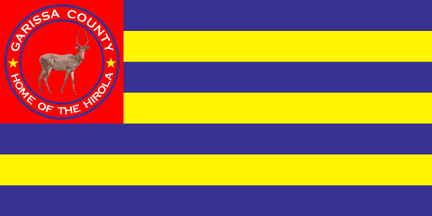
Former Flag of Garissa

Former Flag of Kiambu

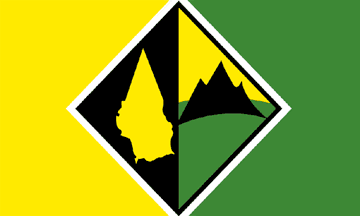
Former Flag of Kirinyaga

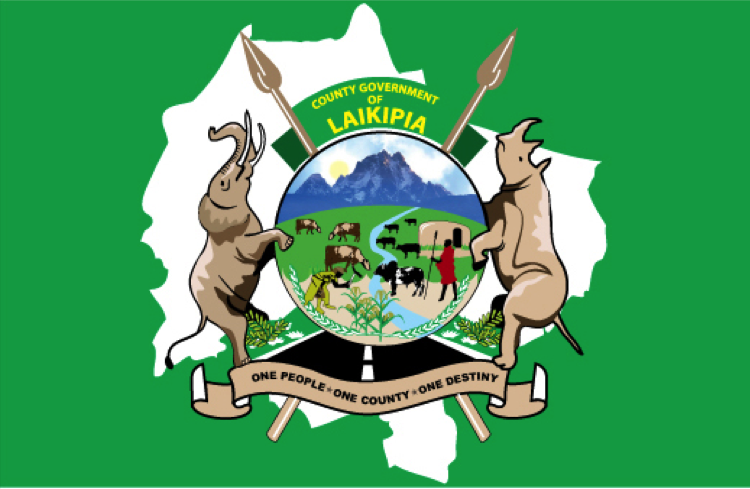
Former Flag of Laikipia

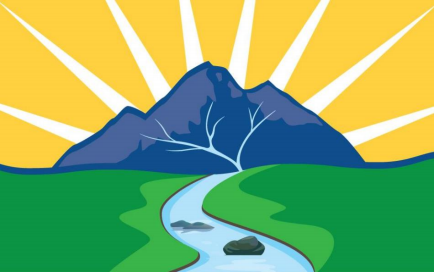
Former Flag of Meru (2015–2016)

Former Flag of Nyamira (2016–2017)

== See also ==
- Coat of arms of Kenya
- Counties of Kenya
- Flag of Kenya
