= Queen of Kenya =

Elizabeth II's reign in Kenya from 1963 to 1964

- Coat of arms of Kenya

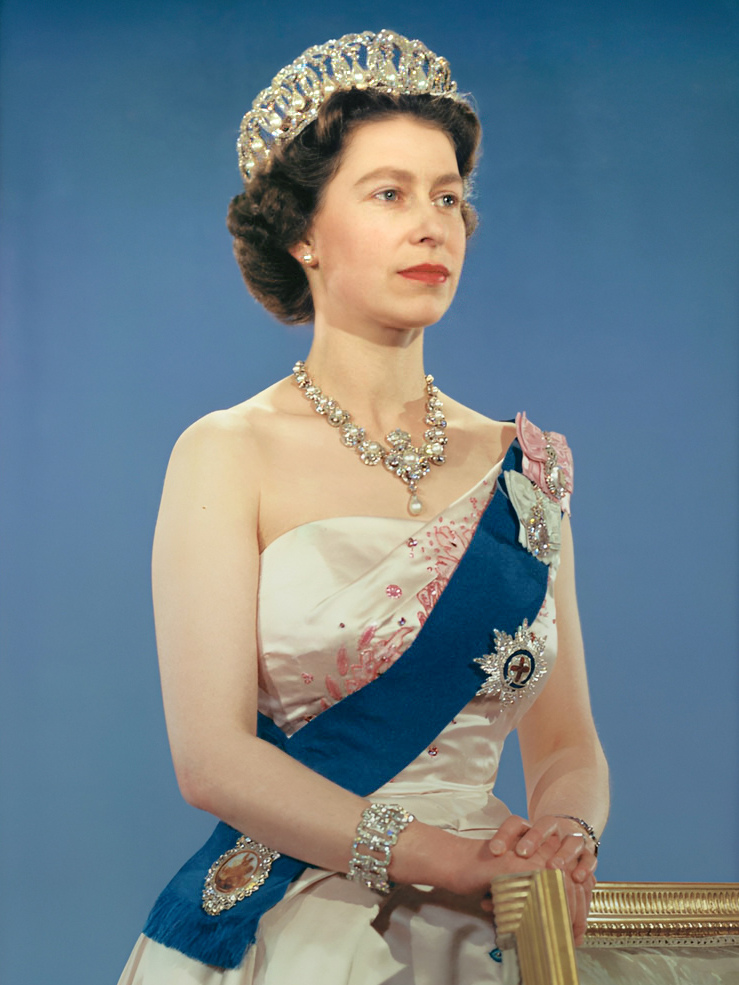
- Elizabeth II

Details
- Style: Her Majesty
- Formed: 12 December 1963
- Abolished: 12 December 1964

Elizabeth II was Queen of Kenya from 1963 to 1964, when Kenya was an independent sovereign state with a constitutional monarchy. She was also the sovereign of the other Commonwealth realms, including the United Kingdom. Her roles as the Kenyan head of state were delegated to the governor-general of Kenya.

== History ==
The Kenya Independence Act 1963 transformed the Colony and Protectorate of Kenya into an independent sovereign state, with Queen Elizabeth II as the head of state and Queen of Kenya. Prince Philip, Duke of Edinburgh, represented the Queen of Kenya at the independence celebrations. The Duke opened the first session of the Kenyan Parliament, on behalf of the Queen, by delivering the speech from the throne on 13 December 1963.

The Queen's constitutional roles were mostly delegated to the Governor-General of Kenya, her representative in Kenya, who was appointed by the Queen on the advice of her Kenyan Prime Minister. Malcolm MacDonald was governor-general throughout. All bills required Royal assent. All executive powers of Kenya were vested in the monarch, but were mostly exercised by the governor-general on her behalf.

Kenya adopted a new constitution in 1964 which abolished the monarchy and the office of governor-general, and became a republic within the Commonwealth with the president of Kenya as head of state.

== Visits ==
Elizabeth was in Kenya at Treetops Hotel when her father, George VI, died on 6 February 1952 and she became queen. She had arrived in Nairobi on 1 February and had been staying at Sagana Lodge, near Mount Kenya. After the news of her accession, she returned immediately to the United Kingdom via Entebbe Airport. The Mombasa tusks, which compose a monument on Moi Avenue in Mombasa, were initially built to commemorate the Queen's 1952 visit.

After Kenya became a republic, the Queen stopped briefly in the country on 26 March 1972 and 7 October 1991. She undertook a state visit to Kenya 10–14 November 1983, as the guest of President Daniel Arap Moi.

== Royal style and titles ==
The proclamation of the Queen's style and titles published in the Kenya Gazette

Elizabeth II had the following style and titles in her role as the monarch of Kenya:

- 12 December 1963 – 10 March 1964: Elizabeth the Second, by the Grace of God, of the United Kingdom of Great Britain and Northern Ireland and of Her other Realms and Territories Queen, Head of the Commonwealth, Defender of the Faith
- 10 March 1964 – 12 December 1964: Elizabeth the Second, Queen of Kenya and of Her other Realms and Territories, Head of the Commonwealth
