= John Krop Lonyangapuo =

Kenyan politician

Professor John Krop Lonyang'apuo
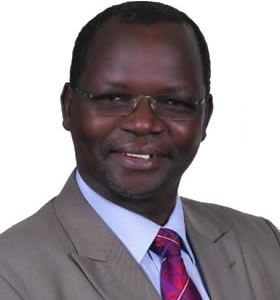

2nd Governor of West Pokot County
- In office 9 August 2017 – 25 August 2022
- Preceded by: Simon Kachapin
- Succeeded by: Simon Kachapin

Senator of West Pokot County
- In office 28 March 2013 – 8 August 2017
- Succeeded by: Samuel Poghisio

Permanent Secretary of the Government of Kenya
- In office 2008–2010

Personal details
- Born: 10 December 1964 (age 61) Kanyarkwat, West Pokot District, Kenya
- Party: Kenya Union Party

Prof. John Krop Lonyang'apuo (born 10 December 1964) is a Kenyan politician. He was the former Permanent Secretary for Ministry of Industrialization (2008–2010), under the Leadership of President Mwai Kibaki. He is an active member and party leader of Kenya Union Party at the National Level. He served as the governor of West Pokot county from 2017 to 2022 after serving as the Senator from 2013 to 2017.

== Life and career ==
Lonyang'apuo was born in Kanyarkwat, West Pokot County, Kenya. He attended St Mary's School Yala, Nyanza for his secondary education after which he completed his undergraduate studies at Egerton University Kenya where he obtained Bachelor of Science in Pure Mathematics and later on did his graduate studies at the University of Leeds, UK where he obtained his PhD in Applied Mathematics.

He was a member of the Kenyan Senate representing West Pokot County from March 4, 2013 to August 8, 2017 having been elected on a KANU Party ticket.

In April 2019, Lonyangapuo became a social media and news sensation across Kenya after a video of him attacking a Mr. Ruto Kapchok surfaced online. The video which was later widely shared across social media platforms shows an irritated and irate Lonyangapuo addressing his constituents in Makutano, Kapenguria, the capital of West Pokot County where he humorously referred to Mr. Kapchok as "Kijana Fupi Round". The saga brought the otherwise moderately known governor to the limelight with his "kijana Fupi" utterances quickly becoming a national talking point which even drew remarks from both the President and his Deputy.
