= Kenya (1963–1964) =

Sovereign state in east Africa from 1963 to 1964

- 1963–1964
- Flag Coat of arms
- Motto: "Harambee" (Swahili) "Let us all pull together"
- Anthem: Ee Mungu Nguvu Yetu; English: "O God of All Creation"
- Capital: Nairobi
- Common languages: English; Swahili
- Government: Federal parliamentary constitutional monarchy
- Queen
  - 1963–1964: Elizabeth II
- Governor-General
  - 1963–1964: Malcolm MacDonald
- Prime Minister
  - 1963–1964: Jomo Kenyatta
- Legislature: National Assembly
  - Upper House: Senate
  - Lower House: House of Representatives
- Historical era: Cold War
  - Independence: 12 December 1963
  - Republic: 12 December 1964
- Currency: East African shilling
Preceded by	Succeeded by
Kenya Colony	Kenya

The Commonwealth realm of Kenya was a short-lived sovereign state between 12 December 1963 and 12 December 1964 whose head of state was Queen Elizabeth II. It was a predecessor to the Republic of Kenya.

== History ==
When British Kenya became independent on 12 December 1963, Elizabeth II remained head of state as Queen of Kenya (and of the United Kingdom and many former colonies). The monarch's constitutional roles were mostly delegated to the Governor-General of Kenya, Malcolm John Macdonald.

Jomo Kenyatta held office as prime minister (and head of government). Elizabeth II had visited Kenya on 6 February 1952, before independence, and later visited the Republic of Kenya several times.

The Republic of Kenya came into existence on 12 December 1964, while remaining in the Commonwealth by common consent of other governments. Following the abolition of the monarchy, Jomo Kenyatta became the first President of the Republic of Kenya.
