= Samuel Poghisio =

Kenyan politician (born 1958)

Samuel Losuron Poghisi

Majority Leader of the Senate
- In office 11 May 2020 – 8 August 2022

Senator for West Pokot County
- In office 31 August 2017 – 8 August 2022

Personal details
- Born: 1958 (age 67–68) West Pokot County, Kenya
- Party: KANU
- Profession: Politician

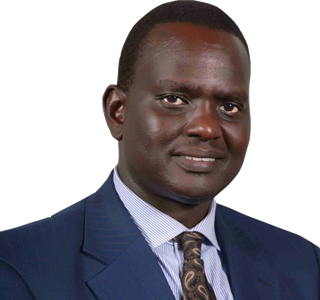
Samuel Losuron Poghisio

Samuel Losuron Poghisio is a Kenyan politician who served as the Majority Leader of the Kenyan Senate.He belongs to the Kenya African National Union - KANU and was previously a member of the United Republican Party - URP and the Orange Democratic Movement-Kenya and was elected to represent the Kacheliba Constituency in the National Assembly of Kenya since the 2007 Kenyan parliamentary election.

He was first elected to the parliament in 1988, and also in 1997 and 2002. Until 2007 elections he represented the KANU party.

His Kacheliba Constituency parliamentary seat was taken over by Mark Lomunokol in the 2013 elections having opted to vie for the Senatorial seat unsuccessfully.

He served as the Senator for West Pokot County from 2017 - 2022.
