= Francis Polisi Loile Lotodo =

Kenyan politician

Francis Polisi Loile Lotodo was a Kenyan Politician and a Member of Parliament for Pokot West, which was later changed to Kapenguria Constituency in West Pokot County.

== Politics ==
He served from 1988 when the constituency was created until 1990 when he was arrested and detained losing his seat. He was re-elected in the 1992 General Elections and served till 1997 General Elections. He also served as Cabinet Minister in Charge of Ministry of Energy.

== Death ==
Hon. Lotodo died in South Africa in November 2000 undergoing treatment battling esophagus cancer. He died while serving as the member of parliament for Kapenguria Constituency.
