= Samuel Moroto =

Kenyan politician

Samuel Chumel Moroto (born 1960) is a Kenyan politician. He represents Kapenguria Constituency in the Kenyan National Assembly of the Kenyan parliament. He belongs to the Kenya African National Union (KANU) party. He is a career teacher and trade unionist. He was first elected to parliament in 2002. He hails from the Pokot community which mainly inhabits West Pokot County.

== Early life and education ==
He is a teacher by profession. Between 1983 and 1988, he served as an untrained teacher. He was promoted to the level of deputy headteacher in 1989 and to that of headteacher in 1995. Moroto is currently an pursuing a Bachelor of Arts at Daystar University.

== KNUT trade-unionism ==
In 1996, Moroto was elected to the position of Kenya National Union of Teachers (KNUT) chairman, West Pokot branch. He was elected again in 1999 for the position of branch executive secretary.

== Political career ==
He was first elected as an MP in the 2001 Kapenguria by-election occasioned by the death of the then MP, Francis Polisi Lotodo. He was re-elected in the 2002 Kenyan general elections. In 2006, Moroto was appointed by president Mwai Kibaki to the position of assistant minister, Ministry of Public Health and Sanitation.

Moroto lost the 2007 elections to Reverend Murgor mainly due to an ODM wave that swept the Rift valley region. He however bounced back in the 4 March 2013, general elections by defeating his closest opponent by a margin of more than 500 votes.

== Chepchoina settlement scheme ==
Moroto has consistently championed for the settlement of Pokot squatters in the controversial Chepchoina settlement scheme. The scheme has however been plagued by wrangles over who the genuine squatters are. It has seen confrontations between squatters from Pokot, Sabaot, Bukusu and Turkana communities.
