= Pokot South Constituency =

Electoral constituency in Kenya

Pokot South
- constituency for the Parliament of Kenya
- Pokot South Constituency within West Pokot County

- West Pokot County within Kenya
- County: West Pokot County
- Population: 80,661
- Area: 537 km^{2} (207.3 sq mi)

Current constituency
- Number of members: 1
- Party: KUP
- Member of Parliament: David Pkosing
- Wards: 4

Pokot South Constituency is an electoral constituency in Kenya. It is one of the four constituencies in West Pokot County. The constituency was established in 2010, ahead of the 2013 General Elections. The current Member of Parliament for Pokot South Constituency is Hon. David Pkosing Losiakou who was elected on a Kenya Union Party ticket. The Pokot South Constituency borders Sigor Constituency to the East, Kapenguria Constituency to the North and West, and Elgeyo-Marakwet County to the South.

The Constituency was curved out of Sigor Constituency in West Pokot County.

== Members of Parliament ==
Election	MP	Party	Notes
Pokot South Constituency created from Sigor
2013	David Pkosing Losiakou	URP	
2017	David Pkosing Losiakou	JP	
2022	David Pkosing Losiakou	KUP	

== List of Wards ==
Name	Area in Sq. km (Approx)	Population (Approx)
Chepareria	149.00	41,563
Batei	163.00	30,773
Lelan	130.00	33,527
Tapach	205.20	26,237
TOTAL	647.20	132,100
