= Coats of arms of Kenyan counties =

The list shows coat of arms for the forty-seven counties of Kenya. Some counties adopted the coat of arms of the defunct district governments. Other coat of arms adopted in the year after the first county governments came into power which was between March 4, 2013 to the same date on 2014. As of Dec 17th 2014 not all county assemblies have passed the design of the county coat of arms. It is expected that all counties will adopt their own flags soon.

Some counties have both a coat of arms and a seal, because of history even though the coat of arms of some counties look like a seal, they aren't seals unless specified by the respective county governments. There are also counties that use their logos as coat of arms.

== Coat of arms ==
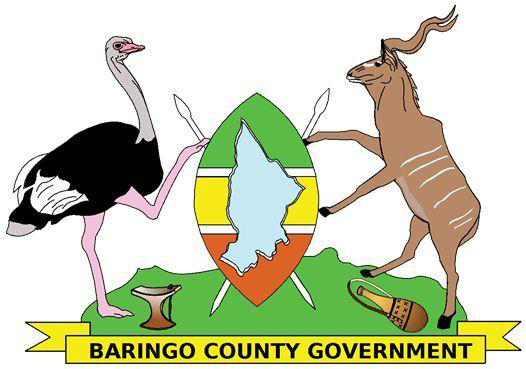
Coat of Arms of Baringo

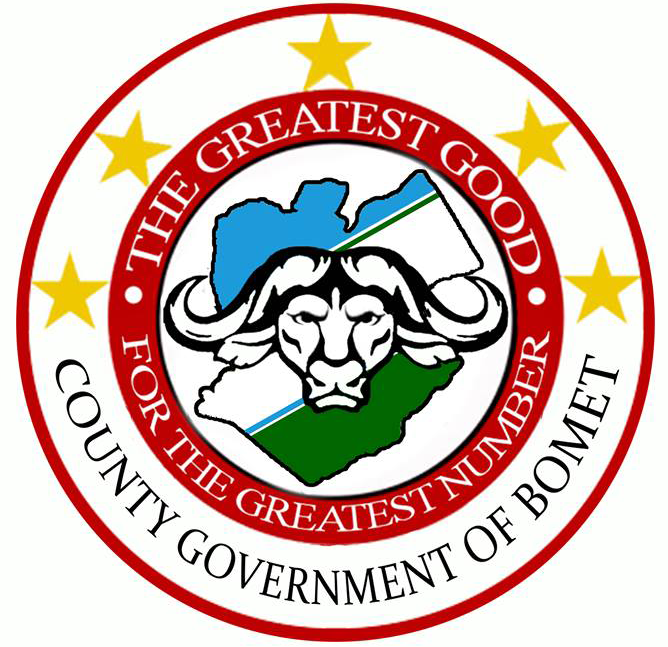
Coat of Arms of Bomet

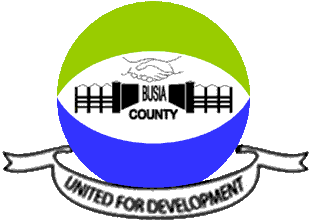
Coat of Arms of Busia

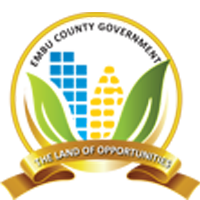
Coat of Arms of Embu

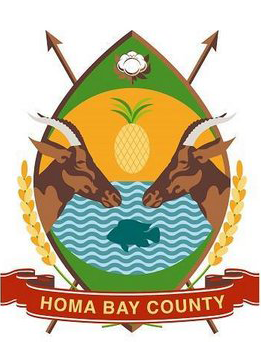
Coat of Arms of Homa Bay

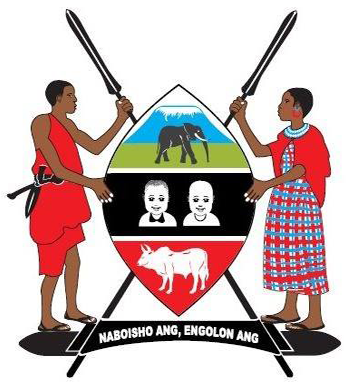
Coat of Arms of Kajiado

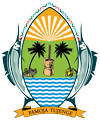
Coat of Arms of Kilifi

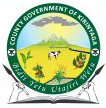
Coat of Arms of Kirinyaga

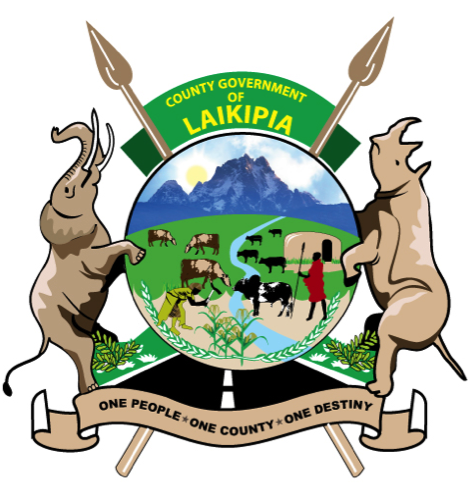
Coat of Arms of Laikipia

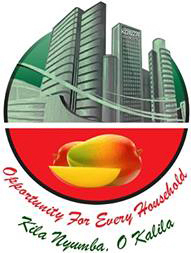
Coat of Arms of Makueni

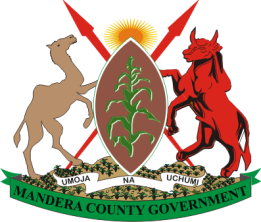
Coat of Arms of Mandera

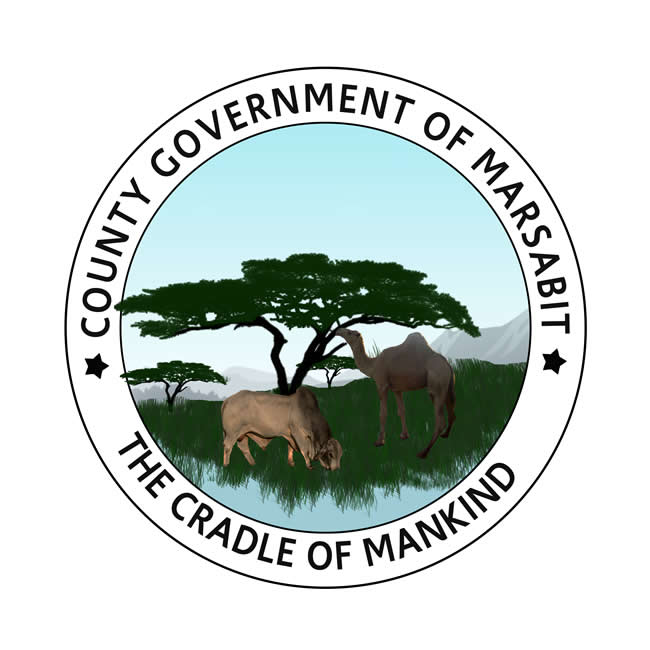
Coat of Arms of Marsabit

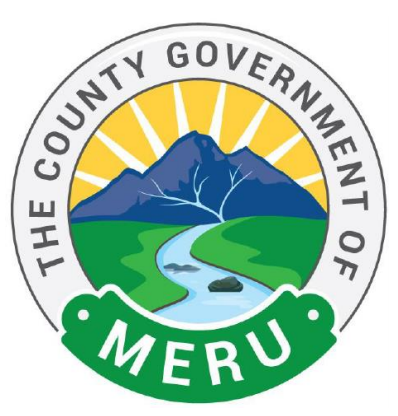
Coat of Arms of Meru

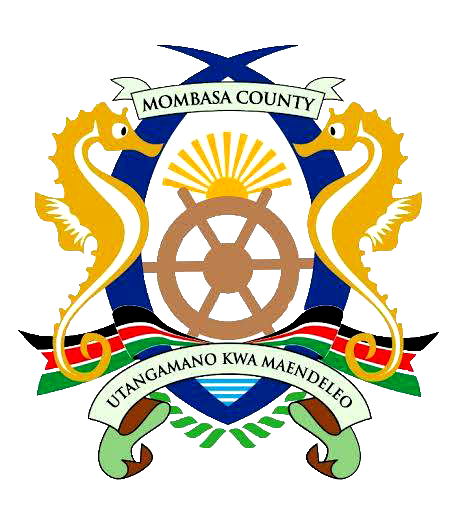
Coat of Arms of Mombasa

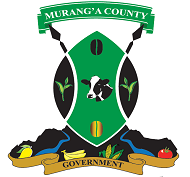
Coat of Arms of Muranga

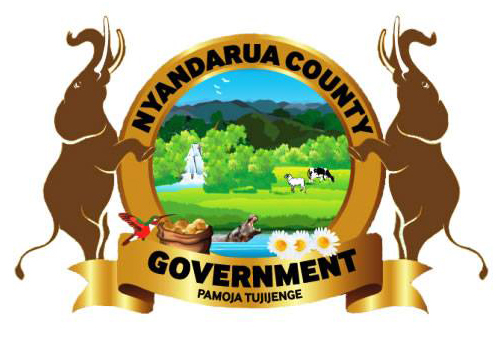
Coat of Arms of Nyandarua

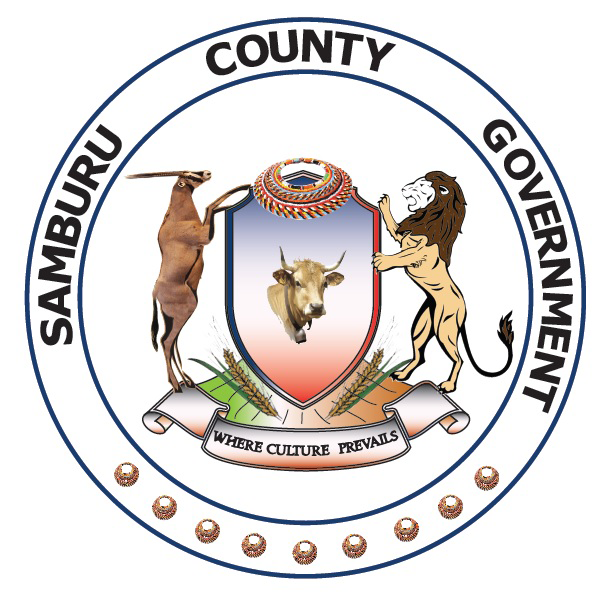
Coat of Arms of Samburu

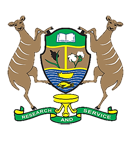
Coat of Arms of Siaya

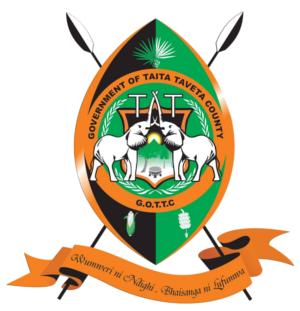
Coat of Arms of Taita Taveta

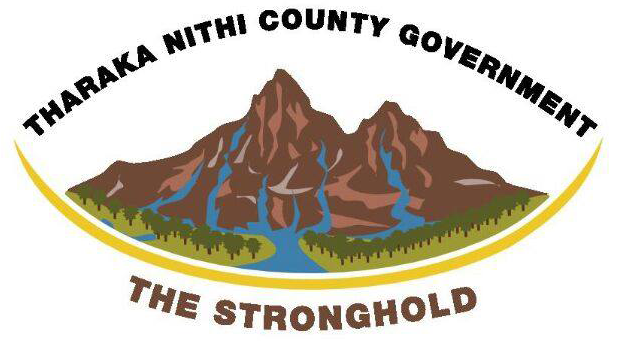
Coat of Arms of Tharaka-Nithi

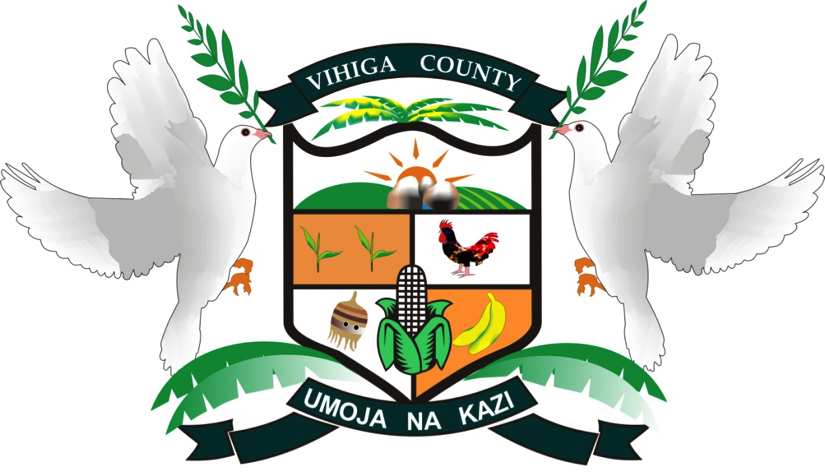
Coat of Arms of Vihiga

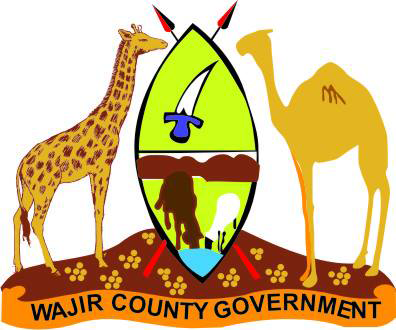
Coat of Arms of Wajir

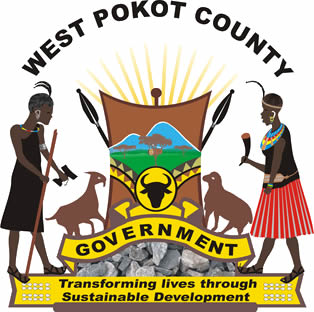
Coat of Arms of West Pokot
Coat of Arms of Nairobi

== Seals ==
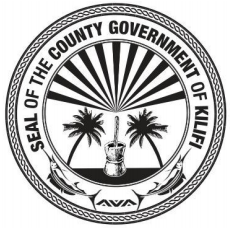
Seal of Kilifi

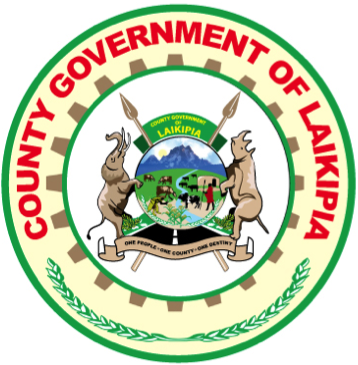
Seal of Laikipia

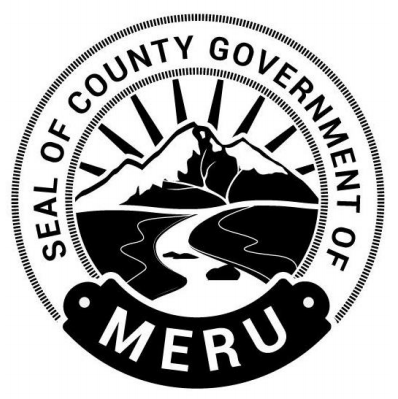
Seal of Meru

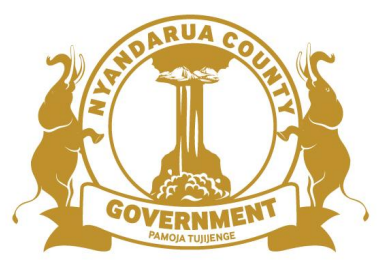
Seal of Nyandarua

== Logos ==
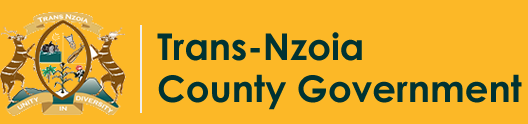
Logo of Trans-Nzoia

== See also ==
- Flags of the Counties of Kenya
