= Moi Avenue =

Moi Avenue may refer to:

- Moi Avenue (Nairobi)
- Moi Avenue (Mombasa)
