= Julius Murgor =

Kenyan politician

Recha Julius Murgor is a Kenyan politician. He belongs to the United Democratic Alliance and was elected to represent the Kapenguria Constituency in the National Assembly of Kenya in the 2007 Kenyan parliamentary election, later being elected 3rd Senator for West Pokot County in 2017.

He is the chair of the Kenyan Senate Committee on Labour and Social Welfare.
