= Mukhisa Kituyi =

Kenyan politician

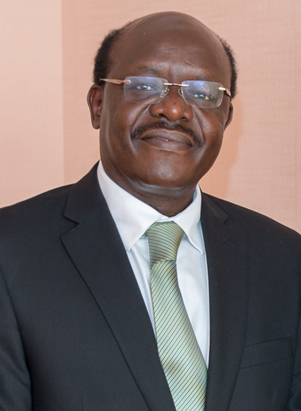
- Kituyi in 2013

Secretary-General of the United Nations Conference on Trade and Development
- In office 1 September 2013 – 15 February 2021
- Preceded by: Supachai Panitchpakdi
- Succeeded by: Isabelle Durant (Acting)

Minister of Trade and Industry of Kenya
- In office 2002–2007
- President: Mwai Kibaki
- Preceded by: Nicholas Biwott
- Succeeded by: Uhuru Kenyatta

Personal details
- Born: Mukhisa Kituyi; October 20, 1956 (age 69) Kenya
- Party: New Ford Kenya (formerly Ford-Kenya, Narc-Kenya)
- Spouse: Ling Kituyi
- Children: 4 (including late Ivar Makari Kituyi)
- Education: Makerere University (BA); University of Bergen (MPhil, PhD)
- Occupation: Politician, Economist

Dr. Mukhisa Kituyi (born October 20, 1956) is a Kenyan politician who served as Secretary-General of the United Nations Conference on Trade and Development, UNCTAD from September 2013 to February 2021 when he stepped down to run for the Kenyan Presidency. Prior to joining UNCTAD, Kituyi was Chief Executive of the Kenya Institute of Governance, based in Nairobi. He served as Kenya's Minister of Trade and Industry from 2002 to 2007. He dropped his presidential bid in March 2022 to support former Prime Minister Raila Odinga. He began his education at Mbakalo DEB primary school.

== Education and early career ==
He started his Primary Education at Mbakalo DEB Primary School in Mbakalo Ward. After attending St. Mary's School in Yala, Kenya, Kituyi obtained a BA in Political Science and International Relations from Makerere University in Kampala, Uganda, graduating with honours and a PhD in Social Anthropology, a Master of Philosophy in Development Studies and a Diploma in Science, Comparative Production Systems, all from the University of Bergen, Norway.

Prior to joining Parliament, Kituyi worked as director at the African Centre for Technology Studies (ACTS), Nairobi and as Programme Officer at the Norwegian Agency for International Development (NORAD), also in Nairobi.

He was elected to the Kenyan Parliament in 1992, and was twice re-elected. He was Kenya's Minister of Trade and Industry from 2002 to 2007. During this period, Kituyi chaired for two years the Council of Ministers of the Common Market for Eastern and Southern Africa (COMESA) and the African Trade Ministers' Council.

He also served as chairman of the Council of Ministers of the African, Caribbean and Pacific (ACP) Group of States, and was lead negotiator for Eastern and Southern African ministers during the European Union-ACP Economic Partnership Agreement negotiations. He was convenor of the agriculture negotiations carried out at the World Trade Organization's Sixth Ministerial Conference held in Hong Kong, China in 2005.

From 2008 to 2012, Kituyi was a member of a team of experts advising the presidents of the nations of the East African Community on how to establish more effective regional economic links.

From 2011 to 2012, he was a consultant for the African Union Commission, where he helped to develop the structure for a pan-African free trade area.

Immediately prior to becoming Secretary-General, Kituyi was Chief Executive of the Kenya Institute of Governance, based in Nairobi. The Institute is a think tank and advocacy organization that focuses on linking academic research and the development of public policy.

During 2012, Kituyi also served as a non-resident fellow of the Africa Growth Initiative of the Brookings Institution, Washington, D.C. He was a resident scholar there in 2011.

== Politics ==
He was first elected to Parliament on a Ford-Kenya ticket in 1992, becoming the Opposition Chief Whip. His predecessor was the late veteran politician, Elijah Mwangale. He was re-elected in 1997 and 2002. However, in the 2007 General Elections, he lost to newcomer David Simiyu Eseli of Ford-Kenya.

Kituyi left Ford-Kenya and joined Narc-Kenya and later New Ford Kenya, a breakaway party formed by cabinet minister Soita Shitanda.

== Other activities ==
- International Gender Champions (IGC), Member

== Personal life ==
Kituyi is married to Ling Kituyi and they have four children. Ivar Makari Kituyi, Sitati Kituyi, Laila Kituyi and Thor Masaule Kituyi. On June 28, 2015, Ivar Makari Kituyi died at the age of 30. He suffered a diabetic attack. Ivar was buried at his father's Mbakalo Tongaren Constituency home. Siblings, Solomon Kituyi
