= Wilson Litole =

Kenyan politician

Wilson Litole was a Kenyan politician. He belonged to the Orange Democratic Movement and was elected to represent the Sigor Constituency in the National Assembly of Kenya since the 2007 Kenyan parliamentary election. Wilson Litole died on 7 October 2016.
