= Kacheliba Constituency =

Electoral constituency in Kenya

Kacheliba
- constituency for the Parliament of Kenya

Current constituency
- Created: 1988
- Party: Party of Development and Reforms
- MP: Mark Lomunokol

Kacheliba Constituency is an electoral constituency in Kenya. It is one of the four constituencies of West Pokot County. The constituency has six wards, which are represented by Members of County Assembly at the West Pokot County Assembly in Kapenguria. The constituency was established before the 1988 elections in order to cater for the interests of the Kara-Pokot community following years of under representation. The constituency was created by the Electoral Commission of Kenya through a publication in the Kenya Gazette.

Historically, Kacheliba constituency was part of the Northern Frontier District of Kenya. The constituency, along with the rest of West Pokot County and Turkana County were transferred from the Uganda Protectorate to Kenya Colony by the British colonial government in 1926.

== Members of Parliament ==
Elections	MP	Party	Notes
1988	Samuel Poghisio	KANU	One-party system.
1990	Peter L. Nang’ole	KANU	By-elections, One-party system.
1992	Peter L. Nang’ole	KANU	One- party system
1997	Samuel Poghisio	KANU	
2002	Samuel Poghisio	KANU	
2007	Samuel Poghisio	ODM-K	
2013	Mark Lomunokol	URP	
2017	Mark Lomunokol	PDR	
2022	TITUS LOTEE	[KUP]	

== County Assembly Wards ==
Kacheliba Constituency is made up of six wards, all located within West Pokot County.

Ward	Population (2009 Census)	Area ( km^{2})	Sub-Counties
Suam	22,223	393.10	Kanyerus, Kopulio, Nakuyen, Karon, Kacheliba and Nge'nge'chwa
Kodich	22,539	283.80	Lokichar, Orolwo, Kalemngorok, Kodich, Cherangan and Karameri
Kasei	14,765	782.50	Kasei, Kamketo, Karokou, Sirwach, Korpu, Kachawa, Kaptolomwo, Ompolion, Kamunono
Kapchok	24,684	438.20	Konyao and Kapyen
Kiwawa	28,235	938.60	Kases, Kiwawa, Chelopoy, Kauriong, Mbaru, Lopet, Chepropogh, Pcholio and Kamunai
Alale	43,565	1,020.00	Kopito, Lorsuk, Apuke, Kola, Kodii, Akoret, Alale, Naruoro, Amakuriat, Kalapata, Mekuyo, Lotukum, Nauyapong, Lokitonyala and Sasak

*September 2005.
