= Simon Kachapin =

Kenyan politician

1st & 3rd Governor of West Pokot County
- In office 2013–2017
- Preceded by: Post established
- Succeeded by: John Lonyangapuo
- Incumbent
- Assumed office 25 August 2022
- Preceded by: John Lonyangapuo

Personal details
- Born: 1967 (age 58–59) Sigor, Kenya
- Party: United Democratic Alliance (2022–present)

Simon Kachapin (born 1967 in Sigor, Kenya) is a Kenyan politician. He was the 1st governor of West Pokot County in Kenya. Kachapin is a member of the United Democratic Alliance. He was elected into office in 2013 during the Kenya general elections.

== Education ==
Born in 1967, Governor Kachapin holds a bachelor's degree in Education Moi University, Eldoret. He attended Ortum Boys High School and later Chewoyet High School for his A-Level examinations. He is currently pursuing a master's degree in Advanced leadership and accountability at the University of Nairobi.

== Political career ==
Governor Kachapin's political journey dates back to when he was elected as the first Governor of West Pokot County in 2013. He held this position until 2017 and worked tirelessly to improve the livelihoods of his people. During his first term, he prioritized healthcare reforms and played a significant role in enhancing education in the region. His efforts led to the establishment of the first-ever tertiary institution, the Kenya Medical Training College (KMTC) - Kapenguria Campus, the Kapenguria Early Childhood Development Education College (ECDE), and Keringet ultra-modern structure, which housed the Kisii University. This provided opportunities for further education and early childhood development.

In addition to his focus on education and healthcare, H.E. Kachapin contributed to the transformation of the agricultural sector. He played a pivotal role in the introduction of the Nasukuta Abattoir, a vital facility for the livestock industry. Furthermore, his administration initiated the construction of various infrastructural developments that changed the face of the county. He also opened up thousands of kilometers of roads, including the historical Kriich road, where no road was in existence since independence, and area residents had never seen a vehicle. This contributed to improved security, promoted economic activities, and added value across the county.

To boost economic prospects, he spearheaded the process of building the modern Makutano Market and fresh produce markets across the county to enhance fair trade and business. He also initiated the proposed Kopoch International Hotel to boost the tourism sector in the region.

One of the key milestones during his term as Governor was his dedication to supporting the less privileged. Governor Kachapin became the first Governor to allocate bursary funds to support the education of needy children, thereby investing in the future of West Pokot County.

After completing his initial five-year term as Governor, H.E. Simon Kachapin served as the Chief Administrative Secretary (CAS) for Energy and Education State departments.
