= St. Mary's School, Yala =

St. Mary’s School Yala

Location
- Yala Township, Nyanza Province; Kenya
- Coordinates: 0°05′48″N 34°31′54″E

Information
- Type: Public
- Motto: Shine in everything everywhere
- Religious affiliation: Roman Catholicism
- Established: 1927; 99 years ago
- Founder: Mill Hill missionaries
- Principal: Victor Makanda
- Staff: 40
- Grades: K-12
- Gender: Boys
- Enrolment: c. 2000
- Education system: 8-4-4 Curriculum
- Colours: Black and white
- Website: stmarysyala.ac.ke

St. Mary’s School Yala is a Roman Catholic primary and secondary school for boys located on the Kisumu-Busia highway in Yala Township in the Nyanza Province of Western Kenya.

Founded in 1927 by the Mill Hill missionaries notably Msgr. Brandsma who wanted to start a teachers' college for catholic schools, the school opened its doors in 1927 making it one of the oldest schools in Kenya.

The school eventually evolved to become a full primary school and junior secondary school that expanded to become the current St. Mary’s Yala. Approximately 2000 students attend the school each year and has a teaching staff of over 40. The school follows the Kenyan 8-4-4 education system.

== History ==
St. Mary's School Yala was a by-product of increased missionary activity by the Mill Hill Missionaries in Kenya in the early 1900s when Monsignor Brandsma (1874-1935) and a group of Mill Hill missionaries from the Netherlands whose vision to expand catholic education and counter Anglican and other Protestant missions already developed in Kenya. Brandsma succeeded in obtaining land from the then local Chief Odera Okang'o. Initially intended to be a teacher training institution, the school opened its doors to its first batch of students in 1927 and was upgraded to "A" level in 1957.

== Co-curriculum activities ==
The school offers various sporting disciplines, which include rugby, athletics, soccer, basketball, handball, indoor games, volleyball, badminton and field hockey. The rugby team won the national secondary school rugby championship in 2003 and came in Third Place in 2017 and was able to proceed to Uganda for the EA championship. The school is also a strong performer in drama and music with consistent top placement of its drama and music club compositions in festivals, students feted for the best stand-up comedy in the 2015 edition of the competition. The school also hosts the annual Yala 15s rugby tournament, a competition that attracts top rugby schools in western and Nyanza. St. Mary's Yala won in 2011, 2012, 2013, 2014, 2015, and 2017.

== Administrative structure ==
The following are the school's past principals;

Name	Start	End
Mr. Agoya	1970	1978
Mr. J.B. Juma	1978	1981
Mr. N. Arega	1981	1983
Mr. P. Odwuor	1983	1985
Mr. Joseph Owuor	1985	1987
Mr. John Were	1987	1996
Mr. Marcellous K'Ojwang'	1996	2005
Mr. John Awiti	2005	2016
Mr. Bonaventure O. Ollando	2016	2022

Deputy principals included Mr. M. Gweno 1991, Mr. Marcelus Kojwang 1995, Mr. Jephaniah Wabomba 1996, Mr. Bonaventure Ollando, 1999, Mrs. Rosemary Abuodha Omogo (Deputy Principal) 2006, Mr. Sammy Onyango took over as deputy Principal followed by Mr. Peter Auma 2010, Mr. Denis Oyako 2014, Mr. Nashon Sianga Adero, 2015, Mr. Nicholas Onyango 2017. Mr Awiti, the former chairman and later secretary-general of Kenya Secondary School Heads Association (KESSHA) retired in 2016 and was replaced by Mr. Bonaventure Ollando (Yala, 86) who is also an alumnus of the school.

== Facilities ==
The school undertook many new projects and renovations during Awiti’s reign. New pavements connecting classes, labs and dormitories were laid. Landscaping around the assembly area was done as well as the purchase of a new school bus, setting up departmental offices, the water project, a sick bay for the students and a laboratory named Yoba House, renovation of all the dormitories and renovation of staff houses. Current on-going projects include construction of a new dormitory with a capacity of 900 students. The school has been upgraded to six streams with over 880 students.

There are a total of 16 dormitories named after founders and prominent alumni of the school.

== Notable alumni ==
St. Mary's Yala boasts prominent alumni including

- Tom Mboya
- Mukhisa Khituyi
- Peter Oloo Aringo
- former Governor John Krop Lonyangapuo
