= Mount Mtelo =

Mountain in Kenya

Mtelo
- Location within Kenya

Highest point
- Elevation: 3,336 m (10,945 ft)
- Prominence: 1,768 m (5,801 ft)
- Listing: Ultra; Ribu
- Coordinates: 1°40′N 35°23′E

Geography
- Location: Kenya

Mount Mtelo (Sekerr) is the seventh-highest mountain in Kenya (3336m/10,944 ft), after Mount Kenya, Mount Elgon, Aberdares, High Cheranganis, and Mount Kipipiri, and is situated in the North West highlands of West Pokot County, approximately 120 km north of Kitale Town.

== Climbing the mountain ==
Marich Pass Field Studies Centre represents a good base to explore the mountain, and guides are available to help people with the ascent. It is a three-day hike to the top and back, and it is advised that hikers stay a night or two at the Mount Mtelo Viewpoint Camp, a campsite with cottage accommodation run by the Ywalasiwa family. However, access to the campsite by vehicle involves a steep drive up the Sekerr escarpment. No specialist equipment or training is required for the climb, and different trails can be taken to the campsite and peak, passing through cultivated areas of the Pokot, forest, bamboo, and open moorland, with extensive views of eastern Uganda and north-west Kenya on a clear day. The mountain is considered sacred, as it is described as the cradle of pastoral Pokot according to oral traditions. Mount Mtelo is home to black-and-white colobus monkeys, small antelope, three species of turaco and 10 sunbird species.

The altitude means the temperature and humidity are lower than in Marich, making hiking far more comfortable and unfavorable for mosquitoes.

== Community and development projects ==
The area is home to six clans, Chapin, Kamket, Ngusurot, Silokot, Talai, and Tungo, with an overall population of over 30,000. However, the area is isolated, and most people are involved in subsistence farming (maize and beans). In recent years local people, with outside assistance, have worked to set up several community projects aimed at helping the Pokot people of the Mbara sub-location. These projects have included: the creation of many water pipeline projects which provide safe drinking water to the local population, the building of a new clinic, and a tree nursery controlled by a local women's group.
