= Soapstone mining in Tabaka, Kenya =

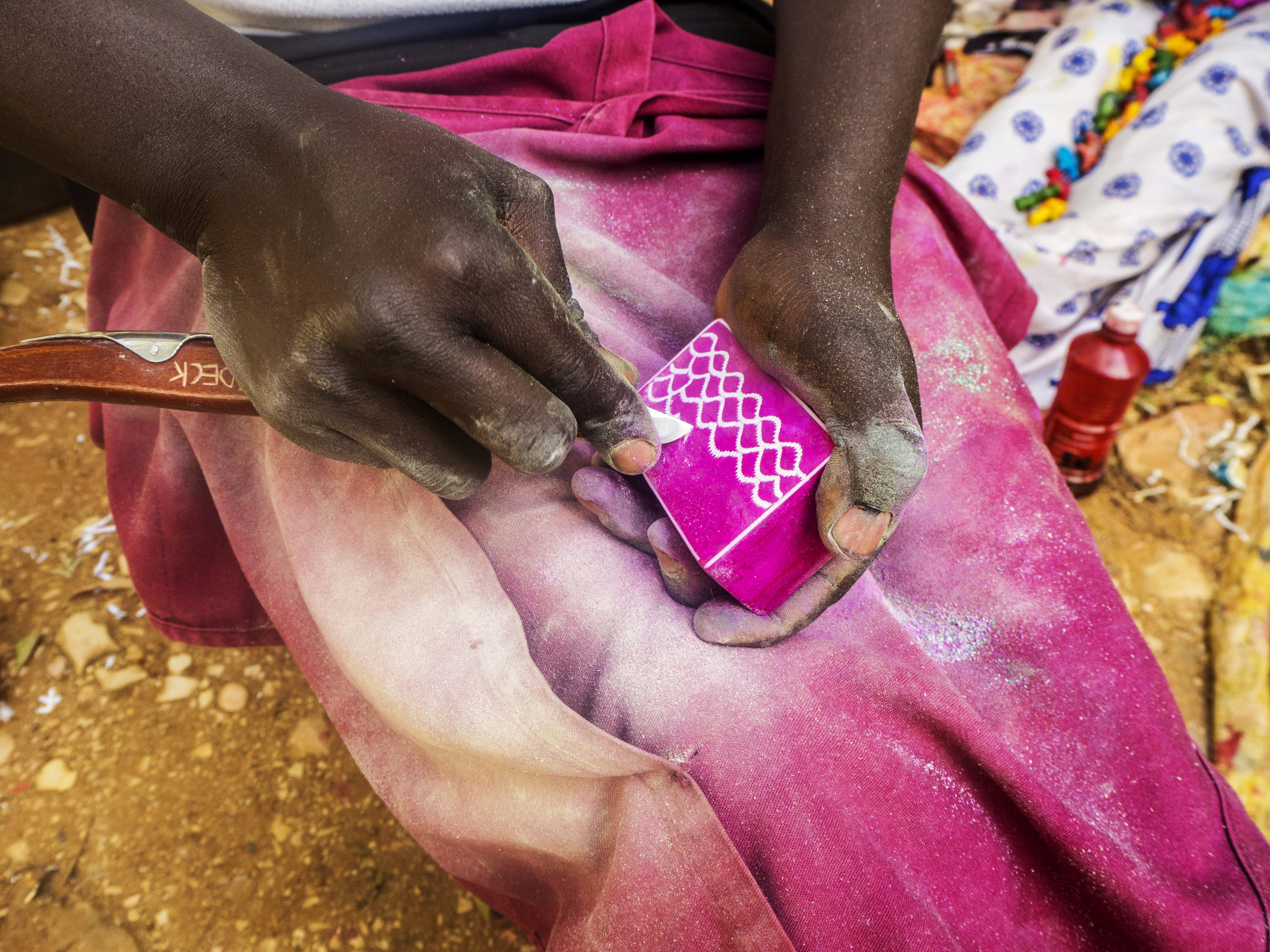
Soapstone carving in Tabaka

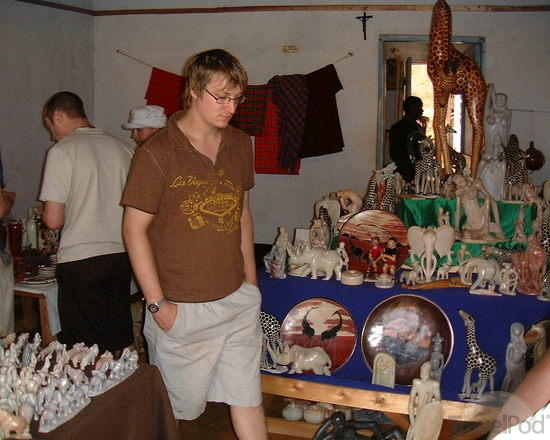
Soapstone carvings curio shop in Kisii, Kenya

In the Kisii region in Kenya, soapstone is mined in the town of Tabaka. It has been at the heart of industry and culture, with its malleability allowing for the carving of a variety of items ranging from common household items to ornaments and other décor items, all of which have found their way into the commercial space, birthing the aforementioned 'industry' around the mining and processing of the ore – largely centered in Tabaka. In its finely milled form, soapstone has been found to have various commercial uses outside carving.

The stone's colour ranges from a light pink to a creamy white or a grey hue. It is mined and carved by hand by artisans. The carved figurines and sculptures are then decorated by engraving artistic designs on their surfaces, polished, waxed and dyed or they are left in their natural texture and colour.

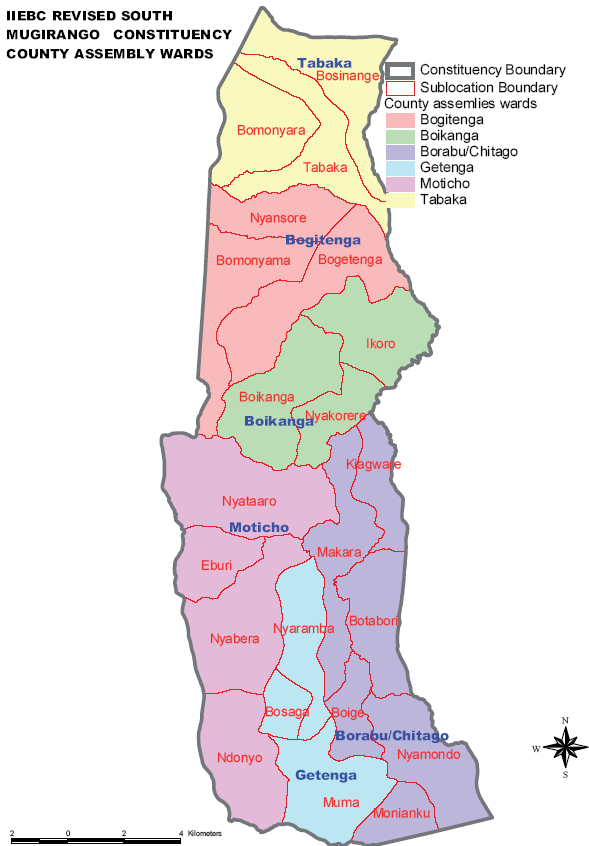
This area encompasses the epicenter of the Kisii soapstone industry with most of the deposits and processing taking place around Tabaka.

== Geographical occurrence ==
The Goti Chaki hills in Tabaka area -in South Mugirango constituency -are one of the first claimed locations for soapstone occurrence in Kisii. This location still has engravings from before the colonial era, including images of wild animals on soapstone outcrops. Other objects like as board games popularly known as "ajua" and other rudimentary items can also be seen on these hills' outcrops. Similar items and drawings have been discovered in other various Kisii regions where soapstone mineral deposit is found like in Manga Hills, Bosinange, Nyabigena and Sameta Hills.

== Formation ==
Kisii soapstone is a hydrothermal rock that is mostly composed of sericite and kaolinite. Its development is linked to hydrothermically changed lavas, which explains its classification as a Pulferay.

== Mining ==
=== Precolonial and colonial mining and use of soapstone ===
The development of Tabaka as the central point of soapstone mining and carving is the occurrence of relatively shallow and accessible quarries in the surrounding areas of Sameta, Nyabigege and Bomware. These were at the time open to all to access provided they had the labor resources to do so. This mostly meant the men did the mining as they were custodian to the community land- for Tabaka this meant ancestral lands in Riamosioma, Itumbe, Nyatike e.tc.

The mining itself was in its entirety founded in manual labor and the use of basic tools like pick-axes with communal labor being employed through cultural practices like the traditional ‘dance’ referred to as Risaga in the local dialect that was a communal call for help.

The process begun with the stripping of overlying layers of soil and other materials to expose the soapstone deposit. Then using iron tools –iron working was initially identified to the Bomware clan -the stone is removed from the ground and if need be, cut into more manageable sizes by hand held tools like machetes and axes.

The colonial era ushered in a new perspective to soapstone, I.e., commercialization. The kisii stone was no longer merely an item with household utility, the production had shifted from the household to the commercial space. Artifacts were now being used as currency to trade with their neighbors in markets like riosiri (bordering the Luo) and others.

=== Contemporary mining ===
The mining is manual and hands on with the same approach being employed to dig up, cut and transport the stones from mine to carve shop. No mechanization is employed to the process. The raw quarry stones are hand-excavated and transported to workshops. Picks and shovels are used to dig a large pit in the earth (50–75 feet in diameter) during the mining process. The fill and is stockpiled and reused to backfill the quarry holes after extracting the soapstone. Soapstone begins to re-form after 5–10 years, resulting in the availability of new soapstone.

== Cultural significance ==
Soapstone has historically been intertwined with the cultural and religious aspects of the Kisii with a particular inclination to the latter. Its religious significance was seen through its use in rites such as initiation. The rock paintings and engravings of Goti Chaki have for example been said to hold ritualistic meaning for the community.

Prior to its commercialization, the availability of soapstone combined with its malleability meant that its uses were diverse. At both household and community level it permeated almost all aspects of Gusii life. The stone could be carved to create household tools like bowls and plates and other vessels for storage. In its powdered form it has been reported in Kisii folklore to have been a part of Kisii sacred rites such as divination and healing as well. (Ong’esa 2010).

In the contemporary context, soapstone influenced culture is mainly commercial with those involved not using at household level but as a tradable product. Tabaka the epicenter of the soapstone industry can easily be described as a ‘mining town’ with a majority of her population being involved in one way or another in soapstone. (Esbin, 1998).

== Soapstone tourism ==
The soapstone handicraft industry in Tabaka has birthed a tourism culture in the area in regard to the stone and the processes around it.

‘Most of the handicraft activities have a long history, tradition and are of specific religious or ritualistic meaning. Local culture and handicraft products form part the principal assets of the community offering tourism products to attract visitors.

Handicraft and their production have been noted to attract tourist activities especially due to their ties to the cultures in those localities. The Kisii soapstone has birthed a niche of its own in the western Kenya tourism circuit.
