= Harambee =

Kenyan tradition of community self-help events

Coat of arms of Kenya

Harambee is a Kenyan tradition of community self-help events, e.g. fundraising or development activities. The word 'Harambee' means "all pull together" in Swahili, and is the official motto of Kenya, appearing on its coat of arms.

Harambee events may range from informal affairs lasting a few hours, in which invitations are spread by word of mouth, to formal, multi-day events advertised in newspapers. These events have long been important in parts of East Africa, as ways to build and maintain communities.

== History ==
Following Kenya's independence in 1963, the first Prime Minister, and later first President of Kenya, Jomo Kenyatta adopted "Harambee" as a concept of pulling the country together to build a new nation. He encouraged communities to work together to raise funds for all sorts of local projects, pledging that the government would provide their startup costs. Under this system, wealthy individuals wishing to get into politics could donate large amounts of money to local harambee drives, thereby gaining legitimacy; however, such practices were never institutionalised during Kenyatta's presidency.

== Etymology ==
The etymology of the term is unclear, but has been cited as genuinely Bantu. It is thought to have been first used by Swahili porters when lifting heavy loads and was originally spelt Halambee. However, according to a folk etymology, the word is said to have originated from Indian labourers responsible for building the Uganda Railway. According to this account, the labourers would invoke Hare, the divine energy of God, and Ambe, a Hindu goddess, during the construction.

== Criticism ==
=== Religious criticism ===
Kenyan Christians have criticised the use of the word harambee as an official term due to its alleged Hindu origin. This objection has been dismissed as being offensive to the country's Hindu community, and also on the basis that even if the supposed derivation from hare Ambeh (hail Ambeh) were true, it has become irrelevant to the term's modern usage and meaning.

=== Gender and feminist critiques ===
Women's groups have formed, post-Independence alternative institutions to harambee, where mutual-aid practices regularly relied heavily on the uncompensated labor of women to build community infrastructure. Under structural adjustment programs, state entities routinely deflected public funding gaps by offloading social service responsibilities onto grassroots female networks. While women contribute the vast majority of physical and financial labor at the grassroots level, male political elites frequently capture the structural authority and public credit during fundraising events to build personal political patronage. Consequently, many contemporary women's networks have shifted their focus away from broader, male-patronized harambee systems toward autonomous, decentralized chamas (micro-savings groups) to retain financial independence and bypass patriarchal structures.

=== Attempted replacement ===
In January 2002, the Risk Advisory Group Ltd commissioned by President Moi's administration as part of the anti-corruption efforts recommended the abolition of harambee, or the spirit of pulling together.

In 2003 when the National Rainbow Coalition NARC took over from the Kenya African National Union KANU, President Mwai Kibaki enacted the Public Officers Ethics Act which prohibited members of parliament and cabinet secretaries from presiding over harambee events.

In February 2018, a petition was presented to the Kenyan parliament and senate, seeking to have the word "harambee" removed from the coat of arms on the claim that it represents a Hindu goddess. The petition was rejected on the grounds that it would be discriminatory towards Hindus and the Hindi language, that the word Harambee is internationally recognised, and that the cost incurred in changing the coat of arms would be significant.

== See also ==
- Harambee Stars, the Kenya national football team
- Harambe
