= Kapenguria Museum =

Prison museum in Kapenguria, Kenya

Coordinates: 1.260912°N 35.07835°E

- Established: 1993
- Location: Kapenguria, Kenya

The Kapenguria Museum is a museum located in Kapenguria, Kenya. The museum is located inside the prison where prominent leaders of the Kenyan independence movement (the Kapenguria Six: Jomo Kenyatta, Kungu Karumba, Fred Kubai, Paul Ngei, Bildad Kaggia and Ramogi Achieng Oneko) were held and put on trial in 1952/3. The museum features galleries in the former cells of the prison, including displays on these leaders and the struggle against colonialism, and houses a memorial library in their honour.

The museum also features ethnographic galleries about the Pokot people.

It was opened as a museum in 1993.

== See also ==
- List of museums in Kenya
