= Kapenguria Constituency =

Electoral constituency in Kenya

Kapenguria Constituency is an electoral constituency in Kenya. It is one of four constituencies of West Pokot County. The constituency was established for the 1988 elections.

== Members of Parliament ==
| Elections | MP | Party | Notes |
|---|---|---|---|
| 1984 | William Sindano | KANU | One-party system. |
| 1988 | Francis Polisi Loile Lotodo | KANU | One-party system. |
| 1990 | E.L. Lotim | KANU | By-elections, One-party system. |
| 1992 | Francis Polisi Loile Lotodo | KANU | |
| 1997 | Francis Polisi Loile Lotodo | KANU | |
| 2001 | Samuel Chumel Moroto | KANU | By-elections |
| 2002 | Samuel Chumel Moroto | KANU | 9th Parliament of Kenya |
| 2007 | Julius Murgor | ODM | 10th Parliament of Kenya |
| 2013 | Samuel Chumel Moroto | KANU | 11th Parliament of Kenya |
| 2017 | Samuel Chumel Moroto | JP | 12th Parliament of Kenya |
| 2022 | Samuel Chumel Moroto | UDA | 13th Parliament of Kenya |

== Locations and wards ==
Locations
| Location | Population* |
| Chekomos | 2,385 |
| Chemwochoi | 3,887 |
| Chepkopegh | 12,146 |
| Endugh | 5,896 |
| Kaibos | 4,167 |
| Kaisagat | 8,119 |
| Kanyarkwat | 6,451 |
| Kapenguria | 14,607 |
| Kapkoris | 10,123 |
| Keringet | 3,045 |
| Kipkomo | 9,277 |
| Kishaunet | 13,661 |
| Miskwony | 5,825 |
| Mnangei | 15,379 |
| Nakwijit | 2,605 |
| Ptoyo | 6,153 |
| Riwo | 8,601 |
| Senetwo | 5,403 |
| Serewo | 3,992 |
| Sook | 2,944 |
| Talau | 4,964 |
| Tamugh | 4,839 |
| Ywalateke | 8,361 |
| Total | x |
1999 census.

Wards
| Ward | Registered Voters | Local Authority |
| Chekomos | 626 | Pokot County |
| Chemwochoi | 1,492 | Kapenguria municipality |
| Chepareria / Kosulol | 2,459 | Chepareria town |
| Chepkopegh | 3,101 | Pokot County |
| Endugh | 1,412 | Pokot County |
| Kaibos | 1,118 | Kapenguria municipality |
| Kanyarkwat | 2,203 | Pokot County |
| Kapchemogen | 1,301 | Chepareria town |
| Kapenguria | 4,056 | Kapenguria municipality |
| Kapenguria North | 2,298 | Pokot County |
| Keringet / Psigirio | 3,091 | Kapenguria municipality |
| Keringet | 2,012 | Pokot County |
| Kisiaunet | 4,280 | Kapenguria municipality |
| Miskwony | 1,634 | Pokot County |
| Nakwijit | 545 | Pokot County |
| Ptoyo | 1,511 | Pokot County |
| Riwo | 3,417 | Pokot County |
| Senetwo | 1,528 | Chepareria town |
| Siyoi | 2,336 | Kapenguria municipality |
| Sook | 832 | Pokot County |
| Talau | 1,413 | Kapenguria municipality |
| Tamugh | 1,305 | Pokot County |
| Ywalateke | 1,216 | Chepareria town |
| Total | 45,186 | |
*September 2005.
