= Mombasa tusks =

Aluminum monument in Mombasa, Kenya

- Mapembe ya Ndovu; Mapembeni; Pembe za Ndovu (Swahili)
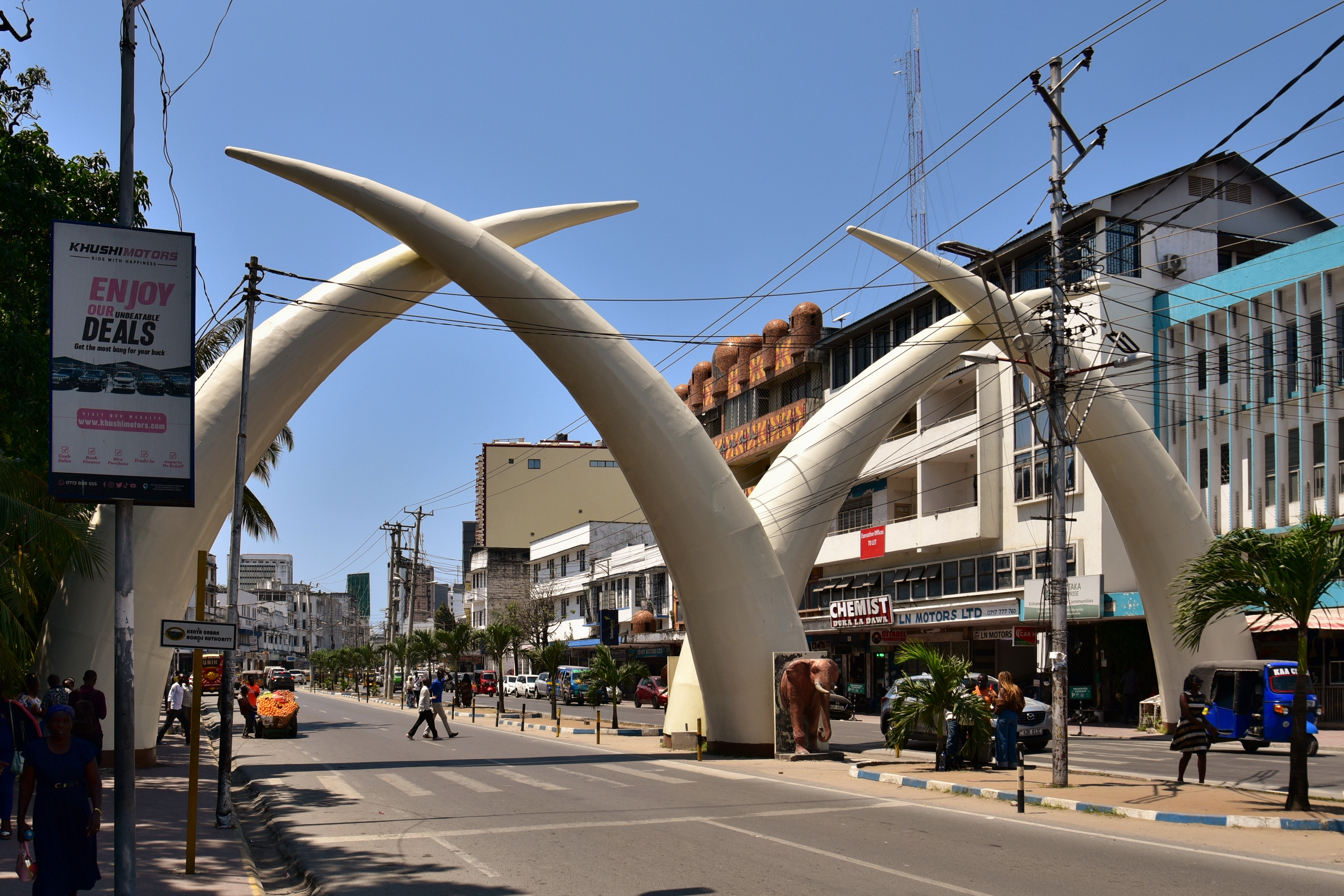
- The monument in 2025
- Interactive map of Mombasa tusks
- Location: Moi Avenue; Mombasa; Kenya
- Coordinates: 4°03′42″S 39°39′58″E
- Material: Aluminium
- Beginning date: 1952
- Completion date: 1956

The Mombasa Tusks, also referred to as Mapembe ya Ndovu or Mapembeni or Pembe za Ndovu (Swahili for elephant tusks), form a monument over Moi Avenue, a major thoroughfare in Mombasa, Kenya. Built in the 1950s to commemorate visits by the British royal family, the monument originally comprised two wooden structures resembling tusks; nowadays, there are four aluminium tusks in an M shape. The monument is under the jurisdiction of the National Museums of Kenya in addition to the city's municipal government.

== Origin ==
The Mombasa tusks were originally constructed in 1952 by the British administration of the Colony and Protectorate of Kenya, commemorating the visit of Queen Elizabeth II to the city. Made of wood and canvas, they were erected on the Kilindini Road, as Moi Avenue was then called, which led to the Queen's residence at the Mombasa Yachting Club (or simply Mombasa Club), situated next to Uhuru Garden. The monument quickly became a local attraction, with companies and local residents advertising and making announcements by the tusks.

Due to the impression the original canvas & wood tusks made, the municipal council wanted to make them a more permanent structure. There were originally just two tusks over Moi Avenue, which was then a one-lane road; however the road later expanded to two lanes and a new set of tusks were commissioned in 1956 by the municipal council. The new tusks were built totally by a well established local family company called Haji Suleman Haji Ladh & sons. Another reason for the refurbishment was the visit of Princess Margaret to the region in that year. A few metres away from the site of the original monument, the four new tusks (two over each lane) were made of weather-resistant aluminium & designed to last. The tusks coincidentally form the shape of the letter M, the first letter in Mombasa.

== Later history ==
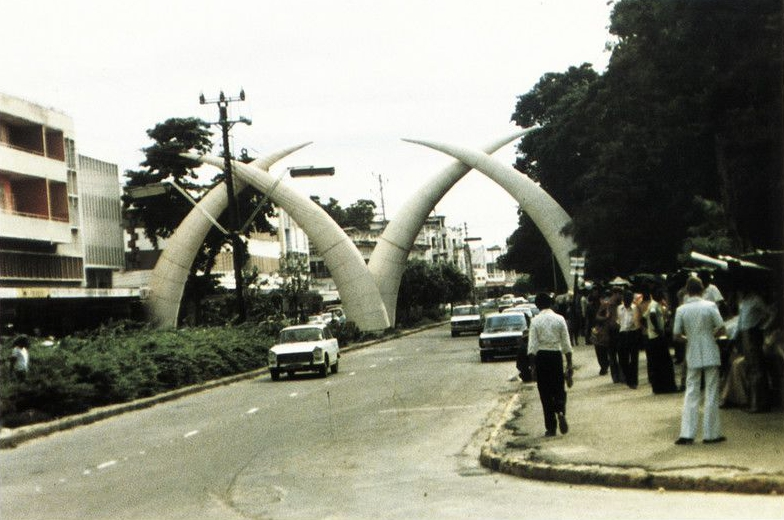
The monument in 1979

Since then, the white tusks have been repainted several times by United States Marines visiting the city. The municipal government placed restrictions on commercialisation and advertisement using the monument, and the National Museums of Kenya organization charges for the commercial filming of the monument. The tusks have become a popular tourist destination for the city in addition to a local meeting place.

On 3 October 2014, the monument was defaced with graffiti and red paint, reading "Mombasa Not 4 Ivory Export". According to John Mbaria of the Daily Nation, activists aimed to get the government to take action against poaching rings that commonly used the Port of Mombasa as an exit point. The move was denounced by Fatma Awale, Mombasa County Executive for Water and Environment, who stated that "[the county doesn't] condone the killing of elephants, but somebody should not take it upon themselves to deface county property while passing on a message". In 2017, the government of the county, in partnership with Mombasa Cement Ltd, once again refurbished the tusks. A model elephant was added to the centre of the tusks.
