= Chepareria =

- Location within Kenya
- Coordinates: 1.32°N 35.2°E
- Country: Kenya
- Province: Rift Valley Province

Population (2019)
  - Total: 6,565
- Time zone: UTC+3 (EAT)

Chepareria is a town located in West Pokot County, Rift Valley Province of Kenya. Under the Kenya's Independent Electoral and Boundaries Commission (IEBC), Chepareria town was named the administrative headquarters of Pokot South Constituency.
