= Mark Lomunokol =

Kenyan politician

Mark Lomunokol is a Kenyan politician who is currently a member of the National Assembly for Kacheliba Constituency. He is a member of the United Democratic Alliance .

He studied at Mount Kenya University, and prior to entering into parliament in the 2013 Kenyan general election, he worked for the World Food Programme and the Kenya Red Cross Society.

From 2013 to 2017 he was a member of the Committee on Regional Integration and the Departmental Committee on Transport, Public Works & Housing. Since 2017 he has been a member of the Special Funds Account Committee.

== Election results ==
General election 2017: Kacheliba
Party	Candidate	Votes	%
Party For Development And Reform	Mark Lomunokol	17,045	47.2
Jubilee	Lodinyo Lokitare John	15,317	42.4
KANU	Ibrahim Pkiyach Longolomoi	3,599	10.0
Maendeleo Chap Chap Party	Lokoilereng Alany Peter	175	0.5
Majority		1,728	4.8
