= Kapenguria =

Town in Kenya

Coordinates: 1°14′N 35°07′E

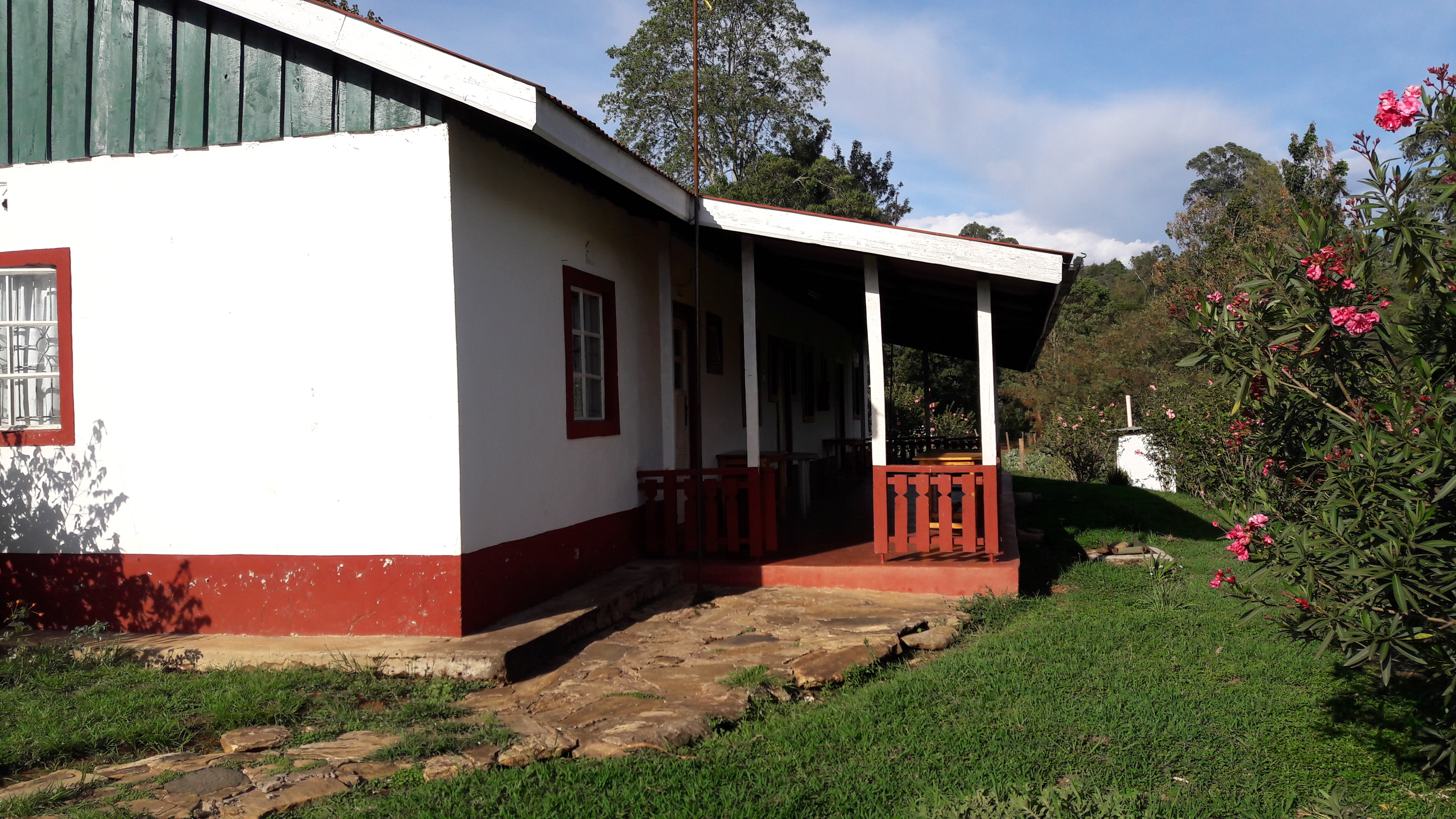
Kapenguria Bible Centre, a point of interest in Kapenguria.

Kapenguria is a town in Kenya and the capital of West Pokot County. It lies north-east of Kitale on the A1 road along the Kitale–Lodwar corridor in north-western Kenya. In the 2019 Kenya Population and Housing Census, Kapenguria urban centre had a population of 40,751. Kapenguria also serves as the administrative and commercial hub of the wider municipality established under the Urban Areas and Cities Act.

The town occupies an important place in Kenya's political history because it is associated with the detention and trial of the Kapenguria Six, among them Jomo Kenyatta, during the colonial period. It is also one of the principal service centres in the county, concentrating county government offices, commerce, education, and health services.

== Administration ==
Kapenguria is the county headquarters of West Pokot County and the seat of a number of devolved county institutions. The municipality board states that Kapenguria Municipality operates under the Urban Areas and Cities Act and the Kapenguria Municipal Charter. Recent municipal planning documents describe the municipality as comprising the wards of Kapenguria, Mnagei and Siyoi.

Kapenguria lies within Kapenguria Constituency, one of the four constituencies in West Pokot County. The constituency has six county assembly wards: Riwo, Kapenguria, Mnagei, Siyoi, Endugh and Sook.

== Economy ==
As the headquarters of West Pokot County, Kapenguria's economy is dominated by public administration, trade and services. County government offices, national government departments, banking, wholesale and retail trade, transport, hospitality and small businesses form a large share of employment in the town. The municipality's planning documents describe Kapenguria as the county's principal administrative and commercial hub.

The town hosts branches and outlets of major financial institutions and serves as a market centre for the surrounding agricultural and pastoral hinterland. Its location on the Kitale–Kapenguria–Lodwar highway also makes it an important stop on the northern transport corridor through western and north-western Kenya.

== Points of interest ==
=== Kapenguria Museum ===
Kapenguria is home to the Kapenguria Museum, a site managed by the National Museums of Kenya. The museum is located in the former prison complex where the Kapenguria Six were detained and tried during the colonial period. In addition to exhibits on the anti-colonial struggle, the museum also contains collections relating to the history and culture of local communities, including the Pokot.

=== Saiwa Swamp National Park ===
Saiwa Swamp National Park lies south of Kapenguria on the road toward Kitale and is one of the notable protected areas accessible from the town. The park is known for its wetland habitat and for species such as the sitatunga and De Brazza's monkey.

== Education ==
Kapenguria is a local education centre for West Pokot County. The University of Nairobi lists Kapenguria among its regional centres used for extra-mural and outreach teaching. The town also hosts a campus of the Kenya Medical Training College, which is listed in the institution's official campus directory.

Teacher training and technical education institutions in and around Kapenguria also contribute to the town's role as an educational hub within the county.

== Health ==
Kapenguria hosts the Kapenguria County Referral Hospital, the main referral health facility in West Pokot County. The hospital serves the county headquarters and a wider catchment area in the surrounding sub-counties. National and county health updates have also identified KMTC Kapenguria and the referral hospital as part of the town's growing health and medical training infrastructure.

== Notable people ==
Kapenguria is associated with the long-distance runner Tegla Loroupe, whose peace initiatives have been closely linked with the town and the wider West Pokot region. The annual Tegla Loroupe Peace Race is held in Kapenguria and was established to promote reconciliation among communities in the region. The town is also home to the Tegla Loroupe Peace Academy, an education initiative connected to the foundation's peace and development work.

== See also ==
- Kapenguria Six
- Kapenguria Museum
