= Coat of arms of Kenya =

Versions
- Escutcheon-only version
- Armiger: Kenya
- Adopted: 1963
- Shield: Per fess sable and vert, on a fess gules fimbriated argent a cock grasping in the dexter claw an axe also argent.
- Supporters: On either side a lion or, grasping in the interior forepaw a spear of estate, the hafts of the spears crossed in saltire behind the shield.
- Compartment: The whole upon a compartment representing Mount Kenya proper.
- Motto: Harambee (Let's pull together in Swahili)

The coat of arms of Kenya features two lions, a symbol of protection, holding spears and a traditional East African shield. The shield and spears symbolize unity and defence of freedom. The shield contains the national colours, representing:

- Black for the people of Kenya.
- Red for the blood shed during the struggle for freedom.
- Green for the agriculture and natural resources.
- White for unity and peace.

On the shield is a rooster holding an axe while moving forward, portraying authority, the will to work, success, and the break of a new dawn. It is also the symbol of Kenya African National Union (KANU) party that led the country to independence.

The shield and lions stand on a silhouette of Mount Kenya containing in the foreground examples of Kenya agricultural produce - coffee, pyrethrum, sisal, tea, maize and pineapples.

The coat of arms is supported by a scroll upon which is written the word 'Harambee'. In Swahili, Harambee means "pulling together" or "all for one".

== Description ==
Kenya national law lays forth a heraldic blazon, or official description of the coat of arms:

The escutcheon of the coat of arms of Kenya

Arms.— Per fess sable and vert, on a fess gules fimbriated argent a cock grasping in the dexter claw an axe also argent.

Supporters.— On either side a lion or, grasping in the interior forepaw a spear of estate, the hafts of the spears crossed in saltire behind the shield.

The whole upon a compartment representing Mount Kenya proper.

Motto.— Harambee.

== Historical coat of arms ==
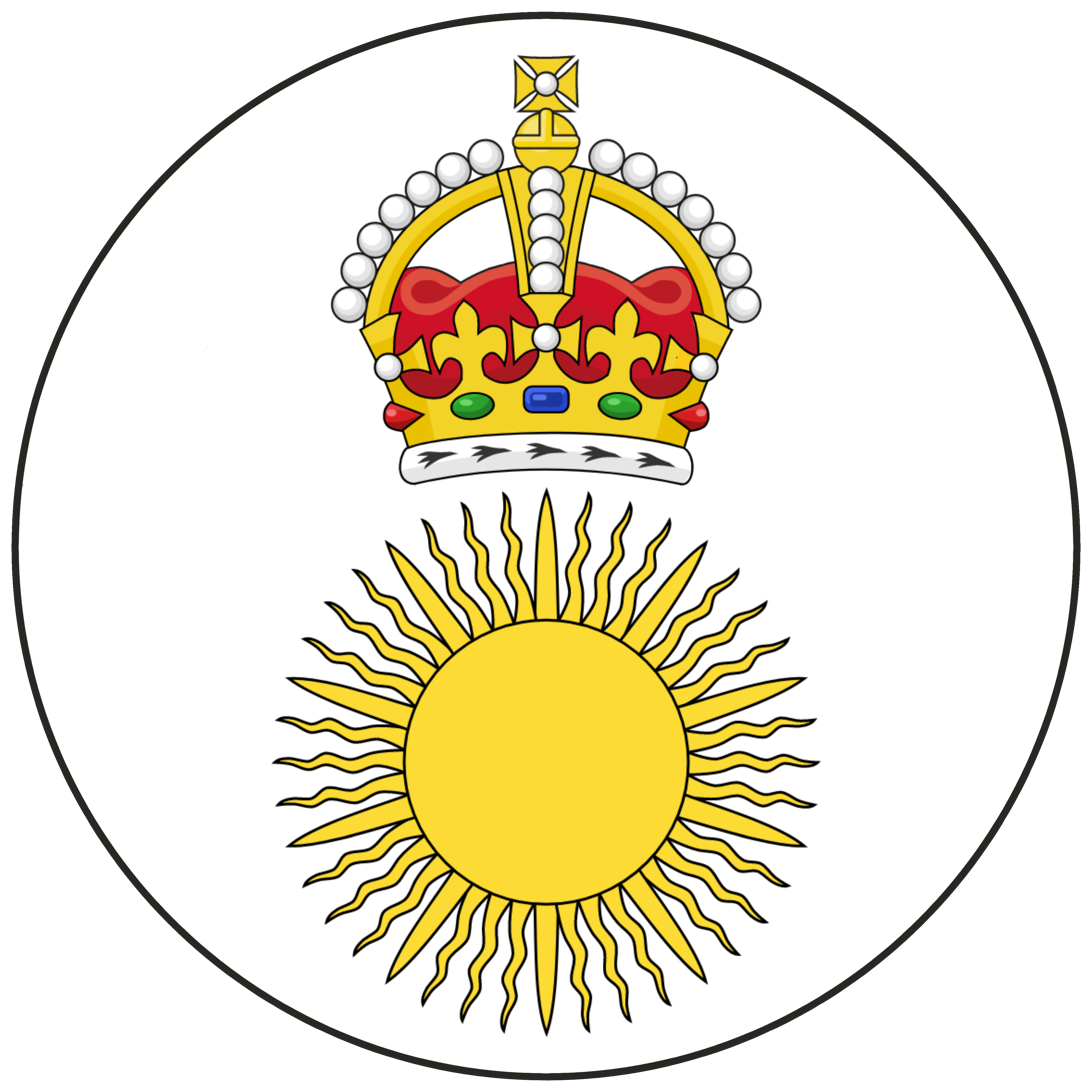
Badge of the British East African Company (1888-1895)

East African Protectorate (1895-1920)

Colony of Kenya (1920-1963)

== See also ==
- Coat of arms of Kenyan Counties
- College of Arms of Kenya
