= Sigor Constituency =

Kenyan electoral constituency

Sigor Constituency is an electoral constituency in Kenya. It is one of four constituencies of West Pokot County. The constituency had 14 wards until 2010 when they were merged to form 4 wards while others formed the now Pokot south constituency., all electing Members of County Assembly for the West Pokot County Government. The constituency was established for the 1988 elections.

== Members of Parliament ==
Elections	MP	Party	Notes
1988	Christopher M. Lomada	KANU	One-party system.
1992	Philip Ruto Rotino	KANU	
1997	Christopher M. Lomada	KANU	
2002	Philip Ruto Rotino	KANU	
2007	Wilson Litole	ODM	
2013	Philip Ruto Rotino	URP	
2017	Peter Lochakapong'	JP	

== Wards ==
Wards
Ward	Registered Voters
Batei	4,107
Cheptulel	2,334
Kaptabuk	3,216
Lelan	4,327
Lomut	3,365
Masol	1,273
Mwino	2,195
Parua	2,484
Porkoyu	826
Sekerot	947
Sekerr	3,063
Sondany	2,053
Tapach	3,024
Wei Wei	4,336
Total	37,550
*September 2005.
