= Moi Avenue (Mombasa) =

Prominent street in Mombasa, Kenya

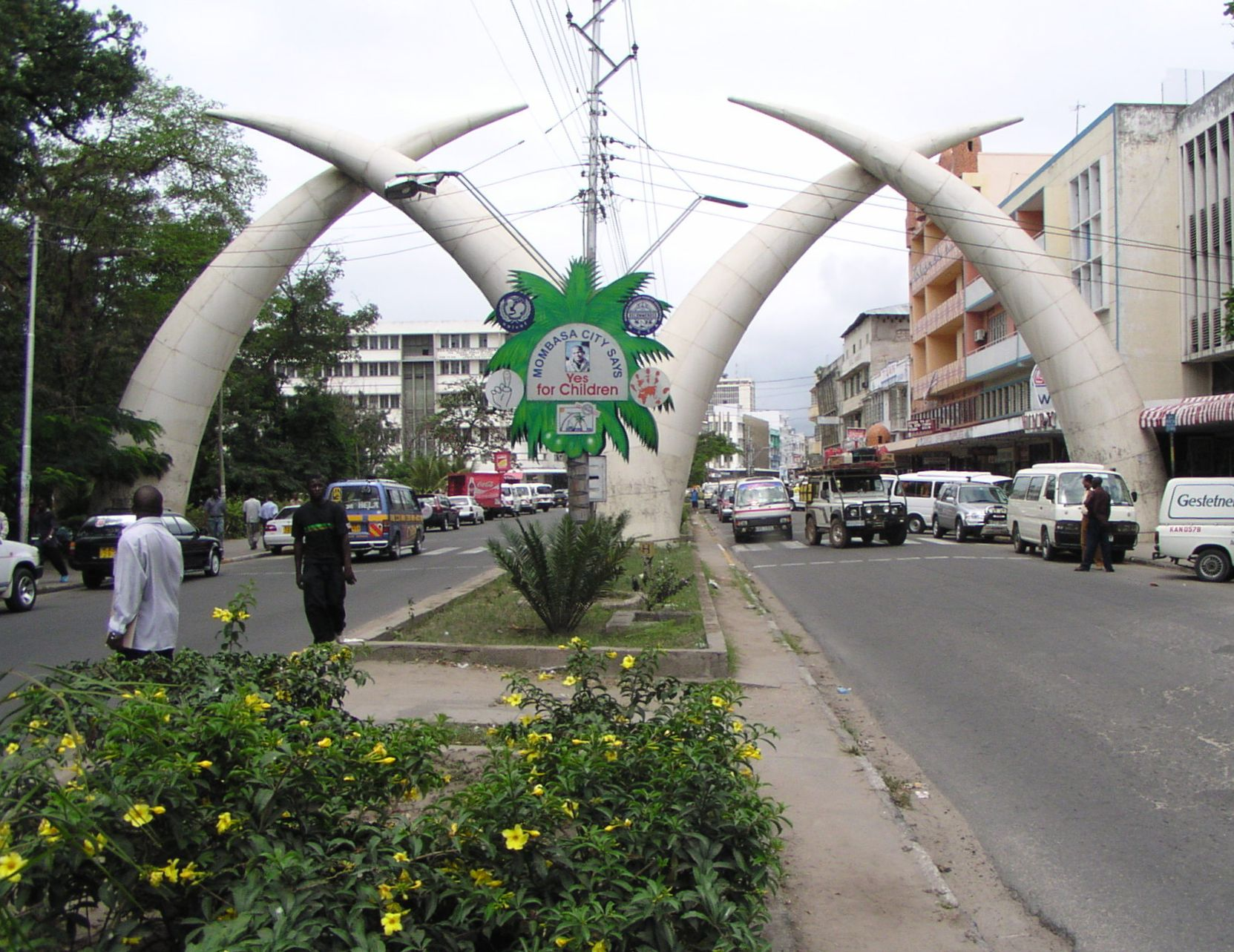
- The Mombasa tusks in 2005
- Interactive map of Moi Avenue
- Former name: Kilindini Road
- Namesake: Daniel arap Moi
- Type: Thoroughfare
- Length: 1.05 mi (1.69 km)
- Location: Mombasa, Kenya
- Coordinates: 4°03′42″S 39°40′05″E
- Western end: Kilindini
- Eastern end: Digo Road

Moi Avenue is a primary thoroughfare in Mombasa, Kenya. The road runs from west to east from Kilindini to a roundabout with Digo Road. Originally called the Kilindini Road, its name was later changed in recognition of Kenya's second president, Daniel arap Moi. The road consists of two two-lane carriageways, and like Jomo Kenyatta Avenue, a central median of approximately 3 feet (1 m) in width, along which flowers and shrubs are often planted.

Moi Avenue is known for the Mombasa tusks, two pairs of giant aluminium elephant tusks crossing the dual carriageway. The tusks were commissioned in commemoration of a visit to Mombasa by Queen Elizabeth in 1952 and have remained since that time. Initially the lower part of the tusks were illegally used for advertisement, but after the city council enforced strict laws the landmark has remained in its original form ever since.
