= West Pokot County =

- County
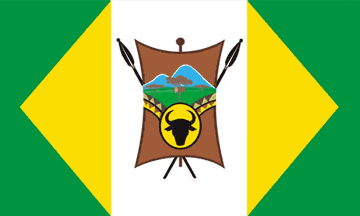
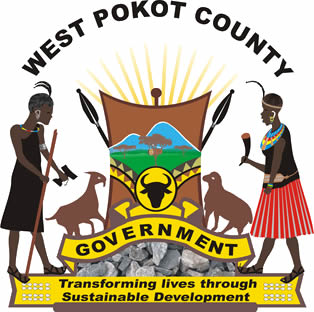
- Flag Coat of arms

- Location in Kenya
- Coordinates: 01.23333°N 035.1167°E
- Country: Kenya
- Formed: 4 March 2013
- Capital: Kapenguria

Government
  - Governor: Simon Kachapin

Area
  - Total: 9,169.4 km^{2} (3,540.3 sq mi)

Population (2019)
  - Total: 621,241
  - Density: 67.752/km^{2} (175.48/sq mi)
- Time zone: UTC+3 (EAT)
- Website: westpokot.go.ke

West Pokot County is a county in Kenya. Its capital and largest town is Kapenguria, its area is approximately 9,169.4 square kilometres and it measures 132 kilometres from north to south. West Pokot County is bordered to the north by Turkana County, to the east by Baringo County, to the south-east by Elgeyo-Marakwet County, to the south by Trans Nzoia County and to the west by Uganda. According to the 2019 census, the county had a population of 621,241.

The county corresponds to one of the 47 county governments provided for under the Constitution of Kenya. It is predominantly rural and is widely associated with pastoralism, agro-pastoral production and cross-border trade with Uganda. The county is home to Tegla Loroupe, one of Kenya's most prominent female long-distance runners, and is the birthplace of Israeli Olympic marathon runner Lonah Chemtai Salpeter.

== History ==
=== Pre-colonial period ===
The area of present-day West Pokot has historically been inhabited mainly by the Pokot people, a Nilotic-speaking community whose economy developed around a mixture of pastoralism and cultivation. Livestock, especially cattle, sheep and goats, played a central role in social organisation, exchange and prestige, while farming and trade became increasingly important over time.

=== Colonial period ===
Under British colonial rule, the area formed part of the north-western Rift Valley frontier and was administered through a system of provincial and district administration. Colonial boundary-making and administrative controls affected patterns of mobility, grazing and security in the wider Pokot region.

=== Post-independence and devolution ===
After Kenya attained independence in 1963, the area continued as part of the former West Pokot District within Rift Valley Province. Under the 2010 Constitution, Kenya adopted a devolved system of government, and West Pokot became one of the country's county governments, with the new county structure taking effect after the 2013 general election. The county's first integrated development planning framework under devolution was set out in the First County Integrated Development Plan, 2013–2017.

== Demographics ==
Pokot people are the main inhabitants of the county, and there is also a minority community of Sengwer.

Historical population
Year	Pop.	±%
1979	158,652	—
1989	225,449	+42.1%
1999	308,086	+36.7%
2009	512,690	+66.4%
2019	621,241	+21.2%

=== Religion ===
Religion in West Pokot County

Religion (2019 Census)	Number
Catholicism	192,787
Protestant	232,950
Evangelical Churches	81,184
African instituted Churches	43,831
Orthodox	2,477
Other Christian	14,202
Islam	2,619
Hindu	26
Traditionists	19,645
Other	9,723
No Religion	18,104
Don't Know	1,213
Not Stated	106

== Geography ==
West Pokot County lies within the north-western part of Kenya's former Rift Valley region and includes escarpments, highland zones and lower semi-arid plains. The county's physical landscape contributes to marked differences in climate, settlement and land use between the highlands and lowlands. Mount Mtelo is located in West Pokot County.

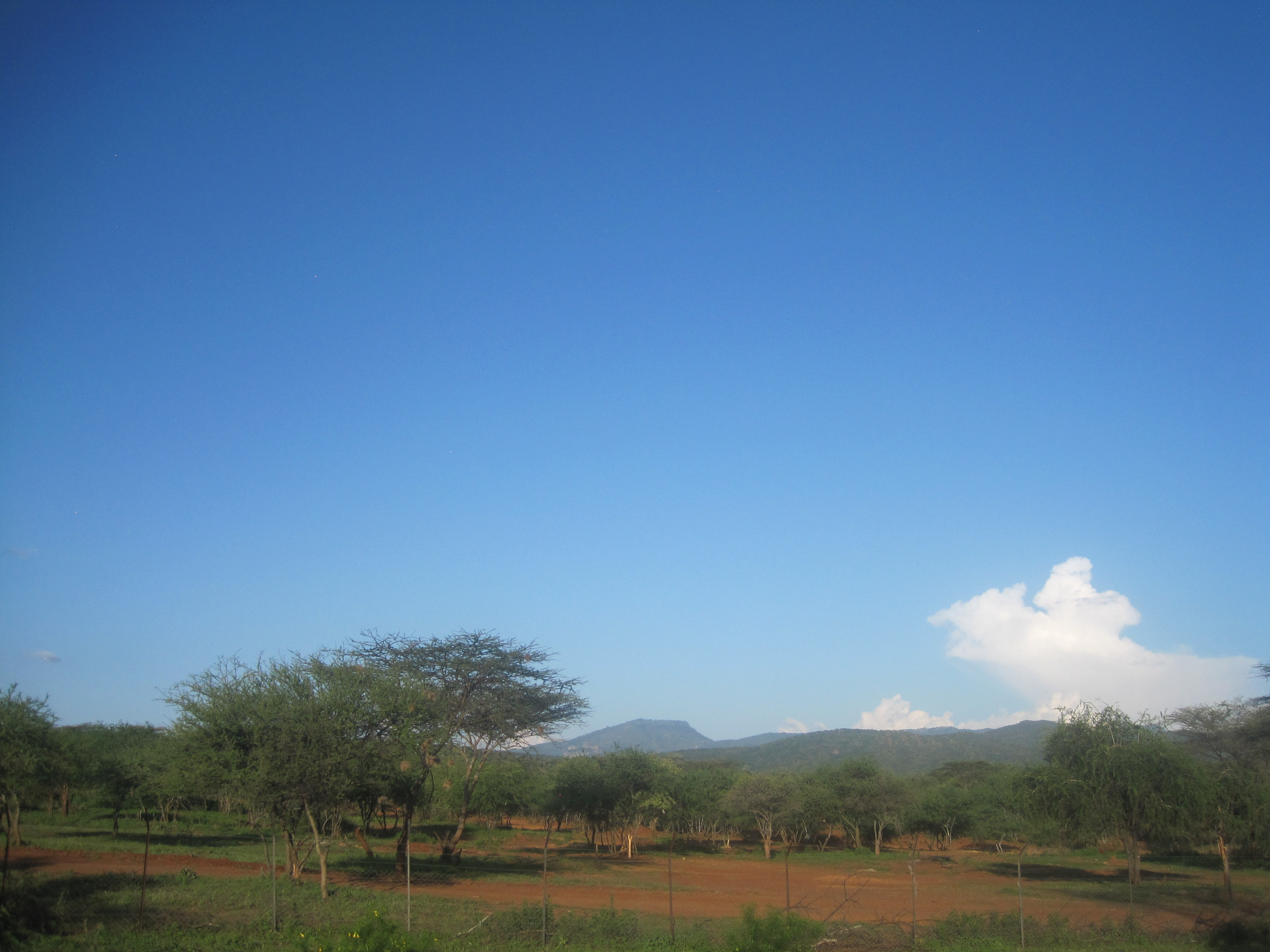
Picture in Kiwawa

=== Climate and environment ===
The county experiences considerable climatic variation. According to the West Pokot climate risk profile, rainfall is irregular and increasingly unpredictable, and both droughts and floods have had major effects on livelihoods and food security. The county climate change action plan identifies recurrent drought, land degradation, flood risk and pressure on water resources as major environmental challenges affecting agriculture, livestock production, infrastructure and public health. In 2013, heavy rains and flooding displaced large numbers of residents and damaged cropland, while later years were marked by severe drought and hunger stress in parts of the county.

== Constituencies ==
1. Kapenguria Constituency
2. Kacheliba Constituency
3. Pokot South Constituency
4. Sigor Constituency

== County subdivisions ==
The county government is administratively organised into sub-counties and wards under the devolved system of government.

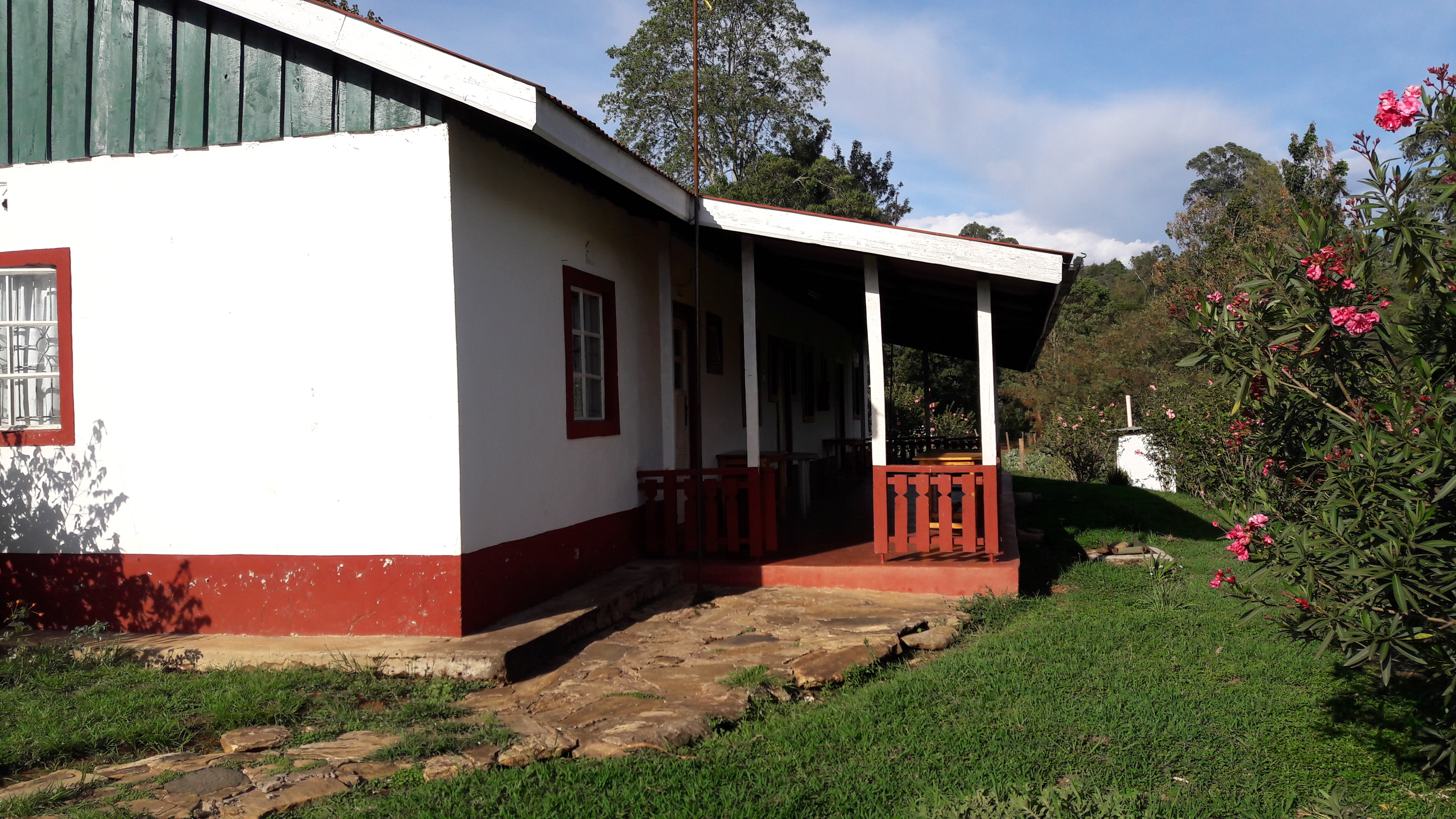
Kapenguria Bible Centre in Kapenguria Town.

Local authorities (councils)
Authority	Type	Population*	Urban pop.*
Kapenguria	Municipality	56,019	12,984
Chepareria	Town	8,212	901
Pokot	County	243,855	0
Total	-	308,086	13,885
* 1999 census.

Administrative divisions
Division	Population*	Urban pop.*	Headquarters
Alale	29,679	0	
Chepareria	68,518	900	Chepareria
Chesegon	21,343	0	
Kacheliba	20,151	0	
Kapenguria	62,746	12,438	Kapenguria
Kasei	9,879	0	
Kongelai	20,018	0	Kongelai
Lelan	32,931	0	
Sigor	42,821	0	Sigor
Total	308,086	13,338	-
* 1999 census.

== Government ==
Under the Constitution of Kenya, county governments exercise devolved functions in areas such as county planning, local health services, agriculture, county transport, trade development and local tourism. West Pokot County is headed by an elected governor and county assembly, while Kapenguria serves as the main administrative centre. The official county website lists four sub-counties: West Pokot, Pokot North, Pokot South and Pokot Central.

== Economy ==
The West Pokot county economy is principally driven by livestock rearing and agriculture. The county climate risk profile describes farming as economically central to local livelihoods, while also noting the heavy dependence of many households on climate-sensitive production systems.

=== Agriculture ===
Large numbers of cattle, sheep and goats are reared, with some of the breeds reared being Sahiwal Zebus, Galla goats and Merino sheep. In Pokot Central and North sub-counties, zebu indicine cattle have long been kept for meat production while in West Pokot and Pokot South sub-counties dairy breeds, primarily Ayrshire and Friesian, are increasingly kept for milk production.

Some of the main crops grown include maize, a staple crop grown mainly in West Pokot Sub-County, as well as finger millet, coffee, beans, onions, sweet potatoes, green grams, peas, mangoes, oranges, bananas, potatoes and pyrethrum. Irrigation infrastructure has been developed by the National Irrigation Authority and the Kerio Valley Development Authority in Sigor across the permanent rivers Weiwei and Muruny, putting over 1,000 acres into year-round crop production without relying entirely on rainfall.

=== Livestock ===
Livestock rearing remains central to both the county economy and Pokot social life. The sector, however, faces recurring challenges from drought, animal disease and insecurity, including livestock theft and cattle rustling. In early 2022, the West Pokot government, in partnership with the European Union, established the Nasukuta Export Abattoir in Chepareria ward. The abattoir started at 60% capacity utilisation for cattle, sheep and goats, and was projected to slaughter 18,720 cattle and 56,160 sheep and goats in its first year.

=== Mining ===
Mineral extraction has become a more visible part of the county economy in the 21st century. A clinker plant was constructed by Simba Cement in Sebit to crush limestone from Sebit Hills of West Pokot County and began operating in July 2023. The plant has the capacity to process an estimated 6,000 tonnes of clinker daily, or about two million tonnes annually, after which the material is transported to a grinding plant in Eldoret.

== Infrastructure ==
=== Transport ===
Transport infrastructure has historically been a major development challenge in the county. The county's first integrated development plan stated that 87% of the road network consisted of earth and gravel surfaces, and described the general condition of the network as poor. Poor roads and rugged terrain have long affected access to markets, public services and tourist sites.

=== Energy ===
The Turkwel Hydro Power Plant operated by electricity generating company Kengen is situated in West Pokot County. Though the plant produces about 105 MW of power which is fed to the national grid, many communities around the power plant and the extensive districts of West Pokot and Turkana do not fully benefit from this resource. The county integrated development plan also identified low electricity coverage as one of the key infrastructure constraints affecting development.

=== Water and irrigation ===
Water availability is a major economic and social issue in many parts of the county, particularly in the drier lowlands. Permanent rivers such as Weiwei and Muruny support irrigation and reduce dependence on rain-fed farming in some areas.

== Education ==
Education indicators in West Pokot have historically lagged behind national averages in a number of areas. The county integrated development plan reported a gross primary school enrolment of 88%, a teacher-pupil ratio of 1:52, and a county literacy level of 40%. The same plan attributed low literacy to nomadic lifestyles, inaccessibility, inadequate educational facilities and some harmful cultural practices. Expanding school infrastructure and improving retention remain recurring policy goals in county planning documents.

== Health ==
Healthcare services in the county are delivered through hospitals, health centres and dispensaries, but access remains uneven, especially in remote areas. The county integrated development plan reported that residents in some parts of West Pokot had to travel long distances to reach the nearest health facility, with an average distance of about 25 kilometres in the early devolution period. County planning documents have identified maternal mortality, under-five mortality, immunisation coverage, malaria burden and staffing levels as major health concerns requiring continued investment.

== Culture ==
The culture of West Pokot County is strongly shaped by Pokot traditions, including pastoral livelihoods, livestock-centred social values, age-based organisation and community ceremonies. County development documents have also identified cultural heritage and Pokot cultural products as assets with tourism and economic potential.

== Security ==
Parts of West Pokot have periodically experienced insecurity linked to cattle rustling, boundary disputes and competition over pasture and water resources. The county integrated development plan proposed peace committees, community policing and livestock branding among the measures intended to reduce conflict and cattle theft.

== Tourism ==
Tourism remains a relatively underdeveloped sector, but county documents and official county material identify significant potential in landscape, culture and heritage. Attractions associated with the county include Mount Mtelo, the Cherangani Hills, Kapenguria Museum, and cultural tourism linked to Pokot traditions. The county government has described West Pokot as a destination of natural beauty and cultural heritage, while its development plans have proposed a county tourist circuit and improvements to hospitality infrastructure.

== Notable residents ==
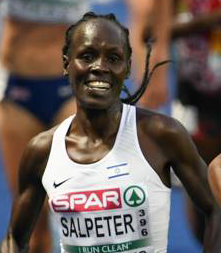
Lonah Chemtai Salpeter

- Tegla Loroupe, world record holder for 20, 25, and 30 kilometres running
- Simon Kachapin, 1st and 3rd Governor of West Pokot County
- Lonah Chemtai Salpeter (born 1988), Kenyan-born Israeli Olympic marathon runner

== 2019 landslide ==
On 23 November 2019 there was a landslide around 2:30 a.m. in West Pokot County on the hills of Nyerkulian,Chesegon and Muino that was triggered by heavy rainfall and killed more than 50 people. At least 22 other people were reported missing and more than 22,000 were displaced. Flooded roads and bridges were swept away after the incident, hindering rescue operations, and the event became one of the deadliest natural disasters recorded in the county.
