= Mrima =

Traditional name for the part of the East African coast facing Zanzibar

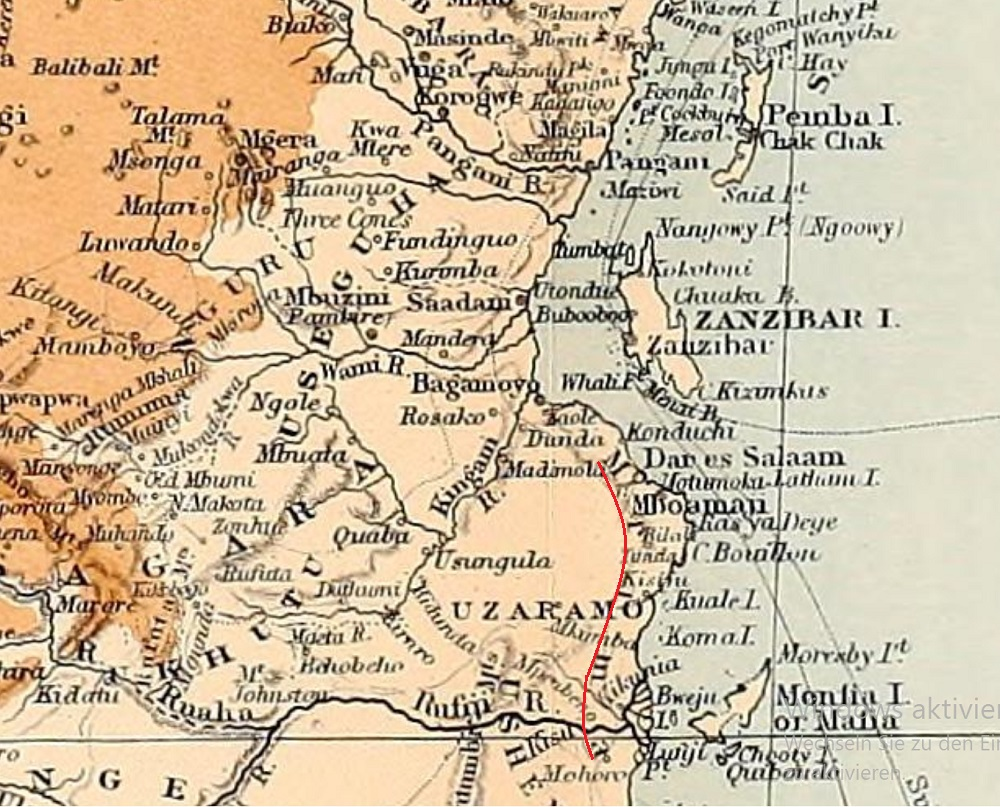
The name "Mrima" (red underlined) on an American map of 1890 showing East Africa (between Dar es Salaam and Rufiji River; it designates only the southern part of the area

Mrima or Mrima Coast is the traditional name for the part of the East African coast facing Zanzibar. The inhabitants were often called "Wamrima" or Mrima people even though they could belong to different tribes and language groups.

The sources give different definitions about the borders of the coastal stretch. Generally the Mrima consisted only of a coastal strip of a width of two days travel, i.e. about 20 miles or 30 km.

Ludwig Krapf, who collected his information at Mombasa between 1844 and 1852, wrote that the Wamrima began on the northern side with the Vumba people, the speakers of the Kivumba dialect of Swahili, who lived in the area of Shimoni, opposite Wasini Island, continued southwards until the Usambara Hills and "the land of Mrima".

A.C. Madan who collected his material at Zanzibar around 1890, described Mrima being the area between Wasini and Kipumbwi at the mouth of the Msangasi River, about 25 km south of the Tanzanian town of Pangani. Madan thought the name Mrima could derive from a variation of the Swahili word"mlima" for hill, mountain, thus denoting the hilly country rising behind the immediate coast.

Later authors described a wider use of the name on the southern side. Stigand for example described the Kimrima dialect reaching from Vanga (southern Kenya) until the neighborhood of Kilwa.

In southern Kenya there is a village and a small mountain called Mrima about 20 km north of Vanga, Kwale County.

Fungu Mrima (also Fungu Marima) is a coral reef in the Mafia Channel between the mainland and Mafia Island.
