= Friedrich Ahlfeld =

German-Bolivian geologist (1892–1982)

- Born: Friedrich Adolf Ahlfeld; October 6, 1892; Marburg, German Empire
- Died: January 9, 1982 (aged 89); Cochabamba, Bolivia
- Known for: Ahlfeldite; Federico Ahlfeld Waterfall; First ascents of Guallatiri and Cerro Bonete

Academic background
- Education: Clausthal Mining Academy (PhD)
- Thesis: Die Mineralien der Provinz Hessen-Nassau (1921)

Academic work
- Discipline: Geology, mineralogy
- Sub-discipline: Economic geology, ore deposits

Friedrich Adolf Ahlfeld (/ˈɑːlfɛlt/; AHL-felt; October 6, 1892 – January 9, 1982), also known as Federico Ahlfeld, was a German and Bolivian geologist and mining engineer. He spent most of his career in Bolivia, where he compiled the first geological and mineral-deposit maps of the country and published extensively on its geology and mineral deposits, leading him to be widely regarded as the "father of Bolivian geology". He is also credited with the first documented ascent of the volcanoes Guallatiri in 1926 and Cerro Bonete in 1945.

== Early life and education ==
Ahlfeld was born in 1892 in Marburg, then in the Province of Hesse-Nassau of the Kingdom of Prussia, part of the German Empire. His father Johann Friedrich Ahlfeld was a gynecologist, and his mother, Elisabeth Vollmer, was a daughter of Adolph Friedrich Vollmer, a marine painter from Hamburg.

He began studying mining at the Clausthal Mining Academy in 1910. His studies were interrupted by the outbreak of World War I, in which he served. He completed his undergraduate degree in 1919 and began specializing in economic geology and mineral deposits. In 1921, he received his doctorate from Clausthal with a thesis on minerals in Hesse-Nassau, the second doctorate on a mineralogical subject awarded by the academy. Over the next two years, he worked as a consultant, traveling to Italy, Austria, Yugoslavia, and Romania.

== Career ==
=== Arrival in Bolivia ===
Traveling by way of Venezuela, Ahlfeld first arrived in Bolivia in 1924, at the age of 32, having been hired as a geologist by the mining firm Mauricio Hochschild & Compañía in La Paz. His first assignment was a study of the old silver mines of Carangas in the Western Cordillera. During this period, he also worked in Peru, publishing a study of the antimony deposits of Acora, near Puno, in 1926. From 1927 to 1928, he took part in a German expedition to the Cordillera Real of Bolivia led by the geographer Carl Troll. He traveled to Africa in 1929, visiting Southern Rhodesia, the Congo, and Tanzania and attended the International Geological Congress in Pretoria.

=== Marburg and international work ===
Between 1929 and 1932, Ahlfeld returned to Marburg to study mineralogy, and in 1931 he was appointed dozent of mineralogy, petrography, and economic geology at the University of Marburg, a post he held until 1934. He signed the vow of allegiance of the Professors of the German Universities and High-Schools to Adolf Hitler and the National Socialistic State in November 1933, and he was recorded as a member of the Sturmabteilung (SA) from October 1933 to September 1934. Throughout this time, he continued to travel to South America, examining the silver mines of Colquijirca near Cerro de Pasco and climbing the volcano Misti near Arequipa in Peru. He also served in 1932–1933 as an adviser to the Soviet government at Tashkent, publishing on the mineralogy and mineral deposits of Turkmenistan and Kazakhstan.

=== Later career and return to Bolivia ===
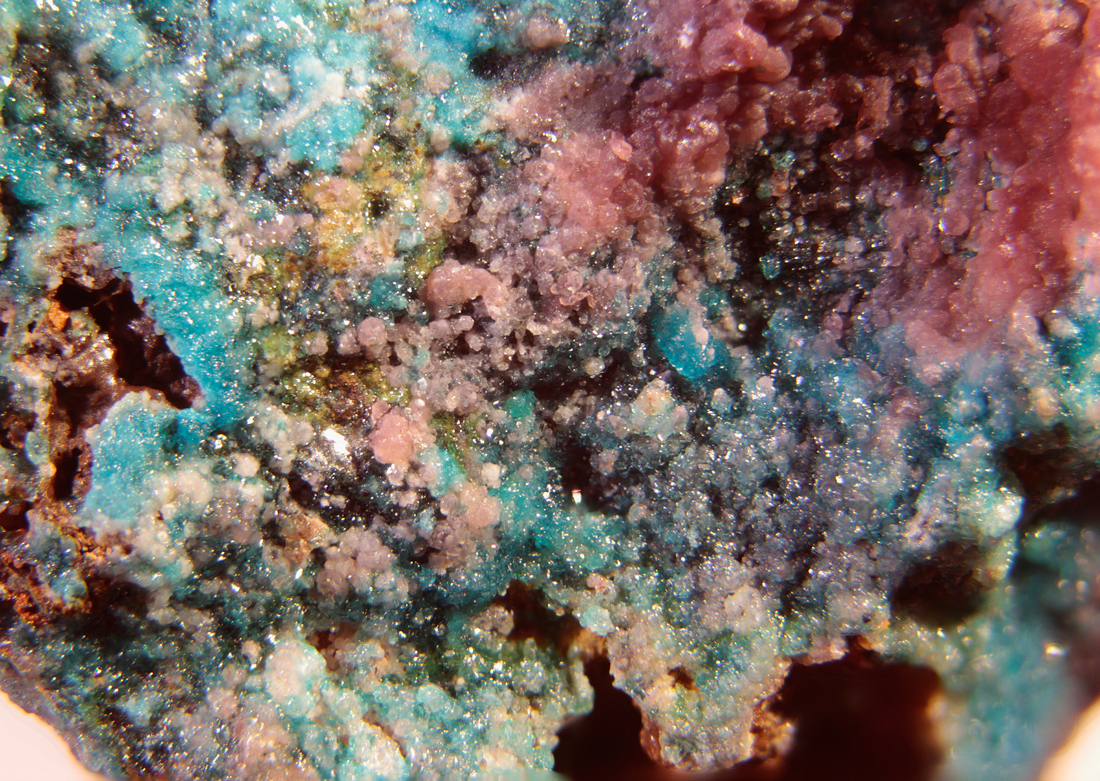
The mineral alfeldite

Ahlfeld returned to Bolivia as chief geologist to the Bolivian government in La Paz from 1935 to 1936. The following year, he took a position as a geologist for the Chinese government at Nanking, supervising exploration for tin deposits in Hunan. In 1938, he was appointed chief geologist in charge of the geology section of the new Directorate General of Mines and Petroleum, the precursor to the Geological Survey of Bolivia. He also held a professorship at the mining academy of Jujuy in Argentina until 1948. He published a paper on the occurrence of bismutotantalite powder from El Quemado in northwestern Argentina with Victorio Angelelli (1908–1991) in 1948.

Following the nationalization of the Bolivian mining industry, Ahlfeld worked from 1953 to 1954 as a consultant to the José Lippeheide mining company in the Basque region of Spain, where in 1954 he published his monograph on the mineral deposits of Bolivia as well as a paper on the tungsten deposits of Spain.He returned to Bolivia the next year as a consulting geologist to several organizations, including the United Nations (1956–1960) and the German Geological Mission in Bolivia (1959–1963). He was professor of geology and mineralogy at the University of San Andrés in La Paz from 1956 to 1960, honorary professor at the Tomás Frías University in Potosí and at the Bolivian Technological Institute in La Paz (1963), and served as chief of the Bolivian Geological Survey (GEOBOL). He made his final visit to Germany in 1960 and traveled to Switzerland in 1961.

== Mountaineering ==
Ahlfeld made the first documented ascent of Guallatiri, a 6,060-to-6,071-metre (19,882 to 19,918 ft) stratovolcano in the Western Cordillera, in 1926. The peak lies entirely on the Chilean side of the Bolivia–Chile border; before Ahlfeld's ascent it had commonly been thought to straddle the frontier.

He was an energetic mountaineer throughout his fieldwork and is reported to have climbed numerous other peaks in the Western Cordillera, chiefly in 1945, including first ascents of Cerro Bonete and Moruco in November of that year. According to the mountaineering historian Jill Neate, over the course of his explorations, Ahlfeld covered more than 100,000 kilometres (62,000 mi) on foot.

== Legacy ==
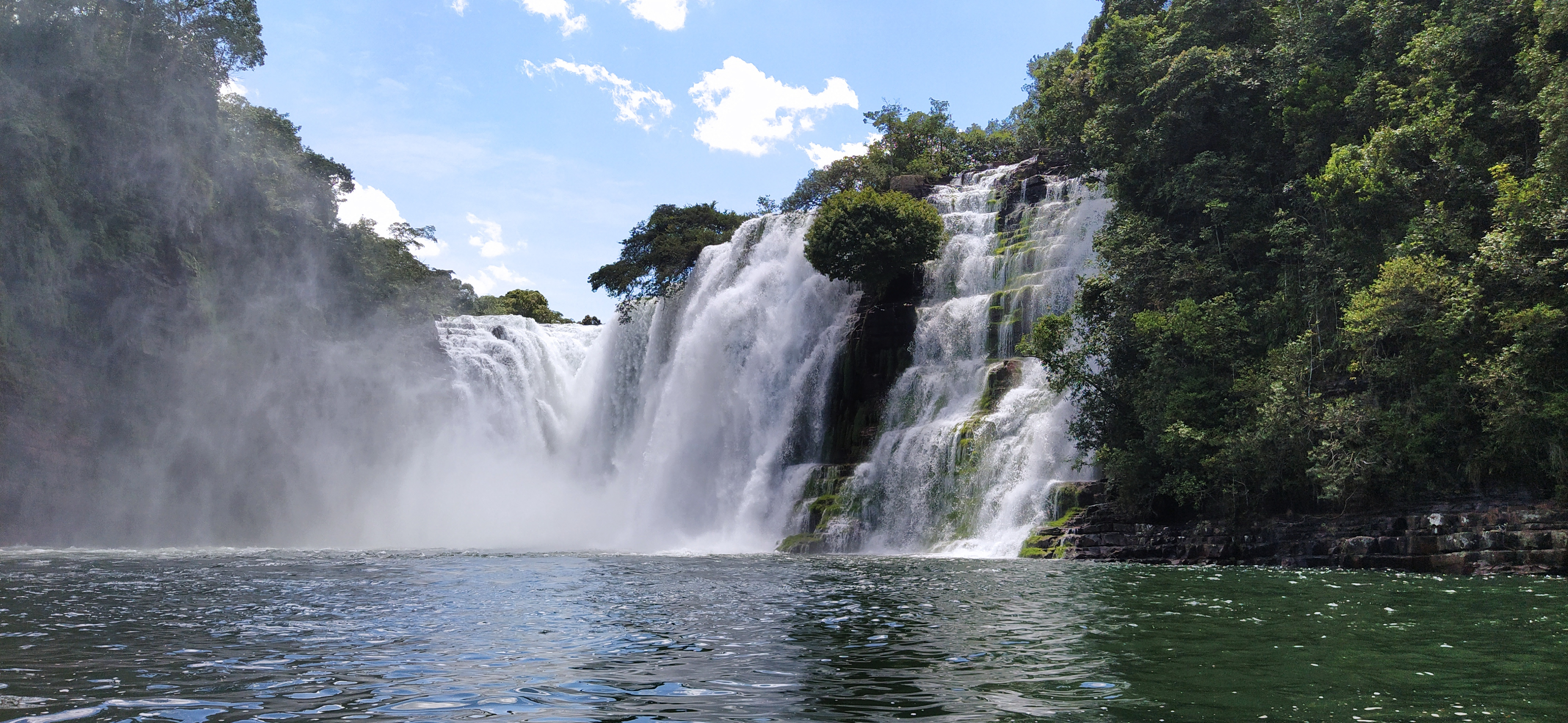
Federico Ahlfeld Waterfall in Noel Kempff Mercado National Park

Ahlfeld was a prolific author, publishing 142 works on Bolivia between 1925 and 1975, including writings on geography, mountaineering, archaeology, and ethnography, together with some 36 publications on other countries and 8 on general mineralogy, for a total of about 186 works. Most appeared in German and Spanish, which is one reason he remained comparatively little known among English-speaking geologists.

A specialist in ore deposits, ore genesis, and metallogenic belts, Ahlfeld was considered a leading authority on tin and tungsten. He studied many of Bolivia's most important mines, among them Uncía-Llallagua, Pulacayo, the Cerro Rico of Potosí, and Colquechaca, and compiled the first geological and mineral-deposit maps of Bolivia. He described the mineral ramdohrite in 1929–1930 and, with Paul Ramdohr and Berndt, angelellite in 1959, and carried out early work on the temperature-dependent crystallization of cassiterite. His regional surveys also provided a basis for petroleum exploration, contributing to the discovery of new oil fields near Santa Cruz de la Sierra in 1950.

The nickel selenite mineral ahlfeldite, from the Pacajake (Virgen de Surumi) deposit in Potosí Department, was named in his honor by the chemist Robert Herzenberg. The Frederico Ahlfeld Falls, a waterfall on the Paucerna River in Noel Kempff Mercado National Park in eastern Bolivia, also bears his name. His extensive collections of Bolivian minerals were widely dispersed among museums and private collectors.

Ahlfeld died in Cochabamba, where he had long lived, on January 9, 1982, at the age of 89.

== Selected publications ==
- Geología de Bolivia (1946; 2nd ed., with L. Branisa, 1964)
- Las especies minerales de la República Argentina (with V. Angelelli, 1948)
- Los yacimientos minerales de Bolivia (1954)
- Las especies minerales de Bolivia (with M. Reyes, 1955)
- Zinn und Wolfram (1958)
- Los yacimientos minerales y de hidrocarburos de Bolivia (with A. Schneider-Scherbina, 1964)
- Geografía física de Bolivia (1968)
