= East African Trade Union Congress =

EATUC
- East Africa Trade Union Congress
- Founded: 1949
- Location: Kenya
- Key people: Makhan Singh; Fred Kubai

The East Africa Trade Union Congress was an umbrella union, founded by Fred Kubai and Makhan Singh, in 1949 as a means to mobilise workers across races to advance their interests in the then British Colonies of Kenya, Uganda and Tanganyika. The work of the union was, however, heavily curtailed by repressive tactics of the British colonial government. Secretary-general Makhan Singh was arrested in 1951, and jailed for 10 years. while chairman Fred Kubai was among the Kapenguria Six, arrested and charged with organising the Mau Mau rebellion.
