= Machine learning in earth sciences =

Applications of machine learning (ML) in earth sciences include geological mapping, gas leakage detection and geological feature identification. Machine learning is a subdiscipline of artificial intelligence aimed at developing programs that are able to classify, cluster, identify, and analyze vast and complex data sets without the need for explicit programming to do so. Earth science is the study of the origin, evolution, and future of Earth. The planet's system can be subdivided into four major components including the solid earth, atmosphere, hydrosphere, and biosphere.

A variety of algorithms may be applied depending on the nature of the task. Some algorithms may perform significantly better than others for particular objectives. For example, convolutional neural networks (CNNs) are good at interpreting images, whilst more general neural networks may be used for soil classification, but can be more computationally expensive to train than alternatives such as support vector machines. The range of tasks to which ML (including deep learning) is applied has been ever-growing in recent decades, as has the development of other technologies such as unmanned aerial vehicles (UAVs), ultra-high resolution remote sensing technology, and high-performance computing. This has led to the availability of large high-quality datasets and more advanced algorithms.

== Significance ==
=== Complexity of earth science ===
Problems in earth science are often complex. It is difficult to apply well-known and described mathematical models to the natural environment, therefore machine learning is commonly a better alternative for such non-linear problems. Ecological data are commonly non-linear and consist of higher-order interactions, and together with missing data, traditional statistics may underperform as unrealistic assumptions such as linearity are applied to the model. A number of researchers found that machine learning outperforms traditional statistical models in earth science, such as in characterizing forest canopy structure, predicting climate-induced range shifts, and delineating geologic facies. Characterizing forest canopy structure enables scientists to study vegetation response to climate change. Predicting climate-induced range shifts enable policy makers to adopt suitable conversation method to overcome the consequences of climate change. Delineating geologic facies helps geologists to understand the geology of an area, which is essential for the development and management of an area.

=== Inaccessible data ===
In earth sciences, some data are often difficult to access or collect, therefore inferring data from data that are easily available by machine learning method is desirable. For example, geological mapping in tropical rainforests is challenging because the thick vegetation cover and rock outcrops are poorly exposed. Applying remote sensing with machine learning approaches provides an alternative way for rapid mapping without the need of manually mapping in the unreachable areas.

=== Reduce time costs ===
Machine learning can also reduce the efforts done by experts, as manual tasks of classification and annotation etc. are the bottlenecks in the workflow of the research of earth science. Geological mapping, especially in a vast, remote area is labour, cost and time-intensive with traditional methods. Incorporation of remote sensing and machine learning approaches can provide an alternative solution to eliminate some field mapping needs.

=== Consistent and bias-free ===
Consistency and bias-free is also an advantage of machine learning compared to manual works by humans. In research comparing the performance of human and machine learning in the identification of dinoflagellates, machine learning is found to be not as prone to systematic bias as humans. A recency effect that is present in humans is that the classification often biases towards the most recently recalled classes. In a labelling task of the research, if one kind of dinoflagellates occurs rarely in the samples, then expert ecologists commonly will not classify it correctly. The systematic bias strongly deteriorate the classification accuracies of humans.

== Optimal machine learning algorithm ==
The extensive usage of machine learning in various fields has led to a wide range of algorithms of learning methods being applied. Choosing the optimal algorithm for a specific purpose can lead to a significant boost in accuracy: for example, the lithological mapping of gold-bearing granite-greenstone rocks in Hutti, India with AVIRIS-NG hyperspectral data, shows more than 10% difference in overall accuracy between using support vector machines (SVMs) and random forest.

Some algorithms can also reveal hidden important information: white box models are transparent models, the outputs of which can be easily explained, while black box models are the opposite. For example, although an SVM yielded the best result in landslide susceptibility assessment accuracy, the result cannot be rewritten in the form of expert rules that explain how and why an area was classified as that specific class. In contrast, decision trees are transparent and easily understood, and the user can observe and fix the bias if any is present in such models.

If computational resource is a concern, more computationally demanding learning methods such as deep neural networks are less preferred, despite the fact that they may outperform other algorithms, such as in soil classification.

== Usage ==
=== Mapping ===
==== Geological or lithological mapping and mineral prospectivity mapping ====
Geological or lithological mapping produces maps showing geological features and geological units. Mineral prospectivity mapping utilizes a variety of datasets such as geological maps and aeromagnetic imagery to produce maps that are specialized for mineral exploration. Geological, lithological, and mineral prospectivity mapping can be carried out by processing data with ML techniques, with the input of spectral imagery obtained from remote sensing and geophysical data. Spectral imaging is also used – the imaging of wavelength bands in the electromagnetic spectrum, while conventional imaging captures three wavelength bands (red, green, blue) in the electromagnetic spectrum.

Random forests and SVMs are some algorithms commonly used with remotely-sensed geophysical data, while simple linear iterative clustering convolutional neural network (SLIC-CNN) and convolutional neural networks (CNNs) are commonly applied to aerial imagery. Large scale mapping can be carried out with geophysical data from airborne and satellite remote sensing geophysical data, and smaller-scale mapping can be carried out with images from unmanned aerial vehicles (UAVs) for higher resolution.

Vegetation cover is one of the major obstacles for geological mapping with remote sensing, as reported in various research, both in large-scale and small-scale mapping. Vegetation affects the quality of spectral images, or obscures the rock information in aerial images.

Example applications in geological, lithological, and mineral prospectivity mapping
Objective	Input dataset	Location	Machine learning algorithms (MLAs)	Performance
Lithological mapping of gold-bearing granite-greenstone rocks	AVIRIS-NG hyperspectral data	Hutti, India	Linear discriminant analysis (LDA), random forest, support vector machine (SVM)	SVM outperforms the other MLAs.
Lithological mapping in the tropical rainforest	Magnetic vector inversion, ternary RGB map, Shuttle Radar Topography Mission (SRTM), false color (RGB) of Landsat 8 combining bands 4, 3 and 2	Cinzento Lineament, Brazil	Random forest	Two predictive maps were generated: (1) Map generated with remote sensing data only has a 52.7% accuracy when compared to the geological map, but several new possible lithological units are identified (2) Map generated with remote sensing data and spatial constraints has a 78.7% accuracy but no new possible lithological units are identified
Geological mapping for mineral exploration	Airborne polarimetric terrain observation with progressive scans SAR (TopSAR), geophysical data	Western Tasmania	Random forest	Low reliability of TopSAR for geological mapping, but accurate with geophysical data.
Geological and mineralogical mapping	Multispectral and hyperspectral satellite data	Central Jebilet, Morocco	Support vector machine (SVM)	The accuracy of using hyperspectral data for classifying is slightly higher than that using multispectral data, obtaining 93.05% and 89.24% respectively, showing that machine learning is a reliable tool for mineral exploration.
Integrating multigeophysical data into a cluster map	Airborne magnetic, frequency electromagnetic, radiometric measurements, ground gravity measurements	Trøndelag, Mid-Norway	Random forest	The cluster map produced has a satisfactory relationship with the existing geological map but with minor misfits.
High-resolution geological mapping with unmanned aerial vehicle (UAV)	Ultra-resolution RGB images	Taili waterfront, Liaoning Province, China	Simple linear iterative clustering-convolutional neural network (SLIC-CNN)	The result is satisfactory in mapping major geological units but showed poor performance in mapping pegmatites, fine-grained rocks and dykes. UAVs were unable to collect rock information where the rocks were not exposed.
Surficial geology mapping remote predictive mapping (RPM)	Aerial photos, Landsat reflectance, high-resolution digital elevation data	South Rae Geological Region, Northwest Territories, Canada	Convolutional neural networks (CNN), random forest	The resulting accuracy of CNN was 76% in the locally trained area, while 68% for an independent test area. The CNN achieved a slightly higher accuracy of 4% than the random forest.

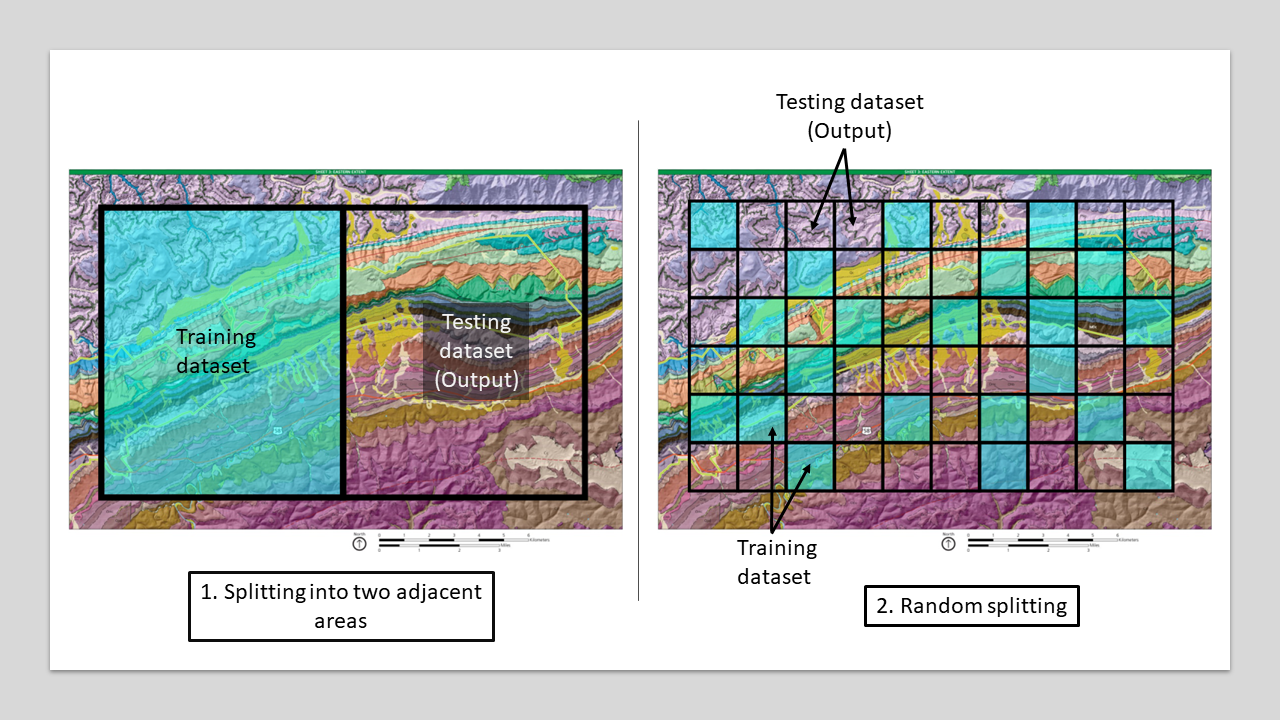
Methods of splitting of the datasets into training dataset and testing dataset As the training of machine learning for landslide susceptibility mapping requires both training and testing datasets, splitting the dataset is required. Two splitting methods for the datasets are presented on the geological map of the east Cumberland Gap. The method presented on the left, 'Splitting into two adjacent areas', is more useful as the automation algorithm can carry out mapping of a new area with the input of expert processed data of adjacent land. The cyan pixels show the training dataset while the remaining show the testing.

==== Landslide susceptibility and hazard mapping ====
Landslide susceptibility refers to the probability of landslide of a certain geographical location, which is dependent on local terrain conditions. Landslide susceptibility mapping can highlight areas prone to landslide risks, which is useful for urban planning and disaster management. Such datasets for ML algorithms usually include topographic information, lithological information, satellite images, etc., and some may include land use, land cover, drainage information, and vegetation cover according to the study requirements. As usual, for training an ML model for landslide susceptibility mapping, training and testing datasets are required. There are two methods of allocating datasets for training and testing: one is to randomly split the study area for the datasets; another is to split the whole study into two adjacent parts for the two datasets. To test classification models, the common practice is to split the study area randomly; however, it is more useful if the study area can be split into two adjacent parts so that an automation algorithm can carry out mapping of a new area with the input of expert-processed data of adjacent land.

Example applications in landslide susceptibility and hazard mapping
Objective	Input dataset	Location	Machine learning algorithms (MLAs)	Performance
Landslide susceptibility assessment	Digital elevation model (DEM), geological map, 30m Landsat imagery	Fruška Gora Mountain, Serbia	Support vector machine (SVM), decision trees, logistic regression	Support vector machine (SVM) outperforms others
Landslide susceptibility mapping	ASTER satellite-based geomorphic data, geological maps	Honshu Island, Japan	Artificial neural network (ANN)	Accuracy greater than 90% for determining the probability of landslide.
Landslide susceptibility zonation through ratings	Spatial data layers with slope, aspect, relative relief, lithology, structural features, land use, land cover, drainage density	Parts of Chamoli and Rudraprayag districts of the State of Uttarakhand, India	Artificial neural network (ANN)	The AUC of this approach reaches 0.88. This approach generated an accurate assessment of landslide risks.
Regional landslide hazard analysis	Topographic slope, aspect, and curvature; distance from drainage, lithology, distance from lineament, land cover from TM satellite images, vegetation index (NDVI), precipitation data	Eastern Selangor state, Malaysia	Artificial neural network (ANN)	The approach achieved 82.92% accuracy of prediction.

=== Feature identification and detection ===
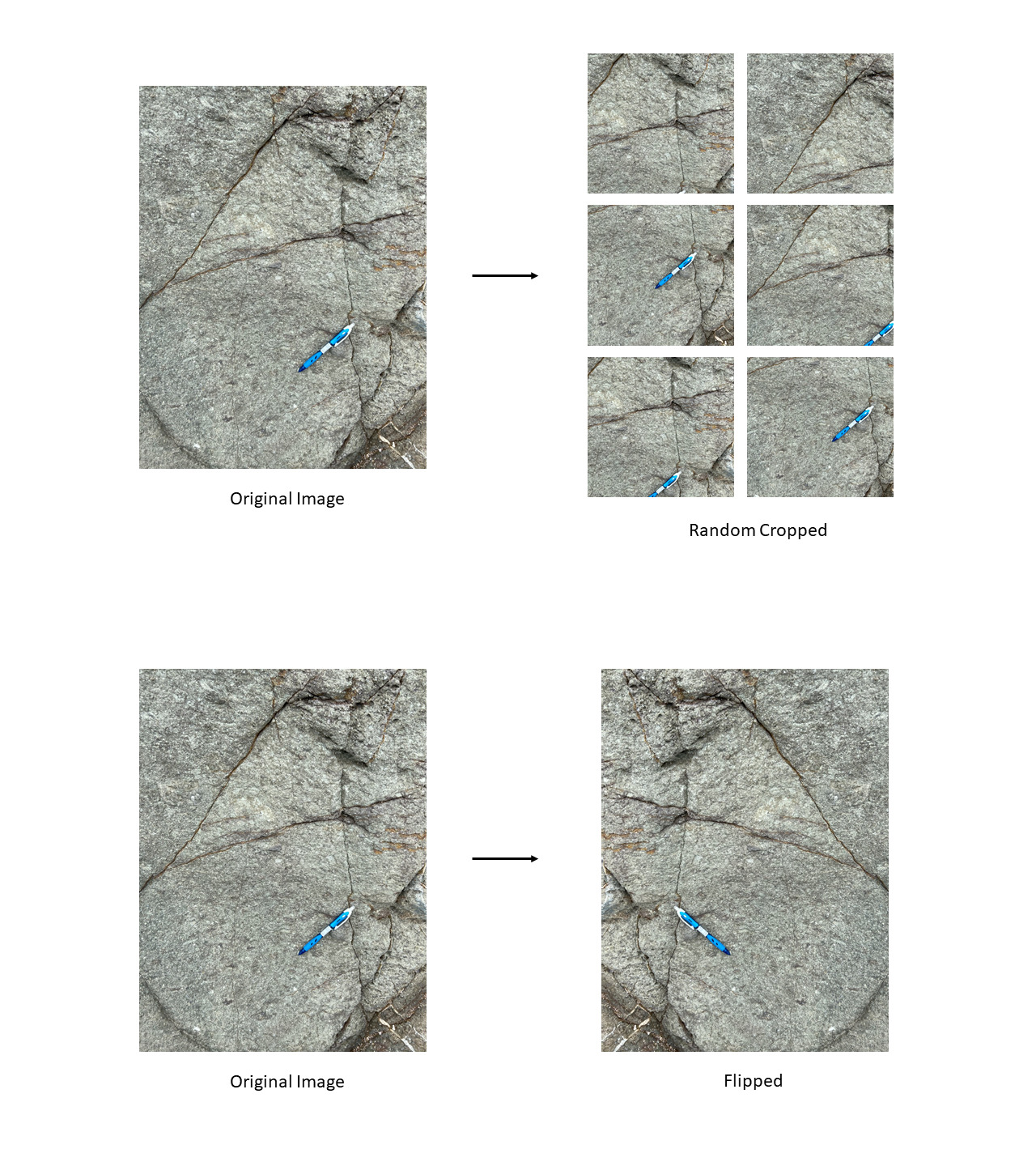
Data augmentation technique In the preparation of the dataset for rock fracture recognition, data augmentation was performed. This technique is commonly used for increasing the training dataset size and variability. Although the randomly-cropped samples and the flipped samples come from the same image, the processed samples are unique. This technique can prevent the problem of data scarcity and overfitting the model.

==== Discontinuity analyses ====
Discontinuities such as fault planes and bedding planes have important implications in civil engineering. Rock fractures can be recognized automatically by machine learning through photogrammetric analysis, even with the presence of interfering objects such as vegetation. In ML training for classifying images, data augmentation is a common practice to avoid overfitting and increase the training dataset size and variability. For example, in a study of rock fracture recognition, 68 images for training and 23 images for testing were prepared via random splitting. Data augmentation was performed, increasing the training dataset size to 8704 images by flipping and random cropping. The approach was able to recognize rock fractures accurately in most cases. Both the negative prediction value (NPV) and the specificity were over 0.99. This demonstrated the robustness of discontinuity analyses with machine learning.

Example applications in discontinuity analysis
Objective	Input dataset	Location	Machine learning algorithms (MLAs)	Performance
Recognition of rock fractures	Rock images collected in field survey	Gwanak Mountain and Bukhan Mountain, Seoul, Korea and Jeongseon-gun, Gangwon-do, Korea	Convolutional neural network (CNN)	The approach was able to recognize the rock fractures accurately in most cases. The NPV and the specificity were over 0.99.

==== Carbon dioxide leakage detection ====
Quantifying carbon dioxide leakage from a geological sequestration site has gained increased attention as the public is interested in whether carbon dioxide is stored underground safely and effectively. Carbon dioxide leakage from a geological sequestration site can be detected indirectly with the aid of remote sensing and an unsupervised clustering algorithm such as iterative self-organizing data analysis technique (ISODATA). The increase in soil CO_{2} concentration causes a stress response for plants by inhibiting plant respiration, as oxygen is displaced by carbon dioxide. The vegetation stress signal can be detected with the normalized difference red edge Index (NDRE). The hyperspectral images are processed by the unsupervised algorithm, clustering pixels with similar plant responses. The hyperspectral information in areas with known CO_{2} leakage is extracted so that areas with leakage can be matched with the clustered pixels with spectral anomalies. Although the approach can identify CO_{2} leakage efficiently, there are some limitations that require further study. The NDRE may not be accurate due to reasons like higher chlorophyll absorption, variation in vegetation, and shadowing effects; therefore, some stressed pixels can be incorrectly classed as healthy. Seasonality, groundwater table height may also affect the stress response to CO_{2} of the vegetation.

Example applications in carbon dioxide leakage detection
Objective	Input dataset	Location	Machine learning algorithms (MLAs)	Performance
Detection of CO_{2} leak from a geologic sequestration site	Aerial hyperspectral imagery	The Zero Emissions Research and Technology (ZERT), US	Iterative self-organizing data analysis technique (ISODATA) method	The approach was able to detect areas with CO_{2} leaks however other factors like the growing seasons of the vegetation also interfere with the results.

==== Quantification of water inflow ====
The rock mass rating (RMR) system is a widely adopted rock mass classification system by geomechanical means with the input of six parameters. The amount of water inflow is one of the inputs of the classification scheme, representing the groundwater condition. Quantification of the water inflow in the faces of a rock tunnel was traditionally carried out by visual observation in the field, which is labour and time-consuming, and fraught with safety concerns. Machine learning can determine water inflow by analyzing images taken on the construction site. The classification of the approach mostly follows the RMR system, but combining damp and wet states, as it is difficult to distinguish only by visual inspection. The images were classified into the non-damaged state, wet state, dripping state, flowing state, and gushing state. The accuracy of classifying the images was approximately 90%.

Example applications in quantification of water inflow
Objective	Input dataset	Location	Machine learning algorithms (MLAs)	Performance
Quantification of water inflow in rock tunnel faces	Images of water inflow	-	Convolutional neural network (CNN)	The approach achieved a mean accuracy of 93.01%.

=== Classification ===
==== Soil classification ====
The most popular cost-effective method od soil investigation method is cone penetration testing (CPT). The test is carried out by pushing a metallic cone through the soil: the force required to push at a constant rate is recorded as a quasi-continuous log. Machine learning can classify soil with the input of CPT data. In an attempt to classify with ML, there are two tasks required to analyze the data, namely segmentation and classification. Segmentation can be carried out with the constraint clustering and classification (CONCC) algorithm to split a single series data into segments. Classification can then be carried out by algorithms such as decision trees, SVMs, or neural networks.

Example applications in soil classification
Objective	Input dataset	Location	Machine learning algorithms (MLAs)	Performance
Soil classification	Cone penetration test (CPT) logs	-	Decision trees, artificial neural network (ANN), support vector machine	The artificial neural network (ANN) outperformed the others in classifying humus clay and peat, while decision trees outperformed the others in classifying clayey peat. SVMs gave the poorest performance among the three.

==== Geological structure classification ====
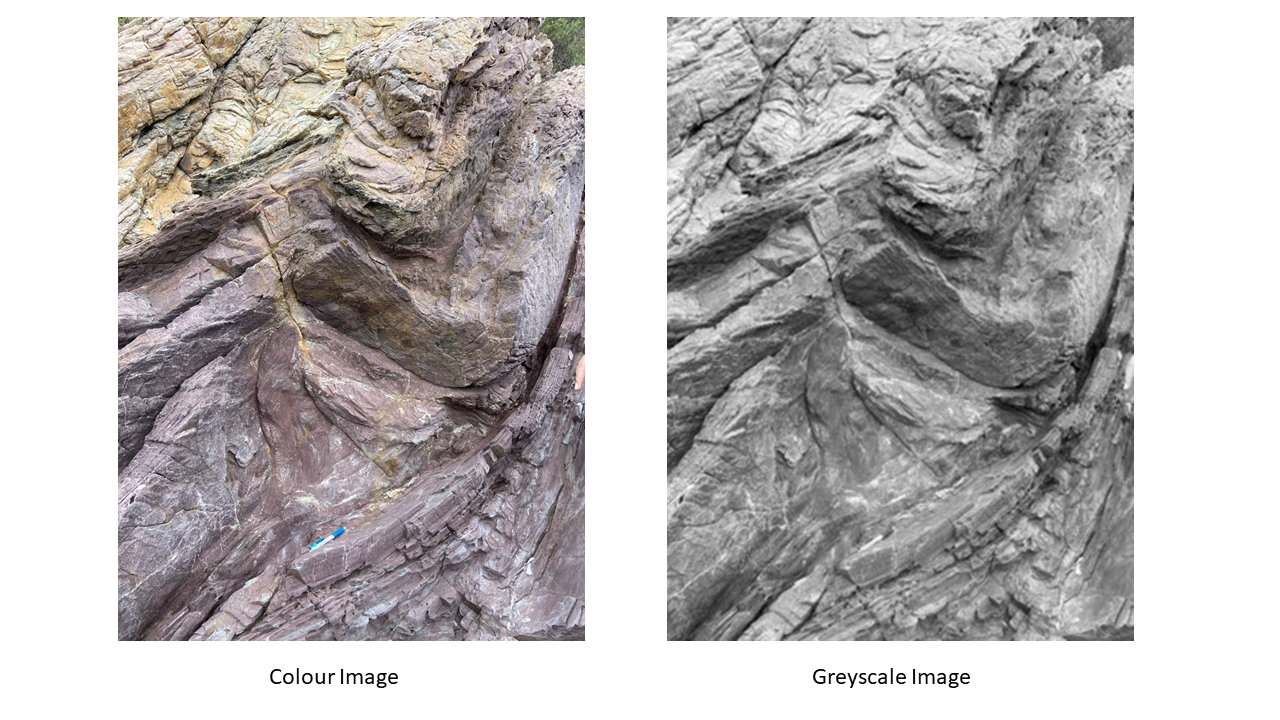
Effect of colour image and greyscale image The figure shows an image of a fold. The left image shows a colour image, while the one in the right shows a grayscale image. The difference in the accuracy of classifying the geological structure between colour images and grayscale images is little.

Exposed geological structures such as anticlines, ripple marks, and xenoliths can be identified automatically with deep learning models. Research has demonstrated that three-layer CNNs and transfer learning have strong accuracy (about 80% and 90% respectively), while others like k-nearest neighbors (k-NN), regular neural nets, and extreme gradient boosting (XGBoost) have low accuracies (ranging from 10% - 30%). The grayscale images and colour images were both tested, with the accuracy difference being little, implying that colour is not very important in identifying geological structures.

Example applications in geological structure classification
Objective	Input dataset	Location	Machine learning algorithms (MLAs)	Performance
Geological structures classification	Images of geological structures	-	k-nearest neighbors (k-NN), artificial neural network (ANN), extreme gradient boosting (XGBoost), three-layer convolutional neural network (CNN), transfer learning	Three-layer convolutional neural network (CNN) and transfer learning reached accuracies of about 80% and 90% respectively, while others were low (10% to 30%).

=== Forecast and predictions ===
==== Earthquake early warning systems and forecasting ====
Earthquake warning systems are often vulnerable to local impulsive noise, therefore giving out false alerts. False alerts can be eliminated by discriminating the earthquake waveforms from noise signals with the aid of ML methods. The method consists of two parts, the first being unsupervised learning with a generative adversarial network (GAN) to learn and extract features of first-arrival P-waves, and the second being use of a random forest to discriminate P-waves. This approach achieved 99.2% in recognizing P-waves, and can avoid false triggers by noise signals with 98.4% accuracy.

Earthquakes can be produced in a laboratory settings to mimic real-world ones. With the help of machine learning, the patterns of acoustic signals as precursors for earthquakes can be identified. Predicting the time remaining before failure was demonstrated in a study with continuous acoustic time series data recorded from a fault. The algorithm applied was a random forest, trained with a set of slip events, performing strongly in predicting the time to failure. It identified acoustic signals to predict failures, with one of them being previously unidentified. Although this laboratory earthquake is not as complex as a natural one, progress was made that guides future earthquake prediction work.

Example applications in earthquake prediction
Objective	Input dataset	Location	Machine learning algorithms (MLAs)	Performance
Discriminating earthquake waveforms	Earthquake dataset	Southern California and Japan	Generative adversarial network (GAN), random forest	This approach can recognise P waves with 99.2% accuracy and avoid false triggers by noise signals with 98.4% accuracy.
Predicting time remaining for next earthquake	Continuous acoustic time series data	-	Random forest	The R^{2} value of the prediction reached 0.89, which demonstrated excellent performance.

==== Streamflow discharge prediction ====
Real-time streamflow data is integral for decision making (e.g., evacuations, or regulation of reservoir water levels during flooding). Streamflow data can be estimated by data provided by stream gauges, which measure the water level of a river. However, water and debris from flooding may damage stream gauges, resulting in lack of essential real-time data. The ability of machine learning to infer missing data enables it to predict streamflow with both historical stream gauge data and real-time data. Streamflow hydrology estimate using machine learning (SHEM) is a model that can serve this purpose. To verify its accuracies, the prediction result was compared with the actual recorded data, and the accuracies were found to be between 0.78 and 0.99.

Example applications in streamflow discharge prediction
Objective	Input dataset	Location	Machine learning algorithms (MLAs)	Performance
Streamflow estimate with data missing	Streamgage data from NWIS-Web	Four diverse watersheds in Idaho, US and Washington, US	Random forests	The estimates correlated well to the historical data of the discharges. The accuracy ranges from 0.78 to 0.99.

== Challenge ==
=== Inadequate training data ===
An adequate amount of training and validation data is required for machine learning. However, some very useful products like satellite remote sensing data only have decades of data since the 1970s. If one is interested in the yearly data, then only less than 50 samples are available. Such amount of data may not be adequate. In a study of automatic classification of geological structures, the weakness of the model is the small training dataset, even though with the help of data augmentation to increase the size of the dataset. Another study of predicting streamflow found that the accuracies depend on the availability of sufficient historical data, therefore sufficient training data determine the performance of machine learning. Inadequate training data may lead to a problem called overfitting. Overfitting causes inaccuracies in machine learning as the model learns about the noise and undesired details.

=== Limited by data input ===
Machine learning cannot carry out some of the tasks as a human does easily. For example, in the quantification of water inflow in rock tunnel faces by images for rock mass rating system (RMR), the damp and the wet state was not classified by machine learning because discriminating the two only by visual inspection is not possible. In some tasks, machine learning may not able to fully substitute manual work by a human.

=== Black-box operation ===
Black-box operation of some machine learning algorithms In a black-box operation, a user only know about the input and output but not the process. Artificial neural network (ANN) is an example of a black-box operation. The user has no way to understand the logic of the hidden layers.

In many machine learning algorithms, for example, artificial neural network (ANN), it is considered as 'black box' approach as clear relationships and descriptions of how the results are generated in the hidden layers are unknown. 'White-box' approach such as decision tree can reveal the algorithm details to the users. If one wants to investigate the relationships, such 'black-box' approaches are not suitable. However, the performances of 'black-box' algorithms are usually better.
