= Tanzania (disambiguation) =

Tanzania is a country on the Swahili Coast of the East African coast, composed of mainland Tanganyika and insular Zanzibar.

Tanzania may also refer to:

- Tanzania (spider), a genus of African jumping spider
- Mainland Tanzania, as opposed to insular Zanzibar, the former Tanganyika
- Tanzania craton, a geologic craton in Tanzania
- Open University of Tanzania, Dar Es Salaam, Tanzania
- Air Tanzania, an airline, the flag carrier of Tanzania

== See also ==
- Outline of Tanzania
- Tanzanian people
- Tanzanian sign languages
- Tanganyika (disambiguation)
- Zanzibar (disambiguation)
