= Makhan Singh (trade unionist) =

Kenyan trade unionist (1913–1973)

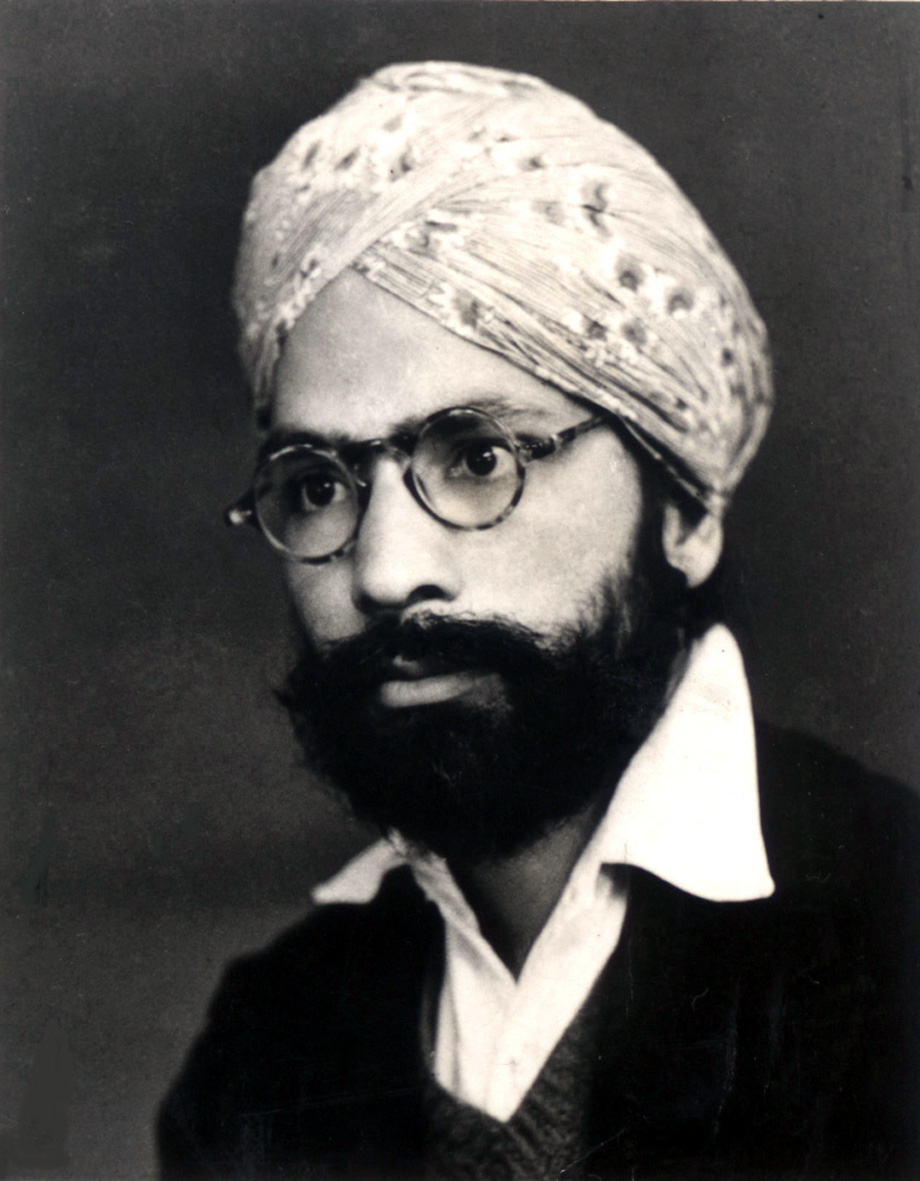
- Makhan Singh in Nairobi in 1947
- Born: 27 December 1913; Gujranwala, Punjab Province, British India
- Died: 18 May 1973 (aged 59); Nairobi, Kenya
- Resting place: Nairobi
- Citizenship: Kenyan
- Known for: Advancing the Trade Unionist movement in Kenya
- Notable work: History of Kenya's Trade Union Movement, to 1952 and various Ghadar Magazines

Makhan Singh Jabbal (27 December 1913 – 18 May 1973) was a Kenyan labour union leader who is credited with establishing the foundations of trade unionism in Kenya. He is credited to have played a vital role in the Kenyan independence movement. He was detained by the British colonialists for 11 years from 1950 to 1961 - the longest ever political detention in Kenya's history.

== Early life ==
Makhan Singh was born in Gharjakh, a village in Gujranwala District, in British India's Punjab Province to a Sikh family. In 1927, at the age of 13, he moved with his family to Nairobi, a municipality which, since 1905, had functioned as the administrative capital of the British East African protectorate.

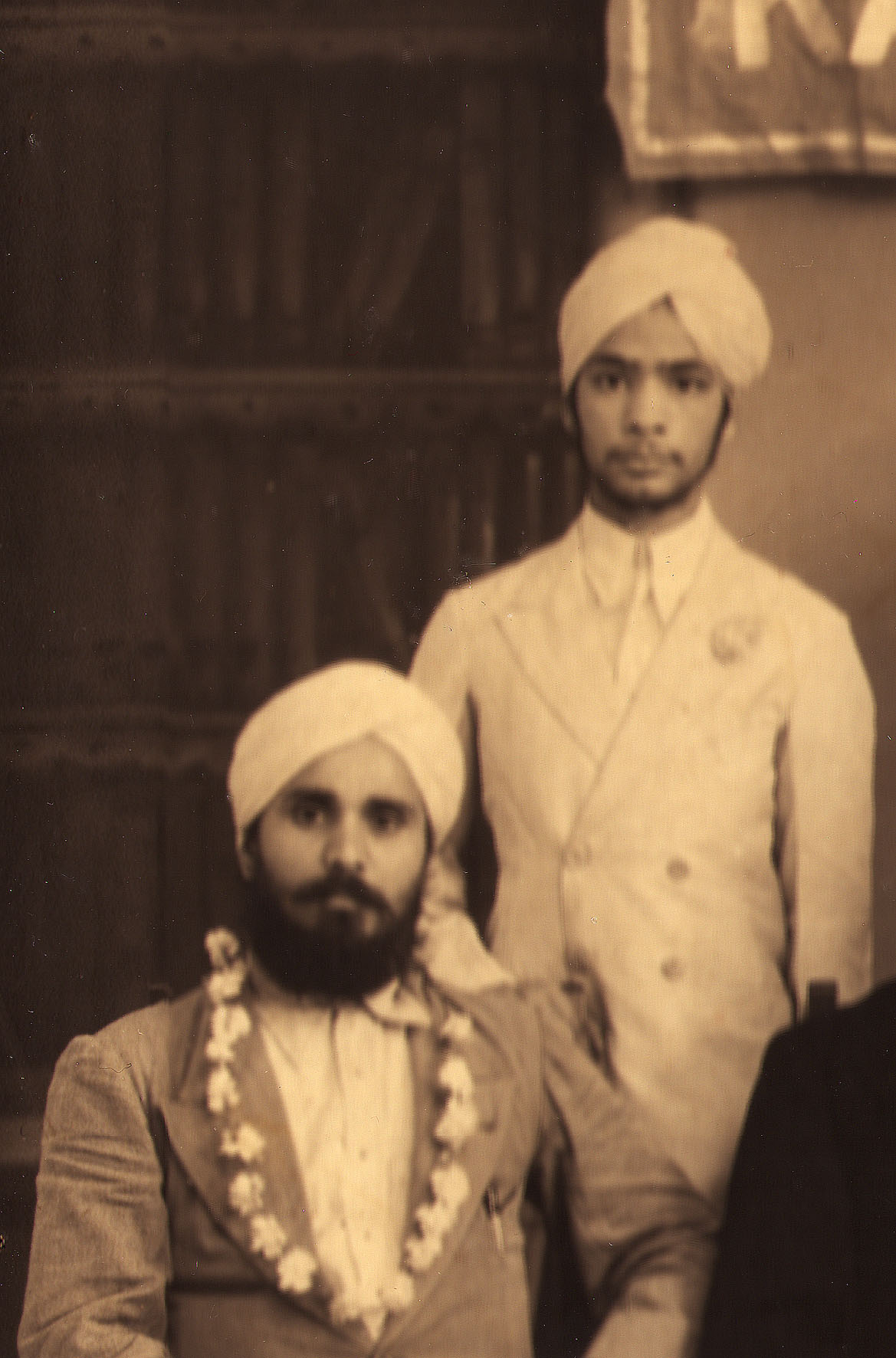
Gopal Singh (left) & Makhan Singh (right) aged 20, Nairobi, May 1933

== Indian independence movement ==
From the end of the Second World War he participated in the Indian independence movement from Kenya, where he was jailed in Gujarat Jail. He was freed after multiple fasts unto death.

The Indian Trade Union was formed in 1934 and Makhan Singh elected its secretary not long after, in March 1935. Soon, Makhan Singh convinced his nearly 500 fellow unionists to change the name of their association to the Labour Trade Union of Kenya and open membership to all, regardless of race. Singh's action at both a basic, semantic level and a broader, organizational level signalled his intent to break free of the political and racial narrowness of daily life in colonial Kenya. To this end, biographer Nazmi Durrani says, the union published its handouts in Kiswahili besides Punjabi, Gujarati and Urdu. This encourages us to believe that Makhan Singh's inclusion of Africans in his trade union activities was not merely symbolic and that he was determined to reach out to as wide a swathe of subjugated races as possible. He was arrested in 1943 and in January 1945, he was set free. Wasting no time, he took up work as a sub-editor at Jang-i-Azadi, the weekly published by the Punjab Committee of the Communist Party. Kenya was a centre of Ghadr Party until 1947. Three Punjabis Bishan Singh of village Gakhal Jalandhar, Ganesh Das and Yog Raj Bali of Rawalpindi were summarily tried and hanged to death in public in December 1915 for possessing and distributing Ghadr.

== Kenyan independence movement ==
In Kenya he had done something unprecedented. In the month of April, Makhan Singh gave a call in Nairobi for Uhuru Sasa, a Kiswahili expression meaning Freedom Now. For the first time, someone had commanded the British to grant complete independence to their territories in East Africa.

In 1935, he formed the Labour Trade Union of Kenya and, in 1949, he and Fred Kubai formed the East African Trade Union Congress, the first central organization of trade unions in Kenya.

After having spoken out in clear and strong terms against British occupation and colonial rule in Kenya on 23 April 1950 at Nairobi's Kaloleni Halls, Makhan Singh was arrested within 21 days on 15 May. He had inadvertently given the British colonial masters an opportunity to silence him. At a trial in Nyeri, Chanan Singh (later Justice Chanan Singh) defended him eloquently and with rigour. He was acquitted.

While in jail he still organized strikes and fasts. Although the greatest feat of his power was from 1951 to 1955, where he issued the Sector Nairobi, Kenya Trade Union to stop trading with Britain altogether. After he left jail in 1961 he was able to reset his Trade Union although Jomo Kenyatta and him, at the time partners with the same respect in society, were able to negotiate with the British to set up Kenya as a democracy, although he wanted it to be a Communist nation.

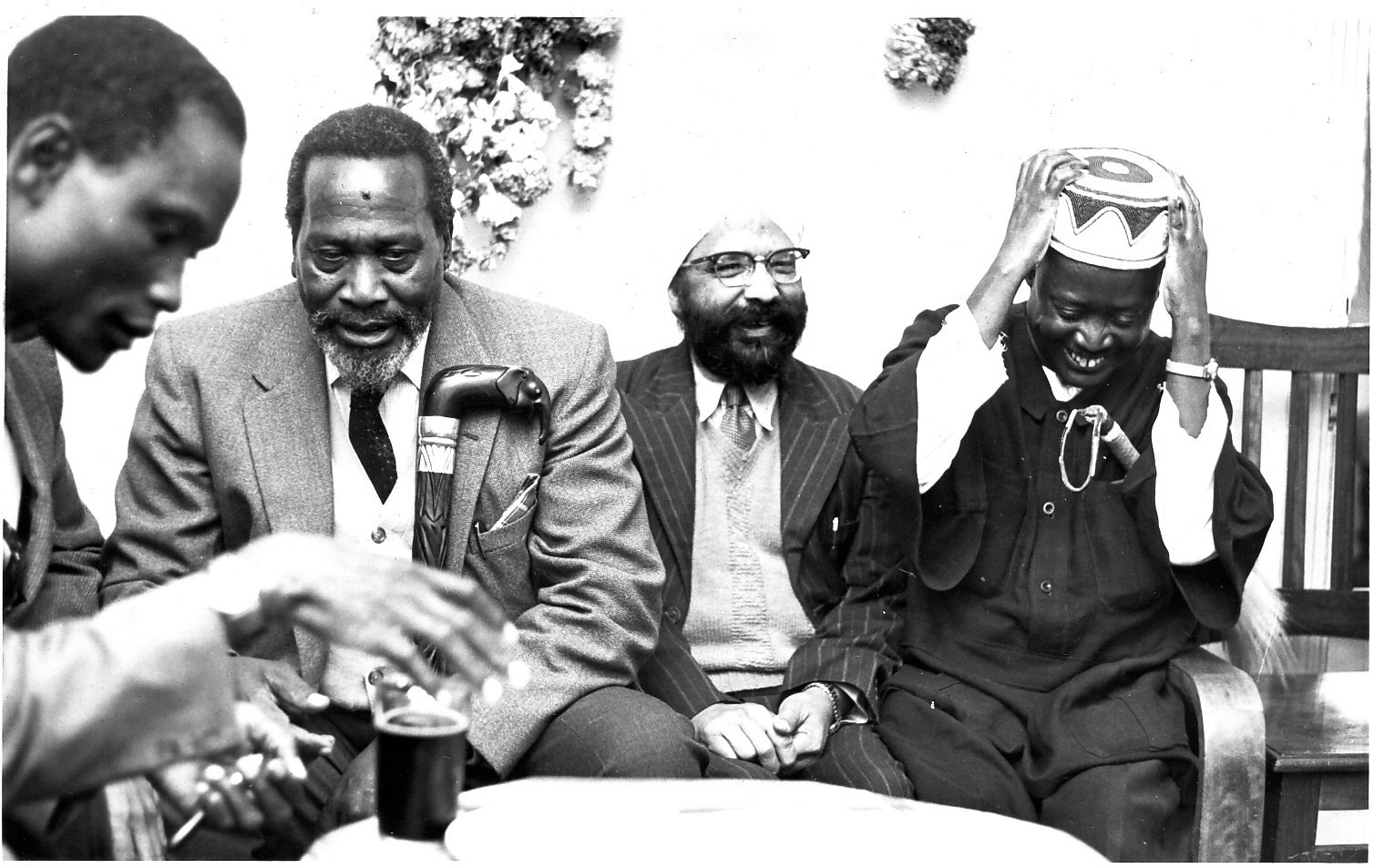
(left to right) Achieng Oneko, Jomo Kenyatta, Makhan Singh, Oginga Odinga, 1961

== Post-independence life ==
Post-independence, Makhan Singh was left out of any national involvement. Heartbroken, he became a social recluse and directed his mind to writing the history of Kenya's trade unionism in his volumes. He died of a heart attack on 18 May 1973 at the age of 59.
