= Economic geology =

Science concerned with earth materials of economic value

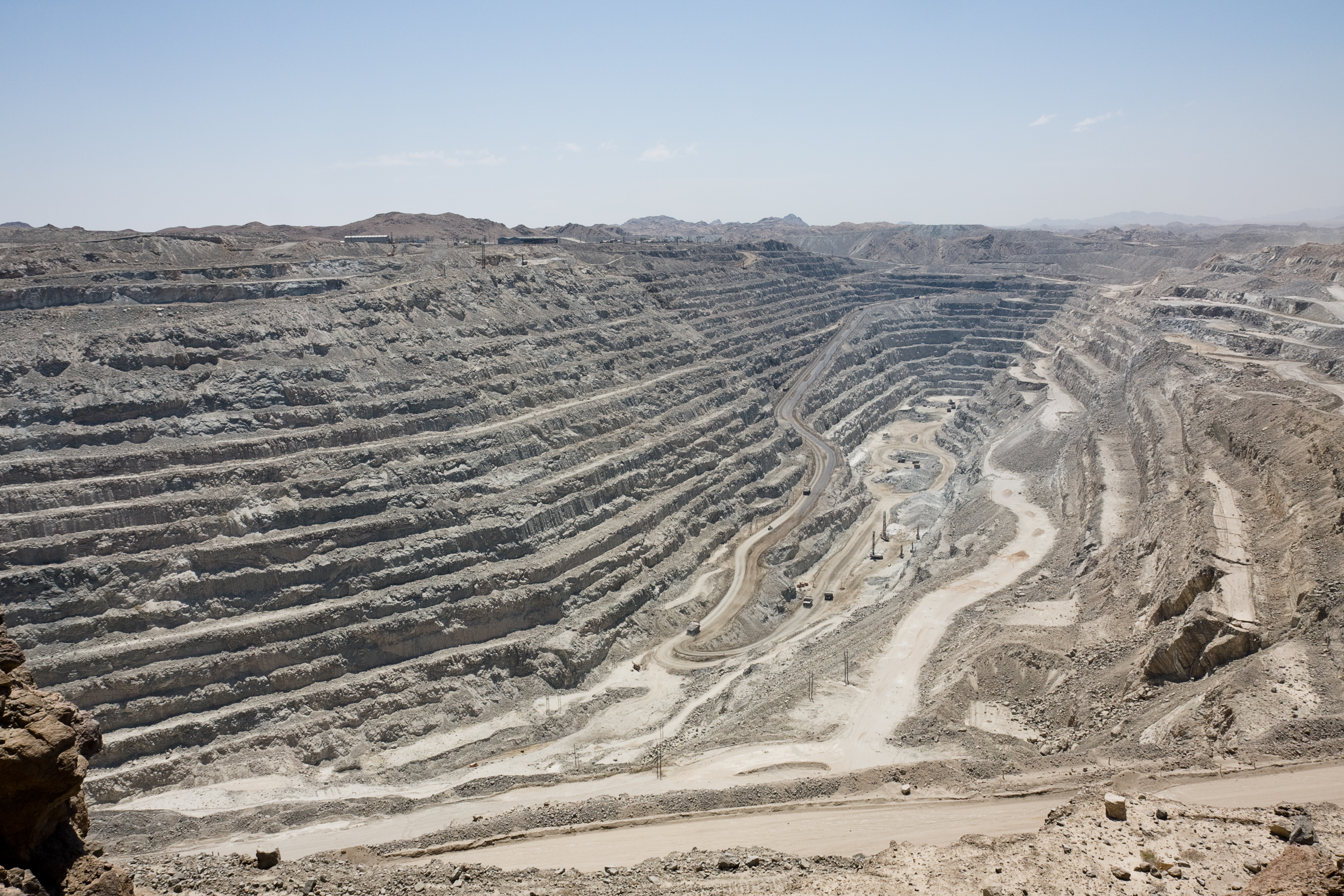
An open-pit uranium mine in Namibia

Economic geology is concerned with earth materials that can be used for economic and industrial purposes. These materials include precious and base metals, nonmetallic minerals and construction-grade stone. Economic geology is a subdiscipline of the geosciences; according to Lindgren (1933) it is “the application of geology”. It may be called the scientific study of the Earth's sources of mineral raw materials and the practical application of the acquired knowledge.

The study is primarily focused on metallic mineral deposits and mineral resources. The techniques employed by other Earth science disciplines (such as geochemistry, mineralogy, geophysics, petrology, paleontology and structural geology) might all be used to understand, describe and exploit an ore deposit.

Economic geology is studied and practiced by geologists. Economic geology may be of interest to other professions such as engineers, environmental scientists and conservationists because of the far-reaching impact that extractive industries have on society, the economy and the environment.

== Purpose of study ==
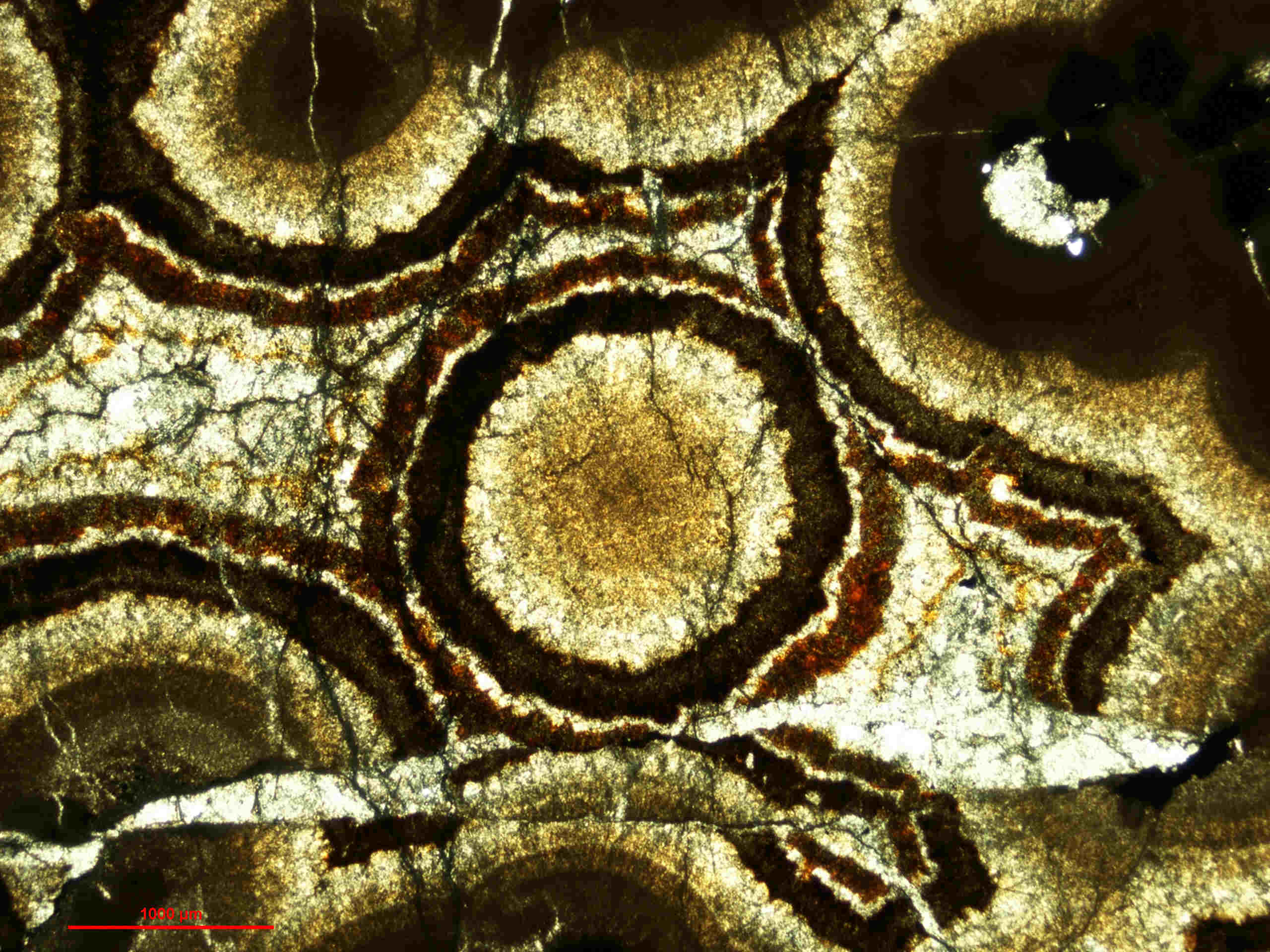
Coliform sphalerite from the Lisheen lead-zinc-silver mine, Ireland. Scale bar is 1000 microns.

The purpose of the study of economic geology is to gain understanding of the genesis and localization of ore deposits plus the minerals associated with ore deposits. Though metals, minerals and other geologic commodities are non-renewable in human time frames, the impression of a fixed or limited stock paradigm of scarcity has always led to human innovation resulting in a replacement commodity substituted for those commodities which become too expensive. Additionally the fixed stock of most mineral commodities is huge (e.g., copper within the Earth's crust given current rates of consumption would last for more than 100 million years.) Nonetheless, economic geologists continue to successfully expand and define known mineral resources.

== Mineral resources ==
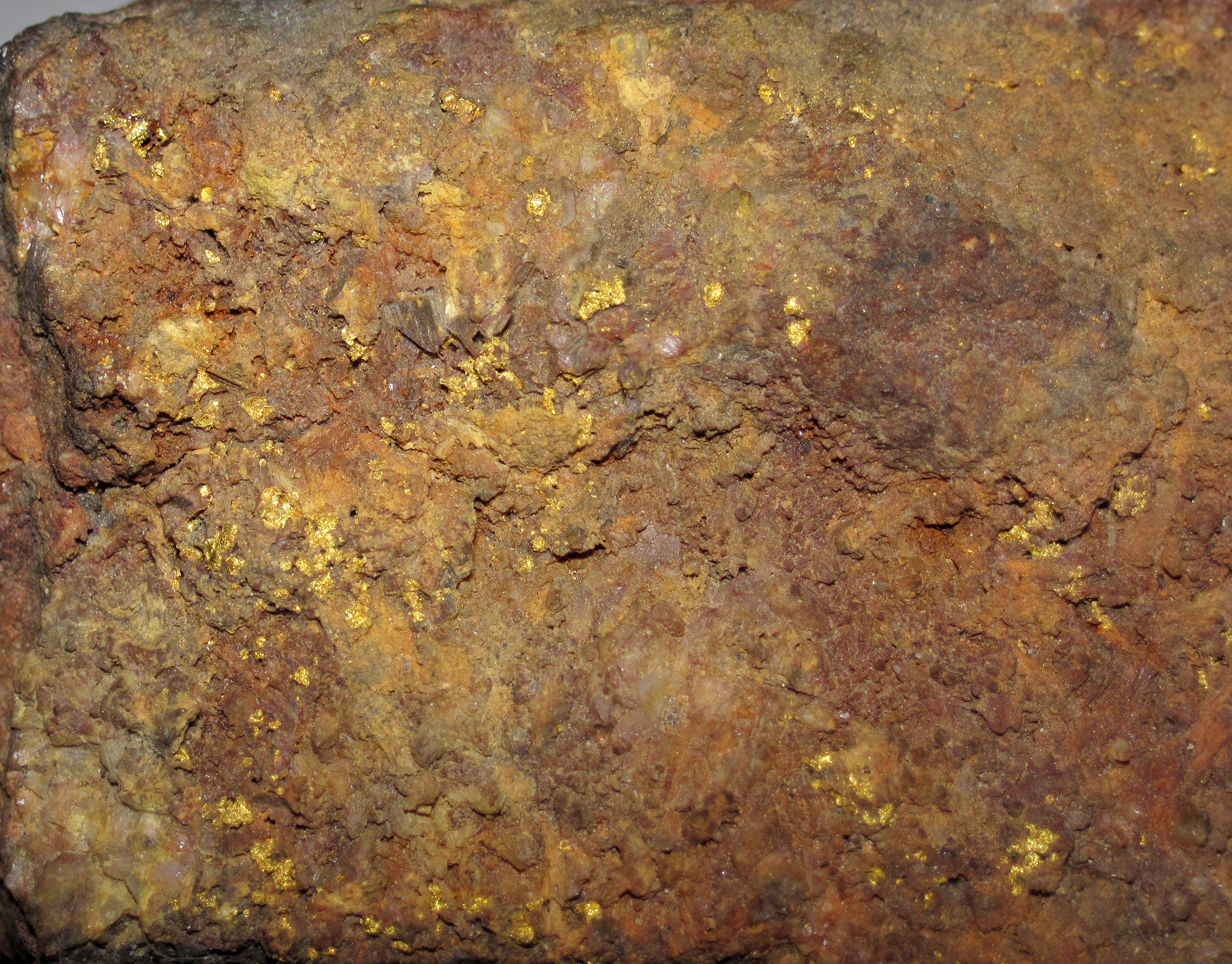
Roasted gold ore from Cripple Creek, Colorado. Field of view ~4.5 centimeters across.

Mineral resources are concentrations of minerals significant for current and future societal needs. Ore is classified as mineralization economically and technically feasible for extraction. Not all mineralization meets these criteria for various reasons. The specific categories of mineralization in an economic sense are:

- Mineral occurrences or prospects of geological interest but not necessarily economic interest
- Mineral resources include those potentially economically and technically feasible and those that are not
- Ore reserves, which must be economically and technically feasible to extract

== Ore ==
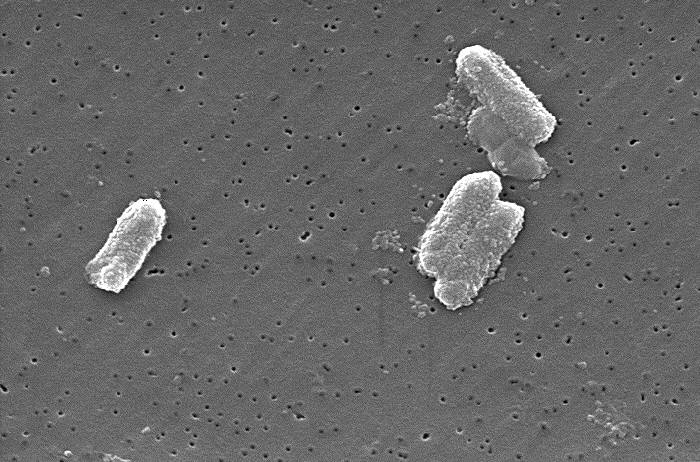
Citrobacter species can have concentrations of uranium in their bodies 300 times higher than in the surrounding environment.

Geologists are involved in the study of ore deposits, which includes the study of ore genesis and the processes within the Earth's crust that form and concentrate ore minerals into economically viable quantities.

Study of metallic ore deposits involves the use of structural geology, geochemistry, the study of metamorphism and its processes, as well as understanding metasomatism and other processes related to ore genesis.

Ore deposits are delineated by mineral exploration, which uses geochemical prospecting, drilling and resource estimation via geostatistics to quantify economic ore bodies. The ultimate aim of this process is mining.

== Coal and petroleum ==
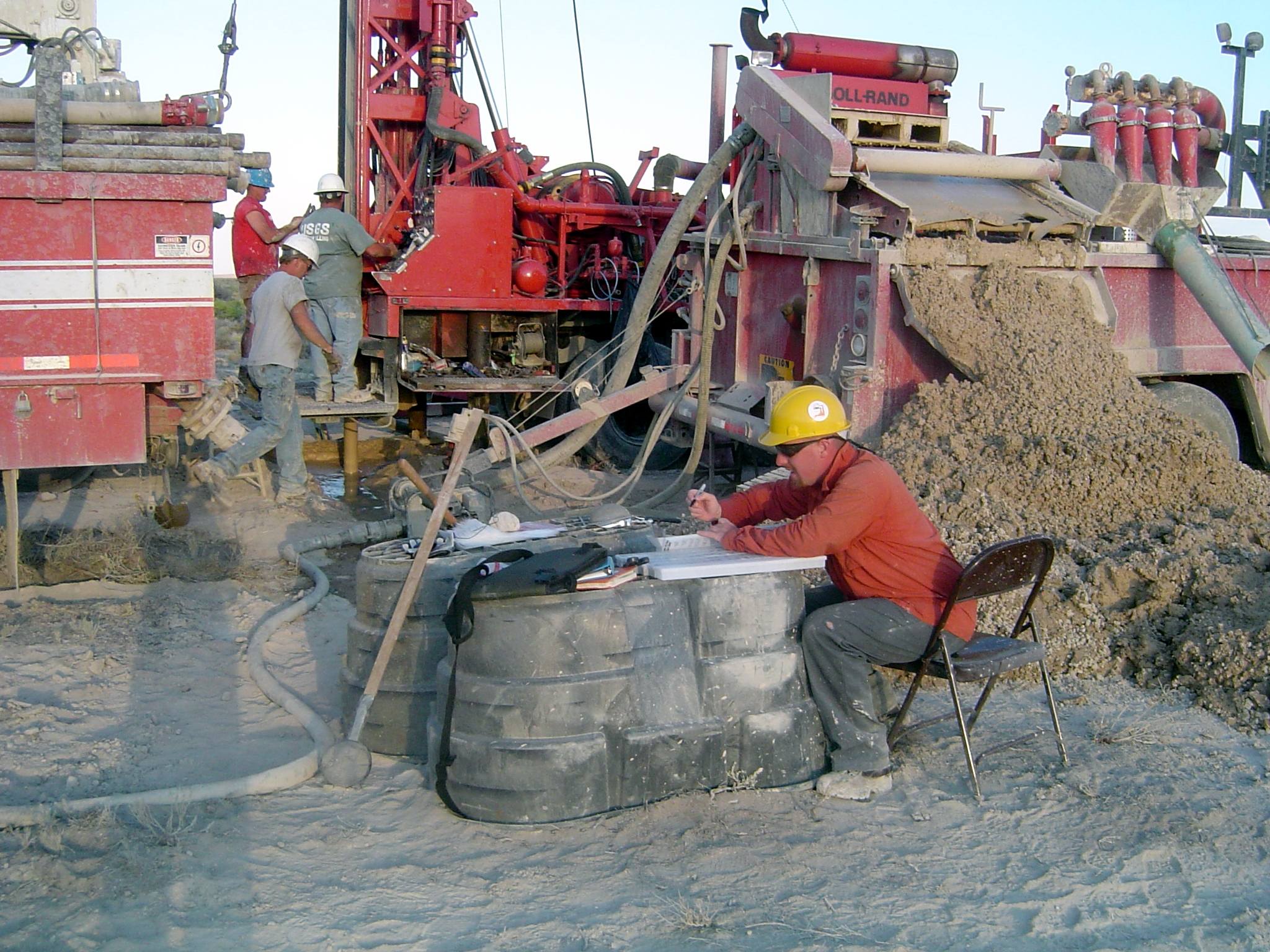
Mud log in process, a common way to study the lithology when drilling oil wells.

See main articles Coal and Petroleum geology

The study of sedimentology is of prime importance to the delineation of economic reserves of petroleum and coal energy resources.

== See also ==
- Mineral economics
- Mineral resource classification
- Ore
- Ore genesis
- Coal
- Valuation (finance) § Valuation of mining projects
