= Mineral economics =

Mineral economics is the subfield of economics that investigates economic policy issues around the production and use of mineral commodities.

The field examines the implications associated with the mining industry and the impact the industry has socially, economically and environmentally. The field originally started after the Second World War, and has expanded in today's modern climate. The identification of mineral sectors, their associated total revenue from specific commodities, and its variation across countries is significant for global trade in the industry. For example, Australia is a leading exporter of several mineral commodities like iron and coal, which provides a substantial percentage of revenue within their economy.

== History ==
From the late 1980s to early 1990s the demand for minerals and downstream products was weak compared to previous decades.

However during the late 1990s, economic transition became increasingly relevant across the globe, spurring increased demand in the mining sector from countries like China. Foreign investment and trade increased.

== Global integration ==
Mining is a global industry. The Mining Contribution Index WIDER (MCI-W) ranked the Countries with the largest mining contribution in 2014. In descending order, DRC, Chile, Australia, Mongolia and Papua New Guinea are the countries with the largest extraction of minerals globally.

The impact of distributing such mineral commodities has a major effect on the economy internationally, often contributing to employment and generating income.

== Sector in Australia ==
Australia is the developed country most involved in mineral extraction. The country's largest exports include coal, oil, natural gas, metal ores, non-metals, and construction materials. These exports account for a substantial portion of revenue in the Australian economy.

Because of its economic relevance, especially when compared to other developed countries, the mining sector has major influence on Australian government policies, systematically shaping legislation and regulation in favorable ways for mine owners. This is a common occurrence in many countries with large resource wealth, and can often be referred to as Dutch disease.

== Australia's economy and contribution ==
The mineral sector is a major contributor to the Australian economy. The Australian mineral sector contributes ‘8 per cent of Gross Domestic Product’ into the economy. Australia's exportation of black coal, iron ore, alumina, lead and zinc is identified as the largest global distributor.

However, because mining is capital intensive, meaning it relies heavily on machinery, the industry ultimately only supplements ‘2% of jobs’ within the sector, having minimal impact on overall economic benefit.

== Sustainability concerns ==
Given that many minerals are a finite resource, it can be difficult for operations to reach meaningful levels of sustainability. There are significant concerns are present regarding the sustainability of mineral extraction, and these concerns are a central aspect of the recycling movement . While the mineral sector provides a substantial income into the economy, and is a fundamental input for many industrial products like steel or concrete, the environmental concerns of the industry cannot be understated.

At the same time, the scarcity of mineral resources is what gives them their value, and so mine operators have incentive to not flood their market and to avoid over mining. However, this macro incentive is weak compared to the profits that could be made at an individual mine by maximizing the production when demand is high. As such, strong government regulation is key to maintaining a sustainable mining sector in a country's economy.

== Future ==
The future of minerals and their integration within society relies heavily on mineral economics and the policies constructed. The integration of sustainable energy supplementation reveals concerns regarding the success and future of mineral usage, however technological advancements can not ‘replace energy’ entirely. Despite the current concerns of mineral availability in the future and an expected decline in minerals, a precedented increase of associated costs regarding mineral commodities is precedented. This heightens the necessity of implementing technologies and sustainable practices ensuring longevity of mineral resources and sectors, through recycling mineral resources and ensuring adequate policies are constructed reflective of both trade and exports.

== See also ==
- Economic geology
- Mineral resource classification
- Valuation (finance) § Valuation of mining projects
- Economy of Australia
