= Ahlfeldite =

Mineral

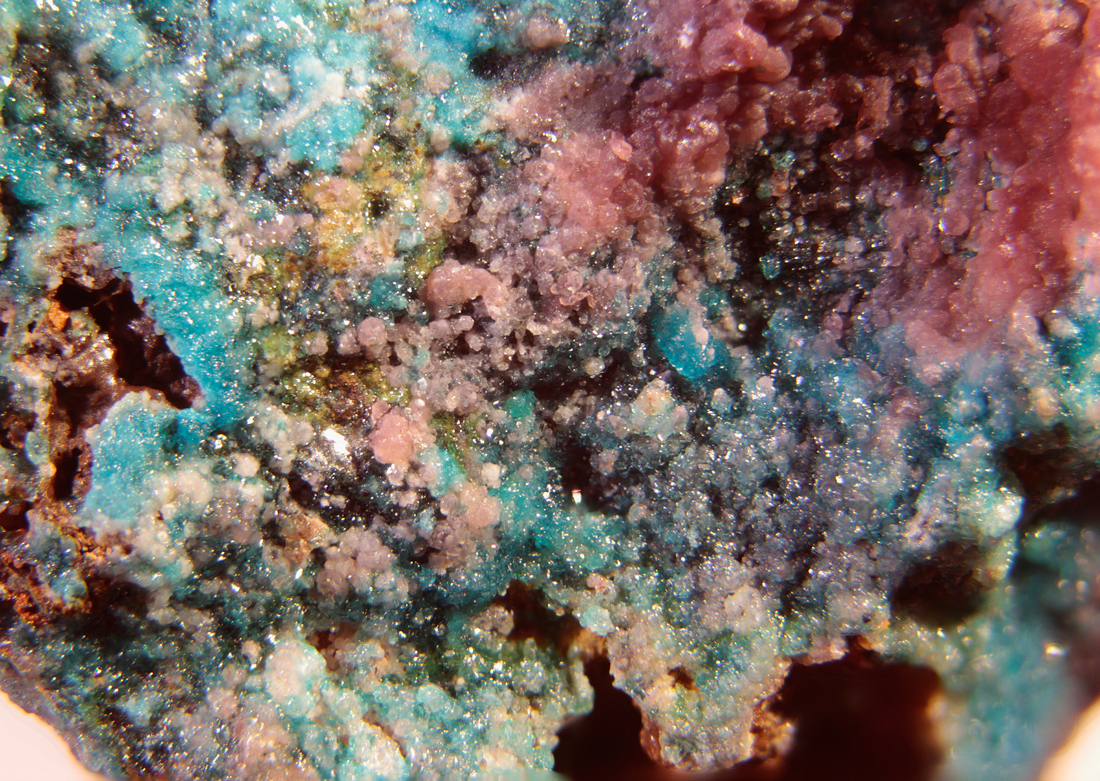
- Alfredopetrovite, Ahlfeldite, Chalcomenite

General
- Category: Selenite mineral
- Formula: (Ni,Co)SeO_{3}·2H_{2}O
- IMA symbol: Afe
- Strunz classification: 4.JH.10
- Crystal system: Monoclinic
- Crystal class: Prismatic (2/m) (same H-M symbol)
- Space group: P2_{1}/m

Identification

Ahlfeldite ((Ni, Co)SeO_{3}]·2H_{2}O) is a mineral of secondary origin. It is named after Friedrich Ahlfeld (1892–1982), a German-Bolivian mining engineer and geologist. Its type locality is Virgen de Surumi mine, Pakajake Canyon, Chayanta Province, Potosí Department, Bolivia.
