= Kilwa (disambiguation) =

Kilwa may refer to the following places in Africa:

== In Tanzania ==
- Kilwa Kisiwani, an Indian Ocean island and historic Swahili city-state
- Kilwa Masoko, a mainland port across from Kilwa Kisiwani
- Kilwa District, a district of Lindi Region
- Kilwa Sultanate, a medieval Swahili sultanate

== In Saudi Arabia ==
- Qilwah, a governorate in the Al-Baha Province of Saudi Arabia
- Kilwa (Saudi Arabia), an archaeological site in the Tabuk Province of Saudi Arabia

== On Lake Mweru ==
- Kilwa, Democratic Republic of the Congo, a town on the south-west shore of Lake Mweru
- Kilwa Island, a Zambian lake island close to the Congolese town
