= Zanzibar (disambiguation) =

Zanzibar is an autonomous part of Tanzania.

Zanzibar may also refer to:

== Geography ==
All related to the insular autonomous region of Tanzania are:

- Unguja, also referred to as "Zanzibar Island" or simply "Zanzibar", one of the two major islands of Zanzibar
- Zanzibar City, the capital of the Zanzibar
- Zanzibar Archipelago, an island group off the coast of East Africa consisting of the islands of Zanzibar plus Mafia Island
- Sultanate of Zanzibar, a country between 1856 and 1964 (from 1890 onward a protectorate of the United Kingdom), which comprised the Zanzibar Archipelago and parts of the east coast of what is today Tanzania
- People's Republic of Zanzibar, a short-lived state consisting of the islands of the Zanzibar, which was proclaimed and then merged into the newly formed Tanzania in 1964

== Music ==
- "Zanzibar" (song), a song by Billy Joel from 52nd Street (1978)
- "Zanzibar", a song by Gordon Haskell
- "Zanzibar", a song by Suburban Legends on the album Rump Shaker
- "Zanzibar", a song by Lizzy Borden on the album Deal with the Devil
- "Zanzibar", a song by Arabesque

== Entertainment ==
- Zanzibar (film), a 1940 American film
- Zanzibar (G.I. Joe), a fictional modern-day pirate character in the G.I. Joe universe, member of the Dreadnoks
- "Zanzibar" (Inside No. 9), series 4 episode 1 (2018)
- Zanzibar (novel), a 2002 novel by Giles Foden
- Zanzibarland, a fictional country in the video game Metal Gear 2: Solid Snake
- An episode of Rocko's Modern Life

== Transportation and vehicles ==
- HMS Zanzibar, a British frigate in the commission in the Royal Navy from 1944 to 1946
- 45638 Zanzibar, a British LMS Jubilee Class locomotive
- Zanzibar, a fictional ship in The Wreck of the Zanzibar by Michael Morpurgo

== Other ==
- Zanzibar Tavern, an adult entertainment nightclub in Toronto, Canada
- Zanzibar, a brand of kreteks from Dhanraj International
- Club Zanzibar
- Google Zanzibar a distributed authorization system

== See also ==
- United Republic of Tanganyika and Zanzibar, predecessor of Tanzania
- Zanabazar, Mongolian religious leader and polymath
- Zinjibar, capital of the Abyan Governorate in Yemen whose name has the same origin as Zanzibar
- Zingiber, the genus of plants that are the source of ginger
- Tanzania (disambiguation)
