= Tanganyika =

Tanganyika may refer to:

== Places ==
- Tanganyika (1961–1964), a sovereign state, comprising the mainland part of present-day Tanzania
- Tanganyika Territory (1916–1961), a former British territory which preceded the sovereign state
- Tanzania Mainland, the current area of the former country state and territory of Tanganyika
- Lake Tanganyika, an African Great Lake
- Tanganyika Province, a province in the Democratic Republic of the Congo
  - Tanganika District, a former district of Katanga Province that became Tanganyika Province in 2015

== Other uses ==
- Tanganyika (film), a 1954 action adventure film
- Tanganyika (album), a 1956 album by Buddy Collette
- HMS Tanganyika, an Algerine-class minesweeper

== See also ==
- United Republic of Tanganyika and Zanzibar, the predecessor of Tanzania
- Tanzania (disambiguation)
