= Prospectivity mapping =

Prospectivity mapping, also known as mineral prospectivity mapping or mineral potential mapping, defines a process used to make better use of mineral exploration data. Geological and geophysical datasets, such as lithological, structural and topographical maps, aeromagnetic, gravity and radiometric imagery are the typical datasets used in the construction of prospectivity maps.

There are two main approaches to prospectivity mapping: data-driven and knowledge-driven.

In areas with significant known mineralisation, a data-driven approach can be adopted in which known deposits are analysed in relation to the surrounding geology. A number of parametric and non-parametric statistical tests can be used to determine if identified spatial relationships are considered statistically significant. Important relationships are then spatially quantified over the entire region of interest. Ultimately multiple quantified relationships are combined, typically using a geographic information system (GIS) into a single prospectivity map.

In areas with little known mineralisation, a knowledge-driven approach can be implemented in which a mineral-systems approach is used in which theories about the formation of the deposit are identified, spatially quantified and then combined using a GIS.

Prospectivity mapping can be constructed using a mix of data-driven and knowledge-driven components and these are often referred to as hybrid prospectivity maps.
