= Opiyo Wandayi =

Kenyan Politician

Honourable James Opiyo Wandayi
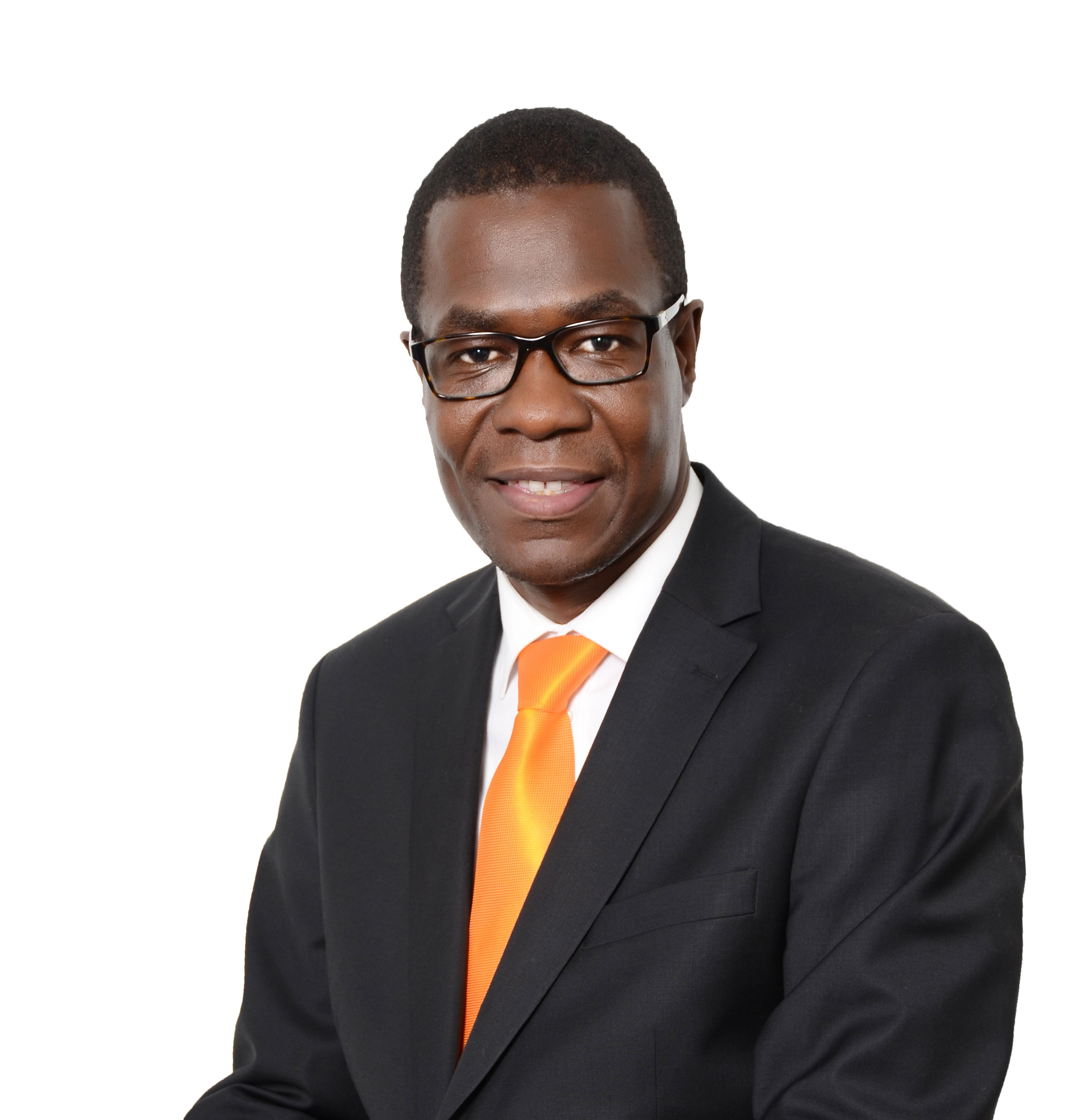
- Preceded by: John Mbadi
- Constituency: Ugunja

Cabinet Secretary of Energy

Minority Leader of The Kenya National Assembly

Personal details
- Born: 22 June 1972 (age 54) Muhola, Sidindi Ward
- Citizenship: Kenya
- Party: Orange Democratic Movement (ODM)
- Education: University of Nairobi; Kenya Institute of Management; Jomo Kenyatta University of Agriculture and Technology; Daystar University
- Occupation: Politician

James Opiyo Wandayi MGH, CBS (born 22 June 1972) is an agricultural and development economist and Kenyan politician currently serving as the Cabinet secretary of Energy and Petroleum.

== Early life and education ==
Wandayi received his Kenya Certificate of Primary of Education (KCPE) from Sikalame Primary School in 1986. He then enrolled in Sawagongo High School where he received Kenya Certificate of Secondary Education in 1990 and enrolled in University of Nairobi to pursue Bachelor of Science in Agriculture. He joined Kenya Institute of Management in 2008 for Diploma in Business Management. In 2010 he joined Jomo Kenyatta University of Agriculture and Technology for MBA Executive. He is currently pursuing LLB at Daystar University.

== Political career ==
Wandayi is a member of parliament representing the Ugunja Constituency in Siaya county. He is a member of Orange Democratic Movement and a coalition member of Coalition for Reforms and Democracy.

He was once ejected from parliament after disrupting President Kenyatta's State of the Nation address by constantly blowing a whistle. He was given a suspension from parliament from March until the end of the session. He challenged the action by the Speaker before the High court which ordered he be allowed back to the House citing that his electorate were not being represented.

== Controversy ==
=== Unlawful Assembly and Destruction of Private Property ===
On 20 March 2023 it was widely reported that Wandayi along with some Azimio members of parliament were involved in destruction of private property while he was a Minority Leader of parliament during an unlawful assembly. In the same month, Wandayi along with the involved Azimio members of parliament were arrested and charged in court for damaging the vehicle of Joyce Nyambura while conducting an unlawful assembly within Nairobi along city Hall way.

According to the arrested Azimio members of Parliament, they had planned to kick off their march to State House to "claim their victory" following Ruto's 2022 presidential election win whose victory they opposed. In the same matter Azimio accused police of siding with the government instead of being non-partisan. In April 2023, the DPP dropped the charges against Wandayi to pave way for an alternative settlement between the aggrieved parties.

=== Petroleum importation scandal ===
In April 2026 Wandayi was called out by lawmakers and Kenyans to resign after his ministry was involved in a Ksh.12 billon oil importation scandal. The importation was found to have been outside the G-to-G framework introduced by the Kenyan government in 2023 to stabilize fuel supply and ease foreign exchange pressure. Principle secretary in the Ministry of Energy Mohamed Liban, Kenya pipeline CEO Joe Sang and EPRA director general Daniel Kiptoo resigned after being arrested and found with millions worth of stacks of cash in their houses in line with the scandal. Wandayi distanced himself from the scandal affirming that he was the one who alerted the president on the malfeasance as soon as he got wind of it, claiming that he did not approve the importation.

== Honors ==
Honors received by Opiyo include:

- Moran of the Order of the Golden Heart of Kenya (MGH)
- Chief of the Order of the Burning Spear (CBS)

== See also ==
- 13th Parliament of Kenya
- Ugunja Constituency
