= Joe Ageyo =

Kenyan television journalist

Dr. Joe Ageyo is a Kenyan television journalist working for NTV Kenya.

== Education and career ==
Ageyo is an alumnus of Sawagongo High School. He holds a PhD in Media Studies from Daystar University, an MSc in Environmental Governance from the University of Manchester, a Bachelor of Agribusiness Management from Egerton University, a Post-Graduate Diploma in Mass Communication from the University of Nairobi, and a certificate in Advanced Studies in Environmental Diplomacy from the University of Geneva, Switzerland.H].

Ageyo joined KTN in 2000 as a general news reporter, but his work was focused on environmental stories. He was the Managing Editor at the same station. He is widely acclaimed as having pioneered Environmental Journalism on Kenyan television. He was the first Kenyan TV journalist to start a regular slot for an environmental feature, Ecojournal. He has won prestigious awards such the "Environmental Journalist of the Year" in 2001 staged by the National Media Trust, a World Bank fellowship to attend the 2002 World Summit on Sustainable Development in Johannesburg and is a fellow of the Climate Change Media Partnership (CCMP) and a Catto Fellow at the Aspen Institute in Colorado. He worked for NTV, a private station owned by the Nation Media Group from February 2005 to November 2012, holding various positions including the last one, as Head of News Production. He has also worked for the Kenya Broadcasting Corporation as well as Royal Media Services.

== Awards ==
He won the Environmental Journalist of the Year' in 2001 staged by the National Media Trust Ageyo is a managing editor with KTN TV station. He moderated the second edition of the historic presidential debate held at Brook House School, Nairobi on Monday 25 February 2013 and also the 2017 Presidential Debate held at Catholic University of East Africa, Nairobi Kenya.
