= Ugunja Constituency =

Electoral constituency in Kenya

Ugunja
- constituency for the Parliament of Kenya
- Ugunja Constituency within Siaya County

- Siaya County within Kenya
- County: Siaya
- Population: 104,241
- Area: 201 km^{2} (77.6 sq mi)

Current constituency
- Number of members: 1
- Party: ODM
- Member of Parliament: Opiyo Wandayi
- Wards: 3

Ugunja is a constituency in Kenya. It was hived off from the larger Ugenya Constituency in 2013 and the two constituencies of Ugenya and Ugunja are roughly divided by River Nzoia except in a few areas. It is one of six constituencies in Siaya County.

It has three Wards; Ugunja, Sigomere and Sidindi.

WARD	LOCATIONS	SUBLOCATIONS
UGUNJA		Ugunja Ligega Umala Ngunya Rambula North Rambula South Magoya Umina
SIGOMERE	East Uholo North Uholo	Mung'ao Madungu Got Osimbo Sigomere East Ting'are West Ting'are East Asango West Asango
SIDINDI	Yiro Ruwe Rangala South Ugenya	Yiro West Yiro East Ruwe Simenya Rang'ala Uhuyi

== Members ==
Election	Member of Parliament	Party	Notes
2013	James Opiyo Wandayi	ODM	Inaugural MP for Ugunja Constituency.
2017	James Opiyo Wandayi	ODM	Re-elected; served as Chairperson of the Public Accounts Committee (PAC).
2022	James Opiyo Wandayi	ODM	Resigned in August 2024 after being appointed Cabinet Secretary for Energy and Petroleum.
2025 by-election	Moses Okoth Omondi	ODM	Elected in the November 2025 by-election to finish out the 13th Parliament term.
