= Sawagongo High School =

Secondary school in Kenya

Coordinates: 0°04′34″N 34°27′29″E

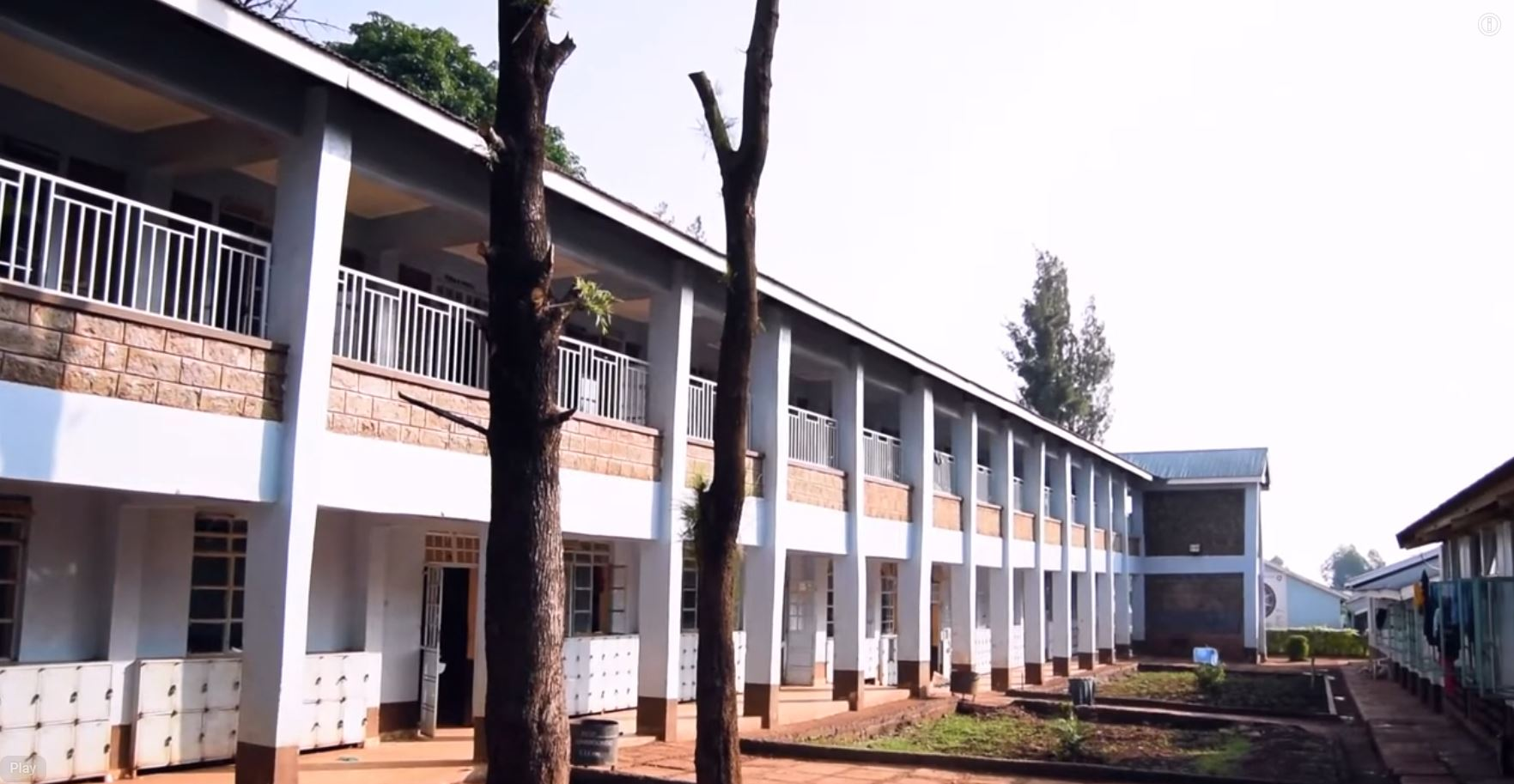
Sawagongo High School classrooms

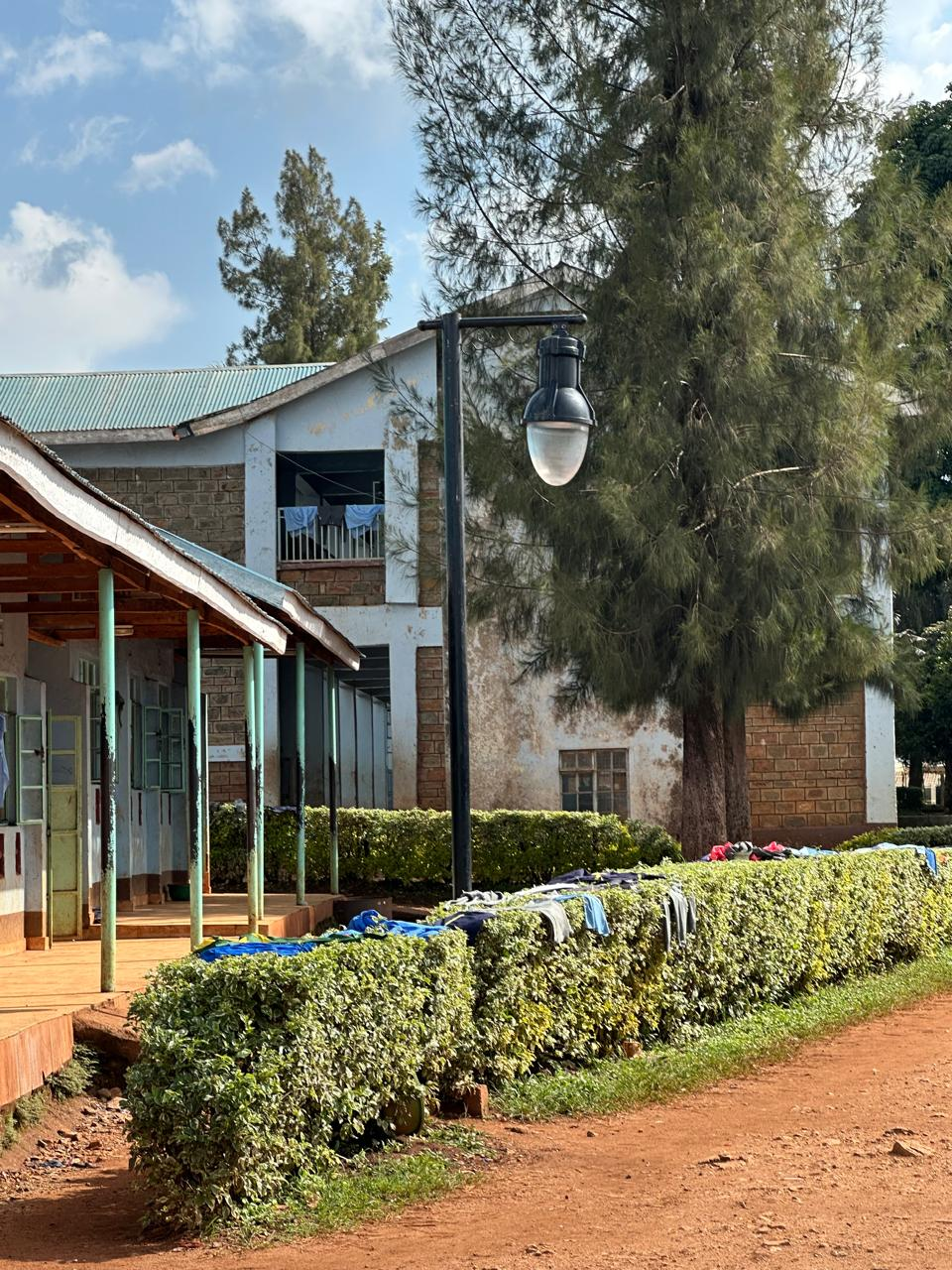
Section of Sawagongo High School

Sawagongo High School is a boys' national school located in Nyangweso (Gem Yala) location, Siaya County, Kenya. Anchored in the motto "Aspire to Excellence", the school is well known in Nyanza region as a paragon of academic and extra-curricular activities excellence. It is a major Nyanza Region heavyweight in Kenya Secondary Schools Sports Association (KSSSA) games across disciplines like basketball, handball, soccer and athletics. The school achieved an unprecedented three-peat by winning the Siaya District Secondary Schools Soccer Championship 1995-1997 under the guidance of Mr. Fred Odindo (the games master). In 2025 Sawagongo defeated the basketball heavyweights Agoro Sare 60-55 to clinch the Nyanza Regional basketball championship. The school has also done very well in "The Great Debaters Contest Kenya'", which highlights high school students eloquence and critical thinking across the region.

== History ==
In the KCSE of 2023 the school attained a mean score of 10.138 (B+ average). It produced 27 As, 100B+s, 53Bs and 8 B-s. The school also focuses on extra-curricular activities such as drama, music, soccer, basketball, athletics, hockey and volleyball. The current head of the school Senior Principal Henry Airo Oyuga took over from the Chief Principal Maurice Ogutu, who retired at the end of 2025 after a 35-years career in the education sector. The Chief Maurice Ogutu Scholarship at Sawagongo aims to support the academically gifted students who are financially challenged. Former principals of the school includes Boniface Onyango (fondly referred to as "Kips"), Mr. Ogot (retired in 2006), Mr. Wasambo (2006-2008), Mr. Samuel Kaunda and Mr. Edward Wachilonga.

Past Heads of the school:

- Mr. Maurice Ogutu (2021–2025)
- Mr. Edward Wachilonga (2017–2021)
- Mr. Samuel Kaunda Ogweno (2009–2017)
- Mr. Daniel Wasambo (2006–2009)
- Mr. Martin Ogot (Late 1990s–2006)
- Mr. Boniface Onyango (1987–1992)
- Mr. Noah Ochieng (1985–1987)
- Mr. Arthur Martin Mwango (1981–1985)
- Mr. Ernest J. Were (1974–1980)
- Mr. Paul Mulanda / Mr. Dalmas Otieno Nyambuga (Short transitional tenures in 1974)
- Mr. Paul M. Nyambala (1969–1974)
- Mr. Moses Warom (1965–1969).

== Notable alumni ==
- Joe Ageyo, television journalist
- Opiyo Wandayi (born 1972), politician

== Gallery ==
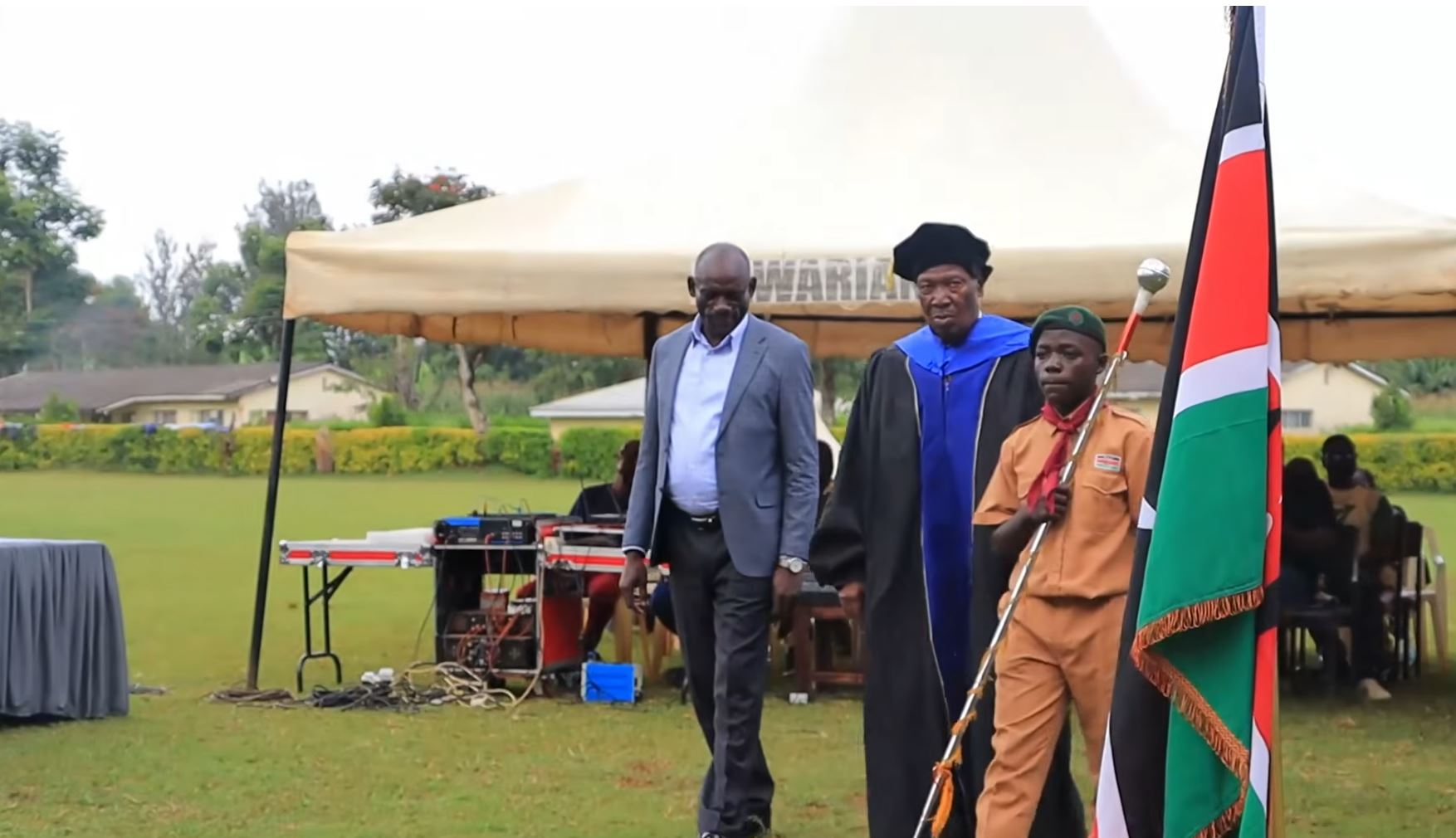
Prof. Ratemo Michieka, accompanied by the Chief Principal Maurice Ogutu, inspecting guard of honor at Sawagongo High School in July 2025

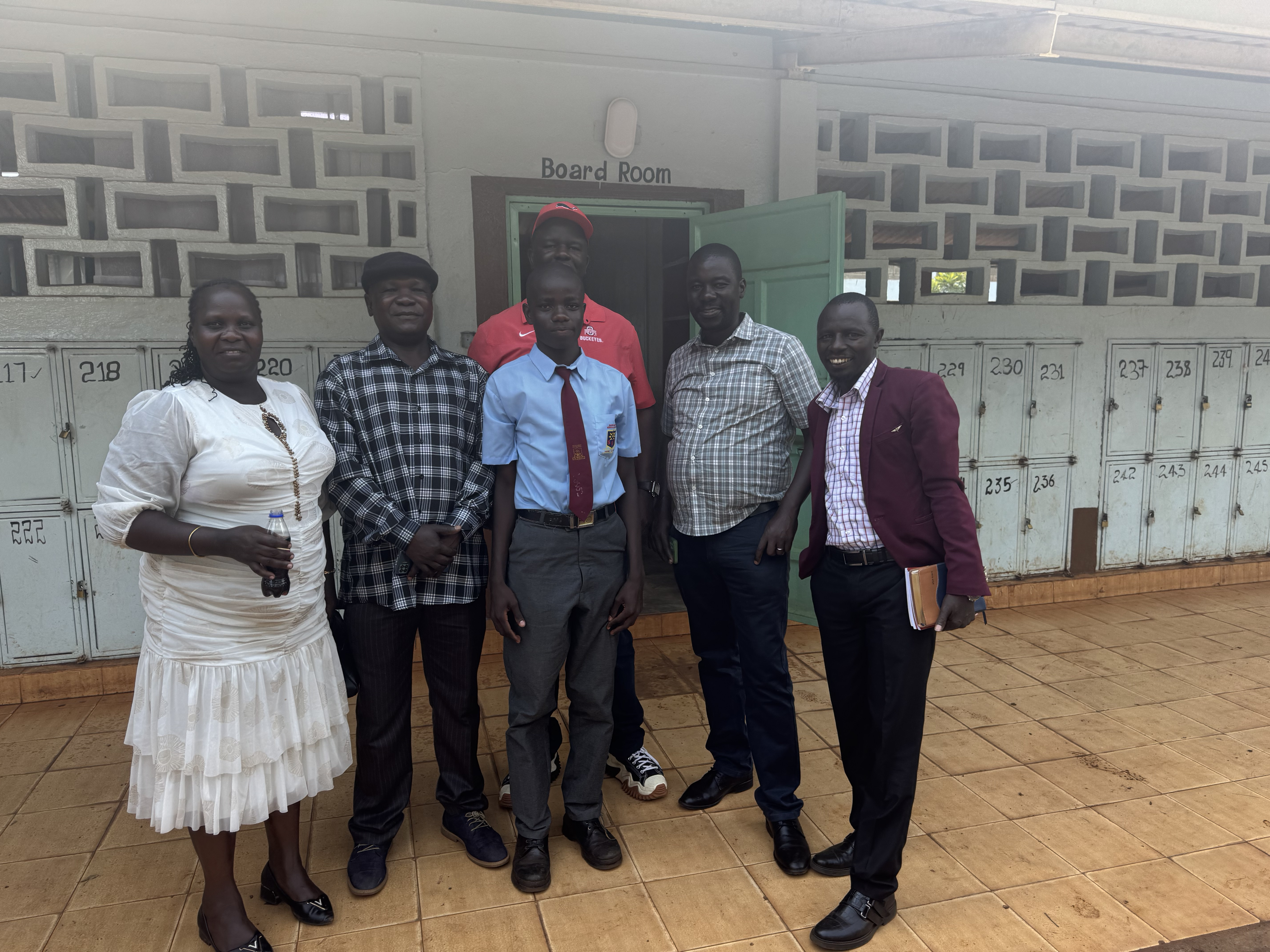
Celebrated motivational speakers Pastor Salina (far left) and Dr. Kilimo (far right) at Sawagongo on June 6th 2026

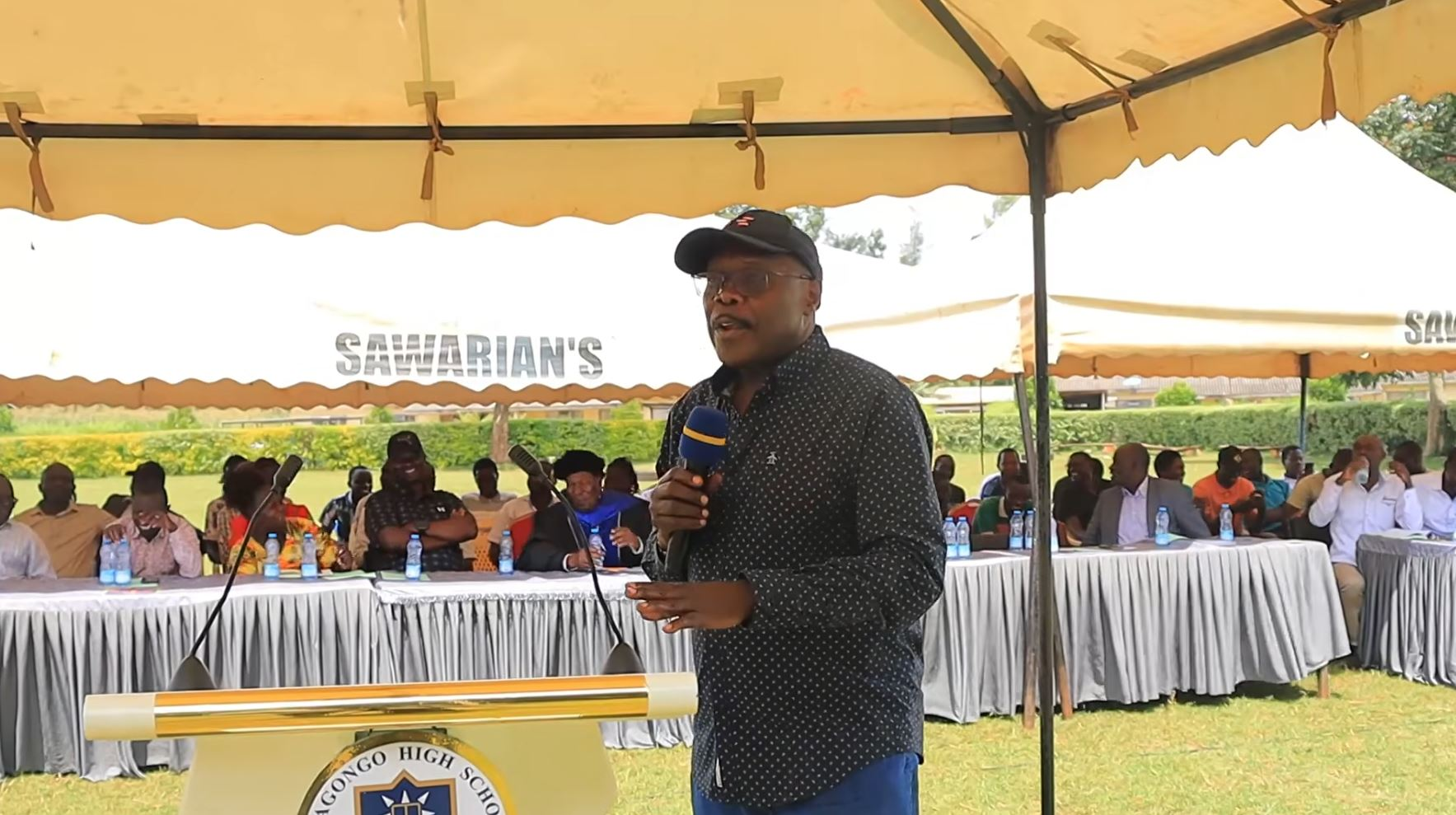
Gor Mahia's Chairman, Lawyer Ambrose Rachier, addressing students at Sawagongo in July 2025

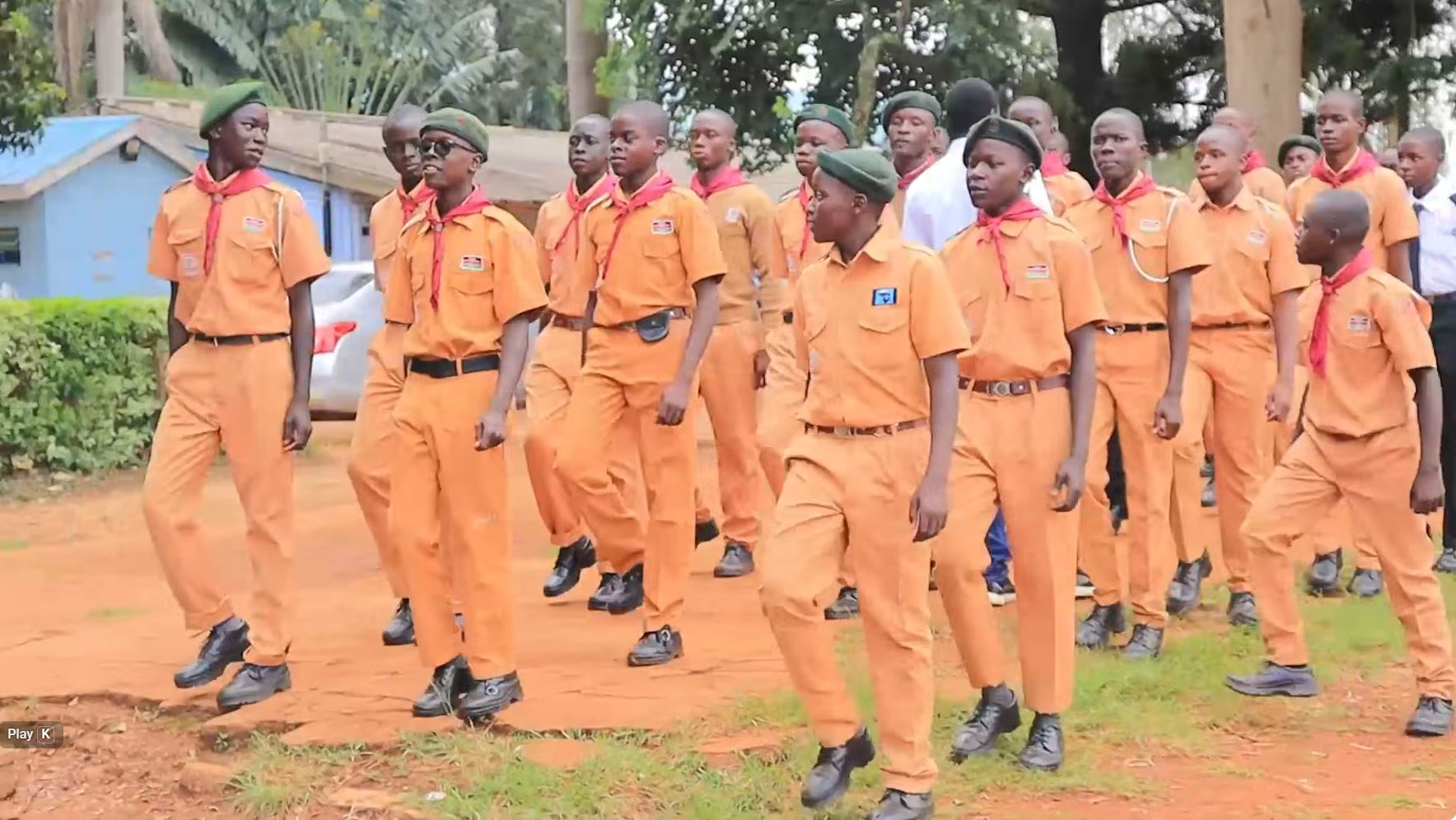
Scouts parade at Sawagongo

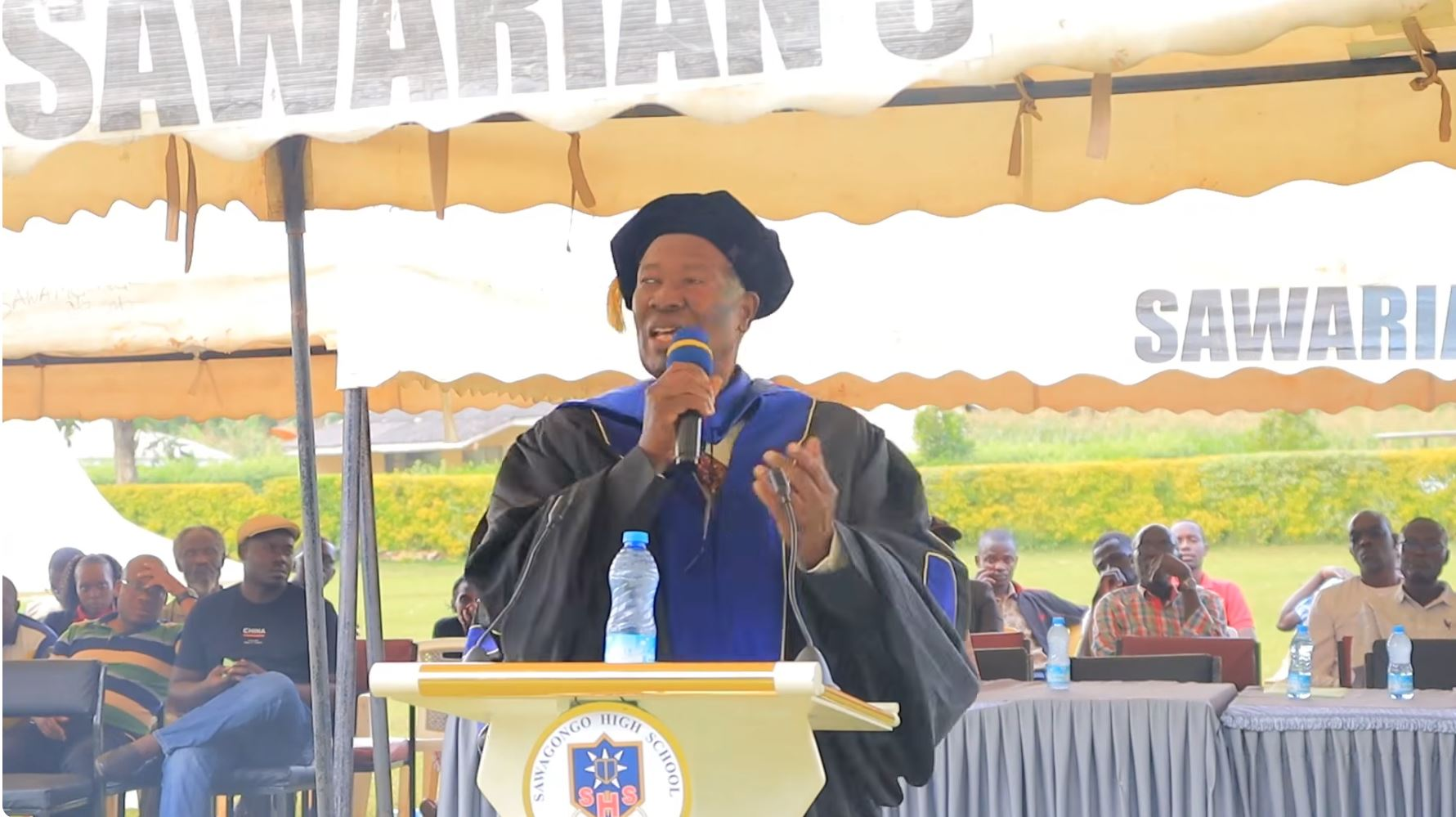
Prof. Ratemo Michieka addressing students at Sawagongo in July 2025

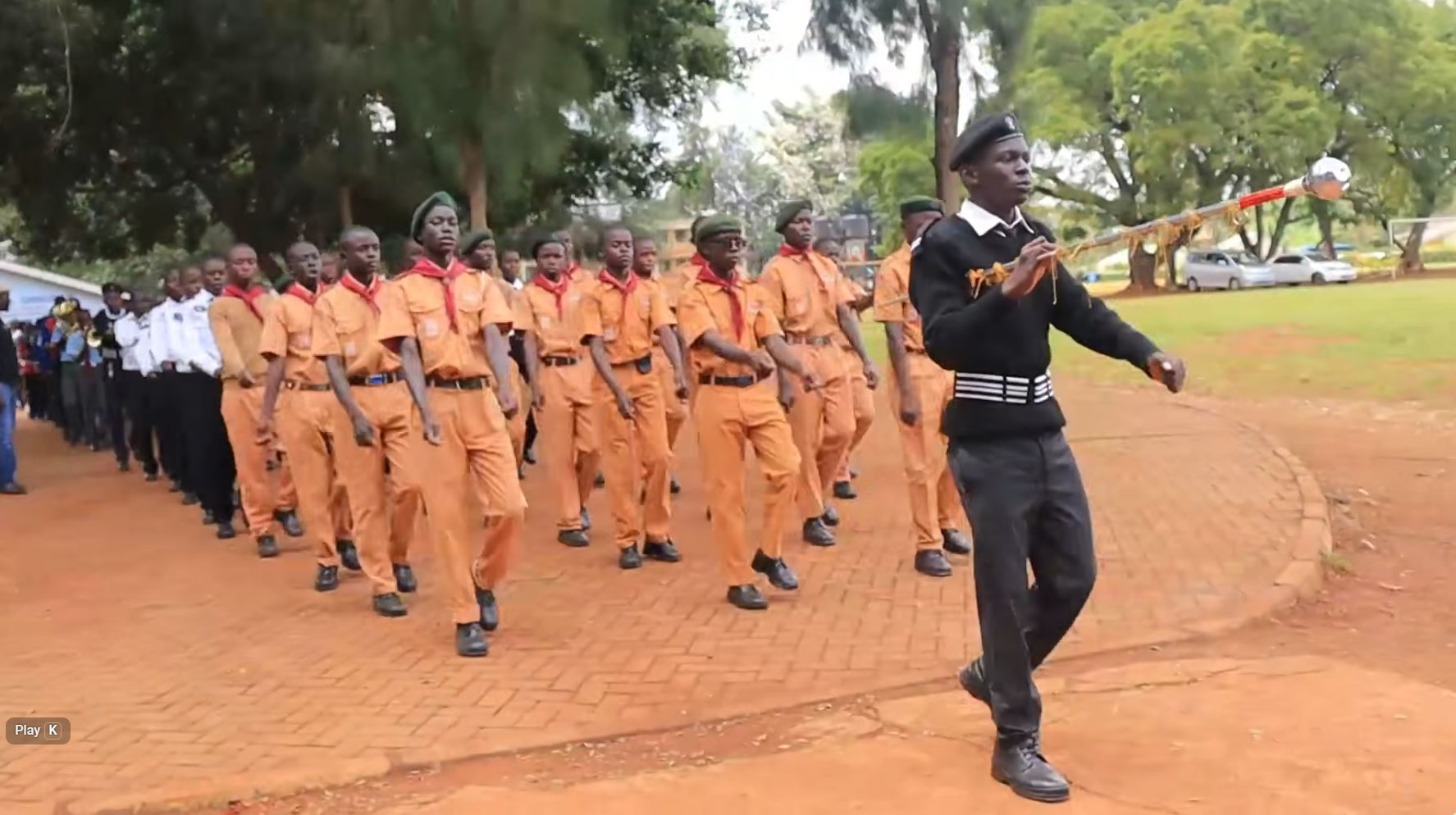
Scouts parade at Sawagongo

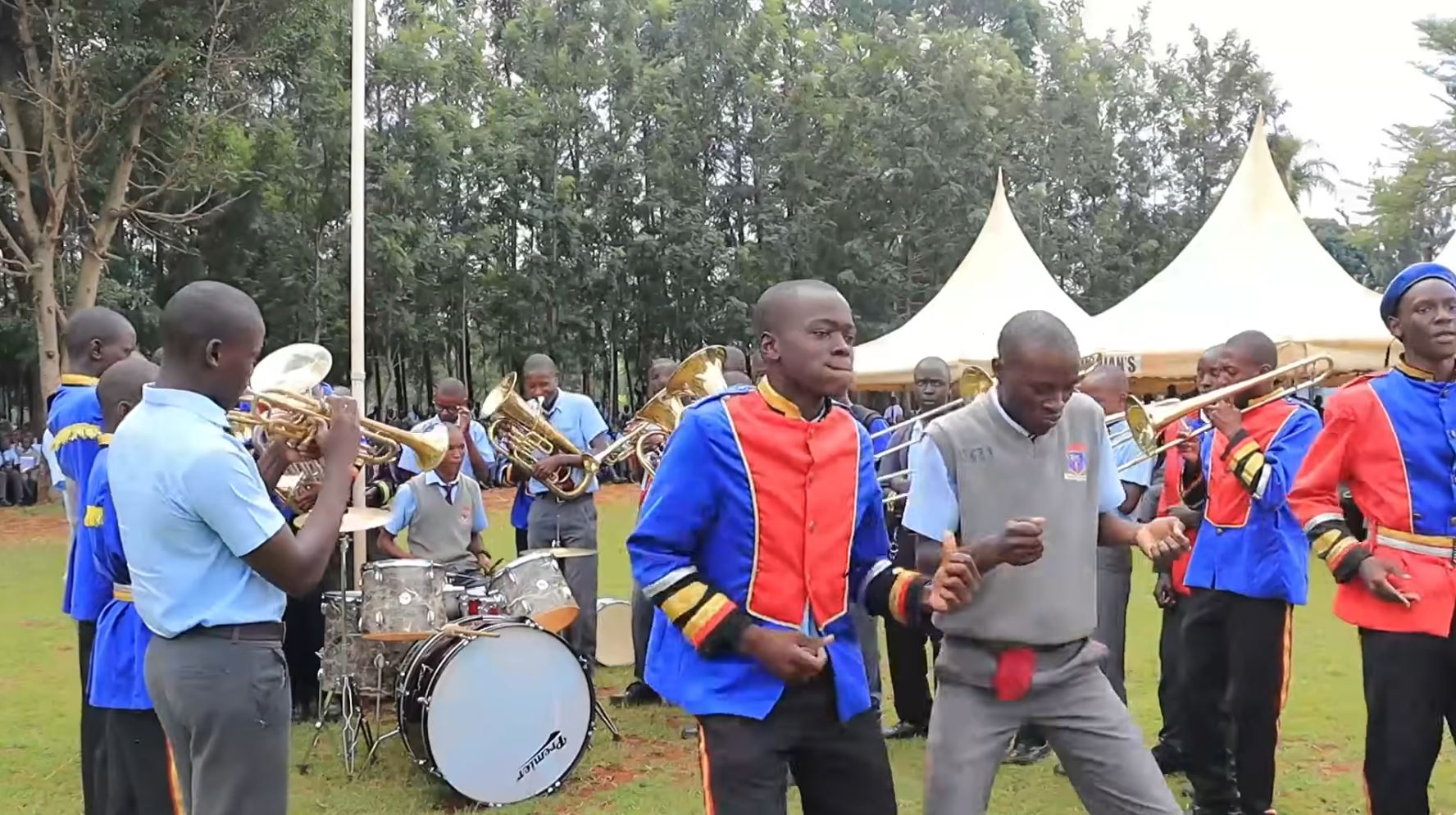
The Sawagongo High School Band

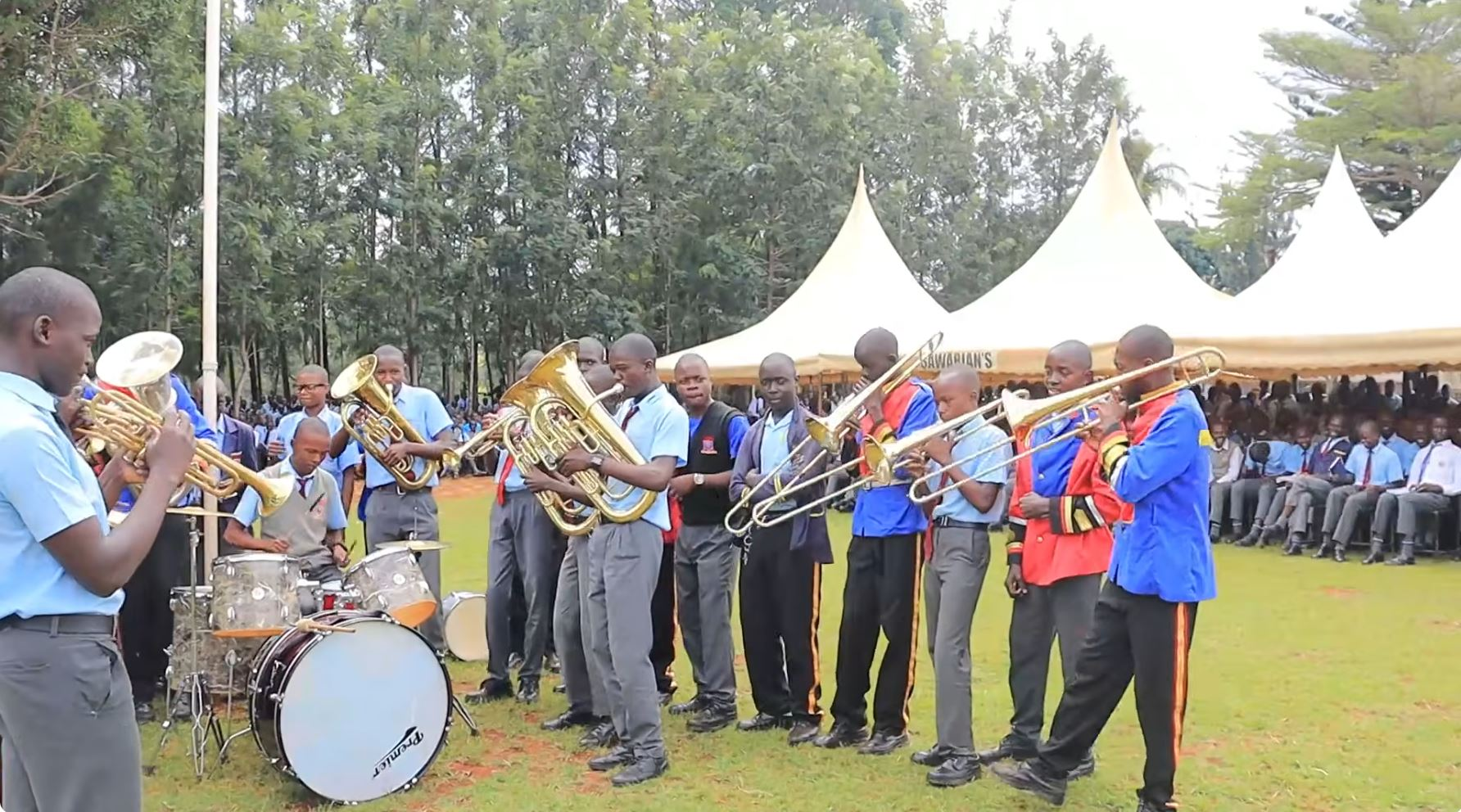
The Sawagongo High School Band

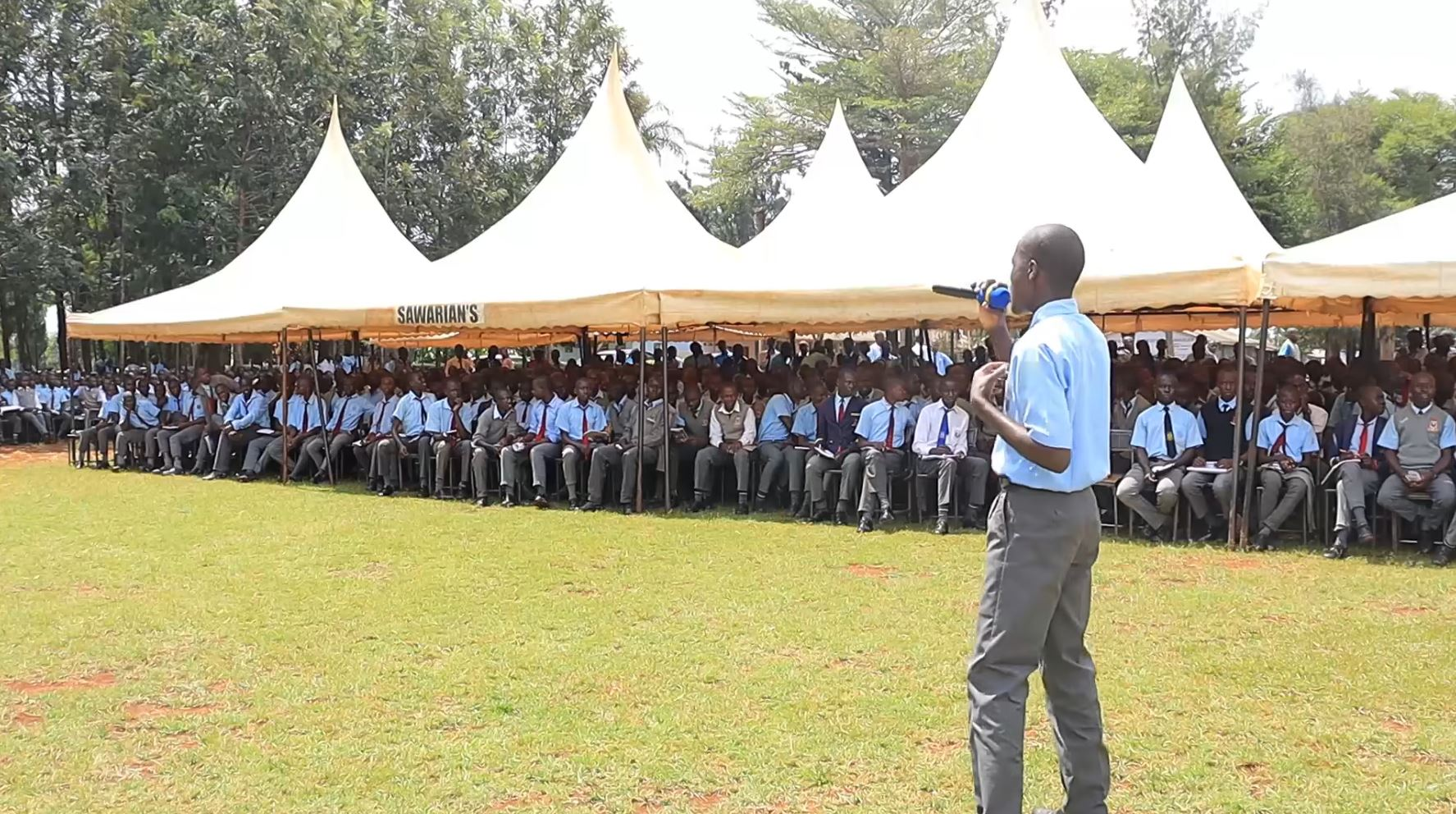
A section of students of Sawagongo High School

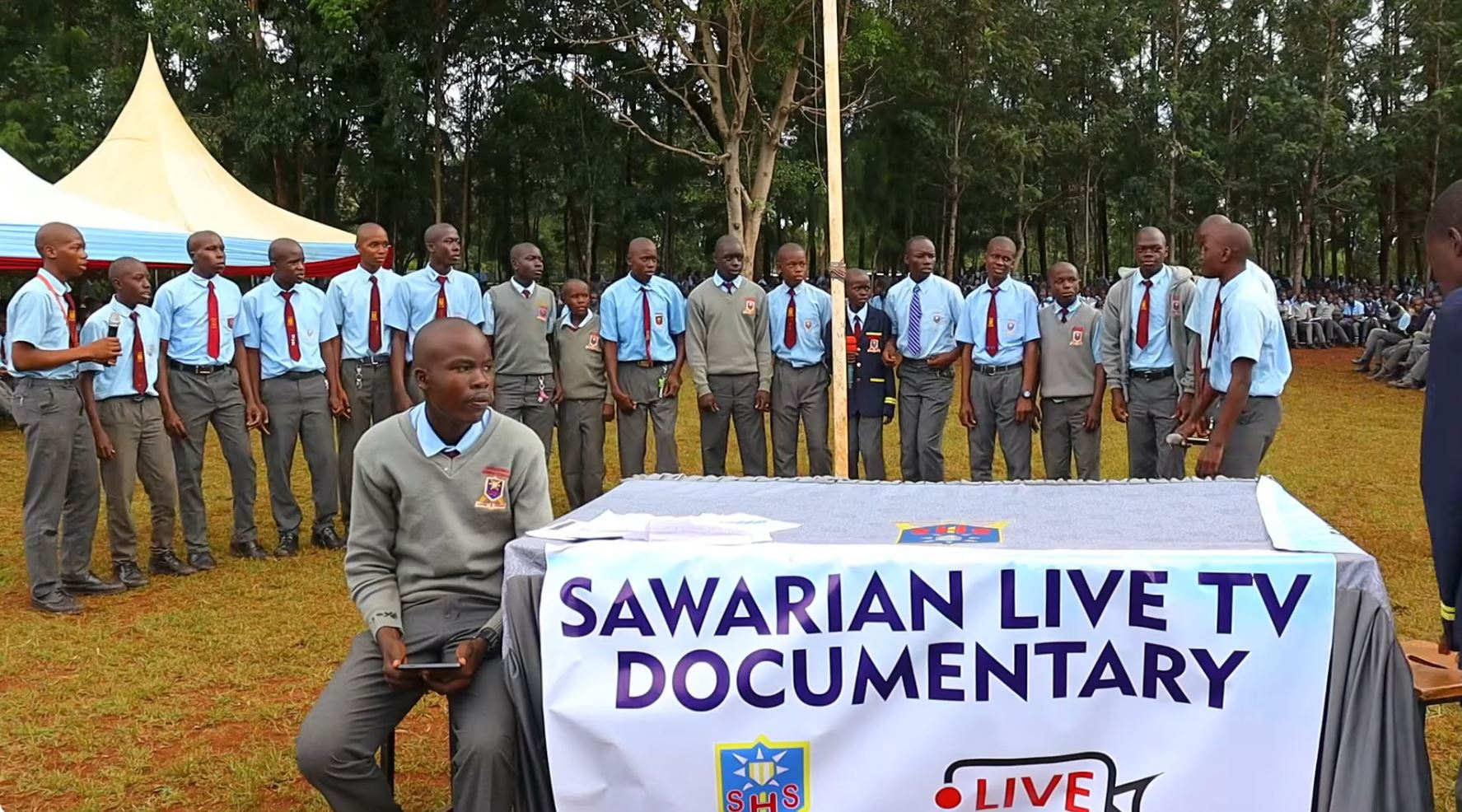
Live Broadcast by the school's Journalism club

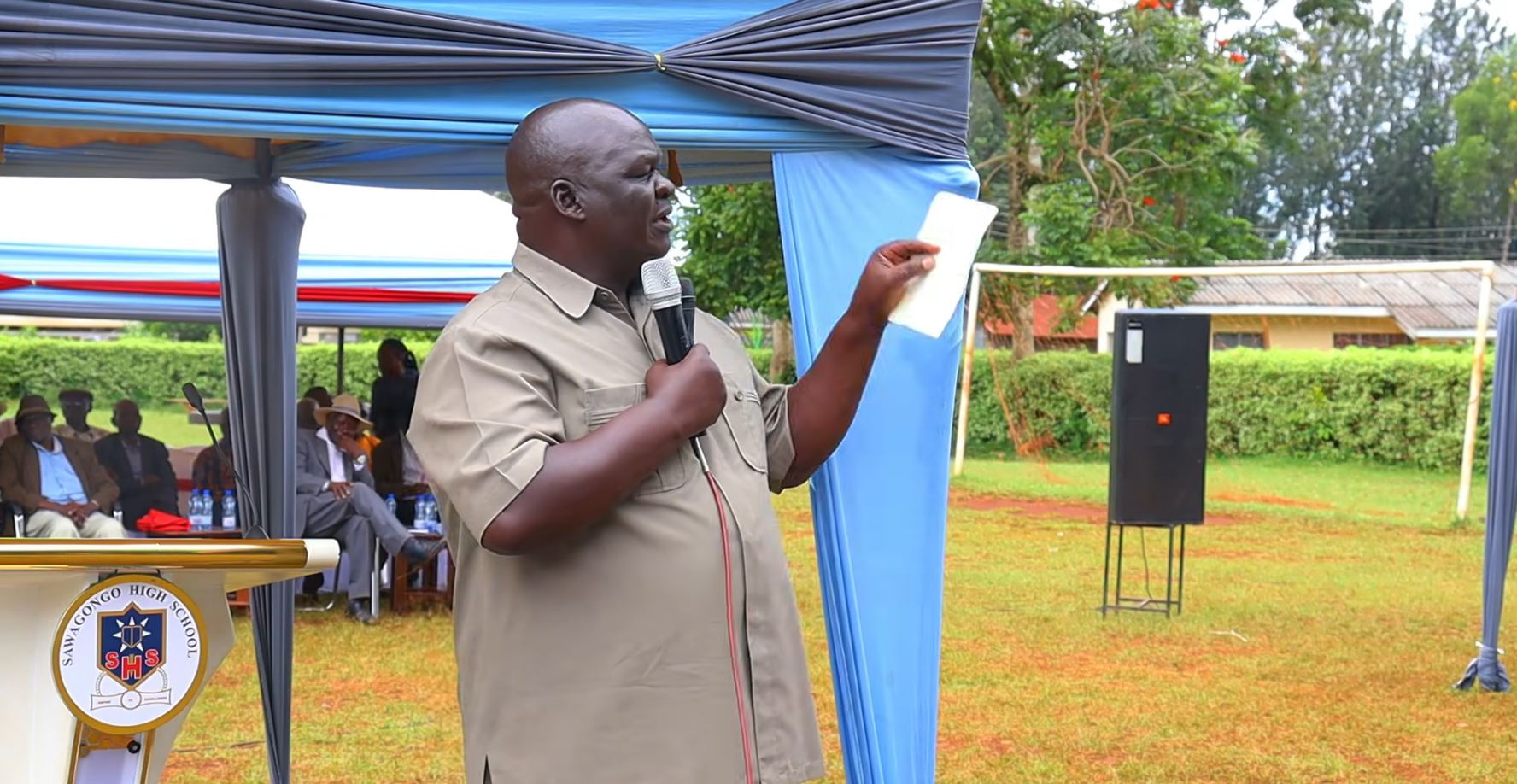
The current head of Sawagongo High School, Senior Principal Henry Airo

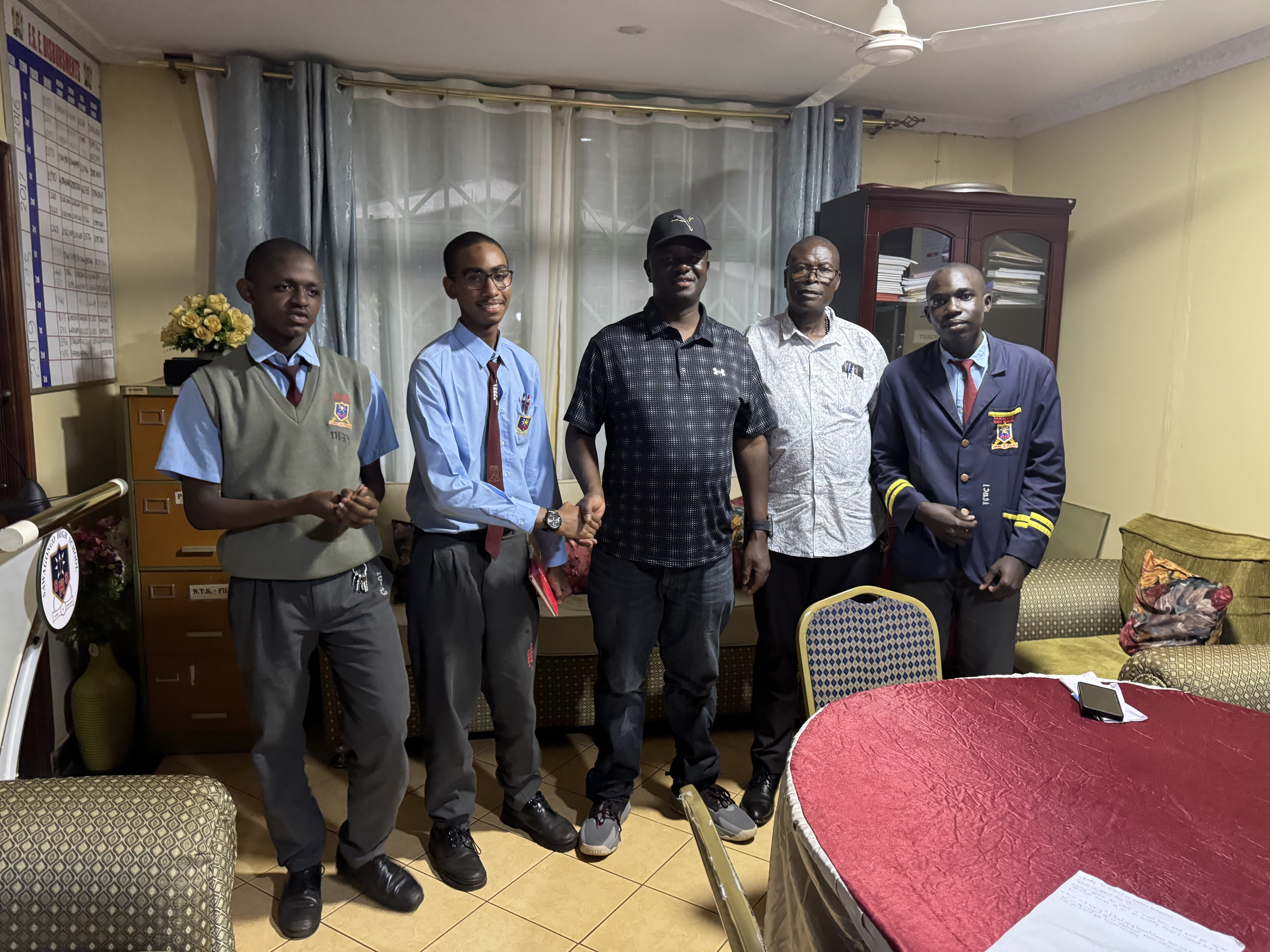
Dr. Fred Odindo (second from right) during his visit at Sawagongo in July 2025. Odindo taught physics at Sawagongo and also served as the games master.

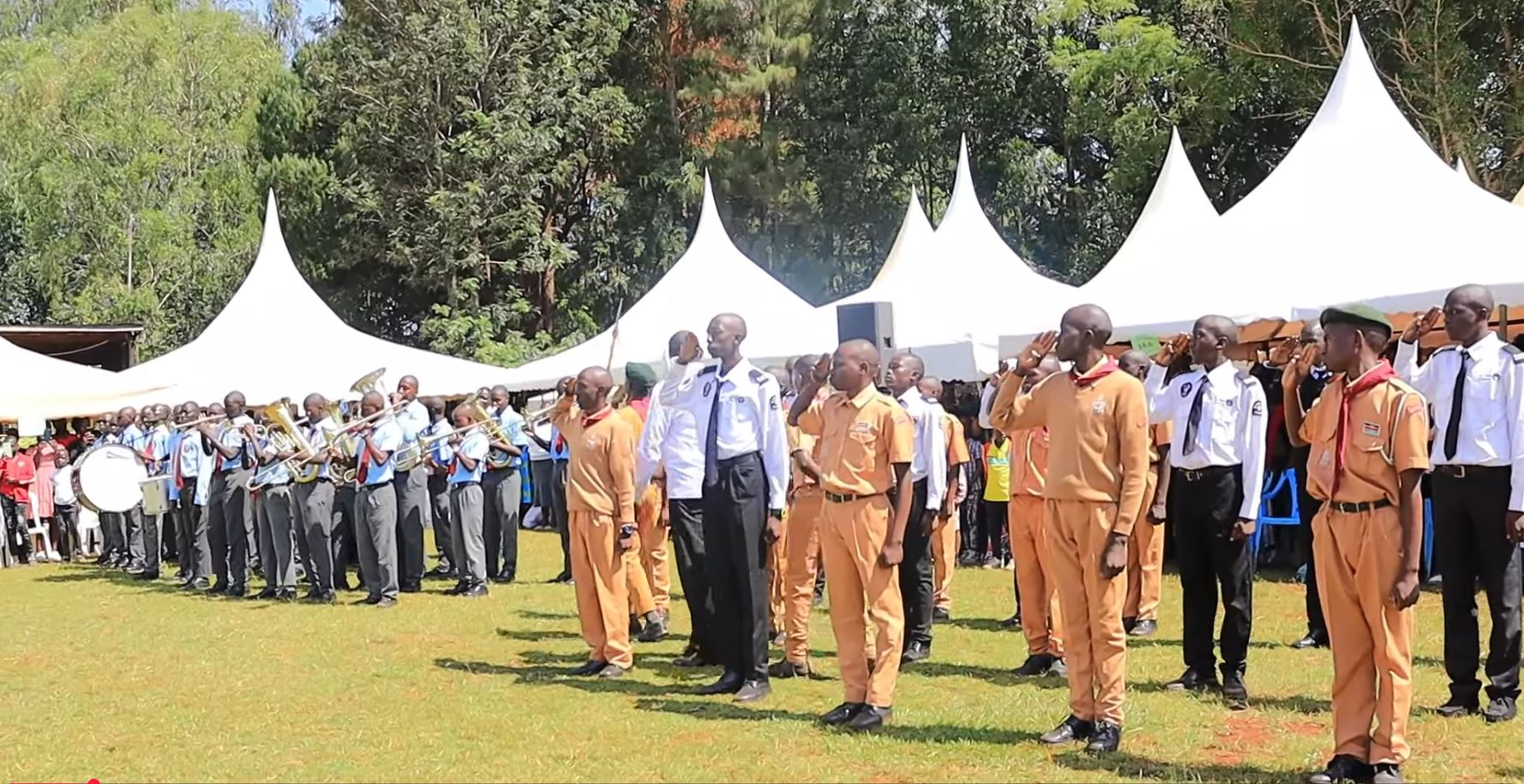
Sawagongo High School's scouts team
