= Timeline of Kenya =

This is a timeline of the History of Kenya comprising important legal and territorial changes as well as political, social, and economic events in Kenya, read more at History of Kenya.

== Pleistocene ==
Year	Date	Event
2.6 - 1.7 MYA		Oldowan industry in Koobi Fora, Kanjera and Mount Homa. These are amongst the earliest hominin tools ever found.
1.2 MYA - 490 kyr		Olorgesailie Aechulean hand axe culture.
320 kyr		Findings at Olorgesailie in Southern Kenya indicate that advanced middle stone age technology and long distance trade was established by this time.
~40 kyr		Ostrich shell bead jewellery and obsidian tools dating to this time are found at Enkapune ya Muto in the Central rift valley. The rock shelter is occupied in phases until 1,300 years ago.
~21 kyr		Dispersal of the common ancestors of East African Hunter gatherers (related to the San people) in the peak of the Last Glacial Maximum.
~10 kyr		An ancient massacre occurs at Nataruk in Turkana County. The remains of 27 men, women and children are found with some showing lesions consistent with blunt and sharp force trauma. These findings call into question the origins of human inter-group conflict.

== 3rd millennium BC ==
Year	Date	Event
3300 BCE - 700 BCE		East African Pastoral neolithic culture spreads. Key features include pastoralism as a means of food production and the construction of stone cairns at burial sites: Savanna Pastoral Neolithic Elmenteitan culture
3000 BCE - 1000 BCE		Cushitic speakers settle across East Africa. Eburran hunter gatherers, who have occupied the area around the Ol Doinyo Eburru volcano complex near Lake Nakuru for nearly 10,000 years, gradually adopt domestic animals.
~3000 BCE		Hyrax Hill in Nakuru is settled by a savanna pastoral neolithic people.
3000 BCE - 2300 BCE		Lothagam North Pillar Site: East Africa's earliest and largest monumental cemetery.
3000 BCE - 2000 BCE		The Kansyore culture becomes East Africa's earliest ceramic producing group of hunter gatherers. This culture was located at Gogo falls in Migori county near Lake Victoria.

== 2nd millennium BC ==
Year	Date	Event
~2000BCE - 1000 AD		The East African Rock art tradition thrives with sites at Mfangano Island, Chelelemuk hills, Namoratunga and Lewa Downs. The rock paintings are attributed to the Twa people, a hunter gatherer group that was once widespread in East Africa

== 1st millennium BC ==
Year	Date	Event
1000BCE - 500BCE		Southern Nilotic speaking communities move southwards from the Sudd into western Kenya.
1000 BCE-1000 AD		Bantu Groups migrate into Kenya bringing with them iron age technology. The Urewe culture, one of Africa's oldest iron smelting centres, settle in the great lakes region including western Kenya. Other groups settle in Southern Kenya

== 1st century BC ==
Year	Date	Event
100BC - 300AD		The earliest settlements in the Swahili coast appear on the archaeological record in Kwale in Kenya, Misasa in Tanzania and Ras Hafun in Somalia. Bantu speaking communities in the great lakes region develop iron forging techniques that enable them to produce carbon steel.

== 1st century AD ==
Year	Date	Event
~1AD - 50AD		The Periplus of the Erythrean Sea, a Graeco-Roman manuscript is written. It describes the East African coast (Azania) and an existing Indian Ocean Trade route.

== 4th century AD ==
Year	Date	Event
300AD - 1000AD		Growth of Azanian and Zanj settlements in the Swahili coast. Local industry and international trade flourish.

== 7th century AD ==
Year	Date	Event
614AD - 900AD		Starting with the first Hijrah (migration) of Prophet Muhammad's followers to Ethiopia, Islam spreads across Eastern, Northern and Western Africa.
630AD - 890AD		Archaeological evidence indicates that crucible steel is manufactured at Galu, south of Mombasa. Metallurgical analysis of iron artefacts indicates that the techniques used by the inhabitants of the Swahili coast combined techniques used in other African sites as well as those in West and South Asian sites.

== 11th century ==
Year	Date	Event
1000 - 1500		Emergence of the Swahili City States. The earliest gravestone found at Gedi Ruins dates to the earlier part of this period. The oldest Swahili texts in existence date to this period. They are written in old Swahili script (Swahili-Arabic alphabet) based on Arabic letters.

== 12th century ==
Year	Date	Event
1100 - 1400		Hyrax Hill in Nakuru is settled by the Sirikwa. Oral histories recall the settlement of Shungwaya found north of the Tana River. Several coastal and central Kenyan Bantu groups are said to have migrated from this settlement due to pressure from Oromo speaking groups.

== 14th century ==
Year	Date	Event
~1331		Moroccan explorer Ibn Battuta visits Mombasa on his way to Kilwa.

== 15th century ==
Year	Date	Event
1418		Chinese Admiral Zheng He visits Malindi. Some of his ships are reported to have sunk near Lamu Island. Recent genetic tests done on local inhabitants confirmed Chinese ancestry
1490-1517		Southern Luo people migrate into Western Kenya from present day Uganda.
1498	April	Vasco da Gama travels to Mombasa and Malindi. Attacks on merchant ships led to a hostile reception in Mombasa. In Malindi the reception was friendlier. He established trade relations, erects a pillar and hires a guide to travel to India.

== 16th century ==
Year	Date	Event
1500-1900		Thimlich Ohinga and other dry-stone walled enclosures in the Lake Victoria Basin are built.
1500-1940		The Kayas - Mijikenda fortified settlements are built then abandoned. Now revered as sacred sites, they are a UNESCO world heritage site.
1505		The Portuguese Empire establishes a presence in Mombasa Most old Swahili texts dating to this period and earlier are destroyed.
1506		Portuguese naval commander Tristão da Cunha is sent to conquer Socotra and establish control of Indian Ocean trade. He leads a blockade of Lamu which capitulates to Portuguese control.
1593		Fort Jesus is built in Mombasa to solidify Portuguese hegemony

== 17th century ==
Year	Date	Event
1698		Omani Arabs capture Fort Jesus and Zanzibar. Arab traders settle in Zanzibar and Pemba. The slave trade grows exponentially with a large slave market based at Zanzibar.

== 18th century ==
Year	Date	Event
1700-1900		Complex water furrows for irrigation are constructed by the Marakwet to facilitate intensive agriculture. Clan owned and communal, these irrigation systems are still in use.
1728		One of the oldest surviving manuscripts in Swahili, an epic poem titled Utenzi wa Tambuka (The story of Tambuka), is written at the Royal Court of Pate Sultanate.

== 19th century ==
Year	Date	Event
1840		Sultan Seyyid Said, ruler of the Omani empire moves his capital to Zanzibar. The growth of clove plantations drives demand for slaves. Slave caravan routes into the interior of Kenya reach as far as the foothills of Mount Kenya, Lake Victoria and past Lake Baringo into Samburu country.
1846	25 August	The first Christian mission is founded by Johann Ludwig Krapf in Rabai. Many freed slaves rescued by the British Navy are settled here.
1850		East and Central Africa is mapped by European explorers.
1874		Frere Town settlement in Mombasa is established. This is another settlement for freed slaves rescued by the British Navy. Despite pressure from the British to stop the East African slave trade, it continues to persist.
1875 - 1884		The peak of the slave plantation economy in East Africa. 43,000 – 47,000 slaves are present on the Kenyan coast (44 percent of the local population)
c1880s		Arab and Swahili traders from the Kenyan coast increasingly establish caravan links with the Wanga Kingdom, trading in ivory and other goods. Nabongo Mumia begins, mantains & manages diplomatic and commercial relations with these traders.
1884 - 1885		The Berlin Conference is convened by Otto Von Bismack. Britain stakes claims in what is today Kenya and Uganda.
c1890s		Arab traders begin fighting alongside Wanga forces against neighbouring communities hostile to the kingdom and participated in slave-raiding expeditions directed against Wanga adversaries
1890		Nabongo Mumia establishes diplomatic relations with Captain Frederick Lugard of the Imperial British East Africa Company (IBEAC), initiating the Wanga Kingdom's alliance with the British by providing safe passage, porters, supplies, and military support for British expeditions, while the British in turn supported Wanga authority and regional security during the establishment of colonial administration in pre-colonial Kenya.
1890 - 1906		The Nandi resistance against colonial rule is led by Koitalel Arap Samoei
1894-1895		Active military and political cooperation of Wanga Kingdom with the British begins in conquering adversary communities of the Wanga
1895-1902		Wanga Kingdom begin leading and assisting in British colonial conquest of western Kenya and neighboring regions.
1895		Following the financial ruin of the Imperial British East African Company which administered the territory that is now Uganda and Kenya, the British Government steps in by proclaiming the Uganda protectorate and the British East African protectorate to maintain its sphere of influence. Significant numbers of South Asians migrate into modern Kenya. Through Indian Ocean trade, there has been an Indian presence on the East African Coast since antiquity.
1898		The Tsavo Man-eaters, two male lions, terrorise workers involved in the construction of the Uganda railway, halting construction for several months. This saga is depicted in the 1996 film, The Ghost and the Darkness

== 20th century ==
Year	Date	Event
1901	22 January	Queen Victoria dies, Edward VII is Kenya's new monarch
1902		The southern areas of the eastern portion of Uganda Protectorate are transferred to East Africa Protectorate Nabongo Mumia declines an invitation to travel to Britain for the coronation of King Edward VII after advice from his fellow Muslim advisers at Mombasa.
1903		The Ugandan Railway is completed
1905		Nairobi is established as the capital of the British East African Protectorate
1909		Slavery is abolished in East Africa Witchcraft is illegal in East Africa Nabongo Mumia is appointed Paramount Chief of Sub-District No. 1 by the colonial administration, with administrative authority under both the East Africa Protectorate and the Uganda Protectorate. The territories placed under his jurisdiction encompass much of the Wanga Kingdom and extended from present-day Naivasha in Kenya to Jinja in present-day Uganda. The appointment over an expansive administrative region consolidates the Wanga Kingdom's position as a leading political, economic, military and administrative centre in Kenya. The appointment recognizes his alliance with the British colonial administration, expands his authority over numerous communities, and further consolidating the Wanga Kingdom as one of as one of the principal African administrative authorities in colonial Kenya.
1911	6 May	Edward VII dies, George V becomes the new monarch
1912 - 1915		Mekatilili Wa Menza leads the Giriama people in a rebellion against colonial authorities.
1914		Kenya participates in the first world war. Approximately 11,000 British and 95,000 Africans were killed in the east African campaign with 45,000 of these Africans coming from Kenya
1920		The British East African Protectorate is transformed to the Kenya Colony Young Kikuyu Association is started by Harry Thuku. Advocating for African suffrage, he was inspired to start a nationalist movement. Thuku renamed his organisation the East African Association, as he was striving for multi-ethnic membership. He included the local Indian community and reached out to other tribes. The colonial government accused Thuku of sedition, arrested him and detained him until 1930. Kikuyu Central Association is formed Led by Joseph Keng'ethe and Jesse Kariuki. Johnstone (later Jomo) Kenyatta was the secretary and editor of the associations' publication Mugwithania (The unifier). Sir Edward Northey becomes the first Kenyan ruler (governor)
1921		The Piny Owacho (Voice of the People) movement in Kavirondo culminates in a large mass meeting advocating for land rights, fairer taxes and fairer treatment by the colonial authorities. Archdeacon W. E. Owen, an Anglican missionary and prominent advocate for African affairs, starts the Kavirondo Taxpayers Welfare Association.
1924		The British Empire cedes part of Jubaland to the Italian Somaliland
1926		The second portion of Uganda Protectorate is transferred to Kenya. This constitutes largely the present-day Turkana County The office of Paramount Chief of Sub-District No. 1 held by Nabongo Mumia is redesignated by the colonial administration as Paramount Chief of North Kavirondo following the reorganization of local administration. North Kavirondo encompasses territories that today form much of Western Kenya
1930		Vittorio Merlo Pick, an Italian missionary, observes and records a traditional Kikuyu poem 150 stanzas long narrated through the use of a memory device and rattle gourd, the Gicandi. Most pre-colonial history in East and Central Africa was recorded orally. The best known memory device from this region still in use is the Lukasa memory board from the Democratic Republic of the Congo.
1935		Makhan Singh pioneers the trade union movement in Kenya by starting Labour trade union of Kenya. He organised the Railway workers strike in 1939 which was heavily suppressed by the colonial government.
1936		George V dies, Edward VIII becomes the colony's new monarch until December 1936 when he abdicated. His younger brother George VI ascends the throne
1939 - 1945		Kenya participates in the second world war. African World war II veterans such as Bildad Kaggia, Fred Kubai and Stanley Mathenge would become central figures in the anti-colonial struggle.
1944		Kenya African Study Union is founded by Harry Thuku
1945-1950		Benga music, a popular genre that originated in Kenya is born. Starting as a blend of Luo traditional string music, Congolese guitar picking styles and Cuban rumba, Benga becomes one of the most popular Kenyan and Pan-African musical genres.
1947		Jomo Kenyatta is new president of Kenya African Union (KAU) Despite Nabongo Mumia's removal as Paramount Chief in 1926,he retains considerable prestige and influence within administrative colonial Kenya; Jomo Kenyatta reportedly approaches him to discuss Kenya's decolonization, but Mumia regards independence as premature and declines to support Kenyatta's position.
1949		Nabongo Mumia dies at about the age of 100, marking the end of the Wanga Kingdom's prominence as a principal African administrative authority in Kenya under British colonial rule. Governor Philip Mitchell attends the funeral. Following Nabongo Mumia's death, the British colonial government declined to recognize a royal successor to the Paramount Chieftainship,effectively dismantling the political institution of the Wanga Kingdom favoring bureaucratic rule over hereditary cheftainship.
1952		George VI dies, Elizabeth II ascends the throne while on a royal tour in Kenya Jomo Kenyatta visits Kisumu in an effort to gain nationwide support for KAU. This visit inspires Oginga Odinga, the Ker (Chief) of the Luo Union, to join KAU. Multiracial pattern of quotas allowed Mau Mau Uprising begins Members of the Forty group, a militant group of World War II veterans including Bildad Kaggia, form part of the core leadership of the uprising.
1952	21 October	The Kapenguria six, core leaders of the Kenya African Union are arrested. They include Jomo Kenyatta, Paul Ngei, Kungu Karumba, Bildad Kaggia, Fred Kubai and Achieng Oneko
1953	8 April	Jomo Kenyatta is jailed
1953 - 1960		Tom Mboya emerges to become a key figure in the anti-colonial struggle. Through the trade union movement (Kenya Federation of Labour), he gains local and international admiration and respect, becoming the first Kenyan to feature on the cover of Time magazine.
1956	21 October	Dedan Kimathi, a key leader of the Mau Mau uprising is captured. This effectively event marks the defeat of the Mau Mau.
1957		The first election for African members of the legislative council (MLC) is held. Oginga Odinga and Tom Mboya are elected. Daniel arap Moi is the only previously nominated MLC who gets elected.
1958	25 June	Oginga Odinga calls for the release of Jomo Kenyatta at a Legislative council debate. He endures months of persecution for taking this stand. It then becomes the rallying call for the African nationalist movement.
1959 - 1963		The Kennedy Airlift scholarship program is started by Tom Mboya and William X Scheinman to address the shortfall of skilled African labour in soon to be independent Kenya. Nobel Prize winner Wangarĩ Maathai, Barack Obama Sr. and George Saitoti are amongst the beneficiaries of these airlifts. The program lasts until 1963. Over 800 students from East Africa benefit from this program.
1959	6 March	The colonial government attempts to crush Tom Mboya's Nairobi People's Convention Party. This is the most organised and effective political party in Kenya at a time when national African parties are banned. Mboya's home is raided by the police and over 40 party members are arrested and sent to their tribal homes. This is the biggest round up since the Mau Mau emergency.
1959	May	Tom Mboya is honoured by Martin Luther King and the Southern Christian Leadership Conference (SCLC). Martin Luther King affirms the connection between the American civil rights movement and the African Liberation Movement. Tom Mboya and Martin Luther King share a podium at a civil rights rally held in Washington DC.
1960		The Nairobi People's Convention Party merges with the Kenya Independence Movement and Kenya African Union to form the Kenya African National Union (KANU) Mau Mau Uprising ends
1960 - 1963		The Lancaster House Conferences are held in London to discuss Kenya's independence and constitutional framework. Thurgood Marshall, American Lawyer and civil rights activist, is consulted by Mboya and Odinga to help draft the first constitution.
1960 - 1989		Kenya and the Cold War. The pan-continental wave of African nationalism attracts Cold War interests. For Kenya, this peaks between 1963 and 1969 when a proxy cold war plays out in local politics.
1961	21 August	Jomo Kenyatta is released
1961	September	Bildad Kaggia is released from prison.
1962		KANU–KADU coalition government is formed
1963 - 1967		The Shifta War. This was a war of Secession between the Northern Frontier District Liberation Movement and Kenyan government.
1963	12 December	Kenya becomes a sovereign state but remains a member of the commonwealth realm Jomo Kenyatta becomes Kenya's first Prime Minister and head of government serving Elizabeth II Malcolm MacDonald becomes Kenya's last Colonial governor
1964		UNESCO's General History of Africa is launched aiming to tackle ignorance of Africa's history. Kenyan historian Bethwell Allan Ogot plays a key role in its production.
1964	20 October	Malcolm X attends the Kenyatta Day parade in Nairobi. The American Civil rights leader first visited Kenya in 1959. Earlier in the year, Malcolm X attended the OAU meeting in Cairo to convince African states to raise the question of persecution of African Americans at the United Nations.
1964	12 December	Kenya becomes a republic with Jomo Kenyatta as the first President of Kenya
1965	28 January	The Kenyatta government sends the Kenya Army to Meru district, where Mau Mau fighters are gathered under the leadership of Field Marshall Mwariama and Field Marshall Baimungi. These last Mau Mau leaders had been insisting that they should get land and be absorbed into the civil service and Kenya Army. Both leaders and several Mau Mau fighters are killed
1965	24 February	Anti-colonial activist and socialist politician, Pio Gama Pinto is assassinated. This is independent Kenya's first political assassination.
1966		Bildad Kaggia and Oginga Odinga accuse the Kenyatta government of pursuing corrupt land distribution policies that did not favour the poor and the landless. Kenya's vice president, Oginga Odinga, leaves the ruling party KANU and starts a left leaning party, the Kenya People's Union. 29 members of parliament including Kaggia defect from KANU to KPU.
1966	11 and 12 June	The 'Little general election' is held. These by-elections are called following the defection of 29 members of KANU to establish the Kenya People's Union. Outside Nyanza Province, most KPU candidates, including Bildad Kaggia, lose in this election.
1966	July	A security Act is passed in Parliament that permits the government to carry out detention without trial. This act is used against KPU members who are arrested in round up a few weeks later. Those arrested include Ochola Mak'Anyengo (Secretary-General of the Kenya Petroleum Oil Workers Union), Oluande Koduol (Oginga Odinga's private secretary) and Peter Ooko (Secretary general of the East African Common Services Civil Servants Union)
1967		East African Community formed Kenyan pro-divisions founded
1968		Richard Leakey leads a preliminary search of Koobi Fora. This archaeological site yields a wealth of stone tools and hominin fossils that shape the understanding of human evolution and development. Naftali Temu wins the 10,000 metres race at the 1968 Summer Olympics in Mexico City becoming Kenya's first gold medalist.
1969	5 July	Tom Mboya, widely considered as heir apparent to Kenyatta, is assassinated.
1969	25 October	The Kisumu massacre occurs. Two days later, all KPU leaders are arrested and detained without trial and KPU is banned. Oginga Odinga is placed under house arrest. Kenya becomes a de facto one party state.
1970		The International Centre of Insect Physiology and Ecology (ICIPE) is started by Kenyan entomologist, Thomas Odhiambo. Through the years he becomes known for his research on Insect physiology and non-chemical methods of agricultural insect control
1971		Oginga Odinga is released from house arrest
1972	5 June	United Nations Environmental Program is founded with its headquarters in Nairobi. Kenyan scientist Reuben Olembo plays a key role in starting it and becomes the deputy executive director. He later becomes the assistant UN secretary general (1994-1998).
1973		The Lokiriama Peace Accord is signed by Turkana people and Matheniki of Uganda Lufthansa Flight 540 crashes
1974	14 October	General elections are held in Kenya. Former KPU members including Odinga are prevented from running for office.
1975	March	Josiah Mwangi Kariuki, a popular left leaning politician and gadfly critical of the Kenyatta government is assassinated.
1977		Ngũgĩ wa Thiong'o, renowned Kenyan writer is detained without trial. His play Ngaahika Ndeenda (I Will Marry When I Want) provokes government authorities to arrest him. Continuous harassment after his release in 1978 forces him into exile from 1982 until 2002. East Africa's first woman to receive a PhD, Wangarĩ Maathai starts the Green Belt Movement. This organisation aims to mobilise the community to conserve the environment and reduce poverty. Rhamu incident occurs
1978		Jomo Kenyatta dies Daniel arap Moi becomes new Kenyan President
1980		Garissa massacre takes place
1982		Oginga Odinga attempts to start a new political party. Section 2a of the Kenyan constitution is amended making Kenya a de jure one party state therefore preventing his efforts. A coup attempt by Kenya Air Force soldiers in August, led by Hezekiah Ochuka is foiled. Oginga Odinga is expelled from KANU and imprisoned for several months. The General Service Unit is formed
1984		The first case of HIV is recorded in Kenya. Despite evidence to the contrary prominent leaders are initially in denial of the extent of HIV in Kenya. By 1994, the Ministry of Health would estimate that 200,000 people died of AIDS Wagalla massacre occurs, committed by Kenyan troops
1986		Documentary series The Africans: A Triple Heritage premiers on the BBC and PBS in the United States. The series is produced by one of Africa's most prominent public intellectuals, Prof. Ali Mazrui. He was born in Mombasa; a member of the prominent Mazrui family.
1987		Barack Obama visits Kenya for the first time to meet his father's family. Kenya hosts the All African Games
1990	13 February	The body of Robert Ouko, the Kenyan Foreign Minister, is found. Initial police reports stated that his death was a suicide but forensic evidence suggests that he was murdered. Public pressure forces President Daniel arap Moi to involve Scotland Yard in the investigation.
1990	July	The Saba Saba protests – pro-democracy uprisings – engulf the country. Kenneth Matiba and Raila Odinga are amongst the many opposition leaders arrested and detained without trial. Nelson Mandela visits Kenya with the intention of visiting the grave of Dedan Kimathi. His request is turned down by government authorities. Dedan Kimathi was buried in an unmarked grave in Kamiti Maximum Prison after his execution in 1957. His grave site would not be identified until 2019.
1991		Local and International Pressure mounts leading to the repealing of section 2a of the constitution. Kenya becomes a multiparty state. The Forum for Restoration of Democracy (FORD), an opposition political party led by Oginga Odinga, Kenneth Matiba and Martin Shikuku is formed.
1992	August	The Forum for Restoration of Democracy (FORD) splits up following internal wrangling into FORD-Asili, FORD-Kenya and FORD-People.
1992	29 December	The 1992 Kenyan general elections are held. This is Kenya's first presidential multiparty election. This election is marred by irregularities and targeted ethnic violence in Rift Valley Province. President Daniel arap Moi retains his seat.
1994	20 January	Oginga Odinga dies.
1996		Professor Leah T. Marangu is appointed as the Vice Chancellor of Africa Nazarene University (ANU). She becomes the first Kenyan woman to head a University
1997	January	Kenyan hip hop group Kalamashaka release the hit song "Tafsiri Hii" produced by Tedd Josiah. Their modern hip hop style combined with Swahili lyrics to give a message of hope despite the social and political issues bedevilling Kenya inspires a generation of urban youth and local talent.
1997	7 July	The Saba Saba anniversary confrontation leaves 10 people dead and several injured at the hands of government authorities. The run-up to the 1997 election is marred by violence against the opposition
1997	29 December	President Daniel arap Moi is elected again in Kenya's second presidential multiparty election. These elections attract widespread criticism over irregularities and ethnic clashes. Mwai Kibaki and Raila Odinga (Oginga Odinga's son) are his main challengers.
1998	7 August	The US Embassy bombings in Nairobi, Kenya's capital and Dar es Salaam in Tanzania leave 224 people dead and over 4000 people injured. Al-Qaeda and the Egyptian Islamic Jihad are implicated.
2000		President Daniel arap Moi sets up the Constitution of Kenya Review Commission. Yash Pal Ghai is installed as the chairman. This is Kenya's first major constitutional reform since independence.

== 21st century ==
Year	Date	Event
2002		Kenyan author Binyavanga Wainaina wins the 2002 Caine Prize for his short story "Discovering Home". Shortly afterwards he starts the literary magazine, Kwani?(So what?) which launches the careers of several writers including Yvonne Adhiambo Owuor (winner of the 2003 Caine Prize) and Uwem Akpan (Nigerian author, winner of the Commonwealth Writers' Prize).
2002	28 November	The 2002 Mombasa attacks occur. Paradise Hotel and an Arkia airline owned flight are attacked. Both are Israeli owned. The attack on the airline fails but 13 people are killed and 80 are injured at the hotel.
2002	27 December	The 2002 general election is held. 62% of voters reject KANU's presidential candidate, Uhuru Kenyatta (Jomo Kenyatta's son), voting in the National Rainbow Coalition (NARC) into power. Mwai Kibaki becomes President of Kenya. Daniel arap Moi, the longest serving president in Kenya's history, steps down from power.
2003	14 September	Dr. Crispin Mbai, the head of a key and contentious committee in Kenya's constitutional reforms is murdered. Many perceive this as a political murder
2004	8 October	Wangarĩ Maathai becomes the first African woman and first environmentalist to win the Nobel Peace Prize.
2005	7 February	John Githongo, journalist and whistle-blower, resigns from his position as Permanent Secretary for Governance and Ethics. He later names top politicians involved in the Anglo-leasing scandal, a government procurement scam. Following threats to his life he moves to the UK in exile.
2005	September	Kimani Maruge, the oldest elementary school student in the Guinness book of World Records, addresses the 2005 United Nations world summit in New York City on the importance of free primary education. A former Mau Mau fighter, he took the opportunity to enrol in primary school after Kenya started free primary education in 2003. His story was told in the 2010 biographical film, The First Grader.
2005	21 November	The 2005 Kenyan constitutional referendum is held. Widely perceived as a referendum against President Mwai Kibaki, 57% of voters reject the draft constitution. Two days later, Kibaki dismisses his entire cabinet.
2006		The Murumbi gallery opens at the Kenya National Archives. Joseph Murumbi, former Kenyan Vice President, was one of the worlds foremost collectors of African artefacts and historical documents. He sold his collection to the Kenyan government in 1977.
2007		Prof. Miriam Were, a prominent public health expert and HIV/AIDS researcher, receives the Queen Elizabeth II Gold Medal for Outstanding contributions to International Public Health and Supporting the Health Needs of Disadvantaged people. Despite downward trends in the national prevalence of HIV in Kenya, in 2007, approximately 1,400,000 persons are living with HIV.
2007	March	Safaricom and Vodafone launch M-Pesa, a mobile phone based money transfer system, following successful trials in Thika in 2006. By 2019, this service will have 42 million active customers over 7 countries. Millions of people with limited access to banking services, through their mobile phones, gain access to financial services.
2007	27 December	The 2007 general elections are held. The campaign and election period are heavily polarised along ethnic lines. The results are contested by the Orange Democratic Movement, led by Raila Odinga as the Party of National Unity led by Mwai Kibaki is declared victorious. The post-election crisis of 2007–2008 begins shortly after the election. At least 1,133 people are killed and more than 600,000 are displaced
2008	6 November	President Kibaki declares this day a public holiday following the election of Barack Obama to become the first African American president of the United States.
2009		the UN Secretary general Kofi Annan handed names of the main suspects of the 2007 Post-election violence to the International Criminal Court
2010	March	Entrepreneur and blogger Erik Hersman starts iHub, an innovation hub and hacker space. This quickly becomes a central pillar of the Silicon Savannah (the Kenyan tech scene). Between 2010 and 2019, 170 companies are formed out of iHub.
2010	March	The Kenyan music group Just a Band releases Kenya's first viral music video – Ha He – which tells the exploits of Makmende, referencing blaxploitation and kung fu motifs. The viral response highlights the uptake and penetration of technology and social media in Kenya
2010	4 August	Kenya holds a constitutional referendum. 68.6% of voters approve the new constitution
2010	December	Six prominent Kenyans are accused of crimes against humanity by the prosecutor of the International Criminal Court in The Hague, Luis Moreno Ocampo. Education Minister William Ruto, Finance Minister Uhuru Kenyatta, Industrialization Minister Henry Kosgey, secretary to the cabinet Francis Kirimi Muthaura, former police chief Mohammed Hussein Ali and radio executive Joshua Arap Sang
2012	January 23	The Pre-trial chamber of the ICC confirms charges against Kenyatta, Muthaura, Ruto and Sang.
2012		First LGBT pride event held in Kenyan US embassy George Saitoti and Orwa Ojode are killed in a helicopter crash
2012	March	Anglo-Irish firm, Tullow Oil, discovers oil in Northern Kenya. President Kibaki calls the find a major breakthrough
2012	9 August	In what was dubbed "The Greatest 800 Meter Race Ever", David Rudisha wins the gold medal in the 2012 London olympics 800m race and breaks the world record.
2013	September	The Westgate terror attack. Four gunmen kill over 60 people and injure approximately 200 in an attack on an upscale mall, Westgate shopping mall. Al-Shabaab claim responsibility for the attack in retaliation for Kenya's incursion into Somalia in 2011 - Operation Linda Nchi.
2013		Uhuru Kenyatta is voted in as the fourth President of Kenya with William Ruto as his deputy president following the 2013 Kenyan General Elections
2014	2 March	Lupita Nyong'o wins the Academy Award for Best Supporting Actress at the 86th Academy Awards for her role in 12 Years a Slave. She becomes the first African to win an Oscar.
2014	October	Kenya rebases its economy increasing in GDP size by 25.3 per cent. Newly classified as a middle-income country, Kenya becomes Africa's ninth largest economy, up from 12th.
2014	December	The prosecutor of the International Criminal Court in The Hague, Fatou Bensouda withdraws charges against President Kenyatta due to lack of evidence.
2015	2 April	The Garissa University College attack occurs. Gunmen claiming to be from Al-Shabaab kill 148 people and injure over 70. This is the second most deadly terrorist attack on Kenyan soil.
2015	28 June	Business Insider features Mubarak Muyika, Kenyan technology entrepreneur and founder of Zagace, among its global list of Top young entrepreneurs around the world dubbed the "Mark Zuckerbergs" of their respective countries. Later that year, Forbes Africa names him to its 30 Under 30 list, reflecting the growing international recognition of Kenya's technology sector.
2016	April	The International Criminal Court drops its case against the deputy president of Kenya, William Ruto A Huruma building in Nairobi collapses. 52 people are killed and several injured. The high demand for Housing in Nairobi leads to some developers bypassing safety regulations. The Kenya rugby sevens team beats Fiji to win their first Sevens World Series title
2016	September	Mark Zuckerberg visits iHub
2017	8 August	The 2017 Kenyan general elections are held. Nine days prior to the election, Chris Msando, the head of IT at the Independent Electoral and Boundaries Commission is found murdered. The election is highly contested with allegations of rigging. The incumbent, Jubilee Party candidate Uhuru Kenyatta, is declared winner but the results are challenged in the Supreme Court by Raila Odinga, leader of the Orange Democratic Movement Afterwards, protests erupt in Nairobi, Western Kenya and the Coastal region. The police response is lethal. Over the next weeks after the election, at least 12 people are killed and over a hundred injured. Police operations include door to door crackdowns in areas not involved in the protests. The tragic death of 6 month old Samantha Pendo ignites an uproar over police brutality.
2017	20 September	The Supreme Court annuls the election results. Fresh elections are called for within 60 days.
2017	26 October	The second 2017 presidential election is held. Raila Odinga refuses to participate in these elections citing uncorrected issues within the Independent Electoral and Boundaries Commission. Kenyatta is declared winner with 98% of the vote with a voter turn-out of 39%.
2018	30 January	Amidst a media black-out, Raila Odinga is sworn in as the "People's President" in an effort to persuade Uhuru Kenyatta to come to the negotiation table. Kenyan lawyer Miguna Miguna officiates the ceremony. He is deported in February following treason related charges and the legality of his citizenship is brought to question.
2018	March	An investigative report reveals that Cambridge Analytica, a data analytics firm, played a critical role in President Uhuru Kenyatta's two campaigns, in 2013 and 2017. After months of political uncertainty, Uhuru Kenyatta and Raila Odinga make peace with "the Handshake". Raila Odinga is later appointed as the African Union's High representative for Infrastructural Development.
2018	May	Wanuri Kahiu's film, Rafiki, receives a standing ovation at the 2018 Cannes Film Festival. The Kenya Film Classification Board bans this film for its subject matter. This is the first Kenyan film to screen at the Cannes Film Festival
2019	15-16 January	The DusitD2 complex which hosts an upscale hotel and several other offices is attacked. 21 people are killed and several injured. Al-Shabaab claims responsibility for the attack stating that it was a response to US President Donald Trump's decision to recognise Jerusalem as the capital of Israel
2019	23 March	Kenyan science teacher and Franciscan Friar, Peter Tabichi, wins the Global Teacher Prize.
2019	October	US-based Kenyan scientist and inventor, Prof. Benson Edagwa is named the Emerging Innovator of the year at the University of Nebraska Medical Center for his work on developing long acting Antiretroviral treatments for HIV.
2020	13 March	Kenya confirms first COVID-19 infection.
2022	9 August	The 2022 Kenyan general elections are held in which William Ruto was elected as the 5th president of Kenya with Rigathi Gachagua as the deputy president.

== See also ==
- Timelines of cities in Kenya: Mombasa, Nairobi

== Bibliography ==
- Institut für Afrika-Kunde; Rolf Hofmeier, eds. (1990). "Kenya". Afrika Jahrbuch 1989 (in German). Germany: Leske + Budrich. doi:10.1007/978-3-322-92639-5. ISBN 978-3-8100-0831-2. OCLC 19093344. "Politik, Wirtschaft und Gesellschaft in Afrika südlich der Sahara"
- "Kenya". Political Chronology of Africa. Political Chronologies of the World. Europa Publications. 2001. p. 214+. ISBN 0-203-40995-7.
- Marcel Rutten (2008). "Kenya". In Andreas Mehler; et al. (eds.). Africa Yearbook: Politics, Economy and Society South of the Sahara in 2007. Vol. 4. Koninklijke Brill. pp. 335+. ISBN 978-90-04-16805-3. ISSN 1871-2525.
- Nic Cheeseman (2013). "Kenya". In Andreas Mehler; et al. (eds.). Africa Yearbook: Politics, Economy and Society South of the Sahara in 2012. Vol. 9. Koninklijke Brill. p. 337+. ISBN 978-90-04-25600-2. ISSN 1871-2525.
- Robert M. Maxon; Thomas P. Ofcansky (2014). "Chronology". Historical Dictionary of Kenya (3rd ed.). Rowman & Littlefield. ISBN 978-0-8108-7469-5.
