= Thomas Okelo-Odongo =

Former Kenyan politician

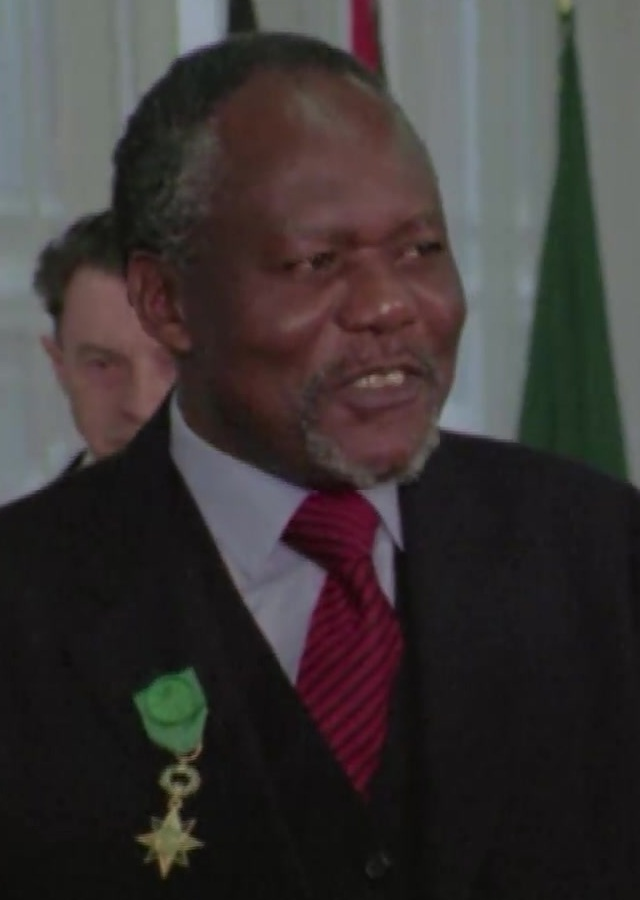
- Odongo receiving the Eurafrican Order of Merit in 1981

Member of the Kenyan Parliament
- In office 1963–1966
- Constituency: Kisumu Rural

Member of the Kenyan Parliament
- In office 1966–1969
- Succeeded by: Wilson Ndolo Ayah
- Constituency: Kisumu Rural

Personal details
- Born: 1927 Owaga Ward, Kisumu, Kenya
- Died: 20 September 1991 (aged 63–64) Kenya
- Party: KANU and KPU
- Spouse: Carolyn Okelo-Odongo (1959-)
- Children: 3
- Education: Howard University
- Nickname: Tom Okelo-Odongo

Thomas Okelo-Odongo (1927–1991) was a Kenyan politician, economist, and diplomat. He was elected as an MP for Kisumu Rural in 1963 under the Kenya African National Union party (KANU), serving as Assistant Minister for Finance. He later defected to the Kenya People's Union (KPU) founded by then ex-Vice President Jaramogi Oginga Odinga. He spent the latter part of his career serving on various executive boards of international financial organizations.

== Personal life ==
Thomas Okelo-Odongo was born in 1927 to Luo parents in Owaga Ward, Kisumu, Kenya.

In the late 1950s, he left Kenya to pursue a Master of Arts (M.A.) at Howard University in Washington, D.C., United States. He met his wife Carolyn Odongo (née Jackson) in 1957 while completing his Master's, marrying two years later in 1959. In 1960, they moved to live in London, England, before moving to Kenya in 1962 on the eve of the country's independence as the Commonwealth realm of Kenya. Upon returning to Kenya, Carolyn renounced her American citizenship due to Kenya's prohibition of dual citizenship at the time.

On 22 August 1966, Carolyn was arrested at their home after serving as a private secretary to Odinga. She was detained for 2 years and 4 months without access to visitation on ambiguous charges under the Preservation of Public Security Act. She was the first woman in Kenya to be detained without due process.

Okelo-Odongo had a son named William, and a daughter from a previous marriage, and with Karolyn, adopted a son named Francis.

Thomas Okelo-Odongo died on 20 September 1991 at an unspecified Aga Khan Hospital in Kenya.

== Career ==
=== Electoral politics ===
Okelo-Odongo first joined the Kenyan Parliament as the MP for Kisumu Rural in 1963 as a member of the KANU party. During this first term, he served as Assistant Minister for Finance.

In 1966, he defected to the KPU along with several other MPs following Jaramogi Oginga Odinga due to ideological differences with the KANU. In response to the creation of the KPU, the National Assembly passed a constitutional amendment requiring defectors to the KPU to seek re-election. However, Okelo-Odongo was re-elected in the 1966 by-election in Kisumu Rural constituency. Later in 1969, he was arrested and detained following the Kisumu massacre incited by an altercation between Odinga and then President Jomo Kenyatta, after which the KPU was banned.

=== Economic leadership and diplomacy ===
In 1971, he was appointed as a member of the Industrial court for a three-year term.by the then Minister of Labour E.N. Mwendwa. That same year, he was also appointed chairman of the Board of Directors of Kenya Reinsurance Corporation by the then Minister of Finance and Economic Planning Mwai Kibaki. During his appointment, he also became the secretary general of the African insurance Organization following its establishment in 1973.

He was appointed a director of the African Development Bank from 1976 to 1979 in Côte d'Ivoire. In 1979, he was appointed as the secretary-general of the African Caribbean and Pacific group of states (ACP) in Belgium. He served as secretary-general until the end of his appointment in 1984, being succeeded by Edwin W. Carrington of Trinidad and Tobago.
