= Ochola Ogaye Mak'Anyengo =

Kenyan trade unionist and politician (1930-1990)

Ochola Ogaye Mak’Anyengo
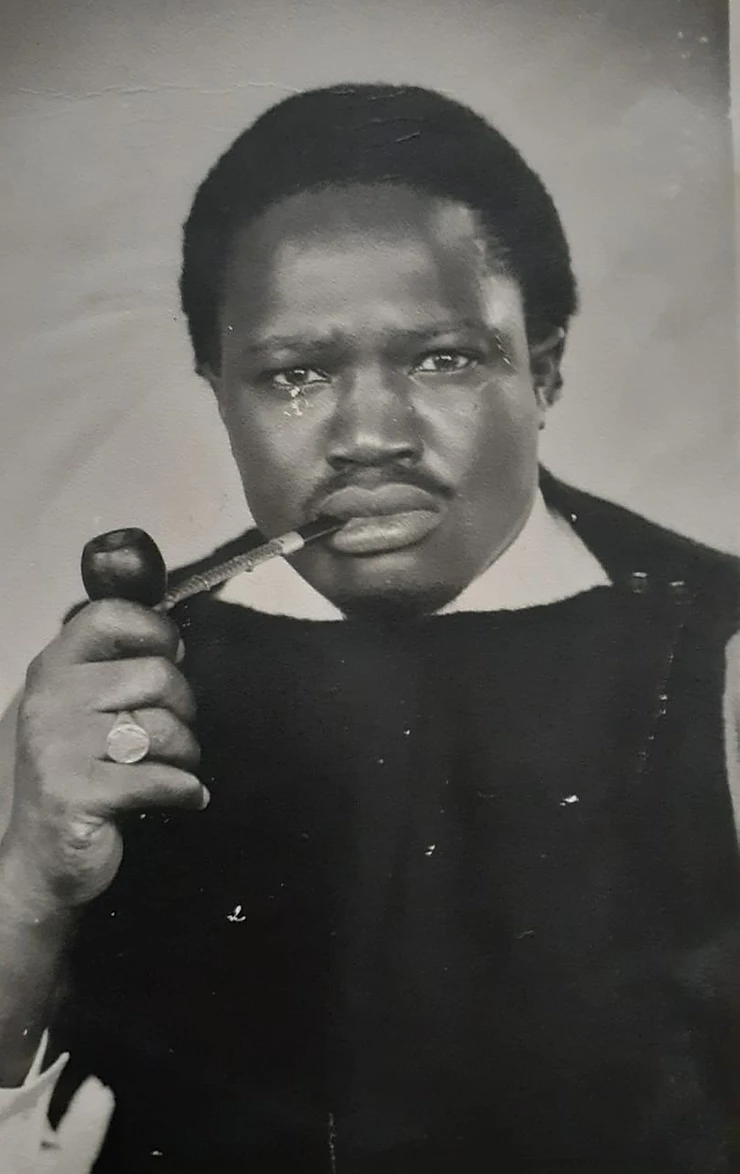

Member of Parliament
- In office 1983–1990
- Preceded by: Zablon Owigo Olang
- Succeeded by: Martin Otieno Ogingo
- Constituency: Ndhiwa

Assistant Minister of Health
- In office 1983 – April 1986
- President: Daniel Arap Moi

Assistant Minister of Foreign Affairs
- In office April 1986 – March 1988
- President: Daniel Arap Moi

Assistant Minister of Culture and Social Services
- In office March 1988 – November 1990
- President: Daniel Arap Moi

Personal details
- Born: George Philip Ochola; 13 April 1930 South Kavirondo, Nyanza Province, Kenya Colony
- Died: 6 November 1990 (aged 60) Nairobi, Kenya
- Party: Nairobi People's Convention Party; Kenya African National Union; Kenya People’s Union (K.P.U.)
- Parents: Yohana Anyengo (father); Rael Ogondi (mother)
- Education: African Labour College (Kampala); University of Chicago
- Occupation: Trade Unionist; Politician
- Trade Union Positions: Secretary-General of the Kenya Petroleum Oil Workers Union Assistant Secretary-General of the All Africa Trade Union Federation Vice-President of the Africa Chapter of the International Federation of Petroleum Workers Secretary-General of the Kenya African Workers Union Secretary-General of Railways and Harbours Union

Ochola Ogaye Mak'Anyengo, also known as George Philip Ochola (1930–1990) was a Kenyan trade unionist and Member of Parliament for Ndhiwa Constituency in South Nyanza District. He was involved in the fight for Kenya's independence and was a beneficiary of the Mboya-Kennedy airlifts.

== Early life and education ==
George Philip Ochola (later known as Ochola Ogaye Mak’Anyengo) was born in 1930 in South Nyanza, Kenya Colony, to Yohana Anyengo, a Licensed Minister in the Seventh-day Adventist Church - Ranen Field and Rael Ogondi. He completed his primary school education at Kamagambo Mission School and high school at Kisii Secondary School. Ochola first worked as a teacher before he worked as a freight dispatcher with the East African Railway and Harbour Administration. He left this job because of its low pay - 330 shillings a month. He then became a pump service and retail clerk with Kenya Shell Oil Company Ltd. He was then selected for a management trainee course at Kenya Shell Oil Company Ltd in 1954 in Nairobi.

Ochola was a beneficiary of the Mboya-Kennedy Airlifts. This was an initiative thought of by Tom Mboya and William X. Scheinman in order to address the colossal educational challenges facing Kenya. Kenya was agitating for independence from Britain but was plagued by a severe shortfall of African human capital. Opportunities for further education after high school for Africans were severely limited. The colonial government had feared that if a critical mass of educated Africans existed, they would demand greater participation in their own governance. Through the airlift program, several hundred Kenyans and other East Africans obtained scholarships to study in the United States of America with the support of John F. Kennedy, the African American Students Foundation (AASF) and prominent African Americans including Harry Belafonte, Jackie Robinson, Sidney Poitier and Martin Luther King Jr. Ochola had been elected as the Secretary General of the newly formed Petroleum and Oil workers Union and therefore had to negotiate labour contracts with international oil companies. This was a major challenge for him given his lack of experience and further education. Tom Mboya encouraged him to apply for the airlift program. Like many of the applicants for the airlift program, Ochola had to apply to several colleges and universities before he finally got accepted by the University of Chicago. He attended the African Labour College in Kampala for a preparatory course before flying to Chicago. Supported by the American Federation of Labor and Congress of Industrial Organisations (AFL-CIO), he obtained a diploma in Industrial Labour Relations from the University of Chicago. While he was studying there, the local branch of the Oil, Chemical and Atomic workers Union helped him find part time work at the Corn Products Refining Company in Summit, Illinois, to pay for his upkeep.

== Politics and Trade Unionism ==
=== Independence struggle and civil rights activities ===
While working at Kenya Shell Company Limited, George Philip Ochola became involved in the struggle for Kenya’s independence. He was a member of the Nairobi People’s Convention Party (NPCP), led by Tom Mboya. The Mau Mau rebellion had been suppressed and political activity by Africans was discouraged by the colonial government. This party became the only effectively organised and legal African nationalist party in Kenya. Jomo Kenyatta had been imprisoned on charges that he led the Mau Mau movement. This party took up the call for the release of Kenyatta following the lead by Oginga Odinga. The colonial government continually harassed party members and attempted to crush the party by arresting several members in March 1959 in what was the biggest round-up since the Mau Mau emergency. The state of emergency regulations drafted for the Mau Mau emergency were used to subjugate this party. George Philip Ochola stepped into a prominent leadership role following this round-up and his efforts ensured that the party continued to increase in size and popularity.

At the University of Chicago, George Philip Ochola, now often referred to as Ochola Mak’Anyengo, was a student leader of the All Africa Student Association. This was at the height of the civil rights movement in United States of America and anti-colonial movement in Africa. Mak'Anyengo published an article titled "Why Mau Mau" in Liberation, a publication which engaged with anticolonial struggles in Africa. Following the assassination of Patrice Lumumba, the first democratically elected leader of the Democratic Republic of the Congo, Mak'Anyengo led a peaceful protest along Michigan Avenue in March 1961 which was met by counter protesters.

President John F. Kennedy started the Peace Corps in February 1961 with the official aim of encouraging mutual understanding between Americans and other nations and states. Foreign students in the Chicago area had divergent opinions regarding the intentions and usefulness of the program. Ochola Mak'Anyengo was quoted in an article published in the Chicago Tribune saying "It is pointless to extend the arm of friendship to my country when a group of United States citizens, descendants of Africans, have no friendship here. Your best peace corps to African nations would be to improve the racial situation in America."

In September 1964, a delegation of the Organisation of African Unity arrived in Washington to seek an audience with President Johnson to discuss the American military assistance given to Moise Tshombe, the Premier of Congo. Ochola was quoted in the press warning that massive workers demonstrations against the American embassy and Americans in Kenya would occur if President Johnson did not meet the delegation. According to the press, he stated: "The time has come when Africans must resist the Americans’ stupid idea of looking on Africans as inferior people who cannot judge for themselves what is good or bad for them. The sons and daughters of Africans must arise to resist by all means American Imperialism and colonialism."

=== Trade Unionism and Politics ===
Before travelling to Chicago, Ochola Mak’Anyengo was elected to head the Petroleum and Oil workers Union soon after completion of the management trainee course with Kenya Shell Company Limited. After obtaining his Diploma from the University of Chicago, he returned to Kenya and took up several trade union positions. These include the Office of the Secretary-General of the Kenya African Workers Union, the Office of Vice-President of the Africa Chapter of the International Federation of Petroleum Workers, the Office of the Secretary-General of Railways and Harbours Union and the Office of the Assistant Secretary General of the All Africa Trade Union Federation.

Mak'Anyengo was also appointed to the Ministry of Labour Advisory Board in March 1963. As a member of this advisory board, he was involved in the development of the National Social Security Fund. This government agency, tasked with managing retirement funds for employees, was established in 1965 through an act of parliament.

Mak'Anyengo was a founding member of the Kenya People's Union (K.P.U.), a left leaning opposition party that was led by Jaramogi Oginga Odinga. This was during the Cold War, when Kenya was a stage for a proxy ideological battle between the western and eastern blocs. Although Kenya was a member of the non aligned movement, Cold War ideological divisions became enmeshed with local politics. Oginga Odinga, Bildad Kaggia, Pio Gama Pinto, Achieng Oneko, Dennis Akumu and Ochola Mak’Anyengo were among those who voiced concerns relating to corruption in government and increasing western influence in the country. They promised to pursue policies that would benefit all Kenyans but these were criticised as being radical.

=== Pio Gama Pinto Assassination ===
Pio Gama Pinto was a Kenyan of Goan descent. He was a freedom fighter who was detained during the colonial period. He was also Jaramogi Odinga’s chief tactician and link to the eastern bloc. He was assassinated on 25 February 1965 in what is recognised as Kenya’s first political assassination. The report of the truth, justice and reconciliation commission (2013) concluded that the Kenyatta government was responsible for numerous gross violations of human rights including the political assassination of Pio Gama Pinto. Ochola Mak'Anyengo was briefly arrested following accusations that he had hired men to frighten Pinto ostensibly because Pinto was his trade-union rival. One of these men ended up assassinating Pinto. These charges were dropped when one of the accused assassins denied having met Mak'Anyengo.

=== Detention without trial ===
In August 1966 Ochola Mak'Anyengo was arrested together with other leaders of the K.P.U. and detained without trial for several years. Those arrested included Oginga Odinga’s private secretary Oluande Koduol, the general secretary of the East African Common Services Civil Servants Union, Peter Ooko. Mak'Anyengo was imprisoned until July 1968. Upon release, he was unanimously re-elected, by popular vote, to continue heading the Petroleum and Oil Workers Union.

On 25 October 1969, a major incident occurred in Kisumu town, the capital of Nyanza Province. President Jomo Kenyatta attended the inauguration of the New Nyanza Provincial Hospital. Tom Mboya, a popular leader amongst the resident Luo community, had been assassinated on 5 July 1969 and as a result, political tensions were high. A demonstration ensued during the inauguration which led to the deaths of at least 11 civilians in the hands of police, by official accounts. Other estimates placed the death toll at closer to 100 men, women and children, some of whom were shot up to 50 km (31 mi) away from the demonstrations. This incident is often referred to as the Kisumu massacre. The Kenya People's Union (K.P.U.) was banned following this incident. Several party members, including Mak'Anyengo, were arrested on 27 October 1969. This was his second detention without trial.

Amnesty International ran a campaign - postcards for prisoners - to publicise his imprisonment without trial. In June 1970, Mak'Anyengo announced his intention to go on hunger strike to protest his imprisonment. In August 1970, several of those detained were released but Mak'Anyengo was held in prison until March 1974. Despite the official allegation, that he acted illegally against the government at the time of his arrest, Mak'Anyengo was never formally charged or tried for any wrongdoing. No evidence was ever brought forward to support the imprisonment.

=== Return to Trade Unionism and Politics ===
Following his release, he eventually returned to trade unionism and politics. Mak’Anyengo successfully ran for the office of secretary general of the Railways and Harbours Union in 1981. In 1983, he was elected as the Member of Parliament for Ndhiwa Constituency on a K.A.N.U. (Kenya African National Union) party ticket. During this period he was the Assistant Minister for Health, Assistant-minister for Culture and Social Services and Assistant-minister for foreign affairs.

== Death ==
Ochola Mak'Anyengo died in 1990 while in office following a short illness.

== Legacy ==
A eulogy delivered at the start of a parliamentary house meeting following his death described him as a veteran trade unionist and renowned freedom fighter with a notable sense of humour and debating skills. It was stated: "His contribution to the national development, devotion to serving his constituents and his dedication to the ruling party Kanu all speak for themselves."

== Publications ==
- Why Mau Mau by George Philip Ochola. Liberation. January 1960. Available from the University of Illinois Library at Urbana-Champaign. Digitised 9 March 2011
- Union Problems in Developing Countries by Ochola Mak’Anyengo. IUD Digest. 1962 Available from the Wayne State University Library. https://reuther.wayne.edu/node/4616
- How Politics Affect the Role of the Trade Union Leaders in Developing Countries by Ochola Ogaye Mak'Anyengo, Vice-President International Federation of Petroleum Workers. Petro. International Federation of Petroleum Workers 1963. From Cornell University Digitised 11 July 2011

== See also ==
- Tom Mboya, the man Kenya wanted to forget by David Goldsworthy. East African Publishers, 1982
