= Kisumu massacre =

Kenyatta era Carnage

Kisumu Massacre
- Location: 0.0999°S 34.7500°E; Kisumu, Kenya
- Date: 25 October 1969
- Attack type: Massacre
- Deaths: 11 (disputed)

The Kisumu massacre occurred when the presidential guard and police forces shot and killed several civilians in Kisumu Town, the capital of Nyanza Province in Kenya. This took place on 25 October 1969. The official death toll from government sources stands at 11 fatalities but other sources place this number at closer to 100. Victims included women and children, some of whom were shot 30–50 km away from the epicentre of the riots. According to media reports, the government of the day attempted to cover up the extent of the massacre.

== Background ==
The 1960s were a tumultuous time in Kenya’s history. The Independence struggle culminated in the release of Jomo Kenyatta in 1961 following a campaign started by Oginga Odinga who fought for Kenyatta's release from detention in order for him to take up the leadership mantle. Jomo Kenyatta became Kenya's first president in 1964 and Oginga Odinga his vice president. Despite Kenyatta enjoying widespread support across different ethnic groups, he and Odinga were perceived as the de facto leaders of their ethnic communities with Jomo Kenyatta representing the Kikuyu and Oginga Odinga representing the Luo. The global cold war was at its peak. The western and eastern blocs actively sought to influence local policy making and win allies resulting in a proxy cold war in Kenya. Local politics became enmeshed with cold war ideological divisions. Odinga and Bildad Kaggia criticised the Kenyatta government for adopting a corrupt land redistribution policy that did not benefit the poor and landless. Pio Gama Pinto, a freedom fighter, Oginga Odinga's chief tactician and link to the eastern bloc was assassinated on 25 February 1965 in what is recognised as Kenya's first political assassination. Odinga became increasingly sidelined in government and was eventually compelled to resign and start his own political party – the Kenya People's Union (KPU). Several members of Parliament defected from the ruling party KANU to join KPU. A parliamentary by election – the little general election – was held in June 1966 that forced these members to defend their seats. Outside Nyanza Province, Oginga Odinga's home turf, most KPU members including Bildad Kaggia lost their seats.

Shortly after the formation of KPU, a security Act was passed in Parliament in July 1966 that permitted the government to carry out detention without trial ostensibly to maintain law and order in situations where the current order was threatened. This Act was immediately used against KPU members. Two months after the election, In August 1966, a series of dawn raids by government police occurred. Ochola Mak'Anyengo (the secretary general of the Kenya Petroleum Oil Workers Union and Oginga Odinga's ally), Oluande Koduol (Oginga Odinga's private secretary) and Peter Ooko (the general secretary of the East African Common Services Civil Servants Union) were arrested together with other KPU members and detained without trial. Several members of the Luo community in government lost their jobs. On January 29, 1969, Argwings Kodhek, a pioneering Mau Mau lawyer, cabinet minister and Oginga Odinga ally, died in a car crash under mysterious circumstances. Tom Mboya, one of the few remaining members of the Luo community in the upper echelons of government at the time, widely touted as the heir apparent to Kenyatta, was assassinated 6 months after Argwings death on 5 July 1969. The political tension in the country was at its peak and these events set the stage for the Kisumu massacre.

== The Massacre ==
Four months after Tom Mboya's assassination, President Kenyatta visited Kisumu, the capital of Nyanza Province in order to inaugurate the newly built New Nyanza Provincial General hospital, a Russian funded hospital. President Kenyatta sought to stamp his authority in Nyanza province amidst the tension. The crowd in attendance became hostile, openly challenging Kenyatta, showing support for KPU and accusing him of involvement in Tom Mboya's murder. A war of words ensued between Kenyatta and Oginga Odinga which stoked the embers further. A riot started. The Presidential guard and police opened fire. Several civilians, men women and children were shot. By official accounts 11 people lost their lives. Other sources quote figures as high as 100 civilians. Some of these victims were shot in Ahero and Awasi, up to 50 km away from the site of the actual riots. Several people were injured.

== Aftermath ==
Two days after the massacre, all KPU members of parliament and a number of prominent party supporters were arrested. The country's main opposition party, Kenya Peoples Union was banned, turning Kenya into a one party state. Oginga Odinga was placed under house arrest until 1971. Even after his release he never fully regained his political clout. Mak’Anyengo, who was only released from earlier detention a year earlier, was arrested again and detained without trial until 1974. Jomo Kenyatta did not visit Nyanza Province again until his death in August 1978. His government downplayed the event. Almost all the photographic and film evidence from the day was destroyed.

The government subsequently neglected the development of Nyanza Province, resulting in abject poverty and lowering of the standard of living. The political rivalry between the supporters of Jomo Kenyatta and Oginga Odinga has waxed and waned since then but never been resolved. The general election of 2017 and the subsequent post-election violence strangely echoed events in the 1960s. President Jomo Kenyatta's son, Uhuru Kenyatta was running against Oginga Odinga's son, Raila Odinga in the presidential election. Chris Msando, the head of IT and communication of the Independent Electoral and Boundaries Commission was found tortured and murdered 12 days before the election amidst accusations that the incumbent party had plans to rig the elections. The election results were contested by Raila Odinga and his supporters. Demonstrations in Kisumu were violently suppressed by police, resulting in the death of civilians, including men, women and children not involved in the riots.
