= Jaramogi Oginga Odinga Mausoleum =

Mausoleum and museum in Kenya

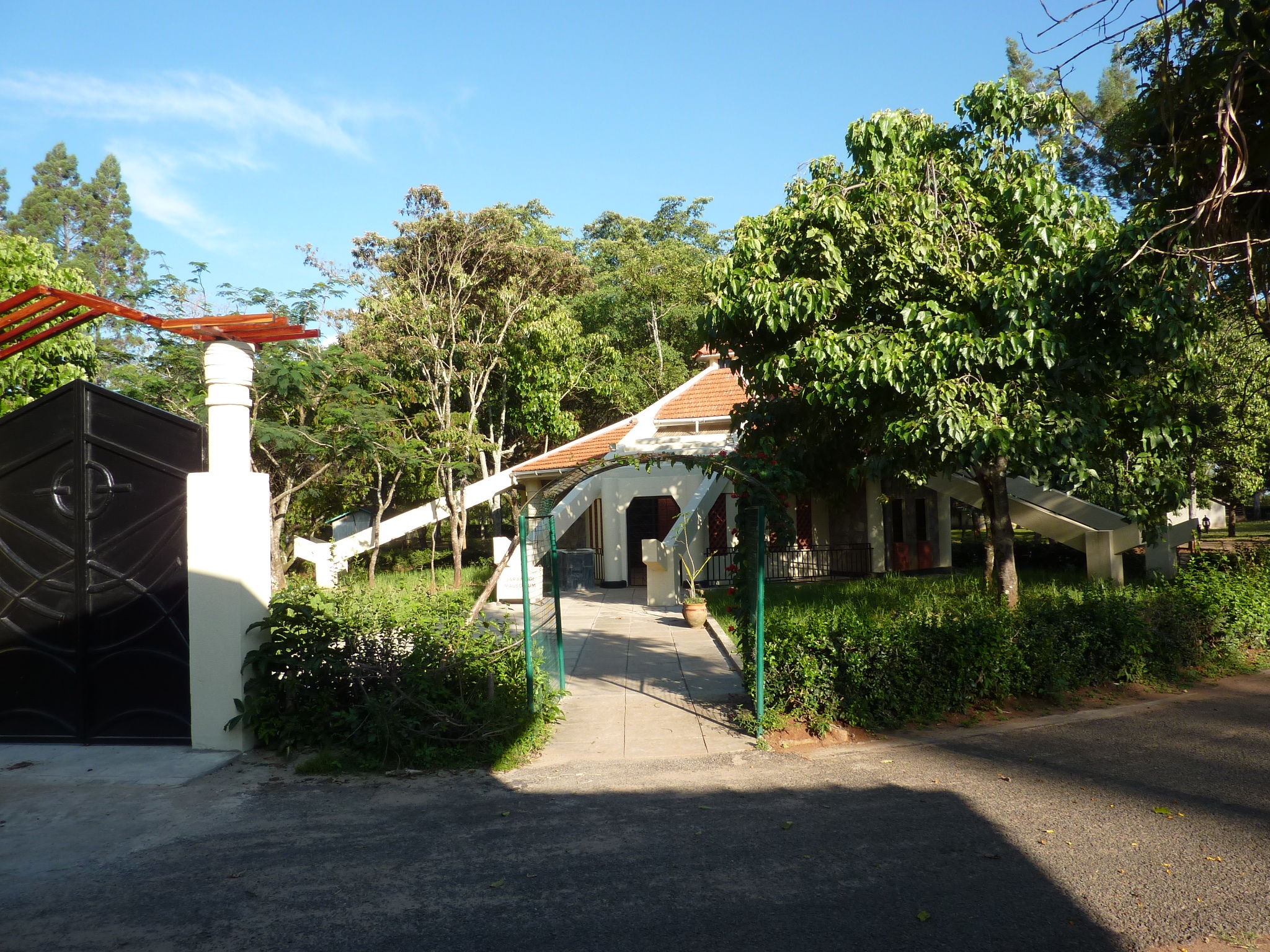
- Established: January 20, 1995; 30 years ago
- Location: Bondo, Kenya
- Coordinates: 0.112025°S 34.229642°E

The Jaramogi Oginga Odinga Mausoleum is a mausoleum and museum that exhibits artifacts related to Jaramogi Oginga Odinga and other political figures in Kenya's independence process. The museum also displays artifacts related to the Luo culture.

== History ==
The mausoleum was opened in 1995 by Olusegun Obasanjo, former president of Nigeria. In early 2012, Joachim Ndalo presented a painting of Ugandan President Yoweri Museveni at the mausoleum. In 2018, Kenyan President Uhuru Kenyatta visited the mausoleum. In 2019, the state-owned National Museums of Kenya Corporation began a series of rehabilitations for the mausoleum at a cost of KSh. 8 million.

== Collections ==
The mausoleum features photographs of Odinga's political career, and the mausoleum contains Odinga's personal items such as walking sticks. The mausoleum contains cultural artifacts such as weapons, spears, shields and bows of the Luo people. Some of these artifacts were used by Jaramogi when he was a Ker, a community leader of the Luo communities. Part of the lion sculptures in the mausoleum were sculpted by Oshoto Ondula. The museum contains photographs of African leaders such as Nelson Mandela, Kwame Nkrumah and Haile Sellasie. The mausoleum also contains portraits of Josiah Mwangi Kariuki, Pio Gama Pinto and Dedan Kimathi, as well as photographs of all the presidents and prime ministers of Kenya since 1963. The museum also displays a Kanu shield with the words "Nyayo".
