= Anyang' Nyong'o =

Kenyan politician (born 1943)

The Honourable Professor Anyang' Nyong'o FAAS, EGH
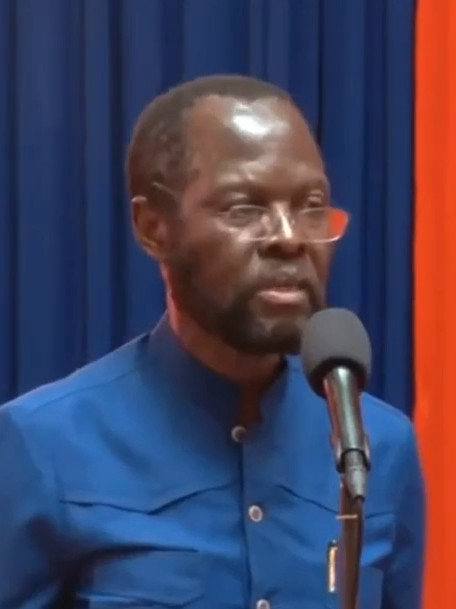
- Nyong'o in 2025

2nd Governor of Kisumu County
- Incumbent
- Assumed office 21 August 2017
- Deputy: Mathew Ochieng’ Owili
- Preceded by: Jack Ranguma

Senator of Kisumu County
- In office 28 March 2013 – 8 August 2017
- Preceded by: Position established
- Succeeded by: Frederick Outa Otieno

Minister of Medical Services
- In office 2008–2013
- President: Mwai Kibaki
- Prime Minister: Raila Odinga

Member of the Kenyan Parliament
- In office 2003–2013
- Constituency: Kisumu Rural

Personal details
- Born: Peter Anyang' Nyong'o; 10 October 1943 (age 82) Ratta, Central Nyanza, Nyanza Province, Kenya
- Party: ODM
- Spouse: Dorothy Ogada Buyu Nyong'o
- Children: 5, including Lupita
- Education: Makerere University (BA); University of Chicago (MA, PhD)
- Notable Awards: German-African Award (1995); Africa Brain Gain Award (2005)
- Website: Website; Official Twitter

Peter Anyang' Nyong'o (born 10 October 1943) is a Kenyan politician and author who is the Governor of Kisumu County. He is a former Secretary-General of Orange Democratic Movement. Professor Nyong'o was the acting party leader from 11 March until late May 2009 when Raila Odinga was in the United States and was elected to the National Assembly of Kenya in the December 2007 parliamentary election, representing the Kisumu Rural Constituency. He was the Minister for Medical Services and previously the Minister for Planning & National Development. He previously served as the senator of Kisumu from 2013 to 2017.

== Early life and education ==
Nyong'o was born in Ratta, Kisumu, Kenya. He completed his undergraduate studies at Uganda's Makerere University, where he was awarded a first class honours degree in political science. He served as Guild president of Makerere in 1969/70. He thereafter proceeded to his graduate and postgraduate studies at the University of Chicago, where he obtained an MA and a PhD in political science in 1977.

== Career ==
Nyong'o took teaching positions at the University of Nairobi, where he was a professor of political science and a visiting professor in universities in Mexico and Addis Ababa. Here, he served until 1987, before taking up the position of head of programs at the African Academy of Sciences.

He was a member of the Kenyan Senate representing Kisumu County from March 4, 2013 to August 8, 2017 having been elected on an ODM (Orange Democratic Movement) Party ticket. He is a former Member of Parliament for Kisumu Rural constituency, having been elected on a NARC ticket in the December 2002. His political career dates back to 1992, when he was first elected to parliament. He served as a nominated MP from 1998 to 2002. From 2003 to 2005, Nyong'o served as the Minister for Planning and National Development, and from 2008 to 2013 he was the Minister for Medical Services.

Nyong'o is credited for actively engaging in the movement for Kenya's second liberation during the previous KANU regime. For his contribution to scholarship and democratization, Nyong'o received a German-African Award in 1995.

From October to December 2013, Nyong'o was a Brundtland Senior Leadership Fellow at the Harvard T.H. Chan School of Public Health. In this role, he taught a course in the Department of Global Health and Population titled "Leadership Development in Global Health and Policy-Making in Kenya: The Case of Four Parastatals."

In 2023, United Nations Secretary-General António Guterres appointed Nyong’o to his Advisory Group on Local and Regional Governments, co-chaired by Pilar Cancela Rodríguez and Fatimatou Abdel Malick.

== Personal life ==
His children are Academy Award winning actress Lupita Nyong'o, Fiona Nyong'o, Esperanza Nyong'o, Zawadi Nyong'o, and Peter Junior Nyong'o, who plays soccer as a goalkeeper and is also an actor.
