= Kisumu Rural Constituency =

Kenyan electoral constituency

Kisumu Rural Constituency is a former electoral constituency in Kenya. It was one of three constituencies of Kisumu District. The constituency was established for the 1963 elections. The constituency had eight wards, all of which elected councillors for Kisumu County Council.

The constituency used to be represented by Robert Ouko. For the 1988 elections he moved to Kisumu Town Constituency (later split to Kisumu Town West and Kisumu Town East Constituencies).

Ouko was later assassinated in February 1990.

== Members of Parliament ==
Elections	MP	Party	Notes
1963	Tom Okelo Odongo	KPU	
1969	Wilson Ndolo Ayah	KANU	One-party system
1974	Wycliffe Onyango Ayoki	KANU	One-party system
1979	Robert Ouko	KANU	One-party system
1983	Robert Ouko	KANU	One-party system.
1988	Wilson Ndolo Ayah	KANU	One-party system.
1992	Peter Anyang' Nyong'o	Ford-K	
1997	Winston Ochoro Ayoki	NDP	
2002	Peter Anyang' Nyong'o	NARC	
2007	Peter Anyang' Nyong'o	ODM	

== Locations and wards ==
Locations
Location	Population*
East Seme	15,698
North Central Seme	16,398
North West Kisumu	23,144
Otwenya	15,759
South Central Seme	23,057
South West Seme	15,671
West Kisumu	20,547
West Seme	14,100
Total	x
1999 census.

Wards
Ward	Registered Voters
East Seme	4,706
North Central Seme	4,997
North West Kisumu	5,779
Otwenya	4,723
South Central Seme	6,898
South West Seme	5,187
West Kisumu	6,130
West Seme	4,489
Total	42,909
*September 2005.
