= Lokiriama Peace Accord =

1973 treaty between the Turkana of Kenya and Matheniko of Uganda

The Lokiriama Peace Accord is a peace treaty between the Turkana people of Kenya and the Matheniko of Uganda signed in December 1973 as a commitment by both parties to peacefully co-exist. The accord derives its name from Lokiriama, a remote town in Turkana District, North Western Kenya that is inhabited by the Turkana. A symbolic monument for this accord is situated at Lokiriama on the Kenya – Uganda border. It is believed that elders from both Turkana and Matheniko buried instruments of conflict, honey, milk and traditional brew in a pit over which the monument was constructed.

== Commemoration of the accord ==
Celebrations to commemorate the accord and re-affirm the commitment of all parties to upholding its content are held every year. The date for commemorating the accord is not fixed and may sometimes fall in December, earlier or later. In 2011 for example, commemoration was held on International Day of Peace which falls on September 21 every year. In addition to the Turkana and Matheniko, the commemorations bring together the Toposa people and Didinga people of Southern Sudan, other Karamojong people from Uganda and Nyangatom of Ethiopia. Commemorations are also graced with the presence of high-profile political and appointed leaders from all levels, including the central government for both Kenya and Uganda. Local and international civil society organizations also participate in the event often making contributions to meet various associated expenses such as media coverage, transportation of clan members and food for all attendees. The 2011 commemoration was attended by former Kenyan President Daniel Arap Moi, Parliamentary members, Ministers and high-profile civil servants from both Kenya and Uganda.
