= Wilson Ndolo Ayah =

Kenyan politician

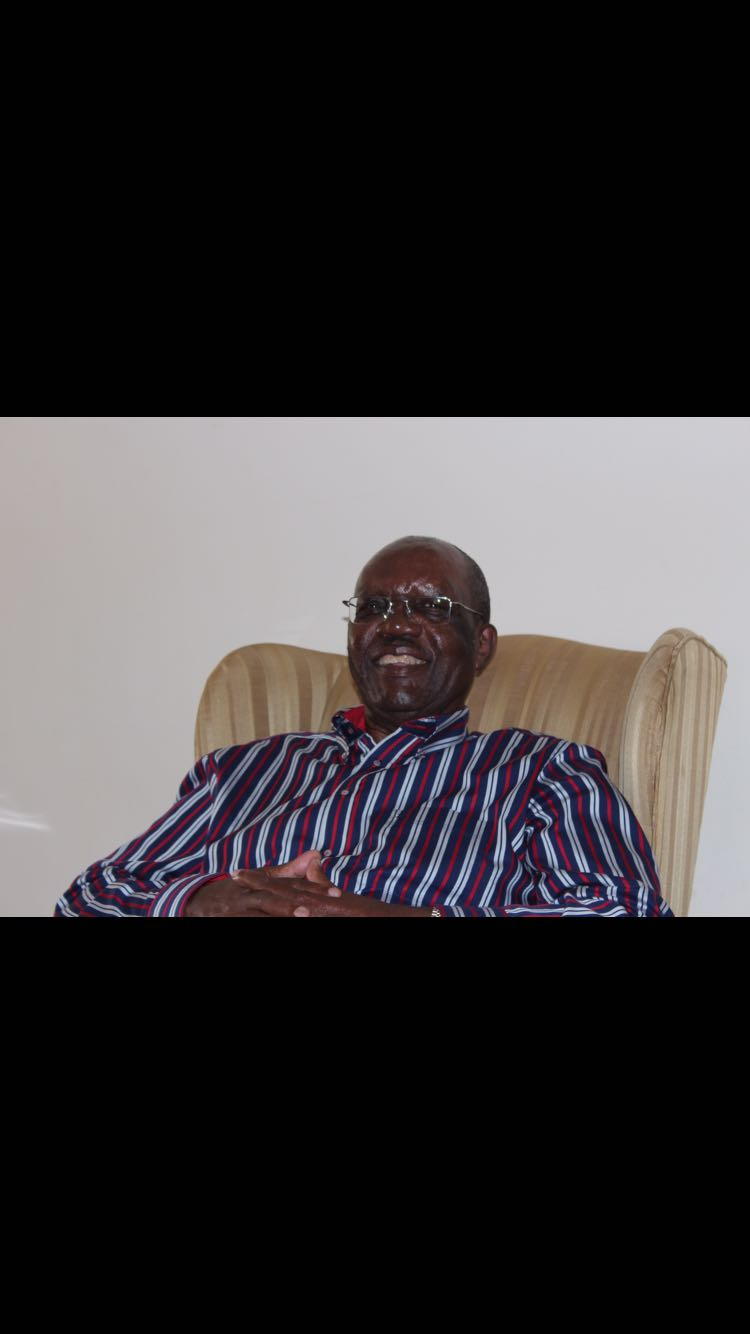
Wilson Ndolo Ayah

Wilson Ndolo Ayah (29 April 1932 – 16 March 2016) was a Kenyan politician. He served as Foreign Minister from 1990 to 1993 during Kenya's return to a multi-party system of governance. Wilson Ndolo Ayah served in the government of Daniel Arap Moi as minister from 18 August 1987 when he was first appointed Minister for Research Science and Technology. He was also a beneficiary of the Kennedy Airlifts.

== Early life and education ==
Ndolo Ayah was born in Kisumu Seme Kitambo village, Kenya and educated at Ngere School, Maseno School and Makerere University. Ayah was a beneficiary of the Kennedy Airlifts in 1959. He attended the University of Wisconsin–Madison graduating with an MSc in rural sociology.His thesis was titled "A study of land reform in Kenya and its probable effect on the family".Ayah, Wilson Ndolo. (1961). A study of land reform in Kenya and its probable effect on the family.

== Political life ==
Ndolo Ayah was first elected to parliament in the general elections of December 1969 as MP for Kisumu Rural Constituency. He lost in 1974, but was elected MP in the neighboring Kisumu Town Constituency in 1983. In the 1988 elections he switched constituencies with the late Dr Robert Ouko, becoming once again MP for Kisumu Rural until the year 1992. Ndolo Ayah then served as a nominated member of parliament from 1992 to 1997 when he retired from elective politics.

Ndolo Ayah then went on and served as the first chairman of Safaricom ltd the leading mobile network operator in Kenya. During his tenure as Chairman Ndolo Ayah and his team grew the company and watched it grow from a start up to one of the largest company in East Africa.

== Personal life ==
He married Caroline Herine (1944–1994) in 1966 and had one son Dr.Richard Ayah. He is Grandfather to Craig Ndolo Ayah, Hawi Tyler, Matthew Ayah and Mayiana Ayah.
