= Kenya People's Union =

- Leader: Oginga Odinga
- Deputy Leader: Bildad Kaggia
- Founder: Oginga Odinga
- Founded: 1966
- Dissolved: 1969 (banned)
- Split from: KANU
- Ideology: Socialism
- Political position: Left-wing

The Kenya People's Union (KPU) was a socialist political party in Kenya led by Jaramogi Oginga Odinga. The party was banned in 1969.

== History ==
=== Formation ===
In March 1966 a left-wing faction of the governing Kenya African National Union (KANU) instigated a mass defection from the party and formed the KPU. KANU responded by amending Kenya's constitution to force a 'little general election' in June 1966. All MPs who defected to the KPU were nominated by the party to contest their seats. The KPU had wide support in the country with most districts having a KPU MP, although they were strongest amongst the Luo people in Nyanza province. Candidates in then Kikuyu-dominated Central province were trounced by KANU.

=== Harassment ===
The state, dominated by the KANU party, employed many tactics to disrupt the KPU. Local employers were pressured into dismissing any staff who supported the KPU. This led to the dismissal of over 35 civil servants with others demoted. Additionally, passports were seized for KPU members so as to stop their international travel whilst also forcing companies to dismiss any KPU supporting employees.

Three years of political harassment and detention of party leaders followed that ultimately brought about the end of the party. The New Nyanza General Hospital was opened on October 25, 1969 which the president Jomo Kenyatta was not excited about as it was built with Soviet money and seen as Odinga's project. Kenyatta did, however, lead the opening ceremonies of the hospital to boost his popularity in Nyanza Province. The Luo's were generally hostile towards as Tom Mboya had been murdered few months earlier, with many fingers pointing at Kenyatta. Riots opened at the opening ceremonies, when KPU supporters attacked Kenyatta's entourage. What followed is now often referred to as the Kisumu massacre. Over 10 people were killed, by official accounts, as Kenyatta's security personnel opened a fire against the demonstrators. Odinga and several other KPU officials were arrested two days after the incident.

=== Dissolution ===
Oginga Odinga was placed under house arrest on 29 October 1969, after violent anti-government demonstrations in Kisumu. His arrest, as well as other KPU MPs and officials, led to the storming of the Kenyan embassy in Moscow by Kenyan students.

The KPU was banned on October 30, 1969, claiming that the KPU and all its branches were "dangerous to the good government of the Republic of Kenya" and that the KPU had become "more subversive both in its nature and in its objectives". This action transformed Kenya into a de facto one-party state.

== KPU politicians ==
The following politicians were affiliated with KPU. In the parenthesis is the constituency they represented.

- Ochola Ogaye Mak'Anyengo (Nhdiwa)
- Okuto Bala (Nyando)
- Ondiek Chilo (Nyakach)
- Bildad Kaggia (Kandara)
- Luke Rarieya Obok (Alego)
- John Odero-Sar (Ugenya)
- Jaramogi Oginga Odinga (Bondo)
- Tom Okelo-Odongo (Kisumu Rural)
- Fredrick Oduya Oprong (Elgon West, now part of Teso North, Teso South, and Nambale)
- Achieng Oneko (Nakuru Town)
- Joseph Mwasia Nthula (Iveti South)
- Wasonga Sijeyo (Gem)
- John David Kali (Nairobi East Constituency)
