= Pio Gama Pinto =

Kenyan politician and journalist (1927–1965)

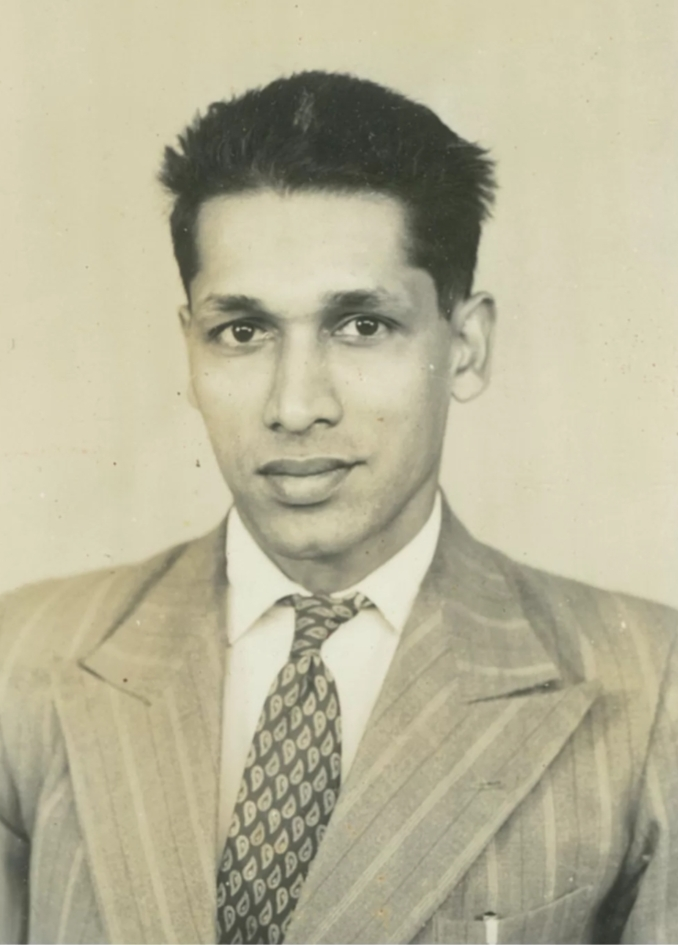
- Pinto in the 1950s (specific date unknown)

Member of Parliament
- In office 1 June 1963 – 24 February 1965
- Prime Minister: Jomo Kenyatta
- Preceded by: Office created

Personal details
- Born: 31 March 1927 Nairobi, Kenya Colony
- Died: 24 February 1965 (aged 37) Westlands, Parklands, Nairobi, Kenya
- Party: Kenya African National Union
- Spouse: Emma Pinto
- Children: 3
- Education: Karnatak College Dharwar
- Occupation: Politician, journalist

Pio Gama Pinto (31 March 1927 – 24 February 1965) was a Kenyan journalist, politician and freedom fighter. He was a socialist leader who was key in Kenya's struggle for independence. He was assassinated in 1965, leading many to consider him independent Kenya's first political martyr.

== Early years ==
Pinto was born in Nairobi on 31 March 1927 to a family of Goan Catholic descent. Born to immigrant Goan parents hailing from the Portuguese Goa, his father was an official in the colonial government of Kenya while his mother was a housewife.

At age eight, he was sent to Goa for his education and spent the next nine years there, passing his matriculation exams at St. Joseph's High School, Arpora and then moving to the Bombay Presidency, studying science at Karnatak College, Dharwar for two years before joining the Royal Indian Air Force in 1944 as an apprentice ground engineer. He then took up a job in the Posts and Telegraph office in Bombay, participated in a general strike and became a founding member of the Goa National Congress whose aim was the liberation of Goa from Portuguese rule.

When only seventeen, he started an agitation in Bombay against the Portuguese colonial occupation of Goa. His political activism soon made it necessary for him to return to Kenya to avoid being arrested and deported to the Tarrafal concentration camp in Cape Verde.

== Political career ==
In 1949, Pinto returned to Kenya and, after a succession of clerical jobs, became involved in local politics aimed at overthrowing British colonial rule in Kenya. In 1951, he co-founded the East African Indian Congress, a nationalist political party dedicated to building support for independence amongst the South Asian community of Kenya. Pinto also turned to journalism, writing for the Colonial Times, Daily Chronicle and The Uzwod. From 1952, he was also a regular contributor to the international services of All India Radio, where he produced a popular anti-colonial program named Goan Newsletter. He also worked closely with British anti-colonial activists, including the Independent Labour MP Fenner Brockway, to inform the world press of political developments in Kenya. This international activism, however, brought Pinto to the attention of Kenya's colonial authorities. In 1954, five months after his marriage to Emma Dias, he was rounded up in the notorious Operation Anvil and spent the next four years in detention on Manda Island. He was kept in confinement from early 1958 until October 1959 at Kabarnet.

In 1960, he founded the Kenya African National Union (KANU) newspaper Sauti Ya KANU, and later, Pan African Press, of which he subsequently became Director and Secretary. Pinto also formed Kenya Freedom Party, a multiracial socialist organisation, but dissolved the party when KANU allowed non-Africans to join its ranks for the first time. Pinto subsequently played an active role in campaigning for KANU during the 1961 elections, which the party won comfortably. From 1962, Pinto turned his attention to Mozambique, which was still under Portuguese colonial rule, and worked closely with the anti-colonial group FRELIMO. In 1963 he was elected a Member of the Central Legislative Assembly and in July 1964 was appointed a Specially Elected Member of the House of Representatives. He worked to establish the Lumumba Institute in 1964 to train KANU party officials.

== Assassination ==
On 24 February 1965, at the Westlands neighbourhood of Parklands in Nairobi, Pinto was shot at close range in the driveway while waiting for the gate to be opened. He was with his daughter in his car at the time of his killing. Pinto became the first Kenyan politician to be assassinated after Independence. At the time of his assassination, Pinto was 38.

=== Aftermath ===
The police set out to find three gunmen in connection with the murder. Kisilu Mutua and Chege Thuo, young adults at the time, were arrested on the day of the murder. Kisilu and Chege informed the C.I.D. that they were hired by Ochola Mak’Anyengo, the secretary general of the Kenya Petroleum Oil workers union, to frighten Pinto ostensibly on account of his interfering with the union. Mak’Anyengo was arrested following these accusations. At the police lineup however, the accused affirmed that Mak’Anyengo resembled the man who hired them, but he was not the actual culprit who had identified himself as Mak'Anyengo.

Mak’Anyengo was cleared of any involvement and released. After the case was heard in court, Thuo was acquitted, but Mutua was given the death sentence. This sentence was later reduced to life in prison following an appeal. When Mutua, convicted for the murder of Pinto, was released after 35 years in prison through a presidential pardon by the late President Daniel Arap Moi, Mutua insisted on his innocence and called for thorough investigations to identify Pinto's true assassins.

Different theories have been forwarded about the assassination with some suggesting that Pinto was killed by Jomo Kenyatta's men and others seeing Pinto's assassination as the extermination of an avowed Communist with links to the Mozambican liberation movement by neocolonial forces. An article published in Transition magazine in 1966 noted that a letter was circulated amongst Members of Parliament after Pinto's murder warning of the risks of cooperating with the eastern bloc. Bildad Kaggia was quoted saying that Pinto's killing was not an ordinary murder but a political one. Despite the wide perception that this was a political assassination, the police investigation treated the murder as not political.

== Personal life ==
Pinto was survived by his wife, Emma Gama and his three daughters Linda, Malusha and Tereshka. Two years after the assassination, Emma and her daughters emigrated to Canada.

Emma died in 2020.

== Legacy ==
After his death, Pinto's colleagues established the Pinto Trust Fund to help his widow and family to which leftist governments such as those of China and Tanzania contributed. In September 1965, Pinto's wife Emma, was invited to Santiago, Chile, to receive a posthumous prize awarded to her husband by the International Organisation of Journalists for his contribution in journalism to the liberation of African countries from foreign domination and exploitation. In 2008, Kenya released a series of four stamps titled Heroes of Kenya, one of which depicted Pinto.
