= Bildad Kaggia =

Kenyan freedom fighter and politician

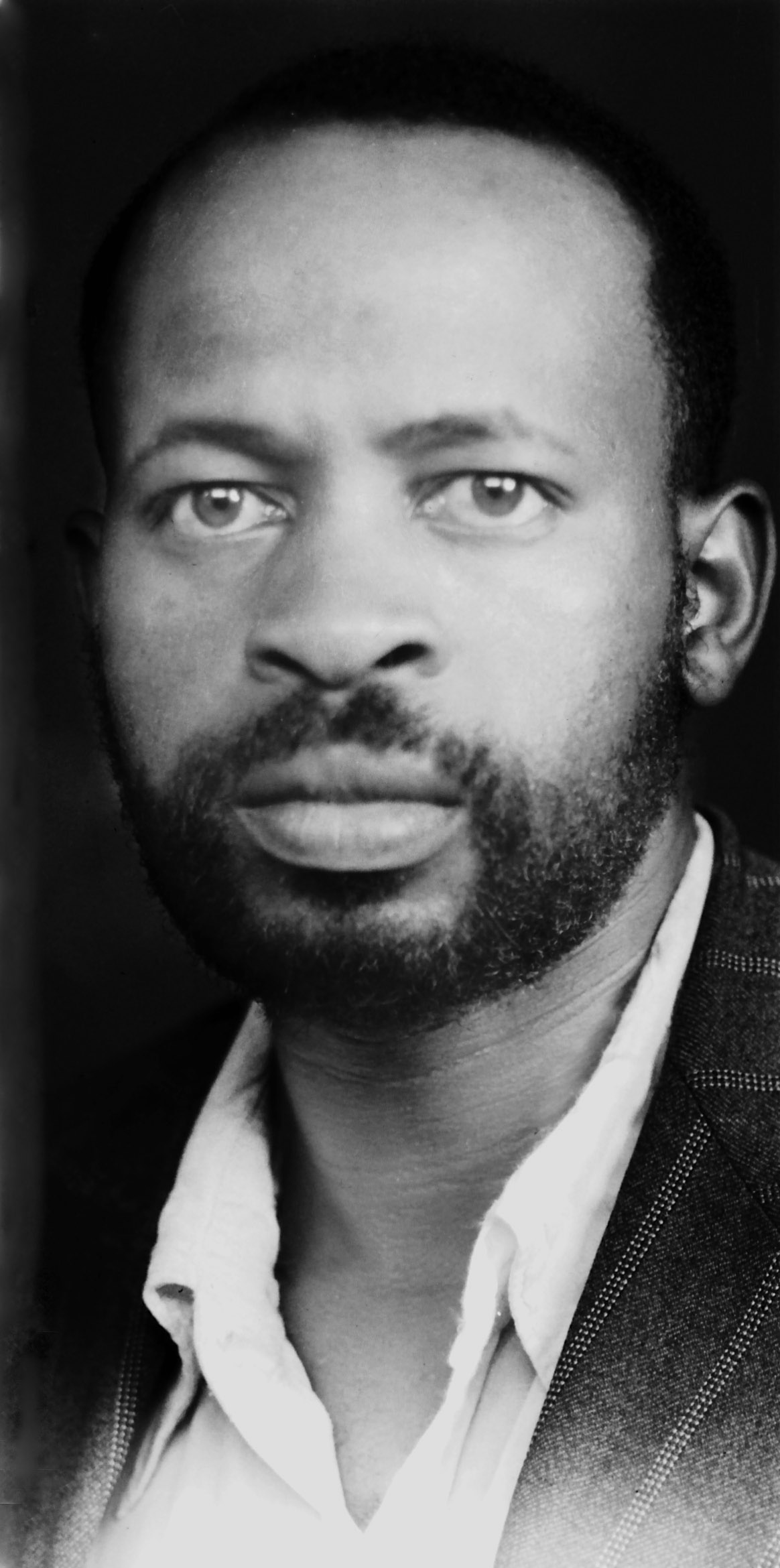
Bildad Kaggia in Nairobi in 1949

Bildad Mwaganu Kaggia (1921 – 7 March 2005) was a Kenyan nationalist, activist, and politician. Kaggia was a member of the Mau Mau Central Committee. After independence he became a Member of Parliament. He established himself as a militant, fiery nationalist who wanted to serve the poor and landless people. Because of this he fell out irreconcilably with Jomo Kenyatta.

== Early life ==
Kaggia was born in 1921, at Dagoretti, now part of Nairobi, where his father had moved from his home district of Mūrang'a District. Two years later his father moved back to Murang’a. Kaggia schooled at Santamor Estate and later at the Church Missionary Society School at Kahūhia. Kaggia did very well at the exams and was selected for the famous Alliance High School. Unfortunately, his father was not able to raise the school fee and Kaggia had to take up a clerical job at the District Commissioners' Office at Murang’a. When the Second World War broke out, Kaggia was moved to the military recruiting office. Despite hating war, Kaggia decided to join the army to seize the opportunity to travel to south-west Asia. When the War Office in London decided to create a unit in Britain to rehabilitate captured African soldiers, Kaggia applied and got the post of company quarter-sergeant, the first African to get this post. Most of the work in the army was routine and boring. During the years in the army Kaggia engaged in many correspondence courses (journalism, trade unionism and political science) which later would serve him well during his political career. His experiences in the army made him aware of the evils from racial discrimination and colonialism. In his opinion the foreign religions in Kenya were a stepping stone to colonialism and his people had to be liberated from this as well.

== Kaggia’s religion (Dini ya Kaggia) ==
Back in Kenya (1946) Kaggia denounced the church in the church. His objective was to create a purely African movement, divorced from European denominations and entirely independent of the European Church's doctrine. The new doctrine should include African customs and traditions. Kaggia had large followings in Central Province. This alarmed the church and their leaders asked the government for help. Subsequently, many times Kaggia and his followers were arrested and imprisoned for holding illegal meetings. Nevertheless, Kaggia's doctrine spread and he had followers from all denominations and his religion was spreading into other provinces, ultimately even reaching Nyanza. Kaggia was opposed to giving the movement a name, but, the people started calling it Andu a Kaggia (Kaggia's people). Later this became Dini ya Kaggia (Kaggia's religion).

Kaggia saw that indeed his religion was liberating the minds of people. They were no longer humble, European-fearing people; now they had the courage to attack the mzungu government. Consequently, Kaggia decided to leave the religious work to others and shifted his attention from spiritual liberation to political liberation.

== The Young Radical ==
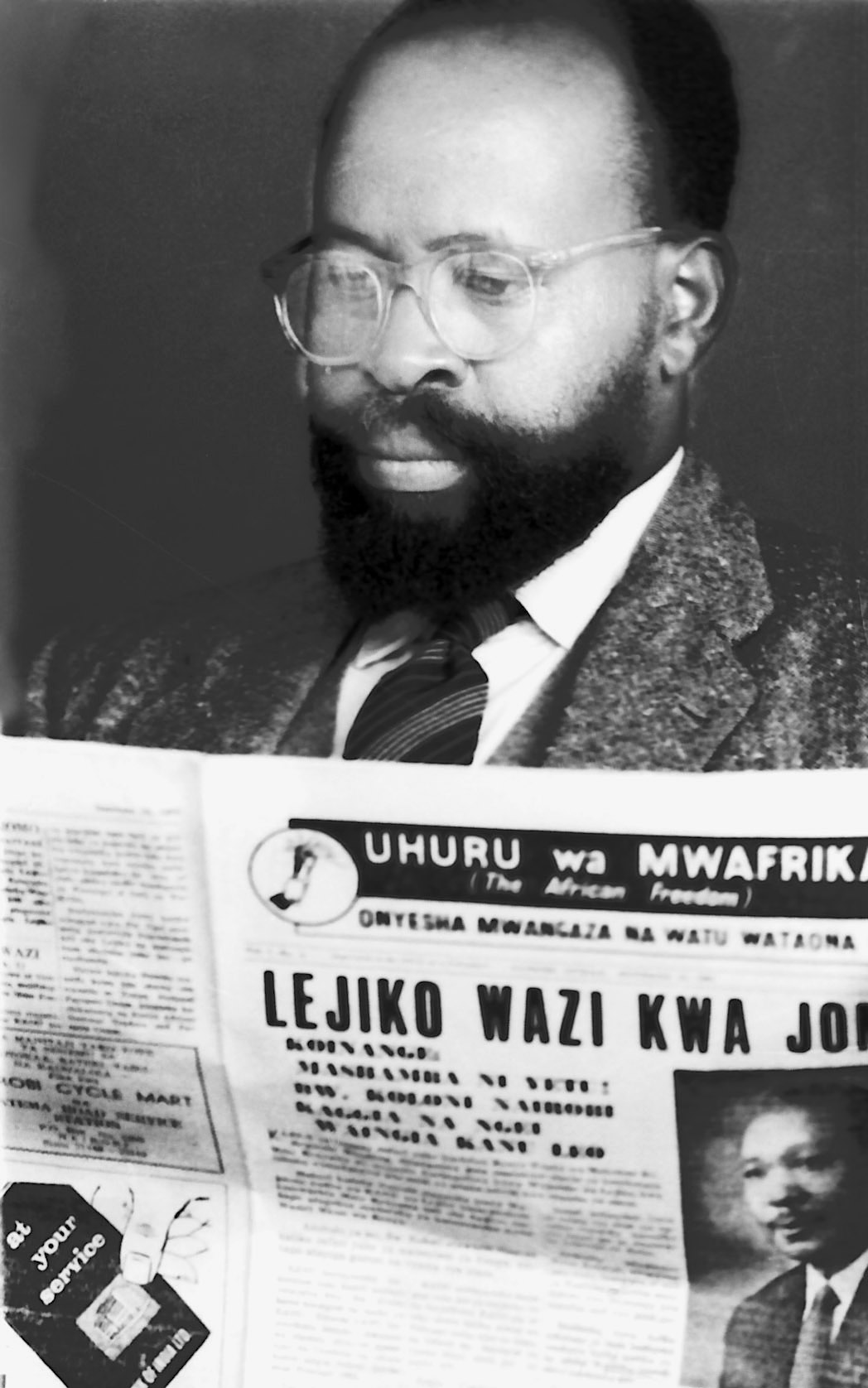
Bildad Kaggia in Nairobi in 1964

When Kenyatta was elected chairman of KAU in 1947 Kaggia joined KAU hoping that it would become more militant. However, at national level KAU was barely functioning and Kaggia shifted his interest to the trade unions. He admired the fire and militancy of leaders like Kubai en Makhan Singh. Kaggia founded the Clerks and Commercial Workers Union and in 1948 he became its chairman. This union became a member of the general union, the Labour Trade Union of East Africa. In 1950 Kaggia became president of Labour Trade Union of East Africa. The trade unions had much support in Nairobi and they took over the KAU branch Nairobi in 1951. Kaggia was elected its general secretary.

Later the trade unions tried to take over the national leadership of KAU but this failed when the president of KAU, Jomo Kenyatta, changed the election procedure at the last moment. This almost resulted in a split of KAU, but the 'militants' decided to remain in KAU for the sake of unity.

Kaggia started vernacular newspapers like Inoora ria Gikuyu and later Afrika Mpya to report KAU activities. These and other vernacular newspapers were instrumental in spreading the message of the militant leaders who advocated for independence.

Kaggia was a leading member of the KAU Study Circle which assisted its members with drafting memoranda, resolutions and discussions papers. He was the President of the Anti Federation League. This league was set up to oppose the proposed Federation with Central Africa, which would strengthen the white settlers' political control of these territories. The Anti-Federation League succeeded in its objective as Kenya did not join the Federation when in 1953 the Central African Federation of three British colonies: Northern Rhodesia (now Zambia), Southern Rhodesia (now Zimbabwe) and Nyasaland (now Malawi) was founded.

As a member of the African Advisory Council, Kaggia campaigned actively against the Nairobi municipal Council apartheid by-laws, which had created separate European, Asian and African areas in Nairobi. Kaggia considered it as one of his biggest achievements that these by-laws were repealed by the Municipal Council.

Despairing of constitutional change, he joined Mau Mau and sat on its central Committee. On 20 October 1952, he, along with the rest of the Kapenguria Six, was arrested in Operation Jock Scott, and charged inter alia with managing Mau Mau, and being a senior member of it. He was convicted at trial, and imprisoned until September 1961. Thereafter, he was confined to his home district. On 17 November 1961, all restrictions were lifted.

== Independence and after ==
In the 1963 elections, he won Kandara Constituency seat on a KANU ticket, and so had the distinction of a seat in independent Kenya's first parliament. Kaggia also served as a minister in the Kenyatta cabinet; his denunciations of corruption marked him out as a member of KANU's radical tendency. When Kenyatta and Mboya combined to purge the KANU left, he was one of their victims, with Kenyatta making the trip to Kandara to campaign against him. He joined Odinga's KPU, but eventually retired from active politics in 1974, after failing to recapture his seat.

Kaggia was the leading Kenyan leftist of the colonial period; probably the strategic planner on Mau Mau's central committee; notably anti-racist; and uncompromisingly committed to the poor.

== Bibliography ==
- Adenekan, Shola. (25 May 2005) Guardian Obituary
- Kaggia, Bildad. (1975) Roots of Freedom 1921–1963: the autobiography of Bildad Kaggia, Nairobi: East African Publishing House.
- Kaggia, Bildad M., Leeuw, W. de and Kaggia, M. (2012), The Struggle for Freedom and Justice; the life and times of the freedom fighter and politician Bildad M. Kaggia (1921-2005), Nairobi: Transafrica Press.
- Kinyatti, M. (2008) History of Resistance in Kenya (1884-2002), Nairobi: Mau Mau Research Centre.
- Rosberg, C.G. Jr. and Nottingham J. (1985)The Myth of Mau Mau; Nationalism in Colonial Kenya, Nairobi: Transafrica Press.
- Spencer, J. (1977) The Kenya African Union 1944-1953: a Party in Search of a Constituency, New York: Columbia University Press.
- Throup, D. W. (1988), Economic and Social Origins of Mau Mau, Nairobi: Heineman Kenya Limited.
