= 1966 Kenyan parliamentary by-elections =

A series of by-elections were held in Kenya on 11 and 12 June 1966, becoming known as the "little general election". They followed the defection of 29 members of the Kenya African National Union (KANU) to establish the Kenya People's Union. As a result, the KANU government passed a constitutional amendment to force the MPs to seek re-election. Although the KPU received the most votes in the by-elections, KANU won more seats.

== Results ==
=== House of Representatives ===
Party	Votes	%	Seats
Kenya People's Union	86,334	54.24	7
Kenya African National Union	72,584	45.60	12
Others	252	0.16	0
Total	159,170	100.00	19
Registered voters/turnout	482,300	–	
Source: Sternberger et al.

=== Senate ===
Party	Votes	%	Seats
Kenya People's Union	78,288	55.53	2
Kenya African National Union	61,698	43.77	8
Others	985	0.70	0
Total	140,971	100.00	10
Registered voters/turnout	482,300	–	
Source: Sternberger et al.
