= Jaramogi Oginga Odinga =

1st Vice President of Kenya

Jaramogi Alogo Oginga Odinga
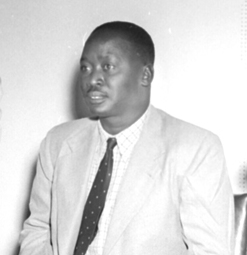

1st Vice-President of Kenya
- In office 12 December 1964 – 14 April 1966
- President: Jomo Kenyatta
- Preceded by: Office Established
- Succeeded by: Joseph Murumbi

Member of Parliament
- In office 1963–1969
- Preceded by: Gilbert Oluoch
- Succeeded by: Oburu Odinga
- Constituency: Bondo
- In office 1992–1994
- Succeeded by: William Odongo Omamo
- Constituency: Bondo

Personal details
- Born: Obadiah Adonijah; October 1911 Bondo, British East Africa
- Died: 20 January 1994 (aged 82) Kisumu, Kenya
- Party: List: Kenya African Union (1948–1959) Kenya African National Union (1960–1966) Kenya People's Union (1966–1990) Forum for the Restoration of Democracy (1991) Forum for the Restoration of Democracy – Kenya (1992–1994)
- Spouse(s): Mary Juma (d. 1984); Gaudencia Adeya; Susan Agik; Betty Adongo
- Children: 17 (including Oburu and Raila)
- Education: Makerere University
- Occupation: Politician
- Profession: Teacher

Jaramogi Oginga Odinga (October 1911 – 20 January 1994) was a Kenyan politician who became a prominent figure in Kenya's struggle for independence. He served as Kenya's first vice-president, and thereafter as an opposition leader. Jaramogi’s son CGH Raila Odinga (1945–2025) was the second Prime Minister of Kenya, and his other son, Oburu Odinga, is a former assistant minister in the Ministry of Finance, and Current ODM Party Leader after the death of Raila Odinga (2025)

Jaramogi is credited with the phrase "Not Yet Uhuru" which is the title of his autobiography published in 1967. Uhuru means "freedom" in Swahili and he was referencing his belief that even after independence from British colonialism, the brutal oppression of opposition in political affairs in Kenya, meant that the country had still not attained real freedom. For example, Jaramogi's son, Hon Raila Odinga also spent eight years in detention, although he later served as prime minister.

== Early years and career ==
Oginga Odinga was born in the village of Nyamira Kang'o, Bondo, to Mama Opondo Nyamagolo and Odinga Raila. In his autobiography, Not Yet Uhuru, Odinga estimates the date of his birth to be October 1911. Christened Obadiah Adonijah, he later renounced his Christian names and became known as Oginga Odinga. He was a student of Maseno School and Alliance High School. He went to Makerere University in 1940, and returned to Maseno High School as a teacher. In 1948 he joined the political party Kenya African Union (KAU).

Spurred to empower his Kenyan Luo ethnic group, Odinga started the Luo Thrift and Trading Corporation (registered in 1947). With time, Odinga and his group undertook to strengthen the union between Luo people in the whole of East Africa. His efforts earned him admiration and recognition among the Luo, who revered him as Ker – a title previously held by the fabled classical Luo king, Ramogi Ajwang, who reigned 400 years before him. Vowing to uphold the ideals of Ramogi Ajwang, Odinga became known as Jaramogi (man of the people of Ramogi).

== Vice presidency ==
According to Luo tradition, a Ker cannot be a politician, so Odinga relinquished his position as king in 1957 and became the political spokesman of the Luo. The same year, he was elected member of the Legislative Council for the Central Nyanza constituency, and in 1958 he joined the Kenya African Union (KAU). He was amongst the founders of the Kenya Independence Movement in 1959, and in 1960, together with Tom Mboya he joined Kenya African National Union (KANU). When Kenya became a Republic in 1964, he was its first Vice-President.

As Vice-President he did not agree with Jomo Kenyatta's government. While Odinga had called for closer ties with the People's Republic of China, the Soviet Union and other countries of the Warsaw Pact, Kenyatta was in favor of approaching the United States and the Western bloc. This led to Odinga resigning from his post and quitting KANU in 1966 to form the Kenya People's Union (KPU).

== In opposition ==
The friction between Odinga and Kenyatta continued, and in 1969 Odinga was arrested after the two verbally abused each other publicly at a chaotic function in Kisumu – and where at least 11 people were killed and dozens were injured in riots. That was when Jomo as the President of Kenya was to open New Nyanza General Hospital (Russia Hospital), in October 1969 which was seen as Odinga's project due to his Russian connection. Due to the incident KPU was banned making Kenya a de facto party state under KANU. He was detained along with other KPU members for eighteen months until the Government made decision to free him on 27 March 1971. He consigned to political limbo until after Kenyatta's death in August 1978. In the Uganda–Tanzania War (1978–1979), Odinga reportedly supported anti-Idi Amin rebels, sheltering a number of them at his farm in Bondo District during the preparation phase for the Battle of Tororo.

Kenyatta's successor, Daniel arap Moi, appointed Odinga as chairman of the Cotton Lint and Seed Marketing Board. He did not last long in the post, presumably due to past grudges and since he was still outspoken against Kenyatta's policies. Odinga accused Jomo as a "land grabber" and that was why they had differed. Odinga attempted to register a political party in 1982, but The Constitution of Kenya (Amendment) Act, 1982 (which made Kenya a de jure single-party state), foiled his plans.

Following the failed coup of 1982 against Moi's government, Odinga was placed again under house arrest in Kisumu. In 1990, he tried in vain with others to register an opposition party, the National Democratic Party. In 1991 he co-founded and became the interim chairman of Forum for the Restoration of Democracy (FORD). The formation of FORD triggered a chain of events that were to change Kenya's political landscape, culminating in 2002 ending KANU's 40 years in power – eight years after Odinga's death.

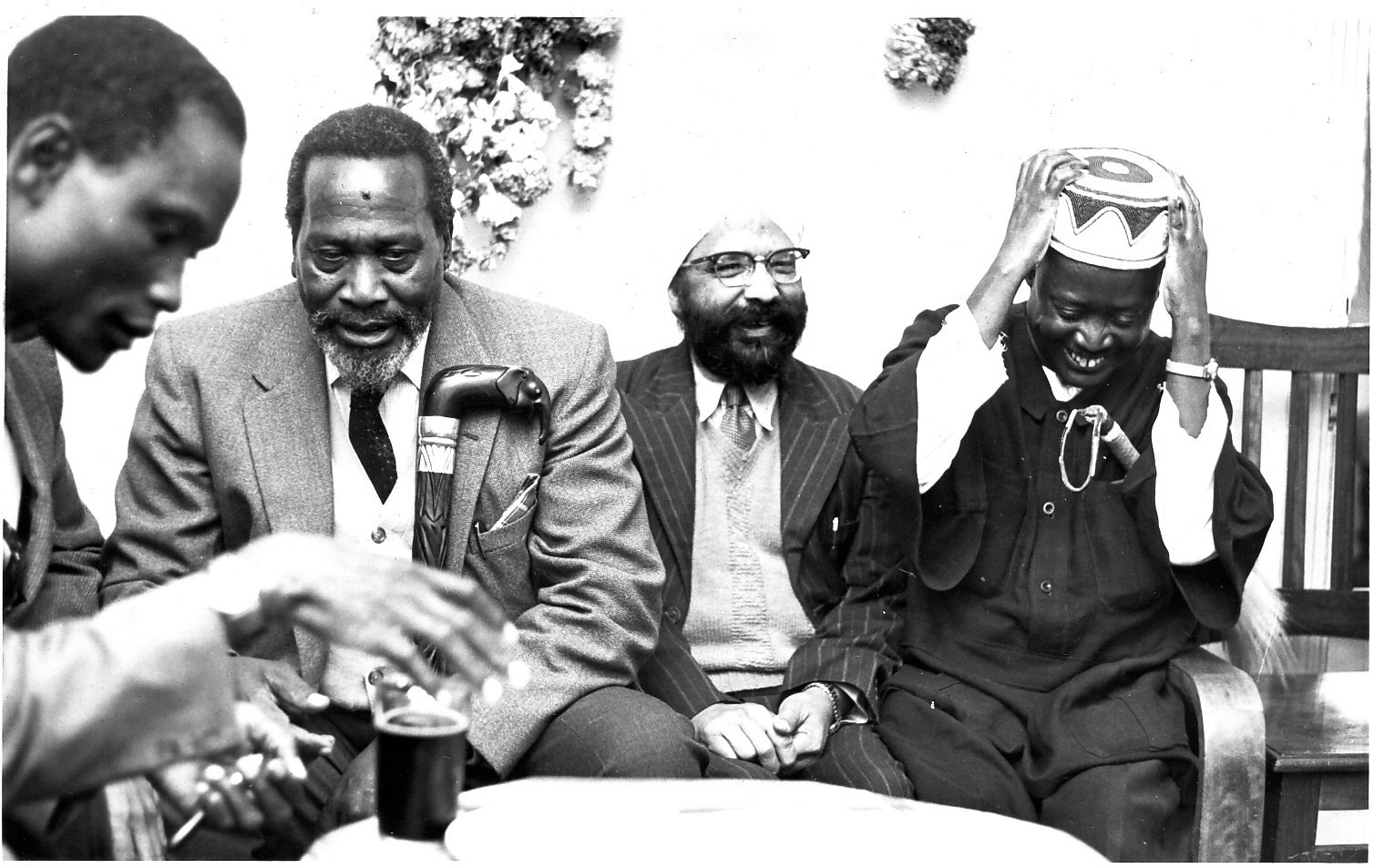
From left to right Achieng Oneko, Jomo Kenyatta, Makhan Singh and Oginga Odinga in 1961

FORD split before the 1992 elections. Odinga himself vied for the presidency on Ford-Kenya ticket, but finished fourth with a share of 17.5% votes. However, he regained the Bondo Constituency seat after being forced out of parliamentary politics for over two decades. Odinga died in 1994 in Aga Khan Hospital, Kisumu. He is buried at the Jaramogi Oginga Odinga Mausoleum in his Bondo home.

== Private life ==
Odinga was polygamous and had four wives: Mary Juma, Gaudencia Adeya, Susan Agik, and Betty Adongo, who was integrated into the family through traditional customs. With these wives, he had seventeen children. Mary was the mother of Raila and Oburu. Mary died in 1984.

== Global policy ==
He was one of the signatories of the agreement to convene a convention for drafting a world constitution. As a result, for the first time in human history, a World Constituent Assembly convened to draft and adopt the Constitution for the Federation of Earth.

== See also ==
- Luo people of Kenya and Tanzania

Political offices
Preceded by New office	Vice-President of Kenya; 1963–1966	Succeeded by Joseph Murumbi
