= Jonah Anguka =

Kenyan author and District Commissioner

Jonah Anguka is a Kenyan author and former District Commissioner at Nakuru, known as the only person to date to have been tried for the murder of Dr Robert Ouko, Kenya's Minister of Foreign Affairs, who was shot dead on 13 February 1990.

== Early life ==
Anguka graduated from the University of Nairobi in 1977 with a degree in political science. He served in Kenya's provincial administration during which time he was given paramilitary training at the Embakasi General Service Unit (GSU) Training Centre. Later he served in various postings as a district officer before becoming the District Commissioner (DC) to Nakuru in 1986. As such he was part of Kenya's internal security and intelligence organisation and directly responsible to Hezekiah Oyugi, then the Permanent Secretary, Provincial and Internal Security.

== Murder of Dr Robert Ouko ==
=== Investigation ===
Kenya's then Minister of Foreign Affairs, Dr Robert Ouko, was murdered on the morning of 13 February 1990, shot through the head, at the foot of Got Alila Hill, some 2.4 km from his country residence in Koru, near Kisumu, north western Kenya.

Anguka's wife, Mrs Susan Ngeso Anguka was Dr Ouko's Personal Assistant at the Ministry of Foreign Affairs. He also farmed land adjacent to Ouko's farm in Koru. Ultimately, Jonah Anguka was named in connection with the murder of Dr Ouko by five different authorities and individuals.

On 18 November 1991, at the Judicial Commission of Inquiry into Ouko's murder the former Detective Superintendent John Troon who had led Scotland Yard’s investigation (at the request of the Kenyan government) into the killing, stated that, 'There is a possibility that Mr Anguka may have some involvement or knowledge' [of the murder.

Troon was being questioned by Justice Akiwumi, Justice Gicheru and Bernard Chunga (State Prosecutor) during the Judicial Commission of Inquiry into Dr Ouko's death when he raised the case for further investigation of Anguka. The transcript of the relevant hearing explains Troon's reasoning.

Anguka was also named by the Kenyan police in a six-page section of their 'Further Investigations into the Death of the Late Dr Robert Ouko' in which they set out fourteen points as to why he should be considered a suspect.

Ultimately, Jonah Anguka was named in connection with the murder of Dr Ouko by six different authorities and individuals. Others who named him included Dr Ouko's brother Barrack Mbajah, Ouko's maid Salina Were, and in an anonymous written allegation sent to the Kenya police in December 1991 entitled "Who Killed Dr. R.J. Ouko and Why?"

=== Murder trial ===
Mr Justice Aganayana absolved Anguka, saying that. "The manner the heinous act (of killing Dr. Ouko) was planned and eventually executed… was so neat and professional that it could not have been undertaken by an ordinary person in the nature of the accused."

Judge Aganayana said, “… And given the time of the incident when the deceased is alleged to have left his home (around 3.00am) I wouldn't be convinced that after being massaged by Oddotte at 12.30am he (Anguka) would have left the house gone to Koru, removed the deceased from the house, taken him to some place where he was shot and then brought him to the scene and set his body on fire during that night, then went back at his house to be ready for duty at 7.15am…”

In this statement Judge Aganyana however, made a critical mistake: the forensic evidence adduced by Scotland Yard proved that Dr Ouko had been killed at the scene where his body was found.

For Cohen and Odhiambo, 'Anguka's partial and selective presence in the book was itself revealing.' They remarked on how Anguka, by his story, was present at so many of the key events during the search for Ouko and the investigation into his murder but silent about his presence at others. For them, how Anguka chose to write the story he was hardly present at all, except and especially when he could cast himself as a victim of the state'.

Professors Cohen and Odhiambo noted that Anguka was at the scene where the Dr Ouko's body was found within two hours of its discovery by the police. He was at Ouko's Koru home to answer the phone in Ouko's sitting room when Susan Anguka, his wife, called from the Ministry of Foreign Affairs to tell him that the body had been found. He was the first to break the news of her husband's death to Mrs Ouko. He was at the airport to meet the Scotland Yard team and he introduced Detective Superintendent Troon to Hezerkiah Oyugi and told him the latter would oversee the investigation. He was with Troon when the safe was opened in Ouko's bedroom. He interposed himself as a translator when Ouko's maid Salina Were was interviewed by Troon. He was with the Kenyan pathologist at Got Alila Hill when Ouko's body was first examined and he was also in Nairobi when Scotland Yard's forensic scientist Dr Iain West undertook an autopsy.

Anguka did not mention in that he was at the airport to meet Troon's team, writing only, 'on 21 February New Scotland Yard detectives arrived'.

Similarly, Cohen and Odhiambo suggested Anguka had 'largely airbrushed' his relationship with Hezekiah Oyugi (named by Scotland Yard as a prime suspect) from his account, noting that, 'the book is silent on Anguka's relationship, official and private, with Hezekiah Oyugi. His exceptional access to Oyugi had no reciprocal aspect in Anguka's telling, and that silence certainly "tells" a stronger story than Jonah Anguka intended.'

During the Scotland Yard investigation into the murder, Selina's accounts were regarded as the most truthful as she was the last person to see the minister to his bedroom. Former Kisumu Town East MP Gor Sunguh says the death of the witness is a possible pointer to the end of the inquiry and the revelation of truth. Gor Sunguh, who chaired the commission that probed Ouko's death, says more than 100 witnesses have so far disappeared in questionable circumstances. He says this will make it impossible for Kenyans to ever find out the truth. However, some argue that truth will be known, considering that majority of the witnesses had spoken before various investigating bodies. Selina was one of the few remaining witnesses. Some of the living witnesses include former DC Jonah Anguka, Zablon Agallo who was an Administration Police officer, Ouko's bodyguard Gordon Okoth, Phillip Ogutu (the gate keeper), Eric Ouko and James Onyango K'Oyoo. Many witnesses have died in mysterious circumstances over two decades since Ouko's murder, however in a recent documentary series aired on Citizen TV in March 2017, the idea of the "mysterious deaths" surrounding the killing of Dr Robert Ouko has been robustly challenged.

== Life in the United States ==
Jonah Anguka continues to live in California, United States, is an active member of the local community and a fundraiser for social projects in the Western Kenya region.

== Works ==
- Absolute Power: The Ouko Murder Mystery, Pen Press, London, 1998, ISBN 1-900796-01-5
