= Nyando District =

Coordinates: 0°17′S 35°07′E

Nyando district is a former district in Kenya which broke away from Kisumu District in Nyanza Province in 1998. Nyando district bordered the Rift Valley Province. The district was named after the Nyando River.

Its capital was a small town called Awasi, located 30 kilometres east of the Kisumu. Other towns and villages in the district included Muhoroni, Chemelil, Ahero, Miwani, Koru, Kibigori, and Fort Ternan.

In 2010, the district was merged into Kisumu County. It is now an electoral constituency within Kisumu county and had a population of 161,508 people (2019 census). Its current member of parliament is Hon. Okelo, Jared Odoyo who was re-elected for his second term on Orange Democratic movement party ticket in 2022

Local authorities (councils)
Authority	Type	Population*	Urban pop.*
Muhoroni	Town	31,148	13,664
Ahero	Town	61,556	7,891
Nyando	County	207,226	10,055
Total	-	299,930	31,610
* 1999 census. Source:

Administrative divisions
Division	Population*	Urban pop.*	Headquarters
Lower Nyakach	49,247	1,967	
Miwani	58,029	0	Miwani
Muhoroni	63,450	19,790	Muhoroni
Nyando (Awasi)	64,511	7,554	Awasi
Upper Nyakach	64,693	4563	
Total	299,930	29,586	-
* 1999 census. Sources: , ,

== Electoral constituencies ==
The district had three electoral constituencies:

- Muhoroni Constituency
- Nyakach Constituency
- Nyando Constituency
