= Kisumu–Chemelil–Muhoroni Road =

Kenyan road

Coordinates: 00°03′17″S 35°00′01″E

Route information
- Length: 31 mi (50 km)
- History: Designated in 2020; Completed in 2024 (Anticipated)

Major junctions
- West end: Kisumu
- Miwani; Kibigori; Chemelil
- East end: Muhoroni

Location
- Country: Kenya

Highway system
- Transport in Kenya

The Kisumu–Chemelil–Muhoroni Road, is a road in Kenya, that links the city of Kisumu, to the towns of Miwani, Kibigori, Chemelil, all in Kisumu County, to the town of Muhoroni, also in Kisumu County. The road is sometimes referred to as the Nyanza Sugar Belt Road.

== Location ==
The road starts at the neighborhood within Kisumu, known as Mamboleo, along the Kisumu–Kakamega–Webuye–Kitale Road. From there, this road travels eastwards, through Miwani, Kibigori, Chemelil, to end in Muhoroni, approximately 50 kilometres (31 mi), from Mamboleo. For the most part, the road is within Kisumu County. Between the towns of Miwani and Kibigori, the road forms the border between Kisumu County to the south and Nandi County to the north. It travels through Nandi County for a short distance, between Kibigori and Chemelil.

== Overview ==
This road was constructed in the 1960s, by the government of Kenya. Due to neglect, over the past two decades, the road deteriorated, developing potholes and gulleys. Public service vehicles abandoned the dilapidated road and instead used the 63 kilometres (39 mi) Kisumu–Ahero–Awasi–Muhoroni Road, that is better maintained.

The road is of economic importance to Kenya, because along this road lie at least three large sugar plantations and factories. Miwani Sugar Factory, Chemelil Sugar Factory and Muhoroni Sugar Company, all lie along this road. When upgraded, the road will ease the transportation of raw cane to the factories and of crystalline sugar to markets. The road is designated as a Class C road, (named C4 on map), and is under the jurisdiction of Kenya National Highway Authority (KeNHA).

== Upgrading and widening ==
In 2020, the Government of Kenya, through its parastatal KeNHA allocated funds for the rehabilitation of this road. Tendering was done in March 2020.

In August 2020, the government allocated KES:4.9 billion (approximately US$45.6 million) towards the resurfacing of this road to class II bitumen standard. Other improvements include widening the road to 11 metres (36 ft), with shoulders, culverts, drainage channels, passing lanes, bus stops and access roads in urban centers. In some sections the road will be widened to dual carriage.

Note: US$1.00 = KSh107.43 on 17 September 2020

== See also ==
- List of roads in Kenya
- East African Community
