= Muhoroni Constituency =

Kenyan electoral constituency

Muhoroni
- constituency for the Parliament of Kenya
- Muhoroni Constituency within Kisumu County

- Kisumu County within Kenya
- County: Kisumu
- Population: 154,116
- Area: 658 km^{2} (254.1 sq mi)

Current constituency
- Number of members: 1
- Party: ODM
- Member of Parliament: James Onyango Oyoo
- Wards: 5

Muhoroni is an electoral constituency in Kenya. It is one of seven constituencies of Kisumu County.

The constituency was established for the 1988 elections, when it was split from the Nyando Constituency. It was one of three constituencies of the former Nyando District.

== Members of Parliament ==
Elections	MP	Party	Notes
1988	Matthew Onyango Midika	KANU	One-party system.
1992	Justus Aloo Ogeka	Ford-K	
1997	William Odongo Omamo	NDP	
2002	Patrick Ayiecho Olweny	NARC	
2007	Patrick Ayiecho Olweny	ODM	
2013	Onyango K'Oyoo	PDP	

== Wards ==
Wards
Ward	Registered Voters	Local Authority
Fort Ternan	1,535	Muhoroni town
God Nyithindo	3,829	Muhoroni town
Koru	3,872	Muhoroni town
Muhoroni Town	3,325	Muhoroni town
Owaga	982	Muhoroni town
Ombeyi South	3,200	Ahero town
Chemelil	6,696	Nyando county
Miwani	2,789	Nyando county
North East Kano	6,918	Kisumu County
Nyang'oma	6,149	Kisumu county
Ombeyi North	3,968	Kisumu county
Tamu	4,774	Kisumu county
Total	48,037	
*September 2005.
