= Zachary Onyonka =

Kenyan politician (1939 - 1996)

Dr. Zachary T. Onyonka (1939–1996) was a Kenyan politician who served his country as a member of Parliament from the age of 29 in 1969, and later as a cabinet minister until 1996 in various ministries.

He served in Education, Economic Planning & Development and Trade and Foreign Affairs, Planning and National Development. Well Known within the Kisii community, he was always at loggerheads with then Nyaribari Chache MP Simeon Nyachae until he died.

== Career ==
Onyonka was elected to parliament in the 1969 elections from Kitutu West Constituency when he trounced the first cabinet minister from Kisii, Lawrence Sagini Ndemo. He was the youngest MP at about 27 years. He retained his parliamentary seat until his death.

He was famous for leading an anti-Nyachae crusade in Kisii after he was released from Kodiaga prison in Kisumu. He had been arrested and charged with murder following a fatal shooting incident involving his bodyguards and a voter in then Kitutu West constituency campaigns. Ouru Ndege was shot dead after he attempted to attack Dr. Onyonka with a knife during the stormy 1983 campaigns along Kisii-Migori road junction.

=== Assassination attempt ===
His rival, John Bosco Mboga had just addressed his supporters in the area and when Onyonka, who was a cabinet minister in President Moi's government arrived, Ndege attempted to stab him with a sword leading to the minister's bodyguards shooting him to death. Onyonka and his guards did not have a car at the time of the shooting.

He was rescued by a matatu driver, Joseph Moya Nyambariga, from Botoro area in Bomorenda, Bonchari. He drove the sieged minister in his matatu, christened Bolingo Na Ngai Express to safety at Suneka Chief's camp. He was arrested soon after and locked up in Kisumu awaiting trial on murder charges. The prosecution was unable to prove the case against him and in 1984, Onyonka was set free.

He had won the hotly contested election in absentia and after two years in the cold, Moi appointed him Minister for Foreign Affairs.

=== 1988 elections ===
Before the 1988 elections, Onyonka led a group of politicians from Kisii dubbed the Four Os. This stands for Onyonka, Obure (Chris from Bobasi) Omanga (Andrew from Nyaribari Chache) and Onyancha (David from West Mugirango) to launch the famous "Kebirigo Declaration" in which Nyachae was denounced. The Kebirigo declaration was a strong political ideology that stood for independence of each constituency in Kisii against manipulation from Nyachae.

At that time, it had become increasingly evident that Nyachae, who was a powerful civil servant, was planning to plunge into active politics. Onyonka alleged that Nyachae had embarked on a series of secret campaigns, recruiting candidates against incumbent MPs so that he could make it to parliament with a clean slate of leaders, if he was cleared by KANU to run for elective seat.

The Kebirigo declaration was therefore meant to assert the authority and legitimacy of each member of parliament from Kisii and also sought to reject the political dominion from Nyaribari, Nyachae's home constituency.

== Death and legacy ==
After Onyonka's death in 1996, he was succeeded by Jimmy Nuru Angwenyi as MP for Kitutu Chache. His son Richard Momoima Onyonka, later dethroned Angwenyi to become the area MP. After the 2013 electoral review, Kitutu Chache was divided into two constituencies, North and South (Mosocho).

Preceded by Elijah Mwangale	Foreign Minister of Kenya; 1987-1988	Succeeded by Robert Ouko (second time)
