= Maseno =

Town in Kisumu County, Kenya

Maseno is a town in Kisumu County, Kenya. It is situated along the Kisumu–Busia highway, approximately 25 kilometres northwest of Kisumu City. Another road connects Maseno to Vihiga town, located about 15 kilometres to the east. The Equator passes through the town, making it one of Kenya's notable equatorial settlements. Kombewa lies approximately 10 kilometres west of Maseno. The town stands at an elevation of 1,503 metres (4,934 feet) above sea level.

Maseno is widely recognised as one of the leading educational centres in western Kenya. The town is home to the prestigious Maseno School, one of the country's oldest national secondary schools. Established in 1906, the institution has earned a reputation as an academic powerhouse and a dominant force in Kenyan school sports, producing numerous distinguished alumni in public service, academia, business, sports, and other professional fields. The school's long-standing tradition of excellence has played a significant role in shaping the identity and development of the town.

According to the 1999 census, Maseno Division had a population of 65,304, of whom 2,199 were classified as urban residents. Maseno forms part of Kisumu County and falls within Kisumu East Constituency.

The town derives its name from the Luo word oseno or oluseno, meaning a fig tree. The name was given by Church Mission Society (CMS) missionary Rev. J. J. Willis, who camped beneath a large fig tree at the site in 1906. In the same year, Chief Ogolla Wuod Ayieke granted land to the missionaries, leading to the establishment of Maseno School and Maseno Mission Hospital. These institutions became important centres of education, healthcare, and Christian missionary activity in western Kenya.

Maseno is also home to Maseno University, a major public university whose main campus is located in the town. The university is one of the largest contributors to the local economy through employment opportunities and student expenditure on housing, food, transportation, entertainment, and other services. Together, Maseno University and Maseno School have established the town as a prominent hub of education, research, and intellectual development in Kenya.

The town serves as a commercial and administrative centre for the surrounding rural areas, supporting trade, education, healthcare, and transportation networks across parts of Kisumu, Vihiga, and Siaya counties.

Maseno is the birthplace of Raila Odinga, former Prime Minister of Kenya and a prominent Kenyan politician, and Pamela Mboya, a noted diplomat, educator, and public figure.
