= Rozaah Akinyi Buyu =

Kenyan politician

Member of the National Assembly
- Incumbent
- Assumed office 2022
- Preceded by: John Olago Aluoch
- Constituency: Kisumu West Constituency

Personal details
- Party: Orange Democratic Movement

Rozaah Akinyi Buyu is a Kenyan politician from the Orange Democratic Movement (ODM). She represents the Kisumu West Constituency in the National Assembly.

== Life ==
She went to primary school in Kisumu and she continued her schooling at Loreto Limuru High School. She then went to Kenyatta University where she graduated with a B.Ed. and taught for six years. In 1992 she joined Johnson & Johnson for seven years.

One source says that she was elected to parliament in 2017. In the 2022 Kenyan general election she become one of the first women to be elected MP in Kisumu County since independence. The first had been Grace Onyango in 1969, Grace had also been a former teacher and she served until 1983 before she was replaced by male MPs in the seven constituencies of Kisumu County. One of the later ones was Olago Aluoch who served for three terms before he was replaced by Rozaah Akinyi Buyu.

== See also ==
- 13th Parliament of Kenya
