= Miguna Miguna =

Canada-based Kenyan attorney and politician

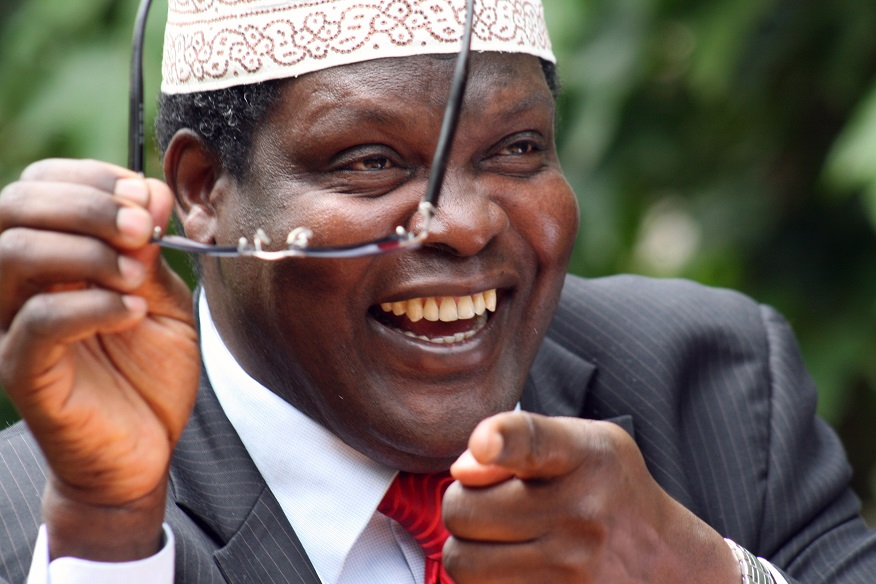

Senior Adviser to the Prime Minister on Coalition Affairs and Constitutional Affairs
- In office 6 July 2009 – 4 August 2011
- Prime Minister: Raila Amolo Odinga

Personal details
- Born: Miguna; 1962 Magina, Kenya
- Citizenship: Kenya, Canada
- Party: ODM (2007–2011); NRM-Ke (2017)
- Education: University of Toronto (BA); Osgoode, York Uni. (JD), (LL.M)
- Notable work(s): Peeling Back The Mask; Kidneys for the King; Treason: The Case Against Tyrants & Renegades

Miguna Miguna (born 1962) is a Kenyan lawyer and advocate of the High Court of Kenya. He practices law as an attorney, a barrister and solicitor in Toronto, Canada. Miguna served as a senior adviser to former Kenyan Prime Minister Raila Amollo Odinga from 2009 to 2011.

== Early life and career ==
Miguna was born in Magina, Kenya. He attended Apondos Primary School in Magina Village-Nyando before proceeding to the prestigious Njiiri School in Murang'a for his high school and then the University of Nairobi, where he became a student leader in 1986 and 1987. He was detained by the Moi regime and expelled from the university in 1987 for championing multi-party democracy in Kenya.

Upon his release, he fled to the neighbouring Tanzania on foot where he was granted asylum by the UNHCR, staying there briefly before being granted asylum in the Kingdom of Swaziland. Subsequently, he was granted permanent political asylum in Canada in 1988, where he continued to pursue his higher education. He obtained a Bachelor of Arts in political science and philosophy from the University of Toronto in 1990 and thereafter studied law at Osgoode Hall Law School of York University in Toronto, obtaining a Juris Doctor degree in 1993. He was admitted to the Ontario Bar in 1995. He obtained a Master of Laws (LLM) from the Osgoode Hall Law School of York University in 2001.

Miguna served as the Coordinator for the Committee for Democracy in Kenya (CDK) from 1988 to 1994.

He articled at the civil rights law firm of Charles Roach (Roach, Schwartz and Associates) in Toronto setting up his law practice where he stayed until 2007 when he returned to Kenya. He was admitted to the Kenyan Bar in 2008.

== Political career ==
Upon his return to Kenya, he contested in the primaries of the Orange Democratic Movement (ODM)'s nomination for Nyando Constituency, but lost to Frederick Outa Otieno. He was part of the ODM's campaign team during the 2007 general election. In March 2009, he was appointed as Prime Minister Raila Odinga's senior adviser on coalition affairs and concurrently served alongside Kivutha Kibwana as the Joint-secretary to the Permanent Committee on the Management of the Grand Coalition Affairs. In August 2011, he was accused of gross misconduct and was thereby suspended without pay. The suspension was lifted on 29 December 2011 but Miguna rejected his reinstatement.

In 2010, some members from the Party of National Unity side of the coalition accused him of being a foreigner for holding a Canadian passport, as Kenyan law didn't recognise dual citizenship at the time he acquired Canadian citizenship, although the Kenyan constitution was changed in 2010 to allow for it. They wrote, "While Mr. Miguna Miguna was born in Kenya, he has since become a citizen of Canada. Like all other expatriates working in the country, our laws require that Mr Miguna apply for and obtain the relevant permits to live and work in Kenya." Miguna responded that he was a Kenyan citizen by birth and that he had never renounced his citizenship. However, he did acquire Canadian citizenship at some point while in exile. Miguna justified his actions by saying at the time, "When fleeing a dictatorial regime, one uses any means and even Mr. Odinga once used a Tanzanian passport."

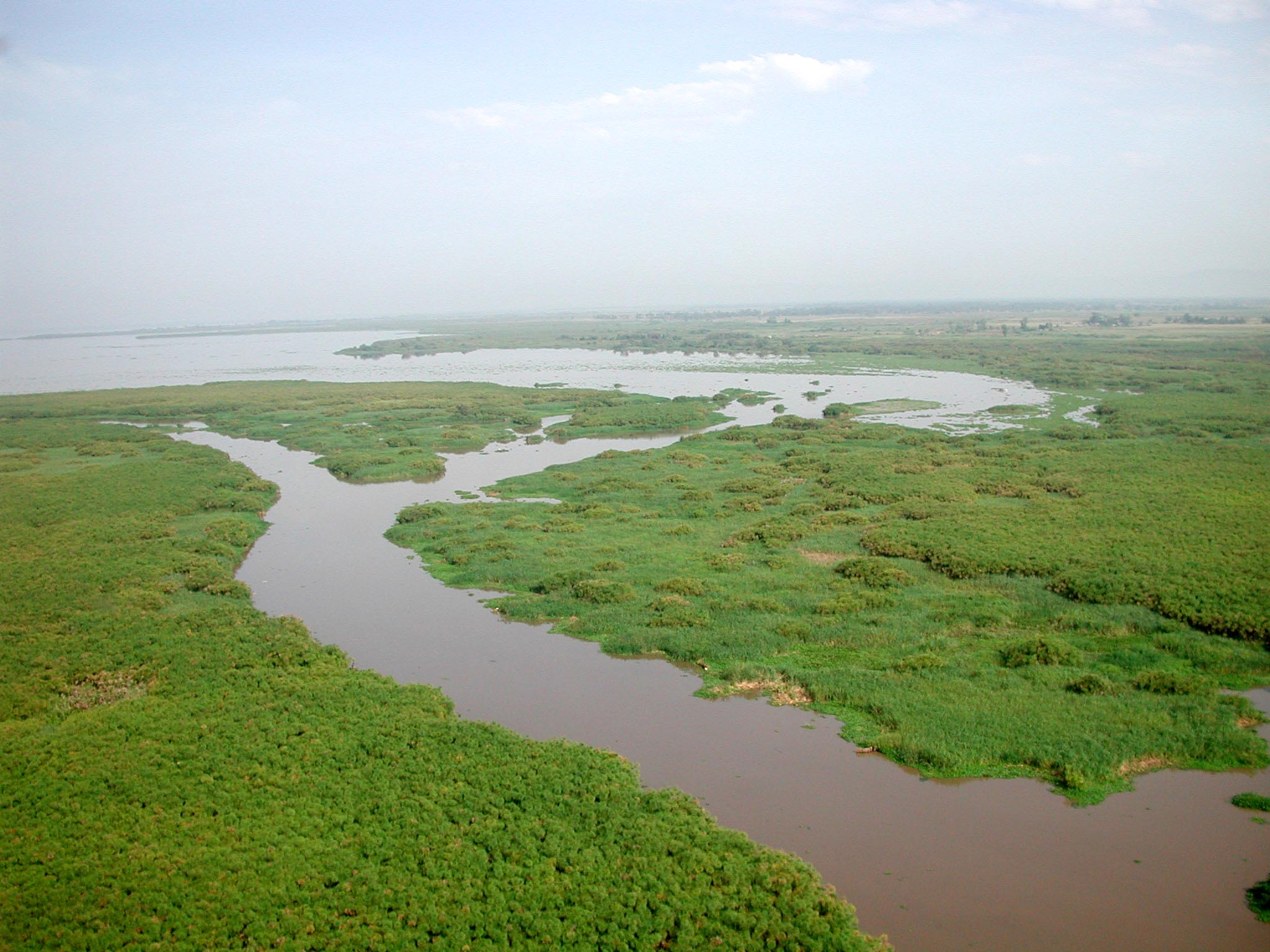
River Nyando

On 14 July 2012, he launched his first memoir titled Peeling Back the Mask: A Quest for Justice in Kenya. The book was very critical of Raila Odinga and purported to expose him as a charlatan. It sparked protests from Odinga's supporters in Ahero who burned Miguna's effigy and mock coffin and thereafter sprinkled its ashes into River Nyando. He was attacked whilst promoting his book at a hotel in Mombasa and had to be rescued by the police.

In September 2012, he terminated his life membership from ODM and announced his candidacy for Governor of Nairobi County in the 2013 gubernatorial election as an independent candidate. He later on cancelled his candidacy. He launched a sequel to his memoir in February 2013 titled Kidneys for the King: Deforming the Status Quo in Kenya.

In an act of rejection of his former political boss, Miguna endorsed Uhuru Kenyatta, Odinga's rival, in the 2013 presidential election. Kenyatta went on to win the poll, albeit amid accusations made by Odinga that the election was marred by poll fraud.

In March 2016, Miguna declared that he would be vying for the position of Governor for Nairobi as an independent candidate. He unveiled a manifesto in August 2016. The manifesto promised visionary leadership based on integrity, clear and progressive transformative policies, programs and a commitment for service delivery, job creation and infrastructure development. Although he came in fourth in the 2017 Nairobi gubernatorial elections held on 8 August 2017, Miguna refused to concede defeat.

In the August 2017 presidential election, Odinga and his supporters alleged that Kenyatta's election victory was a fraud. The Supreme Court of Kenya nullified the declaration of Uhuru Kenyatta and William Ruto as validly elected president and Deputy President, respectively. The Supreme Court also held that the Independent Electoral and Boundaries Commission (IEBC) had committed numerous illegalities and irregularities and failed to conduct the 8 August 2017 presidential election in strict adherence to the Constitution of Kenya, 2010 and other applicable statues. The Court ordered the election repeated within sixty days. But it also ordered the IEBC to open its servers and KIEMS kits for a forensic audit before the repeat election. The High Court of Kenya ruled that the election was not procedurally valid, and another election was held in October. Mr. Odinga boycotted that election, saying it would not be conducted fairly and credibly.

Kenyatta was declared the winner with 98% of the vote.

In a dramatic reversal of stance, Miguna became one of Odinga's most outspoken advocates after the 2017 presidential election; he also emerged to become one of the sternest critics of the Kenyatta administration, accusing it of despotism and rigging itself into power.

Miguna is the leader of the National Resistance Movement, an opposition group for civil disobedience activities that supported Odinga. On 30 January 2018, the Kenyan government declared the National Resistance Movement to be an organised crime group.

On 30 January 2018, in a mock swearing in ceremony, Miguna administered an oath of office to Raila Odinga, where Odinga proclaimed himself "the people's president". The government reacted by shutting down all television and radio broadcasts and arresting Miguna and another lawyer (T J Kajwang') who had witnessed the ceremony (but did not arrest Odinga, since that would further inflame his supporters). Miguna was taken to court and charged with "being present and consenting to the administration of an oath to commit a capital offence, namely treason". The High Court ordered that Miguna be released on bail and that television broadcasts be permitted, but the government disobeyed the orders. Chief justice David Maraga criticised the actions of the officials, saying: "Disobeying court orders is inimical to the rule of law." Miguna's Kenyan passport was seized and he was forced out of the country. Interior Cabinet Secretary Fred Matiang'i said that the reason his passport had been seized is that it had been issued irregularly and fraudulently. Government officials said that Miguna did not disclose his Canadian citizenship when he applied for a Kenyan passport in 2009, so his application was not valid. Miguna countered that "The constitution is crystal clear: no one can invalidate or purport to cancel the citizenship of a Kenyan born citizen." The government also declared the National Resistance Movement to be organised crime group.

On 26 March 2018, Miguna tried to return to Kenya. He arrived at the Jomo Kenyatta International Airport in Nairobi on a flight from Dubai, and when he demanded to be granted entry pursuant to multiple valid court orders, Immigration officials refused to allow him into the country, insisting that he should enter as a tourist or visitor, which he refused to do. On the day he arrived, state security agents tried to deport him to Canada via a KLM flight to Amsterdam that was preparing to depart, but he loudly resisted. The Immigration officials detained him at the airport.Video footage of the incident was circulated widely on the internet. He was detained at the airport for 2–3 days, and was forcibly returned to Dubai. He had smuggled his Canadian passport out of the airport in order to thwart his deportation and presented only his Kenyan national ID card when requesting entry to the country, which was refused as an improper document for use when entering the country from Dubai. He said his refusal to provide the Canadian document was "because I arrived in Kenya on March 26 as a Kenyan born citizen". One of his attorneys said in an affidavit that Miguna's Canadian passport had been seized by Kenyan officials, but Miguna and the Kenyan authorities both later contradicted that statement, and once Miguna was returned to Dubai he was able to proceed to Canada from there – presumably by producing the Canadian passport. During his detention, several court order were issued directing the Kenyan authorities to release him, not to remove him from the jurisdiction of the court and when the government officials refused, The Honourable Justice George Odinga of the High Court in Nairobi convicted the Minister for Interior, Fred Matiang'i, the Principal Secretary for Immigration, Gordon Kihalangwa, the Director General of Police, Boinett and the head of the CID, George Kinoti for contempt of court and fined them. In defiance of court orders, the Kenyan authorities had insisted that Miguna must complete forms to "regularise" his Kenyan citizenship.

On 28 March 2018, Human Rights Watch issued a statement calling for Miguna's release. Otsieno Namwaya of Human Rights watch said "Kenyan authorities should urgently obey the numerous court orders to either release or produce Miguna in court. Holding him at the airport without any form of judicial review, in violation of court orders, is a blatant example of arbitrary detention."

On 28 March, just hours before Miguna was deported from the country, High Court judge George Odunga declared the interior minister, the national police chief, and the head of immigration to be in contempt of court for their actions in defying a court order to release Miguna, and fined them US$2000 (UK£1,400) each.

Miguna said that he had been physically assaulted, tortured and forcibly drugged with an intravenous sedative before being put on the plane back to Dubai, and was unconscious on the journey. He released a photograph of an injury to his hand that he said had been inflicted by the injection of the sedative. A number of journalists covering the story said they had been assaulted by government officials. In a Facebook post, Miguna said "I was dragged, assaulted, drugged and forcefully flown to Dubai" and "I'm sick. My ribs and body is hurting all over. This is a travesty of justice."

On 29 March, Irungu Houghton, the executive director of Amnesty International for Kenya, released a statement calling for authorities to allow Miguna to enter the country to participate in judicial proceedings, saying "The way Miguna was treated showed blatant disregard for his human rights, after the High Court ordered that he be allowed to re-enter the country. The Kenyan government must also respect and protect the right to freedom of expression and allow journalists to freely report on the case without harassment, intimidation or attacks."

Amnesty said "The continuous disregard for court orders and attacks on the media is steadily eroding the rule of law and weakening human rights safeguards in the country," and requested to "also launch a thorough, independent and impartial investigation into the unlawful use of force by the police to prevent journalists from doing their job". On 12 April 2018, former Kenyan Chief Justice Dr Willy Mutunga is reported to have called Miguna's treatment inhumane and unconstitutional in an interview with John Githongo, He is quoted as stating that "It is nauseating. It is very painful."

On 14 December 2018, the High court of Kenya released a landmark judgment in which it strongly indicted the state for having grossly violated Miguna's constitutional and fundamental rights such as his right to citizenship by birth which it ruled he did not lose and the state could not terminate. The Court also held that Miguna was a citizen entitled to a Kenyan Passport and ordered the State to issue him with a new and valid passport. The Court held that the destruction of Miguna's house, his arrest, incommunicado detention and forceful removal from Kenya were illegal and inhumane; that they constituted physical, emotional and psychological torture. Justice Enoch Chacha Mwita awarded Dr Miguna Miguna Sh7 million as damages for the violation of his rights during his rights and Kshs. 270,000 as special damages for the destruction of his house in Runda by the state. The court ordered the state officers who had been sued to pay the damages personally.

In December 2019, Miguna Miguna made public his intention to return to Kenya through his Twitter account in what would be his third attempt. Citing protection from a court order issued in December 2018 to allow his return, he stated that his flight would land in Nairobi's Jomo Kenyatta International Airport on the morning of 11 January 2020. However, his return aborted when both Lufthansa and Air France airlines denied him admission to their flights citing red alerts that had been issued by the Kenyan government over his intended trip

On 6 January 2020, Kenyan high court Judge Justice Weldon Korir ordered the government to facilitate the entry of Miguna back to the country, and that the registrar should release Miguna's Kenyan passport which was currently under custody.

An order be and is hereby issued, that pending and following the inter-parties hearing of the Application, compelling the Respondents to facilitate entry of the Petitioner into Kenya on January 7, 2020 or any other date appointed by the Petitioner on the basis of his identification through the use of his National Identity Card, or his Kenya Passport in the form and state it was delivered by the Respondents to the High Court Registry pursuant to this Court's Order

— Justice Weldon Korir.

Kenyan Justice John Mativo summoned the Kenyan Attorney General Mr Paul Kihara Kariuki to appear in court on 13 January 2020, to explain why orders allowing lawyer Miguna Miguna's return to Kenya had not been obeyed. The Attorney General did not appear in court and instead sent a team of lawyers to appear in court on his behalf, prompting protest from Miguna Miguna's lawyers, who said that the state was treating the matter casually.

== Works ==
- Disgraceful Osgoode and Other Essays. Toronto: Av Publications. 1994. ISBN 0969822812.
- Songs of Fire. Toronto: Av Publications. 1994. OCLC 31781822.
- Afrika's Volcanic Song. Toronto: Av Publications. 1995. ISBN 0969822820.
- Toes Have Tales. Toronto: Av Publications. 1995. ISBN 0969822839.
- Peeling Back the Mask: A Quest for Justice in Kenya. London: Gilgamesh Africa. 2012. ISBN 9781908531216.
- Kidneys for the King: Deforming the Status Quo in Kenya. Ontario: Integrity Books. 2013. ISBN 9780991796205.
- Treason: The Case Against Tyrants & Renegades. Ontario: Integrity Books. 2019. ISBN 9780991796229.
