= Shakeel Shabbir =

Kenyan politician

Honourable Shakeel Shabbir MP

Member of the Kenyan Parliament
- Incumbent
- Assumed office January 2008
- Preceded by: Gor Sunguh
- Constituency: Kisumu Town East

Lord Mayor of Kisumu
- In office 2000–2002

Personal details
- Born: 1 January 1957 (age 69) Kisumu, Kenya
- Party: ODM
- Children: 4
- Education: Middlesex Polytechnic (Dip); Henley Mgmt. College (MBA)

Shakeel Shabbir Ahmed (born 1953 in Kisumu) is a Kenyan politician. He belongs to the Orange Democratic Movement and was elected to represent the Kisumu Town East Constituency in the National Assembly of Kenya since the 2007 Kenyan parliamentary election.

He went to the Nairobi School and graduated in 1971. He then went to Makerere University in Uganda, but left after only one year's studies to join Middlesex Polytechnic in London, where he received a Diploma in Accountancy and later bachelor's degree in Business studies and he received the Master of Business Administration from the Henley Management College and later on did the Masters in political science at Maseno University. Shakeel Shabbir Ahmed has been the chairman of New Nyanza Provincial General Hospital for eleven years and been in health management for the last thirty years.
