= William Odongo Omamo =

Kenyan politician

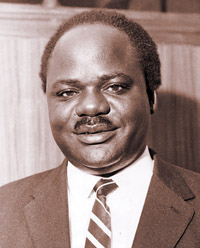
- Omamo in 1982
- Born: 27 March 1928; Bondo, Kenya Colony
- Died: 27 April 2010 (aged 82)
- Burial place: Nyambarimba House, Utonga Bay, Bondo
- Education: Maranda Sector School; Maseno College
- Alma mater: Punjab Agricultural College (BS)
- Occupations: Politician, farmer, college principal
- Organization: Egerton College
- Political party: KANU; NDP
- Spouse: Joyce Acholla; Anne Audia
- Children: 16, including Raychelle Omamo

Member of Parliament for Muhoroni Constituency
- In office 1997 – 2002
- Preceded by: Justus Aloo Ogeka
- Succeeded by: Patrick Ayiecho Olweny

Minister of Agriculture
- In office 1984 – 1987
- Preceded by: Munyua Waiyaki
- Succeeded by: Simeon Nyachae

Member of Parliament for Bondo Constituency
- In office 1980 – 1988
- Preceded by: John Hezekiah Ougo
- Succeeded by: Gilbert Paul Oluoch
- In office 1969 – 1974
- Preceded by: Jaramogi Oginga Odinga
- Succeeded by: John Hezekiah Ougo

William Odongo Omamo (27 March 1928 in Bondo, Kenya Colony – 27 April 2010) was a Kenyan politician. He was a minister for Agriculture, Minister for Environment and Natural Resources and a member of parliament for the Bondo Constituency and Muhoroni Constituency. Omamo had two wives, Joyce Acholla and Anne Audia, and 16 children. One of the most prominent is Raychelle Omamo, a former Law Society of Kenya chairperson and former ambassador to France who was selected as Cabinet Secretary of Defence in April 2013.

Omamo was also a large-scale farmer in Bondo and Muhoroni. He farmed many different crops, but was most noted for operating the largest privately owned sugar plantation in Kenya. After Kenya gained independence he became the first African principal of Egerton College, which has since become a university.

== Early life ==
Omamo was born on 27 March 1928, in Bondo (then ruled as part of the British Kenya Colony) in a family of eight children, two boys and six girls. His father married eight other women and had scores of children. He went to Maranda Sector School, five kilometres from his home, in 1936. He once described his first day in school as follows: "I was half naked, with only a goat skin strip to cover the private parts and buttocks."

By the time Omamo finished secondary school at Maseno College, he had developed a passion for agriculture. He then received a scholarship to study in India in 1951. He graduated from the Punjab Agricultural College in 1955 with a Bachelor of Science in Agriculture. He also earned a Doctorate, and studied at Oregon State University.

== Political career ==
Omamo's career in politics began in 1969 and he successfully vied for the Bondo seat. It was previously Jaramogi Oginga Odinga’s, but after falling out with the administration in place he was detained just before the elections. Omamo's political career spanned almost four decades and saw him represent the Bondo and Muhoroni constituencies in Kenya. Starting on 10 August 1982, he was Minister for Environment and Natural Resources. Omamo also served as Minister for; Agriculture and Livestock development and Science and Technology. Omamo and Odinga partook in a political rivalry that would last for years. They vied for the support of the people of Bondo, and to a lesser extent Muhoroni. Omamo's last public post came when former President Moi appointed him to chair a commission in the late 1980s.

== Death and legacy ==
After falling ill in the mid 2000s, Omamo died from a long standing illness at the age of 82 on 27 April 2010. His funeral was attended by family and friends, which included Raila Odinga, Kalonzo Musyoka, and Mwai Kibaki, the then prime minister, vice president and president respectively. He was buried at his estate in Utonga Bay at Nyambarimba house, just outside Bondo.

Omamo is remembered as one of Kenya's most illustrious politicians, as well as for his bulky frame and sense of humour. His family included two wives, 16 children and many grandchildren, a number of which are professionals in law and medicine.
