= David William Cohen =

Historical anthropologist

David William Cohen (born 2 June 1943) is emeritus Professor of History and Anthropology at the University of Michigan. He specializes in East Africa (Kenya, Uganda) and is a leader in the emerging field of historical anthropology. He is Honorary Research Fellow, Archive and Public Culture Initiative, University of Cape Town.

Cohen received his PhD from the University of London. He taught at Johns Hopkins University, and was later professor of anthropology and history and director of the Program of African Studies at Northwestern University.

With E. S. Atieno Odhiambo, he wrote on the multiple investigations into the 1990 disappearance and death of Kenya's Foreign Minister, Robert Ouko.

== Selected works ==
=== Books ===
- The Historical Tradition of Busoga: Mukama and Kintu (Oxford: Clarendon, 1972).
- Neither Slave Nor Free: The Freedmen of African Descent in the Slave Societies of the New World, edited with Jack P. Greene, with an introduction by David William Cohen and Jack P. Greene (Baltimore: The Johns Hopkins University Press, 1972).
- Womunafu's Bunafu: A Study of Authority in a Nineteenth Century African Community (Princeton: Princeton University Press, 1977). Repr. New York: ACLS History E-Book, 2004.
- Towards a Reconstructed Past: Historical Texts from Busoga, Uganda (London: The British Academy and Oxford University Press, 1986).
- Siaya: A Historical Anthropology of an African Landscape (London: James Currey; Nairobi: Heinemann Kenya; Athens, Ohio: Ohio University Press, 1989), with E. S. Atieno Odhiambo.
- Burying SM: The Politics of Knowledge and the Sociology of Power in Africa (Portsmouth, New Hampshire: Heinemann; London: James Currey, 1992), with E. S. Atieno Odhiambo.
- The Combing of History (Chicago: University of Chicago Press, 1994).
- The Risks of Knowledge: Investigations into the Death of the Hon. Minister John Robert Ouko in Kenya, 1990 (Oxford, Ohio: Ohio University Press; 2004), with E. S. Atieno Odhiambo.
- African Words, African Voices: Critical Practices in Oral History (Bloomington, IN: Indiana University Press, 2001), ed. with Luise White and Stephan F. Miescher.

=== Articles ===
- “The Pursuits of Anthrohistory: Formation against Formation,” in Edward Murphy, David William Cohen, Chandra Bhimull, Fernando Coronil, Monica E.Patterson, and Julie Skurski, eds., Anthrohistory: Unsettling Knowledge, Questioning Discipline(Ann Arbor: University of Michigan Press, 2010), 11–33.
- “Memories of Things Future: Future Effects in “The Production of History,” in Sebastian Jobs and Alf Lüdtke, eds., Unsettling History: Archiving and Narrating in Historiography(Frankfurt: Campus Verlag, 2010), 29–48.
- “Unsettled Stories and Inadequate Metaphors: The Movement to Historical Anthropology,” in Eric Tagliacozzo and Andrew Wilford, eds., CLIO/ANTHROPOS: Exploring the Boundaries between History and Anthropology (Stanford, CA: Stanford University Press, 2009), 273–94.
- “The Strange Career of the African Voice,” in Denis Laborde, ed., Désirs d’histoire: Politique, mémoire, identité (Paris: L’Harmattan, 2009), 203–19. “Constituting Sacred Spaces, Producing Heretical Knowledge,” with Michael Kennedy, introduction to Responsibility in Crisis: Knowledge Politics and Global Publics (Ann Arbor: Scholarly Publishing Office, University of Michigan Library, 2004), edited, with Michael Kennedy.
- “Sacred Spaces and Heretical Knowledge: National Universities and Global Publics,” a position paper, with Michael Kennedy and Kathleen Canning, Responsibility in Crisis: Knowledge Politics and Global Publics (Ann Arbor: Scholarly Publishing Office, University of Michigan Library, 2004), edited, with Michael Kennedy.
- “The Uncertainty of Africa in an Age of Certainty,” in Responsibility in Crisis: Knowledge Politics and Global Publics (Ann Arbor: Scholarly Publishing Office, University of Michigan Library, 2004), edited, with Michael Kennedy. “The Fate of Documentation: The Ethics of Property in the Work of Visual Representation,” Kronos(Special Issue: Visual History), 27, November, 2001, 293–303.
- “Review: Richard Price, The Convict and the Colonel,” HistorischeAnthropologie, 9, 3, 2001, 478–81. Trans. Alf Luedtke. “Introduction: Voices, Words, and African History,” (with Stephan F. Miescher and LuiseWhite), in Luise White, Stephan F. Miescher, and David William Cohen, eds., African Words, African Voices: Critical Practices in Oral History(Bloomington, IN: Indiana University Press, 2001), 1-27.
- “In a Nation of White Cars. .. One White Car, or ‘A White Car,’ Becomes a Truth,” in Luise White, Stephan F.Miescher, and David William Cohen, eds., AfricanWords, African Voices: Critical Practices in Oral History (Bloomington, IN: Indiana University Press, 2001), 264-80.
- “Robert Ouko’s Pain: The Negotiation of a ‘State of Mind’,” inMichael S. Roth and Charles G. Salas, eds., Disturbing Remains: Memory, History, and Crisis in the Twentieth Century (Los Angeles: Getty Research Institute, 2001), 17-36.
- “African Historians and African Voices: Bethwell Allan Ogot and the Changing Authority of the ‘African Voice’,” in E. S. Atieno Odhiambo, ed., African Historians and African Voices: Essays present to Professor Bethwell Allan Ogot (Basel: P. Schlettwein, 2001),47-55.
- “Reading the Minister’s Remains: Investigations into the Death of the Honourable Minister John Robert Ouko in Kenya, February 1990,” with E. S.Atieno Odhiambo, in Della Pollock, ed., Exceptional Spaces: Essays in Performance and History (Chapel Hill, NC: University of North Carolina Press, 1998), 77–97.
- “Further Thoughts on the Production of History,” in Gerald Sider and Gavin Smith, eds., Between History and Histories: The Making of Silences and Commemorations(Toronto: University of Toronto Press,1997), 300–310.
- “Silences of the Living, Orations of the Dead: The Struggle in Kenya for S. M. Otieno’s Body, 20 December 1986 to 23 May 1987,” with E. S.Atieno Odhiambo, in Gerald Sider and Gavin Smith, eds., Between History and Histories: The Making of Silences and Commemorations (Toronto: University of Toronto Press, 1997), 180–98.
- “The Luo of Western Kenya,1500-1800,” with E. S. Atieno Odhiambo, in E. J. Alagoa, ed., Oral Tradition and Oral History in Africa and the Diaspora: Theory and Practice(Lagos, Nigeria: Centre for Black and African Arts and Civilization, The National Library Press, 1990 [copyright],1997? [published].
- “Historical anthropology: Discerning the rules of the game,” FOCAAL, 26/27, (1996), 65–7.
- "Reading the Minister's Remains: Investigations into the Death of the Honourable Minister John Robert Ouko in Kenya, February, 1990," Passages, 7, 1994, 14–18.
- "The Constitution of International Expertise," ii: The Journal of the International Institute, Winter, 1994. 6, 8.
- "The Cwezi Cult," Journal of African History, ix, 4 (1968), 651–57.
- "Luo History Without Court Chronicles," Journal of African History, ix, 3 (1968), 480–82.
- "A Survey of Interlacustrine Chronology," Journal of African History, xi, 2 (1970), 177–201.
- "Agenda for African Economic History," The Journal of Economic History, xxxi, 1 (March, 1971), 208–21.
- "Precolonial History as the History of Society," African Studies Review, 17, 2, (1974), 467–72.
- "Trends in African Historical Studies," American Anthropologist, 80 (1978), 101–105.
- “The Political Transformation of Northern Busoga: 1600-1900," Cahiers d'Études africaines, 23 (3–4), 87-88 (1982), 465–88.
- "Ayany, Malo, and Ogot: Historians in Search of a Luo Nation," with E. S. Atieno Odhiambo, Cahiers d'Etudes Africaines, 107–108, xxcii-3-4, 1987, 269–286.
- "The Cultural Topography of a `Bantu Borderland': Busoga, 1500-1850," Journal of African History, 29, 1, 1988, 57–79.
- "The Undefining of Oral Tradition," Ethnohistory, 36, 1, Winter, 1989, 9–18.
- "Luo Camps in Seventeenth Century Eastern Uganda: The Use of Migration Tradition in the Reconstruction of Culture," SUGIA: Sprache und Geschichte in Afrika, 5 (1983), 145–75.
- "Natur und Kampf--Uberfluss und Armut in der Viktoriasee-Region in Afrika von 1880 bis zur Gegenwart," SOWI: Sozialwissenschaftliche Informationen fur Unterricht und Studium, 14, 1 (March) 1985, 10–22.

=== Other ===
He has also compiled

- Selected Texts, Busoga Traditional History, 3 vols., limited xerox and bound edition deposited in Africana collections in North America, Europe, and Africa: 1969, 1970, 1973)

and written the sections

- "The River-Lake Nilotes from the Fifteenth to the Nineteenth Century," Zamani: A Survey of East African History, eds. B. A. Ogot and J. A. Kieran (Nairobi and New York: Longmans, New Edition, ed. B. A. Ogot, (Nairobi: Longmans, 1974).

and

- "Peoples and States of the Great Lakes Region," in J. F. A. Ajayi, ed., General History of Africa, VI: Africa in the Nineteenth Century until the 1880s (London: Heinemann; Berkeley: University of California Press, 1989), 270–93).1968);

He also contributed chapters to many collected works, as well as written a number of essays and books reviews.
