= Nicholas Biwott =

Kenyan politician (1944–2017)

Nicholas Biwott Kipyator
- Born: Kiprono; 22 February 1940; Chebior village, Kerio, Kenya Colony
- Died: 11 July 2017 (aged 77); Nairobi, Kenya
- Resting place: Kaptarakwa, Keiyo
- Other name: Kiprono Kipyator
- Education: University of Melbourne
- Occupations: Civil servant; Member of Parliament; Government minister
- Years active: 1960–2017
- Employer: Government of Kenya
- Known for: Public Service, Development, Philanthropy

Nicholas Kipyator Kiprono arap Biwott, EGH, (22 February 1940 – 11 July 2017) also known as the "Total Man" was a Kenyan businessman, politician, and philanthropist, who worked in the governments of the fathers of Kenyan independence, Jomo Kenyatta and Daniel arap Moi. He held eight senior civil servant and ministerial positions that included Minister of State (1979–82), Minister of Energy (1984-1985, 1990), Minister of East African and Regional Co-operation (1998–99) and Minister of Regional Development, Science, and Technology (1982).

Biwott was widely regarded as one of the most powerful and competent ministers of president Moi's government. He was also at the forefront of efforts to deepen regional cooperation. Former president Uhuru Kenyatta eulogised Biwott as a "patriot and diligent leader, who spent decades building schools and hospitals and spearheading every other kind of development including marketing Kenya abroad".

== Early life & Education ==
Biwott was born in Tot, Chebior village, Elgeyo-Marakwet District in the Rift Valley Province of British Kenya, on 22 February 1940 to Maria Soti and Joseph Cheserem Soti, a market trader and cattle herder in Eldoret. He attended Tambach Intermediate School from 1951 to 1954, after which he joined Kapsabet High School.

After finishing secondary school in 1959, Biwott began working at the Department of Information in Eldoretafter which he published the Kalenjin monthly newsletter with Kendagor Bett.

He attended the University of Melbourne, Australia, from 1962 to 1964, where he earned a Bachelor of Arts degree in Economics and Political Science, as well as a Diploma in Public Administration.

Biwott then served as a District Officer in Nkubu in the South Imenti Division of Meru District from 1964 to 1965, becoming one of the first Kenyans to serve in a senior administrative role when Kenya attained independence, returning to the University of Melbourne in 1966 to study for a master's degree in Economics under a Commonwealth scholarship. In his autobiography A Moving Horizon (chapter 2, page 31), Ambassador Francis Muthaura recalls being inspired by Biwott when he saw him as a young district officer in post-independence Kenya, Among the other figures Muthaura highlights from this era is Eliud Mahihu, under whom Biwott served. Mahihu was the first African provincial commissioner of Eastern Province and later of Coast Province during the regime of Kenya's first president, Jomo Kenyatta. A key ally in the Kenyatta administration, he was present at the president's death in 1978 and played a crucial role in the transition of power to Daniel arap Moi.

During his studies in Australia, Biwott met his Dutch-Australian wife, Hannie Biwott, whom he married in 1965 and with whom he had two children; they remained married until he died in 2017. Biwott had five children from relationships outside his marriage. Details of the parentage of his children, which had previously been the subject of speculation, were clarified following his death through his will, which was made public and published in local dailies.

== Political career ==
Biwott was a member of parliament for 28 years. In 1974, he ran unsuccessfully as a prospective MP for the Keiyo South Constituency. At the next election (1979), he was successful, standing on KANU ticket in Keiyo-Marakwet, retaining the seat in 1983 and 1988. In 1992, 1997, and 2002 he was elected the MP for Keiyo South Constituency. In the Parliamentary elections held on 27 December 2007, running on a KANU ticket, he lost his seat to Jackson Kiptanui Arap Kamai of the Orange Democratic Party (ODM). The ODM swept to victory in all but one of KANU's seats on the Rift Valley.

Following the 2002 election, Biwott served on the Devolution Committee of the Constitution of Kenya Review Commission. Biwott was the only Member of Parliament who abstained on the Constitutional Referendum held in 2005, stating that the Draft Constitution 'would divide the country along ethnic lines'. The draft Constitution was rejected at the Referendum.

In 2005, Biwott contested for the leadership of the Kenya African National Union (KANU), the former ruling party founded by the late Jomo Kenyatta, but lost the post to his son Uhuru Kenyatta following a decision by the Kenyan High Court.

== Service in government of Kenya ==
During his ministerial career, Nicholas Biwott held several senior portfolios, including Energy, Tourism and Wildlife and Regional Development. His tenure coincided with a period of major state-led infrastructure expansion and increased international engagement, particularly in energy policy and regional development initiatives. He was regarded as one of the most influential figures within government during the 1980s and 1990s.

=== District Officer ===
Biwott entered government service in 1965 as the District Officer, in South Imenti and Tharaka, Meru District (January 1965–66). As District Officer Biwott instituted, on a 'harambee' basis, community fundraising programmes to aid the development of local irrigation projects and roads, to build a health centre at Nkwene and schools at Nkubu and Kanyakine, develop employment at the Igoji quarries and promote the planting of coffee and tea. He was also actively involved in the resettlement of previously European owned land through the 'Land Transfer' programme, part of the 'Million Acres' scheme, and played a central role in the rehabilitation of the Mau Mau, many of whom still remained in the Mau Forest four years after the end of the 'Emergency', helping to persuade them to give up violence and organising the resettlement of many on to their own land.

=== Ministry of Agriculture ===
Having completed his master's degree in Australia in 1968, Nicholas Biwott returned to public service in the Ministry of Agriculture, GOK, Personal Assistant to Minister Bruce MacKenzie (1968–70). He coordinated cereal production, the marketing of cereal crops and the management of the Ministry's fertiliser policy, and helped develop research into new strains of wheat and maize more suited to the growing conditions in Kenya. He played a similar co-ordinating role for the Ministry's work with the East African Council of Ministers (MacKenzie was also a member of the council), guiding Kenya's policy in the region in the development of ports, railways and the East African Airways.

=== Treasury ===
In 1971 Nicholas Biwott moved to the Treasury as Senior Secretary under the Minister of Finance and Economic Planning, Mwai Kibaki. In 1972, he created and headed the External Aid Division and technical assistance program dealing with external resources, bringing in experts and arranging cultural exchanges. Notably, he helped facilitate the establishment of the French School in Nairobi (now called the Lycee Denis Diderot), the French Cultural Centre with the Alliance de Francais, and the German Friederich Ebert Stiftung Foundation in co-operation with the Goethe Institut.

=== Ministry of Home Affairs ===
In late 1978, Nicholas Biwott transferred to the Ministry of Home Affairs on the personal recommendation of President Kenyatta to work with his vice-president and the Minister of Home Affairs, Daniel arap Moi.

In 1974, Biwott stood as a candidate for the Keiyo South constituency in the general election of that year but was narrowly defeated.

Following the 1974 election, Nicholas Biwott was recalled to the Ministry of Home Affairs as Under Secretary (1974–78) to Minister Daniel arap Moi, Kenya's vice-president. With the ageing President Kenyatta unable to fulfil all the functions of the presidency, Moi took a leading role in the East African region with the result that Nicholas Biwott spent much of the next four years dealing with the Organisation of African Unity, the Commonwealth, the 'non-aligned' states and promoting the 'good neighbourliness' policy with states bordering Kenya.

Kenyatta's death in 1978 saw Daniel arap Moi elevated to the presidency and Nicholas Biwott promoted to Deputy Permanent Secretary in the Office of the President (1978–79).

=== Minister of State ===
Following the election of 1979 (in which he was elected Member of Parliament for 1979 Keiyo South election, a seat he retained until December 2007), Nicholas Biwott returned to the Office of the President but now promoted to Minister of State (1979–82) with responsibility for science and technology, cabinet affairs, land settlement, and immigration.

Under his leadership the Kenya Medical Research Institute (KEMRI) was established in the same year to carry out health science research in Kenya. KEMRI continues its work as "a leading centre of excellence in the promotion of quality health").

=== Minister of Regional Development, Science and Technology ===
In September 1982, he was appointed Minister of Regional Development, Science, and Technology. Learning from examples of other regional development policies, notably in Australia and Tennessee in the US, he created two regional development authorities, the Lake Basin Development Authority and the Kerio Valley Development Authority.

=== Minister of Energy ===
In September 1983, Nicholas Biwott was made Minister of Energy and Regional Development and in March 1988 (following a reorganisation of ministry portfolios) he became Minister of Energy, a post he held until January 1991.

Over the next seven years, he was instrumental in establishing the National Oil Corporation, the building of National Oil storage facilities near Nairobi and connecting them to the Mombasa refinery, and extending the pipeline from Nairobi to Kisumu and Eldoret. This period that saw rapid advances in efforts to improve Kenya's electricity supply and delivery with a rural electrification programme, work beginning on the Sondu Miriu Dam, and the completions of the Masinga Multi Purpose Dam, the Kiambere Hydro Electric Dam and the Turkwell Hydro Electric Multi Purpose Dam.

=== Minister of East African and Regional Co-operation ===
Although he remained a member of parliament, Biwott held no position in the Government of Kenya from 1991 until he re-entered government as Minister of State in the Office of the President of East Africa in 1997. In January 1998, he established and was appointed Minister of the new Ministry of East African and Regional Co-operation (1998–99).

Nicholas Biwott played a central role in COMESA – the Common Market for East and Central Africa, co-ordinating with COMESA partner Ministers legislation for an East African Road network, legislation for an East African Legislative Assembly, and becoming Chairman of both COMESA and of the East Africa Council of Ministers.

=== Minister of Trade and Industry, Tourism and East African Cooperation ===
In September 1999, Biwott's ministerial portfolio was expanded when he became Minister of Trade and Industry, Tourism, and East African Cooperation (1999–2001), a post he held for the next three years during which he established a Tourist Trust Fund with the European Union, set up the Tourist Police and re-introduced the East Africa Safari Rallies.

Biwott's promotion of Kenyan tourism met with some praise. He was variously described as "the hardest working minister of tourism Kenya has ever had" and as "the best minister of tourism in 25 years".

In May 2001, (following a further reorganisation of Ministry responsibilities) Nicholas Biwott continued as the Minister of Trade and Industry and East African Tourism (2001–02). Over the next eighteen months he established the Small Medium Trade Trust Fund with the European Union, introduced an Intellectual Property bill which was passed as an Act of Parliament, accomplished a free trade area with COMESA, established the Africa Trade Insurance Agency to cover foreign investments against political risk, and served as Chairman of the African Caribbean Pacific Group (ACP) at the World Trade Organization. The resulting Kenya's Industrial Property Act of 2001 provided the statutory framework for the protection of patents, industrial designs and utility models, and established the Kenya Industrial Property Institute to oversee registration, regulation and technology transfer. The legislation aligned Kenya’s industrial property regime with international standards, including the TRIPS Agreement, and was intended to support local innovation while regulating the acquisition and use of foreign technology.

== Businessman ==
Biwott led an active business life and was regarded as one of Kenya's most successful entrepreneurs.

As a teenager in the late 1950s, Biwott worked alongside his father who had established a successful fruit and vegetable business in Eldoret. The young Biwott also borrowed small amounts of money from a local bank with which to expand his own business sideline selling meat products and eggs. Nicholas Biwott continued to expand his own business and in the late 1960s formed ABC Foods selling food and animal feed products.

Within a few years, Nicholas Biwott was able to invest in farms and businesses, taking advantage of the post-independence banking policies at the time by which Kenyans were granted loans on favourable terms. In 1969, aged 29, Biwott purchased the Eldoret Town International Harvester (IH) dealership (now FMD trading as Lima Ltd). He also purchased a dairy farm in the same year, started an importer exporter business in 1972, purchased two wheat farms in 1974, invested in the sole agency for IH in Kenya for agricultural tractors and implements in 1975, and purchased a local air operator in 1977 (now Air Kenya).Biwott's business philosophy of purchasing small or failing businesses, investing and re-investing in them over many years, appears to have paid dividends. Over time, his portfolio diversified across agribusiness, logistics/aviation and food manufacturing, often growing acquired businesses into long-term operating companies.

Biwott's businesses had thousands of staff across Kenya. One company which he was the major shareholder was listed among Kenya's top 10 corporate taxpayers.

== Philanthropy ==
Alongside his political career, Biwott was involved in a range of philanthropic and community development initiatives, particularly in education and healthcare. He established and supported several educational institutions, including secondary schools and bursary programmes aimed at increasing access to education in Elgeyo-Marakwet and surrounding regions. In 2008, he established the Mbegu Trust 'to develop education and opportunity in Kenya'. He took an active role in particularly the education of girls, through the building of numerous schools such as the Maria Soti Educational Centre a model school for girls from all backgrounds built as a tribute to his mother, as well as the Biwott Secondary School.

Biwott also played an active role in raising funds for the building of many other colleges and educational projects, and was the founder and patron of the Keiyo South Education Foundation that provides bursaries to needy students for primary and secondary education.

Health and Medical Services

Nicholas Biwott led the development of multiple health and medical service projects, including at least two sub-district hospitals, three health centres and eight dispensaries.

For many years, he also worked for and supported the National Fund for the Disabled of Kenya, which from 1980 he was a founding member of and trustee of the Management Committee, and the Advocacy, Publicity and Fundraising Committee, and ultimately its chairman.

== Investigations and Legal Matters ==
During the early 1990s, Biwott was questioned in connection with investigations into the death of Foreign Affairs Minister Robert Ouko, however there was no criminal charges brought against him following police investigations. Biwott later pursued and won defamation cases against publishers and media organisations that linked him to the murder.

His supporters maintain that the allegations, none of which have ever been proven or supported by evidence, arose from the campaign at the time to introduce multi-party democracy in Kenya coupled with Biwott's association with President Moi. Biwott was named as a person of interest by Scotland Yard detective John Troon in his final report on the 1990 murder of Kenya's Foreign Affairs Minister Robert Ouko. Troon's basis for naming Biwott in his final report on the Ouko murder was based on statements by two witnesses: Marianne Brinner-Mattern and Dominico Airgahi. The testimony of these witnesses has since come under scrutiny and discredited.

Marianne Brinner-Mattern and Dominico Airgahi were directors of a company known as ‘BAK Group’. In 1987, ‘BAK Group’ had been awarded a contract by the Kenyan Government to revamp a Molasses plant in Kisumu, Kenya. The contract was terminated before Ouko’s death because of the company’s failure to raise bilateral funding and to conduct an agreed-upon feasibility study. The study was subsequently awarded to US company F.C. Schaffer and Associates, Inc, a firm specializsing in agro-industrial projects, which was instructed by the Kenyan Ministry of Industry to carry out the work. This was and paid for by the funded through a US Trade and Development Grant administered via the US Embassy and USAID under the leadership of Dalmas Otieno, the then Minister of Industry since assuming the ministry from Dr Robert Ouko. F.C. Schafer had been directly involved in about 700 agro-industrial projects in 45 countries with specific expertise in the design, building and management of sugar factories and sugar by-product facilities. In 1999, Madeleine Albright, the then US Secretary of State, presented Mr Francis Schaffer with an Award for Corporate Excellence.

Before Ouko’s murder, the ‘BAK Group’ were claiming $150,000 in damages from the Kenyan Government on the grounds of an unfair contract termination. After Ouko’s death, their damages claim on the Kenyan Government rose to $5.975 million. As it later emerged, while Airaghi and Briner-Mattern were dealing with the Kenya Government, Airaghi was on bail having been convicted of fraud and extortion by a court in Milan in 1987. Briner-Mattern had been a key witness in that court hearing; the Milanese judge presiding said of her witness testimony that it was best to draw a “compassionate veil” over her statements, further commenting on her “unreliability” as a witness.

Ten government officials, including Biwott, were held in police custody for questioning for two weeks in November 1991, following a call by Scotland Yard detective John Troon for further investigations to assess the credibility of allegations made by the directors of BAK Group but a Kenyan Police investigation concluded that there was no 'evidence to support the allegations that Biwott was involved in the disappearance and subsequent death of the late minister Dr. Robert John Ouko'.

In December 2003, Biwott issued a formal complaint against New Scotland Yard through his lawyer on the basis that Troon's investigation was 'fundamentally flawed and, in many cases erroneous' and called on New Scotland Yard 'to investigate Troon and to issue an apology citing, among other concerns, that entities referred to as BAK Group SA International Consultants and BAK Group Briner & Partner did not exist, and that the Kenyan Government’s molasses project file had not been reviewed. The request was ultimately turned down in December 2004 by the Metropolitan Police as the original investigation 'did not involve a citizen of the United Kingdom, potential suspect, or even witnesses', and because 'the resources of the Metropolitan Police are limited'. Another reason given for the refusal by the Metropolitan Police to review the case was that the Kenyan Parliamentary Select Committee (PSC) was investigating the death of Dr Robert Ouko and that it was 'open to Mr Biwott to make any representations he wishes to that Inquiry'.

The Select Committee's proceedings, however, were abruptly terminated as Nicholas Biwott began to give his testimony and he was not permitted to table evidence or give evidence as he requested. The PSC led by Gor Sunguh would not allow the cross-examination of witnesses by Nicholas Biwott’s lawyers. Some members of the Committee decided they could not continue serving on the Committee. Six members – Paul Muite, Mirugi Kariuki, Dr Abdulahi Ali, Njoki S. Ndung’u and Otieno Kajwang – resigned during its hearings. Four others left to take up other appointments. New members were appointed to the Committee. At the end there were 10 members, of which four did not sign Sungu’s report.

Parliament in 2005 refused to consider Sungu’s report. It was tabled again on December 8, 2010, but following debate it was not adopted by Parliament and was rejected by Members of parliament for being “shoddy” and for having been used “to settle political scores”.

=== Defamation ===
Biwott pursued several defamation cases in Kenyan courts relating to published allegations linking him to the murder of Robert Ouko. His case is reported to have contributed to the development of defamation law in Kenya. In 2000, High Court Judge Alnashir Visram awarded Mr Biwott a record damages of Sh30 million, the biggest settlement in a defamation case in Kenya . In his ruling Judge Visram said that he believed , “time is propitious to send a clear message to all those who libel others with impunity, and get away with ridiculously small awards, that courts of law will no longer condone their mischief”. Biwott was awarded the Sh30 million damages after he sued a British journalist, Chester Stern, and others for linking him to the Ouko murder in a book entitled 'Dr Iain West's Casebook'. Chester Stern and the book's publishers, Little Brown, stated that they would "vigorously defend" the action but ultimately they did not do so and the case was uncontested.

Judge Visram ruled that author and pathologist lain West and journalist Chester Stern, the book’s co-authors, pay KES 15 million in compensatory damages and another KES 15 million in exemplary damages. Bookpoint and Bookstop, popular Nairobi bookshops, also paid Biwott 10 million in damages for stocking copies of the book Dr Ian West's Casebook.

A number of local dailies were also sued by Biwott over the coverage of this defamatory story. In March of 2002, Kalamaka Ltd., the publisher of the People Daily newspaper, was found guilty of the “unmitigated and defenceless character assassination” of Mr. Biwott. Biwott was awarded Kshs 20 million in damages.

Biwott's case was referenced in 2005 in a defamation and libel case filed by former Chief Justice Evans Gicheru. Gicheru had sued Andrew Morton, author of a biography on the president "Moi -The making of an African statesman" and the publisher Michael O Mara Books.

== Death, memorial and funeral ==
On the morning of 11 July 2017, Biwott died of complications arising from kidney failure at the Nairobi hospital.

A memorial service was held at Milimani AIC on 18 July 2017. On the 20th of July, a second memorial service was held at the Maria Soti Girls Educational Centre Kaptarakwa, in Keiyo, Elgeyo/Marakwet County. Over 20,000 people attended his memorial services.

In the final speech of the funeral, President Uhuru Kenyatta eulogized the late Biwott as a "true patriot". "When the history of this country is written, it will include many men and women in this country who quietly but firmly and confidently are responsible for what Kenya is today – a sound country, a stable country with a growing economy. And Nicholas Biwott is one of those people."

Nicholas Biwott was buried in a wooden casket contrary to some misleading information that circulated in the Kenyan social media space prior to his burial, alleging that he would be buried in a gold coffin.

In May 2026, a biography titled Karnet: The Total Man: The Life and Times of Nicholas Kiprono Kipyatoor Araap Biwott, written by Barmoiben Kipkemoi Araap Korir, was published. The book examines the life, career, and legacy of Nicholas Biwott.
