= Grace Onyango =

Kenyan politician (1924–2023)

Mayor of Kisumu
- In office 1 April 1965 – 1969
- Preceded by: Mathias P. Ondiek
- Constituency: Member of Parliament for Kisumu

Personal details
- Born: 26 June 1924 Sakwa, Nyanza Province, Kenya Colony
- Died: 8 March 2023 (aged 98) Kisumu, Kenya
- Party: Kenya People's Union (KPU); Kenya African National Union (KANU)
- Spouse: Onyango Baridi
- Children: Paul Ramogi; Lynn Akwacha, Jean, Josephine Migadde, Mary, Xandae

Grace Monica Akech Onyango (26 June 1924 – 8 March 2023), popularly known as Nya'Bungu (Daughter of the Bush), was a Kenyan politician. She achieved several firsts in post-independence Kenyan politics, as the first female to climb up the ranks of the political system, defying cultural barriers. She was the first Kenyan female mayor, after she replaced Mathias Ondiek as the Mayor of Kisumu in 1965. She was also the first female Member of Parliament in post-independence Kenya after she was elected to represent Kisumu Town Constituency in 1969. In Parliament, Onyango was the first woman to sit in the speaker's chair as temporary deputy speaker, and served as Deputy Speaker from 1979 to 1984. Her political career ended after she lost her parliamentary seat in 1984. Onyango also served as the first female secretary-general of the Luo Union.

== Early life and education ==
Born in Sakwa, in Nyanza Province, as the second of nine children, Onyango went to Ng'iya Girls School. She then joined Vihiga Teachers Training College from where she graduated in 1955. She was posted back to her high school, Ng'iya Girls, as a teacher. Three years later, she was recalled to Vihiga Teachers Training College to work as a trainer.

== Political career ==
Onyango was elected councillor of Kaloleni Ward in Kisumu. After the death in office of Kisumu's Mayor Mathias Ondiek in 1965, she joined the race to replace him. There were originally two other women in the race but they both dropped out "because of the hostile environment and abuses from male competitors." That left Onyango as the only female candidate in a field with six opponents, all male. She was elected mayor of the city of Kisumu in 1965.

As mayor, Onyango fought for women's place in leadership and politics. She launched a policy where, if a serving male employee of the council died, his wife or a female relative would be employed to replace him. She advocated for this policy even at the top level, attending official functions with Phililia Olang, her predecessor's wife. She also Africanised Kisumu Town streets, naming them for key political leaders such as Jaramogi Oginga Odinga, Paul Mbuya, and Milton Obote.

In 1969, she ran for the Kisumu Town constituency parliamentary seat. All her opponents were male, and had significantly more financial resources than her. Her supporters coined the campaign slogan "Kura kwa Mama, Chakula kwa Khan" [Votes to Mama, Feeding at Khan's] meaning they would vote for her despite taking Remhat Khan's, her main challenger, money.

Onyango defeated Khan in the elections, marking the first time in post-independence politics that a woman had won a parliamentary seat in Kenya. Asked by a journalist if she would not be 'lost' being the only woman in Parliament, she retorted ""I have always worked fearlessly along with men. And how do you expect me to feel afraid working with them this time?"

=== Parliamentary career ===
Of her career as a parliamentarian, Onyango told The Standard in July 2018 that she "...was the minority in Parliament, standing up against 158 male MPs. But I dominated the debates". In one instance in November 1970, she asked Minister of State Mbiyu Koinange why the state had arrested a witchdoctor known as "Kajiwe" for oathing people at the Coast, but had not arrested those who organised oathing in Central Province the year before.

In 1975, Onyango was a member of the committee tasked with investigating the assassination of Josiah Mwangi Kariuki. When the committee chair, Elijah Mwangale tabled the report, she pointed out that it had been doctored at State House, by President Jomo Kenyatta prior to publication. She and another Member of Parliament, Martin Shikuku, had hidden a copy of the original report in Room 7 in Parliament. The original report contained the names of Mbiyu Koinange and Wanyoike Thungu, Jomo Kenyatta's aide and enforcer.

Onyango also successfully lobbied for the abolition of bicycle taxes. In her decade and a half in Parliament, a few other women were elected to the House. They included Dr. Phoebe Asiyo and Chelagat Mutai.

Onyango lost her parliamentary seat in 1983 to Robert Ouko, who would be later assassinated.

== Personal life and death ==
Onyango married a teacher and journalist, Onyango Baridi, who died in 1969, leaving her with six children: Paul Ramogi, Lynn Akwacha, Jean, Josephine Migadde, Mary and Xandae. She had 17 grandchildren and 11 great-grandchildren.

Onyango died on 8 March 2023, at the age of 98. The National assembly paid tribute to her and contributions were made to her funeral expenses.
