= Omamo =

Omamo is a surname. Notable people with the surname include:

- William Odongo Omamo (1928–2010), Kenyan politician
- Raychelle Omamo (born 1962), Kenyan lawyer and politician, daughter of William
