= Robert Ouko (politician) =

Kenyan politician

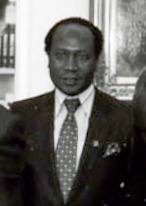
- Ouko in 1981

Minister for Foreign Affairs
- In office 1988–1990
- President: Daniel arap Moi
- Preceded by: Zachary Onyonka
- Succeeded by: Wilson Ndolo Ayah
- In office 1979–1983
- President: Daniel arap Moi
- Preceded by: Munyua Waiyaki
- Succeeded by: Elijah Mwangale

Member of Parliament
- In office 1979–1988
- Preceded by: Wycliffe Ayoki
- Succeeded by: Wilson Ndolo Ayah
- Constituency: Kisumu Rural

Member of Parliament
- In office 1988–1990
- Preceded by: Wilson Ndolo Ayah
- Succeeded by: Joab Henry Omino
- Constituency: Kisumu Town

Personal details
- Born: John Robert Ouko; 31 March 1931 Nyahera, Nyanza, British Kenya
- Died: 13 February 1990 (aged 58) Koru, Kenya
- Cause of death: Assassination
- Resting place: Koru
- Party: Kenya African National Union (KANU)
- Children: 8
- Education: Haile Selassie University; Makerere University; University of Nairobi
- Occupation: teacher, civil servant, politician

John Robert Ouko (31 March 1931 – c. 13 February 1990) was a Kenyan politician who served two spells as Foreign Minister of Kenya: from 1979 to 1983 and from 1988 to 1990. Ouko served in the government of Kenya from the colonial period through the presidencies of Jomo Kenyatta and Daniel arap Moi. He was a member of the National Assembly for Kisumu and a cabinet minister, rising to the post of Minister of Foreign Affairs and International Cooperation by 1990. On 13 February 1990, Ouko was found murdered in Muhoroni; the assassination, perhaps the most intriguing in Kenyan history, remains unsolved.

A report presented in parliament in 2010 states that the murder was carried out in one of then President Daniel arap Moi's official residences. It also called for further investigations into top officials who had been identified as suspects in earlier investigations, including Hezekiah Oyugi (Then Permanent Secretary in the Office of the President), Jonah Anguka, as well as one of Moi's closest allies, Nicholas Biwott, who denied responsibility. In late December 2010 the report was rejected by Parliament with 55 out of 59 voting against it on grounds that included internal disagreements within the committee itself, with four remaining members refusing to sign the report, and concerns raised by committee member Amina Abdalla, MP, that some recommendations were not supported by the evidence received and that the committee “had problems with its accuracy

== Early Life and Education ==
John Robert Ouko was born in 1931 in Nyahera, in the then Central Kavirondo District of Nyanza Province. He attended to Ogada Primary School and Nyang’ori School. He later joined the Siriba Teachers Training College. He worked as a primary school teacher. In 1955, he landed a job as the revenue officer of Kisii District. In 1958, he joined the Haile Selassie University in Addis Ababa, Ethiopia, graduating in 1962 with a degree in Public Administration, Economics and Political Science. He then went to Makerere University in Uganda for a diploma in International Relations and Diplomacy.

At the time of his death, he was almost done with his doctoral thesis, for which he was studying at the University of Nairobi. Despite being known as 'Dr. Ouko', he held only an honorary degree received in 1971 from the Pacific Lutheran University in Seattle.

== Political Life ==
Shortly before Kenya's independence in 1963, he worked as an Assistant Secretary in the office of the Governor. He was later posted as the Permanent Secretary in the Ministry of Works. After the East African Community collapsed in 1977, Ouko became a nominated member in the Kenyan parliament and appointed as the Minister for Economic Planning and Community Affairs.

He was elected to the parliament at the 1979 general elections for Kisumu Rural Constituency and retained his seat at the 1983 elections. For the 1988 elections he moved to Kisumu Town Constituency (later split to Kisumu Town West and Kisumu Town East constituencies), and was re-elected to the parliament. Ouko was a member of KANU, the only legally operating party at the time.

== Disappearance and Death ==
On 27 January 1990, Ouko, then Minister of Foreign Affairs, left Nairobi as part of a delegation of 83 ministers and officials, among them president Daniel arap Moi, to attend a 'Prayer Breakfast' meeting in Washington DC. The delegation returned to Nairobi on 4 February. On 5 February, Ouko met with President Moi, the Japanese Ambassador, the Canadian High Commissioner, Bethuel Kiplagat (Permanent Secretary, Ministry of Foreign Affairs), and Hezekiah Oyugi (Permanent Secretary, Internal Security). Later that day, Ouko travelled to his country residence, a farm in Koru (some 300 km from Nairobi) near Kisumu, accompanied by his driver and a bodyguard.

On the night of 12/13 February 1990, Ouko disappeared from his Koru farm near Muhoroni. His housemaid Selina Were Ndalo testified that she "was awakened at about 3 am by a noise similar to a slammed door but sufficiently loud enough to startle her awake" and that she saw a white car turning at the bottom of the minister's driveway before driving off.

Francis Cheruyot, a telephonist at Songoh Office, near to the Koru farm, alleged to Detective Superintendent John Troon of Scotland Yard (see below) that on Tuesday 13 February 1990, at about 6 am, he was on duty on the post office telephone switchboard when he saw Hezekiah Oyugi "who was a passenger in a white car containing three other persons" drive past the post office on two occasions but Cheruyot would not make a written statement to this effect. Oyugi was subsequently unable to produce the daily log of his official car.

=== Body discovery ===
Ouko's body was found later in the day on 13 February at approximately 1 pm by a local herdsboy Joseph Shikuku (also named as 'Shikulu' and Shikuru' in both Troon's and other reports), at the foot of nearby Got Alila Hill, 2.8 km from Ouko's country home, but although he notified the local villagers of this (a fact supported by 'statements in support' given to Scotland Yard detectives by six other villagers) it was not reported to the police. Ouko's body was eventually 'officially' discovered on 16 February, following a police search.

=== Investigation ===
Forensic evidence suggested Ouko had been murdered, near where his body was found, killed by a single shot to the head, his right leg broken in two places and his body left partially burned. There was evidence that a gun had been discharged at the scene (although the bullet was never found). A "single caucasian hair" was also found "loosely associated with a partially burnt handkerchief found at the scene". Items including a gun, a torch, a diesel can and matches were found nearby. All of the items were subsequently identified as belonging to Ouko and, with the exception of the jerrycan, matches and torch, had usually been kept in his bedroom. News of the murder set off riots in Nairobi.

Initial police reports, which were affirmed by the then chief government pathologist Jason Kaviti, suggested that Ouko had committed suicide by lighting himself up and shooting himself, but it became known that Ouko had been murdered. The suicide theory seemed an absurd suggestion, hinting at a cover-up attempt. Public pressure led President Daniel arap Moi to ask British detectives from New Scotland Yard to investigate Ouko's death.

The following investigation by the Kenyan police was supported by the arrival on 21 February of Detective Superintendent John Troon of Scotland Yard's International Organised Crime Branch, accompanied by two other detectives and a Home Office forensic pathologist.

=== Troon's Theory ===
==== Family wrangles ====
Troon's initial investigations uncovered allegations of a serious and long-running row in the Ouko family that was testified to in witness statements by Ouko's wife Christabel, in the first two statements given by his sister Dorothy Randiak, and in the statements given by his brothers Barrack and Collins, his sister-in-law Esther Mbajah, the family doctor Joseph Olouch, and family friend Erik James Oyango.

Dorothy Randiak, in her first witness statement, cited the cause of the row: "In 1985 the following happened. Barrack was working as Deputy PC in Nakuru in the Rift Valley Province. From there he was transferred to Deputy Secretary at the Attorney generals office. He did not want this move and he blamed it on Robert [Ouko] because he had ambition to become Provincial Commissioner. Barrack discussed the move to try and prevent it but Robert done nothing about it because of reasons of which they both knew. This caused a lot of bitterness on Barrack's part against Robert but Robert had no bad feeling towards Barrack. The situation still exists. Barrack also influenced Collins which in turn caused him to show bitterness against Robert also. The bitterness of both these brothers was maintained throughout and remained until the time Robert disappeared".

In her second statement made to Troon on 27 March, Dorothy Randiak recounted that a family group photograph had been found in her mother's house in December 1989 in which the picture of her mother had been cut out and that Ouko had blamed his brother Collins for it. She stated also that Collins had told his mother "never to come to the house again and that if she did he would cut her to pieces".

Troon concluded in his 'Final Report' that, "To summarise the immediate family of Ouko, I am not satisfied that they have told me everything they know. There appears to be a shroud of fear surrounding the whole family which prevents them fully disclosing what I believe some of them must know".

Troon also received testimony from Mrs Ouko and Ouko's mistress Herine Violas Ogembo (see below) that shortly before Ouko was murdered threatening phone calls had been made to Mrs Ouko from a woman claiming to be Ouko's "second wife", and also to Miss Ogembo saying that Mrs Ouko knew of the relationship and wanted to kill her and her daughter. Ouko's relationship with Violas Ogembo, whom he had met in 1982 and with whom he had a daughter in 1983, "was apparently open and many of his close friends and colleagues knew of their association" and "at times he would take Miss Ogembo on official visits abroad or arrange her travel to meet him at selected venues". Mrs Ouko stated that she had only found out about the relationship 'during the latter part of 1989'. The woman making the phone calls was never identified. Ouko, according to the testimony of his sister Dorothy Randiak, thought that his brother Barrack "had fed the information in".

Witnesses also spoke of a dispute with local politicians and allegations of fraud in Kisumu Town Council.

Troon's investigation took a dramatic turn in mid March, as recorded in his 'Interim Report' submitted in July. In paragraphs 101 and 102 Troon stated that, 'On Saturday 17 March my colleague Detective Sergeant Lindsay received a telephone call to meet a person in the Imperial Hotel, Kisumu. Lindsay attended the venue and there met a person who identified himself as Professor Thomas A. Ogada, the Kenyan Ambassador to Switzerland', and that, 'Prof. Ogada informed Lindsay that he had been directed by His Excellency the President to hand over to the Scotland Yard Officers a sealed envelope which he had brought with him from Switzerland. In addition to the envelope, Prof. Ogada supplied details of two contacts in relation to the contents, one being Mrs Briner Mattern, the other being her advocate in Kenya Mr Frank Addly of Kaplan and Stratton Advocates, Nairobi'. No mention of President Moi's involvement was made in Troon's 'Final Report' submitted in August 1990.

==== Exchange with Biwott ====
In the course of Troon's investigation, a theory gained currency that there may have been an argument between Ouko and some government officials who included Nicholas Biwott, the then Kenya's Minister of Energy, during the trip to Washington following a supposed meeting by Ouko with President George H. W. Bush. Hoever Troon did accepted that the "factual basis" for the alleged row on the Washington trip was "somewhat tenuous" and based on "hearsay" President Bush’s diary records later obtained from the Bush Presidential Library showed no such private meeting occurred. Additional theories concerned a dispute over the cancellation of a project to build a molasses plant at Kisumu (in Ouko's constituency); and that Ouko was preparing a report on high-level political corruption in the Government of Kenya in relation to the Kisumu Molasses Project (which by implication named Biwott).

The basis for Troon's theory was thus allegations passed to Scotland Yard at the direction of President Daniel arap Moi and made by a Domenico Airaghi and a Marianne Briner-Mattern (who made a witness statement to Troon on 22 March 1990), directors of BAK International, a company based in Switzerland that had tendered to Ouko when he was Minister for Industry to restart the Molasses Project in Kisumu. Troon acknowledged in his report that the BAK directors “[had] very little, or no credibility in Kenya

The change in direction of Troon's investigation after receiving the file from the Kenyan ambassador to Switzerland on 17 March and Briner-Mattern's witness statement on 22 March is significant. All witness testimony prior to these dates had been based on the row in Ouko's family and allegations of corruption in the Kisumu Town Council. Ouko's sister, Dorothy Randiak, for example, made three statements to Troon, on 2, 27 March and 11 April. Only in her third statement, made some seven weeks after the investigation had begun did Dorothy Randiak testify regarding allegations surrounding the Kisumu Molasses Plant. Christabel Ouko, Ouko's wife, made four statements to Troon on 2 and 13 March and 5 and 8 April. It was only at the end of her fourth statement, again made some seven weeks after Troon began his investigation, that Mrs Ouko mentioned a possible dispute over the Kisumu Molasses Project.

Although Troon's final report to the Kenyan authorities, delivered in August 1990, was not conclusive it recommend further investigation into Ouko's murder.The report recommended enquiries into whether the allegations made by the BAK directors were credible, and further and in particular 'enquiries and further interviews' in respect of Hezekiah Oyugi, a Permanent Secretary in Kenya's Internal Security Department; James Omino, an MP for Kisumu Town and a political opponent of Ouko at the 1988 election; and Nicholas Biwott, the Minister for Energy.

However, Troon's investigation has since been criticised as being "fatally flawed" and has been further undermined by subsequent investigations and disclosures, not least amongst these that Airaghi had been convicted of attempted fraud and deception in Italy in 1987. In particular, Troon has been criticised for his reliance on the testimony of Domenico Airaghi and Marianne Briner-Mattern, his failure to investigate their background, his failure to read important evidence contained in the "Molasses File" (the Kenyan government's file recording all correspondence and minuted decisions relating to the project), and his failure to interview any US Government officials regarding the Washington trip.

In the absence of any direct evidence as to who was responsible for the murder of Ouko, Troon based his entire theory on the basis of establishing a motive for the killing.

=== The Washington trip ===
In relation to the Washington trip there appears to be no evidence of a dispute, or for the supposed cause of a dispute – that Ouko had met President Bush Snr. and not with President Moi and that this had caused a row between Ouko, Moi and Biwott. President Moi did meet with President Bush Snr. as photographic evidence attests.

No member of the Kenyan delegation at the time or since recalled any dispute. Nor was there was a meeting between Ouko and President Bush Snr during the trip to Washington, the reason cited for the alleged dispute. President Bush's official diary makes no mention of it; the US State Department have stated that it did not take place; no member of the delegation was aware or any such meeting, and further investigation conducted into Ouko's murder by the Kenyan police in 1991/92 found that, "There is no evidence to confirm that Ouko while in Washington met President Bush".

In May, 2013, Kenya's Truth, Justice and Reconciliation Commission (TJRC) published a report which concluded, under the section Political Assassinations, that: "In addition, the Washington Trip theory revolves around a private meeting with President Bush and Ouko that never actually occurred" (TJRC Report, Volume IIA, Chapter Four, paragraph 131).

The allegation made some 12 years later during a Parliamentary Select Committee Inquiry established in March 2003 to again look into the murder of Ouko, that Ouko had been banished by President Moi whilst on the visit to Washington, stripped of his ministerial rank, sent home on a different flight, his bodyguards dismissed, his passport removed on arrival in Nairobi, would also seem to be without foundation. Passenger manifests and witness testimony prove that Ouko travelled back from Washington with the rest of the Kenyan delegation to Nairobi. The delegation's return was a public event reported by the Kenyan media and newspaper reports, which are still available, carried photographs of President Moi and Ouko coming out of the plane together and doing the welcoming rounds at Jomo Kenyatta airport.

After his return from Washington Ouko was assigned an official trip to Gambia to deputise for Moi; he would have been unable to travel without a passport and Mrs Ouko's later gave evidence that she handed her husband's passport to Detective Superintendent Troon.

Official records and witness testimony also prove that Ouko continued to discharge his official functions, meeting with President Moi, government officials and diplomats and to give instructions to his official staff and travelling to his country residence accompanied by his driver and a bodyguard.

To date, there is no credible evidence to support Troon's conclusion that the Washington trip was a motive for the murder of Ouko.

=== The Kisumu 'Molasses Project' ===
Troon's second theory based on the allegations of Airaghi and Briner-Mattern, that intermediaries on behalf of several government officials that included Nicholas Biwott, Prof. George Saitoti and others had asked for bribes to facilitate the progress of the Molasses Project and that when these bribes were not paid Nicholas Biwott stood in the way of the project, would also seem to lack any evidential basis. The process and timescale by and over which the decision was taken to bring the Kisumu Molasses project to a halt would also seem to remove it as a likely cause for a dispute in 1990.

Cabinet papers, official records, and Ouko's own correspondence prove that ultimately all decisions relating to the Molasses Project were taken by the Kenyan Cabinet, record that both he and Nicholas Biwott were agreed on the need for the rehabilitation of the 'Molasses Project', and attest to the assistance Nicholas Biwott gave him and the co-operation between the two men. Subsequent parliamentary testimony confirmed that cabinet deliberations on the project involved multiple ministers and that responsibility for the project rested with the Ministry of Industry rather than the Ministry of Energy.

The allegation that Nicholas Biwott championed an alternative tender to receive a 'kickback' from the project is contradicted by the evidence as the two companies concerned, the Italian firms ABB Teconomassio SpA and Teconomasio Italiano/Brown Boveri, were both introduced to minister Dalmas Otieno by Domenico Airgahi and both belonged to the same multinational group. Thus there was no rival tender and there could have been no bribe asked for or paid for a company to pitch for a tender against itself. Troon and witness Dorothy Randiak further acknowledged during the Judicial Commission that there were no rival groups in the Molasses issue.

The Kenyan cabinet assigned specific duties to develop the Molasses Project to the Ministries of Industry and Finance ended on 3 November 1987, ending involvement by other ministries including Biwott’s Ministry of Energy over two years before Ouko was murdered. The Molasses Project was effectively abandoned in 1988, the decision being taken by Dalmas Otieno who had replaced Ouko as Minister for Industry following the election of that year, a decision taken nearly one-and-a-half years before Ouko was murdered.

Critically, Troon rejected Dalmas Otieno's evidence and did nor read, or ask for, the Kenyan Government's 'Molasses File' that would have substantiated Otieno's testimony.

Dalmas Otieno, in a witness statement made 21 May 1990, stated, "I personally interviewed Mr Airaghi and I considered he was not competent to handle the project and knew nothing about Molasses. He initially asked for one million US dollars for the feasibility study, he then halved his sum, and eventually settled for 300,000 dollars."

In a recent documentary series aired in March 2017 by Citizen TV lawyer Paul Muite said "if I was asked to speculate, my speculation would be that perhaps the Molasses issue were peripheral for the motives of the killing of Robert Ouko."

=== Dominico Airaghi and Marianne Briner-Mattern ===
Troon's reliance on the testimony of Domenico Airaghi and Marianne Briner-Mattern and his assessment that they were "truthful and honest" under "a reputable company" (Judicial Inquiry, 1990) has also been criticised in the light of subsequent revelations.

It was later to be revealed that for the entire period in which Dominic Airaghi was dealing with the Kenyan Government in respect of the Molasses Project he was on a bail, a convicted and sentenced criminal who had been found to have committed an offence of dishonesty. On 14 March 1987, Dominico Airaghi and an accomplice were convicted by the Civil and Criminal Court of Milan on charges of alleged corruption. It also being found by the Court that Airaghi had presented false evidence and false documents in an attempt to establish his defence. The Justice described Airaghi as having displayed "the attributes of an International Fortune Hunter." He was sentenced to two years and six months in prison and fined 2,000,000 lire.

Marianne Briner-Matter, or Marianne Briner as she termed herself at the time, who described herself as a "secretary" of "International Escort" an "employment agency", gave evidence in Airaghi's defence at his trial in Milan. The court found her evidence in support of Airaghi to be false. The judge said of Marianne Briner, "who lived with Airgahi", that it would better to draw a "compassionate veil" over her testimony and commented on her "unreliability" as a witness.

Airaghi appealed against his conviction, the final appeal ending in the conviction being upheld on 4 April 1991.

The use of four different names and two addresses in three years for the various entities of 'BAK', the company through which Airaghi and Briner-Mattern tendered for the Molasses Project, was also unknown to Troon at the time of his investigation although Dalmas Otieno, Kenya's Minister of Industry, gave evidence to Troon that 'BAK' was ultimately excluded from the Molasses Project because it was incompetent and in breach of contract.

'BAK Group Marianne Briner + Partner' was registered as a joint partnership on 13 February 1990, the day that Robert Ouko was murdered. Liquidation proceedings against this BAK entity were initiated in Switzerland on 25 February 1992 and in June of that year it was struck of the Register of Companies. At the same time as the insolvency proceedings in Switzerland, Airaghi and Briner-Mattern established PTA BAK Group International Consultants in Spain but it too was subsequently to be struck off the corporate register.

After Ouko's murder, Domenico Airaghi and Marianne Briner-Mattern's claim for losses in relation to the 'Molasses Project' increased from $150,000 to $5.975 million.

Troon accepted that, in the absence of evidence from Airaghi and Briner-Mattern, there was no evidence against Nicholas Biwott.

=== Public Inquiry ===
In October 1990, President Moi appointed a public inquiry into the case chaired by Justice Evans Gicheru. The inquiry was terminated by Moi in November 1991 at a point when Troon was being cross-examined on the grounds that he needed to return to the UK. He did not return to Kenya. The Gicheru Commission did not produce a final report.

Following the disbanding of the Gicheru Commission and the onset of the Kenyan police investigation, ten government officials were detained and questioned in relation to the investigation, including head of internal security Hezekiah Oyugi, Energy Minister Nicholas Biwott, Jonah Anguka, a District Commissioner from Nakuru and others. Nicholas Biwott was released after two weeks in the absence of "any evidence to support the allegations". Jonah Anguka, was tried for Ouko's murder in 1992 and acquitted, with the crime remaining unsolved. Anguka later fled into exile in the United States, saying he feared for his life. He has since published a book, "Absolute Power," denying his involvement in the Ouko Murder. We lost a young lawyer Advocate Masime who was part of this inquiry.

=== Parliamentary Select Committee ===
In March 2003 the newly elected government of Mwai Kibaki opened a new investigation into Ouko's death to be conducted by a parliamentary select committee. During the course of the committee's deliberations several members of parliament publicly condemned the manner of its proceedings. Six members of the committee (Paul Muite, Mirugi Kariukim, Dr Abdulahi Ali, Njoki S. Ndung’u and Otieno Kajwang) resigned during its hearings, and four others left to take up other appointments. Domenico Airaghi and Marianne Briner-Mattern agreed to testify on condition that they would not be cross-examined (something they had avoided during Troon's investigation, the Public Inquiry and the further investigation by the Kenyan police) and Nicholas Biwott was not allowed to call witnesses on his behalf or cross-examine or address other witnesses.

The Select Committee, however, did not complete its work. It was disbanded in 2005 on the grounds of 'interference' in its deliberations just as Nicholas Biwott was beginning his testimony to it. The (incomplete) report of the 'Select Committee Investigating Circumstances Leading to the Death of the Late Dr. The Hon. Robert John Ouko, EGH, MP' was never debated in the Kenyan House of Assembly, or put to a vote.

=== Defamation Proceedings ===
The investigation into Ouko's death led to several high-profile defamation cases in Kenya arising from unsubstantiated allegations made about various individuals who included George Oraro, a prominent Kenyan lawyer who had served as Ouko's personal legal counsel. George Oraro had been arrested for questioning during the initial police investigation in 1990, won a defamation case in 1992, receiving 1.5 million Kenyan Shillings in damages for libel contained in an affidavit.

In 1999, Nicholas Biwott filed defamation suits against Dr. Ian West and Chester Stern, authors of Dr. Ian West's Casebook, as well as the book's publishers and Kenyan distributors. The book, published in the UK and sold internationally including in Kenya, contained false allegations suggesting Biwott's involvement in Ouko's murder and accusing him of corruption. Dr. West had been the pathologist on the Scotland Yard team that investigated Ouko's death. In December 2000, Commissioner of Assize Alnashir Visram awarded Biwott 30 million Kenyan Shillings in damages, which was the largest libel award in Kenyan legal history at the time.

== Personal Life ==
Robert Ouko was married to Christabel Ouko. He had three sons, named Ken, Charlie, Andrew; and four daughters: Winnie, Susan, Lilian, and Carol. Robert Ouko also had a daughter (born May 1983) by a Miss Herine Violas Ogembo, a relationship that lasted until his death.

In 2010, a fundraiser was held to build the Robert Ouko Memorial Community Library in Koru.

== See also ==
- Luo people of Kenya and Tanzania
- Tom Mboya
