= Eisha =

Eisha is a female given name and may refer to:

- Eisha Marjara, Canadian film director
- Eisha Stephen Atieno Odhiambo, Kenyan academic
- Eisha Singh, Indian actress
