= Iain West =

Iain West (25 April 1944 – 23 July 2001) was a British forensic pathologist.

== Early life ==
West was born in Glasgow, Scotland on 25 April 1944, the son of a Squadron leader in the Royal Air Force. He was educated at Carre's Grammar School in Sleaford before returning to Scotland to study medicine at the University of Edinburgh, graduating in 1967. His early career interest was hematology but he quickly turned to forensic pathology whilst at Addenbrooke's Hospital, Cambridge and studied with Austin Gresham.

== Career ==
West was involved in examining numerous deaths, many which are described in the book Dr Iain West's Casebook, which he published in collaboration with the journalist Chester Stern. From 1984 to 1998 he was head of the Department of Forensic Medicine at Guy's Hospital.

Among the deaths West investigated were that of Robert Maxwell. Maxwell had fallen, jumped or been pushed overboard his yacht Lady Ghislaine on 5 November 1991. West was commissioned by the insurance company to examine whether the death was accidental, a suicide or murder. £20 million were to be paid if the death was accident or murder. West declared that Maxwell's death was likely to be suicide.

West also carried out the post-mortem examinations of the BBC TV presenter Jill Dando, the British police officer Yvonne Fletcher who was shot from the Libyan embassy in 1984, and Kenyan Minister for Foreign Affairs Robert Ouko.

West also played a part in the release of the British soldier Lee Clegg who had been convicted for murder.

== Personal life ==
West's second wife was Vesna Djurovic, also a noted pathologist.

West died on 23 July 2001 in Hastings, East Sussex.

== Publications ==
- Knapman, Paul A; West, Iain E (1989). Medicine and the Law. Heinemann Medical. ISBN 0433187409.
