= Kobura Ward =

Ward in Kenya - Kisumu County

Kobura Ward is a ward in Nyando Constituency, Kisumu County, Kenya. It comprises Masogo, Kotieno, Kamayoga, Lela, Nyamware North, Nyamware South, and Okana Sub-locations of Kisumu County. It has a population of around 36,261 people and covers 77.9 km2. It is land locked save for a short stream opening into Lake Victoria. Kobura land lies on a plain overlooked by the Nyakach, Kajulu and Nandi hills. These hills endow Kobura with several streams cutting across its area as well as helping form its borders. The ward is located only 5km from the Kisumu City. The ward is home to famous figures in Kenya and Kisumu. Billy Oliver Odhiambo, an independent candidate, represents the ward in the Kisumu County Assembly.

Elections	Ward	Party	Period	Notes
2013	Malin Akinyi Atieno	ODM	2013-2017	
2017	John A. Atieno	ODM	2017-2022	
2022	Billy Oliver Odhiambo	Independent candidate	2022-20-	
