= Dominic Makawiti =

Kenyan biochemist

Dominic Were Makawiti (4 August 1955 – 20 April 2018) was a Kenyan biochemist. He served as Vice Chancellor of Maseno University and was an elected fellow and former treasurer of the African Academy of Sciences.

== Biography ==
Dominic Were Makawati was born to Paul Awiti Odongo and Sulema Owuor Awiti on August 4, 1956 in Kisumu, Nyanza, Kenya. He attended Nyabondo Secondary School until 1970. He obtained a diploma in education degree from Kenya Science Teachers College, Nairobi (1976) and a bachelor of science degree in biochemistry and chemistry from the University of Nairobi (1979). He received his doctorate degree in reproductive biochemistry from the King's College School of Medicine and Dentistry at the University of London (1984).

== Career ==
Makawati started his career as a graduate assistant at the reproductive Biology Unit, Department of Animal Physiology, University of Nairobi (1980). He became research assistant (1985), a lecturer (1986), a senior lecturer (1989), an associate professor (1992). In the same year, he became the Chairman of the Department of Biochemistry . He was appointed as an associate Dean of Pre-Clinical Departments, College of Health Science in 1994. Following his full professorship in 1998, he was appointed as the Dean of School of Medicine in 2002.

== Honors and awards ==
Makawiti received the following honors:

- In 2006, he received the Head of State Commendation (HSC) award by the president of Kenya
- He was the Founder, and Treasurer, University of Nairobi Chemical Club
- He was a Member of East African Wild Life Society (EAWLS).
- He was a Member of the Institute of Biology of Britain (MIBiol).
- He was a Member of Natural Product Research Network for Eastern and Central Africa(NAPRECA).
- He was a Member of Biochemical Society of Kenya (BSK).
- He was a Member of Kenya Physiological Society (KPS).
- He was a Member of International Association for the Study of Medicinal Forest Plants (IAMFP)
- He was a Member of National Geographic Society, U.S.A.
- He was Member of Biochemical Society of Great Britain.
- He was a Member of South African Society of Biochemistry and Molecular Biology
- He was a Member of the New York Academy of Sciences.
