= Kombewa =

Coordinates: 0°06′S 34°31′E

Kombewa is a town in Western Kenya, located 35 km west of Kisumu City, along Kisumu-Bondo road, in Seme, the sub-county of Kisumu County.

== Description ==
Administrative Function

Kombewa is the main administrative centre of the Seme Sub-County. The Deputy County Commissioner Offices, Kombewa Police Station, among other offices are located in the town.

Tourist attraction

Kombewa is the home of the famous Kit Mikayi Rock, which is located approximately 15 km from Kombewa town. Ndere Island National Park is also within the borders of the great Kombewa Town, located in the Lake Victoria at Asat Beach.

Market Centre

Owing to its location on a busy highway, Kombewa has served as a market centre for the vast Seme and its surroundings, with other market centres only found in Holo, Akala.

Sports Center

Kombewa is home to the 2020 Seme Kodongo Tournament Champions Diemo Football Club, Young City Football Club among others.

Notable People

Notable people coming from the vicinity of Kombewa include; Ambrose Otieno Weda (lawyer), Prof Peter Anyang' Nyong 'o (Governor, Kisumu County), Lupita Nyong 'o, Julius Ondijo MajiMaji who sang Unbwogable and a media CEO, The Late 𝗝𝗼𝗿𝗮𝗺 𝗔𝗺𝗼𝗹𝗼 𝗚𝘂𝗺𝗯𝗮 (Rtd Teacher, former nominated Councillor and former Luo Elder for Seme, otherwise known as Ogai), Dr. James Nyikal (Rtd. Doctor and MP, Seme Constituency), Ochoro Ayoki (a former MP), Dixon Willis Awandu (a Rtd. Councillor and teacher), Prof Julius Nyabundi (VC Maseno University), Dennis Oliech (former Harambee Stars Captain), Hezekiah Oyugi, Barrack Onyango Otieno Gumba (Doctor, Youth Advocate and Chapter Lead at Jijenge Youth Organization-Siaya Kenya, Jaramogi Oginga Odinga University of Science and Technology), Barrack Gumba is also the Organizing Secretary and Programs coordinator of Reproductive Health Accountability and Response Kenya, RHARK. RHARK is a youth led CBO operating in Siaya County. Y-Mkenya (Celebrated Spoken word artist) and CEO/founder of Ngarisha Jamii Charity Foundation (Fredrick Midaho), Peter Otieno Akal (young entrepreneur), Osodhi Nyabende (former councilor), Ongota Ojuok, Peter Adino Omuga (former teacher and the pioneer of Nyamgun Primary School), Dr. Maurice Odhiambo Odindo, (CEO and director Manna Ministries International)

Health Centre

Kombewa County Hospital, Kenya Medical Research Institute and Walter Reed Research Center are located in the town. The development of The Harbor Hospital is underway, a health facility in the calibre of the Nairobi Hospital and Aga Khan Hospital.

Recreational Centre

Kombewa is home to many recreational facilities such as Kit Mikayi Green Park Hotel and Arom Center. Green Park Hotel and Arom Centre are bar and restaurants located in the town. Other recreational facilities include Tina Resort, Waterfront Park etc.

Educational Centre

It is home to Kit Mikayi Primary School, Kit Mikayi Secondary School, Diemo Primary School, Diemo Secondary School, Nyamgun Primary School, Nyamgun Secondary School, Kamonye primary school, Onyinjo Primary School, St. Johns Ngutu Secondary School, KMTC -Kombewa Hospital Campus, Pith K'abonyo Primary School, Kombewa Township Academy, Manna Academy, Seme Technical and Vacation Training Institute. Other notable schools near Kombewa include; Ngere High School, St Barnabas Girls - Bar Korwa, Ndiru Secondary School, Rapogi Secondary School, Ridore Secondary School, Asol Mixed Secondary School, Rata Mixed Secondary School etc.

Religious Center

The places of worship within Kombewa town include Newbirth Covenant Church (NBCC), Assemblies of God (AG), Glad Tidings Assemblies, The Anglican Church of Kenya, Roman Catholic among others.

Reference http://www.indepth-network.org/member-centres/kombewa-hdss
