= Kisumu West Constituency =

Kenyan electoral constituency

Kisumu West
- constituency for the Parliament of Kenya
- Kisumu West Constituency within Na County

- Na County within Kenya
- County: Kisumu
- Population: 172,821
- Area: 209 km^{2} (80.7 sq mi)

Current constituency
- Number of members: 1
- Party: ODM
- Member of Parliament: Rozaah Akinyi Buyu
- Wards: 5

Kisumu Town West is an electoral constituency in Kenya. It is one of seven constituencies of Kisumu County. The constituency was established for the 1997 elections, when the larger Kisumu Town Constituency was split into Kisumu Town East and West Constituencies. The constituency has eleven wards, all electing ward representatives for Kisumu County Assembly.

== Members of Parliament ==
Elections	MP	Party	Notes
1997	Job Omino	NDP	
2002	Job Omino	NARC	
2003	Kennedy Odhiambo Nyagudi	NARC	By-elections
2007	John Olago Aluoch	ODM	
2013	John Olago Aluoch	FORD-KENYA	
2017	John Olago Aluoch	FORD-KENYA	
2022	Rozaah Akinyi Buyu	ODM	

== Wards ==
Wards
Ward	Registered Voters
Aerodrome	2,676
Kaloleni / Shauri Moyo	3,623
Kibuye	5,655
Kisumu Central	9,054
Kisumu East	5,347
Kisumu North	4,873
Market	7,478
Milimani	8,441
Railway	11,855
South West Kisumu	6,724
Stadium	5,307
Total	71,033
*September 2005.
