= Maseno University =

Public university in Kisumu County, Kenya

Coordinates: 0°00′17″S 34°36′02″E

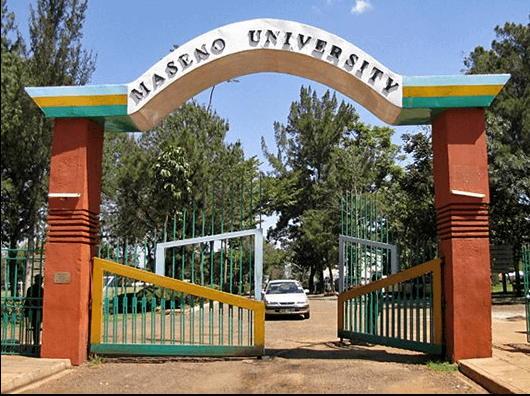
- Former name: Moi University
- Motto: Fountain of Excellence
- Type: Public
- Established: 2001
- Vice-Chancellor: Professor Julius Omondi Nyabundi
- Total staff: 3,000
- Students: 23,912
- Location: VQV2+QPQ Varsity Plaza, Achieng' Oneko Rd, Kisumu, Kenya, Maseno

Maseno University is a public university based in the Maseno district of the Kisumu County, Kenya, along the Equator. It was fully fledged as a university in 2001, after being a constituent college of Moi University for a decade. It has over 10,000 students pursuing programmes offered in the university campuses and it is currently ranked among the best universities in Kenya.

The main campus located in Maseno Township along Kisumu-Busia road, 25 km from Kisumu City and 400 km northwest of Nairobi. Apart from the main campus, it has other four satellite campuses in Nairobi, Kisumu, Homa Bay, and an online campus known as the eCampus.

The university has 12 schools and an institute offering various degrees, diplomas and certificates.

It has a student Organisation abbreviated [SOMU] -Student Organisation of Maseno University[-A name given to the organisation by the then king maker in students politics of Maseno Ogal sirkal[ogal Alexstone Erick] after students participation.The king Maker ensured students welfare was a priority of the admission and this earned him a recognition by naming one of the roads after him within the University despite opposition from Former President Fred Makajos, Wilingtone Raps and other notable political figures.

The eCampus, the first of its kind in Kenya, is a virtual campus that runs flexible online programmes both for on-campus students as well as off-campus students enrolled in various Maseno University programmes through eLearning.

The name 'Maseno' was coined by Rev. J.J. Willis from the name of a tree known in local dialects as "Oseno" or "Oluseno" that stood next to the spot where the first missionaries in the region erected their base.

== Faculties and schools ==
The university offers undergraduate and post-graduate program at the following faculties and schools:

- School of Arts and Social Sciences
- School of Education
- School of Biological and Physical Sciences
- School of Public Health and Community Development
- School of Environment and Earth Sciences
- School of Development and Strategic Studies
- School of Graduate Studies
- School of Nursing
- School of Business and Economics
- School of Medicine
- School of Agriculture and Food Security
- School of Mathematics, Statistics and Actuarial Science
- School of Computing and Informatics
- School of Law
- School of Planning and Architecture
- Institute of Gender Studies
- School of Pharmacy.

== History ==
In October 1990, Maseno Government Training Institute was merged with Siriba Teacher’s Training College to form Maseno University College as a constituent college of Moi University. It became a full fledged university 11 years later in 2001. It is an accredited university, enacted by an Act of Parliament in 1991.

At the December 2008 graduation ceremony, the president Mwai Kibaki, appointed Professor Frida Karani, as the second chancellor, after the expiry of the tenure of William Wamalwa. The new chancellor was honoured by Maseno University, receiving the Doctor of Education honoris causa before presiding over the ninth graduation ceremony on 17 December 2009.

The vice-chancellor was appointed on 18 February 2011, succeeding Professor Frederick N. Onyango. The Chancellor is Dr. Michael Joseph and the Chair of Council is Professor Rosalind Mutua. The current vice-chancellor is Professor Julius Omondi Nyabundi.

It is now chartered by the Commission of University Education (CUE) under the Education Act 2012.

== Kisumu Hotel ==
Kisumu Hotel was acquired by the university in 2004 under the then Vice-chancellor, Prof. Fredrick Onyango. The bed space has doubled from the original 40 to 80 rooms. The hotel has enabled the university to offer training in eco-tourism, and hotel and institution management.

== The eCampus ==
The eCampus of Maseno University evolved from what was initially set up in 2007 by the then Vice-Chancellor, Prof. Frederick N. Onyango, as an eLearning Centre. The eLearning Centre was situated at Maseno University's City Campus (now Kisumu Campus) providing capacity building and technical support services to lecturers to prepare them to offer open, distance and eLearning courses to off-campus students (or 'distance education' students as they were known then).

Prof. Onyango was an ardent believer in the role of technology in improving outcomes in higher education. Many years before this, he had mobilised the University Senate to introduce the 'With IT' curriculum at Maseno University, which required all undergraduate students of Maseno University to take basic IT courses that constituted 30% of their core curriculum. The typical course title for all undergraduate programmes offered by Maseno University had (and continue to have) the 'With IT' suffix, e.g. Bachelor of Arts (Criminology, With IT).

In 2009, Dr. Betty Obura Ogange, an experienced educationist with multi-disciplinary background in language education, information systems and online pedagogy, was hired as Coordinator of eLearning. Her core brief was to help develop structures for mainstreaming eLearning at Maseno University and gradually support the lecturers to embrace new strategies of teaching, learning and research using ICT, in ways that would benefit students registered for Maseno University programmes regardless of their geographical location.

The eLearning Centre would later be established in 2011 as an eCampus under the Maseno University Statutes, with Dr. Ogange as the Director. The incoming Vice-Chancellor at the time, Prof. Dominic W. Makawiti, and the Deputy Vice-Chancellor in charge of Academic Affairs, Prof. Madara Ogot, were both ICT enthusiasts who saw the potential for improved services to all students through the eCampus. They supported the immediate funding, capacity building and human resource needs that would make this happen.

As founding Director, Dr. Ogange worked with respective deans of schools and chairs of department, mobilised a team of technical and pedagogy experts as well as lecturers and administrative staff to evolve the structures, policies and systems that made the eCampus of Maseno University, the first of its kind in the region. Through the eCampus, the implementation of ICT in the curriculum at Maseno University had progressively moved from the understanding of ICT as a 'subject' to ICT as a 'resource' for learning.

A total of 17 programmes are currently offered at the eCampus for off-campus students located in Kenya, Uganda, Tanzania, Zambia and Nigeria, among other African countries. The eCampus continues to support a number of high-enrollment on-campus courses. For instance, the course PHT 112 HIV & AIDS Determinants, Prevention and Management is offered by the School of Public Health and Community Development and taken flexibly by an average of 2,000 - 3,000 students per semester, as it is a mandatory graduation requirement for all students.

== See also ==
- List of universities in Kenya
- Education in Kenya
