= Hezekiah Oyugi =

Kenyan civil servant

Hezekiah Nelson Oyugi (1942–1992), often called the most powerful Luo administrator in Kenya’s post-independence history, rose from humble rural beginnings to become one of the most feared and influential figures in President Daniel arap Moi’s regime. Born in South Kamagambo, Rongo area of what is now Migori County,Oyugi hailed from a modest Luo family. He attended Ranen Primary School, then crossed into Uganda for secondary education at Jinja High School. Back in Kenya, he trained at Kabianga Teachers Training College and quickly became principal of Migori Secondary School while still young.His shift from education to public administration began in the early 1970s. After serving as an assistant education officer and district education officer in Homa Bay, he was appointed District Officer in 1972. Between 1973 and 1976, he served as District Commissioner in various postings, including Kisumu, Nakuru, West Pokot, and Turkana. He later rose to Provincial Commissioner, gaining a reputation for efficiency and unyielding loyalty to the system. Oyugi was known for his sharp intellect and administrative acumen, but also for his ability to navigate the complex ethnic and political dynamics of the single-party state.

Fate accelerated his ascent on August 1, 1982, during the failed Kenya Air Force coup attempt. While many officials wavered, Oyugi—then Rift Valley Provincial Commissioner—stood firmly with Moi at Kabarak, reportedly declaring, “I will die for you, Mzee.” This display of loyalty earned him Moi’s deep trust. In December 1986, Moi appointed him Permanent Secretary in the Office of the President, responsible for Provincial Administration and Internal Security. Oyugi operated from State House itself, an unusual privilege that underscored his proximity to ultimate power.

At the height of his influence in the late 1980s and early 1990s, Oyugi was effectively the third most powerful man in Kenya after Moi and powerful minister Nicholas Biwott. He controlled a vast security apparatus, including a network of Special District Officers (SDOs)—loyal young intelligence operatives deployed across the country with vehicles and unchecked authority to monitor, intimidate, and neutralize perceived critics of the Nyayo regime. Provincial Commissioners and even senior police officers reportedly stood at attention and saluted when Oyugi called from Nairobi. His word could make or break political careers, particularly in Nyanza, where he helped shape Luo leadership to align with Moi. Critics accused his machinery of enabling repression, including operations linked to Nyayo House detention and torture chambers.

Oyugi’s tenure coincided with a turbulent period: multiparty agitation, economic strains, and internal rivalries. He was instrumental in managing provincial administration during the 1988 queue-voting elections, often cited as heavily rigged. His home area of Rongo reportedly boomed with development under his influence, earning him local nicknames like “The Governor” or “Kalam Maduong” (Big Pen), a nod to his sweeping authority.

Yet power proved precarious. In February 1990, Foreign Minister Dr. Robert Ouko was brutally murdered. A British detective leading the inquiry, John Troon, later named Oyugi and Biwott as principal suspects. Oyugi was arrested and detained briefly but released for lack of evidence. The case cast a long shadow over his career. In October 1991, Moi abruptly dismissed him. Oyugi was detained again at GSU headquarters for about two weeks before release. Upon returning home, he appeared disoriented and suffered from severe neuromotor complications.

On August 8, 1992, Oyugi died at age 50 under mysterious circumstances. Official accounts cited illness, but his family has long maintained he was poisoned—possibly during detention—with symptoms resembling those later seen in other political detainees. No state funeral was held, and top government officials were notably absent from his burial in Kanyajuok village. His death marked a dramatic fall from the pinnacle of power.

Oyugi left behind a complex legacy. To supporters, he was a dedicated public servant who transformed his rural constituency and demonstrated unwavering loyalty in a volatile era. To detractors, he embodied the authoritarian excesses of one-party rule, wielding intelligence networks that stifled dissent. Rumors persisted of vast wealth, including private vaults in family homes, though much of it allegedly dissipated after his passing amid family disputes and legal battles over properties.

The story of Hezekiah Oyugi reads like a cautionary tale of Kenyan politics: meteoric rise through loyalty and competence, immense unchecked power, entanglement in unresolved scandals, and a sudden, enigmatic end. In the Moi era’s inner circle, he exemplified how a civil servant could eclipse elected officials in influence—only for that influence to vanish almost overnight. His life remains a lens into the mechanics of power, fear, and fragility in late 20th-century Kenya.

Hezekiah Nelson Oyugi with one of his trademark Benz model W124 registered number KXN546.

Hezekiah Oyugi (died 1992) was head of internal security for the Republic of Kenya in 1990 when Foreign Minister Robert Ouko was murdered. Both he and energy minister Nicholas Biwott were named as "principal suspects" in the crime, by a British investigator during a commission of inquiry. Both were arrested but freed after two weeks for lack of evidence.
