= Nyando Constituency =

Kenyan electoral constituency

Nyando
- constituency for the Parliament of Kenya
- Nyando Constituency within Kisumu County

- Kisumu County within Kenya
- County: Kisumu
- Population: 161,508
- Area: 446 km^{2} (172.2 sq mi)

Current constituency
- Number of members: 1
- Party: ODM
- Member of Parliament: Jared Okello Odoyo
- Wards: 5

Nyando is an electoral constituency in Kenya. It is one of seven constituencies of Kisumu County.

The constituency was established for the 1963 elections, later split into Nyakach Constituency on 1966. In 1987 Muhoroni Constituency was split from Nyando, while parts of the dissolved Winam Constituency was incorporated into Nyando. It was one of three constituencies of the former Nyando District. As of 2019, Nyando had a population of 161,508 people (2019 census). Its current member of national assembly is Hon. Okelo Jared Odoyo of Orange Democratic Movement (ODM) party.

== Members of Parliament ==
Elections	MP	Party	Notes
1963	Okuto Bala	KANU	
1966	Okuto Bala	KANU	
1969	Tom Ogalo Ogada	KANU	One-party system
1974	Matthew C. Onyango Midika	KANU	One-party system
1979	Matthew C. Onyango Midika	KANU	One-party system
1983	Tom Ogalo Ogada	KANU	One-party system.
1988	James Miruka Owuor	KANU	One-party system.
1992	Clarkson Otieno Karan	FORD-Kenya	
1997	Paul Orwa Otita	NDP	
2002	Eric Opon Nyamunga	NARC	
2007	Frederick Outa Otieno	ODM	
2013	Frederick Outa Otieno	ODM	
2017	Jared Okello Odoyo	ODM	
2022	Jared Okello Odoyo	ODM	

== Wards ==
Ward	Population (Approx.)	Comprises part of:
Kobura Ward	36.261	Kotieno, Kamayoga, Lela, Masogo, Nyamware North, Nyamware South, Rabour and Okana Sub–Locations of Kisumu County
East Kano/Wawidhi	17,334	Magina, Nyakongo, Katolo, Achego and Ayweyo sub–Locations
Ahero	31,440	Kakola Ahero, Tura, Kakola, Kakola Ombaka, Kochogo Central and Kochogo North sub–Location of Kisumu County
Awasi/Onjiko	30,937	Kakmie, Kobongo, Border I, Ayucha, Border II and Wang’ang’a Sub–Locations
Kabonyo/Kanyagwal	25,065	Kabonyo Irrigation Scheme, Kapiyo, Upper Bwanda, Kwa Kungu, Central Bwanda, Kolal, Anyuro, Ogenya, Ugwe, Nduru and Kadhiambo Sub–Locations
Total	141,037	
*May 2022.		
