= Kenya Industrial Property Institute =

The Kenya Industrial Property Institute (KIPI) is a State Corporation under the Ministry of Investments, Trade and Industry that seeks to promote inventive and innovative activities through the protection of Industrial Property rights. It was formally established on 2 May 2002 following the enactment of the Kenya Industrial Property Act, 2001. Prior to this, the institution functioned as the Kenya Industrial Property Office (KIPO), which was created in February 1990 under the Industrial Property Act (Cap 509 of the Laws of Kenya).

The mandate of the Institute as provided for under the Industrial Property Act and the Trade Marks Act is to promote inventive and innovative activities and facilitate the acquisition of technology through registration and regulation of patents, utility models, technovations, industrial designs and trademarks.

== History ==
The legislation to introduce the Kenya Industrial Property Act of 2001 had been introduced by then Minister of Trade and Industry and East African Tourism Nicholas Biwott. The Industrial Property Bill introduced by Biwott provided the statutory framework for the protection of patents, industrial designs and utility models, and the formal established of the Kenya Industrial Property Institute. The legislation aligned Kenya’s industrial property regime with international standards, including the TRIPS Agreement.

The Kenya Industrial Property Act would eventually pave way for the commercial importation of cheaper (generic) medicines in Kenya, enabling the importation of chepaer antiretroviral drugs (ARVs) in the country.

=== Legal and Regulatory framework ===
The legal and regulatory framework guiding industrial property in Kenya is anchored in the Constitution of Kenya (2010), which provides the overarching basis for the protection of intellectual property rights. This framework is further supported by key legislation, including the Industrial Property Act (2001), the Trademarks Act, the Industrial Property Regulations (2002), and the Statute Law (Miscellaneous Amendments) Act No. 11 of 2017. In addition, a range of guidelines, such as the Guidelines to Patenting and Commercialization Guidelines, provide practical direction on the protection and utilization of intellectual property. Kenya is also a signatory to several regional and international agreements that strengthen its IP regime, including the Harare Agreement, the Lusaka Agreement, and the Banjul Protocol.

=== Services ===
Services of the Kenya Industrial Property Institute, as any other government service in Kenya, can access and pay for KIPI services through the e-citizen platform.
