= Frederick Outa Otieno =

Kenyan politician

Frederick Outa Otieno is a Kenyan politician. He belongs to the Orange Democratic Movement and was elected to represent the Nyando Constituency in the National Assembly of Kenya since the 2007 Kenyan parliamentary election.
