= John Olago Aluoch =

Kenyan politician

John Olago Aluoch is a Kenyan politician. He started out in the Orange Democratic Movement and was elected to represent the Kisumu Town West Constituency in the National Assembly of Kenya since the 2007 Kenyan parliamentary election. He currently is the Member of Parliament for Kisumu West Constituency on a Ford-Kenya ticket following the 2013 General Elections.
