= Kibigori =

Town in Kisumu County, Kenya

Coordinates: 00°04′00″S 35°03′00″E

Kibigori is a small town in Kisumu County, Kenya. It is located 20 kilometres east of Kisumu. It is part of the Chemelil ward of Muhoroni Constituency and Nyando County Council. Its elevation is 1242 metres above sea level.

Inhabitants of Kibigori, a cosmopolitan town, includes many communities from Kenya such as the Nandi, Luhya, Kisii with the majority being Luos. The town is also home to Nubians who settled there as Kibigori was a settlement scheme. The communities engage in sugar cane large scale farming and small scale farming of other food crops.

== Transport ==
It is served by a railway station on the national railway network, between the Stations of Miwani and Chemelil.

== See also ==
- Railway stations in Kenya
