= Koru, Kenya =

Village in Kisumu County, Kenya

Koru is a small town centre in Kisumu County, Kenya, Africa (0.1833° S, 35.2667° E). It forms an electoral ward of Muhoroni Constituency and Muhoroni town council. Koru is also a location in the Muhoroni division. It is at an elevation of 1540m.

== Transport ==
The town centre is served by a station on a lightly built branchline of the national railway system. In 2009, this branchline was upgraded. Koru is located between the stations of Muhoroni and Fort Ternan.

== Paleontology ==
The first fossil remains of Proconsul, a primate species, was found in Koru in 1909 by a gold prospector.

== Notable people ==
- Robert Ouko, Kenyan foreign minister, was murdered near his home in Koru and his body was found at the nearby Got Alila hill.
