= Patrick Ayiecho Olweny =

Kenyan politician

Patrick Ayiecho Olweny is a Kenyan politician. He belongs to the Orange Democratic Movement and was elected to represent the Muhoroni Constituency in the National Assembly of Kenya in the 2007 Kenyan parliamentary election. In 2010 he created tribalist controversy by urging Luo people to disregard family planning and make as many children as possible to make the tribe more prominent in census and thus Kenyan politics.
