= Kisumu Town Constituency =

Kisumu Town constituency was an electoral constituency in Kisumu County, Kenya (1963-1996) and was dissolved before the General Elections of 1997.

== Members of Parliament ==
| === Election Year === | === Member of Parliament === | === Party === |
| 1963 | Jamal, Amir Hasham | KANU |
| 1966 | Jamal, Amir Hasham | KANU |
| 1969 | === Grace Aketch Onyango === | KANU |
| 1974 | Grace Aketch Onyango | KANU |
| 1979 | === Grace Aketch Onyango === | KANU |
| 1983 | Wilson Ndolo Ayah | KANU |
| 1988 | Robert John Ouko | KANU |
| 1990 | Joab Omino | KANU |
| 1992 | Joab Omino | FORD-Asili |
