= Gor Sunguh Commission =

Kenya Parliamentary Select Committee

The Gor Sungu Commission was a Kenya Parliamentary Select Committee investigating circumstances leading to the death of the late Dr. Robert Ouko.

== Committee setup ==
Between April 2003 and March 2005 Gor Sunguh was the chairman of the 'Parliamentary Select Committee Investigating Circumstances Leading to the Death of the Late Dr. Robert Ouko, EGH, MP' tasked with investigating the death of former Kenyan Foreign Affairs Minister, Dr Robert Ouko, in February 1990 .

== Hearings ==
The Committee heard allegations of a dispute going back to the 1988 General Election (PSCI para 249) over opposition to the revival of the Kisumu Molasses Plant in Dr Ouko’s constituency. There were also allegations that ‘senior public figures’ demanded ‘kickbacks’ over the revival of the Kisumu Molasses Plant (PSCI para 250).

The Committee also ‘received evidence’ that there had been row between a Nicholas Biwott (Minister of Energy at the time of Ouko’s murder) and Dr Ouko over a meeting with President George Bush Snr during an overseas visit to in late January and early February 1990 when a delegation of 84 ministers and officials led by Kenya’s President Daniel arap Moi, had attended a private ‘Prayer Breakfast’ in Washington D.C. (PSCI paras 251 and 252).

According to the ‘Washington trip’ theory Dr Ouko had met with President Bush Snr, US Secretary of State James Baker, President Moi, Nicholas Biwott and others, at which the US President had allegedly urged Moi to hand over the Kenyan presidency to Dr Ouko who ‘could resuscitate Kenya from its diminished international standing due to corruption and human rights abuse’. (PSCI para 252)

The Sunguh Committee’s ‘Washington trip’ theory also stated that the government of the United Kingdom had urged President Moi to ensure Dr Ouko’s election in Kenya’s 1988 General Elections ‘being one believed capable of succeeding him’. (PSCI para 252 (ii))

The ‘misconstrued perception’ that Dr Ouko was ‘seeking foreign support to accede to the presidency’ was, according to the Sunguh Committee, ‘sufficiently supported as a motive to cause his death’. (PSCI para 252 (iii))

As a result of ‘the differences between Dr. R.J, Ouko and Hon. K.N.K. Biwott’ (PSCI para 251 (ii)) the Committee suggested, Dr Ouko had flown back to Kenya on a separate flight from President Moi, his passport had been seized at Nairobi airport, his official car was withdrawn, his bodyguard recalled and he had been ‘sacked’ by President Moi who directed him ‘to rest at his Koru farm’. (PSCI para 253 (iii))

Sunguh’s Committee concluded that Dr Ouko had disappeared from his farm ‘in the early hours of 13 February, [1990], abducted and taken to State House, Nakuru, 'where he was killed allegedly 'in the presence of among others, Hon. K.N.K. Biwott'. (PSCI para 253 (iv)

In all Sunguh’s Committee named recommended that the Kenyan government should investigate the role of over 40 people for their possible involvement in the murder of Dr Robert Ouko. Sunguh’s Committee however, ‘faced various challenges to its work’ and it operations were ‘dogged by controversy’ (Lest We Forget: The Faces of Impunity in Kenya’. (Kenya Human Rights Commission Report, 2011, page 35)

== Membership ==
Six members of the Select Committee, Paul Muite, Mirugi Kariuki, Dr Abdulahi Ali, Njoki Susanna Ndung'u and Otieno Kajwang – resigned during its hearings. Four others left to take up other appointments. New members were appointed to the Committee. Of the 10 members of the Committee in post at the end, four did not sign the Committee's report. (KHRC report, page 36)

=== Gor Sunguh ===
Gor Sunguh is a politician and former member of Parliament in Kenya as representative of the Kisumu Town East Constituency (1997-2002). Between April 2003 and March 2005 Sunguh was the chairman of the 'Parliamentary Select Committee Investigating Circumstances Leading to the Death of the Late Dr. Robert Ouko, EGH, MP'.

== Report ==
The Select Committee's report was signed by Gor Sunguh on 15 March 2005, just over 15 years after the minister's murder.

The Parliamentary Select Committee's 'Recommendations and Conclusions' (PSCI paras 249–258) suggested several possible factors leading to the murder of Dr Robert Ouko.

The parliamentary Select Committee’s Report was re-introduced to Kenya’s parliament on 8 December 2010 and debated on 15 December. It was rejected on 22 December, ‘with members of Parliament accusing the committee of doing shoddy work and using the committee’s investigations to settle political scores’. ( KHRC Report, page 36)

Critical to the weakness of the Sunguh Committee's investigation and reports were two facts that had been in the public domain since 1990 and 1991.

The forensic evidence and analysis submitted by Britain's Scotland Yard as set out in Detective Superintendent John Troon's 'Final Report' stated that Dr Ouko had been shot where his body was found, or a few feet from that spot (TFR para 290). And eye witness testimony gathered at the time of Ouko’s murder and set out in both Troon’s ‘Final Report’ and the ‘Further Investigations’ report from the Kenyan police released a year later, placed Dr Ouko’s day and time of death at somewhere between 3am and 1pm on 13 February 1990. (Kenya Police Further Investigations, pages 12–13 and TFR)

== Committee decision ==
This evidence made it impossible for Dr Robert Ouko to have been shot at State House Nakuru and his body taken to where it was subsequently found some time between 12 and 16 February 1990, as Sunguh's Committee had concluded.
