= Munyua Waiyaki =

Kenyan politician

Dr. Fredrick Lawrence Munyua Waiyaki (12 December 1926 – 25 April 2017) was a Kenyan politician. He served as Minister for Agriculture, Minister of Foreign Affairs, and as a Member of Parliament for the Kasarani Constituency.

== Early life and education ==
He attended Alliance High School up to 1945. He then attended Adams college where he studied physics, chemistry and mathematics before he proceeded to University of Fort Hare in Eastern Cape Province in South Africa for his bachelor of science degree. He arrived at Mombasa by sea from South Africa in 1951 after which his father introduced him to Jomo Kenyatta and Mbiyu Koinange at a restaurant along Latema road in Nairobi. A few months later he went for further studies in Britain which he pursued until he returned to Kenya in 1958. He was offered a job by the Kenyan government to work as a medical doctor a position he served for less than a year since he retired and opted to set up his own clinic along Victoria Street (which is now known as Tom Mboya Street). At the same time he started becoming active in politics since he served as the District chairman for Kenya African National Union (KANU) for the period of 1960-1968.

== Political career ==
In 1962 he challenged Tom Mboya for the Nairobi East parliament seat but he lost by 2668 votes to 31407. He entered into parliament for the first time in May 1963 as a Member of Parliament for North Eastern Nairobi (now Kasarani) and he also became the Permanent Secretary for the Ministry of Health and Housing. In 1963, he was appointed as Parliamentary Secretary.

== Death ==
On 25 April 2017 it was reported that Waiyaki had died in Aga Khan Hospital in Nairobi while undergoing treatment.
