= Minister for Foreign Affairs (Kenya) =

Kenyan cabinet position

This page lists foreign ministers of Kenya:

N	Name	Term of office
1	Jomo Kenyatta (20 October 1890–22 August 1978)	1963–1964
2	Joseph Murumbi (18 June 1911– 22 June 1990)	1964–1966
3	Mbiyu Koinange (1 July 1907–2 September 1981)	1966–1967
4	James Nyamweya (28 December 1927–25 September 1995)	1967–1968
5	C.M.G. Argwings-Kodhek (26 October 1923–29 January 1969)	1968–1969
(3)	Mbiyu Koinange (1 July 1907–2 September 1981)	1969
6	Njoroge Mungai (7 January 1926–16 August 2014)	1969–1974
7	Fredick Lawrence Munyua Waiyaki (12 December 1926–25 April 2017)	1974–1979
8	John Robert Ouko (31 March 1931–13 February 1990)	1979–1983
9	Elijah Mwangale (1 January 1939–25 November 2004)	1983–1987
10	Zachary Theodore Onyonka (28 June 1939–22 October 1996)	1987–1988
(9)	Robert Ouko (31 March 1931–13 February 1990)	1988–1990
11	Wilson Ndolo Ayah (29 April 1932–16 March 2016)	1990–1993
12	Kalonzo Musyoka (24 December 1953)	1993–1998
13	Bonaya Godana (2 September 1952–10 April 2006)	1998–2001
14	Chris Obure (29 September 1943)	2001
15	Marsden Herman Madoka (15 March 1943)	2001–2003
(12)	Kalonzo Musyoka (24 December 1953)	2003–2004
16	Chirau Ali Mwakwere (15 June 1945)	2004–2005
17	Raphael Tuju (30 March 1959)	2005–2007
18	Moses Wetangula (13 September 1956)	2008–2010
19	George Saitoti (3 August 1945–10 June 2012)	2010–2011
(18)	Moses Wetangula (13 September 1956)	2011–2012
20	Sam Ongeri (23 February 1938)	2012–2013
21	Amina Mohamed (5 October 1961)	2013–2018
22	Monica Juma (26 September 1963)	2018–2020
23	Raychelle Omamo (18 July 1962)	2020–2022
24	Alfred Mutua (22 August 1970)	2022–2023
25	Musalia Mudavadi (21 September 1960)	2023–

== See also ==
- Kenya
  - Ministry of Foreign Affairs (Kenya)
  - Heads of State of Kenya
  - Heads of Government of Kenya
  - Vice-Presidents of Kenya
  - Colonial Heads of Kenya
- Lists of Incumbents

== Notes and references ==
- Ministry of Foreign Affairs: About the Ministry
