= Kisumu East Constituency =

Electoral constituency of Kenya

Kisumu East
- constituency for the Parliament of Kenya
- Kisumu East Constituency within Kisumu County

- Kisumu County within Kenya
- County: Kisumu
- Population: 220,997
- Area: 142 km^{2} (54.8 sq mi)

Current constituency
- Number of members: 1
- Party: Independent
- Member of Parliament: Shakeel Shabbir
- Wards: 5

Kisumu Town East is an electoral constituency in Kenya. It is one of seven constituencies of Kisumu County. The constituency was established for the 1997 elections, when the larger Kisumu Town Constituency was split into Kisumu Town West and East Constituencies. The constituency has six wards, all electing ward representatives for Kisumu County Assembly.

== Members of Parliament ==
Elections	MP	Party	Notes
1997	Gor Sunguh	NDP	
2002	Gor Sunguh	NARC	
2007	Ahmed Shakeel Shabbir Ahmed	ODM	
2013	Ahmed Shakeel Shabbir Ahmed	ODM	
2017	Ahmed Shakeel Shabbir Ahmed	Independent	
2022	Ahmed Shakeel Shabbir Ahmed	Independent	

== Wards ==
Ward	Registered Voters
Central Kolwa	5,831
East Kajulu	4,357
East Kolwa	6,158
Manyatta	14,520
Nyalenda A	9,586
West Kajulu	4,869
Total	43,963
*September 2005.
