= Eisha Stephen Atieno Odhiambo =

Kenyan academic

Eisha Stephen Atieno Odhiambo (1945 – 25 February 2009)) was a Kenyan academic born in Muhoroni, known for his contributions to the understanding of dangers inherent in politics of knowledge and sociology of power. Dr Odhiambo was professor of history at Rice University in the United States, where he led in the study of cultures. He was educated at Makerere University in Uganda and the University of Nairobi in Kenya.

Odhiambo retired from Rice University due to illness and moved back with his wife to their home in Ndere, Siaya, Kenya, before his 2009 death at the Aga Khan Hospital in Kisumu.

== Bibliography ==
- History of East Africa. ISBN 978-0-582-60886-3 (Addison-Wesley Longman Ltd, 10/01/1978)
- Mau Mau and Nationhood: Arms, Authority, and Narration, ed. John Lonsdale, ISBN 978-0-8214-1484-2 (Ohio University Press - 01/01/2003)
- Risks Of Knowledge: Investigations Into The Death Of The Hon. Minister John Robert Ouko In Kenya, 1990 (with David William Cohen) ISBN 978-0-8214-1598-6 (Ohio University Press, 11/01/2004)
- Cohen, David W.; E. S. A. Odhiambo (1989). Siaya: The Historical Anthropology of an African Landscape. Athens: Ohio University Press. ISBN 978-0-8214-0902-2.
