= Chemelil =

Town in Kenya

- Town
- Interactive map of Chemelil
- Coordinates: 0.0825579°S 35.1293524°E
- Country: Kenya
- County: Kisumu
- District: Muhoroni

Chemelil is a town in Kisumu County, Kenya. It is part of Muhoroni District. Chemelil has a railway station along the Nairobi-Kisumu Railway line between the stations of Kibigori and Muhoroni. The town is located 40 kilometres east of Kisumu, the county capital. Muhoroni, another town, is located 10 kilometres east of Chemelil.

Chemelil is home to Chemelil Sugar Company. The latter also owns Chemelil Sugar FC, a football club playing in the Kenyan Premier League. Its home ground is Chemelil Sports Complex.

The educational facilities in Chemelil include Chemelil Sugar Academy (secondary school), Chemelil Factory Primary School, and Chemelil Sugar Primary School.

Since February 2022, it has been home to a "ZipLine" distribution center used to deliver medical supplies, veterinary goods and animal DNA, to 1012 facilities within the surrounding Region using drones.
