= Elijah Mwangale =

Kenyan politician

Elijah Wasike Mwangale
- Born: January 1939; Kenya
- Died: 2004|11|24
- Education: West Virginia University, Morgantown, WV, USA

Elijah Wasike Mwangale (January 1939 – 24 November 2004) was a Kenyan politician. He was a minister for Agriculture, Minister of Foreign Affairs and a former member of parliament for the Kimilili Constituency. Attended West Virginia University in Morgantown, WV, USA.
