= Fort Ternan =

Town in Kericho County, Kenya

Coordinates: 00°12′00″S 35°21′00″E

Fort Ternan is a small town in Kericho County, Kenya, located 82 kilometres east of Kisumu and eleven kilometres east of Koru. It is named after Col. Trevor Ternan C.M.G.D.S.O. Fort Ternan is located at the western border of the former Rift Valley Province. Fort Ternan forms is the Headquarters of Chilchila ward of Kipkelion West Constituency in Kericho County . Fort Ternan hosts Chilchila location and Chilchila division Headquarters.

== Transport ==
It is served by a railway station on the branch line to Kisumu on the national railway system. The railway is heavily graded in the vicinity of this station.

The Highway Construction running From Nakuru To Kisumu through Londiani has connected the town to Kericho and Kisumu. There are local roads leading to highly productive highland areas like Kipsinende, Cherara, Kokwet, Chepkechei, Koisagat, Chepkitar and Lelu.

== Paleontology ==
Fossils of the Middle Miocene 14 million year old ape Kenyapithecus wickeri were first found by Louis Leakey near Fort Ternan in 1962. There is a prehistoric site and museum about 15 kilometers from Fort Ternan Town, though the fossils themselves are housed at the National Museums of Kenya in Nairobi.

A skull belonging to the Cro-Magnon man was also found in Fort Ternan town, near Chilchila Primary School.

== Economic activity ==
The main economic activity is cash crop farming. Coffee, sugar cane and tea (in a few high altitude areas) are grown in small-scale holding farms. Adjacent to the town is Kipkelion Coffee millers where most of the coffee is supplied by farmers.

Other crops grown around the town are subsistence crops such as maize, beans, tomatoes, potatoes, etc.

== Education ==
The town is surrounded by a number of both primary and secondary schools. There is also an upcoming institute – Kipsinende Technical Institute.

== See also ==
- Railway stations in Kenya
