= Muhoroni =

Town in Kisumu County

Coordinates: 00°09′S 35°12′E

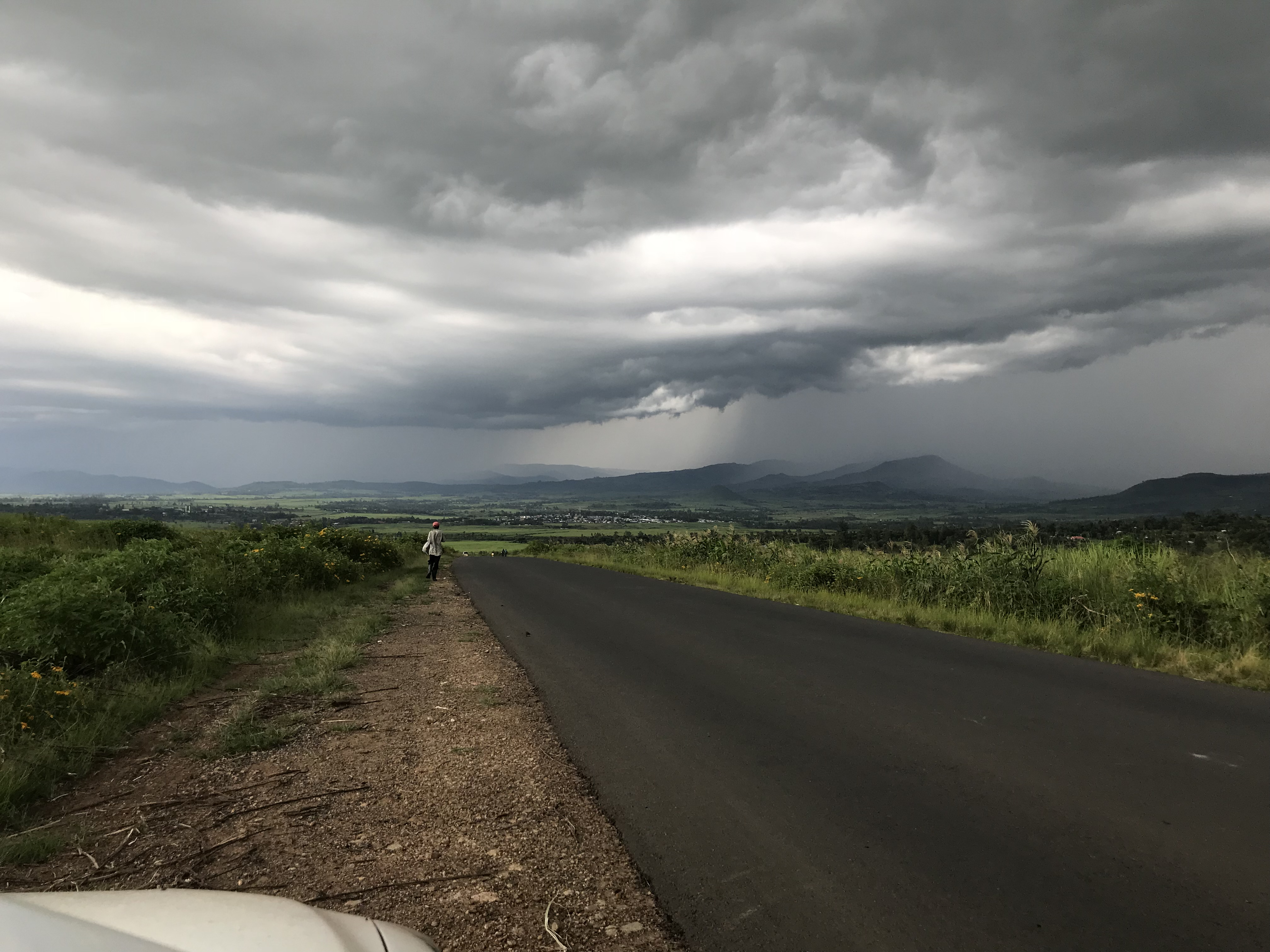
Sugar cane farm along Muhoroni road

Muhoroni is a town in Kisumu County, Kenya. Muhoroni hosts a town council. It had an urban population of 13,664 and a total population of 31,148 (1999 census). Muhoroni has a railway station along the Nairobi-Kisumu Railway. The town is located 50 kilometres east of Kisumu. Chemelil, a smaller town, is located 10 kilometres west of Muhoroni. The cost of living in Muhoroni is so high, coupled with a scarcity of housing facilities.

== Township ==
The Muhoroni town council has five wards: Fort Ternan, God Nyithindo, Koru, Muhoroni Town, and Owaga.

Muhoroni is home to Muhoroni Sugar Mill and Agro-Chemical & food Company Limited among others. The latter also owns Agro-Chemical while the former is the principal sponsor to the now relegated Muhoroni Youth football Club both of which have had a stint at the top flight level Kenyan Premier League.

== Geography ==
Elevation is 1475m.

== See also ==
- Railway stations in Kenya
