= Otieno =

Otieno may refer to:

- Arnold Origi (born 1983), Kenyan footballer
- Dalmas Otieno (1945–2025), Kenyan politician
- Douglas Otieno Okola (born 1980), Kenyan boxer
- Elijah Otieno (born 1988), Kenyan cricketer
- Eric Otieno (born 1956), Kenyan field hockey player
- Francis Otieno (born 1979), Kenyan cricketer
- Frederick Outa Otieno, Kenyan politician
- Ian Otieno (born 1993), Kenyan footballer
- Irene Awino Otieno (born 1986), Kenyan rugby player
- Isaac Oyieko (born 1979), Kenyan cricketer
- Kennedy Otieno (born 1972), Kenyan cricketer
- Martin Oduor-Otieno (1956), Kenyan businessman
- Martin Otieno Ogindo, Kenyan politician
- Moses Otieno Kajwang (born 1979), Kenyan politician
- Musa Otieno (born 1973), Kenyan soccer player
- Otieno Kajwang (1959–2014), Kenyan politician
- Silvano Melea Otieno (1931–1986), Kenyan footballer
- Stacy Awour Otieno (1990), Kenyan rugby player
- Wambui Otieno (1936–2011), Kenyan politician
- Zedekiah Otieno (born 1968), Kenyan footballer

== See also ==
- Killing of Irvo Otieno
