= Joseph Odero-Jowi =

Kenyan politician and diplomat (1936–2015)

Permanent Representative of Kenya to the United Nations
- In office c. 1970 – c. 1974

Member of Parliament for Ndhiwa Constituency
- In office 1966–1970
- Succeeded by: Matthew Otieno Ogingo
- In office 1974 – c. 1977
- Preceded by: Matthew Otieno Ogingo
- Succeeded by: Zablon Owigo Olang

Personal details
- Born: 15 August 1936; Sori, Migori County, Kenya
- Died: 17 October 2015 (aged 79)
- Political party: KANU
- Education: Kisii School
- Occupation: Politician; diplomat

Joseph Odero-Jowi (August 15, 1936 – October 17, 2015) was a Kenyan politician and diplomat. He represented Kenya in the United Nations for several years, working to bring the United Nations Environment Programme's headquarters to Nairobi.

== Biography ==
Jowi was born on August 15, 1936, in Sori, Kenya, and attended the village's primary school, the Kisii School and the Kagumo Teachers College. He also spent several years in India at the universities of Calcutta and New Delhi, studying economics.

He was principal of the African Labour College in Kampala, Uganda, from 1961 to 1963. In 1963 he married Salome and returned to Kenya. In 1963, Jowi was elected to the House of Representatives from Lambwe, Nyanza Province, with 20,222 votes to 13,495 for his nearest competitor, in Kenya's last election prior to independence. In 1966, Jowi was elected to represent the Ndhiwa Constituency in the Kenyan National Assembly. He worked in the Ministry of Labour, then the Ministry of Finance. In 1969 Jowi briefly served as minister for economic planning and development in Kenya's cabinet after Tom Mboya, who had held the role, was assassinated. He lost reelection later that year, and was appointed Kenya's ambassador to the United Nations. In that role, Jowi was a key figure in getting the United Nations Environment Programme's headquarters to be placed in Nairobi in the early 1970s. In 1974 he left the UN to be re-elected to the Kenyan Parliament, representing Ndhiwa. However, three years later Jowi resigned and returned to the United Nations.

In 2007 Jowi was awarded named an Elder of the Order of the Burning Spear. In 2014 he was described as living in a housing development in Langata, Kenya, with his wife. He died on October 17, 2015.
