= Mbita Point =

Kenyan town

Coordinates: 0°42′S 34°20′E

Mbita Point is a town in the former province of Nyanza, Kenya, currently in Homa Bay County, on the shores of Lake Victoria. It is home to the Thomas Odhiambo campus of the International Centre of Insect Physiology and Ecology (ICIPE). A public primary school formerly international and a clinic are hosted by the centre. Mbita has several other primary schools as well as secondary schools. A small sub-district hospital is in the town. The main district hospital is in the neighbouring town of Sindo, 17 km away. Mbita has had water and electricity since 2005. Mbita Point has an urban population of 6100, but the population grows rapidly due to urbanization, new technologies like cell phone coverage and internet connection through cyber cafes, electrification, trade and education. The town was the capital of the former Suba District.

Mbita can be reach by road Kisumu-Ahero-Katito-Kendu Bay-Homa Bay (150 km) or from Kisumu-Luanda Kotieno (90 km) and a 45-minute ferry ride across Winam Gulf. This latter road was tarmacked in 2011. The main income-generating activity in Mbita is fishing, but tourism is becoming a new trade as the road connections to the rest of the country are being improved. There is a tourist resort on the beach about 3 km to the south of the town, Lake Victoria Safari Village and Mfangano island camp which is located on a nearby island. This can be connected by the ferry which leaves from Mbita twice a day at 10:30 and 17:00. Ruma National Park is a 40-minute drive from Mbita. A causeway links Mbita to nearby Rusinga Island, the Island itself is a place that is worth touring as it has numerous hills surrounded by the lake. The causeway was built in 2017.
