= 2012 Kenya Police helicopter crash =

Aviation accident in Kenya

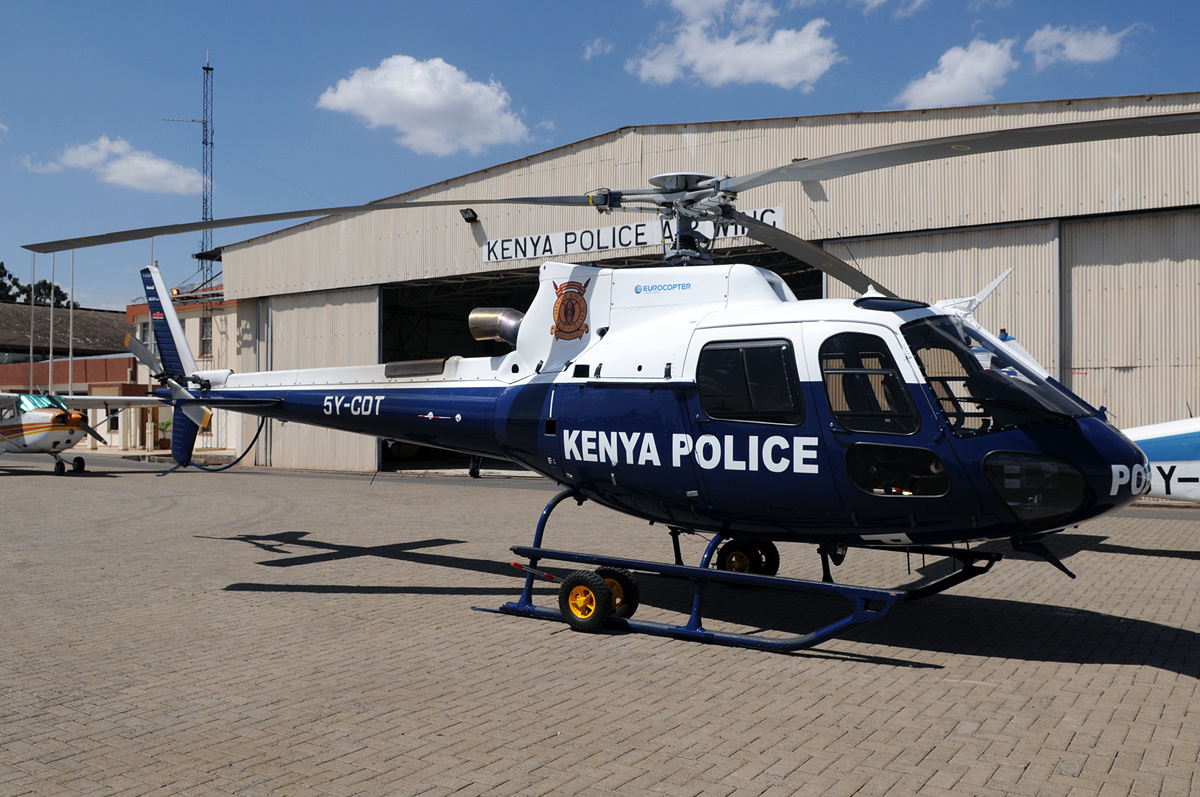
- 5Y-CDT, the helicopter involved, five months before the accident

Accident
- Date: 10 June 2012
- Summary: Loss of control in poor visibility
- Site: Ngong Forest near Nairobi, Kenya; 1°22′25″S 36°38′22″E

Aircraft
- Aircraft type: Eurocopter AS350
- Operator: Kenya Police Air Wing
- Registration: 5Y-CDT
- Flight origin: Wilson Airport, Nairobi, Kenya
- Destination: Ndhiwa, Homa Bay County, Kenya
- Occupants: 6
- Passengers: 4
- Crew: 2
- Fatalities: 6
- Survivors: 0

On 10 June 2012, an aviation accident occurred involving a Kenya Police helicopter. The Eurocopter AS350 crashed on a hill, killing all six people on board. Among the fatalities were Kenya's Interior Security Minister George Saitoti and his Assistant Minister Joshua Orwa Ojode.

== Background ==
The aircraft was on a flight from Nairobi to Ratang’a village in Ndhiwa Constituency, Homa Bay County. The two ministers on board – Interior Security Minister George Saitoti, who had announced his intention to run for Kenya's presidency, and Assistant Minister Joshua Orwa Ojode – had planned to attend a fundraising event at the Nyarongi Catholic Church. The two were to attend a Mass, which was interrupted by the Homa Bay District Commissioner and the local police chief, who broke the news about the deaths to those awaiting their arrival, including the mother and other close relatives of Orwa Ojode.

== Accident ==
The helicopter had departed Wilson Airport in Nairobi with a full complement of two senior Kenya Police officers as pilots and four passengers on board: the two government officials and two Kenya Police officers acting as their bodyguards. The last radio contact with the helicopter was five minutes after it departed Wilson Airport at 8:32 am local time; and the aircraft then disappeared from radar another five minutes later at 8:42 am. It had crashed into the Kibiku area of the Ngong Forest just outside Nairobi and caught fire. All six occupants were killed in the crash; the aircraft was completely destroyed by the accident, a post-crash fire burning the victims "beyond recognition". Transport Minister Amos Kimunya reported the weather was "normal" at the time of the crash with visibility of 8 kilometres (5.0 mi).

== Aircraft ==
The crashed helicopter, Eurocopter AS350B3e Ecureuil, tail number 5Y-CDT, manufactured in 2011, had flown for less than 100 hours when it entered service with the Kenya Police in January 2012 and had accumulated a further 240 hours' flying time since then. It had been bought to replace old Mil Mi-17 helicopters of the Kenya Police Air Wing.

== Investigation ==
A commission led by Lady Justice Kalpana Rawal was formed to investigate the crash. The commission handed in its report on 28 February 2013. It found that the probable cause of the accident was that the crew lost control of the helicopter in conditions of poor visibility.
