= Nyowita =

- Location within Kenya
- Coordinates: 0.68°S 34.4°E
- Country: Kenya
- County: Homa Bay
- Elevation: 1,335 m (4,380 ft)
- Time zone: UTC+3 (EAT)

Nyowita is a settlement in Homa Bay County, in Kenya's former Nyanza Province. It lies in Kanyamwa Kosewe ward, at an elevation of approximately 1,335 metres. Nyowita lies near Kobodo to the north, Nyawita to the east. and Ndhiwa to the southwest. The nearest airport to the settlement is KIS, located 75.5 km northeast of Nyowita.

== Etymology ==
In Dholuo, nya- (Note: nya- functions as a shortened form of nyar) functions as a prefix meaning 'daughter of' or 'a lady from', While Wita may refer to a person or ancestor. Combined, the name would translate as ‘Daughter of Wita’ or ‘Lady from Wita’.

== Geography ==
=== Climate ===
Nyowita has a tropical savanna climate (Köppen: Aw), with warm temperatures throughout the year and rainfall occurring in all months. April records the highest average rainfall, while February records the lowest.
