= Osogo =

Osogo is a surname of Kenyan origin.

== People with the surname ==
- James Charles Nakhwanga Osogo (1932–2023), Kenyan politician
- John Osogo (1927–1979), Kenyan educationist and historian
- Joyce Osogo, Kenyan politician

== See also ==
- Osogovo
