= Garissa University College =

University in Kenya

Coordinates: 0°27′5″S 39°39′41″E

Garissa University is a public university in Garissa, Kenya. Its charter was awarded on October 23, 2017, by President Uhuru Muigai Kenyatta.

== Overview ==
Garissa University was founded in 2011 as a constituent college of Moi University, in the facilities of the former Garissa Teachers' Training College.

The school's library was established in 1996 as a resource for the former teacher training college. It was later staffed in 2006.

It was the first and only public post-secondary school to offer approved university degree courses in the North Eastern Province. The institution provides courses in the schools of education, information science, and arts and social sciences. It's school motto is " Oasis of innovation".

Garissa University was granted a Charter for fully-fledged university status on 23 October 2017 by President Uhuru Kenyatta.

The Vice-Chancellor is Prof. Ahmed Warfa, the Deputy Vice-Chancellor Principal (Finance & Administration) is Prof. Nganga Stephen Irura, and the Deputy Vice-Chancellor (Academics) is Prof. Hussein A. Golicha. The university has 75 staff members.

== 2015 attack ==
On April 2, 2015, gunmen stormed Garissa University, killing 148 students and wounding 79 or more. The attackers claimed to be from the Al-Shabaab terrorist group and indicated that they were retaliating against non-Muslims occupying Muslim territory. The terrorists took several Christian students hostage, but freed most Muslims. The following day, national and county leaders agreed to suspend courses at the college indefinitely, to allow security services to investigate the attack. Buses were also hired to return students to their homes, and several students insisted they would not return to the university.

Approximately 650 surviving students from the University were absorbed into courses at the main Moi University campus in Eldoret. Jacob Kaimenyi, Kenya's Education cabinet secretary, urged students from the teacher training college to return to the Garissa campus, which was reopened on 5 May 2015 with improved security. However, many students have refused to return. The governor of Homa Bay County, Cyprian Awiti, decided to award KSh. 30,000/= to each of the 16 surviving students from that county to help them overcome their trauma and to make arrangements to attend school in Eldoret.
