= Millie Odhiambo =

Kenyan lawyer and politician

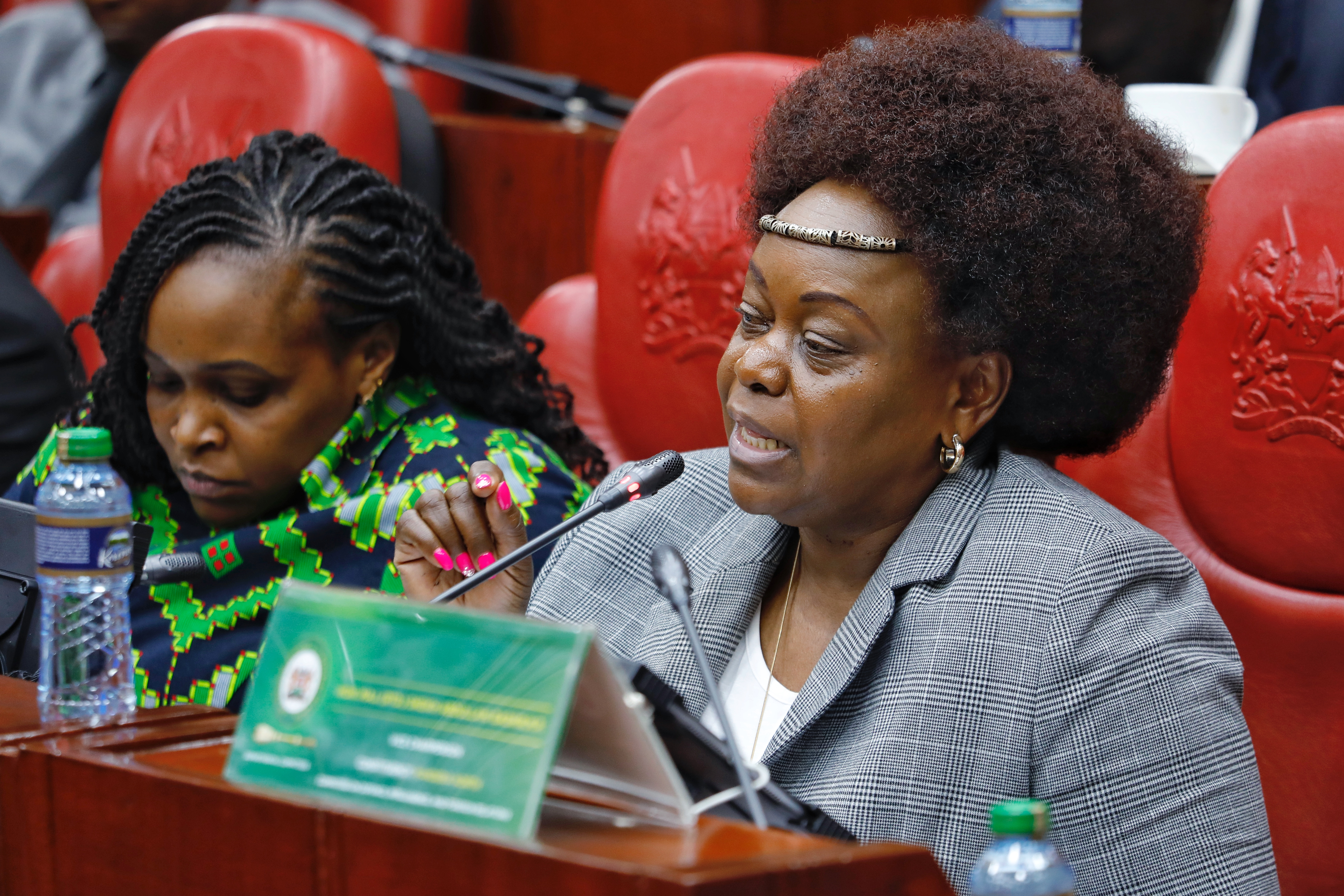
- Millie Odhiambo in 2023

Member of Parliament for Suba North Constituency
- Incumbent
- Assumed office 15 January 2013
- Preceded by: Otieno Kajwang

Personal details
- Born: 1 November 1966 (age 59) Homa Bay, Kenya
- Party: Orange Democratic Movement
- Education: University of Nairobi
- Profession: Lawyer

Millie Grace Akoth Odhiambo Mabona (born 1 November 1966) is a Kenyan politician. She originally trained as a lawyer, and has been a member of parliament since 2008. She was first nominated and later elected as a Member of Suba North Constituency.

== Early life ==
Odhiambo was born in 1966 in Homa Bay to Harrison Odhiambo and Damaris Auma Odhiambo. She is the fourth of eight children. Her father Harrison Odhiambo died in 1973 in a boating accident, a moment that Odhiambo says helped spur her interest in politics.

Millie attended nursery school, St. Francis Girls Secondary School and Limuru Girls High School before she attended the University of Nairobi in 1986. She graduated in 1990 with a Bachelor of Laws degree. She would later study in the United States, Sweden and Italy.

She began her career in the attorney general's office practicing civil litigation before moving on to human rights law, with an emphasis on women and children. In 1999 she served as chairperson of the Coalition on Violence Against Women-Kenya and from 2000 to 2008 was the founder and director of the CRADLE Children's Foundation, an organization working to improve children's rights in the legal system.

== Political career ==
Odhiambo was nominated as a candidate Member of Parliament in 2007 by the Orange Democratic Movement and then elected as a member of the Orange Democratic Movement in the 2013 Kenyan general election. Since taking her seat in Parliament, Kenyan media have described her as "controversial" and "outspoken".

== Personal life ==
Millie married Magugu Mabona of Zimbabwe in 2006.

Odhiambo is a stepmother to Mabona's daughter Lebo, who lives in Botswana. She has been vocal about her struggle growing up with uterine fibroids, which led to both painful menstrual cycles and difficulty conceiving children. Drawing from her personal experience, Millie champions for Assisted Reproductive Technology (ART) Bill 2022, a landmark law creating the nation's first legal framework for services like IVF and surrogacy.

== Publications ==
Her book ""Rig Or Be Rigged? is based on her experiences and that of other women leaders.
