= Ayugis =

Oyugis
- Location within Kenya
- Coordinates: 0.73°S 34.58°E
- Country: Kenya
- Province: Nyanza Province
- Time zone: UTC+3 (EAT)

Oyugis is a settlement in Kenya's Homa Bay County.

== History ==
Before the Kenyan general election in 2013, Oyugis voted as part of the Nyanza Province.
