= Suba Constituency =

Suba constituency could refer to:

- Suba South Constituency
- Suba North Constituency
