= Suba District =

Administrative district in Kenya

Coordinates: 0°20′S 34°12′E

Suba District was an administrative district in the former Nyanza Province of Kenya. Its capital town was Mbita Point. The district had a population of 155,666 and an area of 1,055 km^{2} . Suba district was named after the Suba people, who inhabit local Rusinga and Mfangano Islands.

The district had two constituencies: Mbita Constituency and Gwassi .

In line with the new Kenyan constitution of 2010, Suba district is now part of Homa Bay County.

Local authorities (councils)
Authority	Type	Population*	Urban pop.*
Mbita Point	Town	28,705	6,103
Suba	County	126,961	1,792
Total	-	155,666	7,895
* 1999 census. Source:

Administrative divisions
Division	Population*	Urban population*	Population density	Headquarters
Central	27,574	1,653	90	
Gwassi	47,221	0	142	
Lambwe	18,366	0	132	
Mbita	46,223	5,745	219	Mbita Point
Mfangano	16,282	0	250	
Total	155,666	7,398	148 (average)	
* 1999 census. Sources: , ,
