= Mirogi =

- Location within Kenya
- Coordinates: 0°41′58″S 34°23′8″E
- Country: Kenya
- County: Homa Bay County
- Constituency: Ndhiwa
- Ward: Kanyamwa Kosewe
- Elevation: 1,221 m (4,006 ft)
- Time zone: UTC+3 (EAT)

Mirogi is a settlement in Kanyamwa Kosewe ward, Ndhiwa Sub-County, in Homa Bay County, Kenya. Situated in the western region of the country near the shores of Lake Victoria, it is an agricultural hub and serves as the primary gateway to Ruma National Park.

== Geography ==
Mirogi lies in the Lake Victoria basin, characterized by rolling grasslands and woodland thickets. The landscape includes: - Kanyamwa Escarpment (southeast) - Ruri Hills (north) - Elevation: 1,221 m (4,006 ft) - Located on the Somali Plate within the East African Rift

Climate is tropical monsoon (Am), with distinct wet/dry seasons.

== Governance ==
Administratively part of: - Homa Bay County - Ndhiwa Constituency - Kanyamwa Kosewe Ward

== Economy ==
Key economic activities: - Agriculture (sugarcane, maize, cotton) - Fishing - Tourism (Ruma National Park)

== Infrastructure ==
=== Health ===
- Mirogi Health Centre (Level 3 facility)

=== Education ===
- Mirogi Girls Primary School - St. Joseph's Mukasa Mirogi Girls Secondary School

=== Transport ===
- Road C20 (tarmac) - Road D213 (murram) to Ruma National Park - Nearest airport: Kabunde Airstrip
