= Gladys Wanga =

Kenyan politician

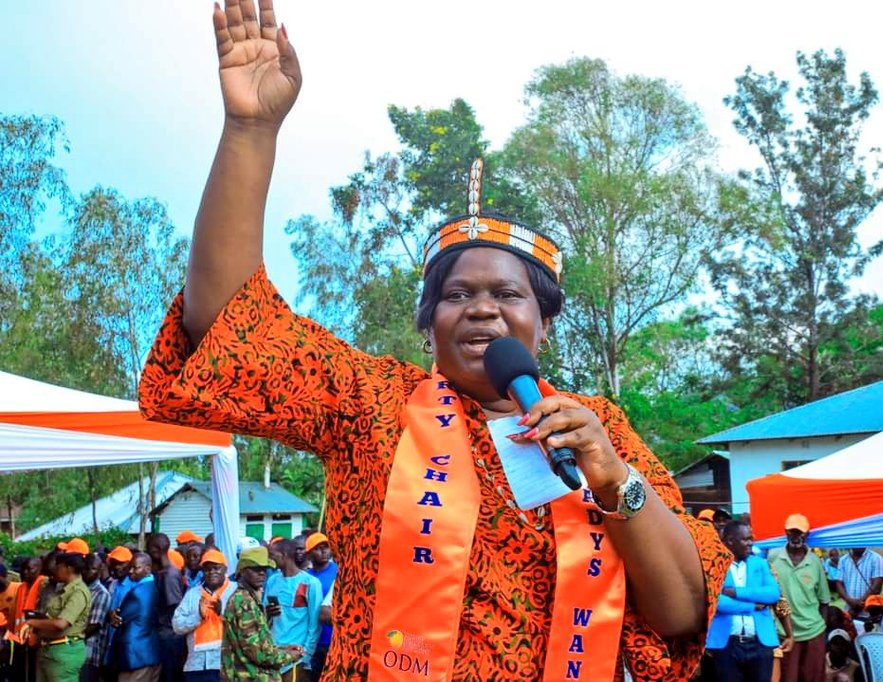
- Wanga in 2024

2nd Governor of Homabay County
- Incumbent
- Assumed office 25 August 2022
- Deputy: Danish Otieno Onyango
- Preceded by: Cyprian Awiti

County Woman Representative for Homabay County
- In office 31 August 2017 – 25 August 2022
- Preceded by: Position established
- Succeeded by: Joyce Bensuda Osogo

Personal details
- Born: Gladys Atieno Nyasuna; 7 March 1981 (age 45) Kisumu, Kisumu District, Nyanza Province, Kenya
- Party: ODM

Gladys Atieno Wanga (née Nyasuna; born 7 March 1981) is a Kenyan politician who is the current Governor of Homa Bay County. She is the first female Governor from the Western Region of the Country and one of the seven female governors elected during the 2022 Kenyan General Election. She previously served as the County Woman Representative of Homa Bay County from 2013 to 2022. She is married to the former non-Executive Chairperson of the Energy and Petroleum Regulatory Authority (EPRA), George Wanga.

== Background and education ==
Gladys grew up in a political family following closely the footsteps of her late father John Nyasuna, who at one point was a renowned councilor in Kisumu County, which was then known as Nyanza Province.

She attended Kisumu Girls High School where she was at one point suspended for making a protest. She obtained her Bachelor's Degree in Health Management from Kenyatta University in 2004 and later on graduated from Kenyatta University in 2012 with a Master's Degree in Health Management. At Kenyatta University, she was the first female to participate and win an elective seat as the General Secretary of the Union of the Students.

== Career ==
In her early career life, Wanga was initially the Program Manager at the Kenyan Trust for African Rock Art formerly Trust for Africa Art before retaining the same role at the Liverpool VCT Care and Treatment. In 2013, Wanga ran for an elective seat for Women Representative at the Homa Bay County where she emerged victorious. In Parliament, Wanga was a member of Departmental Committee on Labour and Social Welfare in Kenya.

On 25 August 2022, she succeeded Cyprian Awiti as the second governor of Homa Bay County.
