= Awach Tende =

- Location within Kenya
- Coordinates: 0.48°S 34.62°E
- Country: Kenya
- Province: Nyanza Province
- Time zone: UTC+3 (EAT)

Awach Tende is a settlement in Kenya's Homa Bay County. Awach Tende is also the name of a river in the Lake Victoria catchment area. Along with Awach Kibuon, it is known as South Awach.

== History ==
Before the Kenyan general election in 2013, Awach voted as part of the Nyanza Province.
