= Kadimu =

- Location within Kenya
- Coordinates: 0.07°S 34.15°E
- Country: Kenya
- Province: Nyanza Province
- Time zone: UTC+3 (EAT)

Kadimu is a settlement in Kenya’s Nyanza Province. It is situated in the western part of the country, a region known for its proximity to Lake Victoria and its predominantly rural landscape. Administratively, Kadimu falls within one of the local counties that make up the former Nyanza Province, which was reorganised under Kenya’s system of devolved government.

The settlement is characterised by small-scale agriculture, which forms the main economic activity in the area, with residents typically engaged in subsistence farming and livestock keeping. Like many rural settlements in the region, Kadimu has access to basic social amenities such as primary education and local markets, while larger services are found in nearby towns.

Nyanza Province, where Kadimu is located, is largely inhabited by the Luo community and has a rich cultural heritage tied to fishing, farming, and trade around Lake Victoria.
