= Karungu =

Karungu Karungu Station, Karunga
- Village
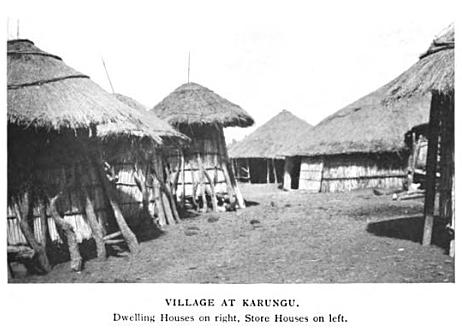

- Location in Kenya
- Coordinates: 00°50′47″S 34°09′17″E
- Country: Kenya
- County: Migori County
- Division: Karungu
- Location: Karungu
- Elevation: 1,200 m (3,900 ft)
- Time zone: UTC+3 (EAT)

Karungu (Karunga) is a village in Kenya on the shore above Lake Victoria, near the frontier with Tanzania. Administratively it is in Karungu Location, Karungu Division, Migori County.

== History ==
Located on the headland overlooking Karungu Bay, the village was originally expected to grow into a bustling port. A stone pier was built in the late 1800s and a customs house, but the project failed due to endemic malaria. The nearby village of Sori eventually surpassed Karungu and became the market town. Nevertheless, Karungu had already given its name to the bay and the administrative division.

In World War I, in September 1914, the Germans, from German East Africa, occupied Karungu after falling back from their attack on Kisi. The steamer Winifred attempted to drive them off but was not successful until joined by the Kavirondo. The Germans retreated back to Shirati.
