= Port Victoria, Kenya =

Port Victoria Bunyala
- Town
- Port Victoria
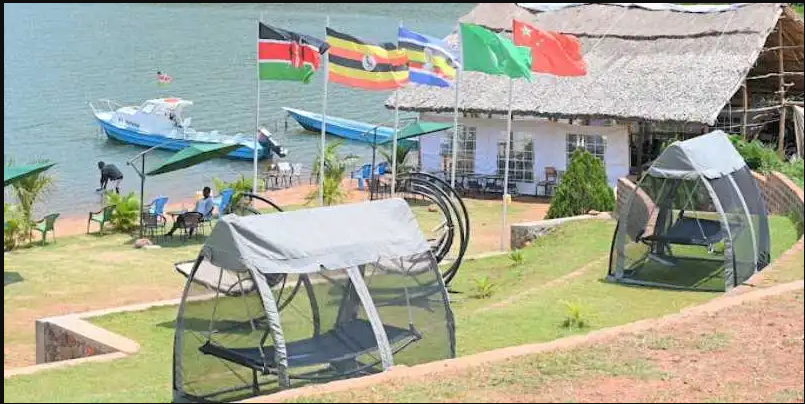
- Che's Bay beach resort in Port Victoria Town-December 2024
- Nickname: Port
- Interactive map of Port Victoria
- Coordinates: 0°06′N 33°59′E
- Country: Kenya
- region: Western
- county: Busia
- Established: 1892
- Named for: Lake Victoria

Government
  - Body: Busia County Government

Area
  - Urban: 2.003 km^{2} (0.773 sq mi)
  - Metro: 192.2 km^{2} (74.2 sq mi)
  - Rank: 4
- Elevation: 1,149 m (3,770 ft)

Population (2019)
  - Town: 12,194
  - Density: 4,222/km^{2} (10,930/sq mi)
  - Metro: 100,000

Time zone
- GMT+3: UTC+3
- Postal code: 50410
- Geocode: (0)55

Port Victoria is a town in Western Kenya, located in the southern part of the country's western region on the shores of Lake Victoria in Busia County on the Kenya-Uganda border. Fishing is the main economic activity of the people in Port Victoria. The town has a population of about 14,000 people(2025 county government estimate) people and is located at an altitude of about 1,149 m (3,770 ft).

Port Victoria is approximately 64 km from Busia town, 115 km from Kisumu city and 468 km from Nairobi, the capital city of Kenya.

== Etymology ==
The town is named after the lake on which it sits, with the lake inheriting the name of the queen of the UK when the British first made it to its shores.

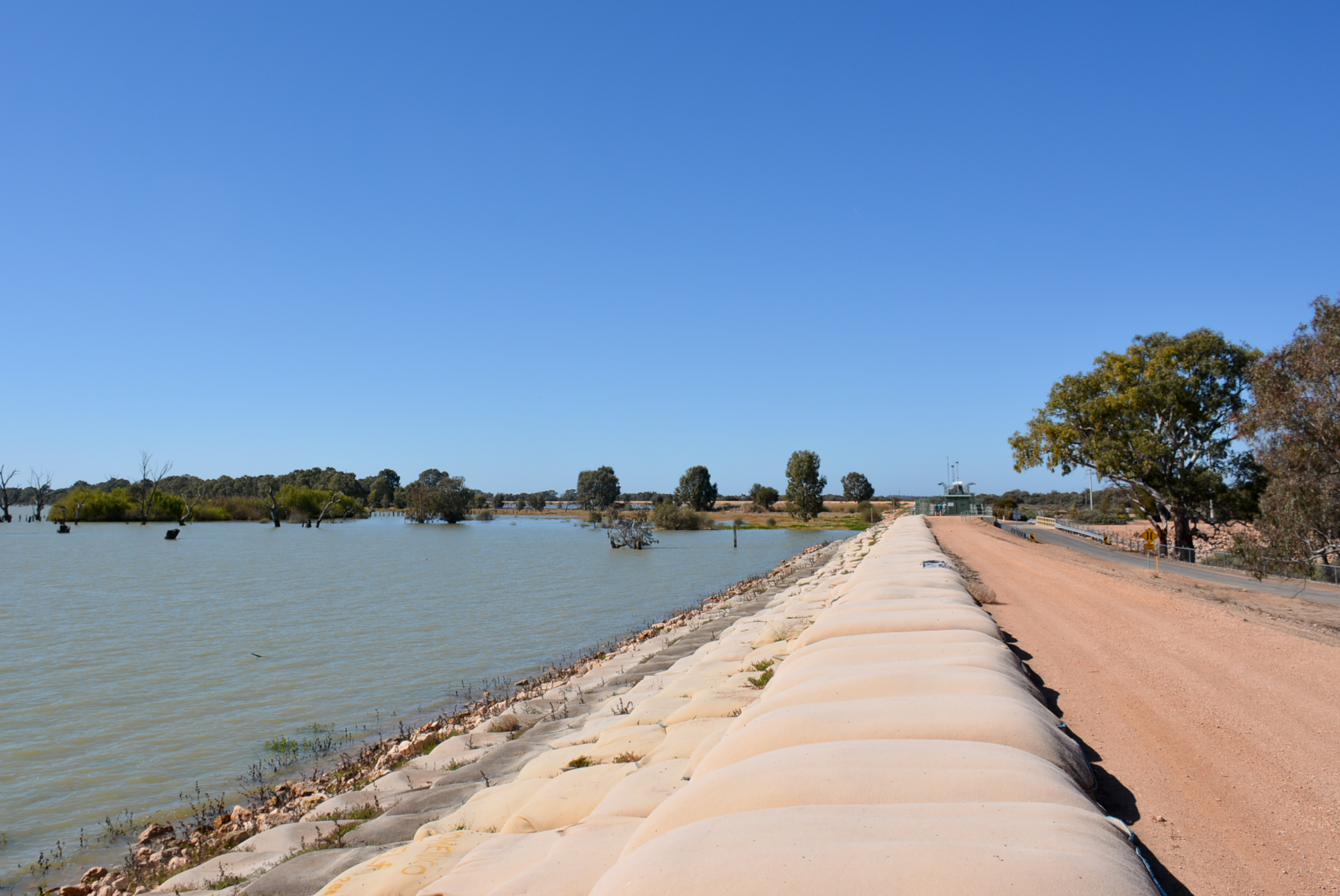
The shores of Lake Victoria

== Administration ==

The town is administered by the Busia county government as part of its constitutional mandate.

== History ==
=== Prehistory ===
The Lake Basin region, including the area where the town is has been inhabited continuously since the late stone age. Before that, humans used to live around the lake whenever it was at its minimum water levels.

=== Precolonial ===
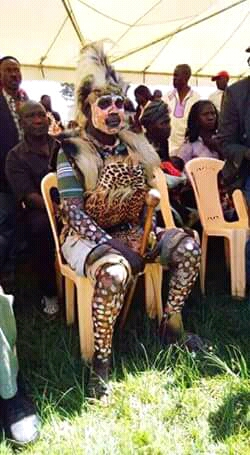
Traditional Luhya clan elder

In the precolonial age, the area was predominantly inhabited by the Abanyala Be Buongo community, a subtribe of the Luhya, just as they do now. They arrived in the area during the great Bantu Migrations, with their fellow Luhya via Uganda, after which they split with fellow members of their subtribe, who went on to form the Abanyala Be Navakholo. Just before the arrival of the whiteman, there seems to have been a massive power struggle between various clans in the region that resulted in a demographic shift according to oral traditions.

=== Colonial and modern ===
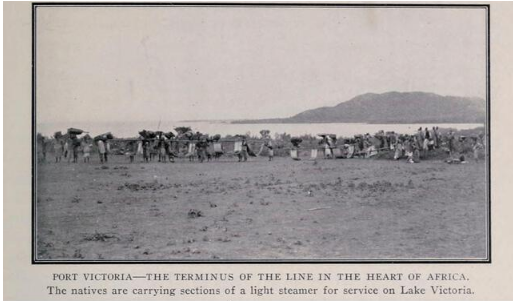
the initial site of the town, with Samia hills and lake victoria in the background

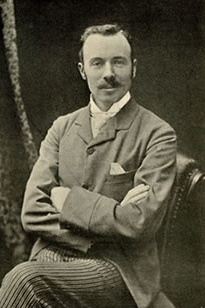
Joseph Thompson

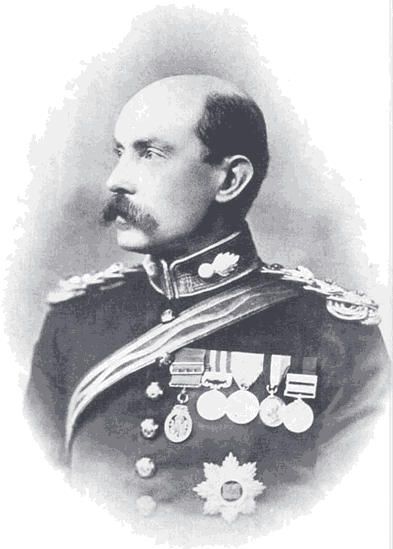
Scottish Engineer James Macdonald

In his 1882-1883 expedition, Joseph Thompson arrived at the current site of the town at the edge of the Samia hills, being the first european explorer to do so. Later, in 1892-1893, the Macdonald railway survey identified the current location of the Town as a good Terminus for the Uganda railway. This spurred growth for the next few years in the area as many stores were set up in the area, and even harbour development plans drawn. However, this prosperity was short-lived as the Blackett survey of 1898 identified an alternative route for the railway through the Nyando valley and Kisumu. However, it still became the terminal for Sclater's road, on December 31^{st} 1896 and a British regiment remained in the town for another 3 years, before eventually leaving. This was when Lieutenant Whitehouse of the Royal Navy was conducting a hydrographic survey of Northern Lake Victoria from the town. This decreased the town's importance and it remained a mere fishing port.Nevertheless, a British steamer, S.S Vice admiral, was launched here as part of the colonial administration's efforts to establish lake steamer transport. As late as 1907, the town was still being reconsidered as a terminal for the Uganda railway due to its relatively deep waters and the poor drainage and unhealthy climate of Kisumu (then port Florence). The Colonial and Modern administrative history of the town is majorly just a history of the surrounding administrative divisions, since the town was never a headquarters on its own. In the 1900s, it was under the North Kavirondo district, ruled by Nabongo Mumia. In 1912, it was placed under Samia location, ruled by Chief Namwonja Mukudi, who was answerable to the area representative, Kadima, Mumia's brother. When Kenya gained independence in 1963, the town was placed under the newly created Busia district, which was later broken down into five subdistricts in 2005 (Bunyala being the one where the town was located) and administered by the Port Victoria Town Council, up until it was dissolved and its duties handed over to the Busia county government in 2013, as per the new constitution of Kenya, 2010.It was during the time of the town council, in 1986, that the Port Victoria forest station was established to conserve wildlife in the area and protect the wildife in the area. in this same time period, in 1977, its water supply system was inaugurated. Recently, the town has started to experience an economic boom due to private and public investments, including the launching of a fish processing site by the President of Kenya in 2023, and the rehabilitation of the Nambengele-Rwambwa-Port Victoria road.

== Geography and climate ==
The average height of the town is 1,149 metres, with a hot and moist climate with annual temperatures of about 21-27°C and average precipitation(rainfall) of about 900 to 1100 mm. It has a varied geography, simultaneously bodering the Samia hills, Lake Victoria, Yala swamp and river Nzoia. The Samia hills are varied, containing acidic lavas(solidified), tuffs, agglomerates, banded quartzite and iron stone.

== Demographics ==
The town is predominantly Luhya of the Abanyala Subtribe, but with a mix of some Luo and other ethnicities from Uganda like Samia and Gisu. estimates place the town proper's population at 14,000 though it serves a hinterland and metropolitan area of about 100,000

== Economy and transport ==
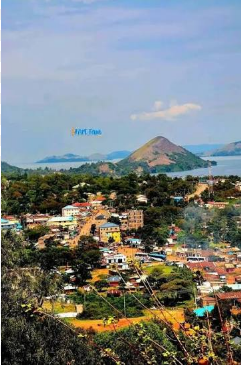
Aerial View of a section of the town

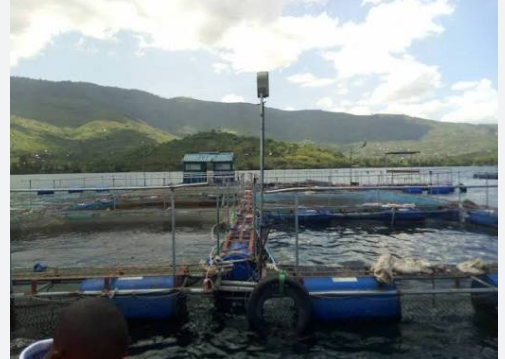
Mulukoba Fish Landing Port

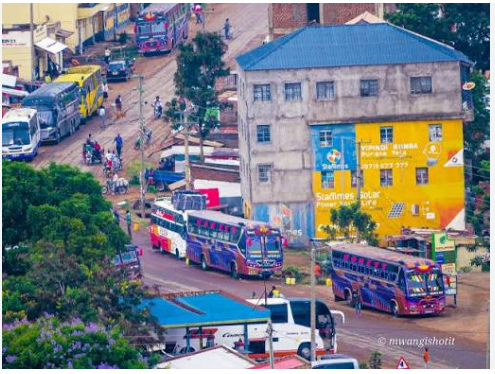
busy road in Port Victoria

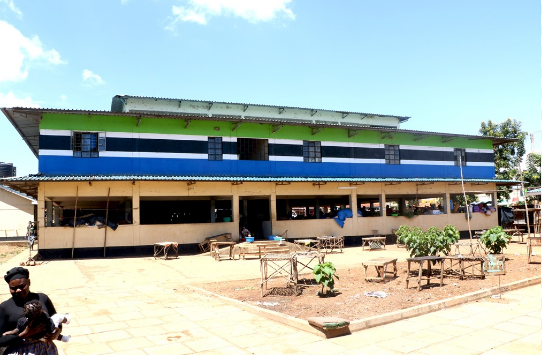
Port Victoria Fresh Food Market

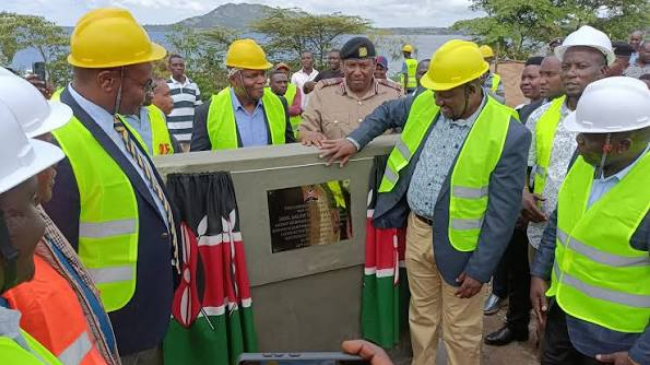

The town's main economic activity is fishing, though other activities like trade and mining are practiced. The national government has invested heavily on fishing, especially with the construction of the multimillion shilling fish processing plant at Mulukoba. Mining of sand is undertaken on the banks of the Nzoia river and trade is carried out mainly at the town market., with fresh food produce like fish and maize being the major goods sold The town is linked to the outside world via land and water, where the Nambengele-Rwambwa-Port Victoria road and the Sigiri bridge are the main land routes out of the town. There's also growing tourism in the area due to the Mumbaka forest reserve and the prestigious Che's bay resort.

== Culture and education ==
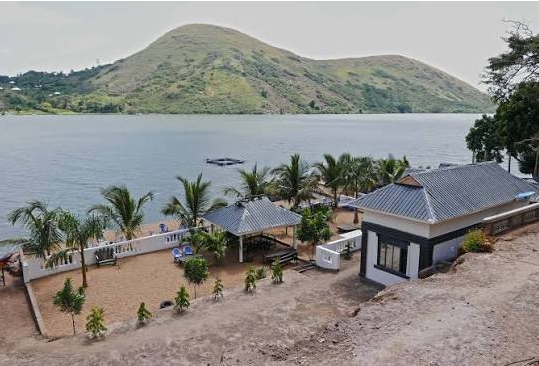
Muhondo Bay, Port Victoria

The Abanyala have their own distinct cultural activities like the clan system and Isambo carnival, which is undertaken at the conclusion of each year, bringing together the various communities in the town. The town also hosts major educational centres like Port Victoria Mixed secondary, St Cecilia primary and Junior School, Lake Breeze Academy, Namenya High School, John Osogo High school and Roshen Academy

== Recreation ==
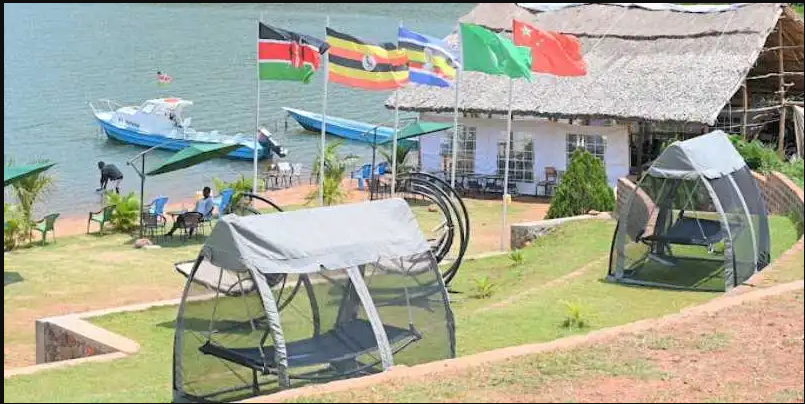

The Isambo festival is the largest cultural and recreational activity in the town. It majorly occurs and Che's bay resort at the end of December, bringing together the many groups in the town plus various stakeholders nationally and internationally, through activities such as an eating competition, Boat racing and Swimming.

== Notable people ==
Ababu Namwamba, Former Cabinet secretary, sports

Raphael Wanjala, Area MP

James Osogo, Former Cabinet secretary

John Osogo, writer, ethnographer, educationalist

Peter Habenga Okondo, Former Cabinet Secretary
