= Silvano Melea Otieno =

Silvano Melea Otieno (1931 – 20 December 1986) was a leading criminal lawyer in Nairobi whose death and burial gave rise to a significant legal controversy regarding the tension between customary and common law in Kenya.

== Biography ==
Otieno was born at Nyalgunga, Nyamila village, Siaya, in Nyanza Province, western Kenya, the seventh of twelve children in a Luo family. He was educated in a mission school, then worked briefly in the courts before joining the nationalist movement, the Kenya African Union, precursor of the Kenya African National Union U). In 1953, he won a scholarship to study law at the University of Bombay. He returned to Kenya in 1960 and was admitted to the bar of the Kenyan High Court in 1961. Otieno was in private practice between 1961 and 1963, but gave up his practice for public service between 1963 and 1968, serving as deputy town clerk in Kisumu and later as principal legal assistant to the East African Common Services Organization. Otieno re-established a private legal practice in Nairobi in 1968, and from then until his death in 1986, built a reputation as an outstanding criminal lawyer.

During his time working in the law courts before qualifying as a lawyer, Otieno had been introduced in the early 1950s to Wambui Waiyaki, later known as Virginia Wambui Waiyaki Otieno by her father, an Inspector in the colonial police force. They met again in 1961, dated and married in August 1963 under the colonial Marriage Act. The couple had five children, Otieno accepted the four of Wambui's children born before their marriage as his own, and he also fostered six orphaned children of a deceased friend. All 15 children were well educated, several attending universities in the United States.

Otieno died suddenly of a heart attack on 20 December 1986.

== Otieno burial case ==
Soon after Otieno's death, Wambui announced that Otieno would be buried on the farm the couple owned jointly at Ngong on the outskirts of Nairobi. However, his burial became a cause célèbre in Kenya when his wife's plans were challenged by his brother, who was his closest adult-male blood relation and the Luo of the Umira Kager clan of Nyanza Province.

Both husband and wife were highly educated Kenyans who had largely turned their backs on their ethnic identities and exemplified an emerging Kenyan bourgeoisie, whereas his brother was a railway foreman, closely associated with the Umira Kager clan. Otieno's relationship with the clan was ambiguous as, despite his westernised lifestyle, he remained a member of his clan association. The case went through several hearings in the Kenyan High Court and Court of Appeal over five months, during which Otieno's corpse remained unburied. The case was an exemplar of the debate between customary (indigenous, ethnic, traditional) law versus the statutory and the (common) law that had been introduced in Kenya during the colonial period and largely retained after independence. Under Kenyan law at that time, a deceased person's will or the wishes of their spouse were not sufficient to determine a dispute between any opposed parties, and the case hinged on whether the relevant Kenyan law on burial was statute, common law or customary law, and who was the next of kin responsible for the funeral rites.

It emerged that ethnic interests still prevailed in Kenyan family and inheritance law. The Court of Appeals ruled that when there is a conflict between common law and customary law, the latter takes precedence. They declared that the courts of Kenya are guided by African customary law, provided that such laws are "not repugnant to justice and morality". The judges concluded that the advocate for Wambui Otieno had failed to demonstrate that traditional Luo burial customs were opposed to justice or morality. In the end, the Nairobi All Saints Cathedral refused to hold the funeral service there, as the clan had desired. Otieno was finally buried at Nyamila on 23 May 1987.

== See also ==
- Luo people of Kenya and Tanzania

== Sources ==
- D S Cohen and E S Odhiambo, (1992). “Burying SM: The Politics of Knowledge and Sociology of Power in Africa” Portsmouth NH, Heinemann.
- E Cotran, (1987). “Casebook on Kenyan Customary Law” Nairobi, Nairobi University Press.
- A Gordon, (1995). “Gender, Ethnicity, and Class in Kenya: "Burying Otieno" Revisited" Signs, Vol. 20, No. 4.
- R J Gehman, (1989). African Traditional Religion in Biblical Perspective, Nairobi, East African Educational Publishers Ltd.
- P Stamp, (1991). “Burying Otieno: The Politics of Gender and Ethnicity in Kenya” Signs: Journal of Women in Culture and Society Vol.16 No.4 pp 808–845.
- N Wamai, (2011). “Tribute to Wambui, a maverick freedom heroine", Daily Nation, 3 September 2011,

.

- S C Wanjala, (1989). “Conflicts of Law and Burial” in J B Ojwang J B and J N K Mugambi (editors) “The SM Otieno Case: Death and Burial in Modern in Kenya” Nairobi, Nairobi University Press.
