= Cyprian Awiti =

Kenyan politician

1st Governor of Homa Bay County
- In office 2013–2022
- President: Uhuru Kenyatta
- Succeeded by: Gladys Wanga

Personal details
- Born: 14 December 1952 (age 73) Homa Bay County
- Party: Orange Democratic Movement
- Profession: Politician

Cyprian Achilaus Otieno Awiti (born December 14, 1952, in Homa Bay County) is a Kenyan politician who served as the first governor of Homa Bay County from 2013 to 2022. He is a member of Orange Democratic Movement and a member of Coalition for Reforms and Democracy.

== Early life and education ==
Awiti was born in Rachuonyo Sub County, Homa Bay County in Kenya. Awiti attended his primary school at Mawego Primary School in Rachuonyo. He then attended Mawego Secondary school. He then studied Electrical engineering at Mombasa Technical Training Institute. In 1984 he enrolled into the University of Manchester studying Management Administration and graduated in 1987 with a Master of Education.

== Career ==
Awiti began his career working for Kenya's Ministry of Public Works as an Electrical Inspector, he left after a few years and began working at Mombasa Polytechnic as a Senior lecturer. In 1993, he was appointed country director at Marie Stopes Kenya where he served there till 2010. In 2013 he was elected Governor of Homa Bay County.

== Controversy ==
On July 14, 2015, Cyprian Awiti was summoned by the Senate Committee on County Public Accounts to explain how he spent Sh11.8 million on renovation of the Governor's office through a tender given through restrictive process few days after his assumption of office.
