= Agustino Neto =

Kenyan politician and lawyer

Agostinho Neto Oyugi is a Kenyan politician and lawyer who was elected Member of Parliament for the Ndhiwa Constituency, running on an ODM ticket, in a by-election in September 2012. He served the people Ndhiwa till August 2017 where he improved the roads, schools, healthcare etc. He started the National Schools Bursary programme in Ndhiwa where homegrown students who managed to secure a place in a national school would be awarded Kshs 50,000 annually to cater for their school fees. He was among a group of activists that filed a case In Kenya's High Court attempting to disqualify Uhuru Kenyatta and William Ruto from contesting in Kenya's general Election of 2013. He is currently the co-party leader of United Green Movement (UGM) a party that promises total inclusivity.
