= Ngia =

- Location within Kenya
- Coordinates: 0.04°N 34.37°E
- Country: Kenya
- Province: Nyanza Province
- Time zone: UTC+3 (EAT)

Ngia is a settlement in Kenya's Nyanza Province.
