= Moses Otieno Kajwang =

Kenyan politician

Senator Moses Otieno Kajwang
- Born: 2 February 1979 (age 47); Homa Bay, Kenya
- Education: Master of Information Technology
- Alma mater: Moi University, Makerere University
- Occupations: Politician and Scientist (ICT)
- Organization: Parliament of Kenya
- Known for: Renown for public finance oversight having been a long serving Chair of Public Accounts Committee. Also Convenes the Climate Change Caucus in the Senate.
- Predecessor: Senator Gerald Otieno Kajwang
- Political party: ODM
- Children: 2

Moses Otieno Kajwang (born 2 February 1979) is the second elected Senator for Homa Bay County in Kenya and a member of the Orange Democratic Movement. He was elected on 12 February 2015 in a by election that was occasioned by the death of his brother Gerald Otieno Kajwang. He was re-elected in 2017 for a second term and in 2022 for a third term.

Born into a family of politicians, his elder brother Gerald Otieno Kajwang served as a member of parliament for seventeen years and was a minister for Immigration for a period of five years under the Grand Coalition Government. He died on 18 November 2014. His other brother Thomas Joseph Kajwang' is a member of Parliament representing Ruaraka Constituency in Nairobi for the third term, while his brother Peter Kajwang’ is the elected member of county assembly (MCA) for Kaptembwo Ward in Nakuru County for the second term.

Prior to his political debut, he spent thirteen years in the financial services and supply chain industries. He was the head of Information technology at the ICEA LION Insurance Group and was responsible for implementing and managing information systems in the General Insurance division. Before this he was in charge of ICT at DHL Supply Chain where he was responsible for automating supply chains in diverse industries including telecommunications, manufacturing and pharmaceuticals. He also worked at UAP Insurance in Uganda where he was Head of ICT and Quality Assurance.

He is the Chairman of the Senate Public Accounts Committee, a position that he has held for the second time in two terms

He is also the Convener of the Senate Climate Change Caucus and represented parliament at the 27th Conference of Parties (COP27) in Sharm el Sheikh in Egypt. He is a member of the Senate Roads Committee and the Senate Agriculture Committee.

He holds a Master of Information Technology from Makerere University in Uganda and a Bachelor of Science degree in Information Sciences from Moi University in Kenya He is enrolled in the Master of Public Policy Management programme at Strathmore University in Kenya. He is a member of the British Computer Society and an alumnus of Lenana School and Langata Road Primary School in Nairobi, Kenya.

While an undergraduate at Moi University, he was the Secretary General of the Moi University Students Organisation (MUSO), the Chairman of the Moi University Students Elections Board and the Treasurer of the Information Sciences Students Association. He was the Headboy and best student in primary school examinations (KCPE) at Langata Road Primary School in 1992.
