= Nyamware =

Place in Kisumu County, Kenya

- Location within Kenya
- Coordinates: 0.18°S 34.8°E
- Country: Kenya
- Province: Nyanza Province
- Time zone: UTC+3 (EAT)

Nyamware is a settlement in Kenya's Nyanza Province. It is located in Nyamware South Sub-Location, Kochieng West Location, Kadibo Division, Nyando Constituency, Kisumu County. Settlement in this area dates back to 1867. It serves as a beach along one of the tributaries of the Nyando River. Fishing and rice farming are the main economic activities in the area. Buyers come as far as Kisumu town to purchase fish from traders. Some of the common fish species found in the area include omena (silver cyprinid), mbuta (Nile perch), tilapia (ng'ege), kamongo (mudfish), and mumi (catfish), among others.

Beach management, commonly referred to as BM by locals, provides administrative functions alongside the area assistant chief and chief. The current chief is Mark Dero Nyadianga. In the past, the area was inaccessible during the rainy season; however, following devolution, a murram road was constructed from Alendu Shopping Centre, making Nyamware more accessible.

Adjacent to the beach is the West Kano Irrigation Scheme, which stretches as far as Kabonyo and Nduru Beach. Besides fishing and rice farming, small-scale vegetable farming is also common in the area.
