= Rangwe Constituency =

Kenyan electoral constituency

Rangwe
- constituency for the Parliament of Kenya
- Rangwe Constituency within Homa Bay County

- Homa Bay County within Kenya
- County: Homa Bay
- Population: 117732
- Area: 274 km^{2} (105.8 sq mi)

Current constituency
- Number of members: 1
- Party: ODM
- Member of Parliament: Lillian Gogo
- Wards: 4

Rangwe Constituency is an electoral constituency in Kenya. It is one of eight constituencies in Homa Bay County. It was established for the 1988 general elections.

== Members of Parliament ==
Elections	MP	Party	Notes
1988	Joseph Muga Ouma	KANU	One-party system.
1990	Ray O. Ndong’	KANU	By-election. One-party system.
1992	Joseph Muga Ouma	Ford-Kenya	
1997	Shem O. Ochuodho	NDP	
2002	Philip Okoth Okundi	NARC	
2007	Martin Otieno Ogindo	ODM	
2013	George Oner	ODM	
2017	Lilian Gogo	ODM	The first woman MP in the constituency
2022	Lilian Gogo	ODM	The first MP to be re-elected for a second term since 1992

== Wards ==
Wards
Ward	Registered Voters	Local Authority
East Gem	11,592	Homa Bay county
West Gem	10,743	Homa Bay county
Kagan	14,273	Homa Bay county
Kochia	15,908	Homa Bay county
Total	52,516	
*September 2005.
