= Lilian Gogo =

Kenyan politician

Member of the National Assembly
- Incumbent
- Assumed office 2017
- Preceded by: George Oner
- Constituency: Rangwe Constituency

Personal details
- Party: Orange Democratic Movement
- Education: Egerton University

Lilian Achieng Gogo is a Kenyan politician from the Orange Democratic Movement (ODM). She represents the Rangwe Constituency in the National Assembly.

In the 2017 Kenyan general election she became the first woman to be elected MP for the constituency.

Gogo holds a PhD and Master's Degree in Food Science from Egerton University.

== See also ==
- 12th Parliament of Kenya
- 13th Parliament of Kenya
