= Bonyunyu =

- Location within Kenya
- Coordinates: 0.52°S 34.88°E
- Country: Kenya
- Province: Nyanza Province

Population (2016)
  - City: 2,000
  - Density: 40/km^{2} (100/sq mi)
  - Urban: 200
  - Metro: 1,800
- Time zone: UTC+3 (EAT)

Bonyunyu is a settlement in Kenya's Nyanza Province. Bonyunyu market is found in Boisanga sublocation, Itibo ward, Nyamira north district, North mugirango constituency The market was founded in earlier 1994 but it boomed at around 2015 due to the opening of Ekerubo Gietai institute.. The village is inhabited by majority of Abagusii people of Mugirango Clan, Bomorendi and Kibaru sub clans. Other clans from neighboring regions of Bosaragei, Bonyakoni are moving in to complement the population. Other Kenyan tribes such as Luo, Luyha and Maasai are coming to supplement their culture due to students population who comes from different parts of the country. The social economic features of the village include farming, brick making, tea farming, dairy farming, business among other small scale activities. The mode of transportation is mainly by Boda Boda. The village has good network of roads but still remains murramed.

The main families inhabiting the village include: Ndege family, Onunda family, Ndubi Family, Sese family, Orogo family Motanya family Kianyaga family Nyanchongi family, Monda family, and Gitaga family. The village is growing rapidly and is becoming a major urban center after Ekerenyo and Ikonge in the North Mugirango constituency. The students population from Ekerubo Gietai technical training and vocational centre has greatly boosted the status of the village. Students from across the country are now living and have integrated into the society. Swahili has become a second language after native ekegusii.
