= Magunga =

- Location within Kenya
- Coordinates: 0.68°S 34.15°E
- Country: Kenya
- Province: Nyanza Province
- Time zone: UTC+3 (EAT)

Magunga is a settlement in Kenya's Nyanza Province.
