= Bar Olengo =

- Location within Kenya
- Coordinates: 0°N 34.2°E
- Country: Kenya
- Province: Nyanza Province
- Time zone: UTC+3 (EAT)

Bar Olengo is a settlement in Kenya, located at South East Alego Ward, Siaya County.
