= Peter Kaluma =

Kenyan politician

Peter Kaluma MP

Member of Parliament for Homa Bay Town
- Incumbent
- Assumed office 9 August 2022
- Preceded by: Joseph Oyugi Magwanga

Personal details
- Party: Orange Democratic Movement

George Peter Pondo Kaluma is a Kenyan politician who is currently a member of the National Assembly for the Homa Bay Town Constituency, representing the Orange Democratic Movement.

He graduated from Ndiru Primary School in 1990 and St. Joseph's High School in 1994. He earned a Bachelor of Laws (LL.B) in 2000 and Master of Law (LL.M) in 2008 from University of Nairobi.
