= Lambwe =

Lambwe derives its name from Lambwe Valley, a group of valleys that lie inside Ruma National Park. Its a settlement Scheme in an area (class L - Area) in Homa Bay County found in the former Nyanza Province, Kenya (Africa) with the region font code of Africa/Middle East. It is located at an elevation of 1,107 meters above sea level.The region has been for decades infested with tsetse flies.
