= Isambo Carnival =

Cultural festival in Kenya

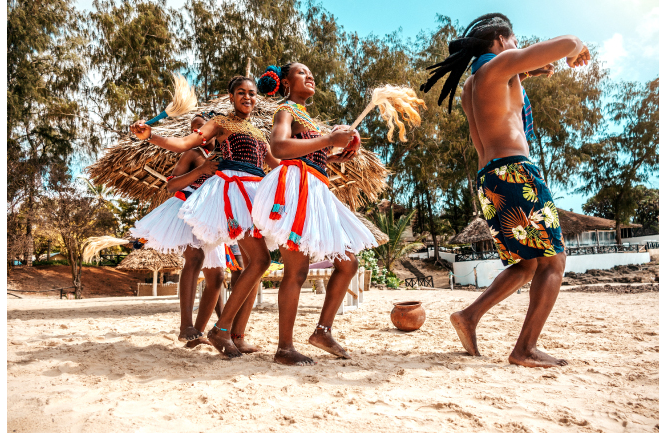
Dancers at Isambo Beach Carnival

Isambo International Beach Carnival (also Isambo Beach Festival, Isambo Beach Carnival) is an annual cultural festival among the Abanyala subtribe of the Abaluhya tribe of western Kenya undertaken at the end of each year, usually during Christmas season, from just before Christmas to the beginning of the new year. It takes place along the beaches of the lakeside town of Port Victoria, in Busia County.

== Etymology ==
"Isambo" means "happy" or "celebration" in Luhya, this is a direct reference to the celebrations undertaken by the community during the carnival

== History ==
The event was held for the first time in December 2014, to bring closer the various groups residing in Port Victoria the area. It has been held continuously at the end of each year ever since. On December 22, 2019, for the first time since its debut, it hosted a high-ranking state official, the then deputy president of the republic of Kenya, William Samoei Arap Ruto. The event is mainly sponsored by the foreign CAS, Ababu Namwamba, who owns the Che's bay resort.

== Activities ==
A wide variety of activities are carried during the event, these include; boat racing, Kayaking, swimming, Fishing sports, beach football, volleyball, traditional dance, food eating competition and wrestling

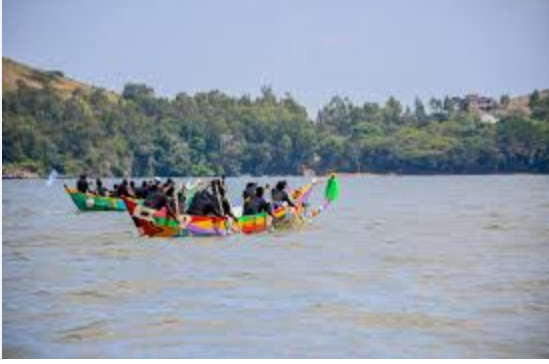

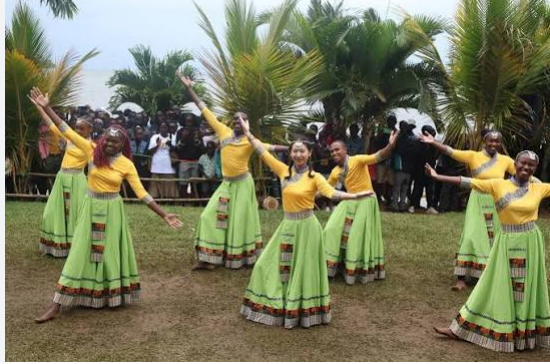

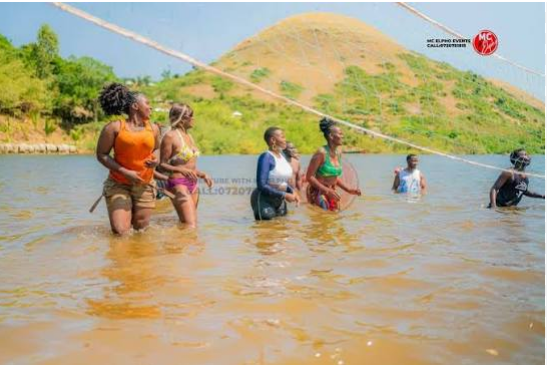

There are also Live music performances of cultural songs and modern age music. A mrs and mr Isambo beauty pageant takes place at the end plus a modern dance performance. The winner enters the roll of honour as an Isambo carnival ambassador, after which they are taken for an all expense paid trip in Abu Dhabi and Dubai by the sponsors of the event

== Dates ==
The event occurs from just before Christmas to the beginning of the New year.

== Entry and venue ==
The event is usually hosted along the beaches in Port Victoria, such as Bukoma and Marenga. The opening ceremony at Lunyofu grounds is free. However, subsequent activities, are hosted at Che's bay for a gate fee of KSH 500 for premium dates. Che's bay resort is bordered by the Singwa and Mwita Fubu hills, at Bukoma beach.
