= Lady Whitehouse =

- Location within Kenya
- Coordinates: 0.1°S 34.75°E
- Country: Kenya
- Province: Nyanza Province
- Time zone: UTC+3 (EAT)

Lady Whitehouse is a settlement in Kenya's Nyanza Province.

== Languages ==
The predominant language in Nyanza is Dholuo, a Nilotic language whose origins are from Southern Sudan, spoken by the Luo.

Other languages include Gusii, Luhya, Kuria, Suba and the national languages English and Swahili. Other languages from the many Kenyan communities are also spoken in small pockets by migrants from these communities.
