= Homa Bay Town Constituency =

Homa Bay Town
- constituency
- Country: Kenya

Homa Bay Town is a constituency in Kenya. It is one of eight constituencies in Homa Bay County.

== Members of Parliament ==
Election
Member of Partliament
Party
Session
2017
Peter Opondo Kaluma
ODM
12th Parliament (2017 - 2027)
2022
Joyce Osogo
ODM

Women Representative

13th Parliament (2022 - 2027)
