= Buholo =

- Location within Kenya
- Coordinates: 0.19°N 34.33°E
- Country: Kenya
- Province: Nyanza Province
- Time zone: UTC+3 (EAT)

Buholo is a settlement in Kenya's Nyanza Province. Its main industry is tourism, mostly due to the savanna and the history of the area.
