= Nyabera =

- Location within Kenya
- Coordinates: 0.6°S 34.73°E
- Country: Kenya
- Province: Nyanza Province
- Time zone: UTC+3 (EAT)

Nyabera is a settlement in Kenya's Nyanza Province and has an elevation of 1,218 meters. The name Nyabera originated from Africa and is commonly used among the Luo community in Kenya.
