= Mutet =

- Location within Kenya
- Coordinates: 0.03°S 34.75°E
- Country: Kenya
- County: Kisumu County
- Time zone: UTC+3 (EAT)

Mutet is a settlement in Kisumu county, Kenya. Mutet lies northeast of Gambogi, which itself is north of the city of Kisumu and eastern Lake Victoria.

Kisumu county was formerly territory within the Nyanza Province before the 2010 Constitution of Kenya.
