= Government of National Unity (Kenya) =

The Government of National Unity, also known as the "grand coalition cabinet," was a designation for the coalition government in Kenya from April 2008 to April 2013. It was formed through negotiations between the Orange Democratic Movement's leader and presidential candidate Raila Odinga and Party of National Unity's leader and incumbent presidential candidate Mwai Kibaki in the aftermath of the 2007–2008 Kenyan crisis which had followed the controversial 2007 presidential election.

Kibaki continued serving as the president while Odinga accepted a non-executive prime ministerial post. The cabinet constituted a record 40 ministers and 52 deputy ministers from different political parties. The deal for the creation of the cabinet was finalized on 13 April 2008, followed by the appointment of Odinga as prime minister on 14 April and the swearing-in of all members of the cabinet on 17 April.

== Cabinet ==
Party key	Party of National Unity
Party key	Orange Democratic Movement
Party key	Wiper Democratic Movement – Kenya
Party key	Kenya African National Union

Acronyms	PO	President's Office
Acronyms	PMO	Prime Minister's Office
Acronyms	VPO	Vice President's Office

Government of National Unity (13 April 2008)
Portfolio	Officeholder
President; Commander-in-chief of the Armed Forces	Mwai Kibaki
Prime Minister	Raila Odinga
Vice President and Minister of Home Affairs	Kalonzo Musyoka
Deputy Prime Minister and Minister of Trade	Uhuru Kenyatta
Deputy Prime Minister and Minister of Local Government	Musalia Mudavadi
PO: Minister of State for Provincial Administration and Internal Security	George Saitoti
PO: Minister of State for Defence	Mohamed Yusuf Haji
PMO: Minister of State for Planning, National Development and Vision 2030	Wycliffe Oparanya
PMO: Minister of State for Public Service	Dalmas Otieno
VPO: Minister of State for Immigration and Registration of Persons	Otieno Kajwang
VPO: Minister of State for National Heritage & Culture	William Ole Ntimama
Minister of East African Community	Amason Kingi
Minister of Foreign Affairs	Moses Wetangula
Minister of Finance	Amos Kimunya
Minister of Justice, National Cohesion and Constitutional Affairs	Martha Karua
Minister of Nairobi Metropolitan Development	Mutula Kilonzo
Minister of Roads	Kipkalya Kones
Minister of Public Works	Chris Obure
Minister of Transport	Chirau Ali Mwakwere
Minister of Water and Irrigation	Charity Ngilu
Minister of Regional Development Authorities	Fred Gumo
Minister of Information & Communications	Samuel Poghisio
Minister of Energy	Kiraitu Murungi
Minister of Lands	James Orengo
Minister of Environment and Mineral Resources	John Michuki
Minister of Forestry and Wildlife	Noah Wekesa
Minister of Tourism	Najib Balala
Minister of Agriculture	William Ruto
Minister of Livestock Development	Mohammed Kuti
Minister of Fisheries Development	Paul Otuoma
Minister of Development of Northern Kenya and other Arid Lands	Ibrahim Elmi Mohamed
Minister of Cooperatives Development	Joseph Nyagah
Minister of Industrialization	Henry Kosgey
Minister of Housing	Soita Shitanda
Minister of Special Programmes	Naomi Shabaan
Minister of Gender and Children Affairs	Esther Murugi Mathenge
Minister of Public Health and Sanitation	Beth Mugo
Minister of Medical Services	Peter Anyang Nyong'o
Minister of Labour	John Munyes
Minister of Youth and Sports	Helen Jepkemoi
Minister of Education	Sam Ongeri
Minister of Higher Education, Science and Technology	Sally Kosgei
Also attending Cabinet meetings
Attorney General	Amos Wako
