= Ruma National Park =

National park Nyanza Province, Kenya

- Hifadhi ya Taifa ya Ruma
- IUCN category II (national park)
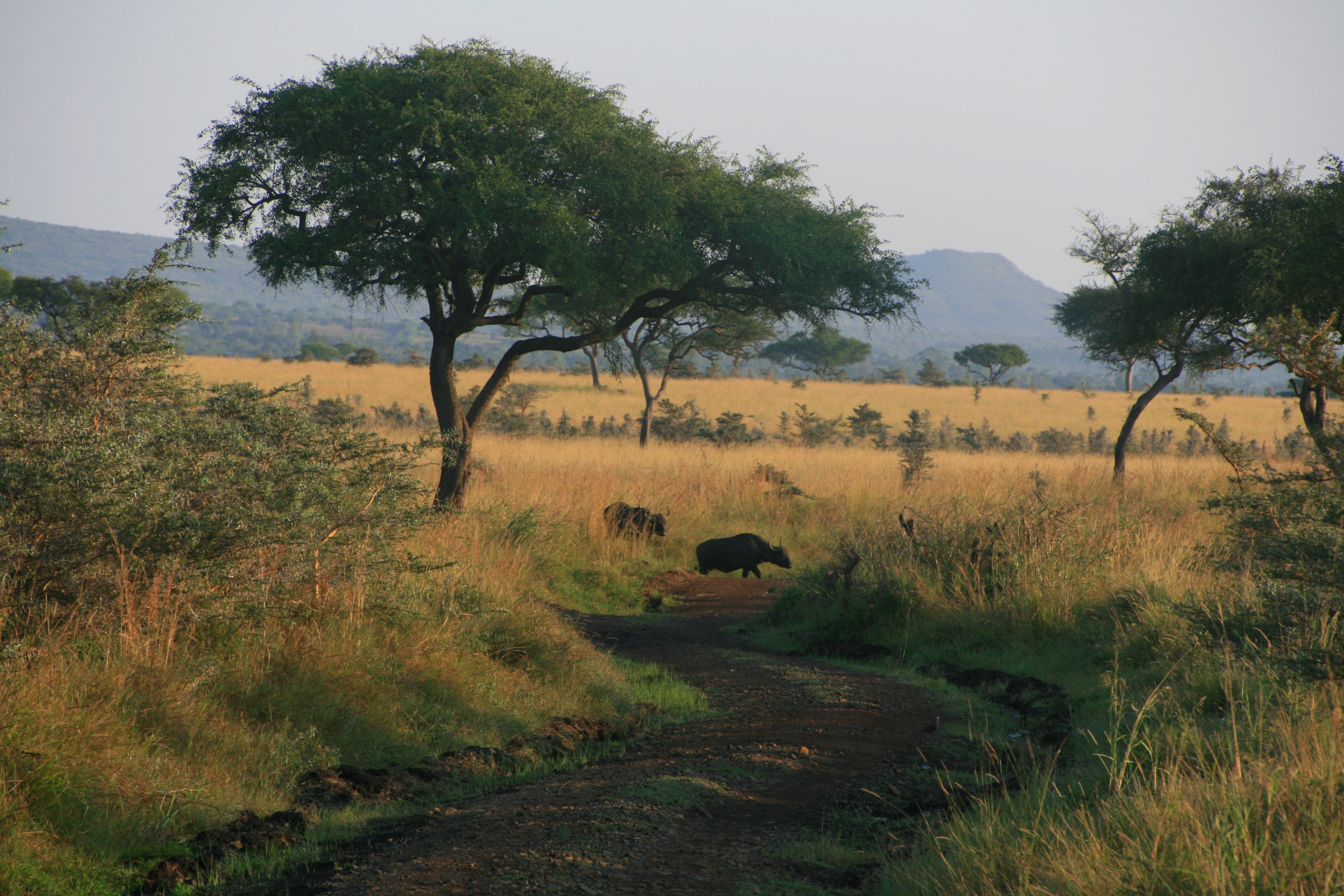
- Cape buffaloes at Ruma National Park, August 2014

- Location within Kenya
- Location: Nyanza Province, Kenya
- Nearest city: Homa Bay
- Coordinates: 0°38′36″S 34°16′48″E
- Area: 120 km^{2} (46 sq mi)
- Established: Gazetted in 1983
- Governing body: Kenya Wildlife Service
- Website: www.kws.org/parks/parks_reserves/RUNP.html

Ruma National Park is the only terrestrial park in Kenya's Nyanza Province. Dubbed the "Last Retreat of the Roan Antelope", the park protects the only indigenous population of rare roan antelopes within Kenya. At present, the population is on the verge of extinction with individual populations numbering approximately 40. The park was established in 1067 as Lambwe Valley Game Reserve. It was later renamed “Ruma” after one of Kenya's most powerful wizard, the much feared Gor Mahia who lived around the park (affiliated to Gor Mahia F.C.). The park is located in the vast Lambwe Valley.

== Wildlife ==
Game species range from African leopards (Panthera pardus pardus), roan antelopes (Hippotragus equinus), eastern black rhinoceros (Diceros bicornis michaeli), Rothschild's giraffes (Giraffa camelopardalis rothschildi), oribis (Ourebia ourebi), cape buffalos, Lelwel hartebeests (Alcelaphus buselaphus lelwel), olive baboons, Bohor reedbucks (Redunca redunca), hyenas, servals (Leptailurus serval), topis (Damaliscus korrigum), honey badgers (Mellivora capensis), bushpigs (Potamochoerus larvatus) and vervet monkeys among others.

Over 400 species of birds have been recorded in the park, making it an Important Bird Area. The rare intra-African migrant, the blue swallow (Hirundo atrocaerulea) is one such avian species.

== Park entry and charges ==
The park is accessible from two gates, the Main Gate (Kamato Gate) and Nyatoto Gate. Payment is cashless

== See also ==
- List of national parks of Kenya
