= Killing of Irvo Otieno =

2023 police killing in Virginia, U.S.

- Date: March 6, 2023
- Time: ≈ 4:00 p.m.-7:28 p.m. (EST)
- Location: Central State Hospital, Dinwiddie County, Virginia, U.S.; 37.20971°N 77.45175°W
- Deaths: Irvo Otieno
- Accused: Randy Boyer; Dwayne Bramble; Jermaine Branch; Bradley Disse; Tabitha Levere; Brandon Rodgers; Kaiyell Sanders; Darian Blackwell; Wavie Jones; Sadarius Williams
- Charges: Second-degree murder

On March 6, 2023, 28-year-old Irvo Otieno died after he was restrained by Henrico County sheriff's deputies and hospital employees at Central State Hospital in Dinwiddie County, Virginia, near Petersburg. He was arrested on March 3 for a suspected breaking and entering, and was taken to the hospital three days later after he was found naked in his cell. A total of ten people, seven deputies and three hospital employees, were charged with second-degree murder in connection with Otieno's death.

== People involved ==
Irvo Otieno (/aɪvoʊ/ EYE-voh); referred to as Ivor by his family, was a 28-year-old man born in Kenya. He experienced mental illness during his last year of high school and had previously received mental health care.

The seven Henrico County Sheriff's deputies allegedly involved in his death were identified as Randy Boyer, Dwayne Bramble, Jermaine Branch, Bradley Disse, Tabitha Levere, Brandon Rodgers, and Kaiyell Sanders. The three hospital employees were identified as Darian Blackwell, Wavie Jones, and Sadarius Williams.

== Arrest and death ==
On March 3, police were called to a home in Henrico County for a reported breaking and entering, where a woman told police she believed her home was burglarized. Police arrested Otieno at the scene and placed him under an emergency custody order. He was taken to Parham Doctors' Hospital for an evaluation; during the evaluation, he allegedly became combative towards officers before being transported to Henrico County Jail.

Three days later, on March 6, deputies transported Otieno to Central State Hospital after he was found naked and covered in feces in his cell. During the intake process, Otieno "became combative during the admission process", according to Dinwiddie County Commonwealth's Attorney, Ann Cabell Baskervill. Deputies and hospital employees restrained Otieno, who became unresponsive and died. Deputies and Otieno arrived just before 4 p.m., and Virginia State Police were called to investigate his death around 7:30 p.m. Cabell Baskervill stated that Otieno was held on the ground in handcuffs and leg irons for twelve minutes. She also said that Otieno's death was not reported for three and a half hours, and when it was reported, Otieno's body had been moved, his handcuffs removed and washed, and a call had been made to a funeral home instead of the medical examiner's office.

== Investigation and criminal charges ==
On March 14, seven Henrico County deputies were charged with second-degree murder. Two days later, three hospital employees were also charged with murder. A preliminary autopsy found Otieno's cause of death to be asphyxiation by smothering. On April 3, the Office of the Chief Medical Examiner of Virginia confirmed the death as a homicide and induced by positional and mechanical asphyxia with restraints.

On March 20, The Washington Post obtained and released surveillance videos of Otieno's death. The video shows Otieno being taken into the hospital on March 6 around at 4:16pm in handcuffs and legcuffs and entering the admissions area at 4:19pm. Just before 4:28pm, according to the Washington Post, he "appears to make a movement" and deputies and hospital staff restrain him, with eight people on top of him and others helping to hold him down. At 4:40pm they release him and according to the Washington Post he "appears not to be moving". At 4:41pm he is given an injection and resuscitation efforts start; at 5:48pm a hospital staffer covers his body with a sheet.

The Dinwiddie County grand jury confirmed probable cause for a prosecution on March 21.

In April, the prosecution filed a joinder motion which was rejected the following month for at least two of the accused hospital workers.

In June, the charges against two of the hospital workers were dropped, as their trial had been kept separate from the others and the footage did not provide strong evidence against them.

== Aftermath ==
Otieno's family hired attorney Ben Crump.

The Reverend Al Sharpton delivered Otieno's eulogy at his funeral.

== See also ==
- List of unarmed African Americans killed by law enforcement officers in the United States
- Killing of Patrick Lyoya
