= Martin Otieno Ogindo =

Kenyan politician

Member of the National Assembly of Kenya
- In office 2007–2013
- Preceded by: Philip Okundi
- Succeeded by: George Oner
- Constituency: Rangwe Constituency

Personal details
- Party: Green Congress of Kenya
- Occupation: Politician
- Known for: Parliamentary Budget Committee leadership
- Committees: Chairman of the Fiscal Analysis and Appropriations Committee (later renamed Budget Committee in 2009)

Martin Otieno Ogindo is a Kenyan politician. He belongs to the Green Congress of Kenya and was elected to represent the Rangwe Constituency in the National Assembly of Kenya since the 2007 Kenyan parliamentary election. During this period, Ogindo was the Chairman of the Fiscal Analysis and Appropriations Committee of the Kenyan Parliament. The committee was renamed the Budget Committee on April 28, 2009. Martin Otieno Ogindo contested again in the August 2022 general elections for the Homa Bay town parliamentary seat and lost to Peter Kaluma Opondo.
