= Joyce Osogo =

Kenyan politician

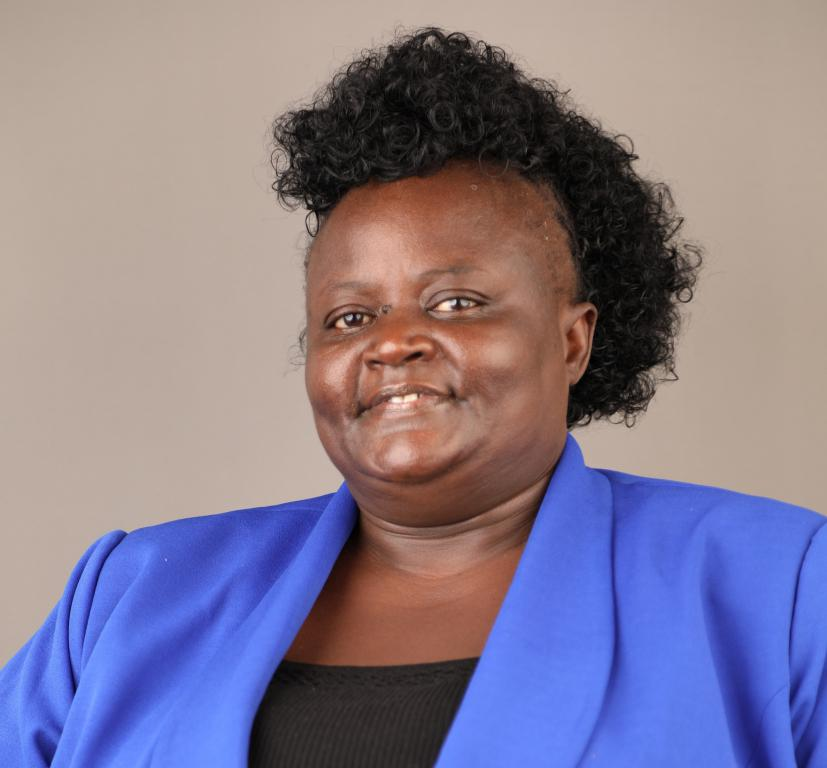

Member of the National Assembly
- Incumbent
- Assumed office 2022
- Constituency: Homa Bay Town

Personal details
- Party: Orange Democratic Movement
- Education: University of Nairobi (PhD)

Joyce Atieno Osogo Bensuda is a Kenyan politician from the Orange Democratic Movement. She was elected to the National Assembly for Homa Bay Town in the 2022 general election.

== Education ==
Osogo earned a Bachelor of Arts in education at the University of Nairobi, where she went on to get her Master of Arts and her PhD in project planning and management.

== Personal life ==
Osogo is an avid singer.

== See also ==
- 13th Parliament of Kenya
