= Suba North Constituency =

Kenyan electoral constituency

Suba North
- constituency for the Parliament of Kenya
- Suba North Constituency within Homa Bay County

- Homa Bay County within Kenya
- County: Homa Bay
- Population: 124,938
- Area: 406 km^{2} (156.8 sq mi)

Current constituency
- Number of members: 1
- Party: ODM
- Member of Parliament: Millie Odhiambo
- Wards: 5

Suba North, formerly known as Mbita Constituency from 1966 to 2013, is an electoral constituency in Kenya. It is one of eight constituencies in Homa Bay County. It was created in 1966 after Lambwe Constituency was divided to Mbita and Ndhiwa constituencies.

It has five electoral wards namely; Mfangano Island, Rusinga Island, Kasgunga, Gembe and Lambwe.

The current Member of Parliament is Millie Odhiambo.

== Members of Parliament ==
| Elections | MP | Party | Notes |
|---|---|---|---|
| 1966 | S. F. Mbeo-Onyango | KANU | |
| 1969 | Osingo G Migure | KANU | One-party system |
| 1974 | Alphonce Okuku Ndiege | KANU | One-party system |
| 1979 | Alphonce Okuku Ndiege | KANU | One-party system |
| 1983 | Peter Claver J. Otieno Nyakiamo | KANU | One-party system. |
| 1992 | Valentine Omolo Opere | Ford-Kenya | |
| 1997 | Gerald Otieno Kajwang | NDP | |
| 2002 | Gerald Otieno Kajwang | NARC | |
| 2007 | Gerald Otieno Kajwang | ODM | |
| 2013 | Millie Odhiambo | ODM | Renamed Suba North Constituency onwards |
| 2017 | Millie Odhiambo | ODM | |
| 2022 | Millie Odhiambo | ODM | |

== Wards ==
Suba North Constituency is further divided into four electoral wards namely; Mfangano Island, Rusinga Island, Kasgunga, Gembe and Lambwe.
