= Mwenda =

Mwenda is an African given name and surname. Notable people with the name include:

- Andrew Mwenda (born 1972), Ugandan journalist
- Jean Bosco Mwenda (1930–1990), Congolese guitar player
- Mwenda Njoka, Kenyan investigative journalist
