= Sori, Kenya =

Coordinates: 00°50′35″S 34°09′25″E

Sori (Suri) is a small town in Migori County, in the former Nyanza Province of Kenya. The town lies on the banks of Lake Victoria. As of 2009, its population is 8,964.

Sori town is located between village i.e. Aloma,Raguda,ng'ira and Aringo (Aloma koyoto Ezekiel)

== History ==
Prior to 1968 Sori was in South Nyanza District. In 1968 Nyanza Province was redistricted and Sori ended up in Homa Bay District. About 1985 Homa Bay District was split into a smaller Homa Bay District and a new Migori District, which included Sori. Sori remained in Migori District when Rongo District was abortively created in 2007.

In 2001 the former Government Rest House in Sori was declared a national monument under the Antiquities and Monuments Act.
