= John Osogo =

Kenyan educationist and historian (1927-1979)

- Born: John Nikola Bwire Osogo; 1 January 1927; Bukhani Village, Port Victoria, Busia District, Kenya
- Died: 9 December 1979 (aged 52)
- Occupations: Educationist and historian
- Known for: Iinvestigation of Kenyan society and history of Kenyan people, particularly his own Luhya community

John Osogo (John Nikola Bwire Osogo; 1 January 1927 — 9 December 1979) was a Kenyan educationist and historian.

He represented the Luhya people.

== Biography ==
Was born in 1927 at Bukani in Port Victoria, in the former Busia District in western Kenya.

After completion his primary and secondary schools in record time, he worked as a tutor in a teacher training college before moving to Kenya Institute of Education, later he succeeded to receive scholarships in order to attend universities in Kenya, Uganda, the UK and US.

John Nikola Osogo devoted his life to investigation of Kenyan society and history of Kenyan people, particularly his own Luhya community.

Osogo died in December 1979.

== Bibliography ==
- Looking at East Africa: The Nineteenth Century, 1965
- Life in Kenya in the Olden Days : The Baluyia, (Nairobi : Oxford University Press), 1965
- A history of the Baluyia, 1966
- The bride who wanted a special present, and other tales from western Kenya, 1966
- A Traditional History of Kenya: Teacher's Handbook. (Longmans of Kenya), 1968
- The bride who wanted a special present, and other tales from western Kenya, 1969
- Kenya's peoples in the past : pupils' book for standard three, 1973
- Bi arusi aliyetaka zawadi maalum : na hadithi nyingine kutoka Magharibi ya Kenya, 1976
- East Africa's peoples in the past, 1977

== Recognition ==
In honor of John Osogo were names given to primary and secondary schools in his home village; his name also is borne on an estate road in Nairobi.

In 2018 the JNB Osogo Foundation was established.
