= Joshua Orwa Ojode =

Kenyan politician

Office of the president, Kenya
- In office 1994 – 10 June 2012
- President: Mwai Kibaki
- Preceded by: Hon. Peter Gatirau Munya

Personal details
- Born: 29 December 1958 Ndhiwa Constituency
- Died: 10 June 2012 (aged 53) Kibiku area, Ngong in Nairobi
- Party: Orange Democratic Movement
- Spouse: Mary Ojode
- Children: Andy Ojode
- Education: Maranda High School; Ramapo College
- Occupation: Politician
- Cabinet: Assistant Minister of Provincial administration and Internal Security

Joshua Orwa Ojode (29 December 1958 – 10 June 2012) was a Kenyan politician. He was first appointed to parliament on June 28, 1994 to represent the Ndhiwa Constituency for the National Development party. In 2007 he joined the Orange Democratic Movement. He served as assistant minister for provincial administration and internal security.

== Early life ==
Ojode attended Ratanga primary school between 1966-1972 and Maranda School from 1973 to 1976. He acquired a Bachelor of Arts degree in Environmental Studies and International Studies from Ramapo College of New Jersey (1988-1991) after successfully serving as an assistant water bailiff at the ministry of water between 1978-1981. Ojode worked at Nile Investments Central Africa Limited (1983-1986) and PolyPipes Limited (1986-1987) as marketing manager. He occasionally taught at Aquinas High School.

== Political career ==
He entered politics in 1994 as a member of parliament for the Ndhiwa Constituency. He was re-elected during the 1997 elections and appointed as Assistant Minister for education, science & technology in the year 2000. In 2001, while he serving as assistant minister of education, science & technology, he tabled an alternative bill to what the government of Kenya had presented. The 2001 Petroleum Amendment bill that he drafted, proposed a regulatory authority but with some differences.

== Death ==
Ojode died on 10 June 2012 in a police helicopter crash in Kenya. At the time of his death, Orwa Ojode was a Member of Parliament and a business person. He was a defender of the government of Kenya and had a strict stand on matters concerning security. On his watch Operation linda nchi (guard the nation) was launched against Al-Shabab in Somalia. On May 11, 2009, Orwa Ojode had survived a chopper crash with the then Police Commissioner Hussein Ali, RiftValley PC Hassan Noor and several journalists. When Kenya's coalition government was formed in 2008, Ojode was among those who were tipped for ministerial positions. His career derailed when Prime Minister Raila Odinga's Orange Democratic Movement party failed to name him a full minister as had been promised.
