= Suba South Constituency =

Kenyan electoral constituency

Suba South
- constituency for the Parliament of Kenya
- Suba South Constituency within Homa Bay County

- Homa Bay County within Kenya
- County: Homa Bay
- Population: 122,383
- Area: 634 km^{2} (244.8 sq mi)

Current constituency
- Number of members: 1
- Party: ODM
- Member of Parliament: Caroli Omondi
- Wards: 4

Suba South, formerly Gwasi is an electoral constituency in Kenya. It is one of eight constituencies in Homa Bay County. The current member of Parliament is Caroli Omondi. He was elected on an ODM ticket.

== Members of Parliament ==
| Elections | MP | Party | Notes |
|---|---|---|---|
| 1997 | Felix Useru Kanyauchi | NDP | |
| 2002 | Zaddock Madiri Syongoh | NARC | |
| 2007 | Mbadi John Ng'ongo | ODM | |
| 2022 | Caroli Omondi | ODM | |

== Wards ==
The Constinuency is sub divided into four wards namely;

- Kaksingri West
- Gwassi North
- Gwassi South
- Ruma Kaksingri East
