= Wambui Otieno =

Kenyan politician (1936–2011)

Wambūi Otieno
- Born: 'Virginia Edith Wambūi Waiyaki; 1936
- Died: 30 August 2011 (aged 74–75)
- Other names: Virginia Edith Wambūi Otieno; Wambūi Waiyaki Otieno Mbūgua
- Occupation: Politician
- Known for: Activism

Virginia Edith Wambūi Otieno (1936–2011), born Virginia Edith Wambūi Waiyaki, who became Wambūi Waiyaki Otieno Mbūgua after her second marriage, and generally known as Wambūi was born into a prominent Kikuyu family and became a Kenyan activist, politician and writer. Wambūi became prominent in 1987 because of a controversial legal fight between her and the clan of her Luo husband Silvano Melea Otieno over the right to bury Otieno. The case involved the tension between customary law and common law in modern-day Kenya in the case of an inter-tribal union. The various legal hearings this case stretched over more than five months and the final verdict suggested that a Kenyan African was presumed to adhere to the customs of the tribe they were born into unless they clearly and unequivocally broke all contact with it. As Otieno retained some rather tenuous links with his clan, they were awarded the right to bury him, ignoring Wambui's wishes. However, Wambūi inherited most of her late husband's estate.

Wambūi Otieno died on 30 August 2011 of heart failure.

== Ancestry and early life ==
Much of the commentary about Wambūi's ancestors and early life comes directly or indirectly from her autobiography, Mau Mau's Daughter: A Life History. However, its account of her ancestor, Waiyaki wa Hinga, has been criticized for attempting to make him a proto-Nationalist and inflating his importance, and her role as a scout and urban guerrilla may have been overstated.

Wambūi was the great-granddaughter of Waiyaki wa Hinga, a Kikuyu leader who was arrested in 1892 by officials of the Imperial British East Africa Company and who died in suspicious circumstances soon after the arrest. Wambūi claimed in her autobiography that he was murdered by being buried alive for opposing the violent seizure of Kikuyu land. However, Waiyaki wa Hinga had initially cooperated with Frederick Lugard of that company in 1890, and his quarrel with Lugard's successor was over the latter's seizure of some of Waiyaki's cattle without payment rather than Waiyaki's opposition to colonial land expropriation.

In Kikuyu oral tradition and folklore, Waiyaki wa Hinga, is represented as a major chief and fighter against the British invaders, but he had an ambiguous record of working with the Imperial British East Africa Company. His death was probably caused by injuries sustained during, and possibly after, his arrest and he was buried on his way to detention, whether already dead or assumed to be dying is unclear. Wambūi disputed the charge that Waiyaki collaborated with the British colonists, by preferring Kikuyu oral traditions to historians' versions that she labelled as Eurocentric, even where the historians are Kenyan, and claimed the family of Waiyaki wa Hinga were the natural leaders of Kenya because of his actions.

Wambūi's grandfather, Mūnyua Waiyaki, donated some land he owned to the local Church of Scotland mission, as a result of which his son, Waiyaki Wantoni, often known as "Tiras" was educated at a Church of Scotland school and, in the 1940s, became Kenya's first African police inspector and later a chief inspector, which Wambūi claimed was compensation for the death of Waiyaki wa Hinga. Tiras Waiyaki became involved in nationalist politics in the 1950s and during the Kenyan Emergency, he was detained in 1954. Wambūi claimed that this impoverished his family and interrupted his children's education, but his detention was only for four months followed by his reinstatement, after which he cooperated with the Kenyan colonial administration. Although Wambūi states he also covertly assisted Mau Mau, this was in minor ways which were outweighed by his pro-colonial actions.

Wambūi was born in Kiambu District in southern Kikuyuland on 21 June 1936 to a well-off family of landowners. Her father, Tiras Waiyaki Wantoni, was a police inspector and she mentioned three elder brothers who had been educated in Britain. One of her brothers was Kenya's former foreign Minister, Dr Munyua Waiyaki. She received a missionary education, including being a boarder at Mambere Girls School, a secondary school with the highest level of education then available for African girls.

== Mau Mau activities ==
In 1952, when at secondary school, Wambūi swore an oath of allegiance to Mau Mau and in 1954 she left home to join the Mau Mau insurgency in Nairobi after the brief detention of her father. Wambūi spied on the British and mobilized women and domestic staff to obtain arms. She was also involved in the campaign to eradicate the "colour bar" in Nairobi, which designated separate areas in public spaces for Europeans, Asians and Africans. She was briefly arrested several times for these activities and issued with orders excluding her from Nairobi, which she flouted. Although her activities in Nairobi can be linked to records of her arrests there, Wambūi's claims of a more active role in Mau Mau battles are not supported by official records.

In the period up to 1960, Wambūi had three children with her fiancé, who she was unable to marry because of family opposition. After Mau Mau forces had been effectively defeated, she became involved in trade union activities and worked closely with Tom Mboya and other trade unionists. She states that her eventual arrest in July 1960 for mobilizing women for strikes and riots, and her subsequent detention, resulted from a betrayal by her fiancé. She was detained in a camp in Lamu until January 1961, and records that she was raped and impregnated by a British prison officer while detained there.

== Political career ==
After her release from detention, Wambūi joined Tom Mboya's Nairobi People's Convention Party as leader of its Women's wing. This party later became part of the Kenya African National Union (KANU), and in 1963 Wambūi was elected head of the women's wing of KANU and was also involved in Kìama Kia Mūìngì, an organization that was a successor to Mau Mau. She was one of the first women to run for political office in postcolonial Kenya as a KANU candidate in 1969 and stood again in 1974, although she was unsuccessful both times, and she served as an official in a number of Kenyan and international Women's organizations'.

In 1985, Wambūi left KANU because of the party's manipulation of elections and lack of internal democracy and, in the last 30 years of her life, was involved with almost every Kenyan opposition party. In 1991, she joined the Forum for Restoration of Democracy which aimed to promote multiparty politics in Kenya. This party experienced a split in 1997 and Wambūi joined the National Development Party of Kenya, unsuccessfully standing for election in the same year. In 2007, she established a new political party the Kenya's People's Conventional Party and unsuccessfully contested a parliamentary seat as its candidate. Wambūi never realized her ambition to be elected to Kenya's parliament.

== Otieno burial case ==
=== Background ===
Soon after her release from detention, Wambūi met Silviano Melea Otieno, a prominent lawyer of Luo heritage based in Nairobi, and the couple married in 1963. Otieno accepted the four of Wambūi's children born before their marriage as his own, the couple had five children and also fostered the six orphaned children of a deceased friend of Otieno. All 15 children were well educated; their daughter, Gladwell Otieno, attended universities in the United States and Germany and one of her brothers and a foster brother attended United States universities. Gladwell Otieno worked for Transparency International in Berlin and was Executive Director of Transparency International Kenya and is founder and Executive Director of "AFRICOG", the African Centre of open Governance.

Wambūi's husband, Silviano Melea Otieno, died suddenly of a heart attack on 20 December 1986. He was a member of the Umira Kager clan of the Luo people, in contrast to Wambūi who was a Kikuyu. Otieno left no will or written wishes about his burial. According to Wambūi, this was because he felt his brother and clan would contest a will and possibly overturn it, whereas an intestacy might offer better protection for her and their children.

Soon after Otieno's death, Wambūi announced that he would be buried on 3 January 1987 at a small farm the couple owned on the outskirts of Nairobi, according to what she said was his wish. This was challenged by his brother, Joash Ochieng Ougo, who was his closest adult-male blood relation (as Otieno's sons were juveniles), and Omolo Siranga, the Nairobi representative of the Umira Kager clan.

=== Legal issues ===
The determinative legal issue was deciding on the relevant Kenyan law on burial, whether statute, Common law or Customary law, and who was the next of kin responsible for the funeral rites. Under Kenyan law at that time, a deceased person's will or the wishes of their spouse were not sufficient to determine a dispute between opposed parties, and several people gave uncorroborated versions of the verbal wishes Otieno was said to have given at various times about his funeral wishes that conflicted with Wambūi's version.

The parties differed in terms of class, gender, ethnicity and their relationship to Otieno. Wambūi and Otieno exemplified an emerging Kenyan bourgeoisie, whereas his brother was a railway foreman The Otieno's had not married under customary law and were Christian. At home, they spoke English and Swahili, not Luo. All their children were Western educated and their friends were Nairobi professionals. Like other elite Kenyans, Otieno's loyalty was to his nuclear family, and he generally disregarded possible obligations to his extended family and clan, although he remained a member of the clan association. He had little contact with his extended family and did not own a house or land in his home district, which he rarely visited except for family funerals. Wambūi had even less contact with his family or clan as, even before Otieno's death, his lineage refused to recognize their marriage as valid under Luo custom, considering it an affront to his family and clan.

Wambūi and the Umira Kager clan disputed the place and manner of Otieno's funeral. Wambūi claimed his lifestyle made Luo custom inappropriate, and that she was Otieno's next of kin under common law, entitled to deal with his burial as she saw fit. She argued that, as she and Otieno were Christians, a Christian burial was appropriate. She did not believe in Luo ancestral spirits nor accept the custom of burial at Otieno's birthplace, and regarded the marginal role given to Luo widows as demeaning.

Otieno's brother and clan's argument was that, despite his lifestyle, Otieno had not severed his relations with his clan, but respected and adhered to Luo custom and traditions, so Luo customary law was relevant to him. Under these customs, his brother was the adult blood relation charged with organising his burial, which takes the form a rite of passage for the dead person's spirit to join Luo ancestral spirits and which marginalizes widows. They also argued that Wambūi was not his blood relation and that, not only were his sons were underage, but their Western education and mixed parentage meant that they had not been born and bred in the Luo traditions, so that none of them could contest the brother's right to bury Otieno.

=== Court hearings ===
The hearings in this in the Kenyan Courts in Nairobi began on 30 December 1986 and ended on 15 May 1987. The initial High Court action was Wambūi's successful request for a declaration that she was entitled to bury Otieno, and an injunction against clan members' attempts to prevent this. The two defendants appeal against this ruling was allowed by the Court of Appeal, which ordering a full hearing of the issues before another High Court judge.

The High Court's judgement was that there was no specific Kenyan statute or common law on burial, and the Kenyan courts were obliged to consider customary law if at least one party to a case was subject to or affected by it. If Otieno was subject to Luo customary law, he should be buried according to Luo customs as outlined by the clan. There was evidence that he belonged to a clan association whose aims were to repatriate the bodies of clan members to their home district and organize their funerals there. The evidence that he had attended traditional funerals and participated in their rites and inherited land according to customary law also contradicted the assertion that he had severed all connection with his clan and tribe. However, the judgement noted that the case was not about the administration of Otieno's estate, which was governed by a statute on succession, not customary law. Wambūi inherited mist of her late husband's estate, either because she owned its assets jointly with her late husband or under the law on succession.

The case then returned to the Court of Appeal which gave its decision on 15 May 1987. Very little new arose, although Wambūi's lawyers argued that she would have the right to bury her husband under the English common law which applied from the time Kenya became a colony. The court found that there was no such common law and that, had she been appointed administrator of her husband's estate, she would have had the statutory right to bury him. As she had not been so appointed as there was no will, customary law would apply and he would be buried by his brother the late Joash Ochieng Ougo at his family home.

=== Controversies ===
Wambūi alleged that the real issue behind the court battle was Otieno's considerable estate, which his brother hoped to claim as his next of kin in Luo terms, and she argued that his clan had a history of seeking money relating to deceased members. However, Wambūi and Otieno had defeated such a claim by registering as many assets as possible in their joint names. She also claimed in court that the Umira Kager clan wished her to enter into a levirate marriage with either Otieno's brother Joash Ochieng Ougo or some other clan member, as the clan would not allow Wambūi to "walk away to her Kikuyu people with Otieno's property". However, she could not show that any compulsion had been involved.

In the 1980s, most Luo considered land as a permanent asset of the lineage, and burying its members on this land symbolizes the right of the lineage to retain it. They also considered that extended family members should share the wealth of richer members and, by combining these two concepts, the idea emerged among members of Umira Kager clan that burying Otieno on clan land entitled his patrilineage to share in his estate.

Wambūi claimed that the Kenyan President, Daniel arap Moi supported the Luo and provided legal representation and funding to fight the case, as Wambūi was both a member of the formerly dominant Kikuyu group and a leader of the movement opposing Moi's autocratic regime. She also questioned the neutrality of the Appeal Court judges However, van Doren, a professor of Law, reports that Wambūi counsel could not point to actual prejudice by these judges and considers that they and the High Court judge dealt as best they could with a situation where the relevant statute requires judges to have regard to African customary law.

In the 30 years since the Otieno burial case, the Kenyan jurisprudence on burials has evolved to some degree. In 1996, the courts ruled that the circumstances of the deceased person's life had to be considered as well as customary laws, in 2004 held the wishes of the wife of the deceased and, in 2010 the wishes of the deceased, while not binding, should be taken into account.

== Later life ==
Her 2003 marriage to Peter Mbūgua was the subject of a national controversy. Many of their relatives condemned the marriage. There have been allegations that the death of Mbūgua's mother, which happened only days after the marriage, was caused by the shock she got upon learning of the marriage.

As of 2008, they were living together with her stonemason husband in Karen, Nairobi. In February 2011 they held a second wedding ceremony, now at St. Andrew's Church in Nairobi, while the first wedding had been a civil ceremony.

Wambūi had suffered heart failure previously and was relying on a pacemaker, an electronic gadget implanted to function as the heart does. Wambūi Otieno died on August 30, 2011, in a Nairobi hospital.

Before her death, Wambūi distributed most of her assets including properties to her children and grandchildren and appointed her two daughters, Gladwell Otieno and Rosalyn Otieno, as her personal representatives in her will to administer what was left. In an echo of the events of 1987, Peter Mbūgua commenced legal proceedings in 2013 on the basis that Wambūi lacked the mental capacity to make a valid will.

== Sources ==
- S. Adenaken (2011). Wambui Otieno Mbugua obituary, The Guardian, 18 October 2011.
- D. M. Anderson (2002), Review of Mau Mau's Daughter by Wambui Waiyaki Otieno and Cora Ann Presley. The Journal of African History, Vol. 43, No. 2.
- E. Cloete (2006). A Time of Living Dangerously: Flanking Histories to Wambui Waiyaki Otieno's Account of Mau Mau, English in Africa, Vol. 33, No. 1.
- D. S. Cohen and E. S. Odhiambo (1992). "Burying SM: The Politics of Knowledge and Sociology of Power in Africa", Portsmouth NH: Heinemann.
- E. Cotran (1987). "Casebook on Kenyan Customary Law", Nairobi: Nairobi University Press.
- J. W. van Doren (1988). "Death African Style: The Case of S. M. Otieno". The American Journal of Comparative Law, Vol. 36, No. 2.
- Global Initiative (2018). "Gladwell Otieno profile",
- A. Gordon (1995). "Gender, Ethnicity, and Class in Kenya: "Burying Otieno" Revisited", Signs, Vol. 20, No. 4.
- J. Kadida (2013), "Wambui Otieno's widower says she was mad when she wrote will", Kenya Star, 11 May 2013.
- Kenya Law (1987), "Virginia Edith Wambui Otieno versus Joash Ochieng Ougo and Omolo Siranga Civil Case 4873 of 1987".
- P. Mukaindo (2011). "Revisiting the S M Otieno Case", Kenyan Law Report Weekly e-Newsletter. .
- C. A. Presley (2011). Wambui Waiyaki Otieno Mbugua: Gender Politics in Kenya from Mau Mau Rebellion to Pro-Democracy Movement in D. D. Cordell (ed.), The Human Tradition in Modern Africa, Lanham: Rowman & Littlefield. ISBN 978-0-74253- 733-0.
- A. B. C. Ocholla-Ayayo (1989). "Death and Burial – an Anthropological Perspective" in J. B. Ojwang and J. N. K. Mugambi (eds), The SM Otieno Case: Death and Burial in Modern in Kenya, Nairobi: Nairobi University Press.
- E. S. Atieno Odhiambo (2003). Matunda ya Uhuru, Fruits of Independence in E. S. Atieno Odhiambo and J. Lonsdale (eds), Mau Mau & Nationhood: Arms, Authority & Narration. Athens: Ohio State University Press. ISBN 0-82141-484-4.
- M. D. Oketch-Owiti (1989). "Some Socio-Legal Issues" in J. B. Ojwang and J. N. K. Mugambi (eds), "The SM Otieno Case: Death and Burial in Modern in Kenya" Nairobi: Nairobi University Press.
- D. Okoth-Okombo (1989). "Semantic Issues" in J. B. Ojwang and J. N. K. Mugambi (eds), "The SM Otieno Case: Death and Burial in Modern in Kenya" Nairobi, Nairobi University Press.
- W. Otieno, ed. C. A. Presley (1998). "Mau Mau's Daughter: A Life History", Boulder: Lynne Rienner. ISBN 978-1-58826-150-2.
- C. Pugliese (2003). Complementary or Contending Nationhoods? in E. S. Atieno Odhiambo & J. Lonsdale (eds), Mau Mau & Nationhood: Arms, Authority & Narration. Athens: Ohio State University Press. ISBN 0-82141-484-4.
- P. Stamp (1991). "Burying Otieno: The Politics of Gender and Ethnicity in Kenya", Signs: Journal of Women in Culture and Society, Vol. 16, No. 4, pp. 808–845.
- N. Wamai (2011). "Tribute to Wambui, a maverick freedom heroine", Daily Nation, 3 September 2011.
- S. C. Wanjala (1989). "Conflicts of Law and Burial" in J. B. Ojwang and J. N. K. Mugambi (eds), "The SM Otieno Case: Death and Burial in Modern in Kenya", Nairobi: Nairobi University Press.
