= Ndhiwa =

- Location within Kenya
- Coordinates: 0.73°S 34.37°E
- Country: Kenya
- Province: Nyanza Province
- Time zone: UTC+3 (EAT)

Ndhiwa is a small town in Kenya's Nyanza Province.
