= Otieno Kajwang =

Kenyan politician (1955–2014)

Gerald Otieno Kajwang
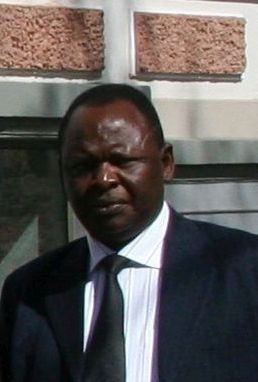

Member of the Kenyan Senate
- In office March 2013 – 19 November 2014
- Constituency: Homa Bay County

Minister of State for Immigration and Registration of Persons
- In office 2008–2013
- President: Mwai Kibaki

Member of the National Assembly
- In office 1998–2013
- Constituency: Mbita

Personal details
- Born: 15 July 1955 Nyeri, Kenya
- Died: 19 November 2014 (aged 59) Kenya
- Party: ODM
- Spouses: Rose Otieno; Faith Otieno
- Relations: Brother to MP TJ Kajwang, Moses Kajwang
- Education: Makerere University (LLB); Kenya School of Law Mbita High School Maseno School
- Profession: Lawyer
- Website: www.otienokajwang.co.ke

Gerald Otieno Kajwang (July 15, 1955 – November 19, 2014) was a Kenyan politician who served as the member of Parliament for Mbita Constituency in the National Assembly of Kenya between 1998 and 2013 and the first Senator of Homa Bay County. He was a member of the Orange Democratic Movement (ODM) party.

== Early life and education ==
Otieno Kajwang was born on 2 July 1956 in Waondo village in Mbita in Homa Bay county. He attended Waondo Primary School, Mbita High School and Maseno School. He pursued a law degree at the University of Nairobi and Makerere University.

== Career ==
Kajwang was elected to Parliament in the 1997 General Elections to represent Mbita Constituency (now Suba North Constituency). He was re-elected in the 2002 and 2007 elections.

In his four terms in Parliament, he served in various committees including the Departmental Committee on the Administration of Justice and Legal Affairs where he served as the chairperson in his first term in Parliament. He was also a member of the Liaison and Standing Orders committees in his first term as MP. He was a member of the Public Investments Committee in his second term, in addition to staying on as a member of the Standing Orders committee.

In his third term in Parliament, Kajwang's ODM entered into a coalition government agreement with the PNU party of President Mwai Kibaki following the hotly contested 2007 General Elections which resulted in a post-election crisis that saw over 1,000 Kenyans lose their lives. As a result, in 2008, Kajwang was appointed Minister of State for Immigration and Registration of Persons in a cabinet comprising 40 ministers and over 50 assistant ministers.

In his time at the Ministry, Kajwang faced accusations of irregular issuance of work and entry permits. He was later cleared of any wrongdoing by a committee of Parliament.

Kajwang served in this role until 2013 when he contested for the newly-created Homa Bay senatorial seat and won, becoming Homa Bay county's first Senator and getting his fourth and final term in Kenya's Parliament.

== Death ==
Kajwang died on the night of 18 November 2014 after suffering cardiac arrest at his Nairobi home before being rushed to Mater Hospital where he passed. He was buried on 28 November 2014 at his home in Waondo village on the shores of Lake Victoria. His national burial committee was chaired by then Siaya Senator James Orengo.

== Family ==
Kajwang was married to two women: Dr Rose Bujehela Otieno, his first wife, and Faith Vivian Otieno, his second wife. He had two children, David Brian Ajwang and Olivia Dorcas Akumu, with Rose and two other children, Ronnie Odinga Otieno and Christy Rhoda Otieno, with Faith.

His brother, TJ Kajwang is the member of Parliament representing Ruaraka constituency in Nairobi county in the Kenya National Assembly.

Upon his death in 2014, his younger brother Moses Kajwang contested the Homa Bay senatorial seat on an ODM ticket in the subsequent by-election and won, beating Maendeleo Democratic Party's Philip Okundi.
