= Ndhiwa Constituency =

Electoral constituency in Kenya

Ndhiwa
- constituency for the Parliament of Kenya
- Ndhiwa Constituency within Homa Bay County

- Homa Bay County within Kenya
- County: Homa Bay
- Population: 218,136
- Area: 713 km^{2} (275.3 sq mi)

Current constituency
- Number of members: 1
- Party: ODM
- Member of Parliament: Martin Peters Owino
- Wards: 7

Ndhiwa Constituency is an electoral constituency in Kenya. It is one of eight constituencies in Homa Bay County. The constituency has seven wards, all electing councillors to the Homa Bay County Council.

== Members of Parliament ==
Elections	MP	Party	Notes
1966	Joseph Odero Jowi	KANU	
1969	Matthew Otieno Ogingo	KANU	One-party system
1974	Joseph Odero Jowi	KANU	One-party system
1979	Zablon Owigo Olang’	KANU	One-party system
1983	Ochola Ogaye Mak’Anyengo	KANU	One-party system.
1988	Ochola Ogaye Mak’Anyengo	KANU	One-party system.
1990	Matthew Otieno Ogingo	KANU	By-election. One-party system.
1992	Tom Elvis Okello Obondo	Ford-Kenya	
1994	Joshua Orwa Ojode	Ford-Kenya	By-election
1997	Joshua Orwa Ojode	NDP	
2002	Joshua Orwa Ojode	NARC	
2007	Joshua Orwa Ojode	ODM	Died in June 2012 helicopter crash
2012	Agustino Neto	ODM	Elected in by-election
2013	Agustino Neto	ODM	
2017	Martin Owino	ODM	
2022	Martin Owino	ODM	

== Wards ==
Wards
Ward	Registered Voters2022
Central Kabuoch	5,515
Central Kanyamwa	3,882
East Kwabwai	4,899
Kanyadoto	5,037
Kanyamwa Kologi	7,419
Kanyikela	2,200
Riana West	4,899
South Kabuoch	7,915
West Kanyamwa	5,073
West Kwabwai	4,347
Total	51,186
*September 2005.
