= Homa Bay =

- Municipality
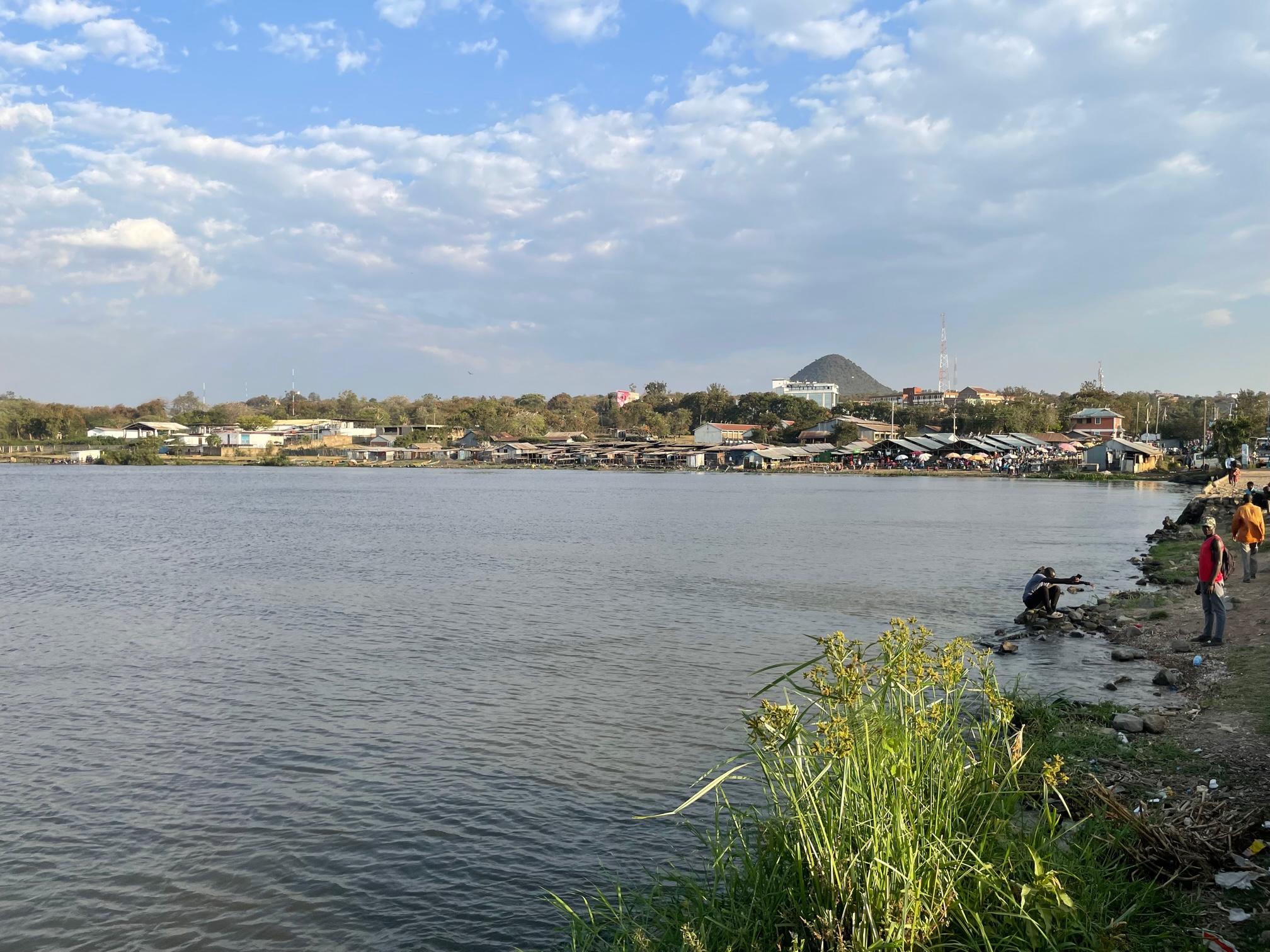
- Homa Bay Skyline captured from a pier in Lake Victoria, 2023

- Location in Kenya
- Coordinates: 0°31′S 34°27′E
- Country: Kenya
- County: Homa Bay County

Population (2019)
  - Total: 44,949
- Time zone: UTC+3 (EAT)
- Climate: Aw

Homa Bay is a town (and eponymous bay) on the south shore of Winam Gulf of Lake Victoria, in western Kenya. It lies near Mount Homa (in the Luo language Got Marahuma or God Uma ["famous mountain"]) and Ruma National Park, the latter noted for Jackson's hartebeests and roan antelope (the government has also released reticulated giraffes into the park).

Homa Bay was once the District Headquarters for all of South Nyanza District, Nyanza Province, but has now been divided into at least three districts. Homa Bay is now the capital of Homa Bay County per the new constitution. The town of Homa Bay hosts a Municipal Council. The municipality had a population of 44,949 in 2019.

Homa Bay municipality has six wards: Central, Kalanya, Kanyabala, Kanyadier/Kothidha, Katuma, and Posta/Bonde. All of them belong to the Rangwe Constituency, which has a total of fourteen wards. The remaining eight are located within Homa Bay County Council, the rural council of Homa Bay District.

== See also ==
- Kanjera South (paleontological site)
