= Homa Bay County =

Coordinates: 0.683333°S 34.45°E

- County
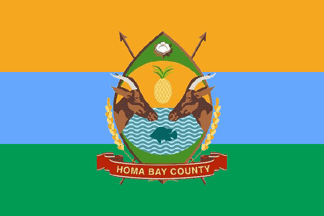
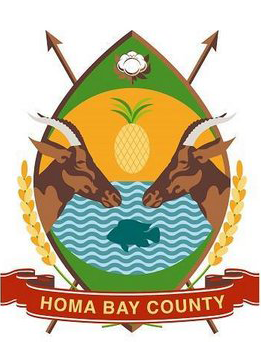
- Flag Coat of arms

- Location in Kenya
- Country: Kenya
- Founded: 4 March 2013
- Capital: Homa Bay

Government
  - Governor: Gladys Wanga

Area
  - Total: 3,154.7 km^{2} (1,218.0 sq mi)

Population (2019)
  - Total: 1,131,950
  - Rank: 16th
  - Density: 354/km^{2} (920/sq mi)
- Time zone: UTC+3 (EAT)
- GDP (PPP): ▲$3.775B (23rd)
- Per Capita (PPP): ▲$3,125 (33rd)
- GDP (nominal): ▲$1.386B (23rd)
- Per Capita (nominal): ▲$1,148 (33rd)
- Website: homabay.go.ke

Homa Bay County is a county in the former Nyanza Province of Kenya. Its capital and largest town is Homa Bay. The county has a population of 1,131,950 (2019 census) and an area of 3,154.7 km^{2}. Lake Victoria is a major source of livelihood for Homa Bay County. It has 40 wards, each represented by an MCA in the Homa Bay county assembly located in Homa Bay town, which is the county headquarters.

Homa Bay County has eight sub counties just like the constituencies.

== Demographics ==
Homa Bay County has a total population of 1,131,950 persons, of which 539,560 are males, 592,367 females and 23 intersex persons. It has 262,036 households with an average of 4.3 people per household. The county has a population density of 359 people per square kilometre.

Population By Sub-County
Sub-County	Population
Homa Bay	117,439
Ndhiwa	218,136
Rachuonyo North	178,686
Rachuonyo East	121,822
Rachuonyo South	130,814
Rangwe	117,732
Suba North	124,938
Suba South	124,938
Total	1,131,950

=== Religion ===
Religion in Homa Bay County

Religion (2019 Census)	Number	Percentage (%)
Catholicism	183,946	16.34
Protestant	433,102	38.47
Evangelical Churches	241,060	21.41
African instituted Churches	200,900	17.84
Orthodox	6,731	0.60
Other Christian	28,805	2.56
Islam	7,469	0.66
Hindu	138	0.01
Traditionists	3,407	0.30
Other	15,093	1.34
No Religion/Atheism	4,799	0.43
Don't Know	394	0.03
Not Stated	53	0.00

== Administrative and political units ==
=== Administrative Units ===
The county has been subdivided into 8 sub-counties with 40 county assembly wards. There are a total of 19 divisions, with 116 locations and 226 sub-locations.

==== Electoral constituencies ====
The county has eight electoral constituencies:

- Homa Bay Town Constituency
- Kabondo Kasipul Constituency
- Karachuonyo Constituency
- Kasipul Constituency
- Suba North Constituency
- Ndhiwa Constituency
- Rangwe Constituency
- Suba South Constituency

=== Political leadership ===
Gladys Wanga is the current governor after being elected in the 2022 general elections that took place on August 9. Moses Otieno Kajwang’ is the senator and was elected in 2015 in a by - election due to the death of his brother, Gerald Otieno Kajwang. He retained his seat in the 2017 General elections. Gladys Atieno Nyasuna Wanga is the second woman representative to hold the office after being elected in 2017.

==== Members of parliament ====
Constituency	Member of Partliament	Party	Session
Homa Bay Town Constituency	Peter Opondo Kaluma	ODM	12th Parliament (2017 - 2022)
Ndhiwa Constituency	Hon Martin Peters Owino	ODM	13th Parliament (2022 - 2027)
Kasipul Constituency	Hon Boyd Ong'ondo Were	ODM	13th Parliament (2025 - 2027)
Suba North Constituency	Hon Millie Grace Akoth Odhiambo	ODM	13th Parliament (2022 - 2027)
Karachuonyo Constituency	Hon Andrew Adipo Okuome	ODM	13th Parliament (2022 - 2027)
Suba South Constituency	Hon Caroli Omondi	ODM	13th Parliament (2022 - 2027)
Rangwe Constituency	Hon Lilian Achieng Gogo	ODM	13th Parliament (2022 - 2027)
Kabondo Kasipul Constituency	Hon Eve Akinyi Obara	ODM	13th Parliament (2022 - 2027)

== Health ==
There are a total of 206 health facilities across the county of which 144 are public and 62 are private.

Health Facilities by Ownership
Public	Number
Level 5	1
Level 4	11
Level 3	31
Level 2	101
Private	
Hospitals (Mission/NGO)	3
Health centres	36
Dispensaries	23
Total	206

== Education ==
The county has 1451 ECD centres of which are 991 public and 460 private. There are 1089 primary schools, 312 secondary schools, 50 youth polytechnic, two technical training institutions and two university colleges.

Education Institutions
Category	Public	Private	Total
ECD Centres	991	460	1451
Primary schools	868	221	1089
Secondary schools	294	18	312
Youth Polytechnic	50	0	50
Technical Training Institutions	2		2
Universities	1		1

== Transport and communication ==
The county is covered by road network of 3225 km of which 1840 is covered by earth surface, 1240 km is gravel and 184 km is covered by bitumen. There are 13 postal services with 3,300 installed letter boxes, 1,605 rented letter boxes 1,695 vacant letter boxes.

== Trade and commerce ==
The county grows a variety of agricultural crops based on the ecological zones found in the county. Coffee, sugarcane, maize, beans, tobacco, dairy and fish farming in Rachuonyo subcounty. Maize, millet, pineapples, sorghum, sunflower and tomatoes are grown in Gwasi Hills of Suba. Millet, green grams, tobacco, sugarcane, pineapples, sisal are grown in Ndhiwa, Homa Bay town and Rangwe. Cotton was grown in Rachuonyo and central Mbita before the collapse of the cotton industry. There are efforts that are underway to revive cotton farming across the county. Some of the animals kept in the county include dairy cattle, beef cattle, sheep, hair goats, dairy goats, meat pigs, rabbit and poultry.

The county is also a tourist attraction center because of the mysterious lake found in Karachuonyo constituency, Lake Simbi Nyaima, a little volcanic lake well known for its ancient origins and its undiscovered prehistoric sites that make it a Kenya safari tourist destination of the worldwide interest. The lake is known for seasonal migration of Flamingo birds from Lakes Bogoria, Natron and Nakuru National Park among other lakes from the rift valley.

The county is part of the Lake Region Economic Bloc (LREB) established in 2018 to foster regional economic, industrial, social, and technological collaboration.

== Villages and settlements ==
- Andiwo's Village
- Awach Tende
- Mwenda
- Oyugis
- Akelo's Village

== See also ==
- Andiwo's Village
- Kericho County
- Kisii County
- Kisumu County
- Lake Victoria
- Lambwe
- Migori County
- Nyamira County
- Siaya County
- Sindo Township
