= Nyanza Province =

Province of Kenya

Nyanza
- Former Province
- Location in Kenya.
- Coordinates: 0°30′S 34°40′E
- Country: Kenya
- Capital: Kisumu

Area
  - Total: 12,477.1 km^{2} (4,817.4 sq mi)

Population (2009 Census)
  - Total: 5,442,711
  - Density: 436.216/km^{2} (1,129.79/sq mi)
- Time zone: UTC+3 (EAT)

The capital of Kenya's Nyanza Province, on Lake Victoria, is Kisumu (click to enlarge map)

Nyanza Province (Kenyan English: [ˈɲaːnzə]; Swahili: Mkoa wa Nyanza) was one of Kenya's eight administrative provinces before the formation of the 47 counties under the 2010 constitution. Six counties were organised in the area of the former province.

The region is located in the southwestern part of Kenya around Lake Victoria. It includes part of the eastern edge of the lake and is inhabited predominantly by the Luo people and Kisii people. There are also Bantu-speaking tribes, such as the Kuria, and some Luhya, living in the province. The province derives its name from Nyanza, a Bantu word which means a large mass of water.

The provincial capital was Kisumu, the third-largest city in Kenya. The province had a population of 4,392,196 at the 1999 census within an area of 16.162 km^{2}, or 12.613 km^{2} of land.

The climate is tropical humid.

== Counties ==
The following counties make up the area of the former Nyanza province:

Code	County	Former Province	Area (km^{2})	Population Census 2009	Capital
41	Siaya	Nyanza	2,496.1	842,304	Siaya
42	Kisumu	Nyanza	2,009.5	968,909	Kisumu
43	Homa Bay	Nyanza	3,154.7	963,794	Homa Bay
44	Migori	Nyanza	2,586.4	917,170	Migori
45	Kisii	Nyanza	1,317.9	1,152,282	Kisii
46	Nyamira	Nyanza	912.5	598,252	Nyamira
	Totals		12,477.1	5,442,711	

=== Districts after 2007 ===
Several new districts were created in 2007 in Kenya, some of which were in Nyanza Province:

District	Capital
Bondo	Bondo
Borabu	Nyansiongo
Gucha	Ogembo
Homa Bay	Homa Bay
Kisii	Kisii
Kisumu East	Kisumu town
Kisumu West	Hola
Kuria West District	Kehancha
Kuria East District	Kegonga
Manga	
Masaba	Keroka
Migori	Migori
Nyamira	Nyamira
Nyando	Awasi
Rachuonyo	Kosele
Rarieda	Madiany
Rongo	Rongo
Siaya	Siaya
Suba	Sindo

== Languages ==
The predominant language in Nyanza is Dholuo, a Nilotic language is whose origin is South Sudan and Ekegusii (Bantu Language).

Other languages include Luhya, Kuria, Suba and the national languages of English and Swahili. Other languages from the many Kenyan communities are also spoken in small pockets by migrants from these communities.

== Notable residents ==
- Tom Mboya, politician and former minister
- Simeon Nyachae (1932–2021), Kenyan politician and businessman from Kisii County
- Barack Obama Sr. (1934–1982), economist with the government; educated in Hawaii and Massachusetts; father of the President Barack Obama (2009–2017) of the United States
- Jaramogi Oginga Odinga, independence fighter and socialist politician
- Raila Odinga, son of Jaramogi Oginga Odinga, politician and the leader of Opposition in Kenya
- Bethwell Allan Ogot, renowned historian and academician
- Achieng Oneko, independence fighter and socialist politician
- Robert Ouko, politician and former minister
- James Orengo, lawyer, well known human rights activist, and a prominent politician who is the current governor for Siaya County
- Anyang' Nyong'o, governor of Kisumu county
- Lupita Nyong'o, Oscar winning actress and author
- Grace Ogot, accomplished author and former MP Gem
- Prof. Sammy Ongeri, second Kisii County senator and former MP Nyaribari Madaba
- Elijah Marube, environmental consultant and industrialist
- Andrew John Omanga, former minister and Ambassador, second MP Nyaribari Chache
- James Nyamweya, MP Nyaribari Chache and one of the first ministers in first Government
- Samson Mwita Marwa, MP

== Villages and settlements ==
- Amimos 0.18°S 34.8°E
- Bar Olengo
- Baragulu 0.03°N 34.32°E
- Baroseno 0.11°N 34.28°E
- Bonyunyu
- Boguche
- Bonyakoni
- Buholo
- Bukangasi 0.08°N 34.03°E
- Bulungo 0.02°N 34.1°E
- Bulwani
- Bumburia 0.53°S 34.87°E
- Busonga 0.11°N 34.1°E
- Bumudondo 0.07°N 34.03°E
- Dianga 0.93°S 34.53°E
- Homa Lime Kowuor 0.43°S 34.47°E
- Jaleny 0.98°S 34.45°E
- Kabola 0.83°S 34.53°E
- Kadenge 0.02°N 34.19°E
- Kalandini 0.17°S 34.37°E
- Kamuga 0.2°S 34.5°E
- Karadolo 0.25°N 34.13°E
- Kobodo 0.671°S 34.416°E
- Kodiaga 0°N 34.45°E
- Kogoe 0°N 34.33°E
- Lwala 0.5°S 34.37°E
- Lady Whitehouse
- Magunga
- Marinde 0.65°S 34.52°E
- Marucha 0.57°S 34.43°E
- Mehuru 1.02°S 34.12°E
- Migoko 0.37°S 34.32°E
- Mirieri 0.07°S 34.43°E
- Mirogi
- Miyare 0.35°S 34.27°E
- Mohanda Arunde 0.11°N 34.5°E
- Musa Nyandisi 0.72°S 34.83°E
- Mutet
- Muweri 0.1°N 34.2°E
- Mw'aboto
- Ngia
- Ngiri 0.9°S 34.15°E
- Nyabera
- Nyadorera 0.12°N 34.1°E
- Nyamuga 0.73°S 34.55°E
- Nyamware
- Nyangweso 0.08°N 34.46°E
- Nyowita
- Uranga
