= Odinga =

Odinga is a surname. Notable people with the surname include:

- Jaramogi Oginga Odinga (1911–1994), Kenya's first vice-president and later opposition leader.
  - Raila Odinga (1945–2025), Prime Minister of Kenya, son of Jaramogi Oginga Odinga
  - Ida Odinga (born 1950), Kenyan businesswoman, activist and educator, wife of Raila Odinga
  - Oburu Odinga (born 1943), MP, son of Jaramogi Oginga Odinga
- Norman Odinga (born 1963), Canadian association football player
- Sekou Odinga, American activist from the Black Liberation Army

== See also ==
- Jaramogi Oginga Odinga University of Science and Technology in Kenya
