= 2013 Kisumu local elections =

Local elections in Kenya

Local elections were held in Kisumu to elect a Governor and County Assembly on 4 March 2013. Under the new constitution, which was passed in a 2010 referendum, the 2013 general elections were the first in which Governors and members of the County Assemblies for the newly created counties were elected. They will also be the first general elections run by the Independent Electoral and Boundaries Commission(IEBC) which has released the official list of candidates.

== Gubernatorial election ==
Candidate	Running Mate	Coalition	Party	Votes
Osenya, Francis Erick Otieno	Odero, Lameck Ogweno	Jubilee	The National Alliance	--
Rangua, Jackton Nyanungo	Busia, Ruth Adhiambo Odinga	CORD	Orange Democratic Movement	--

== Prospective candidates ==
The following are some candidates who have made public their intentions to run:

- Jack Ranguma - former Kenya Revenue Authority Commissioner
- Ruth Adhiambo Odinga - Sister to Prime Minister Raila Odinga
- Ojwang’ Kombudo - former Nyakach MP
