= Bondo Constituency =

Electoral constituency of Kenya

Bondo
- constituency for the Parliament of Kenya
- Bondo Constituency within Siaya County

- Siaya County within Kenya
- County: Siaya County
- Population: 197,883
- Area: 599 km^{2} (231.3 sq mi)

Current constituency
- Created: 1963
- Number of members: 1
- Party: ODM
- Member of Parliament: Gideon Ochanda Ogolla
- Wards: 6

Bondo Constituency is an electoral constituency in Kenya. It is one of six constituencies in Siaya County. Homa Bay County borders it to the south, Rarieda Constituency to the east. Its major and largest town is Bondo. Usenge, Nyamonye, Nyang'oma and K'Oppolo are other town centres.

== Members of Parliament ==
Elections	MP	Party	Notes
1963	Oginga Odinga	KANU	
1966	Oginga Odinga	KPU	
1969	William Odongo Omamo	KANU	One-party system
1974	John Hezekiah Ougo	KANU	One-party system
1979	John Hezekiah Ougo	KANU	One-party system
1980	William Odongo Omamo	KANU	By-elections. One-party system.
1983	William Odongo Omamo	KANU	One-party system.
1988	Gilbert Paul Oluoch	KANU	One-party system.
1992	Oginga Odinga	Ford-Kenya	Odinga died during his tenure.
1995	Oburu Odinga	NDP	By-elections
1997	Oburu Odinga	NDP	
2002	Oburu Odinga	NARC	
2007	Oburu Odinga	ODM	
2013	Gideon Ochanda	ODM	
2017	Gideon Ochanda	ODM	
2022	Gideon Ochanda	ODM	

== Wards ==
Population of wards in 2005
Ward	Registered Voters	Local Authority
Ajigo	2,160	Bondo town
Bar Kowino East	1,773	Bondo town
Bar Kowino West	1,010	Bondo town
Bondo town	3,640	Bondo town
Maranda West	3,416	Bondo county
North Sakwa	3,258	Bondo county
Nyang'oma	13,420	Bondo county
Nyawita	2,783	Bondo town
Usigu East	6,021	Bondo county
Usigu West	10,521	Bondo county
Total	48,002	
