= African Union High Representative for Infrastructure Development =

African Union post

High Representative of the African Union Commission
- Incumbent; Vacant since February 23, 2023
- Style: The Right Honorable
- Appointer: The Chairperson of the African Union Commission
- Formation: 2018

The African Union High Representative for Infrastructure Development post was created in October 2018 by the African Union Commission Chair Moussa Faki The first High Representative was Raila Odinga, Leader of the Opposition and former Prime Minister of Kenya (2008–2013), who was appointed on 20 October 2018 by the Chairperson of the African Union Commission. Prior to this appointment, the Directorate of Trade and Industry was headed by Elisabeth Tankeu. Odinga was relieved of his duties by the entity on 23 February 2023. The post has been vacated ever since.

== Role ==
The High Representative is tasked with working to support and strengthen the efforts of the commission's relevant departments and those of the Planning and Coordinating Agency of the New Partnership for Africa's Development (NEP political support from Member States and the Regional Economic Communities (RECs) and facilitating greater ownership by all concerned stakeholders on the continent. They will also support the Commission and NEPAD initiatives to encourage increased commitment from development partners.

In the discharge of their mandate and building on the work and leadership of the PIDA Presidential Infrastructure Champion Initiative (PICI), the High Representative will pay particular attention to the missing links along the transnational highway corridors identified as part of the Trans-African Highways Network, with a view to facilitating their development and modernization. They will also focus on the continental high-speed train, which is one of the flagship projects of the First Ten-Year Implementation Plan of Agenda 2063, in the context of the relevant African Union decisions. They will interact with the current champions of related African Union initiatives and seek their guidance, to ensure the required synergy and coherence.

== Appointments ==
The High Representative is appointed by the Chairperson of the African Union Commission.

== List of African Union High Representative for Infrastructure Development ==
#	Picture	Name (Born–Died)	Took office	Left office	Political Party
High Representative
1		Raila Odinga (1945–2025)	20 October 2018	23 February 2023	Orange Democratic Movement
