= Ruth Odinga =

Kenyan politician

County Woman Representative
- Incumbent
- Assumed office 31 August 2022
- Constituency: Kisumu County

Deputy Governor for Kisumu County
- In office 27 March 2013 – 21 August 2017
- Governor: Jack Ranguma
- Preceded by: Position established
- Succeeded by: Mathew Owili

Personal details
- Citizenship: Kenyan
- Party: Orange Democratic Movement
- Relations: Jaramogi Oginga Odinga (father); Raila Odinga (brother); Oburu Odinga (brother)
- Education: University of Oslo
- Occupation: Politician

Ruth Busia Adhiambo Odinga is a Kenyan politician and current County Woman Representative for Kisumu County in the National Assembly. She was the first Deputy Governor for Kisumu County from 2013 to 2017. Odinga is a member of the Orange Democratic Movement (ODM). She is the daughter to Jaramogi Odinga, the first vice president of Kenya, and the sister of both former Prime Minister the late Raila Odinga and Oburu Odinga, the serving Senator for Siaya County.

== Education ==
Ruth Odinga is a politician born into a Kenyan political dynasty,. She attended Xaverian Primary School, Kisumu where she obtained her East African Certificate of Primary Education (EACPE) in 1973. She obtained her East African Advanced Certificate of Education (EAACE) from The Kenya High school in 1981. In 1983 she attended the Mutare Girls High School, Zimbabwe, where she gained her A Levels. She obtained a degree in social science in 1985, and a postgraduate certificate in development studies in 1989, from the University of Oslo.

== Political career ==
Ruth Odinga is a former Deputy Governor of Kisumu County and founding chairperson of the Kenya Network of Women Governors (KENWOG). She is the younger sister of Rt. Hon. Raila Odinga

Odinga entered politics in 2013, running against Jack Ranguma to be Governor of Kisumu County. After losing to Ranguma, she joined his team and served as his Deputy Governor from 2013 to 2017. She was the senior advisor to the Governor and director of Special Programs and Disaster Management from 2017 to 2022.

In October 2017 she faced charges after taking part in protest against the election officials in Kisumu. In 2019, after her presence at a protest disrupting election training in Kisumu, there were again calls for her to be arrested and charged with incitement to violence.

She was elected the Kisumu County Women Representative in August 2022 using the Orange Democratic Movement ticket defeating her competitor Valentine Anyango of the Movement for Democracy and Growth party (MDG).

Odinga is a women’s rights activist and advocate for women's development and women in leadership. She is the founder of the Kenya Network of Women Governors (KEWOG), and continues to act as its chair. She is also the recipient of a Gender Champion Award from the Kenyan Department of Gender.
