= Bondo, Kenya =

Municipality in Siaya County, Kenya

Coordinates: 0°14′N 34°16′E

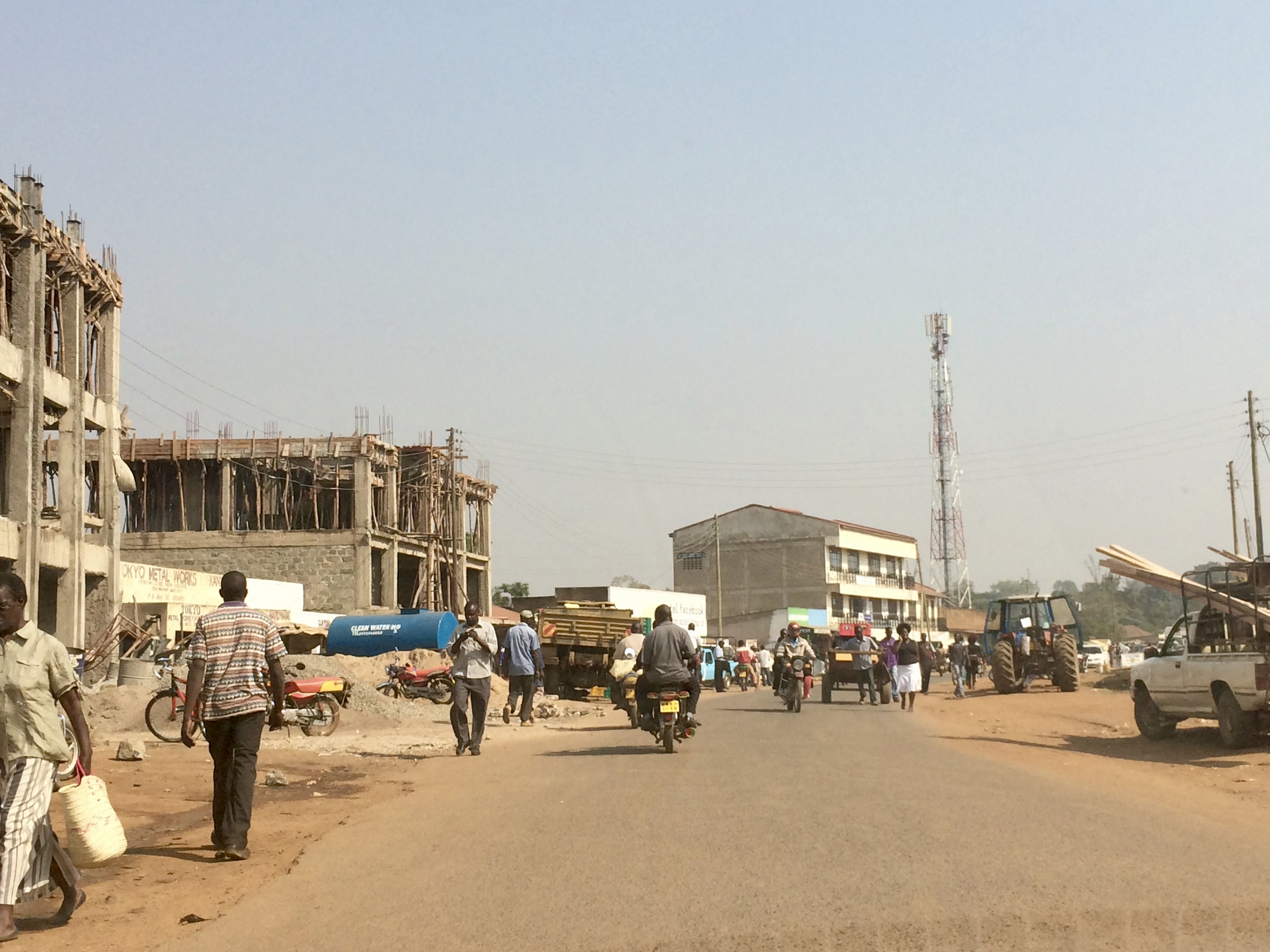
Bondo Municipality, Siaya County, Kenya

Bondo is a municipality in Siaya County of Kenya. It has traditionally been a fishing town and its entire economy rotates around the fish from Lake Victoria. It the largest and most populous town of the county. Located 64 kilometers west of Kisumu, Bondo was established in the early 1920s as a market centre. In the 1990s, it became the headquarters of Bondo district which was carved out of the larger Siaya District.

The municipality has developed and expanded over the years and is currently a busy and vibrant economic and educational hub with not only a university, Jaramogi Oginga Odinga University of Science and Technology, but also other tertiary institutions such as Kenya Medical Training College, Bondo Teachers Training College and Bondo Technical Training Institute. It had a population of 22,712 (2019 census). Some secondary schools in Bondo include Nyamira girls high school, Maranda boys high school, Jaramogi Oginga Odinga secondary school, Barkowino secondary school, Kapiyo secondary school and Bondo township.

Financial institutions which have offices and branches in the town include Cooperative Bank, Kenya Commercial Bank, Equity Holdings, Diamond Trust Bank and Post Bank. They are all located along the town's main road.

Bondo Municipal council has five wards: Ajigo, Bar Kowino East, Bar Kowino West, Bondo Town and Nyawita which is also known as Maranda. All of them are part of Bondo Constituency.
