= Rabuor =

Coordinates: 0°49′S 34°08′E

Rabuor is a village belong to Kobura Ward, Kisumu County, Kenya.

Situated on the Kisumu-Nairobi road (B1 road), this divisional capital is 7.4 kilometres from Kisumu city and approximately 14 kilometers from AheroTown. It has a population of approximately 10,000.
