= Oburu Odinga =

Kenyan politician (born 1943)

Oburu Oginga

Senator for Siaya County
- Incumbent
- Assumed office 8 September 2022
- Preceded by: James Orengo

Member of the East African Legislative Assembly
- In office 2017–2022

Assistant Minister for Finance
- In office 2008–2013
- President: Mwai Kibaki
- Prime Minister: Raila Odinga

Member of Parliament
- In office 1994–2013
- Preceded by: Oginga Odinga
- Succeeded by: Gideon Ochanda
- Constituency: Bondo

Personal details
- Born: Oburu Ng'ong'a Oginga; 15 October 1943 (age 82) Nyanza Province, Kenya Colony
- Party: Orange Democratic Movement (ODM)
- Relations: Jaramogi Oginga Odinga (father); Raila Odinga (brother); Ruth Odinga (sister); Winnie Odinga (niece)
- Occupation: Politician
- Known for: Kenyan politics

Oburu Ng'ong'a Oginga (born 15 October 1943) is a Kenyan politician currently serving as senator for Siaya County since 8th August, 2022 .He previously served as a member of the East African Legislative Assembly from 2017 to 2022. He was the former assistant minister for finance in the 2008 Grand Coalition government and a former Member of the Kenyan Parliament.

He is a member of the Odinga political family, the son of Kenya’s first vice president Jaramogi Oginga Odinga and the brother of the late Raila Odinga and politician Ruth Odinga.

On 11 December 2017, Oburu was elected to represent Kenya at the EALA. In 2021, he published an autobiography, In the Shadow of My Father, compiled by Bethuel Oduo.

Following the death in 2025 of his brother Raila, he was appointed acting leader of the Orange Democratic Movement (ODM), and was later confirmed as the party leader.
