= Winnie Odinga =

Kenyan politician

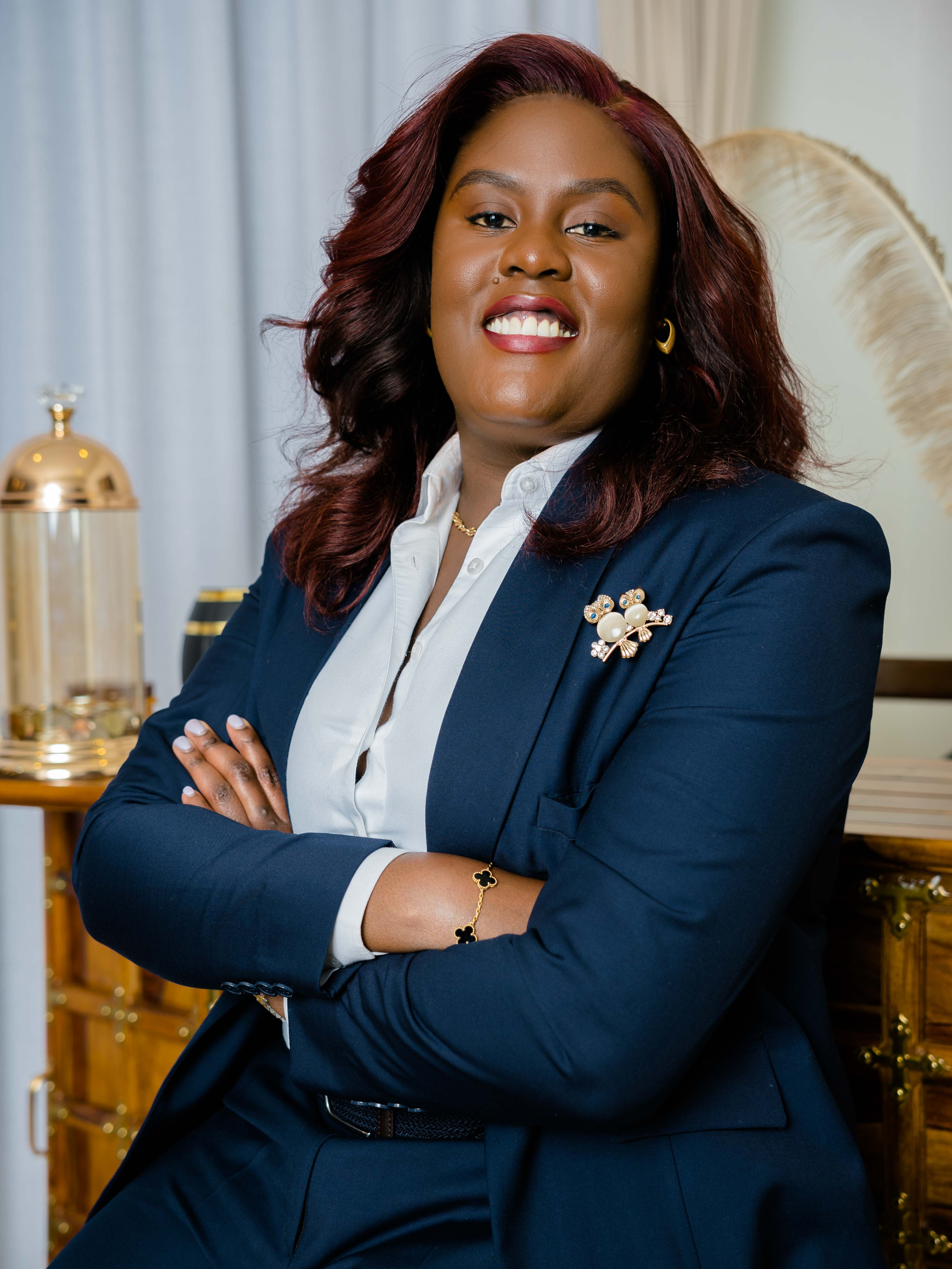
Winnie Odinga

Winnie Chogo Odinga (born 6 March 1990) known as Kazi, is a Kenyan politician serving as an East African Community member of Parliament in the fifth East African Legislative Assembly in Arusha representing the Government of Kenya

Odinga was nominated to the regional Legislative Assembly (EALA) by the Orange Democratic Movement a national political party in Kenya, in November 2022 from where she was elected by both houses of the Kenyan Parliament.

== Early life and education ==
Winnie Odinga is the fourth child and last-born daughter of the late Prime Minister of Kenya Raila Odinga and Ida Odinga. She is also the granddaughter of Kenya's first Vice President, Jaramogi Oginga Odinga who was a prominent politician in both Kenya and Africa's struggle for independence.

She attended Rusinga School for her primary education and Brookhouse International School for her secondary education in Lang'ata, Nairobi County. She obtained a degree in political science from Drexel University in Philadelphia.

== Career ==
Upon returning from college, Odinga worked as her father's private secretary. Her father often sent her to participate in election campaigns around the African continent.

In 2008, Odinga founded The BrickHouse Counsel а consultancy firm based in Nairobi, Kenya. The firm has worked for presidential campaigns.
