= Ida Odinga =

Kenyan businesswoman, activist and educator (born 1930)

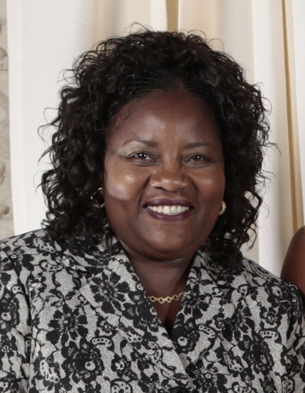
- Odinga in 2009

Spouse of the Prime Minister of Kenya
- In office April 17, 2008 – April 9, 2013
- Preceded by: Ngina Kenyatta (1964)

Personal details
- Born: Ida Anyango Oyoo; 24 August 1950 (age 76) Migori, South Nyanza District, Kenya Colony
- Citizenship: Kenya
- Spouse: Raila Odinga (1973–2025)
- Children: Fidel Odinga; Winnie Odinga; Rosemary Odinga; Raila Odinga Jr
- Education: Bachelor of Arts
- Alma mater: University of Nairobi
- Occupation: Businesswoman

Ida Betty Odinga (born Ida Anyango Oyoo on 24 August 1950) is a Kenyan businesswoman, activist, and educator. She is the widow of Raila Odinga, the former Prime Minister of Kenya and the leader of the National Super Alliance (NASA). In 2010, The Standard named Odinga, as one of the first women to head a major Kenyan company, and one of the most powerful women in Kenya in 2010.

== Early life and education ==
Odinga earned a Bachelor of Arts from the University of Nairobi in 1973 when she was 24 years old. While attending the University of Nairobi, she met her future husband, Raila Odinga, who was an employee of the university's Department of Engineering at the time. The couple married on 1 September 1973 and have four children. One of their children, Fidel Odinga, died in 2015.

== Career ==
She worked as a teacher for more than twenty years after graduation. She taught at The Kenya High School, an all-girls public boarding school in Nairobi. Her students included the late Governor of Bomet County, Joyce Laboso.

Raila Odinga was imprisoned in 1982 as a political prisoner by the government of President Daniel arap Moi. Ida Odinga largely raised her children herself during those years while working as a teacher and living on the KHS campus. However, Ida Odinga was later expelled from her teaching position and from her home on the school campus by the Kenya African National Union-led government due to Raila Odinga's political opposition.

Odinga founded the League of Kenya Women Voters in 1991 , which promotes opportunities for women in the political arena. She served as the chairperson of the League. She has also championed a host of other causes, many focused on women, children, and health in Kenya. Odinga has advocated for the prevention of breast cancer and fistulas and the eradication of the chigoe flea. She has also mentored Kenyan schoolgirls and sat on the board of directors for an organization that aids paraplegics.

She became the managing director of the East African Spectre, a liquefied gas cylinder manufacturing company, in 2003, becoming one of the first women to head a major Kenyan company.

The Standard listed Odinga as one of the most powerful women in Kenya in 2010.

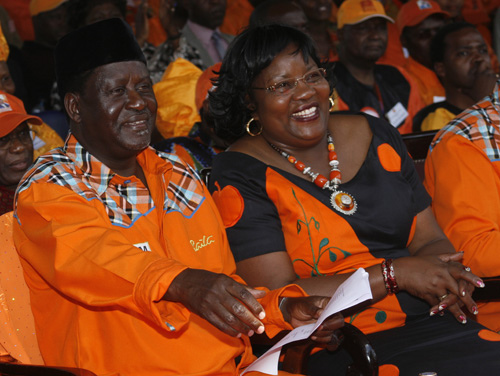
Odinga (right) with husband Raila at the ODM Rally in 2007

In a 2012 interview with CNN International, Odinga elaborated on her life as a politician's wife. She told CNN's Felicia Taylor, "It's good to be a wife, but it's good to be an educated wife. Being a wife, it's just not a position of subordination—it's a position of strength."

In November 2018, Odinga endorsed Bill 2018, which would amend the Constitution of Kenya to guarantee the nomination of female candidates and MPs to Parliament. While she publicly supported the bill, which she said would increase leadership posts for women MPs, Odinga also noted that women had never had the opportunity to compete equally with male politicians in politics. Odinga appeared in Parliament to support sitting women MPs during the debate. However, the bill failed to pass in the National Assembly in February 2019, despite vocal support from Ida Odinga, President Uhuru Kenyatta, and other prominent politicians and activists.

In 2019 Odinga emphasized that she would not endorse anybody for the 2022 general election and people are free to choose anyone they want.

In June 2020, Ida's husband, a former prime minister, traveled to the United Arab Emirates for hospital treatment.

Her husband died on 15 October 2025.

She was appointed by President William Ruto to be the permanent representative for Kenya at the United Nations Environment Programme (UNEP) in 2026, where she works todate.

== Controversy ==
=== Regulation of churches ===
Earlier this year, Ida Odinga called for the regulation of churches to tame the unchecked mushrooming of worship centers across the country. She said the National Council of Churches of Kenya (NCCK) should also ensure church leaders are taken through training for quality service to the congregants. This sparked a heated debate on the internet, forcing her to withdraw and apologize because the remarks made didn't sit well with some members of the clergy. She also stated that her remarks were blown out of context. Ida had, however, received backing from the Atheists Society in Kenya, which demanded that churches not run by theologians should be abolished. She is also an ardent advocate for religious neutrality in the public education system.
