= Rosemary Odinga =

Kenyan entrepreneur and advocate for alternative agriculture

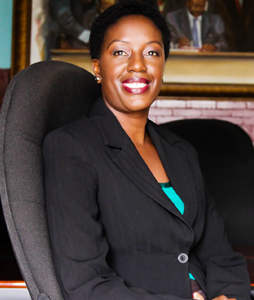
- Born: August 13, 1977 (age 48); Nairobi, Kenya
- Education: Howard University; University of Dallas
- Occupations: Snail farmer, entrepreneur
- Political party: Orange Democratic Movement
- Parent(s): Raila Amolo Odinga, Ida Odinga
- Family: Jaramogi Oginga Odinga (grandfather)

Rosemary Odinga (born August 13, 1977) is a Kenyan entrepreneur. She is known for being a snail farmer.

== Personal life and education ==
Odinga was born August 13, 1977, and is the second child of Ida and the late Raila Odinga, a Kenyan politician. She earned a BA in sociology from Howard University and an MBA in marketing from the University of Dallas.

In 2017 Odinga lost her sight due to a tumor and an aneurysm. She regained her sight in 2019, after treatment at an "Ayurvedic eye hospital-cum-research centre" in Ernakulam, India. She has two daughters.

== Career ==
=== Snail farming ===
Odinga visited former Nigerian president and snail farmer Olusegun Obasanjo, who challenged her to think about farming snails herself. She returned to Kenya and, after researching the University of Nairobi she was given 13 giant African land snails in 2007 from which she started to breed. She built a greenhouse on her farm in Kiserian. By 2015 she had 3,000 snails which she sells through her business, Shelltops Ltd. She specialises in Achatina fulica from East Africa. Of her farming, Odinga was quoted as saying "I believe engaging in farming is a sign of patriotism because one is contributing towards food security."

=== Politics ===
Odinga joined her father’s presidential campaign team in 2007 and in 2013, when she was a member of lobby group 'Nairobi for Raila'. In 2017, she intended to contest the Kibera constituency parliamentary seat but was forced to step down due to her illness.
