= Assawa =

- Country: Kenya
- Province: Nyanza Province
- Time zone: UTC+3 (EAT)

Assawa is a settlement in Kenya's Kisumu County. It is near the Assawa River.

== History ==
Before the Kenyan general election in 2013, Assawa voted as part of the Nyanza Province.
