= Raila Odinga =

Prime Minister of Kenya from 2008 to 2013

The Right Honourable Raila Odinga
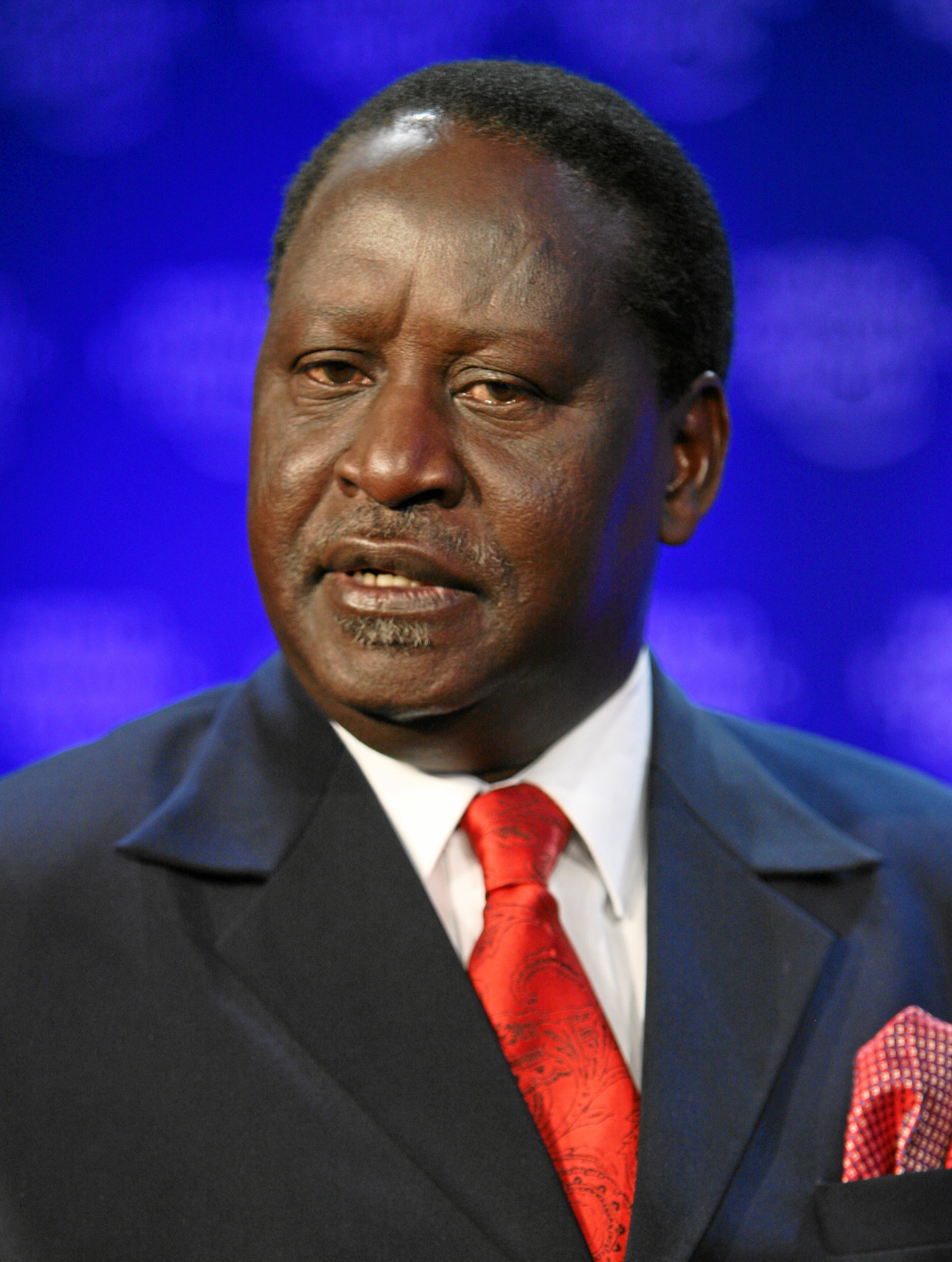
- Odinga in 2009

African Union High Representative for Infrastructure Development
- In office 20 October 2018 – 23 February 2023
- Chair: Moussa Faki
- Preceded by: Elisabeth Tankeu (Commissioner of Trade and Industry)

2nd Prime Minister of Kenya
- In office 17 April 2008 – 9 April 2013
- President: Mwai Kibaki
- Deputy: Musalia Mudavadi; Uhuru Kenyatta
- Preceded by: Jomo Kenyatta (1964)
- Succeeded by: Position abolished

Minister of Roads, Public Works and Housing
- In office 14 January 2003 – 21 November 2005
- President: Mwai Kibaki
- Preceded by: William Cheruiyot Morogo
- Succeeded by: Soita Shitanda

Minister for Energy
- In office 11 June 2001 – 30 December 2002
- President: Daniel arap Moi
- Preceded by: Francis Masakhalia
- Succeeded by: Simeon Nyachae

Member of Parliament for Langata Constituency
- In office 26 January 1993 – 28 March 2013
- Preceded by: Philip Leakey
- Succeeded by: Joash Olum

Personal details
- Born: Raila Amolo Odinga; 7 January 1945 Maseno, Colony and Protectorate of Kenya
- Died: 15 October 2025 (aged 80) Koothattukulam, Kerala, India
- Party: Forum for the Restoration of Democracy (before 1992); Forum for the Restoration of Democracy – Kenya (1992–1994); National Development Party (1994–2002); Kenya African National Union (2000–2002); Liberal Democratic Party (2002–2005); Orange Democratic Movement (2005–2025)
- Other political affiliations: Coalition for Reforms and Democracy (2012–2017); National Super Alliance (2017–2021); Azimio la Umoja-One Kenya Coalition (2022–2025)
- Spouse: Ida Odinga (m. 1973)
- Children: 4 (including Rosemary and Winnie Odinga)
- Parent: Oginga Odinga (father)
- Relatives: Oburu Odinga (brother) Ruth Busia Adhiambo Odinga (sister) Akinyi Wenwa Oranga (sister) Beryl Achieng Odinga (sister)
- Education: Otto von Guericke University Magdeburg
- Website: Official website

Raila Amolo Odinga CGH (7 January 1945 – 15 October 2025) was a Kenyan politician who served as Prime Minister from 2008 to 2013. He was the Member of Parliament (MP) for Langata Constituency from 1992 to 2013. He was also the leader of Azimio la Umoja–One Kenya Coalition Party. Odinga ran for President of Kenya five times, with none of his attempts being successful. Each time Odinga alleged electoral fraud.

In 1997, Odinga finished third as the candidate of the National Development Party (NDP). In 2007, he ran again for the presidency under the Orange Democratic Movement (ODM) and lost to Mwai Kibaki. In 2013, 2017, and 2022, Odinga was the runner-up as a candidate for the Coalition for Reforms and Democracy (CORD), National Super Alliance (NASA), and Azimio la Umoja, respectively.

After his loss, Odinga filed for petition against President-elect William Ruto at the Supreme Court of Kenya. The court decided against him, and Odinga pledged to respect its ruling. In February 2024, he announced his candidacy for the African Union Commission Chairperson but was defeated by Mahamoud Ali Youssouf in the February 2025 ballot.

== Early life and education ==
=== Kenya Colony ===
Raila Odinga, a member of the Joluo ethnic group, was born at the Anglican Church Missionary Society Hospital in Maseno, Kisumu District, Nyanza Province,on 7 January 1945. His parents were Mary Juma Odinga and Jaramogi Oginga Odinga, who served as the first Vice President of Kenya under Jomo Kenyatta. He went to Kisumu Union Primary, Maranda primary in Bondo and Maranda High School, where he studied until 1962, when he was transferred by his father to Germany.

=== East Germany ===
He spent the next two years at the Herder Institution, which trained foreign students in the German language and was part of the philological faculty at the University of Leipzig in East Germany. He received a scholarship that in 1965 sent him to the Technische Hochschule (technical college) of Magdeburg (now a part of Otto von Guericke University Magdeburg) in the GDR. In 1970, he graduated with a master's degree in mechanical engineering. While studying in East Germany during the Cold War, as a Kenyan he was able to visit West Berlin through Checkpoint Charlie. When visiting West Berlin, he used to smuggle goods not available in East Berlin and bring them to his friends in East Germany.

=== Personal life ===
According to his book Flames of Freedom, Odinga showed that he was given a Christian name Rayila upon baptism. Before him being christenend, his father Jaramogi Oginga had refused to give him a Christian name. Jaramogi wrote to a Christian priest informing him of his intention to baptize his three children with purely African names who included Omuoda Agola, Oburu Odinga, and Raila to be baptized. The priest accepted on condition that he first gets them Christian names as those already recognized in the Church. During the real baptism event, Jaramogi refused the set conditions, which made the priest refuse to baptise the three children including Raila Odinga. Him being a traditional African man, Jaramogi had wanted his children to have names of illustrious ancestors which the bishop strongly declined. He had wanted them to be named Ng'ong'a Molo Oburu, Rayila Amolo Odinga and Ngire Omuodo Agola.

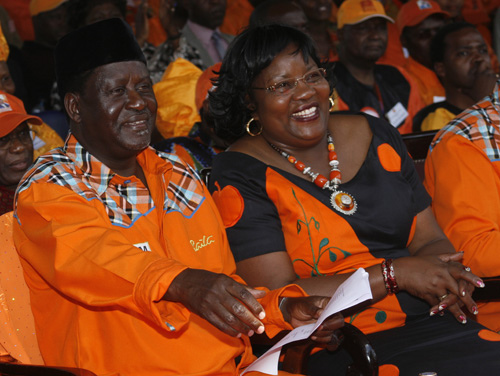
Odinga and his wife Ida at a political rally

Baptised as an Anglican Christian in the Church Missionary Society (CMS) in his childhood, Odinga later became a born-again Christian. Odinga was married to Ida Odinga (Ida Anyango Oyoo). They lived in Karen, Nairobi, and had a second home at Central Farm in Siaya County. The couple had four children: Fidel (1973–2015), Rosemary (born 1977), Raila Jr. (born 1979), and Winnie (born 1990). Fidel was named after Fidel Castro and Winnie after Winnie Mandela.

In an interview with BBC News in January 2008, Odinga asserted that he was the first cousin of US president Barack Obama through Obama's father; however, Barack Obama's paternal uncle denied any direct relation to Odinga, stating "Odinga's mother came from this area, so it is normal for us to talk about cousins. But he is not a blood relative." Odinga briefly played association football for Luo Union (now Gor Mahia) as a midfielder. He was a supporter of English Premier League club Arsenal. Odinga was appointed by the African Union to mediate the 2010–2011 Ivorian crisis, which involved Alassane Ouattara and Laurent Gbagbo. Odinga wrote Flame of Freedom, a 1040-page autobiography which talks about his life from childhood. It was launched on 6 October 2013 in Kenya and subsequently in United States on 15 October 2013.

=== Nicknames ===
Odinga accrued several nicknames during his political career. These include "Tinga", "Hummer", "Baba", "Jakom", "Agwambo", "Joshua", "Rao", and "People's president".

== Early career ==
=== Business and entrepreneurship ===
Odinga returned to Kenya in 1970 and in 1971 he founded the Standard Processing Equipment Construction & Erection Ltd (later renamed East African Spectre), the only company manufacturing liquid petroleum gas cylinders in Kenya.

=== Civil service career ===
In 1974, Odinga was appointed group standards manager of the Kenya Bureau of Standards. After holding this position for four years, he was promoted to be the deputy director in 1978, a post he held until his 1982 detention.

== Political career ==
=== 1982 Kenyan coup attempt ===
At 3 a.m. on Sunday, 1 August 1982, a group of soldiers from the Kenya Air Force led by Senior Private Hezekiah Ochuka attempted to overthrow the government of President Daniel Arap Moi. After the failed attempt to overthrow him, President Moi re-organized Kenya's security architecture, staffing it with his loyalists and then he ensured a law was passed in parliament that gave him emergency powers while placing the provincial administration under the office of the president. Odinga was arrested and charged with treason after being accused of being among the masterminds of the 1982 coup. He was released six years later in February 1988 but was detained again that August; he was finally released in June 1989.

=== Detention ===
In an era of unrelenting human rights abuse by the Kenyan government, Odinga was placed under house arrest for seven months after evidence seemed to implicate him along with his late father Oginga Odinga for collaborating with the plotters of a failed coup attempt against President Daniel Arap Moi in 1982. Hundreds of Kenyan civilians and thousands of rebel soldiers died in the coup. Several foreigners also died. Odinga was later charged with treason and detained without trial for six years.

A biography released 14 years later in July 2006, apparently with Odinga's approval, indicated that Odinga was far more involved in the attempted coup than he had previously admitted. After its publication, some Members of Parliament in Kenya called for Odinga to be arrested and charged, but the statute of limitations had already passed and the information contained in the biography did not amount to an open confession on his part. Among some of his most painful experiences was when his mother died in 1984 but the prison wardens took two months to inform him of her death.

He was released on 6 February 1988 only to be rearrested in September 1988 for his pro-democracy and human rights agitation at a time when the country continued to descend deep into the throes of poor governance and the despotism of single-party rule. Kenya, was then, by law, a one-party state. His encounters with the authoritarian government generated an aura of intrigue about him and it was probably due to this that his political followers christened him "Agwambo", Luo for "The Mystery" or "Unpredictable", or "Jakom", meaning "chairman".

Odinga was released on 12 June 1989, only to be incarcerated again on 5 July 1990, together with Kenneth Matiba, and former Nairobi mayor Charles Rubia, both multiparty system and human rights crusaders. Odinga was finally released on 21 June 1991, and in October he fled the country to Norway amid indications that the increasingly corrupt Kenyan government was attempting to assassinate him without success.

=== Multi-party politics ===
At the time of Odinga's departure to Norway, the Forum for the Restoration of Democracy (FORD), a movement formed to agitate for the return of multi-party democracy to Kenya, was newly formed. In February 1992, Odinga returned to join FORD, then led by his father Jaramogi Oginga Odinga. He was elected Vice Chairman of the General Purposes Committee of the party. In the months running up to the 1992 General Election, FORD split into FORD-Kenya, led by Odinga's father Jaramogi Oginga Odinga, and FORD-Asili led by Kenneth Matiba. Odinga became Ford-Kenya's Deputy Director of Elections. Odinga won the Langata Constituency parliamentary seat, previously held by Philip Leakey of KANU. Odinga became the second father of multi-party democracy in Kenya after Kenneth Matiba. When Jaramogi Oginga Odinga died in January 1994 and Michael Wamalwa Kijana succeeded him as FORD-Kenya chairman, Odinga challenged him for the party leadership. The elections were marred by controversy after which Odinga resigned from FORD-Kenya to join the National Development Party (NDP).

=== Member of Parliament ===
In his first bid for the presidency in the 1997 Kenyan general election, Odinga finished third after President Moi, the incumbent, and Democratic Party candidate Mwai Kibaki. He however retained his position as the Langata MP.

=== KANU-NDP merger ===
Immediately after the 1997 election, Odinga appeared alongside Kibaki to denounce the results, saying that they were rigged. In the subsequent months, however, he forged a deal to support Moi, entering into a cooperation deal between his party, NDP, and Moi's KANU party. He accepted a position in Moi's cabinet as Energy Minister, serving from June 2001 to 2002, during Moi's final term. In 2002, the NDP and KANU formally merged, with the NDP being dissolved and the new party being dubbed the "New KANU". In the subsequent KANU elections held later that year, he was elected the party's Secretary General (replacing Joseph Kamotho).

In 2002, much to the chagrin of Odinga and many other hopefuls in the party, Moi endorsed Uhuru Kenyatta – son of Kenya's first president Jomo Kenyatta but a relative newcomer in politics – to be his successor. Moi publicly asked Odinga and others to support Uhuru as well. This was taken as an affront by many of the party loyalists who felt they were being asked to make way for a newcomer who, unlike them, had done little to build the party. Odinga and other KANU members, including Kalonzo Musyoka, George Saitoti, and Joseph Kamotho, opposed this step arguing that the then 38-year-old Uhuru was politically inexperienced and lacked the leadership qualities needed to govern. Moi stood his ground, maintaining that the country's leadership needed to pass to the younger generation as well as someone that Moi could rely on personally.

Dissent ran through the party with some members openly disagreeing with Moi, despite his reputation as an autocrat. It was then that the Rainbow Movement was founded, comprising disgruntled KANU members who exited KANU. The exodus, led by Odinga, saw most big names fleeing the party. Moi was left with his handpicked successor almost alone with a party reduced to an empty shell with poor electoral prospects. The Rainbow Movement went on to join the Liberal Democratic Party (LDP), which later teamed up with opposition Mwai Kibaki's National Alliance Party of Kenya (NAK), a coalition of several other parties, to form the National Rainbow Coalition (NARC).

=== National Rainbow Coalition ===
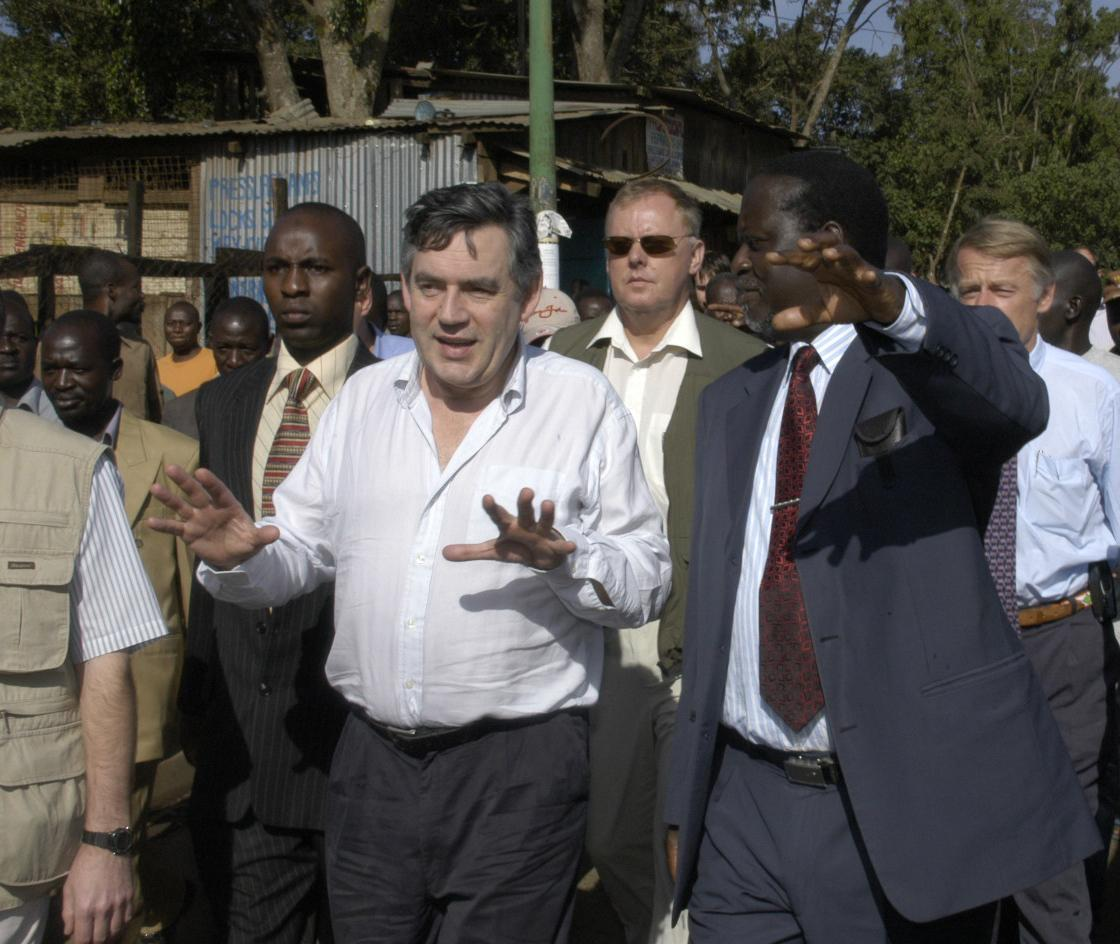
Odinga with Gordon Brown at Kibera

Amid fears that this opposition "super alliance" would fail to unite and rally behind a common candidate as in previous occasions and thus easily hand victory to the government, Odinga declared Kibaki tosha, Swahili for "Kibaki is sufficient", an endorsement of a Kibaki ticket. This resolved the matter of candidacy and Narc went on to defeat Moi's protege, Uhuru Kenyatta. Kibaki himself had been injured in a road accident prior to the election, leaving Odinga and others to lead the campaign for him.

On assuming office, President Kibaki did not appoint Odinga as prime minister in the new government, contrary to a pre-election Memorandum Of Understanding. (Kenya's constitution had no provision for prime minister yet); neither did he give LDP (Odinga's faction) half of the cabinet positions as per the MOU. He instead sought to entrench and increase his own NAK's side in cabinet, even appointing MPs from the opposition parties (KANU and FORD people) to the cabinet.

The perceived "betrayal" started a simmering disquiet which in time led to an open rebellion and a split within the cabinet. A key point of disagreement was a proposed new constitution for the country, which was a major campaign issue that had united Kibaki's NAK and Odinga's LDP in the campaign. This constitution included provisions to trim presidential powers to rein in what was seen as an autocratic presidency, a feature of both the Moi and first president Jomo Kenyatta's regimes which had led to a lot of power abuse and an unaccountable leadership. This proposed document was called the "Bomas Draft", but Kibaki's government opposed it and withdrew from the process in March 2004.

=== 2005 referendum ===
Kibaki's government went on to write a new proposed Constitution which had a reduced role for parliament and the new prime minister compared with the Bomas Draft, instead retaining more powers for the presidency. Odinga opposed this and went on to campaign with his LDP cabinet colleagues on the referendum 'No' side, opposing the president and his lieutenants in a bruising countrywide campaign. When the document was put to a referendum on 21 November 2005, the government lost by a 57% to 43% margin. Embarrassingly for Kibaki, out of 8 provinces, only one (Central Province where his tribe the Kikuyu are dominant) voted "yes" for the document, isolating his own tribe from the rest of Kenya and exposing his campaign as ethnic-based. In the aftermath of the referendum, Kibaki sacked the entire cabinet on 23 November 2005. When it was reconstituted two weeks later, Odinga and several of his allies were not given a role, while many others from the LDP group and FORD-Kenya refused the posts they were offered.

=== Orange Democratic Movement ===
Odinga led the formation of a new opposition outfit, the Orange Democratic Movement (ODM) – an Orange was the symbol for the "No" vote in the constitutional referendum. In January 2006, Odinga was reported to have told police that he believed his life was in danger, having received assassination threats.

=== Unconstitutional swearing in as people's president ===
Having lost the 2017 election to Uhuru Kenyatta, and boycotted the rerun, Odinga had himself sworn in as "the people's president". Miguna Miguna, who administered the oath, was deported, while Odinga faced no consequences.

=== Handshake with Kenyatta ===
In March 2018, Odinga and Kenyatta had a political handshake intended to cool the political temperatures after the 2017 Kenyan general election. The handshake resulted in William Ruto being sidelined in the Government he formed with Uhuru Kenya, with Raila Odinga being elevated to de facto Deputy President of the Republic of Kenya. The handshake gave birth to the Building Bridges Initiative alias BBI.

=== Building Bridges Initiative ===
Following the March 2018 truce between Odinga and President Kenyatta, the two commissioned a joint task force that would collect views from Kenyans and report their findings. After touring the country and holding consultative sessions, the team compiled and submitted the report to President Kenyatta at State House, Nairobi on 26 November 2019 which was followed by a public launch at the Bomas of Kenya the following day. The efforts by Kenyatta and Odinga to bring peace and cohesion in the country were applauded by several leaders locally and internationally with the duo being invited to a National Prayer Breakfast International Lunch in Washington DC, US in February 2020. In 2022 the Supreme Court of Kenya upheld an earlier ruling made by the high court stating that the BBI was unconstitutional.

=== African Union Representative ===
Odinga was appointed High Representative for Infrastructure Development at the African Union Commission in 2018. He was relieved of his duties by the entity on 23 February 2023, the day after he incited his supporters to violence through mass action.

=== Announcement of fifth bid for president ===
On 10 December 2021, Odinga announced that he was eyeing a fifth stab at the presidency, putting an end to months of suspense after his surprise truce with President Kenyatta. His announcement was made while launching the Azimio La Umoja Convention – which would be his vehicle to State House – held at the Kasarani Stadium in Nairobi.

=== Chairperson of African Union ===
Kenya nominated Odinga as its candidate for the Chairperson of the African Union Commission (AUC) in February 2024. Odinga sought to harness Africa's natural and human resources to ensure prosperity. His priorities included advancing the African Continental Free Trade Area, managing conflicts, and enhancing Africa's global influence. On 15 February 2025, Odinga finished as the runner-up, having been defeated by Mahamoud Ali Youssouf in the election for Chairperson of the African Union, succeeding Chad's Moussa Faki. The election, held in Addis Ababa, Ethiopia, was decided by the member states of the African Union after seven rounds of voting.

== Presidential elections ==
=== 2007 presidential election ===
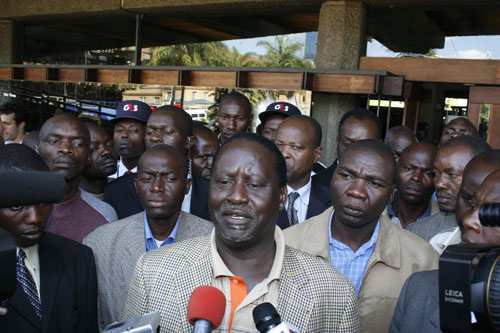
Odinga addressing the Kenyan media during the 2007–08 Kenyan crisis

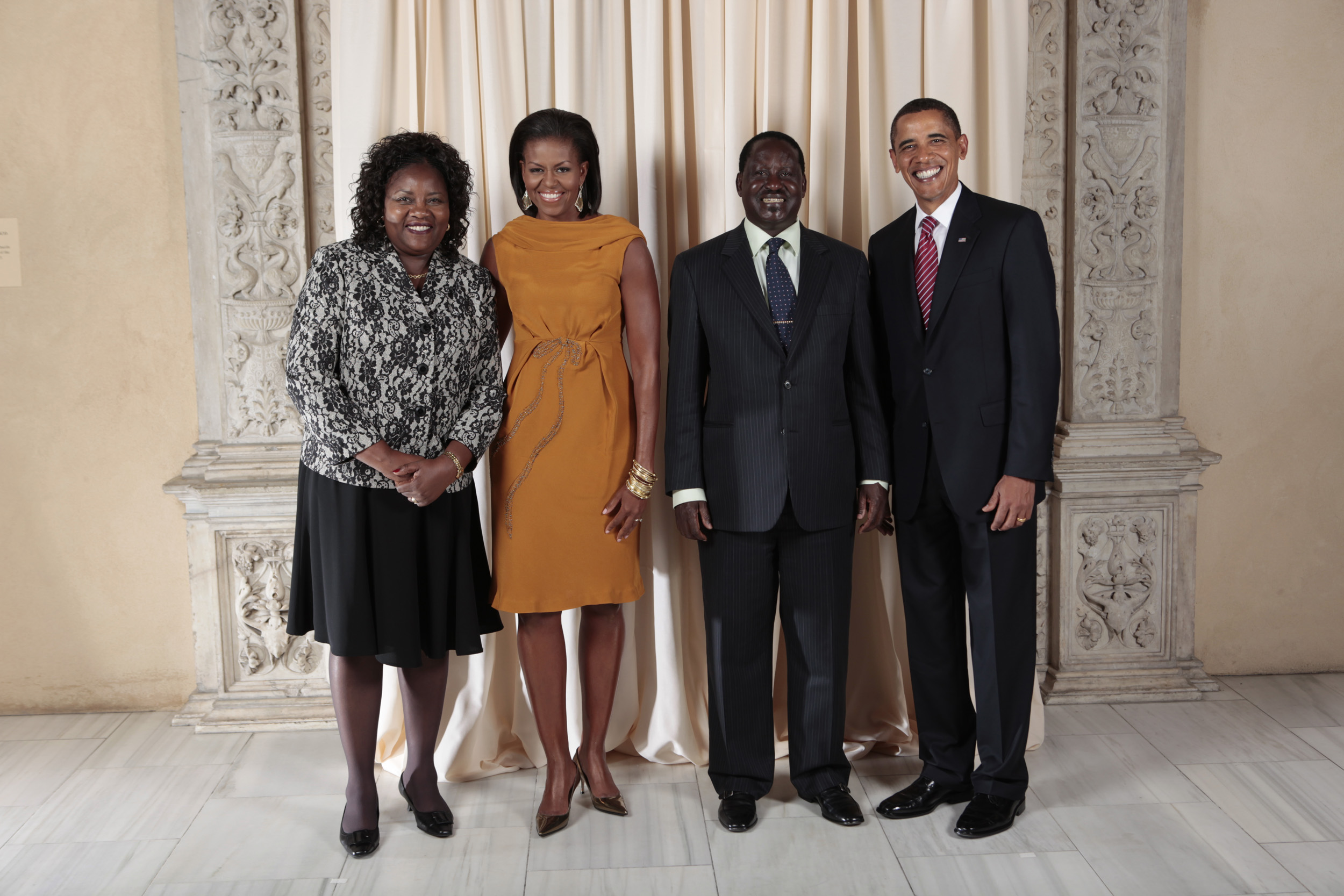
President Barack Obama and First Lady Michelle Obama of the United States pose for a photo during a reception at the Metropolitan Museum in New York with Odinga and his wife Ida Odinga (2009).

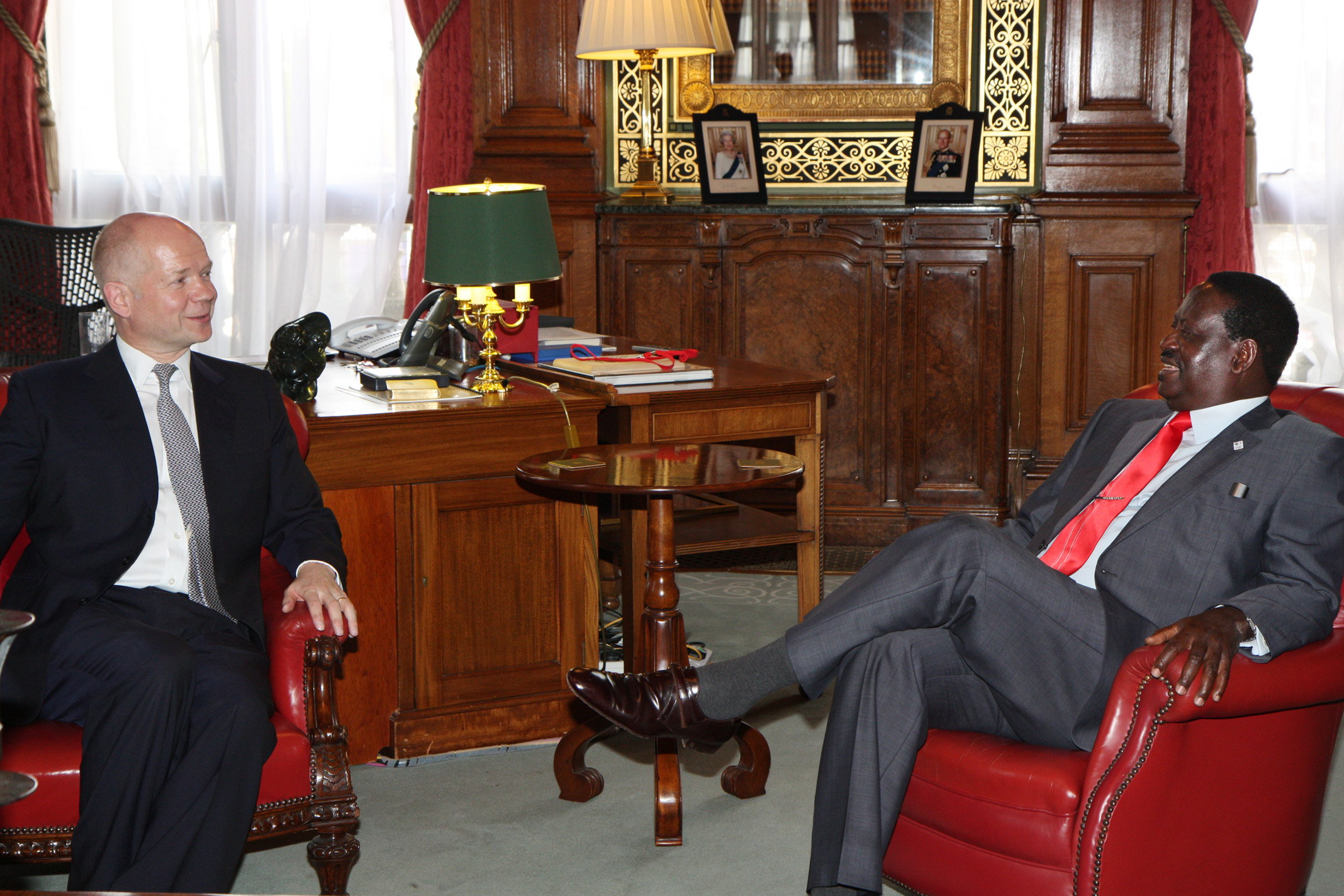
British Foreign Secretary William Hague meeting Odinga, then Prime Minister of Kenya, in London, 10 August 2012

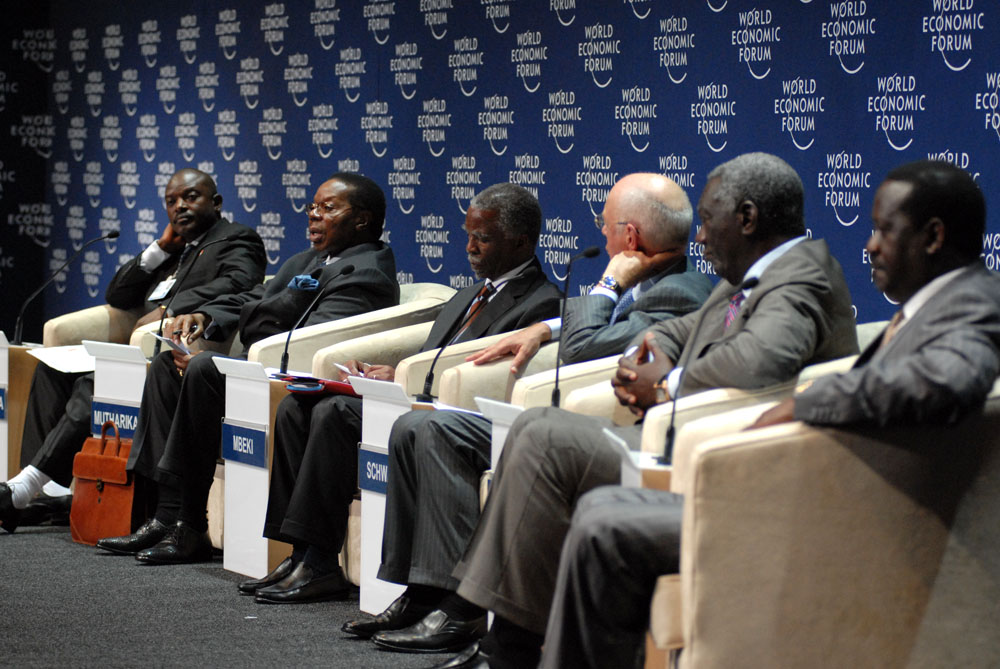
Odinga, Prime Minister of Kenya, with, from left, Pierre Nkurunziza, President of Burundi, Bingu Wa Mutharika, President of Malawi, Thabo Mbeki, President of South Africa, Klaus Schwab, Founder and Executive chairman, World Economic Forum, and John Agyekum Kufuor, President of Ghana, during the Opening Plenary of the World Economic Forum on Africa 2008 in Cape Town, South Africa, 4 June 2008

On 12 July 2007, with Kibaki's reelection bid drawing close, Odinga alleged that the government was withholding identity cards from voters in opposition strongholds with the intention to skew the election in favour of Kibaki. He also claimed that the intended creation of 30 new constituencies was a means by the government to fraudulently engineer victory in the December 2007 parliamentary election. In August 2007, Odinga's own Orange Democratic Movement-Kenya suffered a setback when it split into two, with Odinga becoming head of the Orange Democratic Movement (ODM) while the other faction, the ODM-K, was headed by Kalonzo Musyoka who parted ways with Odinga.

On 1 September 2007, the ODM elected Odinga as its presidential candidate in a National Delegates Conference held at the Moi International Sports Centre in Nairobi. Odinga received 2,656 votes; the only other candidates who received significant numbers of votes were Musalia Mudavadi with 391 and William Ruto with 368. Earlier, Najib Balala had withdrawn his candidature and endorsed Odinga. The defeated candidates expressed their support for Odinga afterwards, and Mudavadi was named as his running mate.

Odinga's bid for the presidency however failed when after the 27 December presidential election, the Electoral Commission declared Kibaki the winner on 30 December 2007, placing him ahead of Odinga by about 232,000 votes. Jeffrey Sachs (Professor of Economics and Director of the Earth Institute at Columbia University, and Special Advisor to former UN Secretary-General) faulted the United States' approach to the post-election crisis and recommended an independent recount of the vote.

Odinga and ODM leaders rallied against the decision, with James Orengo and Anyang' Nyong'o calling for mass action. Violence broke out in the country. The government responded by deploying police and paramilitary units to counter public protests. Following two months of unrest, which led to the death of about 1,000 people and the displacement of about 250,000, a deal between Odinga and Kibaki, which provided for power-sharing and the creation of the post of prime minister, was signed in February 2008; it was brokered by former UN Secretary-General Kofi Annan. Odinga was sworn in as prime minister, along with the power-sharing Cabinet, on 17 April 2008. The post of prime minister was last held by Jomo Kenyatta between 1963 and 1964 following independence. Odinga was thus the second person in Kenya's history to hold the position.

=== 2013 presidential election ===
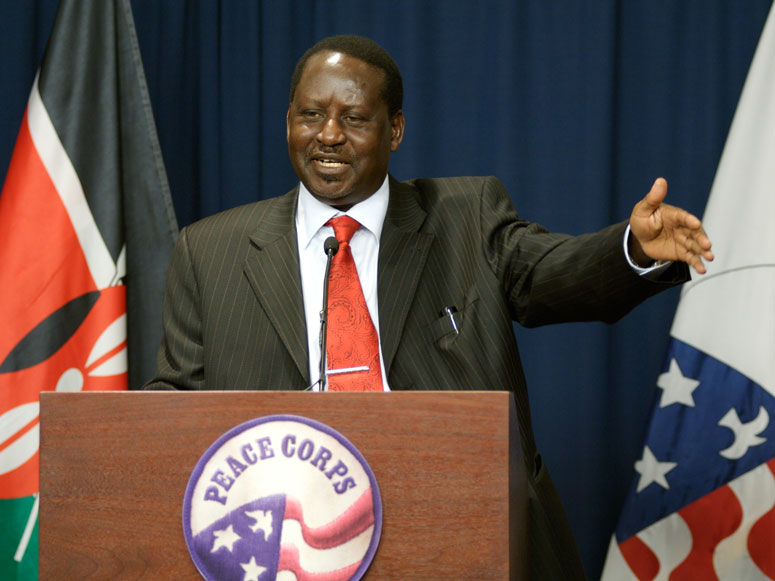
Odinga speaking at a visit to Peace Corps

The next presidential election in which Odinga was to run was the 2013 March poll, involving Kibaki's handover of power. Uncertainty loomed over Odinga's main rivals, Uhuru Kenyatta and William Ruto, who had both been indicted by the ICC of the Hague for their alleged role in the 2007 election violence. Despite their pending case, the duo had been nominated by the Jubilee party with Uhuru as presidential candidate and Ruto as running mate. A Synovate survey released in October 2012 found Odinga to enjoy a leading 45 percent approval rate against Uhuru and Ruto.

To contest the election, Odinga's ODM joined Kalonzo Musyoka's Wiper Party and Moses Wetangula's Ford Kenya in a coalition known as CORD (Coalition for Reforms and Democracy). Odinga was named as the coalition's presidential candidate, with Kalonzo as his running mate. Their opponents were a coalition known as The National Alliance, consisting of Kenyatta's Jubilee Party, Ruto's United Republican Party, NARC (now headed by Charity Ngilu), and Najib Balala's (Republican Congress – RC)).

A number of western countries were not in favour of the Uhuru and Ruto candidacy in view of their pending ICC cases and association with "crimes against humanity". Former UN Secretary-General Kofi Annan voiced his reservations, as did former U.S. Assistant Secretary of State for African Affairs Johnnie Carson who cautioned against the election of Uhuru Kenyatta and William Ruto. He was notably quoted as saying that "Choices have consequences", referring to the fate of U.S.-Kenyan relations, with a Uhuru administration.

Odinga ran for president in the elections held on 4 March 2013 and garnered 5,340,546 votes (43.70%) out of the 12,221,053 valid votes cast. The winner, Uhuru Kenyatta garnered 6,173,433 votes (50.51%). As this was above the 50% plus 1 vote threshold, the IEBC declared Uhuru the president-elect in the first round without requiring a run-off between the top two candidates.

However, in a press conference shortly after the results were announced, Odinga said that the election had been marred by the manual tallying process and that he would appeal the result to contest the result in Kenya's highest court, The Supreme Court. In anticipation of the legal challenge, Odinga and his lawyers George Oraro, Mutula Kilonzo, and James Orengo, secretly instructed Raj Pal Senna, a Management Consultant from Barcelona to carry out a forensic investigation of the technology used in the Kenyan General Election 2013, during which the IEBC made claims on TV and media that there were "technological challenges", that servers overloaded and that the database crashed.

During the Petition hearing, Chief Justice Willy Mutunga made a finding rejecting the second affidavit of Odinga which comprised 900 pages, on the basis that it amounted to "new evidence", which is not permitted under the Constitution. Subsequently, the Supreme Court issued a ruling dismissing the petition on 30 March 2013. The Supreme Court while declaring Uhuru the next president also declared that the IEBC should not have included the invalid/spoilt votes in the calculation of the final figures and percentages. Chief Justice Willy Mutunga also directed that the EACC (Ethics and Anti Corruption Commission) and the DPP (Director of Public Prosecutions) carry out a criminal investigation of the IEBC in relation to the BVR, EVID, RTS and RPS.

Odinga and his team did not attend Kenyatta's April 2013 inauguration, which marked the end of his tenure as prime minister, travelling instead to South Africa. The full findings of the supreme court investigation were later published as the OpCo Report, and inspired a documentary by documentary by KTN journalists John Namu and Mohammed Ali titled "50+1 – The Inside Story".

=== 2017 presidential elections ===
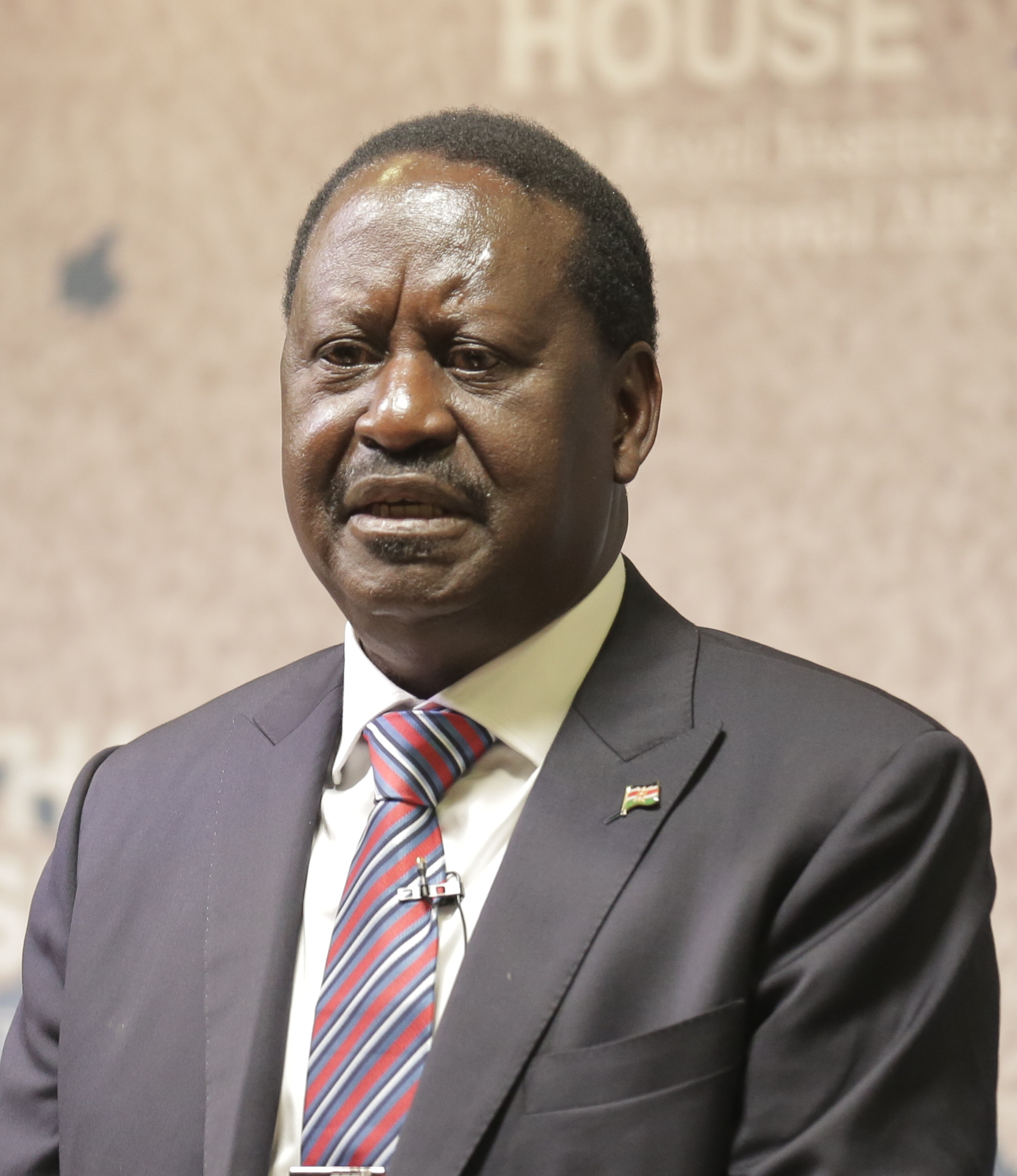
Odinga in 2017

==== Claims of election rigging ====
Odinga, through his lawyers James Orengo, Otiende Amollo and Clifford Ochieng claimed that forces associated with his main competitor Uhuru Kenyatta had hacked into the IEBC (Kenya's electoral body) server and tampered with its database. He stated that the results that were being transmitted by IEBC were false because they had been manipulated via a computer algorithm designed to maintain an 11% gap between him and Uhuru's votes. As such, he proved the votes were not real votes cast by human voters but the outcome of a computer generated formula producing artificial values. This intrusion into IEBC's system, he further said, affected not just the presidential results but the entire election, including the votes cast for MPs, senators, governors and women representatives. He called the alleged intrusion "the biggest vote theft in Kenya's history". Later while vote tallying was still in progress and the country was awaiting the announcement of the final results, Odinga revealed that his team had received information from a confidential source in IEBC indicating that results from its server showed him leading with an unassailable 8.04 million votes over Uhuru's 7.75 million votes. Based on this, he demanded he be declared the fifth president of Kenya. The IEBC however rejected Odinga's contention, saying the winner could not be announced before the tallying was complete and also being an independent body it could not be compelled by one of the candidates to announce the results. The IEBC finally announced the results declaring Uhuru the winner with 8.1 million votes against Odinga's 6.7 million. The results showed massive losses for NASA, with Jubilee invading traditional NASA strongholds. NASA refused to recognize the results. Shortly after Uhuru's declared victory, violence was reported in some parts of the country which are opposition strongholds. However the violence was not of the scale witnessed in the 2007 election aftermath and broke out only sporadically.

==== Annulment of the presidential election ====
After initially declining to take his case to court on the grounds that the court had previously made an unfavourable judgment against him, Odinga reconsidered and lodged a petition. After 2 days of hearings, the judges in a majority 4–2 decision returned a verdict on 1 September annulling the presidential results and ordered a new election to be held within 60 days. The court decision, read by Chief Justice David Maraga and widely viewed as unprecedented both in Africa and globally, held that the IEBC failed to conduct the election in the manner provided by the Constitution and so could not stand.

Despite the Supreme Court ruling, Odinga announced his withdrawal from the presidential election, scheduled for 26 October, on 10 October. The reason for his withdrawal was his belief that the election would again not be free or fair, since no electoral process reforms had been made since the annulment of the last election, as well as various defections which occurred from his coalition. The IEBC later stated that Odinga had not officially withdrawn from the race for presidency and his name would still appear on the ballot on 26 October among other candidates who contested the 8 August General Elections. This resulted in violent uproar in various parts of the country some few days before and after the repeat polls especially in the NASA dominated zones. Alleged police brutality was reported as independent medic research organization (IMLU) cited 39 deaths and a high number of assault cases.

=== Swearing in as people's president ===
On 30 January, Odinga staged a swearing-in ceremony in Nairobi where he named himself "People's President". During and a while after this ceremony, the government through Communications Authority of Kenya shutdown TV stations and a few radio stations across Kenya to prevent live coverage of the event, a move which was criticised by the media freedom campaigners. Political tension was at its height throughout the country.

=== 2018 handshake ===
On 9 March 2018, amidst the heightened political tension and in an unexpected move, Odinga and president Uhuru Kenyatta shook hands at Harambee House, in what is widely known as the 2018 Handshake and made a joint televised appearance, in which they referred to each other as "brothers", and agreed to put aside political differences to allow Kenya to move forward. This brought to an end the then acrimony between the two major political divides.

=== 2022 presidential elections ===
I Raila Amolo Odinga, having been faithful and committed to building a national, democratic, and progressive Kenya in our lifetime, having worked with many patriotic Kenyans to achieve this goal, I do hereby accept to present myself as a presidential candidate at the presidential election on 9 August 2022, following the request and unanimous decision of this Azimio la Umoja.

— Raila Odinga, 10 December 2021

Odinga was cleared to run for the presidency for the fifth time on 5 June 2022 by the Independent Electoral and Boundaries Commission (IEBC). He filed his candidacy papers as a candidate for the Azimio La Umoja–One Kenya Coalition party with the IEBC. Martha Karua was Odinga's running mate. On 6 June, Odinga launched his 10-point manifesto at the Nyayo stadium, flanked by his running mate, and hundreds of his supporters detailing his plan for the first 100 days in office if his camp carries the day in the August election. Odinga outlined a key component of his vision for the country, dubbed "the People's Programmes", which he promised as the foundation for his platform. Social protection, universal healthcare, job development, women's empowerment, investing in youth, education for all, food security, water for everyone, enterprise Kenya, and building on past triumphs were all part of the ten-point plan. He vied for the presidency against United Democratic Alliance's candidate William Ruto who garnered 50.5% of votes cast. After coming second in the presidential election, he filed a legal case challenging the result, which was dismissed by the Supreme Court.

== Political positions ==
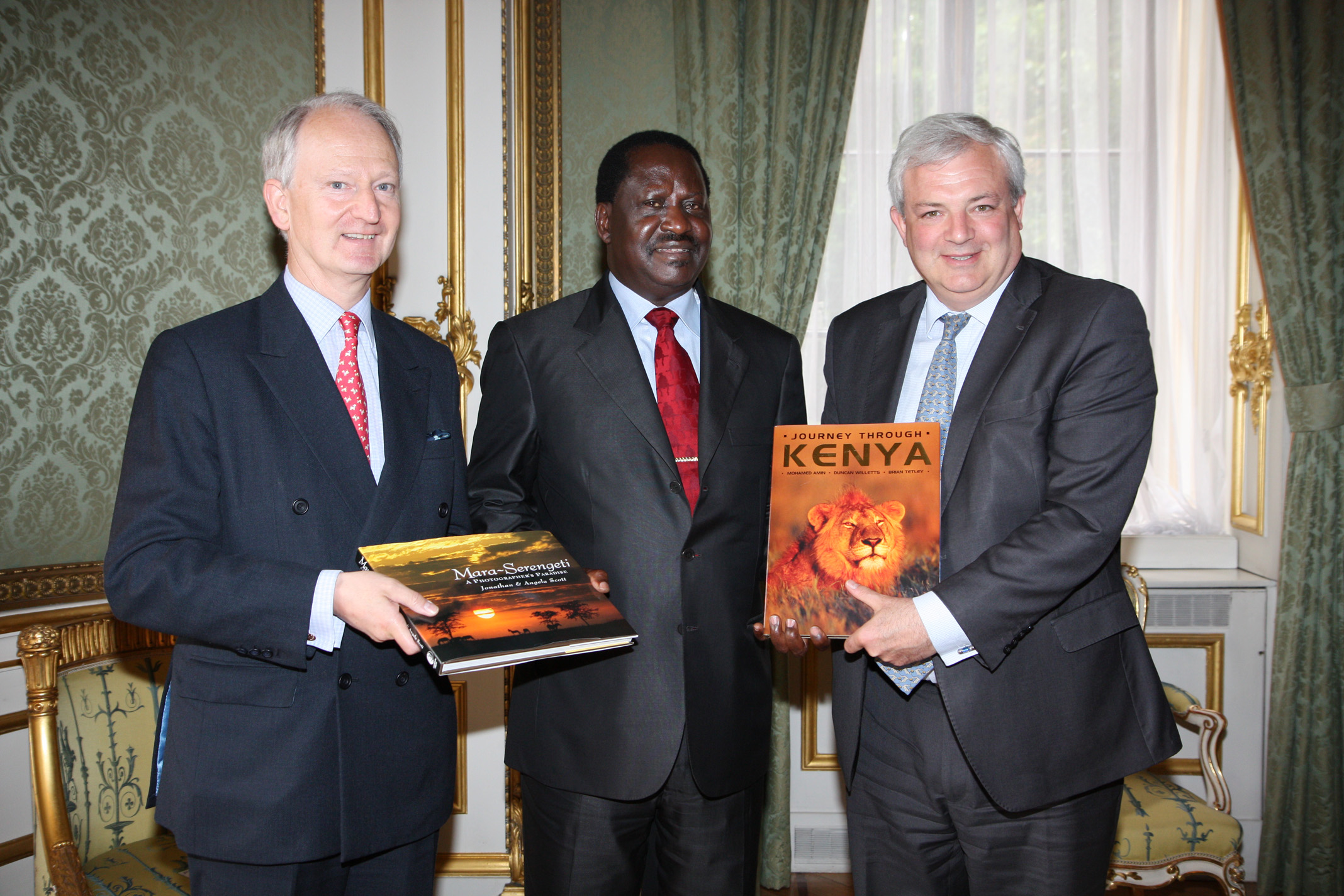
British Foreign Office Minister Henry Bellingham meeting Odinga in London, 7 July 2011

Odinga's political ideology can be loosely styled as social democracy, more closely aligned with American left-wing politics. His position was once in favour of a parliamentary system as he initially backed a constitution giving executive powers to a prime minister; he subsequently changed his position to support a presidential system with a devolved power structure, which is reflected in Kenya's Constitution.

Odinga was seen as one of the main forces behind the devolution now enshrined in the constitution as an essential part of Kenya's governance system. He is also noted for his contribution to the evolution of multi-party democracy in Kenya and his desire to see the country have a Western-style democratic system. Due to an economic downturn and extreme drought, Odinga called for the suspension of taxes on fuels and certain foods that disproportionately impact the poor.

On social issues, Odinga took a more conservative line. On LGBT issues, Odinga stated that "the constitution is very clear on this issue and men or women found engaging in homosexuality will not be spared", adding, "If we find a man engaging in homosexuality or a woman in lesbianism, we'll arrest them and put them in jail". These comments were widely condemned from LGBT activists, who stated that his rhetoric put the lives of LGBT Kenyans in danger. In response, his office walked back Odinga's statement, claiming he only meant to clarify that same-sex marriage is illegal under the constitution.

== Death and funeral ==
Odinga died from a cardiac arrest at the Devamatha Hospital at Koothattukulam in Kerala, India, on 15 October 2025, at the age of 80. He had collapsed while taking a routine morning walk at the Sreedhareeyam Ayurvedic Eye Hospital and Research Centre, where he had been seeking medical treatment for diabetes, hypertension and chronic kidney disease. Shortly after his death, Indian prime minister Narendra Modi published a tweet honouring Odinga's legacy, describing him as a "towering statesman and a cherished friend of India". Kenyan President William Ruto announced a state funeral and a seven-day period of mourning with flags placed at half-mast, with Friday 17 October also declared as a public holiday. South African president Cyril Ramaphosa and Tanzanian president Samia Suluhu as well as various politicians across the globe paid tribute and expressed their respects.

Kenya Airways, which carried his corpse, renamed its flight KQ203 to RAO001, a special code assigned in his honour as the aircraft entered Kenyan airspace. On 16 October, thousands of mourners gathered at Jomo Kenyatta International Airport in Nairobi to receive Odinga's body, briefly halting operations and disrupting a state ceremony attended by President Ruto. Waving flags and twigs, some supporters broke through airport barriers as the coffin was unloaded, forcing the Kenya Airports Authority (KAA) to issue a two-hour suspension of flights and closure of the country's airspace.

Crowds gathered outside the Parliament Buildings, where Odinga was to be accorded a state public viewing in keeping with a long-standing government protocol. To accommodate the massive, surging crowds that had gathered outside parliament and at the airport, officials were forced to move the ceremony to a much larger venue, redirecting the procession and public viewing of Odinga's body to the Moi International Sports Centre. At least four people were killed after police opened fire to crowd control tens of thousands of people mourning following a gate breach at the stadium. On 17 October, Doctors Without Borders reported that two people had died and more than 160 others were injured in a stampede at the state funeral. Odinga was buried next to his father on 19 October 2025 at his residence in Bondo.

== Controversies and misinformation ==
=== Miguna Miguna claims ===
During his premiership, Odinga appointed Miguna Miguna as his advisor on coalition affairs, whom he later suspended in August 2011, citing "gross misconduct". The Daily Nation quoted his reason for suspension as being "accused of misrepresenting the office of the Prime Minister, possibly a reference to his having aired strong views which may have embarrassed the PM". Miguna Miguna later published controversial books about his working relationship with Odinga. According to one of Miguna Miguna's books, Peeling Back the Mask: A Quest for Justice in Kenya, instances of abuse of office, corruption, political trickery as well as public deception were planned, coordinated and covered up in Odinga's office in the three years where he worked there as an advisor of Odinga.

His suspension came at a time when the electoral body, the IIEC, was in an uproar and unsettled by anonymously authored complaints which the commissioners characterise as a hate campaign but which raise troubling questions on corruption and nepotism. Later Miguna, after suspension, issued a statement that said he "was instructed to write my article on the IIEC chairman and the position he had taken with respect to the party's decision to kick out rebellious MPs and Councillors". He later denied this, according to the Nairobi Star.

=== Maize scandal ===
During Odinga's tenure, the office of the prime minister was implicated in the 'Kazi kwa Vijana scandal' whereby a World Bank funded project was suspended due to embezzlement of funds. Similarly, the 'Maize scandal' whereby aflatoxin contaminated maize was imported into Kenya was also linked to The Office of the Prime Minister leading to the suspension of Odinga's top aides Permanent Secretary Mohammed Isahakia and Chief of Staff Caroli Omondi.

=== 2019 gold scam ===
Odinga has been reportedly linked to a 2019 multi-million dollar advance-fee scam of non-existent and "fake gold" in Kenya by a number of politicians from both sides of the political divide in Kenya. According to the reports UAE Prime Minister Mohammed bin Rashid Al Maktoum's cousin lost money in disguised transactions for non-existent or otherwise "fake gold" in Kenya. In May 2019, in a leaked video recording, a voice of Moses Wetangula, the then senator of Bungoma, appeared to implicate Odinga in a gold deal gone sour, a deal in which millions of dollars were lost by the UAE royal family in an advance fee scam of non-existent gold in Kenya. In the same video as was reported Wetangula claimed Odinga runs ODM like a gestapo where nothing happens without his concessions, and that Odinga met the president to explain the matter of the gold deal. In the same month Odinga claimed that he was the one that outed the confidence tricksters to the Dubai-based complainants. Later in the same month a number of political leaders in Kenya called for Odinga to be investigated by the DCI for international conmanship. The legislators claimed they had compelling evidence against Odinga. According to them Odinga cannot be part of a criminal transaction and then claim to be a whistleblower at the same time, whilst being a direct individual beneficiary of proceeds of the scam.

=== NYS scandal ===
In 2018 Kipchumba Murkomen, who was then the senator from Elgeyo Marakwet, linked Odinga to the NYS scandal, in which KES1.6 billion was lost through corruption. He linked Odinga and Suna East MP Junet Mohamed, alleging they had pocketed some of the money. Odinga termed the claims untrue. Political analyst Mutahi Ngunyi accused Odinga of having killed the development agenda spearheaded by NYS, thus killing the dreams of young people in Kibera.

=== Misinformation on various social media ===
During the August 2022 Kenyan general election, Odinga was the subject of several false claims and fake news stories. One example of misinformation involved a fabricated image of a banknote with Odinga's face on it. This image was circulated on social media, and some people believed that it was a legitimate banknote; however, fact-checkers confirmed that the image was a satire and not a real banknote.

Misinformation was spread through old or outdated photos. For example, a photo claiming to show Odinga collapsing at his Karen home was circulated on social media. It was found that the photo was not recent and had been taken out of context. Video footage can also be manipulated to spread false information. A video claiming to show Odinga partying while William Ruto was at the presidential campaign was shared on social media; however, PesaCheck confirmed that the video was fake and had been doctored. Photos were circulated that claimed to show youth disrupting Odinga's rally in Embakasi, Nairobi; however, PesaCheck confirmed that the photos were not related to the rally, and they were taken at a different location.

It was falsely claimed that Azimio's Narok gubernatorial candidate, Moitalel Ole Kenta, had disowned Odinga. PesaCheck found that the claim was false, and Moitalel Ole Kenta had not made any such statement. A fake tweet attributed to Ruto was circulated on social media, congratulating Odinga for winning the 2022 presidential election. PesaCheck confirmed that the tweet was fake and had not been posted by William Ruto. Another fake congratulatory statement allegedly from the US Embassy in Nairobi was circulating on social media where Odinga was being applauded on his "win" in the 9 August 2022 Kenyan general elections. This statement was looked into by PesaCheck who found out that the statement was FAKE. To firm this up, Andrew Veveiros who is the embassy spokesperson also shared an email to PesaCheck to dismiss the congratulatory statement by the US Embassy to Odinga.

Doctored presidential election results were also being shared across different media platforms. Of key interest was a fake statement shared on Facebook claiming that two local media houses, namely Royal Media Services and The Standard Group, had called the elections in favour of Odinga. According to this fake statement, Odinga was leading the 2022 presidential elections with 51.13% while Ruto was at 48.22%. These claims were denounced by the media houses' senior editors and PesaCheck also confirmed that they were fake.

== Honours and awards ==
=== Honorary degrees ===
University	Country	Honour	Year
University of Nairobi	Kenya	Doctor of Laws	2008
Florida A&M University	United States	Honorary degree	2012
Limkokwing University of Creative Technology	Malaysia	Doctorate of Leadership in Social Development	2012

=== Order of the Golden Heart of Kenya ===
Posthumously Odinga was awarded the title of Chief of the Order of the Golden Heart of Kenya (C.G.H.) during the 2025 Mashujaa Day celebrations by President William Ruto in recognition of his service to the Kenyan nation.

== See also ==
- Edwin Sifuna
- Kasmuel McOure
- Luo people

National Assembly (Kenya)
Preceded by Philip Leakey	Member of the National Assembly of Kenya for Langata; 1992–2013	Succeeded by Joash Olum
Party political offices
First	NDP nominee for President of Kenya; 1997	Party dissolved
New political party	ODM nominee for President of Kenya; 2007, 2013, Aug 2017, Oct 2017, 2022	
New political alliance	CORD nominee for President of Kenya; 2013	Alliance dissolved
New political alliance	Azimio nominee for President of Kenya; 2022	
Political offices
Preceded by Francis Masakhalia	Minister for Energy; 2001–2002	Succeeded by Simeon Nyachae
Preceded by William Cheruiyot Morogo	Minister of Roads, Public Works and Housing; 2003–2005	Succeeded by Soita Shitanda
Vacant Title last held by Jomo Kenyatta; 1963	Prime Minister of Kenya; 2008–2013	Vacant Title next held by Musalia Mudavadi; 2022 as Prime Cabinet Secretary of Kenya
Preceded by Uhuru Kenyatta	Leader of the Opposition; 2013–2025	Succeeded by Vacant
Diplomatic posts
Preceded by Elisabeth Tankeu as Commissioner of Trade and Industry	African Union High Representative for Infrastructure Development; 2018–2025	Succeeded by Vacant
