= Seme Constituency =

Electoral constituency in Kenya

Seme
- constituency for the Parliament of Kenya
- Seme Constituency within Kisumu County

- Kisumu County within Kenya
- County: Kisumu
- Population: 121,667
- Area: 268 km^{2} (103.5 sq mi)

Current constituency
- Number of members: 1
- Party: ODM
- Member of Parliament: James Nyikal
- Wards: 4

Seme is a constituency in Kenya. It is one of seven constituencies in Kisumu County. The current Member of Parliament for Seme Constituency is the Honourable James Wambura Nyikal, who is its first member of parliament since the constituency was created in 2012.
