= National Development Party (Kenya) =

- Leader: Raila Odinga
- Founder: Stephen Omondi Oludhe
- Founded: 1991
- Dissolved: 2002

The National Development Party (NDP) was a political party in Kenya which was of national importance between 1994 and 2001. It was founded by Stephen Wilfred Omondi Oludhe.

== Becoming Odinga's party ==
Being a minor political party, until 1994, the NDP gained national prominence when Raila Odinga joined it after he left Ford-Kenya following his loss in the battle for leadership of that party to Michael Wamalwa. Odinga pulled Ford members of parliament from Nyanza Province with him. This spike in membership, which included Ford-K's Nyanza MPs, put the NDP in the position of a major opposition party in the Kenyan parliament. The party managed to retain its strong position in the Nyanza region, mainly among the Luo population, during the 1997 elections when it returned 21 members to parliament.

== Co-operation and coalition with KANU ==
In 2000, the NDP started cooperating with the KANU-government of President Daniel arap Moi. From June 2001, three MPs of the NDP joined the cabinet, thus inaugurating the first coalition cabinet in Kenya's history.

== 2002 merger and split ==
In spring 2002, the NDP merged with KANU. NDP leader Odinga became the Secretary-General of the United Party. This union was to be short-lived, as from summer 2002 it became obvious that arap Moi was determined to have Uhuru Kenyatta as his successor, which a KANU congress confirmed in October 2002. Odinga, who had been aware of manipulated lists of delegates, pulled out from the congress with his followers from the former NDP and was joined by several KANU politicians who protested against Moi's manipulation of the party meeting in favour of his chosen candidate. Together, the group, which called itself the Rainbow Coalition, quit the ruling party and then joined the then-minor Liberal Democratic Party, which was to be one of the founding members of the National Rainbow Coalition, which went on to win the 2002 presidential and parliamentary elections.
