= Jaramogi Oginga Odinga University of Science and Technology =

Public university in Bondo, Kenya

Coordinates: 00°05′38″S 34°15′31″E

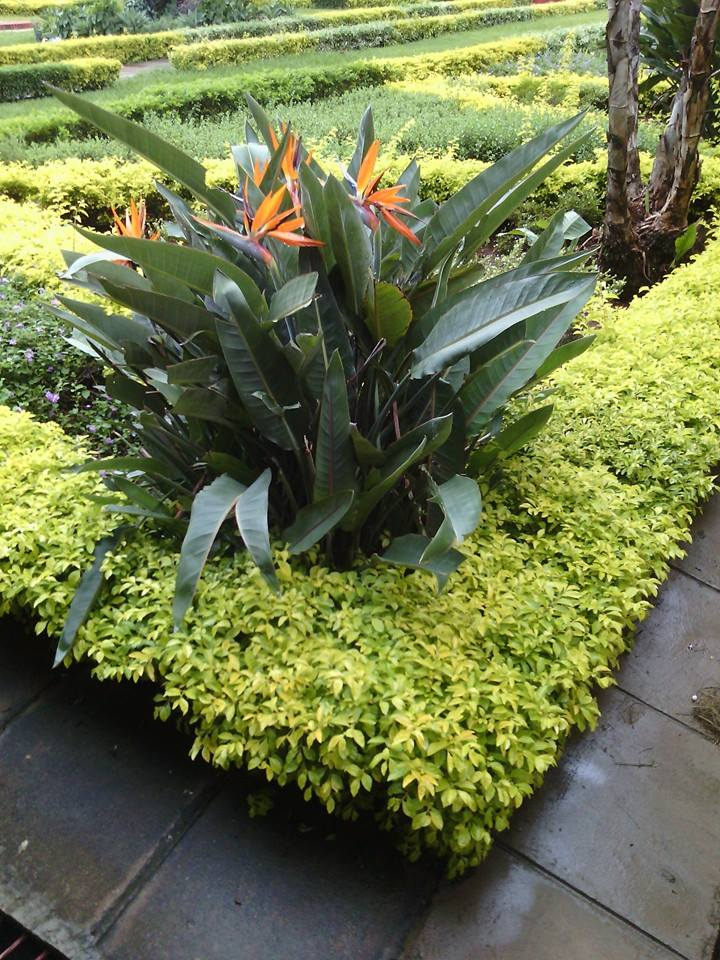
- A corner of a flower pod in Jaramogi Oginga Odinga University of Science and Technology in Bondo, Kenya.
- Former name: Bondo Teachers College
- Established: 11 May 2009; 17 years ago, as Bondo University College
- Vice-Chancellor: Prof. Emily Achieng Akuno
- Location: Bondo, Siaya County, Kenya
- Website: www.jooust.ac.ke

Jaramogi Oginga Odinga University of Science and Technology (JOOUST) is a public university in Bondo in Siaya County, Kenya. It is named after Kenya's first vice-president Jaramogi Oginga Odinga.

Prof. Emily Achieng Akuno, has been the Vice Chancellor of JOOUST since August 2023 when Prof. Stephen G. Agong's term elapsed.

== Location ==
It is located in the town of Bondo, in Siaya County in the western part of Kenya, approximately 62 kilometres (39 mi), by road, west of the city of Kisumu. The geographical coordinates of the university's main campus are 0°05'38.0"S, 34°15'31.0"E (Latitude:-0.093889; Longitude:34.258611).

== Overview ==
JOOUST was founded in 2009, through a Legal Order, as Bondo University College, a constituent college of Maseno University. The land it currently sits on was originally held by the Bondo Teachers College since 1990, until it was relocated to a new location within the same locality. In 2013, the law was repealed and the university received its own charter as an independent institution of higher education.

== Academics ==
As of February 2019, the university maintained the following academic units:

Schools

- School of Agricultural and Food Sciences
- School of Biological & Physical Sciences
- School of Business & Economics
- School of Education
- School of Engineering and Technology
- School of Health Sciences
- School of Humanities & Social Sciences
- School of Informatics & Innovative Systems
- School of Mathematics and Actuarial Sciences
- School of Spatial Planning and Natural Resource Management

Institutes

- Institute of Cultural Heritage and Material Science
- East African Community Integration Institute

Centres

- Centre for Research Innovation and Technology
- Centre for Gender Mainstreaming and Development
- Centre for Outreach and Extension Services
- Centre for E-Learning
- Africa Centre of Excellence in Sustainable Use of Insects as Food and Feeds (INSEFOODS).

== Future plans ==
In February 2019, the Business Daily Africa reported that JOOUST in partnership with Siaya County Administration planned to establish a set up a constituent college named after former US president Barack Obama. The institution will focus on research in fisheries, agriculture and promote extension services for local farmers.
