= Jack Ranguma =

Kenyan politician

1st Governor of Kisumu County
- In office 27 March 2013 – 21 August 2017
- Deputy: Ruth Odinga
- Preceded by: Position established
- Succeeded by: Anyang' Nyong'o

Personal details
- Born: 20 October 1954 (age 71) Kano, Central Nyanza District, Kenya
- Party: ODM
- Spouse: Olivia Ranguma (m. 1980)
- Children: Eugene Ranguma (deceased); Sonya Ranguma (deceased); Tanya Ranguma
- Education: University of Illinois at Urbana-Champaign Master of Science (International Accounting and Management Information Systems)
- Profession: Accountant

Jack Nyanungo Ranguma, also known as JR, is a Kenyan politician and was the first Governor of Kisumu County, Kenya. He was elected on 6 March 2013.

== History ==
=== Educational background ===
Jack Ranguma has a Master of Science (International Accounting and Management Information Systems) from the University of Illinois at Urbana-Champaign.

=== Professional career ===
Prior to entering politics Jack Ranguma had worked as an accountant for close to 30 years. In 1979, Jack Ranguma was appointed Audit Manager in charge of a large quasi-government audit portfolio by BDO International. He was promoted to Partner in charge of audit services in 1989, and served as Partner and Head of Financial and Management Consultancy Services between 1991-2001. In 2002 he was appointed Commissioner of Income Tax, and later Commissioner of Domestic Taxes, Kenya Revenue Authority. In 2008 he became Senior Policy Advisor for Tax Justice Network Africa, a pan-African organization.
