= Nyawita =

- Location within Kenya
- Coordinates: 0.68°S 34.42°E
- Country: Kenya
- Province: Nyanza Province
- Time zone: UTC+3 (EAT)

Nyawi is a settlement in Kenya's Nyanza Province. It is located within Kisumu District, Winam Division. Nyawita is a sub-location that was once famous for being an economic hub for traders in the region; an activity that has since declined owing to many factors such as lack of a well established public transportation system to and from the settlement, among others. It now remains mainly a residential area with scattered shopping kiosks which its residents depend on daily.
