= Kisumu County =

Coordinates: 0°15′S 34°55′E

Kisumu County Kisumu
- County
- Kisumu
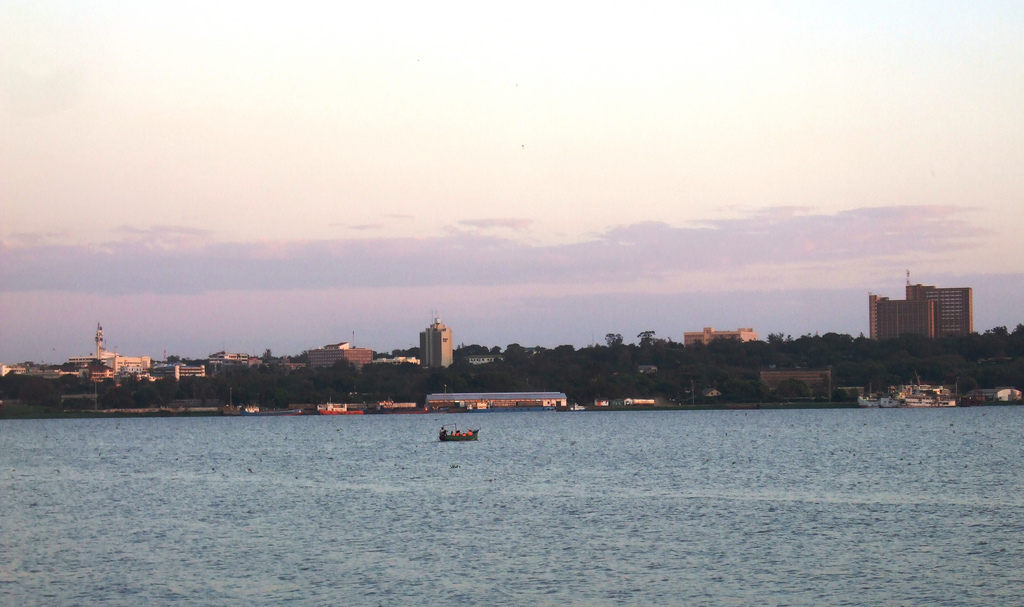
- The skyline of Kisumu City from Lake Victoria

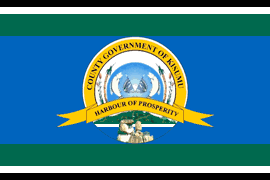
- Flag
- Nickname: Kisumu
- Motto: Harbour of prosperity
- Location in Kenya
- Coordinates: 0.091702,34.767956
- Country: Kenya
- Established: 4 March 2013
- Capital: Kisumu
- Sub-counties: List (Note: Sub-counties are different from Constituencies. In most cases they share common boundaries with constituencies. In this case Nyando Constituency has two sub-counties, Nyando and Kadibo): Kadibo; Kisumu Central; Kisumu East; Kisumu West; Muhoroni; Nyakach; Nyando; Seme

Government
  - Type: County Government
  - Governor: Anyang' Nyong'o
  - Deputy Governor: Mathews Owili
  - Senator: Prof Tom Ojienda
  - Woman Representative: Dr Ruth Odinga: Majority Leader Gilbert Njoga

Area
  - Total: 2,085.9 km^{2} (805.4 sq mi)
- Elevation: 1,131.00000 m (3,710.62992 ft)

Population (2019)
  - Total: 1,155,574
  - Density: 553.99/km^{2} (1,434.8/sq mi)
- Time zone: UTC+3 (EAT)
- city: 40100
- Area code: 057
- GDP PPP (2024): $6.9472 billion USD
- GDP (2024): $2.672 billion USD
- Website: kisumu.go.ke

Kisumu County is one of 47 counties in the Republic of Kenya. Its borders follow those of the original Kisumu District, one of the former administrative districts of the former Nyanza Province in western Kenya. Its headquarters is Kisumu City which is the third largest city in Kenya after the capital Nairobi and the coastal city of Mombasa. It has a population of 1,155,574 (according to the 2019 National Census). The land area of Kisumu County totals 2085.9 km^{2}.

Kisumu County's neighbours are Siaya County to the West, Vihiga County to the North, Nandi County to the North East and Kericho County to the East. Its neighbour to the South is Nyamira County and Homa Bay County is to the South West. The county has a shoreline on Lake Victoria, occupying northern, western and a part of the southern shores of the Winam Gulf.

== Etymology ==
The name Kisumu comes from the Luo word "Kisuma"Kikelo. Generally, Kisuma means "a place where people meet to exchange goods" but it does not necessarily mean the same word as "market" (chiro in Luo). The term was especially used during famine where a person could "visit" relatives who had some sort of harvest where the "visitor", when going back to his/her place, could be "escorted with" or given some grains and dried meat (aliya in Luo). The word originally comes from the verb "sumo", which means "getting material want through exchange" or as an assistance when one has minimal ability. It should be differentiated from 'fulo' where one rummages through the farm of someone else after the harvest to pick dropped or omitted crops to collect and take home for consumption". When Europeans and Indians came to the area of the present-day city of Kisumu, pronouncing the name "Kisuma" correctly proved difficult, and the name evolved into the current Kisumu. The local people however, now popularly call the place "Kisumo".

== Geography ==
Kisumu County is located in western Kenya, far from the nation’s capital. (To the southwest, in neighboring Siaya County, lies the village of Nyang’oma Kogelo, birthplace of Barack Obama Sr.) The city of Kisumu, on the shores of Lake Victoria, has historically functioned as a major center of Western Kenya commerce. Because of its location along Africa’s largest lake, the area is ideally situated for fishing and fish processing, but the central government has long controlled key concessions on the lake, and economic development has left many of the inhabitants behind. Fishing, sugarcane farming, and rice farming are the county’s principal industries.

== Climate ==
The climate of the whole county is modified by the presence of Lake Victoria. The county has an annual relief rainfall that ranges between 1200 mm and 1300 mm in different sectors. The rain mainly falls in two seasons. Kisumu is known for its thunderstorms, which are the major type of precipitation and normally occur in mid-afternoon during the rainy season.

The temperature of the surrounding towns and regions can vary greatly. On the western side, which includes the constituencies of Kisumu West and Seme, temperatures tend to be cooler than the adjacent lake basin. Maseno Division and Nyahera division are known for moderate weather conditions. On the Eastern side, Nyabondo plateau is cooler than the neighboring Kano Plains.

Kisumu is warm throughout the year with a mean annual temperature of 23.0°C. The temperature ranges between 20.0°C and 35.0°C but seldom falls below 19.0°C. The humidity is relatively high throughout the year.

== Political leadership ==
The second and current Governor of Kisumu County is Anyang' Nyong'o, and the Deputy Governor is Dr. Mathews Owili. Before the election of Prof. Nyong'o and Dr. Owili in August 2017, the first Governor from 2013 to 2017 was Mr. Jack Ranguma whose Deputy was Ms. Ruth Odinga. Fredrick Otieno Outa was the second senator after the first Senator Anyang' Nyong'o ran for governor in 2017. Rozaah Akinyi Buyu was the women representative and joined office in 2017, and was the second women representative after winning against first women representative, Rose Nyamunga.

The legislature of the county is called the County Assembly and has 35 representatives.

== Administrative and political units ==
Administratively, the county is divided into 7 constituencies which share common boundaries and names with 7 of the 8 sub-counties, the eighth Kadibo sub-county was created by President Uhuru Kenyatta's administration and was gazetted on 29 October 2021, with the headquarters of the sub-county to be at Rabuor. It was split from Nyando Sub-county The sub-counties are further divided into 35 wards, which also forward representatives to the County Assembly in Kisumu City.

| Constituency | Population* | Area (km^{2}) | Sub-county |
|---|---|---|---|
| Kisumu East | 229,997 | 135.90 | Kisumu East |
| Kisumu West | 172,821 | 212.90 | Kisumu West |
| Kisumu Central | 174,145 | 32.70 | Kisumu West |
| Muhoroni | 154,116 | 667.30 | Muhoroni |
| Nyakach | 150,320 | 357.30 | Nyakach |
| Nyando | 161,508 | 413.20 | Nyando & Kadibo |
| Seme | 121,667 | 190.20 | Seme |

== Economy ==
The county is part of the Lake Region Economic Bloc (LREB) established in 2018 to foster regional economic, industrial, social, and technological collaboration.

=== Fishing ===
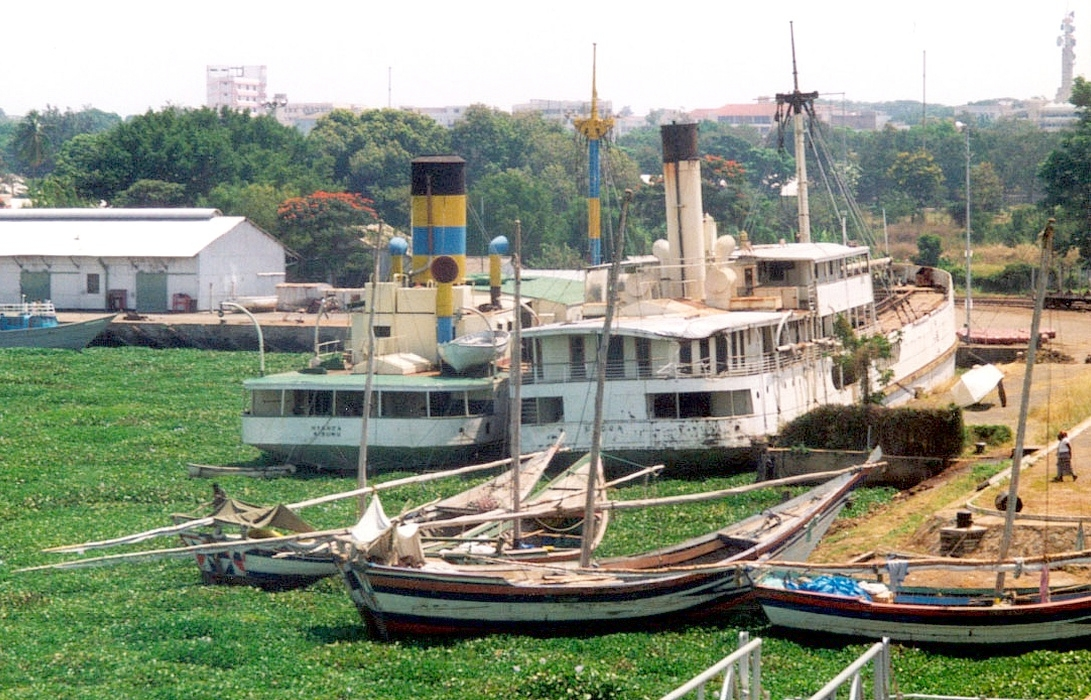
The water hyacinth that chokes Lake Victoria

Kisumu County sits on the shores of Lake Victoria, providing it with the potential to be a major centre of fishing. However, the use of old technologies hampers the full development of the industry. Also, the recent water hyacinth menace on the lake has reduced fish catches significantly. The new county government has provided equipment which currently rolling out the floating hyacinth on the surface of the lake. This has led to an increase in the movements of the transportation vessels including waterbuses and ships.

=== Agriculture ===
Rice is grown under irrigation in the Kano Plains. Most of the water for irrigation comes from River Nyando, whose annual floods displace huge numbers of people but also deposit a lot of fertile silt all across the plain. The northern and eastern fringes of the Kano Plains also play host to some of Kenya's most productive sugarcane fields. Towns like Kibos, Miwani and Chemelil are centres of sugarcane production. Kisumu County also produces maize, beans, sweet potatoes, poultry and fresh vegetables.

=== Industry ===
Kisumu city and the surrounding areas have several light industries. These include textiles, molasses, fish processing plants and agricultural produce processors. Kisumu has 4 sugar factories, at Chemelil, Muhoroni, Kibos and Miwani. However, the mill at Miwani is not operational after its original owners abandoned it in the year 1988. Also present in the main industrial area is a large scale maize milling company. Several backyard industries also thrive in the county, including tailoring, making of handicrafts and boatbuilding.

=== Services ===
Kisumu city is the major commercial centre in Western Kenya. Service industries like wholesale & retail trade, bicycle repair, car repair, entertainment centres and low scale IT services abound within and outside the city. Several banks have their regional offices in the city, servicing the entire western Kenya region.

=== Transport and Communications ===
==== Transport ====
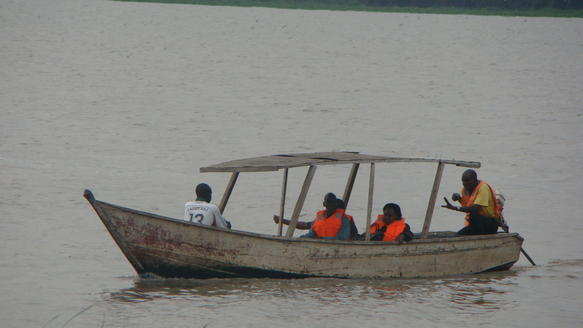
Water transport on Lake Victoria

Kisumu county has several paved roads, the major one being the Nairobi-Bondo road, which has a branch at Kisian heading to Busia. Important roads are paved with asphalt. County roads are mostly murram but provide all weather movement all year. Public transport services are provided by matatus and buses either operating singly or as parts of franchises and companies. Bicycle and motorcycle boda-bodas also exist in significant quantities for short-distance travel. From Kisumu County’s road department, the county is determined towards advancing its transportation by spending sh600 million in renovating old roads and building new ones within 2018 to 2019 financial year.

The city of Kisumu was founded as a terminal for the railway, and therefore has an important railway station. The narrow gauge railway moves both passengers and cargo, linking Kisumu with other cities and towns along the line. The new national government has pledged to build a new modern metro network for the city.

Water transport on the lake is provided mostly by private operators in wooden boats with outboard engines, although a ferry service exists. The services connect towns on the shores and also help in crossing the lake. They also link the county with the other three lakeside counties and the countries of Tanzania and Uganda. The port of Kisumu is very inactive at the moment but has the potential to become a regional centre of lake transport and a gateway for Kenya into the rest of the African Great Lakes region.

Kisumu International Airport has been upgraded and now has the potential to be an entreport for the entire region. Schedule flights land from Nairobi, Mombasa and several cities in neighbouring countries.

==== Communications ====
Mobile phone penetration is high, and the coverage by the major service providers (Safaricom, Airtel, and Telkom is basically reliable. The post offices in the county still function. Courier services also exist, providing quick ways of sending parcels and letters outside the county.

=== Tourism ===
Kisumu County is fast developing into a major tourist destination in the Western Tourism Circuit of Kenya. Replete with great scenery and diversity concentrated within a relatively small area, Kisumu County's tourism sector is expected to experience a major boom.

Features like the shoreline of Lake Victoria, Kit Mikayi and other rocks of similar stature, Ndere Island National Park (which hosts an amazing variety of wildlife within a confined area), the God Mesa viewpoint in Nyabondo (from which one has a panoramic view of the Nyando Plains and Lake Victoria in the distance, and the inselbergs around the Kisian area provide an attraction for tourists. The Kisumu Museum and the Impala Park provides further tourist attractions. Kisumu is touted to have one of the best sunsets in the world,with the sun sinking into the horizon over the lake turning the water into many hues, a spectacle that continues to drive up tourist numbers into the county.

The Kisumu International Airport now has the potential to deliver international tourists directly into the county, and it is expected that this will be a major boon for the industry in the county. Tourist infrastructure, like hotels and lodges, are now springing up in many places.

== Education ==
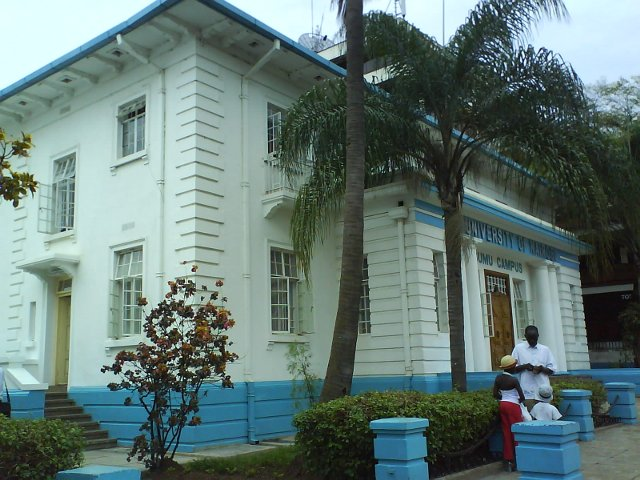
The Kisumu Campus of the University of Nairobi

Maseno University is the crown jewel of higher education in Kisumu county. The university attracts students from all over Kenya who are attracted to the institution due to its excellent infrastructure and lush green environs.

Kisumu County has several colleges and universities, including a campus of Kenya's largest university, the University of Nairobi. Other universities include Maseno University (best known for its IT department), Great Lakes University and several teaching and nursing colleges. Primary and secondary education is provided by 706 primary schools and 173 public secondary schools, including two of the oldest secondary schools in Kenya; Maseno School . A substantial number of private institutions also exist within the county.

The enrolment in primary school and secondary school stood at 240, 538 and 38, 815 as of 2009. The teacher to pupil ratio was 1:51 for primary and 1:30 for secondary. Kisumu Polytechnic provides several technical courses for young adults and also professionals, including some diploma courses. 5 youth polytechnics also exist in various parts of the county.

== Health ==
Health in Kisumu County is provided by several institutions that are either private or government funded. There is one teaching and referral hospital, 5 County referral hospital, 14 sub-county hospitals, 74 dispensaries and 18 health centres in the county. The naming system has been changed due to the fact that the system of government has changed and Kenya is now operating a devolved system of government. The county government shall now fully responsible for health service delivery to residents in the county through health facilities and pharmacies as enshrined in Schedule 4 of the Constitution of Kenya (2010). The infant mortality Rates for Kisumu County is relatively high, at 95/1000. The under five mortality rates for the county are 149/1000. The maternal mortality has been estimated to be 590 per 100,000 live births.

The location of Kisumu County puts it in major breeding ground for mosquitos, and malaria has been a perennial problem since time immemorial. Another health problem that majorly affects the county is the relatively high rates of HIV infection. But the rate has stabilised at 19.0%. Key health facilities in the county are Jaramogi Oginga Odinga Teaching and Referral Hospital (popularly known as Russia since it was built by the Soviets), the Kisumu County Referral Hospital and the Aga Khan Hospital Kisumu. All facilities are located in Kisumu City. There are two CDC funded centres in Kisumu, one in Kisian and the other in Kombewa. They engage in research in several diseases which affect the local communities, including HIV and malaria.

== People ==
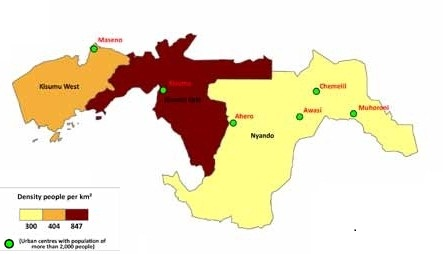
Population Density in Kisumu County

Kisumu County is relatively densely populated compared with the rest of Kenya. The 2009 census showed that the county had a population of 968,909. With an area of 2,085.9 km2, Kisumu County has a population density of 460 per square kilometres, comparable to that of the entire South Korea. The vast majority of the people belong to the Luo ethnic community, the third largest tribe in Kenya and one of the largest in East Africa. There are also small numbers of minorities from the other ethnic communities of Kenya, predominantly the Luhya. Indians came with the railway construction, and now form a substantial Indian community in Kisumu city. The dominant language is Dholuo, but Kiswahili and English are also spoken by a majority of the population for non-domestic purposes.

The people of Kisumu eat a lot of fish prepared in a variety of ways. This high consumption has sometimes been touted as one of the causes of the generally higher IQ levels in the region, and the eating of fish has become popular all over Kenya as a result. This is usually accompanied by ugali, a dish made of maize flour which can also be mixed with other grains, mostly millet, sorghum and/or cassava. Vegetables are also eaten.

In the 2019 census, the rural population of the county was estimated to be 714,668; With the city population estimated to be 397,957. The city comprises the majority of the urban residents in the county, whose total population was 1,155,574.

=== Religion ===
Religion in Kisumu County

| Religion (2019 Census) | Number | Percentage (%) |
|---|---|---|
| Catholicism | 224,352 | 19.14 |
| Protestant | 319,349 | 27.64 |
| Evangelical Churches | 291,233 | 25.20 |
| African instituted Churches | 208,708 | 18.06 |
| Orthodox | 10,630 | 0.92 |
| Other Cristian | 43,791 | 3.79 |
| Islam | 17,241 | 1.49 |
| Hindu | 2,375 | 0.21 |
| Traditionists | 3,619 | 0.31 |
| Other | 15,901 | 1.38 |
| No Religion/Atheists | 6,653 | 0.58 |
| Don't Know | 723 | 0.06 |
| Not Stated | 202 | 0.02 |

== Notable residents ==
- Robert Ouko from Nyahera was a notable foreign minister under the Moi government.
- First Kisumu County Governor Mr. Jack Ranguma
- Peter Anyang' Nyong'o, politician.

== Villages and settlements ==
- Assawa. Kanyakwar village
- Kajulu Hills
- Abwao-Kadiang'a Village
- Kogony village. Home of the Kisumu International Airport.
- Kadeya Village
- Kolwal Village
- Korando Village
- Karateng Village
- Kawino Village
- K'Ako Village
