= Elisabeth Tankeu =

Cameroonian politician

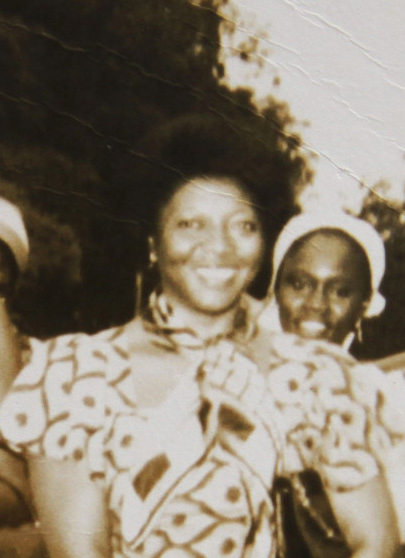

Deputy Director of Planning for Cameroon
- In office 1976–1979

Director of Planning
- In office 1980–1983

Deputy Minister for Planning of Industries
- In office 1983–1988

Minister for Planning and Regional Development
- In office 1988–1992

Personal details
- Born: 29 February 1944
- Died: 16 October 2011 (aged 67) Paris, France

Elisabeth Tankeu (29 February 1944 – 16 October 2011) was a Cameroonian politician. She was the African Union's Commissioner of Trade and Industry.

== Political career ==
From 1976 to 1979 Tankeu served as Deputy Director of Planning for Cameroon and from 1980 to 1983 she was Director of the same ministry. From 1983 to 1988 she was Deputy Minister for Planning of Industries and from 1988 to 1992 Minister for Planning and Regional Development.

== Personal life ==
Tankeu died on 16 October 2011 in a hospital in Paris, France. She was buried on 19 November 2011 in Bangoua, her husband's native town in West Cameroon.
