= Bar Kowino =

Barkowino
- Location within Kenya
- Coordinates: 0.12°S 34.27°E
- Country: Kenya
- Province: Nyanza Province
- Time zone: UTC+3 (EAT)

Barkowino is a settlement in Kenya, located at North Sakwa Ward, Siaya County.
