= Prime Minister of Kenya =

Head of government

- Coat of arms of Kenya
- Seat: Nairobi
- Formation: 1 June 1963; 17 April 2008
- First holder: Jomo Kenyatta
- Final holder: Raila Odinga
- Abolished: 12 December 1964; 9 April 2013

The prime minister of Kenya was a post in the Kenyan government. The first prime minister of Kenya was Jomo Kenyatta, who became prime minister in 1963. In 1964, when Kenya became a republic, the post of prime minister was abolished and Jomo Kenyatta became president. Following a power-sharing agreement in February 2008, the role was recreated in April 2008 and held by Raila Odinga. The position was again abolished by the 2010 Constitution after the 2013 elections.

The proposed 2021 constitutional referendum would have decided whether to constitutionally reestablish the office. The process of the proposed amendments to the constitution, was declared unconstitutional by the Supreme Court of Kenya On 31 March 2022. The court also barred the Independent Electoral and Boundaries Commission from proceeding with the referendum.

A similar office, that of Prime Cabinet Secretary, was established by Executive Order No. 1 of 2022 on 27 September 2022.

== History ==
On 1 June 1963, the Dominion of Kenya had her first prime minister. The head of state remained Queen Elizabeth II who was represented through a governor-general in Kenya. The governor-general could then select a prime minister from whichever political party had the majority in the House of Representatives; the prime minister would be head of government; Jomo Kenyatta was elected as the first prime minister of Kenya on 27 May 1963. The prime minister office was only effective up to 12 December 1964, before Kenya became a republic; Kenyatta became president.

Following the 2007–2008 Kenyan crisis, H.E. the late President Mwai Kibaki and Hon. Raila Odinga reached an agreement to form a coalition government on 28 February 2008. Kibaki was to remain the head of state, while Odinga would have a new role of prime minister. Both would appoint half the cabinet. Both leading coalitions produced a deputy prime minister: Musalia Mudavadi for ODM, and Uhuru Kenyatta for PNU. The prime minister office was reestablished through the National Accord and Reconciliation Act 2008.

The post was abolished in 2013 after the Constitution of Kenya was changed, which did not provide for the office of prime minister, making Kenya a purely presidential system.

Efforts have been initiated to reintroduce the office through constitutional amendment through the Building Bridges Initiative constitutional referendum attempt. On 31 March 2022, the Supreme Court of Kenya upheld the rulings of the lower courts, ruling that, "The Constitution Amendment Bill of 2020 is unconstitutional," because President Kenyatta [Uhuru] initiated the amendments through his creation of the Presidential Taskforce on Building Bridges to Unity Advisory, and vocal endorsement of the legislation crafted based on their findings.

== Prime ministers of Kenya (1963–1964; 2008–2013) ==
Political parties

Kenya African National Union (KANU)
Orange Democratic Movement (ODM)

No.	Picture	Name (Birth–Death)	Elected	Term of office			Political party
No.	Picture	Name (Birth–Death)	Elected	Took office	Left office	Time in office	Political party
Prime Minister of Kenya (1963–1964)
1		Jomo Kenyatta (1891–1978)	1963	1 June 1963	12 December 1964	1 year, 194 days	KANU
Prime Minister of Kenya (2008–2013)
2		Raila Odinga (1945–2025)	—	17 April 2008	9 April 2013	4 years, 357 days	ODM

== See also ==
- Politics of Kenya
- Prime Cabinet Secretary
- President of Kenya
- List of heads of state of Kenya
- Deputy President of Kenya
- List of colonial governors and administrators of Kenya
