= 9th Parliament of Kenya =

The 9th Parliament of the Republic of Kenya was opened by elected President Mwai Kibaki on February 18, 2003. It was the first time that the formerly-dominant Kenya African National Union of Daniel arap Moi was in the minority. The triumphant NARC (a coalition of the National Alliance Party of Kenya and Liberal Democratic Party), which dominated in the general elections of 2002 was in the majority, led by Kibaki.

However, after the 2005 constitutional referendum, Kibaki threw out the LDP members from his Cabinet, at which point the LDP left NARC and formed the Orange Democratic Movement-Kenya in coalition with Uhuru Kenyatta's KANU party. In 2007, KANU left the coalition and mostly joined with Kibaki's new Party of National Unity, although some of its members stayed with the ODM-Kenya. The original NARC, now headed by Charity Ngilu, allied itself with the ODM-Kenya, which also split into two parties, one ODM led by Raila Odinga and the other ODM-Kenya by Kalonzo Musyoka. The major contestants for the presidential elections were Mwai Kibaki of the PNU coalition, Raila Odinga of ODM and Kalonzo Musyoka of ODM-Kenya.

== Composition ==
The 9th Parliament was composed of the following members from these political parties below: NARC had 125, of whom 64 would later align themselves with PNU, whilst the 61 who did not (many of whom were elected as LDP MPs), would later align themselves with either ODM or ODM-Kenya. Ford-People had 14 elected legislators, with Safina, FORD-Asili, Sisi Kwa Sisi getting 2 members each. Finally the Shirikisho Party of Kenya had one member bringing the total to 209 members of Parliament.

== National Assembly members ==
=== Constituency members of parliament ===
Constituency	MP	Party
Makadara	Reuben Owino Nyangija Ndolo	NARC
Kamukunji	Norman M.G.K. Nyagah	NARC
Starehe	Maina Kamanda	NARC
Langata	Raila Amolo Odinga	NARC
Dagoretti	Beth Wambui Mugo	NARC
Westlands	Frederick Omulo Gumo	NARC
Kasarani	William Opondo Omondi	NARC
Embakasi	David S Kamau Mwenje	NARC
Changamwe	Seif Ramadhan Kajembe	NARC
Kisauni	Emmanuel Karisa Maitha	NARC
Likoni	Suleiman Rashid Shakomio	NARC
Mvita	Najib Mohamed Balala	NARC
Msambweni	Abdallah Jumaa Ngozi	NARC
Matuga	Chirau Ali Mwakwere	NARC
Kinango	Samuel Gonzi Rai	FORD-People
Bahari	Joseph Matano Khamisi	NARC
Kaloleni	Morris Mwachondo Dzoro	NARC
Ganze	Joseph Kahindi Kingi	NARC
Malindi	Lucas Baya Mweni Maitha	NARC
Magarini	Harrison Garama Kombe	Shirikisho
Garsen	Danson Buya Mungatana	NARC
Galole	Tola Kofa Mugava	KANU
Bura	Ali Wario	KANU
Lamu East	Abu Chiaba Mohamed	KANU
Lamu West	Fahim Yasin Twaha	KANU
Taveta	Naomi Namisi Shaban	KANU
Wundanyi	J D Mchanga Mwandawiro	FORD-People
Mwatate	Marsden Herman Madoka	KANU
Voi	Boniface Mganga	KANU
Dujis	Hussein Maalim Mohamed	KANU
Lagdera	Abdullah Sheikh Dahir	KANU
Fafi	Aden Sugow Ahmed	KANU
Ijara	Mohamed Yussuf Haji	KANU
Wajir North	Abdullah Ibrahim Ali	KANU
Wajir West	Ahmad Mohamed Khalif	NARC
Wajir East	Abdi Mahamud Mohamed	KANU
Wajir South	Ali Hassan Abdirahman	KANU
Mandera West	Mohamed Abdi Haji Mohamed	KANU
Mandera Central	Adan Kerow Billow	KANU
Mandera East	Shaaran Ali Isaack	KANU
Moyale	Gurrach Boru Galgallo	KANU
North Horr	Bonaya Adhi Godana	KANU
Saku	Abdi Tari Sasura	KANU
Laisamis	Titus Lemusei Ngoyoni	KANU
Isiolo North	Mohamed Abdi Kuti	KANU
Isiolo South	Abdul Bahari Ali	KANU
Igembe	Raphael Muriungi	NARC
Ntonyiri	Richard Maore Maoka	KANU
Tigania West	Valerian Kilemi Mwiria	NARC
Tigania East	Peter Gatirau Munya	Safina
North Imenti	Daudi Mwiraria	NARC
Central Imenti	Kirugi Laiboni M'Mukindia	NARC
South Imenti	Kiraiti Murungi	NARC
Nithi	Petkay Shen Munkiria Miriti	NARC
Tharaka	Francis Nyamu Kagwima	FORD-Asili
Manyatta	Peter Njeru Ndwiga	NARC
Runyenjes	Martin Nyaga Wambora	NARC
Gachoka	Joseph William Nthiga Nyagah	NARC
Siakago	Justin Bedan Njoka Muturi	NARC
Mwingi North	Stephen Kalonzo Musyoka	NARC
Mwingi South	David Musila	NARC
Kitui West	Winfred Nyiva Mwendwa	NARC
Kitui Central	Charity Kaluki Ngilu	NARC
Mutito	Julius Kiema Kilonzo	FORD-People
Kitui South	Patrice Ezekiel Mwangu Ivuti	FORD-Asili
Masinga	Benson Itwiku Mbai	NARC
Yatta	James Philip Mutiso	NARC
Kangundo	Moffat Muia Maitha	Sisi Kwa Sisi
Kathiani	Peter Kyalo Kaindi	NARC
Machakos Town	Fredrick Mwanzia Daudi	NARC
Mwala	John Mutua Katuku	NARC
Mbooni	Joseph Konzollo Munyao	NARC
Kilome	John Mutinda Mutiso	NARC
Kaiti	Gideon Musyoka Ndambuki	KANU
Makueni	Kivutha Kibwana	NARC
Kibwezi	Richard Kalembe Ndile	NARC
Kinangop	Mwangi K Waithaka	NARC
Kipipiri	Amos Muhinga Kimunya	NARC
Ol Kalou	Karue Muriuki Muriuki	NARC
Ndaragwa	Goeffrey Gachara Muchiri	NARC
Tetu	Wangari Muta Maathai	NARC
Kieni	Christopher Ndarathi Murungaru	NARC
Mathira	James Nderitu Gachagua	NARC
Othaya	Mwai Kibaki	NARC
Mukurweini	Mutahi Kagwe	NARC
Nyeri Town	Peter Gichohi Muriithi	NARC
Mwea	Alfred Mwangi Nderitu	NARC
Gichugu	Martha Wangari Karua	NARC
Ndia	Robinson Njeru Githae	NARC
Kerugoya/Kutus	Daniel Dickson Karaba	NARC
Kangema	John Njoroge Michuki	NARC
Mathioya	John Joseph Kamotho	NARC
Kiharu	Gitura Kembi	NARC
Kigumo	Onesmus Kihara Mwangi	NARC
Maragwa	Elias Peter Mbau	NARC
Kandara	Joshua Ngugi Toro	NARC
Gatanga	Peter Kenneth	NARC
Gatundu South	Uhuru Mugai Kenyatta	KANU
Gatundu North	Patrick Kariuki Mururi	KANU
Juja	William Kabogo Gitau	Sisi Kwa Sisi
Githunguri	Arthur Kinyanjui Magugu	KANU
Kiambaa	James Njenga Karume	KANU
Kabete	Paul Kibugi Muite	Safina
Limuru	Simon Kanyingi Kuria	KANU
Lari	James Viscount Kimathi	KANU
Turkana North	John Munyes Kiyong'a	NARC
Turkana Central	Ekwee David Ethuro	NARC
Turkana South	Francis Igwaton Achuka	KANU
Kacheliba	Samuel Losuron Poghisio	KANU
Kapenguria	Samuel Chumel Moroto	KANU
Sigor	Philip Ruto Rotino	KANU
Samburu West	Simeon Saimanga Lesirma	KANU
Samburu East	Prisa Sammy Leshore	KANU
Kwanza	Noah Mahalang'ang'a Wekesa	NARC
Saboti	Michael Christopher Wamalwa	NARC
Cherangany	Kipruto Rono Kirwa	NARC
Eldoret North	William Samoei Ruto	KANU
Eldoret East	Joseph Lagat Kipchumba	KANU
Eldoret South	David Kiptanui Koros	KANU
Marakwet East	Linah Jebb Kilimo	NARC
Marakwet West	David Kiprono Sutter Sudi	KANU
Keiyo North	Lucas Kipkosgei Chepkitony	KANU
Keiyo South	Kiprono N Kipyator Biwott	KANU
Mosop	John Kipkorir Sambu	KANU
Aldai	Jim Choge	KANU
Emgwen	Stephen Kipkiyeny Tarus	NARC
Tinderet	Henry Kiprono Kosgey	KANU
Baringo East	Asman Abongotum Kamama	FORD-People
Baringo North	Kiplumbei William Boit	KANU
Baringo Central	Gideon Kipsiele Towett Moi	KANU
Mogotio	Joseph Kipkapto Korir	KANU
Eldama Ravine	Musa Cherutich Sirma	KANU
Laikipia West	Godfrey Gitahi Kariuki	NARC
Laikipia East	Mwangi Festus Kiunjuri	NARC
Naivasha	Paul Samuel Kihara	NARC
Nakuru Town	Kimburi Kariuki	NARC
Kuresoi	Moses Kikemboi Cheboi	KANU
Molo	Macharia Mukiri	NARC
Rongai	Alicen Jematia Ronoh Chelaite	NARC
Subukia	Koigiwa Wamwere	NARC
Kilgoris	Gideon Sitelu Konchella	NARC
Narok North	William Rongora Ole Ntimama	NARC
Narok South	Stephen Kanyinke Ntutu	KANU
Kajiado North	George Saitoti	NARC
Kajiado Central	Joseph Kasaine Ole Nkaisserry	KANU
Kajiado South	Geoffrey Mepukori Parpai	NARC
Bomet	Nicholas Kiptoo Korir Salat	KANU
Chepalungu	John Kipsang arap Koech	KANU
Sotik	Anthony Kipkosge Kimeto	KANU
Konoin	Sammy Cheruiyot Koech	KANU
Bureti	Kipkorir Marisin Sang	KANU
Belgut	Charles Cheruiyot Keter	KANU
Ainamoi	Noah Nondin arap Too	KANU
Kipkelion	Sammy Kipkemoi Rutto	KANU
Malava	Peter Shitanda Soita	NARC
Lugari	Enoch Wamalwa Kibunguchy	NARC
Mumias	Wycliffe Osundwa	NARC
Matungu	David Aoko Were	NARC
Lurambi	Newton Wanjala Kulundu	NARC
Shinyalu	Daniel Lyula Khamasi	NARC
Ikolomani	Bonny Khalwale	NARC
Butere	Wycliffe Ambetsa Oparanya	NARC
Khwisero	Julius Odenyo Arungah	NARC
Emuhaya	Kenneth Otiato Marende	NARC
Saratia	Moses Epainitous Akaranga	NARC
Vihiga	Andrew Ndooli Ligale	NARC
Hamisi	George Khaniri Munyasa	NARC
Mt. Elgon	John Bomet Serut	KANU
Kimilili	Mukhisa Kituyi	NARC
Webuye	Musikari Nazi Kombo	NARC
Sirisia	Moses Masika Wetang'ula	NARC
Kanduyi	Athanas Misiko Wafula Wamunyinyi	NARC
Bumula	Sylvester Wakoli Bifwoli	NARC
Amagoro	Sospeter Odeke Ojaamongson	NARC
Nambale	Chrysanthus Okemo	KANU
Butula	Christine Abungu Mango	NARC
Funyula	Moody Arthur Awori	NARC
Budalangi	Raphael Bitta Sauti Wanjala	NARC
Ugenya	Stephen Oluoch Ondiek	NARC
Alego	Samuel Arthur Weya	NARC
Gem	Washington Jakoyo Midiwo	NARC
Bondo	Oburu Oginga	NARC
Rarieda	Raphael Tuju	NARC
Kisumu Town East	Eric Gor Sungu	NARC
Kisumu Town West	Joab Henry Omino Onyango	NARC
Kisumu Rural	Peter Anyang' Nyong'o	NARC
Nyando	Eric Opon Nyamunga	NARC
Muhoroni	Patrick Ayiecho Olweny	NARC
Nyakach	Peter Ochieng Odoyo	NARC
Kasipul Kabondo	Peter Otieno Owidi	NARC
Karachuonyo	Adhu Awiti	NARC
Rangwe	Philip Okoth Okundi	NARC
Ndhiwa	Joshua Orwa Ojodeh	NARC
Rongo	Ochilo George Mbogo Ayacko	NARC
Migori	Charles Oyugi Owino	NARC
Uriri	Herman Odhiambo Omamba	NARC
Nyatike	Tobias Orao Ochola Ogur	NARC
Mbita	Gerald Otieno Kajwan'g	NARC
Gwasi	Zaddock Madiri Syongoh	NARC
Kuria	Wilfred Gisuka Machage	NARC
Bonchari	John Zebedeo Opore	FORD-People
South Mugirango	James Omingo Magara	FORD-People
Bomachoge	Joel Omagwa Onyancha	FORD-People
Bobasi	Stephen Kengere Manoti	FORD-People
Nyaribari Masaba	Hezron Manduku	FORD-People
Nyaribari Chache	Simeon Nyachae	FORD-People
Kitutu Chache	Jimmy Nuru Ondieki Angwenyi	FORD-People
Kitutu Masaba	Samson M Nyangau Okioma	FORD-People
West Mugirango	Henry Onyancha Obwocha	FORD-People
North Mugirango Borabu	Godfrey Okeri Masanya	FORD-People

== Performance ==
Many Kenyans had a lot of expectations of changes to be effected by this parliament. In the inaugural speech President Mwai Kibaki, said that the 9th parliament heralded Kenya's long-awaited second liberation and promised their total commitment to tackle and eliminate corruption and ensure good governance.

The 9th Parliament has come under scrutiny and have been criticized for many failings. According to a report from Mars Group Kenya which is a type of watch dog to create awareness and accountability from Kenya's leadership, this parliament started by increasing their own remuneration and other allowances to become the most expensive parliament in the history of Kenya with an annual budget of over USD$57 million.

This parliament also failed to show leadership in the follow-up of the November 2005 Referendum on the Draft Constitution. They will go in history as the only parliament that never made any constitutional input in their 5 years tenure. A Constitution of Kenya Amendment Bill introduced in August 2007 by the Ministry of Justice and Constitutional Affairs Martha Karua didn't garner the necessary votes due to issues of women representation. This parliament also failed to look onto the issue of boundary review which had been recommended by the Electoral Commission of Kenya (ECK) to increase the representation with at least 40 new constituencies.

In 2007 they introduced a media bill which was looked upon as attempts to gag the media. They also attempted to reduce the powers of the Kenya Anti Corruption Commission (KACC). Their poor record of attendance was evident in the number of statutes that they were able to pass during their term. They passed 67 bills about 13 bills a year, a dismal record in comparison with what other parliaments achieve like the South African parliament which passes over 40 statutes a year. They were many issues pertaining to poor management of resources and funds under their control through the newly introduced CDF and failure in taking decisive action against illegal charges on the Consolidated Fund which involved fraudulent payments to phantom projects not undertaken like the Anglo Leasing and the Ken Ren Fertilizer project.

However the 9th parliament passed some relevant and good bills such as the establishment of Constituency Development Fund (CDF) and its increment in funding, Sexual offences bill moved by Njoki Ndungu, privatization authority, the insurance regulatory authority, and number of funding and regulating authorities just to mention a few.

The 9th Parliament was dissolved on October 22, 2007 in order to prepare for the parliamentary and presidential elections that year. It was succeeded by the 10th Kenyan Parliament in January 2008.

== See also ==
- Politics of Kenya
- Elections in Kenya
- List of political parties in Kenya
