= George Kegoro =

Kenyan lawyer

George Mong'are Kegoro is a Kenyan lawyer and the executive director of the Open Society Initiative for Eastern Africa (OSIEA), an arm of the Open Society Foundations (OSF). Prior to that he was the director of the Kenya Human Rights Commission.

== Education ==
Kegoro is an alumnus of Alliance High School. He has a Bachelor of Laws degree from the University of Nairobi School of Law and a Master of Arts in International Conflict Management from the same institution. Kegoro is an Advocate of the High Court of Kenya.

== Career ==
Kegoro was a State Counsel in the Office of the Attorney General of the Republic of Kenya where he was responsible for legal research for the purposes of law reform. Kegoro was Chief Executive of the Law Society of Kenya from 1998 to 2006. He is the immediate former Executive Director of the Kenya Section of the International Commission of Jurists and has previously been the Secretary to the Commission of Inquiry on the Post Election Violence (the Waki Commission) and was Joint Secretary to the Commission of Inquiry into the Goldenberg Scandal. In January 2007 George Kegoro was appointed as the new Executive Director of Kenyan section in International Commission of Jurists ICJ.
