= Likoni Constituency =

Kenyan electoral constituency

Likoni
- constituency for the Parliament of Kenya
- Likoni Constituency within Mombasa County

- Mombasa County within Kenya
- County: Mombasa
- Population: 250,358
- Area: 40 km^{2} (15.4 sq mi)

Current constituency
- Number of members: 1
- Party: ODM
- Member of Parliament: Mishi Juma Khamisi Mboko
- Wards: 5

Likoni is an electoral constituency in Mombasa County. It is one of the six constituencies in the county. It has five electoral wards which include Timbwani which is the largest, Bofu, Mtongwe, Likoni and Shika Adabu.

The current Member of Parliament for Likoni is Mishi Juma Mboko who is a member of the ODM party.

== Members of Parliament ==
Elections	MP	Party	Notes
1988	Abdulkadir Abdalla Mwidau	KANU	One-party system
1992	Khalif Salim Mwavumo	Ford-Kenya	7th Parliament of Kenya
1997	Rashid Suleiman Shakombo	Shirikisho	8th Parliament of Kenya
2002	Rashid Suleiman Shakombo	NARC	9th Parliament of Kenya
2007	Mwalimu Masudi Mwahima	ODM	10th Parliament of Kenya
2013	Mwalimu Masudi Mwahima	CORD	11th Parliament of Kenya
2017	Mishi Juma Mboko	ODM	12th Parliament of Kenya
2022	Mishi Juma Mboko	ODM	13th Parliament of Kenya

== Locations and wards ==
Locations
Location	Population*
Ganjoni	24,176
Likoni	76,388
Mtongwe	27,251
Shika Adabu	18,437
Total	x
1999 census.

Wards
Ward	Registered Voters
Bofu	16,147
Ganjoni	14,805
Mtongwe	9,640
Shika Adabu	7,627
Total	48,219
*September 2005.
