= Masoud Mwahima =

Kenyan politician (1949–2020)

Mwalimu Masudi Mwahima.
- Born: 1 November 1949.
- Died: 25 August 2020.
- Occupation: Politician.

Mwalimu Masudi Mwahima (1 November 1949 – 25 August 2020) was a Kenyan politician. He belonged to the Orange Democratic Movement and was elected to represent the Likoni Constituency in the National Assembly of Kenya since the 2007 Kenyan parliamentary election.

== Biography ==
Mwahima was born on 1 November 1949 and grew up without attending school, receiving little formal education throughout his childhood. Despite this he learned English as well as Kiswahili, in which he was described by Kenya's Standard newspaper as having "legendary oratory skills".

Mwahima began his political life in 1987 when he was elected as a councillor in Kenya's port city of Mombasa, representing the ward of Shika Adabu in the Likoni area of the city. He went on to become deputy mayor of the council, and eventually mayor, a position he held from 1999 to 2002. In 1997 Mwahima became the chairman of the Likoni division of Kenya's then-ruling party, the Kenya African National Union (KANU). He was expelled from KANU in 2002 after pledging allegiance to Simeon Nyachae of the opposition Ford People party. He stood as a Ford People candidate for the Likoni Constituency of the Kenyan National Assembly in the 2002 Kenyan general election, but lost to Suleiman Shakombo of the National Rainbow Coalition.

Mwahima contested the same seat in the 2007 general election, this time representing the Orange Democratic Movement party led by Raila Odinga. He defeated Shakombo, who had been the Heritage Minister under President Mwai Kibai in the previous government, by a margin of 17,859 votes to 7,324. As a member of parliament (MP), he served as on the Local Authorities Committee, the Catering and Health Club Committee, and the Departmental Committee on Health. Early in his tenure he was involved in a row with Odinga, who by then had become prime minister in the coalition government. Odinga was seeking to appoint a non-Coast Province leader of the Kenya Ports Authority, a move which was opposed by Mwahima and the province's five other Coast MPs who felt that the role should be in the hands of a local. Relations between the six MPs and Odinga remained tense in subsequent years, and they appeared on the verge of leaving ODM and aligning with William Ruto and Uhuru Kenyatta, rivals of Odinga. They re-pledged their allegiance to ODM at a public reconciliation in 2011, however.

Mwahima retained his seat in the 2013 general election, polling a total of 18,258 votes. Shakombo, representing the United Republican Party was again his nearest challenger, with 7,009 votes, closely followed by Bernard Odhiambo Waore of The Independent Party.

Mwahima died on 25 August 2020 at his home in Likoni. His family gave complications as a result of asthma as the reason for his death.
