= Adhu Awiti =

Kenyan politician

Peter Adhu Awiti

Member of the National Assembly for Karachuonyo Constituency
- In office 1997–2007
- Preceded by: Phoebe Asiyo
- Succeeded by: James Kwanya Rege

Minister for Planning
- In office 2001–2002
- President: Daniel arap Moi

Personal details
- Died: Kisumu, Kenya
- Party: National Development Party (NDP); National Rainbow Coalition (NARC)
- Profession: Politician
- Known for: Serving as Minister for Planning (2001–2002)

Peter Adhu Awiti (died 15 July 2014) was a Kenyan politician who served as a member of the National Assembly for Karachuonyo Constituency from 1997 until 2007.

== Career ==
He also served in former President Daniel arap Moi's final government cabinet as Minister for Planning from 2001 until 2002.

Awiti was first elected to Parliament for Karachuonyo in 1997 as a candidate for the National Development Party (NDP), defeating incumbent MP Phoebe Asiyo in the 1997 election.

In 2001, Awiti was appointed Minister for Planning following the merger of President Daniel arap Moi's Kenya African National Union (KANU) with Raila Odinga's National Development Party. However, Awiti and several other ministers resigned from the cabinet in 2002 after Odinga's supporters public disagreed with Moi over his choice of a candidate in the 2002 general election.

Awiti won re-election to the National Assembly in 2002, this time as a candidate for the National Rainbow Coalition. Five years later, Awiti lost his seat in 2007 election to James Kwanya Rege.

== Death ==
Adhu Awiti died from cancer on the afternoon of Tuesday 15 July 2014, at Avenue Hospital in Kisumu, Kenya.
