= Sabaki =

Sabaki may refer to:

- Sabaki River, or Athi-Galana-Sabaki River, a river in Kenya
- Sabaki languages, languages of the Swahili Coast, named for the Sabaki River
- Sabaki (Go), a term in the board game Go
- Sabaki (shogi), a term in the board game shogi
- Tai sabaki, a term from Japanese martial arts
- Sabaki, an electoral ward in Magarini Constituency, Kilifi County, Kenya
