= Bonchari Constituency =

Kenyan electoral constituency

Bonchari
- constituency for the Parliament of Kenya
- County: Kisii County

Current constituency
- Created: 1988
- Number of members: One
- Party: UPA
- Member of Parliament: Charles Onchoke
- Created from: Wanjare-South Mugirango

Bonchari is an electoral constituency in Kisii County. It is one of nine constituencies in the county. The constituency was established for the 1988 elections. It has four wards namely; Riana, Bomorenda, Bomariba and Bogiakumu.

== Members of Parliament ==
Elections	Member of Parliament	Party	Notes
1988	Protas Kebati Momanyi	KANU	One-party system.
1992	Protas Kebati Momanyi	KANU	
1997	Zebedeo John Opore	KANU	
2002	Zebedeo John Opore	Ford-People	
2007	Charles Onyancha	ODM	
2013	Zebedeo John Opore	Ford-people	
2017	John Oroo Oyioka	ODM	Died in 2021
2021	Pavel Oimeke	ODM	By-election
2022	Charles Onchoke	UPA	

== Wards ==
Bonchari Constituency has four wards represented by Members of county assembly in the Kisii County government. The wards are: Bogiakumu, Bomariba, Bokeira (Bomorenda) and Riana.

== Kisii South Sub-county ==
Kisii South Sub-county shares common boundaries with Bonchari. The sub-county is headed by the Deputy County Commissioner under the Ministry of Interior and National Government.
