= Mwalimu =

Mwalimu can refer to:

- Swahili for a teacher

- Mwalimu, the epithet of Tanzanian politician Julius Nyerere (1922–1999)

- Mwalimu (name)

== See also ==
- Mwalimu Commercial Bank, Tanzanian bank
- Mwalimu Cooperative Savings and Credit Society Limited, Kenyan savings bank
