= Richard Mabala =

British-born Tanzanian author

- Born: 11 December 1949 (age 76); London, United Kingdom
- Education: B.A (Hons) French and History (1971), M.A Oxford University (1983); Post Graduate Diploma in Education (1972) University of Nottingham, UK
- Occupations: Author social activist professor Columnist
- Writing career
- Language: English; Swahili; French
- Notable works: Hawa The Bus Driver; Mabala The Farmer
- Notable awards: CODE's Burt Award for African Literature

Richard Frank Satterthwaite (born 11 December 1949), popularly known as Richard Mabala, is a British-born Tanzanian author, social activist, columnist and academic, predominantly recognized for his tale books Hawa The Bus Driver, Mabala The Farmer and Run Free which won him a CODE's Burt Award for African Literature.

== Biography ==
Mabala was born in the United Kingdom. He moved to Tanzania in 1973 as a volunteer with the Voluntary Service Overseas. He was one of the first five British volunteers to be allowed into the country after Tanzania broke off diplomatic relations with Britain over the independence of Zimbabwe and became a Tanzanian citizen in 1982 after giving up his passport to become an official Tanzanian. He also served as a professor at the university of Dar es Salaam.

Mabala is currently (as at April 2024) Tanzania Chairperson of the Asante Africa Foundation a non-profit organisation that works with youth in Tanzania, Uganda and Kenya.

== Literary works ==
=== Books ===
Year	Name	Publisher	ISBN
1989	Mabala The Farmer	Longman, Harlow	ISBN 978-05-82030-72-5
1988	Hawa The Bus Driver	Longman, Harlow	ISBN 978-05-82030-71-8
1991	Doto ni Yupi?	East African Publications	ISBN 978-99-76200-57-7
2013	Run Free	E & D Vision Publishing Limited	ISBN 978-99-87735-10-5
1996	Kwangu ni Wapi?	TNGP	ISBN 978-99-87600-10-6
1991	Sinza Gang	East African Publications	
1995	The Market Children	Longman, Harlow	ISBN 978-05-82098-68-8
2010	Kurwa na Doto	Muture	
2001	The Empty Compound	Maskew Miller Longman	ISBN 978-06-36047-34-1
2003	Daughter of a Lioness	Maskew Miller Longman	ISBN 978-06-36047-18-1
2004	Who is The Thief?	Maskew Miller Longman	ISBN 978-06-36062-83-2
1999	Choices	Maskew Miller Longman	ISBN 978-06-36047-26-6
2002	The Special gift with Nick Warren	Maskew Miller Longman	ISBN 978-06-36047-10-5
1999	A Media Guide for NGOs with Samwel Maffisi	AEASUN	
2004	Mimba, Mdomo wa Mamba		
1999	Adhabu ni Adabu?		
1980	summons: poems from Tanzania	Tanzania Publishing House	
1988	Anthology of East African Poetry by E.D Amateshe (5 poems)	Longman	ISBN 978-05-82895-22-5
2003	Si mimi mama	Mture Educational Publishers	ISBN 978-99-87695-04-1
1992	Hamu ya matamu	Eastern Africa Publications Limited	ISBN 9789-97-6200-56-0

=== Other literary works ===
- 2008: Youth and The Hood (Environment and Urbanization)
- 2012/2013: Sisi ni sisimizi, Musa si Mzigo and Soma Kabula Soma
- 2007: Makengeza (in Mwananchi) and Binti Hidaya (in Raia Mwema)

== Further notes ==
- "Richard Mabala - Academia.edu". independent.academia.edu.
- "Richard Mabala". African Writers Conference. Archived from the original on 2022-12-28.
- "Richard Mabala". International Institute for Environment and Development.
- "Richard Mabala". Vijana FM.
