= Gatuyaini =

Village

Coordinates: 0°33′S 36°56′E

Gatuyaini is a village in Othaya division of Nyeri County, Kenya. It is part of Othaya town council and Othaya Constituency. The village is home to Gatuyaini Primary School.

People from Gatuyaini include former president Mwai Kibaki (born 1931- died April 2022), who served from December 2002 until April 2013.
