= Kenyan Section of the International Commission of Jurists =

Kenyan NGO advocating for human rights

- Abbreviation: ICJ Kenya
- Formation: 1959
- Type: NGO
- Headquarters: Nairobi, Kenya
- Website: www.icj-kenya.org

The Kenyan Section of the International Commission of Jurists, also known as ICJ Kenya, is a Kenyan non-governmental organisation, a National Section of the International Commission of Jurists. It is composed of lawyers and works to promote human rights and the rule of law.

== Aims and values ==
ICJ Kenya states its vision as "to be a premier organisation promoting a just, free and equitable society". The organisation's mission is to protect human rights, democracy and the rule of law in Kenya and across Africa through the application of legal expertise and international best practices.

== History ==
ICJ Kenya was founded in 1959 and registered as a society in Kenya in 1974. It has been involved in the move for constitutional change since the early 1990s. In 1994, together with the Law Society of Kenya (LSK) and the Kenya Human Rights Commission (KHRC), it drafted a model constitution for Kenya, which added to the pressure on the government of Daniel arap Moi to enact a new Constitution. In 2000, ICJ Kenya published a report on ‘The State of Freedom of Information in Kenya’, followed by a campaign for a Freedom of Information Bill. Long-term campaigning for reform of the Kenyan judiciary resulted in 2003 in the resignation of many judges and magistrates suspected of corruption and incompetence. Commentators state that the organisation has "influenced judicial reform" and describe it as a "key knowledge repository" on the subject of judicial integrity.

In 2010 the organisation sought an arrest warrant for the president of Sudan, Omar al-Bashir. The arrest warrant was issued by the Kenyan High Court in November 2011 and led to a breakdown of diplomatic relations between the two countries.

In partnership with other civil society groups in the region, ICJ Kenya published a report on "Counterterrorism and Human Rights Abuses in Kenya and Uganda: The World Cup Bombing and Beyond" (2012) on the response to the 2010 bombings in Kampala, and instigated a court action against the Kenyan government in 2013 on behalf of victims of sexual violence following the 2007 general elections, alleging failure to protect them or investigate the crimes committed against them.

== Governance ==
ICJ Kenya is a National Section of the International Commission of Jurists whose headquarters is in Geneva.

ICJ Kenya is a non-governmental, non-partisan, not for profit making, membership organisation registered in Kenya.

Members of ICJ Kenya are drawn from the various divisions of the legal profession and share the organisation's beliefs and values. The members pursue the body's work through a permanent secretariat where a professional team of full-time lawyers is in charge of programmatic activities under the oversight of the elected council.

== Affiliations ==
ICJ Kenya is part of the World Organisation Against Torture (OMCT) SOS-Torture Network.

== See also ==
- List of non-governmental organisations in Kenya
