= Magarini Constituency =

Electoral district of Kenya

Magarini
- constituency for the Parliament of Kenya
- Magarini Constituency within Kilifi County

- Kilifi County within Kenya
- County: Kilifi
- Population: 191,610
- Area: 5,229 km^{2} (2,018.9 sq mi)

Current constituency
- Number of members: 1
- Party: ODM
- Member of Parliament: Harrison Garama Kombe
- Wards: 6

Magarini Constituency is an electoral constituency in Kilifi County, Kenya. It is one of seven constituencies in the county and was formerly one of two constituencies in the now-defunct Malindi District. The constituency has eight wards, all electing ward representatives for the Malindi County Assembly.

== Members of Parliament ==
Elections	MP	Party	Notes
1988	Jonathan Katana Ndzai	KANU	One-party system
1992	Jonathan Katana Ndzai	KANU	
1997	David Noti Kombe	KANU	
2002	Harrison Garama Kombe	Shirikisho	Kombe's win was nullified by the Malindi High Court on 6 March 2007.
2007	Harrison Garama Kombe	Shirikisho	by-election
2007	Amason Kingi Jeffah	ODM	
2013	Harrison Garama Kombe	URP	
2017	Kingi Michael Thoyah	ODM	
2022	Harrison Garama Kombe	ODM	

win was also nullified by the high courts on 2024

== Wards ==
Ward	Population*
Adu	43,005
Sabaki	16,317
Garashi	25,781
Gongoni	34,597
Magarini	40,694
Marafa	16,847
Total	177,241
*September 2022.
