= Simeon Nyachae =

Kenyan politician and entrepreneur (1932–2021)

- Born: 6 February 1932; Kenya Colony
- Died: 1 February 2021 (aged 88)
- Citizenship: Kenya
- Occupations: Politician, entrepreneur
- Known for: Politics, investments
- Title: Former Cabinet Secretary of Finance in the Cabinet of Kenya

Simeon Nyachae (6 February 1932 – 1 February 2021) was a Kenyan politician, government minister in both the Moi administration and the Kibaki administration, as well as a businessman from Kisii County. He invested in London, South Africa, Brazil, Zimbabwe, Australia and the US.

== Early life and education ==
Nyachae was born into a large polygamous family in Nyaribari, in the then South Kavirondo District of Nyanza Province in Kenya Colony, on 6 February 1932 to colonial chief Musa Nyandusi and the late Pauline Bosibori Nyandusi. In 1941, his father enrolled him in the Nyanchwa Seventh-day Adventist School, and in 1947, he joined the Kereri Intermediate School. Two years later, in 1949, he joined the Kisii Government African School but withdrew in 1953, just a year before he was due to sit for the Ordinary Level School Certificate. He then took up employment at his father's chief's camp as a district clerk. He later attended Torquay Academy and Churchill College, Cambridge, both in the United Kingdom.

== Career ==
=== Civil service ===
Nyachae's career in the civil service began at this point. In 1957, he went to study public administration in London, returning to Kenya in 1960. Upon his return, Nyachae was posted as a district officer in Kangundo Division and later returned to Churchill College, Cambridge for a diploma course in public administration. He became a district commissioner by December 1963. Upon his arrival back in Kenya in 1964, he went back to provincial administration and began to steadily rise up the ranks within the provincial administration, ending up with a position as a provincial commissioner from 1965 to 1979. He later served as the chief secretary in the civil service under the governments of Jomo Kenyatta and Daniel Arap Moi.

=== Politics ===
Upon his retirement from the civil service, Nyachae was arguably one of the most prominent personalities from Kisii County. He won a parliamentary seat in 1992. His election in Nyaribari Chache Constituency was instrumental in his entry into the Moi government as a cabinet minister first for agriculture and later for finance.

In 1999, he fell out of favor with Moi and resigned from the government after having been moved to the less influential Ministry of Industry. He also left the Kenya African National Union (KANU) to join the opposition, Ford–People, which was by then only a small party with roots in Central Kenya and three deputies in parliament.

==== 2002 General Elections ====
Nyachae's plans to run for the presidency did not receive wide support, as the main opposition groups cooperated with Mwai Kibaki's Democratic Party to form the National Alliance of Kenya, which then teamed up with Raila Odinga's Liberal Democratic Party (LDP) to form the National Rainbow Coalition (NARC).

During the 2002 general elections, Nyachae did not succeed in his presidential bid, but was able to enter parliament with a 14-member Ford–People faction, having won all constituencies in Kisii. Besides KANU, Ford–People was the only sizeable opposition party in the 2002 parliament.

==== Cabinet in the Kibaki Administration ====
When president Mwai Kibaki's National Rainbow Coalition started to crumble, the support of Ford–People became more welcomed. In 2004, when president Kibaki was facing strong opposition from his cabinet, he recalled Nyachae to the government as the Minister for Energy and later the Minister for Roads.

Nyachae unsuccessfully ran in the 2007 parliamentary elections. The opposition wave swept his Kisii stronghold and he was soundly defeated, as many government ministers and Ford–People candidates running for office were viewed as being tightly linked with him. In 2002, all the members of parliament were from Ford people party which was headed by Mr Nyachae.

=== Business ===
Nyachae ran a chain of businesses ranging in nature from agriculture, banking, real estate, transportation and manufacturing.

== Personal life ==
Prior to falling ill in 2018, Nyachae's family included five wives and over 20 children. His wives were the late Esther Nyaboke Nyachae, the late Drusilla Kerubo Nyachae, Martha Mwango Nyachae, Silvia Nyokabi (Divorced) and Grace Wamuyu Nyachae. In April 2018, Nyachae tripped and fell at his home in the Loresho neighborhood in northwest Nairobi. He was initially admitted to The Nairobi Hospital for one week, but was then airlifted to London when he did not recover as expected.

=== Death ===
Nyachae died on 1 February 2021 at the age of 88, as reported by his family, five days short from his 89th birthday.

== Controversy ==
Nyachae was named in the Waki Report as one of the masterminds of the 2007–08 post-election violence in which more than 1,600 people died, as he was believed to have organised attacks on ODM opposition leaders.
