= Mwalimu (name) =

Mwalimu can be a masculine given name or a surname. Notable people with the name include:

== Given name ==
- Mwalimu Ally (born 1953), Tanzanian sprinter
- Mwalimu Masudi Mwahima (1949–2020), Kenyan politician

== Surname ==
- Mbeki Mwalimu, Kenyan actress, producer, and director
- Selemani Mwalimu (born 2006), Tanzanian football striker
- Ummy Mwalimu, Tanzanian politician
