= Harrison Kombe =

Kenyan politician

Harrison Mwalimu Garama Kombe

Member of the Kenya National Assembly
- Constituency: Magarini Constituency
- Preceded by: Amason Kingi Jeffah
- Succeeded by: Vacated (election nullified)

Personal details
- Born: 1956 (age 69–70) Magarini, Kilifi County, Kenya
- Party: Shirikisho Party (2002–2007); United Republican Party (2013–2017); Jubilee Coalition (2017–2022)
- Education: Machakos Technical School
- Occupation: Teacher, Politician
- Profession: Teacher

Harrison Mwalimu Garama Kombe (born 1956 in Magarini, Kilifi County) is a Kenyan teacher and politician. He was first elected to the Kenya National Assembly from Magarini Constituency on the ticket of Shirikisho Party in 2002. He suffered a defeat in 2007 and returned to the parliament in 2013 and was reelected in 2017 before being defeated again in the 2022 parliamentary election.

== Career ==
Harrison Kombe was trained at Machakos Technical School. 1979 he joined Lawfords Hotel as an electrician. From 1985 to 1986 he was a teacher at Nairobi Technical School and later transferred to Malindi High School where he taught from 1987 to 1988. He moved to Kinango Secondary & Technical School and taught there for a year before transferring to Sheikh Khalifa Secondary & Technical School where he taught from 1990 to 1996. He ended his teaching career at Marafa Secondary School and Kikoneni Secondary School in 2002 when he joined politics.

He was elected to the 9th Kenyan National Assembly from Magarini Constituency on the ticket of Shirikisho Party in 2002. He was defeated in the 2007 elections by Amason Kingi Jeffah. He challenged the result in court which led to the nullification of the election and a by-election was ordered. In the by-election, he was again defeated by Amason Kingi Jeffah. After the defeat, he went back to his teaching career and taught from 2008 to 2013 when he reclaimed the Magarini seat in the parliament on the ticket of URP and the support of Jubilee coalition. In the 2013 election, the incumbent Amason kingi jeffa did not run as he contested and won the governorship seat of Kilifi. In the 11th parliament, Kombe served on the Catering and Health Club Committee and Departmental Committee on Education, Research and Technology. He was reelected in 2017 and 2022 but the 2022 election was challenged by his opponent leading to nullification of the election by both high court and appeal court on the grounds of irregularities.
