= Othaya Constituency =

Kenyan electoral constituency

Othaya Constituency is an electoral constituency in Kenya. It is one of six constituencies in Nyeri County. Othaya Constituency comprises Othaya division of Nyeri County and was established for the 1966 elections. It has a population of 91,081 people (2019 census).

Othaya is the main town located in this constituency. Mwai Kibaki, the former president of Kenya, was the Othaya MP since 1974 until 2013. He had earlier been the MP of Doonholm Constituency (now Makadara).

== Members of Parliament ==
Elections	MP	Party	Notes
1966	Joseph P Mathenge	KANU	One-party system
1969	Kega Muthua	KANU	One-party system
1974	Mwai Kibaki	KANU	One-party system
1979	Mwai Kibaki	KANU	One-party system
1983	Mwai Kibaki	KANU	One-party system.
1988	Mwai Kibaki	KANU	One-party system.
1992	Mwai Kibaki	Democratic Party	
1997	Mwai Kibaki	Democratic Party	Elected Leader of the Opposition.
2002	Mwai Kibaki	NARC/DP	Elected president of Kenya.
December 2007	Mwai Kibaki	PNU	Elected president of Kenya.
March 2013	Mary Wambui	TNA	
August 2017	Mugambi James Gichuki	Jubilee	
August 2022	Michael Wambugu Wainaina	UDA	

== Locations and wards ==
Locations	Population
Chinga	22,697
Iria-Ini	25,755
Karima	20,649
Mahiga	24,276
Total	93,377

Ward	Registered voters	Local authority
Kanyange	1,162	Othaya town
Kianganda	1,962	Othaya town
Nduye River	2,727	Othaya town
Nyamari	3,464	Othaya town
Thuti	2,322	Othaya town
Chinga	12,758	Nyeri County
Iria-Ini	8,020	Nyeri County
Karima	6,097	Nyeri County
Mahiga	7,585	Nyeri County
Mumwe	5,691	Nyeri County
Total	51,788	
*September 2005
