= Wanjare-South Mugirango Constituency =

Former Kenyan electoral constituency

Wanjare-South Mugirango
- Former constituency for the Parliament of Kenya
- Map Interactive map of boundaries from 1963 to 1988
- District: Kisii District

Former constituency
- Created: 1963
- Abolished: 1988
- Number of members: One
- Replaced by: Bonchari & South Mugirango

Wanjare-South Mugirango was an electoral constituency in Kisii District of Nyanza Province in Kenya. Created for the 1963 general elections, it is one of the six original constituencies of Kisii District and among the 117 constituencies of independent Kenya. The constituency was abolished in 1988 Kenyan general election, and split into Bonchari & South Mugirango.

== Members of Parliament ==
Elections	Member of Parliament	Party	Notes
1963	Samuel Kibwage	KANU	Inaugural elections in independent Kenya
1969	Sylvester Nyakweba		
1974	Mark Bosire		
1979	Mark Bosire		
1983	Reuben Oyondi		Constituency abolished in 1988
