= Othaya =

Town in Kenya

Coordinates: 0°33′S 36°57′E

Othaya is a Kenyan town about 120 kilometres north of Nairobi, the capital. As of the 1999 census, Othaya had a population of 21,427, of which 4,108 were classified as core urban; the majority of the residents belong to the Kikuyu ethnic group. Othaya is part of Nyeri County. It has been a traditionally agricultural area with coffee and tea as the main cash crops, with many residents being subsistence farmers. Othaya is home to Chinga dam, the largest water reservoir in Nyeri County.

Mwai Kibaki, the third and former President of Kenya, as well as the third Member of Parliament of Othaya (1974-2013) was born in Gatuyaini, a village in Othaya.

Othaya forms a town council, which has five wards: Kanyange, Kianganda, Nduye River, Nyamari and Thuti. All of them are part of Othaya Constituency. Othaya serves as the headquarters of Othaya administrative division, which has four locations: Chinga, Iria-Ini, Karima and Mahiga. Othaya division has a population of 88,291 (1999 census). Othaya division shares a border with Othaya constituency, which Mwai Kibaki represented in parliament until 2013. The current member of parliament is Hon. Wambugu Wainaina of UDA, elected in the 2022 general elections. Prominent institutions of education in Othaya town include Othaya Boys' High School, Stellamaris Othaya Girls' High School, Chinga Boys' High School, and several other schools.

The Othaya Stadium acts as the town's main public square for social and political meetings, as well as hosting various sporting and entertainment events in the town.
