= Declaration of Delhi =

Legal conference in India (1959)

The New Delhi Congress or Declaration of Delhi was an international gathering of over 185 judges, lawyers, and law professors from 53 countries all over the world, united as the International Commission of Jurists that took place in New Delhi, India in 1959. The theme of the New Delhi Congress was "The Rule of Law in a Free Society". The Congress further developed the principles and procedures underlying the Rule of Law as well as defining and clarifying the concept itself.

== History ==
In Anglo-American tradition, the most influential version of the rule of law has been that popularized by British jurist A.V. Dicey in 1885. Dicey's doctrine on the rule of law is a threefold one:

- (i) The absolute supremacy or predominance of 'regular' law as opposed to the influence of arbitrary power and the absence of discretionary authority on the part of the government. No man is punishable or can be lawfully made to suffer in body or goods except for a distinct breach of law established in the ordinary legal manner before the ordinary courts.
- (ii) Equality before the law. All persons whether high official or ordinary citizen are subject to the same law administered by the ordinary courts.
- (iii) The constitution in the result of the ordinary law of the land developed by the judges on a case-by-case basis. It is thus woven into the very fabric of law and not superimposed from above. This is essentially a defense to the United Kingdom's unwritten constitution.

Modern lawyers would regard the rule of law as essentially a political or moral idea, although nonetheless important for that, since it affects the way the law is developed and applied. It concerns ideas of regularity, access to the courts, fair procedure and honoring expectations. The 'rule of law' in Dicey's sense was a political factor that led to the enactment of the Crown Proceedings Act 1947 in the United Kingdom. Before that Act the Crown, that is, the central government, was immune from liability in the courts for breach of contract or for injuries inflicted by its servants.

Since the Second World War there have been several attempts to draw up Internationally binding codes of basic human rights. The Nuremberg Trials of Nazi war criminals that were organized by the victorious allies were based upon the assumption that some of the laws of Nazi Germany were not valid as they were repugnant to the standards of morality accepted by all civilized nations. This approach to law raises profound philosophical problems, but the role of modern human rights treaties and declarations is a less dramatic one. These include the United Nations Universal Declaration of Human Rights (1948), and the Declaration of Delhi or New Delhi Congress (1959).

== The Modern Concept of the Rule of Law ==
=== Introduction ===
The Delhi Congress gave rise to three important elements in the concept of the Rule of Law.

- First, that the individual is possessed of certain rights and freedoms and that he is entitled to protection of these rights and freedoms by the State;
- Second, that there is an absolute need for an independent judiciary and bar as well as for effective machinery for the protection of fundamental rights and freedoms; and
- Third, that the establishment of social, economic and cultural conditions would permit men to live in dignity and to fulfill their legitimate aspirations.

In preparation of the Congress, the Commission held a preparatory meeting in The Hague, Netherlands on 7 and 8 July 1958, where the drafting of the Congress Working Paper on the Rule of Law was mandated to former ICJ Secretary-General, Mr Norman Marsh. The 134 page paper was based on information gathered in an international survey of lawyers and legal institutions conducted by the ICJ Secretariat in the course of 1957. The information gathered was divided into the following sections:

- 1. The Legislative and the Rule of Law
- 2. The Executive and the Rule of Law
- 3. Criminal Process and the Rule of Law
- 4. The Judiciary and Legal Profession under the Rule of Law.

The committees set up during the congress were each dedicated to one of the four themes with the Working Paper providing the basis of the discussions. The reports and conclusions of the committees were presented in two plenary sessions and the texts were subsequently referred to a steering committee, which issued the conclusions at the closing plenary session.

=== The Legislative and the Rule of Law ===
In its conclusions, the committee on the legislative stated that under the Rule of Law, the legislature carried out the function of creating and maintaining conditions that would uphold the dignity of man. This would include recognition of civil and political rights as well as the establishment of the social, economic, educational and cultural conditions, which the committee deemed essential to the full development of the individual's personality.

The committee also stated that minimum standards and principles regulating the individual within society were essential for the Rule of Law. Such standards would, however, imply certain limitations on legislative power. The limitations on the legislative should be enshrined in a constitution and safeguarded by an independent judicial tribunal.

According to the conclusions of the committee, the legislative had the responsibility to: abstain from enacting retroactive penal legislation; not discriminate in its laws between one citizen and another; not interfere with freedom of religious belief; not deny members of society the right to responsible government; not place restrictions on the freedom of speech, assembly or association; not impair the exercise of fundamental rights and freedoms of the individual; and provide the procedural mechanisms to protect the above-mentioned freedoms ("procedure of due process").

=== The Executive and the Rule of Law ===
The committee on the executive concluded that the granting of power by the legislative to the executive should be undertaken within the narrowest possible limits and that legislature should define the extent and purpose of such delegated powers, as well as the procedures by which such delegated power was to be brought into effect. An independent judicial body should be given the power to review the legislation passed by the executive (Judicial review).

When the executive directly and adversely affected a person or the property rights of an individual, he or she should have the right to present his or her case before a court as well as the right to an adequate remedy. In the absence of a judicial review mechanism, antecedent procedures of hearing, inquiry and consultation should be established, through which parties whose rights or interests would be affected can have an adequate opportunity to make representation.

The committee also concluded that the Rule of Law would be strengthened if the executive were to be required to formulate its reasons when reaching its decisions, and at the request of a concerned party, to communicate them.

=== Criminal Process and the Rule of Law ===
The committee considered the practical application of the Rule of Law in the field of criminal process. The committee clarified rules which it regarded as the minimum necessary to ensure the observance of the Rule of Law.

The committee made its conclusions regarding the prohibition of retrospective enactment of penal legislation (certainty of the law) as well as on the principle of presumption of innocence, which in the committee's view required that the burden of proof should only be shifted once facts creating a contrary presumption had been established.

Concerning the arrest of an individual, the power to arrest should be regulated and the arrested person should be told at once the grounds of his or her arrest. He or she should be entitled to a legal adviser and be brought before a judicial authority within a short period of time.

In relation to pre-trial detention, the committee listed the rights of the arrested, including the right to apply for bail.

Conclusions were also made in respect to the preparation and conduct of the defense and the minimum duties of the prosecution. These included the requirement that the prosecution not withhold favorable evidence from the accused.

Regarding the examination of the accused, the committee laid down minimum standards, such as respect for the right not to incriminate oneself and provisions that guarantee the physical and psychological integrity of the accused.

The committee also made conclusions regarding trial in public for criminal cases and the right to appeals and remedies.

Lastly, the committee concluded that the Rule of Law did not require any particular theory regarding punishment, but must necessarily condemn cruel, inhuman or excessive preventive measures or punishments and thus the committee supported the adoption of reformative measures wherever possible.

=== The Judiciary and the Legal Professions under the Rule of Law ===
The committee on the Judiciary and the Legal Profession emphasized the importance of an independent judiciary in upholding the Rule of Law. The independence of the judiciary would be safeguarded by certain measures, including co-operation between at least two branches of the state (i.e. judiciary and legislative) on the appointment of judges. Furthermore, the committee perceived the "irremovability" of the judiciary as an important safeguard of the Rule of Law.

Regarding the legal profession, the committee deemed an organized legal profession free to manage its own affairs to be essential. While a lawyer should be free to accept any case which is offered to him, he should also in some cases be obliged to defend persons with whom he does not sympathize.

The committee also addressed the issue of equal access to the justice. It was perceived to be the primary obligation of the legal profession to use its best efforts to ensure that adequate legal advice and representation were provided. The state and community would however have the obligation to assist the legal profession in carrying out this responsibility.

== The Declaration of Delhi ==
This International Congress of Jurists, consisting of 185 judges, practicing lawyers and teachers of law from 53 countries, assembled in New Delhi in January 1959 under the aegis of the International Commission of Jurists, having discussed freely and frankly the Rule of Law and the administration of justice throughout the world, and having reached conclusions regarding the legislative, the executive, the criminal process, the judiciary and the legal profession, (which conclusions are annexed to this Declaration),

Now solemnly

Reaffirms the principles expressed in the Act of Athens adopted by the International Congress of Jurists in 1955, particularly that independent judiciary and legal profession are essential to the maintenance of the Rule of Law and to the proper administration of justice;

Recognizes that the Rule of Law is a dynamic concept for the expansion and fulfillment of which jurists are primarily responsible and which should be employed not only to safeguard and advance the civil and political rights of the individual in a free society, but also to establish social, economic, educational and cultural conditions under which his legitimate aspirations and dignity may be realized;

Calls on the jurists in all countries to give effect in their own communities to the principles expressed in the conclusions of the Congress; and finally

Requests the International Commission of Jurists

- 1. To employ its full resources to give practical effect throughout the world to the principles expressed in the conclusions of the Congress.
- 2. To give special attention and assistance to countries now in the process of establishing, reorganizing or consolidating their political and legal institutions.
- 3. To encourage law students and the junior members of the legal profession to support the Rule of Law.
- 4. To communicate this Declaration and the annexed conclusions to governments, to interested international organizations, and to associations of lawyers throughout the world.

This Declaration shall be known as the Declaration of Delhi.

Done at Delhi this 10th day of January 1959
