= Zebedeo John Opore =

Kenyan politician (1947–2024)

Member of the National Assembly of Kenya
- In office 1997–2007
- Succeeded by: Charles Onyancha
- Constituency: Bonchari

Personal details
- Born: January 8, 1947 Kenya
- Died: October 18, 2024 (aged 77) Kenya
- Education: University of Nairobi (BA in Economics) University of Bradford (MSc in Economics)
- Profession: Politician, Economist
- Known for: Assistant Minister in the Ministry of Information & Broadcasting

Zebedeo John Opore (8 January 1947 – 18 October 2024) was a Kenyan politician. He was elected to represent the Bonchari Constituency in the National Assembly of Kenya in the 1997 Kenyan general election. He also served as the Assistant Minister in the Ministry of Information & Broadcasting. He later lost the seat in the 2007 election to Charles Onyancha.

Opore read economics at the University of Nairobi. He also obtained an MSc in Economics from the University of Bradford in the UK in 1982.

Opore died on 18 October 2024, at the age of 77.
