= List of non-governmental organisations in Kenya =

This is a list of domestic and international non-governmental organisations (NGOs) operating in Kenya.

== List ==
=== A ===
- African Conservation Centre
- African Wildlife Foundation
- Aga Khan Foundation
- Amici del Mondo World Friends Onlus
- Amref Health Africa
- Asante Africa Foundation
- Accountacore Africa

=== C ===
- Carolina for Kibera
- Cemiride

=== E ===
- East African Wildlife Society

=== F ===
- Family Health International
- Fauna and Flora International
- FEMNET
- The Fred Hollows Foundation
- Friends of Peoples Close to Nature

=== G ===
- Green Pamoja Initiative

=== H ===
- HF Foundation
- Awareness Against Human Trafficking (HAART)

=== J ===
- Jamii Bora

=== K ===
- Kenya Human Rights Commission
- Komaza

=== M ===
- Mercy Corps

=== S ===
- SNV Netherlands Development Organisation

=== T ===
- The Youth Cafe
