= Philip Waki =

Kenyan judge

Philip Waki is a retired Kenyan judge. He is best known for heading the 2008 Commission of Inquiry into Post-Election Violence, also known as the Waki Commission. He retired from the Court of Appeal in October 2019 . He is also the cousin to Lawyer Mutula Kilonzo the personal lawyer to Kenya's Second President Daniel Arap Moi.

In April 2012, the Kenya Judges and Magistrates Vetting Board cleared Justice Waki suitable to continue holding office.

On 3 December 2013, Waki was elected President of the Residual Special Court for Sierra Leone.
