= Mishi Juma =

Kenyan politician

Mishi Juma Khamisi Mboko Honorable

Member of Parliament For Likoni Constituency
- Incumbent
- Assumed office 2017- 2022,2022-present
- President: William Ruto
- Preceded by: Mwalim Masoud Mwahima

County Woman Representative for Mombasa County
- In office 2013–2017
- Preceded by: Position Created
- Succeeded by: Asha Hussein Mohamed

Personal details
- Born: Mishi Juma Kenya
- Party: Orange Democratic Movement
- Education: University of Nairobi, Moi University
- Occupation: Politician

Mishi Juma Khamisi Mboko is a Kenyan politician and a Member of Parliament for Likoni Constituency in Mombasa County. Mishi Mboko has been a member of the Orange Democratic Movement (ODM), since 2017

== Education ==
Mishi Juma attended Mtongwe Primary School where she obtained Kenya Certificate of Primary Education from 1978 to 1985. She attended Likoni Secondary School where she obtained Kenya Certificate of Secondary Education from 1986 to 1989. She graduated from the University of Nairobi with Diploma in Public Relations from 2004 to 2005. In 2012 she graduated from Moi University where she obtained her Bachelor of Science (Bsc.) Communications and Public Relations. She also obtained Certificate in Secretarial and Office management as a private candidate in PITMAN 1990-1991 and Diploma in Banking part 1 as Private candidate in KNEC 1991–1992.

== Career ==
Mishi Mboko career started in 1993 as a Personal Assistant to the managing director at C. Mehta & Co. Chemist in Mombasa. In 1993 to 1994, she worked as Office Manager for Composite Insurance Company, from 1995 to 2005 and as an Administration Manager for Swara Forwarders in Mombasa. She started working from 2005 to 2010 as community engager and manager in private businesses. From 2010 to 2012 she worked as a Public Officer for Kwale County council. She has been a board member of the Central Agricultural Board since 2010.

== Political life ==
Mishi Juma Mboko served as the Mombasa Woman Representative from 2013 to 2017, with the aim of initiating women empowerment programmes. Mishi Juma Mboko is a member of the Kenyan National Assembly and the Orange Democratic Movement party and currently serves as member of Parliament (MP) for Likoni Constituency. She took over from Mwalim Masoud Mwahima in 2017 and was re-elected in 2022 as a member of the 13th parliament of Kenya. She was one of several women MPs who were the only woman elected in their county. The others included Mary Maingi in Kirinyaga County, Naisula Lesuuda in Samburu County and Mary Emaase in Busia County.

== See also ==
- 13th parliament of Kenya
