= Phoebe Asiyo =

Kenyan politician (1932–2025)

Mama Phoebe Asiyo
- Asiyo on the cover of her book It is Possible
- Born: 12 September 1932; Kenya
- Died: 16 July 2025 (aged 92); North Carolina, U.S.
- Education: Gendia Primary School; Kamagambo High School; Kangaru Teachers College
- Occupations: Politician, activist
- Known for: Advocacy for women's rights, gender equality, and education for girls
- Office: Member of Parliament for Karachuonyo
- Children: Caesar Asiyo
- Awards: Order of the Grand Warrior; Order of the Burning Spear (Chief); Honorary Doctor of Humane Letters (Lehigh University); Honorary Doctor of Laws (University of York, 2002)

Phoebe Muga Asiyo (12 September 1932 – 16 July 2025) was a Kenyan politician and an ambassador to the United Nations Development Fund for Women (UNIFEM). She was UNIFEM's ambassador from 1988 to 1992. She was the first woman elevated to the position of Luo elder for her efforts to promote education for girls, women's rights, and gender equality in Kenya. Fondly called Mama Asiyo, she dedicated her life to improving the political arena in Kenya, the role of women and girls, and those affected by the HIV epidemic. She was the first woman in Kenya with its 42 communities to become an elder.

== Career ==
=== Pre-2000 ===
Asiyo went to Gendia Primary school and later joined high school at Kamagambo, in South Nyanza District, and then attended Kangaru Teachers College in Embu District.

She joined the Maendeleo Ya Wanawake organisation in 1953 and was elected president of the same in 1958. During her tenure, she advocated for the economic empowerment of the African woman through establishing small-scale businesses and advocating for better farming methods. She further lobbied for the improvement of women's and maternal health care and nutrition and more involvement of women in the three arms of government. She became the first African Woman Senior Superintendent of Women's Prison in 1963 on the eve of independence.

Asiyo was elected to Kenyan parliament from the Karachuonyo Constituency seat in 1980 and held the seat until 1983, when parliament was dissolved. She was reelected to parliament in 1992 after the multi-party system came into being, and she continued to serve until 1997. She held the distinction of being one of the longest-serving women in parliament in Kenya.

In 1997, Phoebe Asiyo tabled a motion on affirmative action to increase women's participation in leadership and decision making in parliament and local authorities to at least 33%. Despite the fact that the motion was defeated, she laid the grounds for reforms that bore fruits with the promulgation of the 2010 Kenyan Constitution and brought a shift in female representation in leadership. In 2000 Beth Mugo successfully tabled the affirmative action motion and it was referred to the Constitution Review Commission of Kenya (CRCK).

She was the UNIFEM ambassador from 1988 to 1992.

=== Post-2000 ===
In 2001 Asiyo was selected to be a Commissioner of the Constitution Review Committee (CRC). Asiyo was part of the delegation to Uganda to advocate for the participation of women in the peace talks in Uganda.

She served until her death as chair of the Caucus for Women's Leadership, formerly called the Kenya Women's Political Caucus, where she mentored young women and advocated for women in leadership roles. In 2018 she launched her memoir: It is Possible at a ceremony that was graced by President Uhuru Kenyatta, Deputy President William Ruto, and former prime ministers alongside other notable government officials and women leaders.

== Death ==
Asiyo died in North Carolina, United States on 16 July 2025, at the age of 92. (Note: Some sources mislabel her age as "93".) Asiyo died of a stroke while visiting family in the United States. Her son Caesar Asiyo said medics found it difficult to manage her condition due to her age.

Asiyo was born 12 September 1932 in Kenya. She was the first African chairperson of Maendeleo Ya Wanawake in 1958 and the first woman appointed Assistant Superintendent of Prisons by the colonial government in 1963. She was the first woman in Kenya with its 42 communities to become an elder for her efforts to promote education for girls and women's rights.

She served as Karachuonyo MP from 1979 to 1983 and again from 1992 to 1997, defeating David Okiki Amayo in 1979 with the backing of Jaramogi Oginga Odinga. In 1997 she tabled the Affirmative Action Motion in Parliament, later called the “Phoebe Asiyo Motion,” which laid groundwork for the two-thirds gender rule in Kenya’s 2010 Constitution.

From 1969 to 1980 she was Chief Executive Officer of the Child Welfare Society of Kenya, succeeding Pamela Mboya. She operationalised the Children and Young Persons Act, Adoption Act, and Guardianship of Infants Act, and established Temporary Places of Safety for children in Kanduyi and Isiolo.

She received honorary doctorates from Lehigh and York Universities and the Order of the Grand Warrior from the Government of Kenya.

== Honours and awards ==
- Order of the Golden Warrior: 1st class chief of the burning spear.
- Doctor of Humane Letters from Lehigh University
- Honorary Doctorate Law Degree from the University of York (2002).
