= Marafa =

Marafa Hell's Kitchen

- Location within Kenya
- Coordinates: 3.03°S 39.95°E
- Country: Kenya
- County: Kilifi County
- Time zone: UTC+3 (EAT)

The Marafa also known as Hell's Kitchen or Devil's Kitchen, is a settlement in Kenya's Kilifi County. Best known for the Marafa Depression, a vast canyon-like area resulting from soil erosion.

== A picture ==
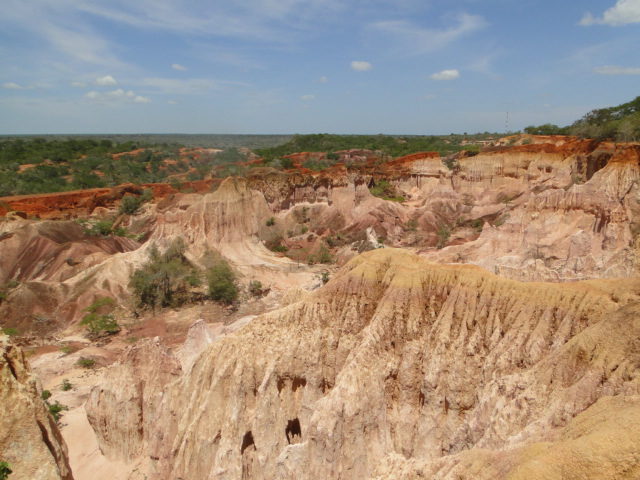
Marafa Depression 2011
