= James Kwanya Rege =

Kenyan politician

James Kwanya Rege is a Kenyan politician and an engineer by profession. He belongs to the Orange Democratic Movement and was elected to represent the Karachuonyo Constituency in the National Assembly of Kenya since the 2007 Kenyan parliamentary election. He was also elected as the chairman of the Telecommunication and communications during this period. He was re-elected on a second term on the same party ticket during 4 March 2013 general elections.
