= Charles Onyancha =

Kenyan politician

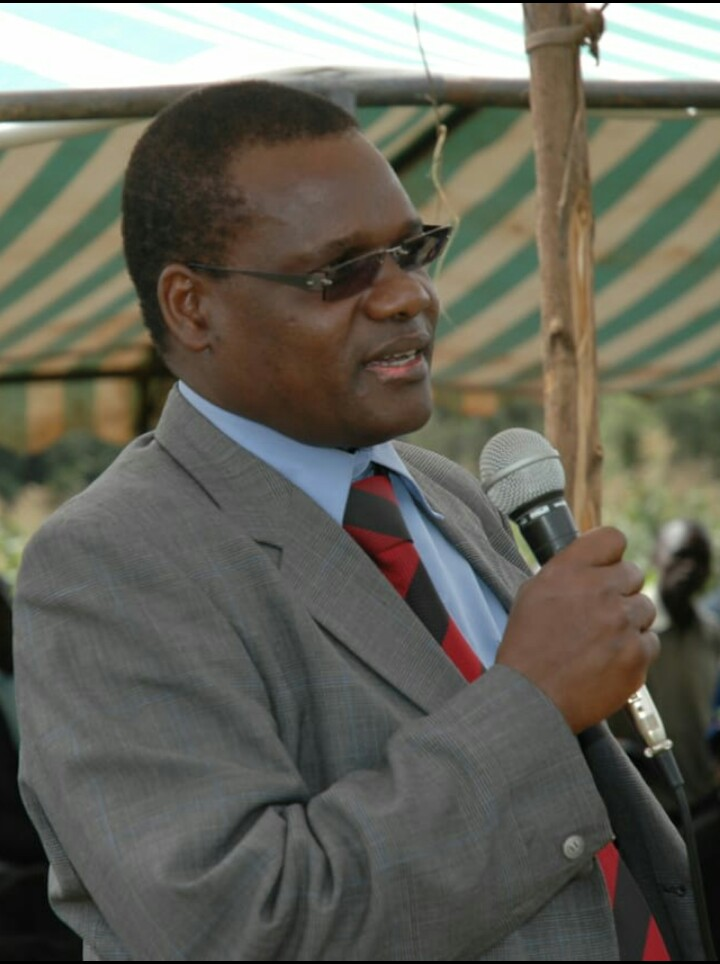
Charles Onyancha

Charles Onyancha (born 7 March 1952) is a Kenyan politician. He belongs to the Orange Democratic Movement and was elected to represent Bonchari Constituency in the National Assembly of Kenya since the 2007 Kenyan parliamentary election.
