= Sisi Kwa Sisi =

Political party in Kenya

The Sisi Kwa Sisi is a political party in Kenya. Sisi Kwa Sisi means "all of us" or "together as one" (literally "us for us") in Swahili. At the last legislative elections, 27 December 2002, the party won 2 out of 212 elected seats.

At the Kenyan general election, 2007, Sisi Kwa Sisi is part of the newly created Party of National Unity led by President Mwai Kibaki.
