= Karachuonyo Constituency =

Electoral consistency in Kenya

Karachuonyo Constituency is an electoral constituency in Kenya. It is one of eight constituencies in Homa Bay County. The current member of parliament is Andrew Adipo Okuome.

== Members of Parliament ==
| Elections | MP | Party | Notes |
|---|---|---|---|
| 1963 | Elijah Omolo Agar | Independent | |
| 1969 | David Okiki Amayo | KANU | One-party system |
| 1974 | David Okiki Amayo | KANU | One-party system |
| 1979 | Phoeba Muga Asiyo | KANU | One-party system |
| 1983 | Phoeba Muga Asiyo | KANU | One-party system. |
| 1988 | David Okiki Amayo/ Lazarus Ombayi Amayo | KANU | One-party system. |
| 1992 | Phoeba Muga Asiyo | Ford-Kenya | Defeated for re-election by Awiti in 1997 |
| 1997 | Paul Adhu Awiti | NDP | |
| 2002 | Paul Adhu Awiti | NARC | Defeated for re-election by Rege in 2007. |
| 2007 | James Kwanya Rege | ODM | |
| 2013 | James Kwanya Rege | ODM | |
| 2017 | Adipo Okuome | ODM | |
| 2022 | Adipo Okuome | ODM | |

== Wards ==
| Ward | Registered Voters * | Local Authority |
|---|---|---|
| Central Karachuonyo | 3,847 | Rachuonyo Sub County |
| Gendia / Awach | 3,331 | Kendu Bay Town |
| Gumba / Jieri | 4,121 | Kendu Bay Town |
| Kanyaluo | 6,371 | Rachuonyo sub County |
| Kibiri | 6,205 | Rachuonyo sub County |
| North West Karachuonyo | 8,076 | Rachuonyo sub County |
| Rambira | 2,283 | Kendu Bay Town |
| Simbi / Kogembo | 3,282 | Kendu Bay Town |
| Wang'chieng / Karabondi | 7,905 | Rachuonyo sub County |
| West Karachuonyo | 7,053 | Rachuonyo sub County |
| Total | 52,474 | |
*September 2005.
