= Waki Commission =

The Waki Commission, officially The Commission of Inquiry on Post Election Violence (CIPEV), was an international commission of inquiry established by the Government of Kenya in February 2008 to investigate the clashes in Kenya following the disputed Kenyan presidential election of 2007.

== Background ==
The Kenyan presidential election of 2007 was held in December 2007. The main contenders were incumbent President of Kenya, Mwai Kibaki and his former ally Raila Odinga. The election was strongly marked by tribalism, with Kibaki coming from the most numerous Kikuyu ethnic group which has dominated Kenyan politics since independence and Odinga an ethnic Luo allied with other smaller ethnic groups. Kibaki was declared the winner and sworn in on 30 December, despite opposition leader Raila Odinga's claims of victory. Odinga and many international observers claimed the elections were at least partially manipulated. Following the declaration, violent protests erupted particularly in Kibera, and this included ethnic violence targeted against Kikuyu people living outside their traditional settlement areas, especially in the Rift Valley Province. Luos and Kalenjin were also targeted in the areas surrounding Nakuru and Naivasha.

Former UN Secretary General Kofi Annan brokered a power-sharing agreement which included the appointment of the Waki Commission to investigate the violence.

== Composition ==
The chairman of the commission was Justice Philip Waki, a Judge of Kenya's Court of Appeal. The other two commission members were Gavin Alistair McFadyen, a former police assistant commissioner in New Zealand and Pascal K. Kambale, a lawyer from the Democratic Republic of the Congo who was working on the Open Society Institute's Africa Governance, Monitoring and Advocacy Project. The secretary to the commission was George Mong’are Kegoro, an advocate of the High Court of Kenya and Kenyan section director of the International Commission of Jurists. The assisting counsel was David Shikomera Majanja, an advocate of the High Court of Kenya.

== Report ==
The post-election violence report by Waki Commission, commonly known as the "Waki report", was handed over to president Mwai Kibaki and prime minister Raila Odinga on 15 October 2008. The report has 529 pages. The report however did not publicly disclose the alleged perpetrators in the report handed to the President. The Waki Commission instead handed the list of alleged perpetrators to Kofi Annan. In July 2009 Kofi Annan handed the envelope to Luis Moreno-Ocampo, the Prosecutor at the ICC. The Kenyan Government was then given 1-year, beginning July 2009, to set up a Tribunal to deal with issue. Failure to do this would see the ICC would pick up the matter beginning August 2010. Daily Nation, 13, 20 July

== Cost ==
In response to a query by Joseph Lekuton, on 16 December 2008, Orwa Ojode the Assistant Minister for Provincial Administration and Internal Security confirmed to parliament that the commission had cost Kshs 7,635,694 with the Kenya Government contributing Kshs 5,951,930 and donors contributing Kshs 1,683,764.

== See also ==
- Politics of Kenya
- History of Kenya
- Ethnic Conflicts in Kenya
- Kriegler Commission
