= Mwai Kibaki =

President of Kenya from 2002 to 2013

His Excellency Mwai Kibaki CGH
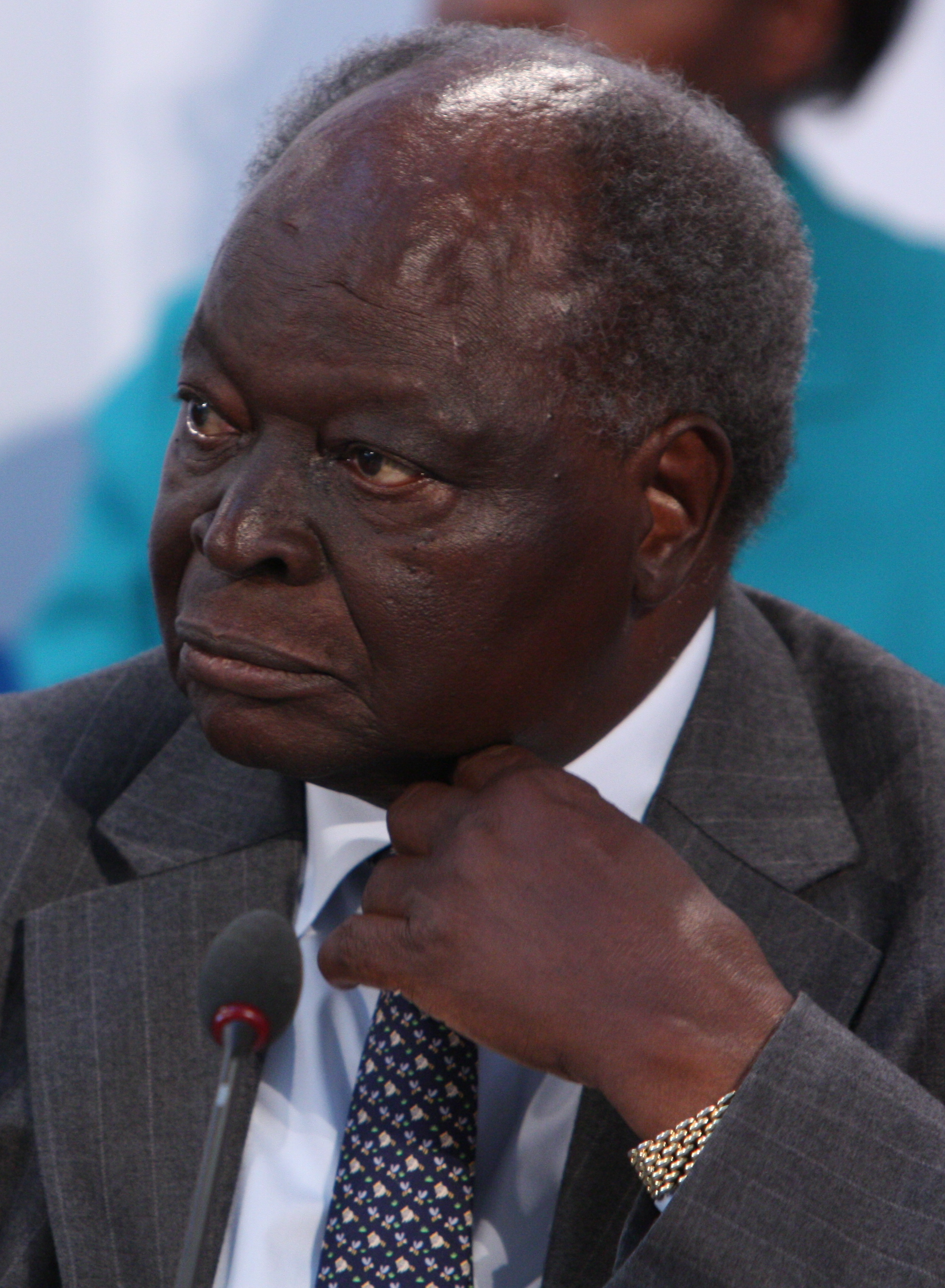
- Kibaki in 2012

3rd President of Kenya
- In office 30 December 2002 – 9 April 2013
- Prime Minister: Raila Odinga(2008–13)
- Vice President: Michael Wamalwa; Moody Awori; Kalonzo Musyoka
- Preceded by: Daniel Arap Moi
- Succeeded by: Uhuru Muigai Kenyatta

Minister for Health
- In office 1988–1991
- President: Daniel Arap Moi
- Preceded by: Samuel Ole Tipis
- Succeeded by: Joshua Mulanda Angatia

4th Vice President of Kenya
- In office 14 October 1978 – 24 March 1988
- President: Daniel Arap Moi
- Preceded by: Daniel Arap Moi
- Succeeded by: Josephat Karanja

2nd Minister for Finance
- In office 1969–1982
- President: Daniel Arap Moi; Jomo Kenyatta
- Preceded by: James Gichuru
- Succeeded by: Arthur Magugu

Member of the National Assembly
- In office 1974 – 28 March 2013
- Preceded by: King'ori Muhiukia
- Succeeded by: Mary Wambui
- Constituency: Othaya
- In office 1963–1974
- Preceded by: Constituency established
- Succeeded by: James Muriuki
- Constituency: Doonholm

Personal details
- Born: Emilio Stanley Mwai Kibaki; 15 November 1931 Gatuyaini, British Kenya
- Died: 21 April 2022 (aged 90) Nairobi, Kenya
- Party: Party of National Unity (2007–13); Democratic Party (1992–2007); KANU (1963–92)
- Spouse: Lucy Muthoni (m. 1961; died 2016)
- Children: 4
- Education: University of East Africa; Makerere College (BA); London School of Economics (BSc)

Emilio Stanley Mwai Kibaki (15 November 1931 – 21 April 2022) was a Kenyan politician who served as the third President of Kenya from December 2002 until April 2013. He served in various leadership positions in Kenya's government including being the longest serving Member of Parliament (MP) in Kenya from 1963 to 2013. He was the fourth Vice-President of Kenya for ten years from 1978 to 1988 under President Daniel arap Moi. He also held cabinet positions in the governments of Jomo Kenyatta and Daniel arap Moi, serving as Minister for Finance (1969–1981) under Kenyatta, Minister for Home Affairs (1982–1988) and Minister for Health (1988–1991) under Moi.

Kibaki served as an opposition Member of Parliament from 1992 to 2002. He unsuccessfully ran for the presidency in 1992 and 1997. He served as the Leader of the Official Opposition in Parliament from 1998 to 2002. Following the 2002 presidential election, he was elected as the President of Kenya.

As president of Kenya, Kibaki presided over a period of significant economic growth, infrastructural development, and institutional reforms. His administration introduced free primary education in 2003, expanded access to schooling for numerous Kenyan children. Under his leadership, Kenya experienced improvements in road networks, telecommunications, and public service delivery, while the country also adopted a new constitution in 2010 that introduced far reaching political and governance reforms. However, his presidency was also marked by the disputed 2007 presidential election and the post election violence that followed, resulting in the deaths and displacement of thousands of people. Despite these challenges, Kibaki is widely regarded as one of Kenya's most influential leaders due to his contributions to economic recovery, constitutional transformation, and national development.

== Early life and education ==
Kibaki was born on 15 November 1931 in Gatuyaini village, Othaya division of Kenya's then Nyeri District (now Nyeri County). He was the youngest son of Kikuyu peasants Kibaki Gĩthĩnji and Teresia Wanjikũ. Though baptised as Emilio Stanley by Italian missionaries in his youth, he has been known as Mwai Kibaki throughout his public life. Kibaki started his schooling at the village school in Gatuyaini, where he completed two years. He then continued his education at the Karima mission school, close to Othaya town, before moving to Mathari School (now Nyeri High School) between 1944 and 1946. In addition to his academic studies, he learned carpentry and masonry at the school. After Karima Primary and Nyeri Boarding primary schools, he proceeded to Mang'u High School, where he studied between 1947 and 1950, gaining the highest grade in his O Level examinations.

In his last year at Mang'u, Kibaki briefly considered enlisting in the army, but this ambition was thwarted when Kenya's Chief colonial secretary, Walter Coutts, prohibited members of Kikuyu, Embu, and Meru communities from joining the military. Kibaki instead attended Makerere University in Kampala, Uganda, where he studied economics, history, and political science. He graduated with a first class honours degree in economics. After graduation, Kibaki remained in Uganda, working for the Shell Company of East Africa. He then earned a scholarship entitling him to undertake postgraduate studies at any British university. He chose the London School of Economics, from which he obtained a BSc in public finance, with distinction. In 1958, he went back to Makerere, where he taught as an assistant lecturer in the economics department until 1961. In 1961, Kibaki married Lucy Muthoni, the daughter of a church minister, who was then a secondary school head teacher.

== Political career prior to presidency ==
=== 1960–2002 ===
In early 1960, Mwai Kibaki left academia for active politics by giving up his job at Makerere and returning to Kenya to become an executive officer of Kenya African National Union (KANU), at the request of Thomas Joseph Mboya (who was the secretary general of KANU). Kibaki then helped to draft Kenya's independence constitution.

In 1963, Kibaki was elected as Member of Parliament for the Doonholm Constituency (subsequently called Bahati and now known as Makadara) in Nairobi. His election was the start of a long political career. In 1963 Kibaki was appointed the Permanent Secretary for the Treasury. Appointed Assistant Minister of Finance and chairman of the Economic Planning Commission in 1963, he was promoted to Minister of Commerce and Industry in 1966. In 1969, he became Minister of Finance and Economic Planning where he served until 1982.

In 1974, Kibaki, facing serious competition for his Doonholm Constituency seat from an opponent Mrs. Jael Mbogo, whom he had only narrowly and controversially beaten for the seat in the 1969 elections, moved his political base from Nairobi to his rural home, Othaya, where he was subsequently elected as Member of Parliament. The same year Time magazine rated him among the top 100 people in the world who had the potential to lead. He was re-elected Member of Parliament for Othaya in the subsequent elections of 1979, 1983, 1988, 1992, 1997, 2002, and 2007.

When Daniel arap Moi succeeded Jomo Kenyatta as President of Kenya in 1978, Kibaki was elevated to the Vice Presidency, and kept the Finance portfolio until Moi changed his ministerial portfolio from Finance to Home Affairs in 1982. He had in 1978 rejected an offer to become World Bank Vice President for Africa instead choosing to further his political career. As of 2023, he is still regarded as one of the most effective and consequential finance ministers of the Republic of Kenya. Later as President, he kept close tabs with the treasury and directly influenced key economic policies resulting in steady economic growth. Kibaki fell out of favor with President Moi in March 1988, and was dropped as vice president and moved to the Ministry of Health.

Kibaki's political style during these years was described as gentlemanly and non-confrontational. This style exposed him to criticism that he was a spineless, or even cowardly, politician who never took a stand: according to one joke, "He never saw a fence he didn't sit on". Similarly, Kenneth Matiba also referred to him as "General Kiguoya" for refusing to resign the Kanu government and join the opposition after he was dropped as vice president in 1988. 'Kiguoya' translates to the 'fearful one' in the Kikuyu language. He also, as the political circumstances of the time dictated, projected himself as a loyal stalwart of the ruling single party, KANU. In the months before multi-party politics were introduced in 1992, he declared that agitating for multi-party democracy and trying to dislodge KANU from power was like "trying to cut down a fig tree with a razor blade".

It was therefore with great surprise that the country received the news of Kibaki's resignation from government and leaving KANU on Christmas Day in December 1991, only days after the repeal of Section 2A of the then Constitution of Kenya, which restored the multi-party system of government. Soon after his resignation, Kibaki founded the Democratic Party (DP) and entered the presidential race in the upcoming multi-party elections of 1992. Kibaki was regarded as one of the favourites among Moi's challengers, although his support came mainly from the Kikuyu voters as the election was fought along ethnic lines, confirming a prediction made by both Moi and political analysts at the beginning of multipartyism.

Kibaki came third in the subsequent presidential elections of 1992, when the divided opposition lost to president Moi and KANU despite having received more than two-thirds of the vote. He then came second to Moi in the 1997 elections, when again, Moi beat a divided opposition to retain the presidency. Kibaki joined third-placed Raila Odinga in accusing the president of rigging the poll, and both opposition leaders boycotted Moi's swearing in for his fifth term in office.

=== 2002 elections ===
In preparation for the 2002 elections, Kibaki's Democratic Party affiliated with several other opposition parties to form the National Alliance of Kenya (NAK). A group of disappointed KANU presidential aspirants then quit KANU in protest after being overlooked by outgoing President Moi when Moi had Uhuru Kenyatta (founding Father Jomo Kenyatta's son and Kibaki's successor as Kenya's 4th President after the 2013 General Election) nominated to be the KANU presidential candidate, and hurriedly formed the Liberal Democratic Party (LDP). NAK later combined with the LDP to form the National Rainbow Coalition (NARC). On 14 October 2002, at a large opposition rally in Uhuru Park, Nairobi, Kibaki was nominated the NARC opposition alliance presidential candidate after Raila Odinga made the declaration; "Kibaki Tosha!" (Swahili for "Kibaki [is] enough")

On 3 December 2002, Kibaki was injured in a road accident while on his way back to Nairobi from a campaign meeting at Machakos junction 40 kilometres (25 miles) from Nairobi. He was subsequently hospitalized in Nairobi, then London, after sustaining fracture injuries in the accident. After the accident, he had to move using a wheel chair up to months later after his presidency. For the remainder of his life, he walked rather awkwardly as a result of those injuries.

The rest of his presidential campaign was thus conducted by his NARC colleagues in his absence, led by Raila Odinga and Kijana Wamalwa (who went on to become the Vice President) who campaigned tirelessly for Kibaki after stating, "The captain has been injured in the field... but the rest of the team shall continue." On 27 December 2002, Kibaki and NARC won a landslide victory over KANU, with Kibaki getting 62% of the votes in the presidential elections, against only 31% for the KANU candidate Uhuru Kenyatta.

== Presidency ==
Presidential Standard of Mwai Kibaki

=== Swearing in ===
On 30 December 2002, still nursing injuries from the motor vehicle accident and in a wheel chair, Kibaki was sworn in as the third President and Commander in Chief of the Armed Forces of the Republic of Kenya, where thousands of cheering supporters at the historic Uhuru Park within Nairobi City. At his inauguration, he stressed his opposition to government corruption, saying:

"Government will no longer be run on the whims of individuals."

Kibaki's swearing in marked the end of four decades of KANU rule, the party having ruled Kenya since independence. Moi, who had been in power for 24 years, began his retirement.

=== Leadership style ===
President Kibaki's style was that of a quiet, publicity-averse, but highly intelligent and competent technocrat.

Unlike his predecessors, he never tried to establish a personality cult; never had his portrait on every unit of Kenya's currency; never had all manner of streets, places, and institutions named after him; never had state sanctioned praise songs composed in his honour; never dominated news bulletins with reports of his presidential activities - however routine or mundane; and never engaged in the populist sloganeering of his predecessors.

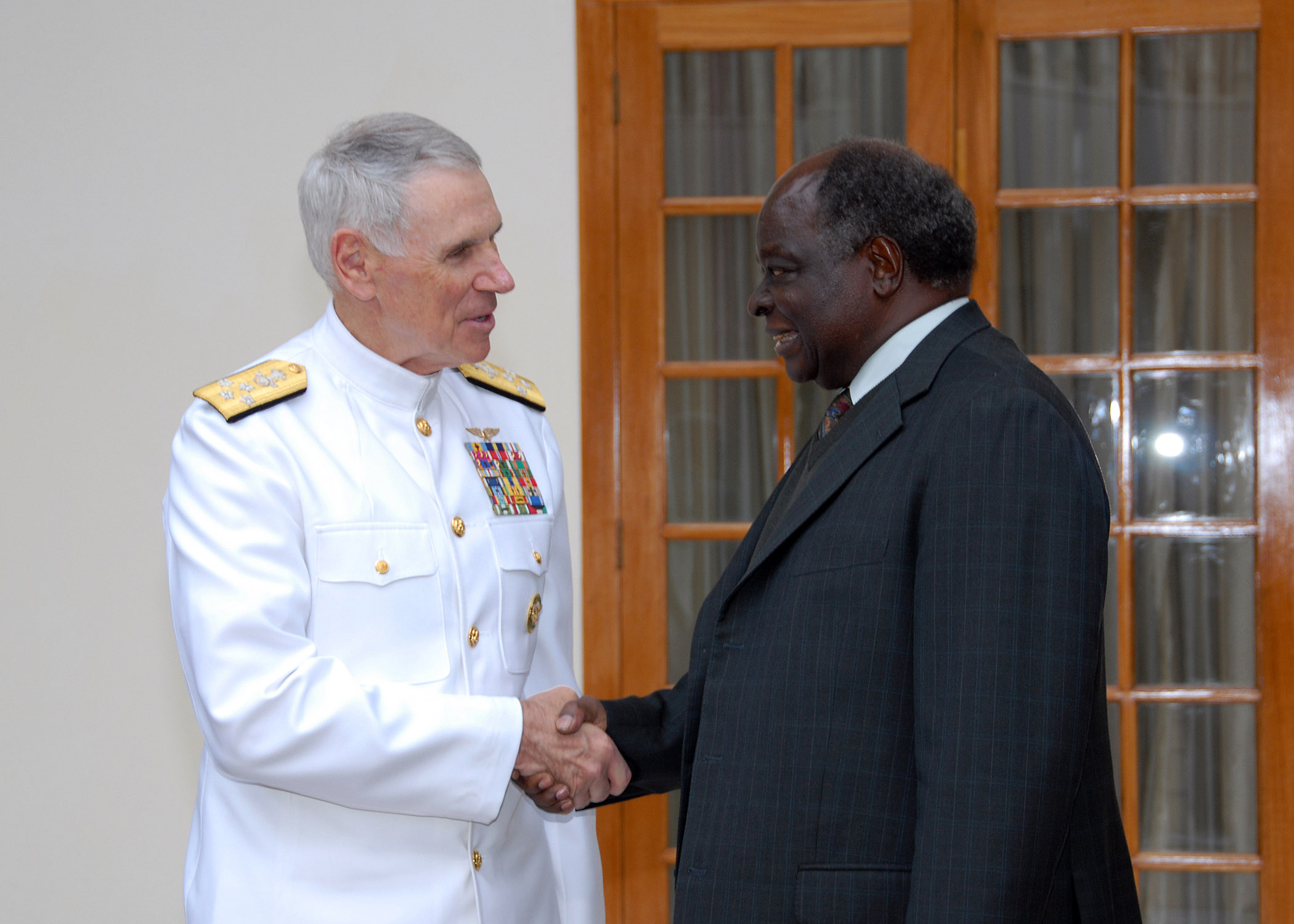
President Mwai Kibaki meets with Adm. William J. Fallon, Commander of U.S. Central Command.

His style of leadership gave him the image of a seemingly aloof, withdrawn technocrat or intellectual and made him seem out of touch with the street, and his seemingly hands-off leadership-by-delegation style made his governments, especially at the cabinet level, appear dysfunctional.

=== First term health issues ===
It is widely acknowledged that his age and the 2002 incident changed Kibaki. He became less witty, sporty, and eloquent than he was before. Kibaki was a man who would make lengthy and flowery contributions on the Parliament floor without notes, but he became limited to reading prepared speeches at every forum, unlike his formerly witty self.

In late January 2003, it was announced that the President had been admitted to Nairobi Hospital to have a blood clot– the after-effect of his car accident– removed from his leg. He came out of hospital and addressed the public outside the hospital on TV in a visibly incoherent manner, and speculation after that was that he had suffered a stroke, his second, the first being said to have occurred sometimes in the 1970s. His subsequent ill health greatly diminished his performance during his first term and the affairs of government during that time are said to have been largely run by a group of loyal aides, both in and out of government. Kibaki did not seem well, for instance, when he appeared live on TV on 25 September 2003 to appoint Moody Awori Vice President after the death in office of Vice President, Michael Wamalwa Kijana.

=== 2003: Free primary education ===
In January 2003, Kibaki introduced a free primary education initiative, which brought over 1 million children who would not have been able to afford school the chance to attend. The initiative received positive attention, including praise from Bill Clinton, who met Kibaki in Kenya in July 2005. In his tenure he was involved in numerous academic events including the Equity Group Foundation, Wings to Fly 2013 scholars commissioning.

=== 2005: Constitutional referendum, the NARC fallout and government of national unity ===
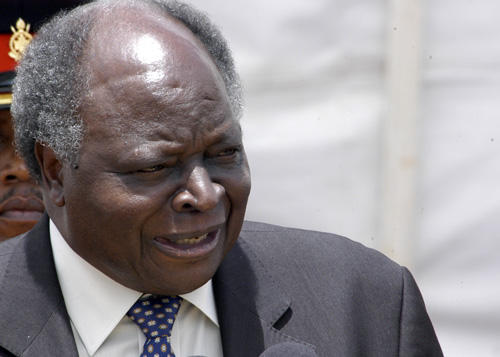
President Kibaki in 2005

The 2005 Kenyan constitutional referendum was held on 21 November 2005. The main issue of contention in the Constitution review process was how much power should be vested in the Kenyan Presidency. In previous drafts, those who feared a concentration of power in the president added provisions for European-style power-sharing between a ceremonial President elected via universal suffrage and an executive Prime Minister elected by Parliament. The draft presented by Attorney General Amos Wako for the referendum retained sweeping powers for the Presidency.

Though Kibaki supported the proposal, some members of his own cabinet, mainly from the Liberal Democratic Party (LDP) wing led by Raila Odinga, allied with the main opposition party KANU to mobilize a powerful NO campaign that resulted in a majority of 58% of voters rejecting the draft.

As a consequence of, and immediately after, the referendum loss, on 23 November 2005, Kibaki dismissed his entire cabinet in the middle of his administration's term, with the aim of purging all Raila-allied ministers from the cabinet. About his decision Kibaki said;

"Following the results of the referendum, it has become necessary for me, as the President of the Republic, to re-organize my government to make it more cohesive and better able to serve the people of Kenya".

The only members of the cabinet office to be spared a midterm exit were the Vice President and Minister of Home Affairs, Moody Awori, and the Attorney General whose position is constitutionally protected. A new cabinet of Kibaki loyalists, including MP's from the opposition, termed the Government of National Unity (GNU), was thereafter appointed, but some MP's who were offered ministerial positions declined to take up posts.

A report by a Kenyan Commission of Inquiry, the Waki Commission, contextualises some issues. They reported that Kibaki, after agreeing to an informal Memorandum of Understanding (MoU) to create the post of Prime Minister, reneged on this pact after being elected. They cited criticism of Kibaki neglecting his pre-election agreement, leaving the public to identify it as an attempt by the Kibaki Government to "keep power to itself rather than share it".

=== 2007: Elections ===
On 26 January 2007, President Kibaki declared his intention of running for re-election in the 2007 presidential election. On 16 September 2007, Kibaki announced that he would stand as the candidate of a new alliance incorporating all the parties who supported his re-election, called the Party of National Unity. The parties in his alliance included the much diminished former ruling KANU, DP, Narc-Kenya, Ford-Kenya, Ford People, and Shirikisho.

Kibaki's main opponent, Raila Odinga, had used the referendum victory to launch the ODM, which nominated him as its presidential candidate for the 2007 elections.

On 30 September 2007, President Kibaki launched his presidential campaign at Nyayo Stadium, Nairobi.

Kalonzo Musyoka then broke away from Raila's ODM to mount his own fringe bid for the presidency, thus narrowing down the contest between the main candidates, Kibaki, the incumbent, and Odinga. Opinion polls up to election day showed Kibaki behind Raila Odinga nationally, but closing. On regional analysis, the polls showed him behind Raila in all regions of the country except Central Province, Embu, and Meru, where he was projected to take most of the votes, and behind Kalonzo Musyoka in Kalonzo's native Ukambani.

=== 2007–2008: Results dispute and post-election violence ===
Three days later, after a protracted count which saw presidential results in Kibaki's Central Kenya come in last, allegedly inflated, in a cloud of suspicion and rising tensions, amid vehement protests by Raila's ODM, overnight re-tallying of results and chaotic scenes, all beamed live on TV, at the national tallying center at the Kenyatta International Conference Center in Nairobi, riot police eventually sealed off the tallying Center ahead of the result announcement, evicted party agents, observers, and the media, and moved the Chairman of the Electoral Commission, Samuel Kivuitu, to another room where Kivuitu went on to declare Kibaki the winner by 4,584,721 votes to Odinga's 4,352,993, placing Kibaki ahead of Odinga by about 232,000 votes in the hotly contested election with Kalonzo Musyoka a distant third.

One hour later, in a hastily convened dusk ceremony, Kibaki was sworn in at the grounds of State House, Nairobi for his second term, defiantly calling for the "verdict of the people" to be respected and for "healing and reconciliation" to begin. Tension arose and led to protests by a huge number of Kenyans who felt that Kibaki had refused to respect the verdict of the people and was now forcibly remaining in office.

Immediately the results were announced, Odinga bitterly accused Kibaki of electoral fraud. Odinga's allegations scored with his supporters, and seemed meritorious since the results had defied pre-election polls and expectations and election day exit polls. Furthermore, Odinga, who had campaigned against the concentration of political power in the hands of Kikuyu politicians, had won the votes of most of the other Kenyan tribes and regions, with Kibaki's victory being attained only with the near exclusive support of the populous Kikuyu, Meru, and Embu communities-who had turned out to vote for Kibaki in large numbers after feeling, in reaction to the Odinga campaign, and with the covert encouragement of the Kibaki campaign, increasingly besieged and threatened by the pro-Odinga tribes. Moreover, ODM had won the most parliamentary and local authority seats by a wide margin. A joint statement by the British Foreign Office and Department for International Development cited "real concerns" over irregularities, while international observers refused to declare the election free and fair. The European Union chief observer, Alexander Graf Lambsdorff, cited one constituency where his monitors saw official results for Kibaki that were 25,000 votes lower than the figure subsequently announced by the Electoral Commission, leading him to doubt the accuracy of the announced results.

It was reported that Kibaki, who had previously been perceived as an "old-school gentleman", had "revealed a steely side" when he swore himself in within an hour of being announced the victor of the highly contested election—one where the results were largely in question. Odinga's supporters said he would be declared president at a rival ceremony on Monday, but police banned the event. Koki Muli, the head of local watchdog, the Institute of Education in Democracy, said called the day the "saddest...in the history of democracy in this country" and "a coup d'etat."

Opposition supporters saw the result as a plot by Kibaki's Kikuyu tribe, Kenya's largest, to keep power by any means. The tribes that lost the election were upset at the prospect of five years without political power, and anti-Kikuyu sentiment swelled, spawning the 2007–2008 Kenyan crisis, as violence broke out in several places in the country, started by the ODM supporters protesting the "stealing" of their "victory", and subsequently escalating as the targeted Kikuyus retaliated. As unrest spread, television and radio stations were instructed to stop all live broadcasts. There was widespread theft, vandalism, looting, destruction of property, and a significant number of atrocities, killings, and sexual violence reported.

The violence continued for more than two months, as Kibaki ruled with "half" a cabinet he had appointed, with Odinga and ODM refusing to recognize him as president.

When the election was eventually investigated by the Independent Review Commission (IREC) on the 2007 Elections chaired by Justice Johann Kriegler, it was found that there were too many electoral malpractices from several regions perpetrated by all the contesting parties to conclusively establish which candidate won the December 2007 Presidential elections. Such malpractices included widespread bribery, vote buying, intimidation, and ballot stuffing by both sides, as well as incompetence from the Electoral Commission of Kenya (ECK), which was shortly thereafter disbanded by the new Parliament.

=== 2008: National accord and Grand Coalition Government ===
The country was only saved by the mediation of United Nations Secretary-General Kofi Annan with a panel of "Eminent African Personalities" backed by the African Union, the United States, and the United Kingdom.

Following the mediation, a deal, called the national accord, was signed in February 2008 between Raila Odinga and Kibaki, now referred to as the "two Principals". The accord, later passed by the Kenyan Parliament as the National Accord and Reconciliation Act 2008 provided among other things for power-sharing, with Kibaki remaining President and Raila Odinga taking a newly re-created post of Prime Minister.

On 17 April 2008, Raila Odinga was sworn in as Prime Minister of Kenya, along with a power-sharing Cabinet, with 42 ministers and 50 assistant ministers, Kenya's largest ever. The cabinet was fifty percent Kibaki appointed ministers and fifty percent Raila appointed ministers, and was in reality a carefully balanced ethnic coalition. The arrangement, which also included Kalonzo Musyoka as vice president, was known as the "Grand Coalition Government".

=== Economic legacy: turnaround ===
The Kibaki presidency set itself the main task of reviving and turning round country after years of stagnation and economic mismanagement during the Moi tenure – a feat faced with several challenges, including the aftermath of the Nyayo Era (Moi Presidency), western donor fatigue, the President's ill health during his first term, political tension culminating in the break-up of the NARC coalition, the 2007–2008 post election violence, the 2008 financial crisis, and a tenuous relationship with his coalition partner, Raila Odinga, during his second term.

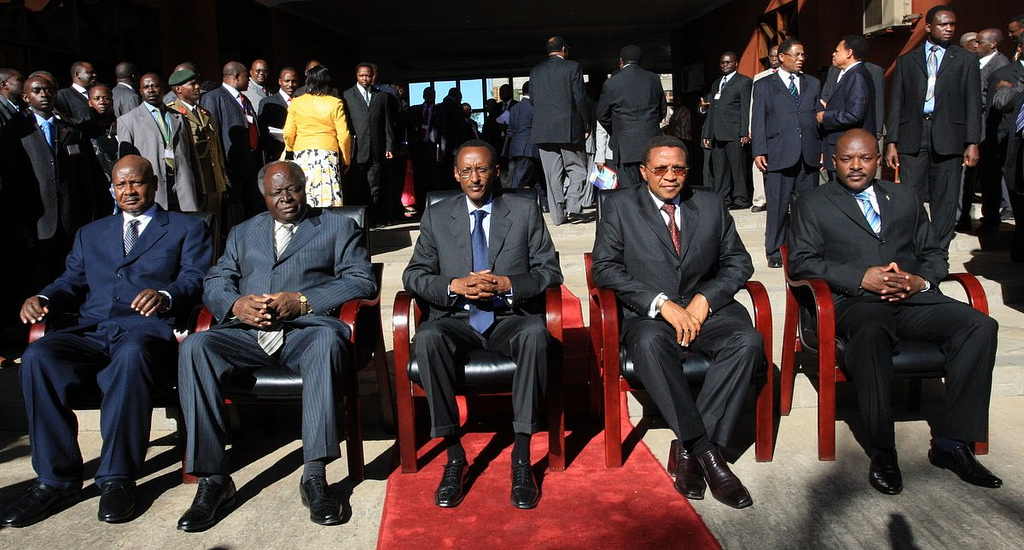
President Mwai Kibaki with, from left to right, Presidents Yoweri Museveni of Uganda, Paul Kagame of Rwanda, Jakaya Kikwete of Tanzania, and Pierre Nkurunziza of Burundi at an East African Community Head of States Meeting

President Kibaki, the economist whose term as Finance minister in the 1970s is widely celebrated as outstanding, did much as president to repair the damage done to the country's economy during the 24-year reign of his predecessor, President Moi. Compared to the Moi years, Kenya was much better managed, by far more competent public sector personnel, and was much transformed.

Kenya's economy in the Kibaki years experienced a major turnaround. GDP growth picked up from a low 0.6% (real −1.6%) in 2002 to 3% in 2003, 4.9% in 2004, 5.8% in 2005, 6% in 2006, and 7% in 2007, then dropped to 1.7% in 2008 (due to the 2008 financial crisis), 2.6% in 2009, but recovered to 5% in 2010 and 5% in 2011.

Development was resumed in all areas of the country, including the hitherto neglected and largely undeveloped semi-arid or arid north. Many sectors of the economy recovered from total collapse pre-2003. Numerous state corporations that had collapsed during the Moi years were revived and began performing profitably. The telecommunications sector boomed. Rebuilding, modernisation, and expansion of infrastructure began in earnest, with several ambitious infrastructural and other projects, such as the Thika Superhighway, which would have been seen as unattainable during the Moi years were completed. The country's cities and towns also began being positively renewed and transformed.

The Constituency Development Fund (CDF) was also introduced in 2003. The fund was designed to support constituency-level, grass-root development projects. It was aimed to achieve equitable distribution of development resources across regions and to control imbalances in regional development brought about by partisan politics. It targeted all constituency-level development projects, particularly those aiming to combat poverty at the grassroots. The CDF programme has facilitated the putting up of new water, health, and education facilities in all parts of the country including remote areas that were usually overlooked during funds allocation in national budgets. CDF was the first step towards the devolved system of government introduced by the 2010 Constitution, by which Local Government structures were Constitutionally redesigned, enhanced, and strengthened.

President Kibaki also oversaw the creation of Kenya's Vision 2030, a long-term development plan aimed at raising GDP growth to 10% annually and transforming Kenya into a middle income country by 2030, which he unveiled on 30 October 2006.

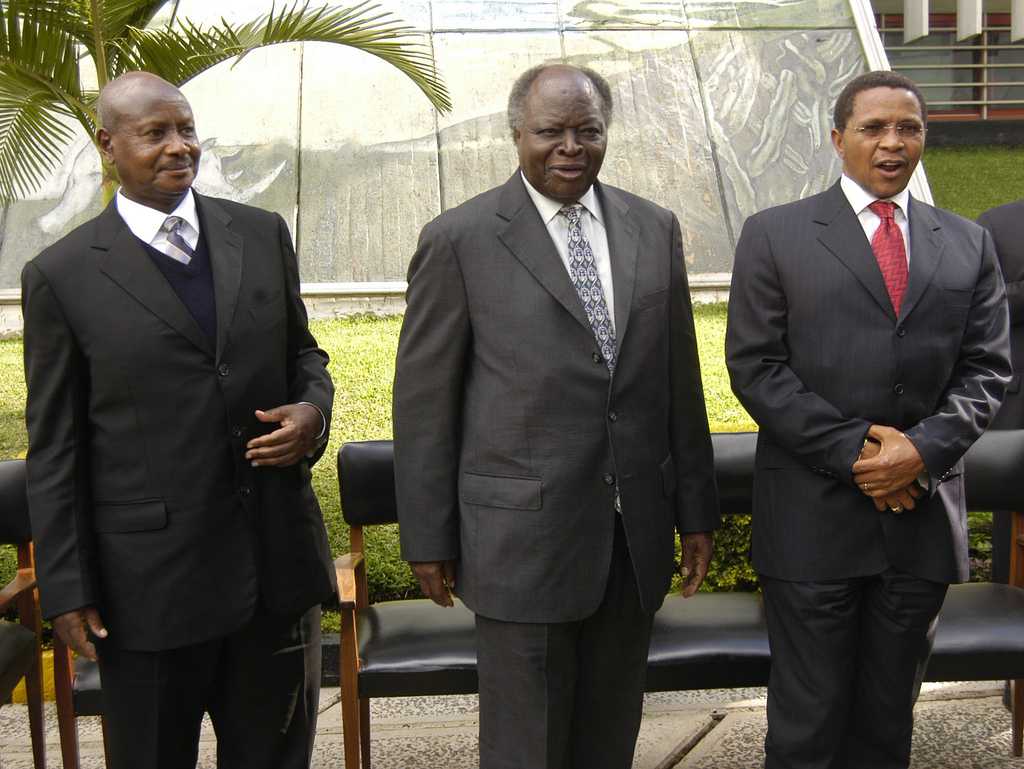
President Mwai Kibaki with, from left to right, Ugandan President Yoweri Museveni and Tanzanian President Jakaya Kikwete during the 8th EAC summit in Arusha

The Kibaki regime also saw a reduction of Kenya's dependence on western donor aid, with the country being increasingly funded by internally generated resources such as increased tax revenue collection. Relations with the People's Republic of China, Japan, and other non-western powers improved and expanded remarkably in the Kibaki years. The People's Republic of China and Japan especially, the Asian Tigers such as Malaysia and Singapore, Brazil, the Middle East and to a lesser extent, South Africa, Libya, other African Countries, and even Iran, became increasingly important economic partners.

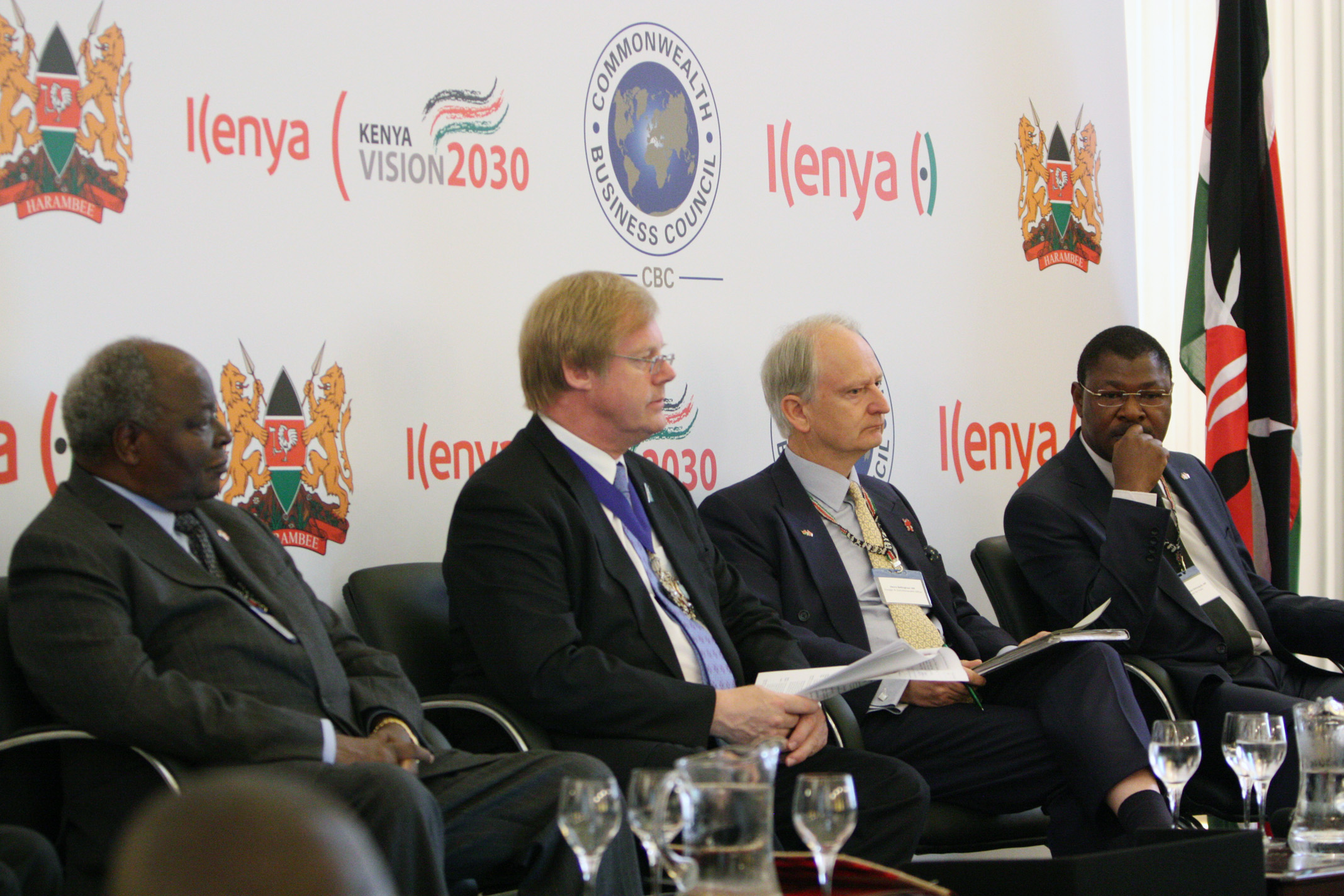
President Mwai Kibaki with the British Foreign Office Minister Henry Bellingham, Lord Mayor of the City of London, Alderman David Wootton and Minister of Trade Moses Wetangula at the Kenya Investment Conference in London, 31 July 2012

=== Political legacy ===
President Kibaki was accused of ruling with a small group of his elderly peers, mainly from the educated side of the Kikuyu elite that emerged in the Jomo Kenyatta era, usually referred to as the "Kitchen Cabinet" or the "Mount Kenya Mafia". There was therefore the perception that his was a Kikuyu presidency. This perception was reinforced when the President was seen to have trashed the pre- 2002 election Memorandum of Understanding with the Raila Odinga-led Liberal Democratic Party, and was further reinforced by his disputed 2007 election victory over the Raila Odinga led ODM Party being achieved nearly exclusively with the votes of the populous Mt. Kenya Kikuyu, Meru and Embu communities.

The Commission of Inquiry into Post Election Violence (CIPEV) put it thus:

The post election violence [in early 2008 therefore is, in part, a consequence of the failure of President Kibaki and his first Government to exert political control over the country or to maintain sufficient legitimacy as would have allowed a civilised contest with him at the polls to be possible. Kibaki's regime failed to unite the country, and allowed feelings of marginalisation to fester into what became the post election violence. He and his then Government were complacent in the support they considered they would receive in any election from the majority Kikuyu community and failed to heed the views of the legitimate leaders of other communities.

Critics noted that President Kibaki failed to take advantage of the 2002 popular mandate for a complete break with the past and fix the politics largely mobilized along ethnic interests. "... when we achieved and the new world dawned, the old men came out again and took our victory to re-make in the likeness of the former world they knew." Elected in 2002 on a reform platform, Kibaki was seen to have re-established the status quo ante. His opponents charged that a major aim of his presidency was the preservation of the privileged position of the elite that emerged during the Kenyatta years, of which he was part.

In summary, the Kibaki Presidency did not do nearly enough to address the problem of tribalism in Kenya.

Lawyer George Kegoro, in an article published in the Daily Nation newspaper on 12 April 2013 summarized the Kibaki Political Legacy thus:-

"Kibaki was, by far, a better manager of the economy than Moi before him. He brought order to the management of public affairs, a departure from the rather informal style that characterised the Moi regime. Kibaki's push for free primary education remains an important achievement, as will the revival of key economic institutions such as the Kenya Meat Commission and the Kenya Cooperative Creameries, ruined during the Moi-era. ... However, Kibaki was not all success. Having come to power in 2003 on an anti-corruption platform, he set up two commissions, the Bosire Commission on the Goldenberg scandal and the Ndung'u Commission, which investigated irregular land allocation. However, the reports were not implemented. Further, the Kibaki administration was rocked by a corruption scandal of its own, the Anglo Leasing scam, involving his close associates. John Githongo, an inspired appointment by Kibaki for an anti-corruption czar, resigned from the government in 2005, citing lack of support from the president. As he leaves office, therefore, the fight against corruption remains unfulfilled. ... But, perhaps, the most controversial aspect of the Kibaki tenure will always be his relationship with senior politicians of his day, particularly Raila Odinga and Kalonzo Musyoka. The context of this complex relationship includes the post-election violence of 2007, whose roots go back to the dishonoured Memorandum of Understanding between Kibaki and Raila in 2002. The quarrel over the MoU directly led to the break-up of the Narc government, after which Kibaki showed Odinga the door and invited the opposition to rule with him. The effect was that the opposition, rejected at the polls, joined government while Raila's faction, validly elected to power, was consigned to the opposition. ... To the supporters of Raila and Kalonzo, Kibaki will be remembered as a person who did not keep political promises."

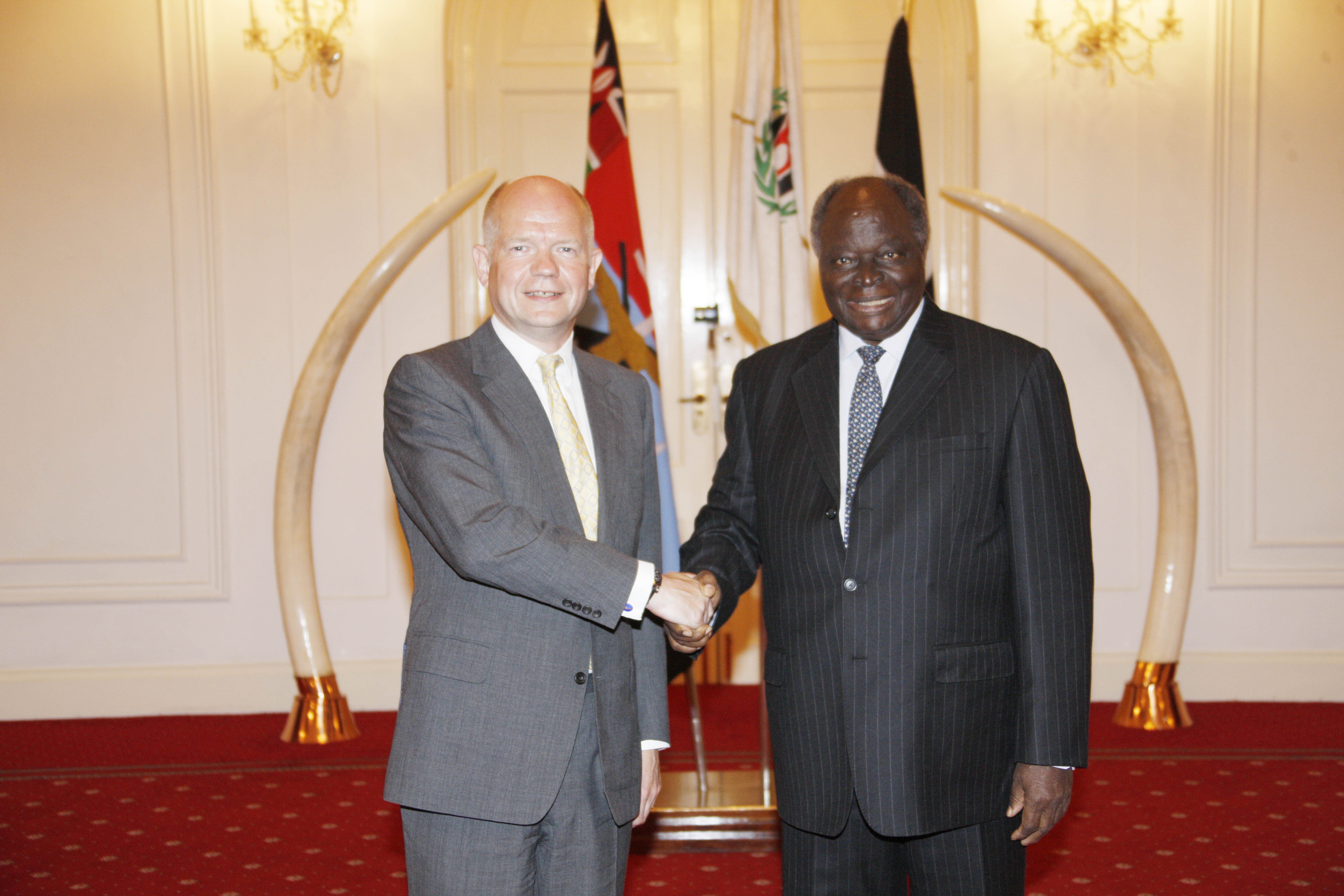
President Mwai Kibaki with British Foreign Secretary William Hague in Nairobi, Kenya

=== Failure to tame corruption ===
Though President Kibaki was never personally accused of corruption, and managed to virtually end the grabbing of public land rampant in the Moi and Kenyatta eras, he was unable to adequately contain Kenya's widely entrenched culture of endemic corruption.

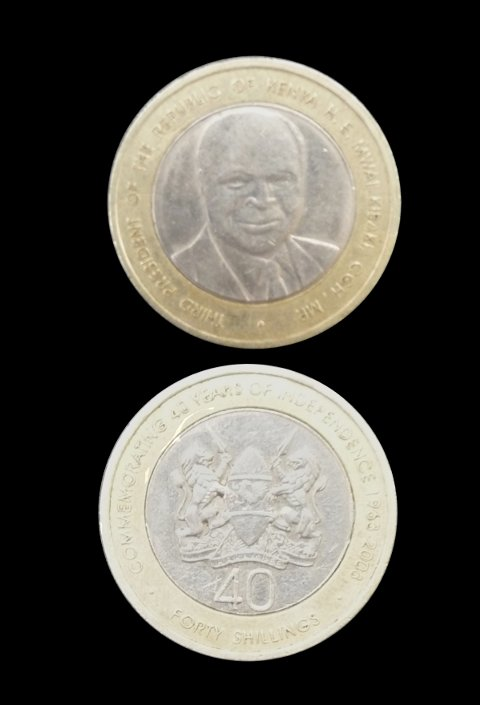
The forty shilling coin with President Mwai Kibaki's portrait and inscription commemorating 40 Years of Independence

Michela Wrong describes the situation thus:

"Whether expressed in the petty bribes the average Kenyan had to pay each week to fat-bellied policemen and local councillors, the jobs for the boys doled out by civil servants and politicians on strictly tribal lines, or the massive scams perpetrated by the country's ruling elite, corruption had become endemic. 'Eating', as Kenyans dubbed the gorging on state resources by the well-connected, had crippled the nation. In the corruption indices drawn up by the anti-graft organisation Transparency International, Kenya routinely trail[s] near the bottom ... viewed as only slightly less sleazy than Nigeria or Pakistan ..."

The Daily Nation, in an article published on 4 March 2013 titled "End of a decade of highs and lows for Mwai Kibaki" summarised it thus:

For a leader who was popularly swept into power in 2002 on an anti-corruption platform, Kibaki's tenure saw graft scandals where hundreds of millions of shillings were siphoned from public coffers. Kibaki's National Rainbow Coalition – which took power from the authoritarian rule of Daniel arap Moi—was welcomed for its promises of change and economic growth, but soon showed that it was better suited to treading established paths.

The initial response to corruption was very solid ... but it became clear after a while that these scams reached all the way to the president himself," said Kenya's former anti-corruption chief John Githongo in Michela Wrong's book It's Our Turn to Eat. Most notorious of a raft of graft scandals was the multi-billion shilling Anglo Leasing case, which emerged in 2004 and involved public cash being paid to a complicated web of foreign companies for a range of services—including naval ships and passports—that never materialised."

=== 2010 Constitution ===
The passage of Kenya's transformative 2010 Constitution, championed by President Kibaki in the Kenyan constitutional referendum in 2010 was a major triumph and achievement, which went a long way into addressing Kenya's governance and institutional challenges. With the new Constitution started wide-ranging institutional and legislative reforms, which President Kibaki successfully steered in the final years of this presidency."His greatest moment was the promulgation of the new Constitution... It was a very deep and emotional moment for him," Kibaki's son Jimmy was quoted as saying.

=== 2013: Power handover ===
Kibaki handed over the Kenyan presidency to his successor, Uhuru Kenyatta, on 9 April 2013 at a public inauguration ceremony held at Kenya's largest stadium. "I am happy to pass the torch of leadership to the new generation of leaders", said Kibaki. He also thanked his family and all Kenyans for the support they had given him throughout his tenure in office, and cited the various achievements his government made.

The handover marked the end of his presidency and of his 50 years of public service.

== Personal life ==
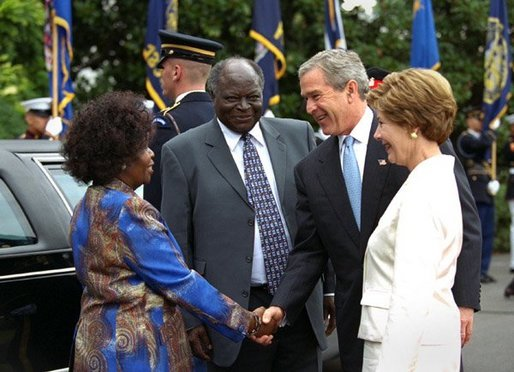
President Kibaki and Mrs. Lucy Kibaki with U.S. President George W. Bush and Laura Bush at the White House during a state visit in 2003

Kibaki was married to Lucy Muthoni from 1961 until her death in 2016. They had four children: Judy Wanjiku, Jimmy Kibaki, David Kagai, and Tony Githinji. They also had several grandchildren: Joy Jamie Marie, Rachael Muthoni, Mwai Junior, and Krystinaa Muthoni. Jimmy Kibaki has declared and aspired to be his father's political heir, though he has been unsuccessful in that endeavor so far.

In 2004, the media reported that Kibaki had a second spouse, whom he allegedly married under customary law, Mary Wambui, and a daughter, Wangui Mwai. State House in response released an unsigned statement that Kibaki's only immediate family at the time was his then wife, Lucy, and their four children. In 2009, Kibaki, with Lucy in close attendance, held a press conference to re-state publicly that he only had one wife. The matter of Kibaki's alleged mistress, and his wife's public reactions, were seen as embarrassing by the press, with the Washington Post terming the scandal as a "new Kenyan soap opera".

Wambui enjoyed the state trappings of a presidential spouse and became a powerful and wealthy business-woman during the Kibaki Presidency. During the scandal, Lucy had several public moments of frustration at the situation. Ms. Wambui, despite opposition from Kibaki's family, led publicly by Kibaki's son, Jimmy, and despite Kibaki's public endorsement and campaign for her opponent, succeeded Kibaki as Member of Parliament for Othaya in the 2013 General Election. In December 2014, Senator Bonny Khalwale stated on KTN's Jeff Koinange Live that President Kibaki had introduced Wambui as his wife.

Kibaki enjoyed playing golf and was a member of the Muthaiga Golf Club. He was a practicing and a very committed member of the Roman Catholic Church and attended Consolata Shrines Catholic Church in Nairobi every Sunday at noon.

On 21 August 2016, Kibaki was taken to Karen Hospital, and later flew to South Africa for specialized treatment. Unlike the Kenyatta and Moi families, Kibaki's family has shown little interest in politics save for his nephew Nderitu Muriithi, Governor of Laikipia County, from 2017 to 2022.

== Death ==
Kibaki died on 21 April 2022, at the age of 90. His death was announced by President Uhuru Kenyatta, who issued a proclamation that Kibaki would be granted a state funeral with full civilian and military honors and declared a period of national mourning with flags flying at half-mast until President Mwai Kibaki was buried.

On 25 April 2022, his body was taken to Parliament buildings on a military gun carriage to offset the lying in state component of his state funeral. President Uhuru Kenyatta and First Lady wife Margaret Kenyatta led Kenyans in viewing the body. His body was laid on a catafalque bearing the colour of his presidential standard at the Speaker's way and dressed in his trademark pin-striped suits. His body was also guarded by four Kenya Defence Forces colonels changing shifts after two hours. The lying in state continued until 27 April 2022 ahead of funeral service held at Nyayo National Stadium on 29 April 2022 which was attended by key dignitaries including some sitting presidents. He was finally interred at his Othaya home in Nyeri County on 30 April 2022 with full military honors after a church service held by the Catholic church at Othaya approved school. The honors included the Last Post and The Long Reveille bugle cry, a 19 gun salute and The Missing Man formation fly past. South Sudan declared three days of mourning; Tanzania declared two days of mourning.

== Honours and awards ==
- Chief of the Order of the Golden Heart of Kenya (C.G.H.)

=== Honorary degrees ===
University	Country	Honour	Year
University of Nairobi	Kenya	Doctor of Letters	2004
Jomo Kenyatta University of Agriculture and Technology	Kenya	Doctor of Science	?
Masinde Muliro University of Science and Technology	Kenya	Doctor of Science	2008
University of Nairobi	Kenya	Doctor of Laws	2008
Kenyatta University	Kenya	Doctor of Education	2010
Makerere University	Uganda	Doctor of Laws	2012
Dedan Kimathi University of Technology	Kenya	Doctor of Humane Letters	2013

Political offices
Preceded by Daniel arap Moi	Vice President of Kenya; 1978–1988	Succeeded by Josephat Karanja
Preceded by Daniel arap Moi	President of Kenya; 2002–2013	Succeeded by Uhuru Kenyatta
