= Kenya Human Rights Commission =

Non-governmental organisation

- Formation: 1992
- Type: nongovernmental organisation
- Purpose: Promote human rights
- Location: Nairobi, Kenya
- Official language: English
- Chairman: Davinder Lamba
- Executive Director: Davis Malombe
- Website: www.khrc.or.ke

The Kenya Human Rights Commission (KHRC) is a non-governmental organisation founded in 1992 and registered in 1994. The Commission campaigns to create a culture in Kenya where human rights and democratic culture are entrenched. It does this through monitoring, documenting and publicising rights violations.

== Organisation ==
The KHRC relies on donations from individuals and from organisations such as the Swedish International Development Agency, Christian Aid, Trocaire, Danish International Development Agency, United Nations Development Programme, UNIFEM, Canadian International Development Agency, The Ford Foundation, and others. A board of directors provides oversight. The commission management is headed by an executive director, and programme officers are responsible for specific activities. Programs involve Advocacy, Research, Monitoring and Documentation and Media, Publicity and Communication.

The KHRC is a member organisation of the International Network for Economic, Social & Cultural Rights. The KHRC is a partner of the Centre for Research on Multinational Corporations (SOMO), a non-profit research and network organisation that works on social, ecological and economic issues related to sustainable development.

== Action plan ==
The KHRC tries to address the sustainability of the human rights movement, liberation of grassroots groups and organisations, social justice, accountability, and gender mainstreaming. The KHRC has published a roadmap for achieving human rights in Kenya based on a six-point action plan for de-ethnicising Kenyan politics, entrenching the constitution-making process in the current constitution, implementation of Transitional Justice, preserving the independence of democratic institutions, realising gender equality and equity in Kenyan society and empowering the civic commons.

== Activities ==
Founded at a time when serious human rights abuses were prevalent in Kenya, between 1992 and 1998 the KHRC focused on monitoring, documenting and publicising violations of civil and political rights. The organisation helped strengthen the role of civil society, advocated democratic reforms and helped with the constitution-making process. Between 1999 and 2003 the KHRC began working on a broader range of economic, social and cultural rights. From 2004 onward, KHRC has been focusing on helping communities understand and claim their democratic and Human Rights. In March 2004 the KHRC met with Kenya Police and the Commonwealth Human Rights Initiative to discuss a Strategic plan for Police Reforms in Kenya.

After the flawed Kenyan presidential election in December 2007 the executive director of the commission, Lynne Muthoni Wanyeki received death threats due to statements she had made about the elections. She was described as a traitor to the Kikuyu people. Wanyeki had said the Government had used public resources to support its campaign and had failed to guarantee voter security, particularly in areas hit by ethnic conflicts. The commission was compiling a comprehensive report on human rights violations during the elections. In December 2009 Muthoni Wanyeki stated that the KHRC was in favour of having the International Criminal Court (ICC) launch investigations into the post-election violence. However, human rights activists were concerned about the safety of witnesses who provided evidence to the ICC, since the government was unlikely to give them any protection.

In 2009 the KHRC filed a representative suit in the British High Court on behalf of survivors of the Mau Mau, an anti-colonialist movement, seeking reparations for abuses during the extended state of emergency between 1952 and 1960. One of the objectives was to implant the tools for comprehensive transitional justice in Kenya by addressing the problems of impunity for past abuse.

In May 2011 the commission issued a report in which it called for the government to decriminalise homosexuality. The commission stated that "LGBTI individuals in Kenya continue to be some of the most marginalized and discriminated individuals because of their real or perceived sexual orientation or gender identity." It criticized anti-gay violence and discrimination, and even was supportive of gay marriage.

== See also ==
- List of non-governmental organisations in Kenya
