= Mary Wambui =

Kenyan businesswoman (born 1965)

Mary Wambūi

Chairperson of the Board of Directiors of the Athi Water Works Development Agency
- Incumbent
- Assumed office 8 August 2025
- President: William Ruto

Chairperson of the Board of Directors of the Communications Authority of Kenya (CA)
- In office 2 December 2022 – 8 August 2025
- President: William Ruto
- Constituency: Gatundu South

Personal details
- Born: Mary Wambui; 12 December 1965 (age 60) Gatundu South, Kenya.
- Citizenship: Kenya
- Party: United Democratic Alliance

Mary Wambūi is a Kenyan businesswoman who has served as the Chairperson of the Board of Directors at the Athi Water Works Development Agency since August 8, 2025. She previously served as the Chairperson of the Board of Directors of the Communications Authority of Kenya (CA) from 2 December 2022 to August 8, 2025.
