= Liberal Democratic Party (Kenya) =

Defunct political party in Kenya

Liberal Democratic Party of Kenya
- Leader: Denise A.O Kodhe
- Founded: 2002
- Dissolved: 2005
- Succeeded by: Orange Democratic Movement; Wiper Democratic Movement – Kenya
- Ideology: Liberalism
- National affiliation: NARC

The Liberal Democratic Party was a political party in Kenya. It was established by Denise A.O Kodhe and members of the National Rainbow Coalition in 2002.

In the general election held on 27 December 2002, the party was a partner in the National Rainbow Coalition, which won 56.1% of the popular vote and 125 out of 212 elected seats. The party itself took 59 of these seats. In the presidential election held on the same day, the party supported Mwai Kibaki, who won 62.2% of the vote and was elected.

Before 2002, the party had been an insignifanct splinter group which was joined by a large number of former KANU members after the nomination of Uhuru Kenyatta to be KANU's presidential candidate. Members of the former National Democratic Party NDP of Raila Odinga which had joined KANU only in summer 2001 left the then ruling party together with KANU politicians who were opposed to what they perceived as imposition of Kenyatta as candidate by the then president Moi. After leaving KANU, they did not take the risk of attempting to register a new party under a government controlled by Moi but instead opted to join the already existing LDP which offered them a space.

LDP then teamed up with the National Alliance Party of Kenya (NAK) of Mwai Kibaki to form NARC which won the 2003 election with Kibaki as its presidential candidate.

Tensions developed soon as Kibaki did not honour a memorandum of understandíng signed between the partners in NARC and which envisaged a share of 50% of cabinet posts for LDP plus a new constitution which would curtail the power of the president and create the post of a prime minister which was to go to Odinga.

After the Kenyan constitutional referendum in 2005 LPD left the NARC-government. Instead, LDP and KANU formed a coalition known as Orange Democratic Movement, later registered as a political party, ODM-Kenya. KANU later left the coalition only to join Party of National Unity, a new coalition led by President Mwai Kibaki. Consequently, some KANU politicians including William Ruto and Musalia Mudavadi left KANU to stay with ODM-Kenya. ODM-Kenya, on the other hand, split into two parties, Orange Democratic Movement (ODM) and ODM-Kenya. The former was led by the late Raila Odinga and the latter by Kalonzo Musyoka.

Thus LDP did not participate the 2007 general elections as most of its members had either joined ODM, while some joined ODM-Kenya. Following the enforcing of the Political Parties act in December 2008, LDP ceased to be a registered political party.

LDP was an observer party at the Liberal International.
