= International Commission of Jurists =

Non-governmental human rights organization based in Geneva, Switzerland

- Abbreviation: ICJ
- Formation: 1952
- Type: NGO with Consultative Status
- Headquarters: Geneva, Switzerland
- Official language: English, French, Spanish
- President: Carlos Ayala
- Secretary-General: Santiago Canton
- Staff: 60
- Website: www.icj.org

The International Commission of Jurists (ICJ) is an international non-governmental human rights organization. It is supported by an International Secretariat based in Geneva, Switzerland, and staffed by lawyers drawn from a wide range of jurisdictions and legal traditions. The Secretariat and the Commission undertake advocacy and policy work aimed at strengthening the role of lawyers and judges in protecting and promoting human rights and the rule of law. In addition, the ICJ has national sections and affiliates in over 70 countries.

The ICJ was established in 1953 by German jurists involved in human rights investigations in the Soviet Zone of post-war Germany. It was partially funded by the Central Intelligence Agency (CIA) to counter the International Association of Democratic Lawyers, perceived as leftist by American officials. Starting from the 1970s, Secretary-General Niall MacDermot moved the organization away from its association with the CIA.

The current ICJ president is Carlos Ayala. Former presidents include Sir Nigel Rodley (2012–2017), a former member of the UN Human Rights Committee, Pedro Nikken (2011–2012) and Mary Robinson (2008–2011), the former UN high commissioner for human rights and president of Ireland.

== History ==
Born at the ideological frontline of a divided post-war Berlin, the ICJ was established following the 1952 'International Congress of Jurists' in West Berlin. The Congress was organized by the 'Investigating Committee of Free Jurists (ICJF)', a group of German jurists committed to investigating human rights abuses carried out in the Soviet Zone of post-war Germany.

During the Congress, delegates decided to make provisions to expand the work of the ICJF to investigate human rights violations in other regions of the world. A five-member 'Standing Committee of the Congress' was appointed for this purpose and, in 1953, the Standing Committee created the "International Commission of Jurists (ICJ)" as a permanent organisation dedicated to the defence of human rights through the rule of law.

One of the key areas of concern for the 106 Congress delegates was the case of Dr. Walter Linse, a West German lawyer and the Acting President of the ICJF. Two weeks prior to the start of the Congress, on 8 July 1952, in an apparent attempt to intimidate participants, Dr. Linse was abducted by East German intelligence agents and delivered to the KGB. Despite international condemnation of the abduction, Dr. Linse was executed in Moscow for "espionage" in 1953.

In 1955, the ICJ issued a report entitled Under False Colours in which it stated that "the International Association of Democratic Lawyers and its subsidiaries proceed from a principle which is diametrically opposed to those which form the basis of the Commission's work. Although it is careful not to pronounce itself openly on the subject, the International Association of Democratic Lawyers defends and supports the principles of Soviet-Communism."

The ICJ was initially partially funded by the Central Intelligence Agency through the American Fund for Free Jurists, but the CIA's role was not known to most of the ICJ's members. American founders like Allen Dulles and John J. McCloy conceived it as a counter to the International Association of Democratic Lawyers, which had been set up by leftist French lawyers with connections to the French resistance. Ex-CIA officer Philip Agee considered that the ICJ was "set up and controlled by the CIA for propaganda operations." The CIA funding became public in 1967, but the organization survived the revelations after a period of reform under Secretary General Seán MacBride, and through Ford Foundation funding. MacBride himself was involved in CIA funding, according to information the US government reported.

From 1970 to 1990, Niall MacDermot was Secretary-General, succeeding Seán MacBride. MacDermot moved the ICJ away from its association with the CIA, to the forefront of the international human rights movement.

In 1978, the ICJ established the Centre for the Independence of Judges and Lawyers (CIJL). It was instrumental in the formulation and adoption of the UN Basic Principles on the Independence of the Judiciary and the UN Basic Principles on the Role of Lawyers and its mandate is to work for their implementation.

In 1980, the ICJ received the European Human Rights Prize by Parliamentary Assembly of the Council of Europe.

In 1986, the ICJ gathered a group of distinguished experts in international law to consider the nature and scope of the obligations of States parties to the International Covenant on Economic, Social and Cultural Rights. The meeting witnessed the birth of the Limburg Principles on the Implementation of the International Covenant on Economic, Social and Cultural Rights, which continue to guide international law in the area of economic, social and cultural rights.

In the 1990s, a number of important international developments took place as a result of initiatives by the ICJ. These included the UN Declaration on the Protection of All Persons from Enforced Disappearance and the recommendation by the Programme of Action of the World Conference on Human Rights in Vienna to work on the setting up of an International Criminal Court. This was the direct result of an international conference on impunity, organised by the ICJ under the auspices of the United Nations in 1992, which adopted an appeal asking the Vienna conference to "set up an international penal tribunal…in order to finally break the cycle of impunity". In November 2006 the ICJ held an international meeting in Yogyakarta for LGBT rights and published The Yogyakarta Principles in March 2007.

The ICJ also initiated the drafting of the set of Principles for the Protection and Promotion of Human Rights through Action to Combat Impunity and the Basic Principles and Guidelines on the Right to a Remedy and Reparation for Victims of Violations of International Human Rights and Humanitarian Law, both under examination at the UN Human Rights Commission and also received the United Nations Prize in the Field of Human Rights in 1993.

In April 2013, the ICJ was presented with the Light of Truth Award by the Dalai Lama and the International Campaign for Tibet. The award is presented to organisations who have made outstanding contributions to the Tibetan cause.

In the spring of 2026, the International Commission of Jurists was declared undesirable in Russia.

== Current activities ==
The ICJ is active in promoting human rights and the rule of law at the international (e.g. the UN), regional, and national (e.g. JUSTICE in the UK) levels.

The ICJ's International Law and Protection Programme works to promote the application of international law to violations of a civil, political, social or economic nature. The focus is on the international obligations of states to respect human rights, protect victims, and hold state and non-state actors accountable for violations and abuses. Specific areas of work include:

- Centre for the Independence of Judges and Lawyers (CIJL);
- Economic, social and cultural rights;
- Business and Human Rights;
- Sexual Orientation and Gender Identity;
- Women's Human Rights;
- United Nations Human Rights Mechanisms; and
- Global Security and the Rule of Law.

The ICJ operates regional programmes in Africa, Asia Pacific, Central America, Europe, and the Middle East and North Africa. These focus on promoting and supporting the independence of the judiciary, the rule of law, and human rights issues specific to their local contexts.

== National Sections ==
As at 2015 there are 21 autonomous National Sections of the ICJ. They are:

- Africa: ICJ Africa
- Australia: Australian Section of the ICJ
- Austria: Österreichische Juristen-Kommission
- Canada: ICJ Canada
- Chile: Comisión Chilena de Derechos Humanos
- Colombia: Comisión Colombina de Juristas
- Denmark: Danish Section of the ICJ
- Ecuador: Asociación Ecuatoriana de Juristas
- Germany: Deutsche Sektion der Internationalen Juristen-Kommission E.V.
- Hong Kong: Justice Hong Kong
- India: Karnataka State Commission of Jurists
- Italy: Jura Hominis
- Kenya: ICJ Kenya
- Nepal: Nepalese Section of the ICJ
- Netherlands: Nederlands Juristen Comité voor de Mensenrechten (NJCM)
- Norway: ICJ Norway
- Poland: Polish Section of the ICJ
- Slovenia: Slovenian Section of the ICJ
- Sweden: Svenska Avdelningen av Internationella Juristkommissionen
- Switzerland: Swiss section of the ICJ
- United Kingdom: JUSTICE
- United States: American Association for the ICJ

== Congresses of the ICJ ==
Every few years, the ICJ convenes a World Congress, where jurists from around the world work together to address a pressing human rights issue and agree normative principles and objectives in a public Declaration. These Declarations have frequently been used by inter-governmental bodies, including the United Nations, as well as bar associations, lawyers, academic centres and other human rights NGOs around the world. For example, the ICJ was responsible for the Declaration of Delhi on the rule of law in 1959, which set out the ICJ's conception of the Rule of Law as being dynamic.

The ICJ's most recent Declaration, agreed at the ICJ's 17th World Congress in December 2012, related to Access to Justice and Right to a Remedy in International Human Rights Systems. The full list of ICJ Congresses is as follows:

- 2012 – Geneva, Switzerland – Access to Justice and Right to a Remedy in International Human Rights Systems
- 2008 – Geneva, Switzerland – Upholding the Rule of Law and the Role of Judges & Lawyers in times of crisis
- 2004 – Berlin, Germany – Upholding Human Rights and the Rule of Law in Combating Terrorism
- 2001 – Geneva, Switzerland
- 1998 – Cape Town, South Africa
- 1995 – Bangalore, India – Economic, Social and Cultural Rights and the Role of Lawyers
- 1992 – Cartigny, Switzerland
- 1989 – Caracas, Venezuela – The Independence of Judges and Lawyers
- 1985 – Nairobi, Kenya – Human and Peoples' Rights in Africa
- 1981 – The Hague, Netherlands – Development and the Rule of Law
- 1977 – Vienna, Austria – Human Rights in an Undemocratic World
- 1971 – Aspen, USA – Justice and the Individual: The Rule of Law under Current Pressures
- 1966 – Geneva, Switzerland – The ICJ's Mandate, Policies and Activities
- 1962 – Rio de Janeiro, Brazil – Executive Action and the Rule of Law
- 1959 – New Delhi, India – The Rule of Law in a Free Society
- 1955 – Athens, Greece – The Rule of Law
- 1952 – Berlin, Germany – The International Congress of Jurists

== See also ==
- Vivian Bose
- Rule of law
- World Assembly of Youth
- Congress for Cultural Freedom
- International Confederation of Free Trade Unions
- International Federation of Journalists
- JUSTICE
