= Asante Africa Foundation =

US-based non-profit organization

- Type: Non-profit organization
- Industry: Education
- Founded: 2006
- Headquarters: Livermore, California, United States
- Key people: Erna Grasz (Founder and CEO)

Asante Africa Foundation is a non-profit organization that educates East Africa's youth. Its headquarters are in Oakland, California, with offices in Samburu, Kenya, and Arusha, Tanzania.

== History ==
Asante Africa Foundation was established in 2006 by Erna Grasz, a corporate executive, Emmy Moshi, a Tanzanian entrepreneur, and school principal and a member of the Kenyan Maasai tribe. The foundation began as a small two-village project, and has since expanded across Kenya, Uganda and Tanzania.

== Programs ==
Asante Africa Foundation works to increase access to education and improve educational quality for East African youth and children. The organization focuses on 4 programs.
