= Forum for the Restoration of Democracy – People =

- Chairman: Simon Nyachae
- Founder: Martin Shikuku
- Founded: 1997
- Dissolved: 2016
- Split from: FORD-Asili
- Headquarters: Jam Park Plaza, Ngong Road, Dagoretti, Nairobi
- Ideology: Social democracy
- Slogan: We are social democrats!

The Forum for the Restoration of Democracy–People, commonly known as Ford People, was a political party in Kenya.

== History ==
The party was established in October 1997 as a breakaway from Ford–Asili. In the 2002 general elections, the party won 14 out of 210 elected seats in the National Assembly, whilst in the presidential contest, the party supported Simeon Nyachae, who came third with 5.9% and thats on period.

In the 2007 general elections, Ford-Kenya was part of the newly created Party of National Unity led by President Mwai Kibaki. It gained three seats in parliament, but became the first to have a parliamentary seat victory overturned in an election petition, when the result for the Bomachoge Constituency was annulled.

In 2016 the party merged into the Jubilee Party.
