= Shirikisho Party of Kenya =

Political party in Kenya

- Leader: Chirau Ali Mwakwere
- Chairperson: Linah Mkasi Buni
- Secretary-General: Yusuf Abubakar
- Vice Chairperson: Nassir Mohammad
- Treasurer: Wakio Mzozo
- Vice Treasurer: Shaima Rama Shikely
- Organising Secretary: Rukia Ahmed
- Deputy Leader: Hassan Joho
- Founded: 1997
- National affiliation: PNU

Website
- www.shirikishopartykenya.org

The Shirikisho Party of Kenya is a political party in Kenya. (Shirikisho means Union or Federation in Swahili). The party was formed in 1997 and had some political influence in the Coast Region. At the last legislative elections, 27 December 2002, the party won 1 out of 212 elected seats.

At the Kenyan general election, 2007, Shirikisho was part of the newly created alliance Party of National Unity led by President Mwai Kibaki but failed even to clinch a single seat in parliament.

== 2008 Onwards ==
In December 2008, Shirikisho was once again in the headlines for selecting Chirau Ali Mwakwere as party leader despite his being elected to parliament on and holding office in PNU as a vice chairman.
