= 2002 Kenyan general election =

- 27 December 2002
- Presidential election
- Turnout: 57.18%
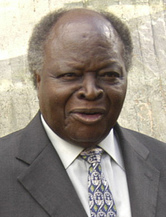

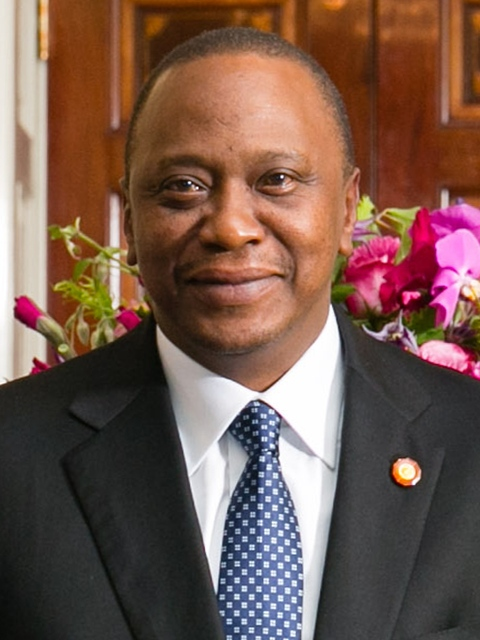

Nominee	Mwai Kibaki	Uhuru Kenyatta	Simeon Nyachae
Party	NARC	KANU	FORD–People
Popular vote	3,646,277	1,835,890	345,152
Percentage	62.20%	31.32%	5.89%
- Results by province
President before election
Daniel arap Moi
KANU
Elected President
Mwai Kibaki
NARC

General elections were held in Kenya on 27 December 2002. Voters elected the president, members of the National Assembly and local officials.

Mwai Kibaki of the National Rainbow Coalition (NARC) was elected, defeating Uhuru Kenyatta of the Kenya African National Union (KANU) and Simeon Nyachae of FORD–People.

Incumbent president Daniel arap Moi was ineligible to pursue a third term due to the two-term limit in the Constitution of Kenya. This was the first truly free general election held in Kenya since independence in 1964; several by-elections were held in 1966 before the onset of de facto one-party rule in 1969. The general election saw the end of the long-standing dominance of the KANU, which had governed the country under semi-authoritarian rule since independence in 1963, including 23 years as the only legal party. The National Rainbow Coalition won a majority in the National Assembly.

== Background ==
Incumbent president Moi was constitutionally barred from running in the 2002 presidential elections. Some of his supporters floated the idea of amending the constitution to allow him to run for a third term, but Moi preferred to retire, choosing Uhuru Kenyatta, the son of Kenya's first president, as his successor. In protest of Moi's decision, a group of disappointed KANU presidential aspirants quit KANU and formed the Liberal Democratic Party (LDP).

In preparation for the 2002 elections, Kibaki's Democratic Party affiliated with several other opposition parties, including the LDP and National Alliance Party of Kenya (NAK), to form the National Rainbow Coalition (NARC). On 14 October 2002, at a large opposition rally in Uhuru Park in Nairobi, Kibaki was nominated as the NARC candidate after Raila Odinga declared Kibaki Tosha! (Kibaki is the one!).

== Results ==
=== President ===
Candidate	Party	Votes	%
Mwai Kibaki	National Rainbow Coalition	3,646,277	62.20
Uhuru Kenyatta	Kenya African National Union	1,835,890	31.32
Simeon Nyachae	FORD–People	345,152	5.89
James Orengo	Social Democratic Party	24,524	0.42
David Ng'ethe	Chama Cha Uma	10,061	0.17
Total		5,861,904	100.00
Valid votes		5,861,904	98.09
Invalid/blank votes		114,006	1.91
Total votes		5,975,910	100.00
Registered voters/turnout		10,451,150	57.18
Source: IFES

=== National Assembly ===
Party or alliance		Votes	%	Seats	+/–
National; Rainbow; Coalition	Liberal Democratic Party			59	New
National; Rainbow; Coalition	Democratic Party			39	0
National; Rainbow; Coalition	FORD–Kenya			21	+4
National; Rainbow; Coalition	National Party of Kenya			6	New
National; Rainbow; Coalition	Total			125	+69
Kenya African National Union				64	–43
FORD–People				14	+11
FORD–Asili				2	+1
Safina				2	–3
Sisi Kwa Sisi				2	New
Shirikisho Party of Kenya				1	0
Other parties				0	–
Appointed members				12	0
Total				222	0
Registered voters/turnout		10,451,150	–		
Source: African Elections Database

Of the 12 appointed seats, seven were members of the National Rainbow Coalition, four were members of KANU and one was a member of FORD–People.

== See also ==
- 9th Parliament of Kenya
