= Lari Constituency =

Electoral constituency in Kenya

Lari
- constituency for the Parliament of Kenya
- Lari Constituency within Kiambu County

- Kiambu County within Kenya
- County: Kiambu
- Population: 135,303
- Area: 432 km^{2} (166.8 sq mi)

Current constituency
- Number of members: 1
- Party: UDA
- Member of Parliament: Joseph Mburu Kahangara
- Wards: 5

Lari Constituency is an electoral constituency in Kenya, located in the northwestern part of Kiambu County. The constituency was established in 1966 from Limuru Constituency. Lari borders Kinangop to the North, Limuru to the South, Githunguri and Gatundu North constituencies to the east and Naivasha Constituency to the west. Lari is one of the 12 constituencies in Kiambu County, and is further divided to five wards each electing a representative to the Kiambu County Assembly.

The constituency is predominantly rural. The main towns in the area are Kijabe, Kinale, Kimende and Nyambari.

== History ==
The name Lari is derived from the Maasai language meaning "the place of green grass". During the 19th century Lari was a reserve grazing ground for the Maasai Community, with pasture available throughout the year. The Maasai would frequent the area, which is located at the foot of the Great Rift Valley to graze their cattle during the dry season.

Lari Constituency was created in 1966 after the first Kenyan Senate and House of representatives merged to form the National Assembly. The constituency was established as a special seat for the then Kiambu Senator J M Koinange. He was made the first Lari MP with no elections being held.

=== Night of the Long Knives ===
Lari features prominently in the history of Kenya's fight for independence. On 26 March 1953, Mau Mau combatants attacked and killed about 100 loyalists in the area in what came to be known as the 'Night of the long Knives'/ mûito wa Lari. Among the fatalities were Chief Luka, a local chieftain, and 97 other loyalists, including 13 members of Chief Luka's immediate family. This attack was followed by retaliation from colonial troops (including the King's African Rifles), with revenge attacks on the local population that killed about 400 people. Many of these people were buried in Kereita Forest, which is the site of a mass grave.

== Geography ==
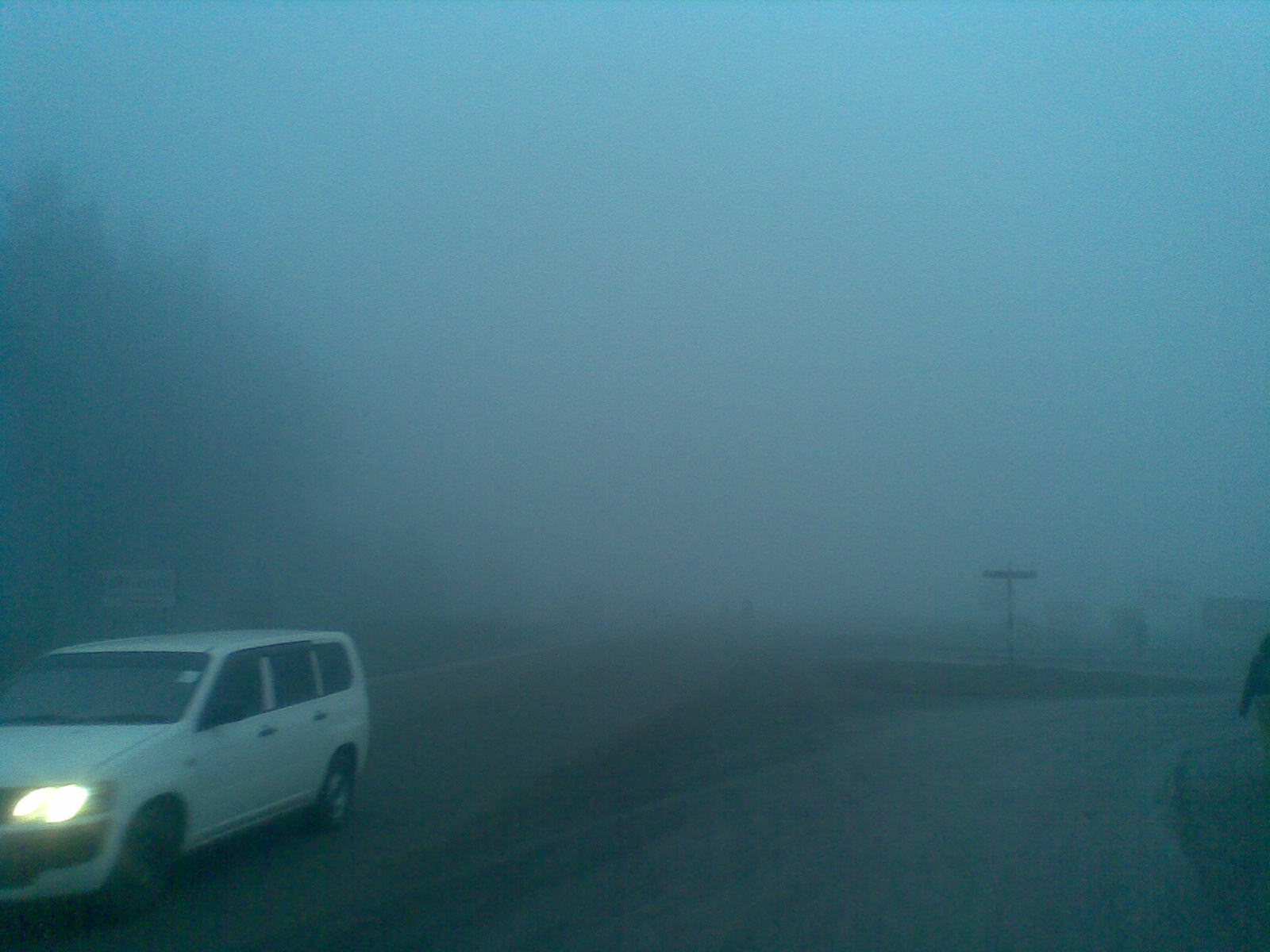
A vehicle on the Nairobi – Nakuru highway at Uplands Section. Lari is sometimes cold and foggy, with visibility limited to 10 meters.

Lari has a total area of 439.20 square Kilometers. The area is largely mountainous. Part of Lari lies on an escarpment of the Great Rift Valley between Gitithia and Kijabe locations. The highest point in the constituency is near the existing Soko Mjinga roadside market on the A104 trunk road where the border of Kiambu and Nyandarua Counties is located, at an altitude of approximately 2650M above sea level.

Lari is largely forested, with Uplands Forest, Kireita Forest, Kinale forest, Kamae forest and parts of the large Kikuyu Escarpment Forest found in the area. The area is relatively cold because of its location on the windward side of the Aberdare Range. As a result, it receives a considerable amount of rainfall per year.

== Administrative units ==
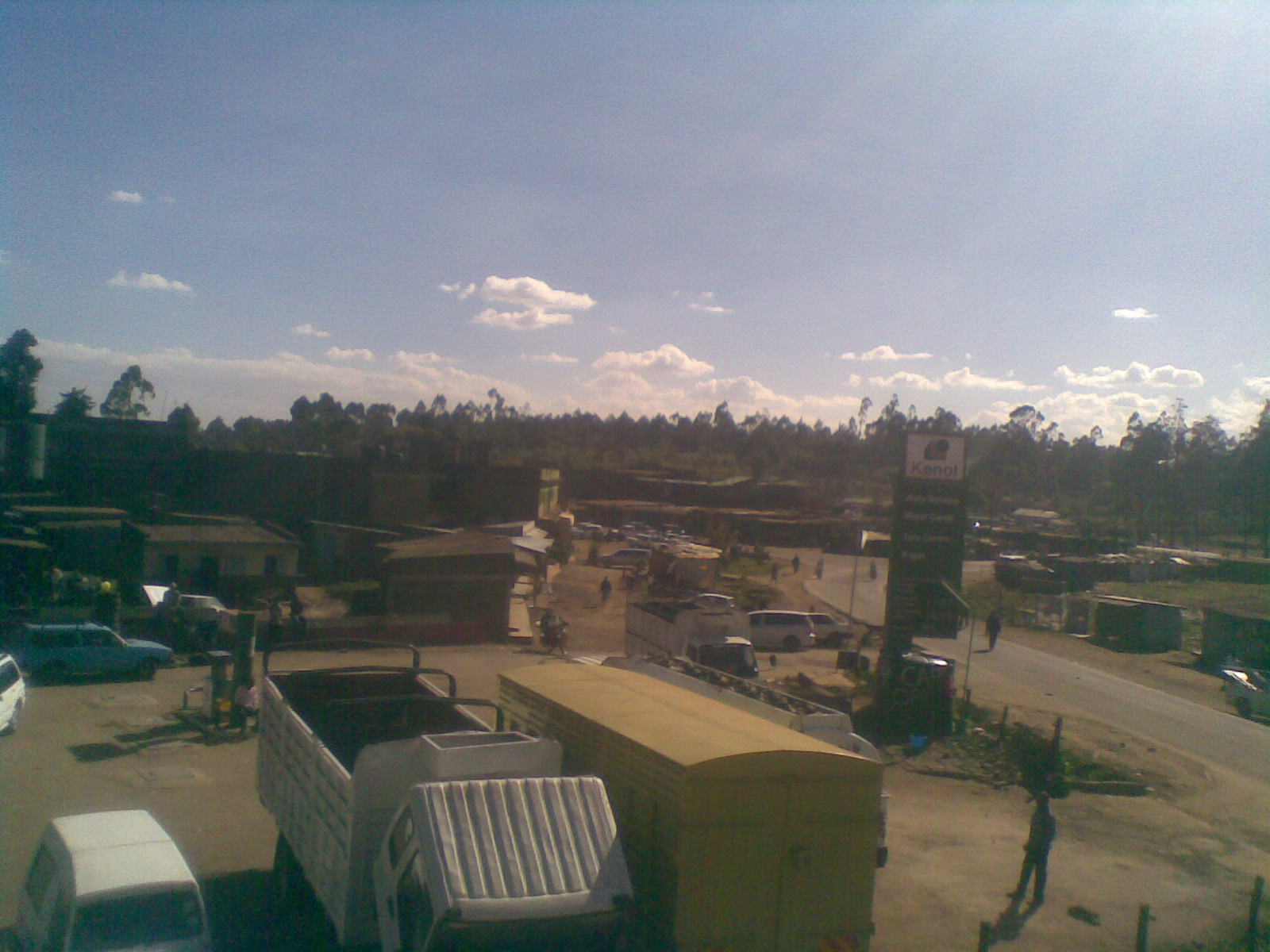
Nyambari Shopping Center. The Second most populous center in Lari Constituency.

In the national government Lari is a District with its administrative offices in Kimende Township. Its further divided into 22 locations.

Under the County Government of Kiambu, Lari a sub-county headed by a Sub-County administrator. Lari is further divided into 5 Wards: Lari/Kirenga, Kijabe, Kamburu-Kamuchege, Kinale and Nyanduma Wards. Kimende Township is a minor town in the area.

== Economic activities ==
Majority residents of Lari practice agriculture as the main source of livelihood, with the area dominated by subsistence farming. Tea farming is largely practiced by residents of the eastern part of Lari. this areas include Kagwe, Kagaa, Gatamaiyu and Matimbei areas. Crops grown for sale include vegetables such as cabbage, coriander, spinach and kale (sukuma wiki). Vegetable farming in the constituency is largely favored by the large amounts of rainfall received throughout the year and the continuous cold seasons.

There are two major markets for vegetables in the constituency; Soko Mjinga Market and Nyambari Godown Sukuma Wiki Market. Both markets supply approximately 1,500 bags of kale per day to the major towns in Kenya. Lorries also ferry tonnes of cabbage from Kinale location daily to various towns in Kenya.

Lari also produces majority of the pears found in Kenya, with most of the crop grown in Nyambari, Gitithia, Githirioni, Kirenga, Kimende and Kambaa locations.

Many farmers in the area rear dairy cows. While the milk is produced mainly for personal consumption, the surplus is sold, usually to dairy cooperatives that have local offices in Lari. There are four milk processing plants in the area: Sundale Dairy Products in Uplands, Green Land Dairy in Nyambari, Kinale Milk processing Plant in Kinale, and Uplands Dairy and food processors [Pascha] in [Kagwe]

== Industry ==
There are a number of industries engaged in processing primarily agricultural products locally produced in Lari, such as the Farmers Choice Bacon Factory in Uplands, and the dairy processing plants for the milk produced in the area. Additionally, the Carbacid Kenya Plant was established to mine naturally existing carbon dioxide in the area.

== Civil society ==
Lari is the home to a number of community-based organizations. The Kijabe Environment Volunteers (KENVO), a voluntary community-based organization based in Kimende Township, is engaged in developing sustainable nature conservation programs in the Kikuyu Escarpment Forest. The Naitera Community Empowerment Programme is another community-based organization, based in Nyambari Town, that aims to preserve the community's cultural heritage including preservation and management of environment through active community participation. Naitera operates across the wider Kiambu County where it advocates for good public management and accountability through Civic education as an avenue of promoting democracy and good governance.

== Infrastructure ==
- The Mombasa – Kampala railway passes through the constituency. Lari has two railway substations; Uplands Substation and Matathia Substation.
- The Nairobi – Nakuru Highway (A104 road) cuts across the constituency starting from Nyambari Shopping Center connecting Kimende and exiting at Soko Mjinga Vegetable Market. Lari also has 3 other major roads Uplands – Githunguri road, Kimende – Kagwe – Githunguri road and Gichiengo – Kijabe road. Most roads are not tarmacked.
- Bathi Dam, located in Kijabe Ward is the major supplier of water within the constituency. The dam also supplies water to Nairobi.

== Hospitals ==
The Kijabe Mission Hospital is the largest private health facility in the area, located in Kijabe Town. Lari Level Four Hospital is the largest government health institution in the constituency, located at Rukuma Shopping Center in Lari/Kirenga Ward

== Tourism ==
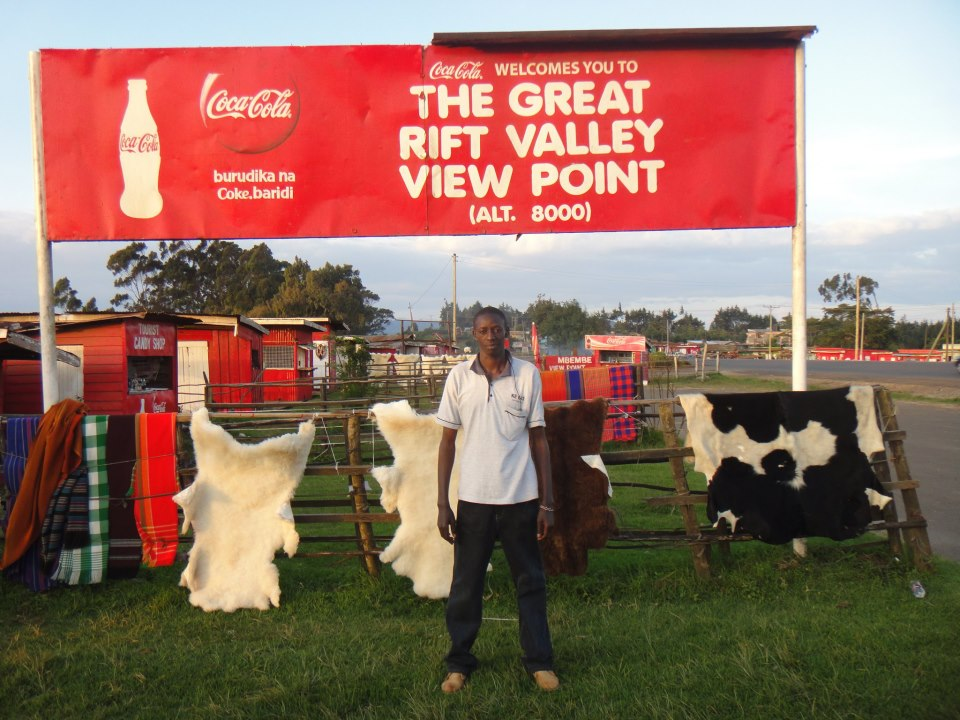
A Tourist poses for a photograph at The Great Rift Valley View point in Lari Constituency

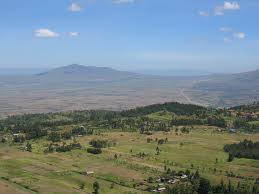
Mt Longonot, Kenya as viewed from Lari Constituency at the Great Rift Valley View Point

=== Rift Valley viewpoint ===
The Lari section of the escarpment is the highest point of the Great Rift Valley along the Nairobi-Nakuru Highway. This area of the escarpment gives tourists a good view of the Great Rift Valley with a view of the Longonot Crater, Suswa Hills and the escarpments of the Great Rift Valley.

=== The forest ===
Kerieta/Kamae forests are part of the great aberdare forests that are gazetted forest reserves and is home to a number of elephants, which can be seen along the Flyover – Gatundu road. The Kereita Cave and Waterfall are located in Kereita Forest at the southernmost end of the Aberdares range. The forest is a designated Important Bird Area. One of these trails, the Carbacid trail, leads to Kereita Waterfall on the Gatamaiyu River, and the adjacent cave that is home to a small bat colony.

=== Zip lining and forest lounge ===
The Zipline is a Six-line course for zip liners called The Colobus Monkey located in Kereita Forest is currently the second longest in Africa – 2.4 km long and 92m high. The world-class zip-lines installed and operated by Flying Fox, have a carrying capacity of a maximum of 115 kilograms and are operated under European Union safety. regulations The forest activities are managed African Forest Lodges that offer other services including mountain biking, archery, paintballing, tree planting and climbing and a Restaurant within the forest.

== Politics ==
Lari has for a long time voted separately from other constituencies in Kiambu and Central Province. Since the start of multiparty democracy in 1992 Lari has never voted for a Member of Parliament from the same party as the siting president despite winning with the presidential vote in 2002 and 2007. However, in 2013 Kenya Elections Hon. Mburu Kahangara became the first Member of Parliament to be elected in Lari while belonging to the same party as the sitting president since 1992.

=== Members of Parliament ===
Elections for the Members of Parliament for Lari Constituency have been held since the constituency was gazetted in 1966.

Elections	MP	Party	Notes
1966	J. M. Koinange	KANU	
1969	Andrew Kuria Kinyanjui	KANU	One-party system
1974	Andrew Kuria Kinyanjui	KANU	One-party system
1979	Peter Turuthi Mungai	KANU	One-party system
1983	Peter Turuthi Mungai	KANU	One-party system.
1988	Andrew Kuria Kinyanjui	KANU	One-party system.
1992	Philip Gitonga	Ford-Asili	
1997	Philip Gitonga	SDP	
2002	James Viscount Kimathi	KANU	
2007	David Njuguna Kiburi Mwaura	PPK	
2013	Joseph Mburu Kahangara	TNA	
2017	Jonah Mburu Mwangi	JP	
2022	Joseph Mburu Kahangara	UDA	

=== County Assembly Wards ===
Lari has five wards. each ward elects a representative to the Kiambu County Assembly. Currently all the Five representative are from Jubilee Party. The ruling party of Kenya.

County Assembly Wards	Population	Registered voters	County Representative	Political Party
Kinale	26,007	9,083	Hon. Dominic Mbugua Kiranga	JP
Kijabe	27,612	7,790	Hon. Stephen Nyutu Wamwere	JP
Nyanduma	23,454	7865	Hon. Joseph Mwai Mbugua	JP
Kamburu	18,951	7,432	Hon. George Gathuru Mburu	JP
Lari/Kirenga	27,871	9,365	Hon. Joseph Karichu Wanjiru	JP
Total	123,895	50,972		
		IEBC Website.	Kenya Gazette Notice, March 2013	
