= Limuru Constituency =

Kenyan electoral constituency

Limuru
- constituency for the Parliament of Kenya
- Limuru Constituency within Kiambu County

- Kiambu County within Kenya
- County: Kiambu
- Population: 159,314
- Area: 285 km^{2} (110.0 sq mi)

Current constituency
- Number of members: 1
- Party: UDA
- Member of Parliament: John Kiragu Chege
- Wards: 5

Limuru Constituency is an electoral constituency in Kenya. It is one of twelve constituencies in Kiambu County. The constituency was established for the 1963 elections and since then, the constituency's population has grown to 159,314 people (79,632 males and 79,682 females) according to the 2019 census.

== Members of Parliament ==
Elections	MP	Party	Notes
1963	James Samuel Gichuru	KANU	
1969	James Samuel Gichuru	KANU	One-party system
1974	James Samuel Gichuru	KANU	One-party system
1979	James Samuel Gichuru	KANU	One-party system
1983	Jonathan Njenga	KANU	One-party system.
1988	Samuel Ngige Mwaura	KANU	One-party system.
1992	George Nyanja	Ford-Asili	
1997	George Nyanja	NDP	
2002	Simon Kanyingi Kuria	KANU	
2007	Arch. Peter Mungai Mwathi	Ford-People	
2013	Eng. John Kiragu Chege	TNA	
2017	Arch. Peter Mungai Mwathi	Jubilee	
2022	Eng. John Kiragu Chege	UDA	

== Locations and wards ==
Locations
Location	Population*
Karambani	27,369
Limuru	42,084
Tigoni	11,578
Ndeiya	26,892
Ngecha	12,318
Rironi	8,589
Total	138830
1999 census.

Wards
Ward	Registered Voters	Local Authority
Bibirioni	6,575	Kiambu County
Kamirithu	13,100	Kiambu County
Limuru Central	4,096	Kiambu County
Limuru East	4,945	Kiambu County
Tigoni	6,082	Kiambu county
Ndeiya	10,266	Kiambu county
Ngecha	10,283	Kiambu county
Total	55,347	
*September 2005.
