= Presidency of Daniel arap Moi =

Era of Daniel arap Moi's governance

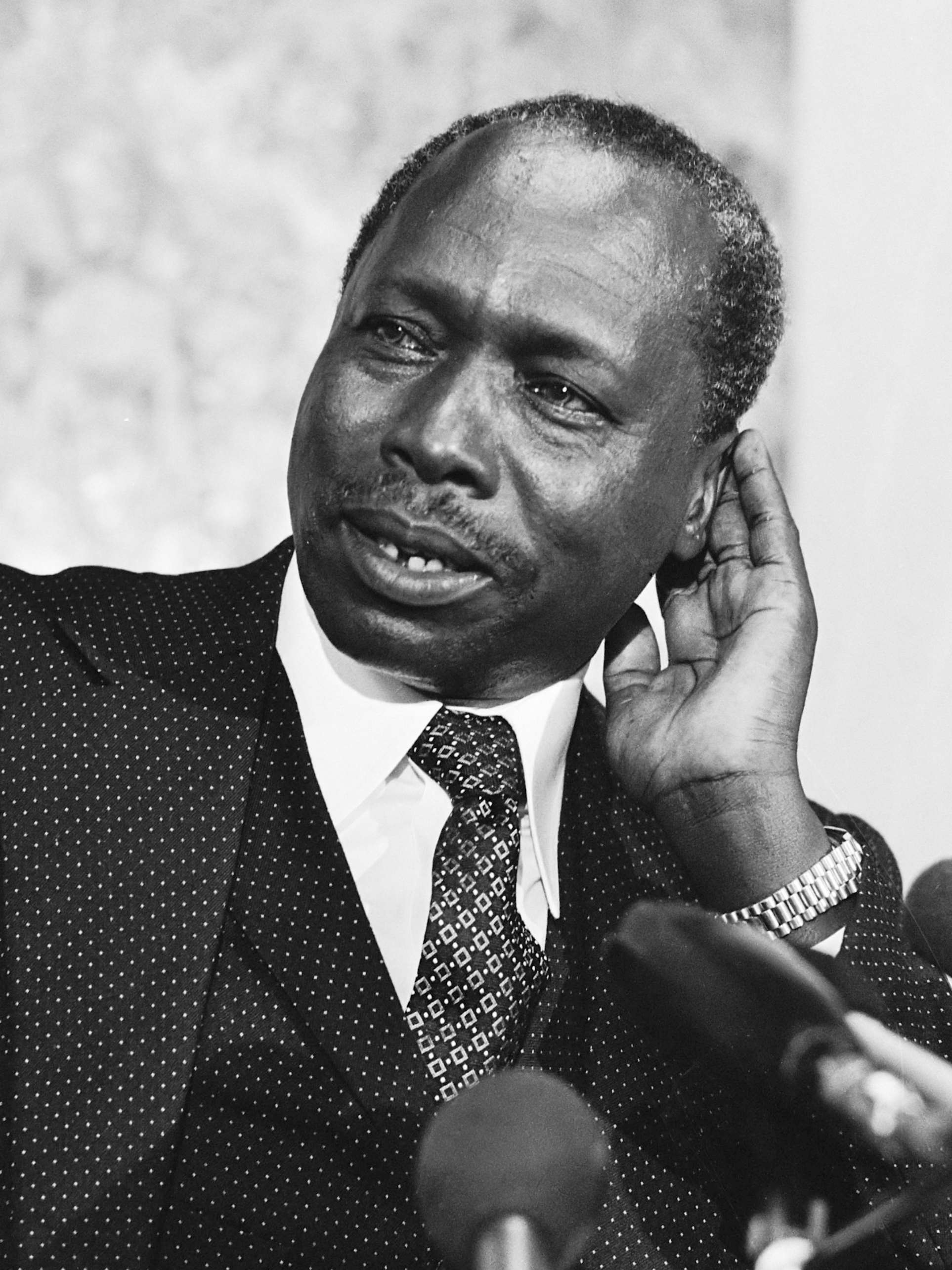
- Moi in 1979
- Presidency of Daniel Moi; 22 August 1978 – 30 December 2002
- President: Daniel arap Moi
- Party: KANU
- Seat: State House
- Standard of the President

The presidency of Daniel arap Moi began on 22 August 1978, when Daniel arap Moi was sworn in as the 2nd President of Kenya, and ended on 30 December 2002. Moi, a KANU party member, took office following the death of the then president Jomo Kenyatta on the same day. He was sworn as interim president for 90 days during which the country was to prepare for a presidential election to be held on 8 November. Moi won reelections in 1988, 1992 and 1997, defeating Mwai Kibaki in the latter two elections. He was succeeded by Mwai Kibaki in 2002. He died at the age of 95 on 4 February 2020.

== 1978 presidential election ==
Following the death of Mzee Jomo Kenyatta on 22 August 1978, Moi became acting president. According to the Old Constitution, a new president was to be elected within 90 days following the demise of the sitting president. As a necessity, Moi was sworn in as the president since he was the vice president at the time of Kenyatta's death.

== Campaign and manifesto ==
Special presidential election for the balance of Kenyatta's term was held on 8 November, 90 days later. Moi was the sole candidate. He received strong support mainly because Kenyans were weary of the ruling party and their leader, Jomo Kenyatta. Kenyatta had appointed his kinsmen and tribesmen within the Kikuyu community in all the important positions of government, earning the name Kiambu Mafia. Because Moi was a Kalenjin and, therefore, an outsider, people regarded him as the best replacement to bring nationalism back to the country.

During his campaign in 1978, Moi promised to have an inclusive government, battle tribalism, corruption and improve the economy. These promises earned him an unopposed presidential bid, leading to his unanimous election to office. Within days after his appointment, Moi freed 26 prisoners who had been detained without trial. He cracked down drunkards and spoke openly against abuse of office. Kenyans were convinced he was on the road to deliver his campaign promises and manifesto.

== Politics and appointments ==
After he became president, Moi appointed Kibaki to be his vice president. Moi quickly consolidated his power, banning opposition parties and promoting his Kalenjin countrymen to positions of authority at the expense of the Kikuyu. He also curried favour with the army. Despite his popularity, however, Moi was too weak to consolidate his power and relied hugely on Kibaki to wield power. Moi appointed people who were loyal to him and unopposed to his leadership. Like Kenyatta, he appointed people mainly from his ethnic group into important leadership positions and stemmed opposition through brute force and arrests.

Learning from fellow African leaders like Mugabe, Moi quickly became dictatorial and started ruling with an iron fist. His ruling party had absolute authority over the country's judicial and politics, while he had supreme authority over all governance issues. Moi was above the law and his word was law, and this led to his legislation in 1982, which made Kenya a de jure one-party state. As a consequence, Moi banned opposition of the ruling party, KANU and frequently vetoed decisions made by parliament.

Moi consolidated all powers and all forms of authority reported to him, including (Provincial Commissioners[PCs], the District Commissioners[DCs], and District Officers [DOs]) who are civil servants.

== Dissension against his presidency and attempted coup ==
As his presidency progressed towards a dictatorship government, Moi started facing opposition within his party as well as outside. To deal with this emerging opposition, Moi further centralised power, consolidated his cabinet and started arresting opponents. The concerns about corruption, tribalism, and freeing prisoners were a thing of the past. When Jaramogi Oginga Odinga and George Anyona sought to register a socialist opposition party in 1982, Moi struck back using the law he had passed to criminalise competitive politics and criticism of his leadership. Moi introduced Amendment Act, Number 7 of 1982 to parliament, which introduced Section 2(A) transforming the country into a de jure one-party state by introducing the detention laws which had been suspended in 1978.

On 1 August 1982, a group of Kenya Air Force officers attempted a military coup to overthrow Moi's presidency. The attempt was stopped but it resulted to the death of between 600 and 1,200 people. This only reinforced Moi's urge to consolidate his powers and become more authoritarian. Moi twice again amended the constitution to cripple oversight authorities such as the Judicial Services Commission and the Attorney General's office by removing their security tenure.

== Furtherance of the authoritarian rule ==
Moi continued to implement authoritarian rule throughout his tenure in office beyond parliament. He introduced queuing as a voting method, which brought large-scale election rigging into mainstream practice. As a result, Kenyans thus lost their right to vote for parliamentary candidates of their choice as disputes arising out of nominations were often referred to the president personally as the final arbiter, who in turn made decisions in favour of his candidates.

== Subsequent terms ==
With no opposition party to rival, Moi's KANU faced weak political candidates and won the presidency in 1988. When multiparty politics were finally allowed in the county, Moi used power and influence to cause disagreements within the opposing parties, which helped him win the 1992 re-election with a wide margin.

A number of the champions of multiparty politics were arrested, detained without trial and tortured, including John Khaminwa, Raila Odinga, Mohammed Ibrahim, Gitobu Imanyara, Kenneth Matiba and Charles Rubia. Suppression of freedom of the press, assembly, association, expression and movement and other fundamental rights of individuals were extended to the press, and non-governmental organizations. In 1991 Moi banned the production of George Orwell's Animal Farm. He also banned Ngugi Wa Thiong'o's play Ngaahika Ndeenda (Kikuyu for, "I Will Marry When I Want") considered by the regime to be subversive because it attacks post-independence African dictators.

== Achievements ==
During Moi's term as president, Kenya achieved a number of successes, including becoming a multiparty democracy, opening the JKIA. Kenya's economy also remained above that of other East African countries despite the country remaining a poor country until the presidency of Kibaki.
