= List of heads of state of Kenya =

This is a list of the heads of state of Kenya, from the independence of Kenya in 1963 to the present day.

From 1963 to 1964 the head of state under the Constitution of 1963 was the queen of Kenya, Elizabeth II, who was also the queen of the United Kingdom and the other Commonwealth realms. The monarch was represented in Kenya by a governor-general. Kenya became a republic within the Commonwealth under a 1964 constitutional amendment and the monarch, governor-general and prime minister were replaced by an executive president.

== Monarch (1963–1964) ==
The succession to the throne was the same as the succession to the British throne.

No.	Portrait	Name (Birth–Death)	Reign			Royal House	Prime minister(s)
No.	Portrait	Name (Birth–Death)	Reign start	Reign end	Duration	Royal House	Prime minister(s)
1		Queen Elizabeth II (1926–2022)	12 December 1963	12 December 1964	1 year	Windsor	Kenyatta

=== Governor-general ===
The governor-general was the representative of the monarch in Kenya and exercised most of the powers of the monarch. The governor-general was appointed for an indefinite term, serving at the pleasure of the monarch. Since Kenya was granted independence by the Kenya Independence Act 1963, rather than being first established as a semi-autonomous dominion and later promoted to independence as defined by the Statute of Westminster 1931, the governor-general was to be always appointed solely on the advice of the Cabinet of Kenya without the involvement of the British government. As Kenya became a republic before Malcolm MacDonald, the former colonial governor, was replaced, this has never happened. In the event of a vacancy the chief justice would have served as the officer administering the government.

Status

Denotes Chief Justice acting as Officer Administering the Government

No.	Portrait	Name (Birth–Death)	Term of office			Monarch	Prime minister
No.	Portrait	Name (Birth–Death)	Took office	Left office	Time in office	Monarch	Prime minister
1		Malcolm MacDonald (1901–1981)	12 December 1963	12 December 1964	1 year	Elizabeth II	Kenyatta

== Republic (1964–current) ==
Under the 1964 Constitutional Amendment establishing the Republic of Kenya, the president replaced the monarch as head of state and the prime minister as chief executive. The president was initially elected by the House of Representatives of Kenya, and, after the merger of the House of Representatives and Senate into a unicameral National Assembly, by the National Assembly, for a five-year term. In the event of a vacancy the vice-president would have served as acting president for 90 days until new elections were held.

Following the enactment of the 1969 Constitution of Kenya, the system of election by the National Assembly was replaced by direct elections under a first-past-the-post system, yet true separation of powers was still not established; the president had to also be elected as an MP and he had to appoint ministers from among MPs, the president was still able to dissolve the National Assembly, and the Assembly was still able to declare no confidence in the ministers. Additionally, until the first multiparty elections in 1992, only one candidate - that of the Kenya African National Union - was nominated and automatically declared winner of the elections without voting actually being held.

With the enactment of the 2010 Constitution, Kenya's current, the first-past-the-post system was replaced in presidential elections in favor of a two-round system, the post of vice-president was renamed deputy president and was made to automatically succeed to the presidency in case of a vacancy for the remainder of the term in a full, not merely acting, capacity, and the requirement of the president, DP, and ministers to also be MPs was abolished, finally establishing separation of powers between the executive and legislature.

Political parties

Kenya African National Union (KANU)
National Rainbow Coalition (NARC)
Party of National Unity (PNU)
The National Alliance (TNA)
Jubilee Party (Jubilee)
United Democratic Alliance (UDA)

Status

Denotes acting president

Symbols

^{†} Died in office

No.	Portrait	Name (Birth–Death)	Elected	Term of office			Political party	Vice president (1964–2013) Deputy president (since 2013)
No.	Portrait	Name (Birth–Death)	Elected	Took office	Left office	Time in office	Political party	Vice president (1964–2013) Deputy president (since 2013)
1		Jomo Kenyatta (1897–1978)	—	12 December 1964	22 August 1978^{[†]}	13 years, 253 days	KANU	Jaramogi Oginga Odinga
1		Jomo Kenyatta (1897–1978)	—	12 December 1964	22 August 1978^{[†]}	13 years, 253 days	KANU	Joseph Murumbi
1		Jomo Kenyatta (1897–1978)	—	12 December 1964	22 August 1978^{[†]}	13 years, 253 days	KANU	Daniel arap Moi
1		Jomo Kenyatta (1897–1978)	1969	12 December 1964	22 August 1978^{[†]}	13 years, 253 days	KANU	Daniel arap Moi
1		Jomo Kenyatta (1897–1978)	1974	12 December 1964	22 August 1978^{[†]}	13 years, 253 days	KANU	Daniel arap Moi
2		Daniel arap Moi (1924–2020)	—	22 August 1978	8 November 1978	24 years, 130 days	KANU	Daniel arap Moi
2		Daniel arap Moi (1924–2020)	1978	8 November 1978	30 December 2002	24 years, 130 days	KANU	Mwai Kibaki
2		Daniel arap Moi (1924–2020)	1979	8 November 1978	30 December 2002	24 years, 130 days	KANU	Mwai Kibaki
2		Daniel arap Moi (1924–2020)	1983	8 November 1978	30 December 2002	24 years, 130 days	KANU	Mwai Kibaki
2		Daniel arap Moi (1924–2020)	1988	8 November 1978	30 December 2002	24 years, 130 days	KANU	Josephat Karanja
2		Daniel arap Moi (1924–2020)	1988	8 November 1978	30 December 2002	24 years, 130 days	KANU	George Saitoti
2		Daniel arap Moi (1924–2020)	1992	8 November 1978	30 December 2002	24 years, 130 days	KANU	George Saitoti
2		Daniel arap Moi (1924–2020)	1997	8 November 1978	30 December 2002	24 years, 130 days	KANU	George Saitoti
2		Daniel arap Moi (1924–2020)	1997	8 November 1978	30 December 2002	24 years, 130 days	KANU	Vacant
2		Daniel arap Moi (1924–2020)	1997	8 November 1978	30 December 2002	24 years, 130 days	KANU	George Saitoti
2		Daniel arap Moi (1924–2020)	1997	8 November 1978	30 December 2002	24 years, 130 days	KANU	Musalia Mudavadi
3		Mwai Kibaki (1931–2022)	2002	30 December 2002	9 April 2013	10 years, 100 days	NARC (until 2007)	Musalia Mudavadi
3		Mwai Kibaki (1931–2022)	2002	30 December 2002	9 April 2013	10 years, 100 days	NARC (until 2007)	Michael Kijana Wamalwa
3		Mwai Kibaki (1931–2022)	2002	30 December 2002	9 April 2013	10 years, 100 days	NARC (until 2007)	Moody Awori
(3)		Mwai Kibaki (1931–2022)	2007	30 December 2002	9 April 2013	10 years, 100 days	PNU	Moody Awori
(3)		Mwai Kibaki (1931–2022)	2007	30 December 2002	9 April 2013	10 years, 100 days	PNU	Kalonzo Musyoka
4		Uhuru Kenyatta (born 1961)	2013	9 April 2013	13 September 2022	9 years, 157 days	TNA (until Sept. 2016)	William Ruto
4		Uhuru Kenyatta (born 1961)	2017	9 April 2013	13 September 2022	9 years, 157 days	Jubilee	William Ruto
5		William Ruto (born 1966)	2022	13 September 2022	Incumbent	4 years, 65 days	UDA	Rigathi Gachagua
5		William Ruto (born 1966)	2022	13 September 2022	Incumbent	4 years, 65 days	UDA	Kithure Kindiki

== Standards ==
Governor-General's Standard

Presidential Standard of Jomo Kenyatta

Presidential Standard of Daniel Arap Moi

Presidential Standard of Mwai Kibaki

Presidential Standard of Uhuru Kenyatta

Presidential Standard of William Ruto – current
