= Kenya African Union =

Political organization

The flag of the KAU, designed by Jomo Kenyatta in 1951

The Kenya African Union (KAU) was a political organization in colonial Kenya, formed in October 1944 prior to the appointment of the first African to sit in the Legislative Council. In 1960 it became the current Kenya African National Union (KANU).

== Formation ==
KAU was formed on October 1, 1944, with the veteran political leader Harry Thuku as its president. Francis Joseph Khamisi became its secretary while Albert Owino became its Treasurer. It had a Representative Committee of seven which included John K. Kebaso (South Nyanza), James Samuel Gichuru (Central), Jimmy Jeremiah (Coast), Simeon Mulandi (Ukambani), Harry L. Nangurai (Maasai) and S.B. Jakeyo (Central Nyanza). Nine days later, on October 10, 1944, Governor Sir Philip Mitchell appointed Eliud Mathu to become the first African to sit in the Kenya Legislative Council. This appointment marked an important turning point in the political development of the Africans. The following month in November 1944, at the insistence of the Governor, the name 'Study' was added to the name becoming the Kenya African Study Union. The Governor stated that the name 'Study' was meant to make it a "colony-wide African body to provide an organization where the views of the educated African elite could be given a forum." The organization was meant to 'study' the problems or grievances of the Africans and accordingly advise Eliud Mathu at the Legislative Council. To change the name to Kenya African Union, Mathu called for a meeting in Harry Thuku's shop in Nairobi, and in attendance was Gichuru, Joseph D. Otiende, Jonathan Njoroge, Henry Mwaniki, Francis Khamisi, Kamau Njoroge, Albert Awino, Ambrose Ofafa, Mucohi Gikonyo and Simeon Mulandi.

== KAU's objectives ==
At inception, the party's objectives included advancing African interests, constitutional reforms, and fighting for better living and working conditions for Africans. KAU also helped coordinate nationalist activities and to unite Kenyan Africans towards a common cause. Initially, KAU enjoyed cordial relations with the Colonial administration but then the relationship quickly turned sour, particularly with the exit of Harry Thuku who was considered a moderate. The colonial administration also created a hostile environment which made the attainment of KAU's objectives difficult. Soon, ideological differences in its ranks, particularly among the moderates and the radicals, threatened to tear apart the fabric that held it together. The lack of political awareness among the Africans coupled with widespread ethnic distrust among the Africans also slowed down the new party. They also lacked adequate funds for operations and for a long time did not have a fixed address.

== Gichuru takes over ==
In January 1945, Thuku resigned, and at the first Delegates Conference held on February 3, 1945, his place was taken over by James Gichuru, a Makerere-trained teacher who had resigned from his teaching position at Alliance High School. Thuku was considered a bit of a moderate taking this position after returning from his decade-long detention for political agitation. James Gichuru quickly reorganized the party and expanded the Delegates. He launched a newspaper "Sauti ya Mwafrika" (Voice of the African) which was edited by Francis Khamisi. The paper articulated the grievances of the Africans. In the next Delegates Conference in February 1946, the name 'Study' was dropped and the party reverted to its old name KAU. At this point, KAU was considered by many to be a reincarnation of the Kikuyu Central Association (KCA) which had been banned in 1939. In fact, one of the Committee members Simeon Mulandi, had been the leader of the Ukamba Member's Union which had been banned alongside the KCA. Under Gichuru, the party took a more nationalistic path. During the Second Delegates Conference, Joseph D. Otiende from North Nyanza (now Western Kenya), was elected vice president of the party, giving the party a more national outlook. Like Gichuru, Otiende had studied at Makerere and had also taught at Alliance High School. They had joined Makerere in the same year (1933) and had also been students at Alliance High School before that. The KAU demanded an end to the 'Kipande system', the identification system much loathed by the Africans. Eliud Mathu successfully had it repealed in what was one of the major triumphs by the Africans. Other demands by the KAU included the abolition of taxes designed only for Africans, the return of alienated land, equal pay for equal work, and increased African representation at the Legislative Council.

== KAU's achievements ==
In January 1946, Governor Mitchell appointed Fanwell Walter Odede to sit at the Legislative Council to replace Rev. Leonard J. Beecher in an acting capacity. Odede remained at the Legislative Council until 1947 when Beecher decided to resign from the Legislative Council altogether. But rather than appoint Odede substantively, Governor Mitchell, decided to appoint Benaiah Apolo Ohanga to replace Beecher and revoked the appointment of Odede. And so officially, Ohanga became the second African to be appointed to the Legislative Council.

== Kenyatta takes over ==
In September 1946, Jomo Kenyatta returned to Kenya and in June 1947, James Gichuru stepped down as President of KAU in favour of Jomo Kenyatta. After spending many years in England representing the grievances of the Africans, Kenyatta had captured the imagination of many Kenyans and had become a towering national figure. He was considered the natural leader in the quest for Independence and consequently steered the KAU towards a more nationalistic agenda with the attainment of independence in mind. In May 1948, Governor Mitchell appointed John Kipsugut araap Chemallan, a pioneer radio broadcaster to the Legislative Council to represent the Northern and Rift Valley Provinces and the Maasai. Eliud Mathu was now designated as the representative for Central Province. Ohanga now represented Nyanza while James Jeremiah represented the Coast. They were formally nominated as unofficial members of the Legislative Council to represent 'the interests of the African Community'. Under Jomo Kenyatta, the KAU moved a notch higher demanding the abolition of taxation, free and compulsory education for Africans, expanded representation at the Legislative Council, better pay and better working conditions, return of alienated lands issuance of title deeds to Africans, respect of African culture, compensation of African ex-soldiers, an end of racial discrimination and release of political prisoners. The party began recruiting members nationwide.

== Demand for Independence ==
On June 10, 1951, the KAU demanded an end to colonial rule and Independence within three years. In November 1951, KAU sent a deputation to the United Nations Conference in Paris where they presented a petition entitled "Land Hunger in Kenya" which called for an urgent solution to the Land question in Kenya with regard to the Africans. The same year, radical members of the KAU in the Nairobi Branch formed a 'Central Committee' known as "Muhimu" (Kiswahili for 'Important') which began to plan more militant methods to achieve Independence. They began oathing members in a secret organization known as the Mau Mau. The "Muhimu" led by Eliud Mutonyi (Chairman), Isaac Gathanju (Secretary), Bildad Kaggia, Paul Ngei, and Fred Kubai as members, coordinated the Mau Mau activities and administration of oaths. The oathing began in Nairobi slums and soon morphed into active oathing in Kiambu, Fort Hall (presently Murang'a County), and Nyeri.

== KAU is banned ==
Soon after his arrival to take up his governorship, Sir Evelyn Baring made a brief tour of Central Kenya to familiarize himself with the situation. He met headmen, chiefs, priests, settlers and other influential members of society, and soon concluded that there was an impending state of anarchy that would almost certainly become unmanageable in due course. He returned to Nairobi and on October 10, 1952, cabled the Secretary of State for the Colonies Oliver Lyttelton seeking permission to declare a state of Emergency in the colony.

Four days later, on October 14, 1952, Lyttelton in response stated, "I approve your proposal to declare a state of Emergency under Emergency Powers Order in Council, 1939, and to take action against Kenyatta and his henchmen. I shall give you my full support in thus maintaining law and order." Five days later, Governor Baring declared a state of Emergency in Kenya.

The following day on October 20, 1952, KAU leaders Jomo Kenyatta and several other leaders were arrested under the Operation Jock Scott. This followed the declaration of the Emergency by the new governor SirEvelyn Baring.

In November 1952, a deputation of KAU leaders which included Walter Odede, W.W.W. Awori and Joseph Murumbi, tried to meet with Lyttelton who had come to oversee the operations against the Mau Mau. They wanted to discuss the unfolding situation with him. Through Governor Baring, they sought and were granted audience with Lyttelton at Government House. But when they arrived, Lyttelton refused to even greet them greatly embarrassing Governor Baring who had arranged the meeting.

Speaking to them separately, Baring asked them to disassociate themselves with Kenyatta and the arrested leaders of KAU. They tried but were unable to convince the Governor that the KAU did not have any Mau Mau adherents in its ranks, and tried to exonerate Kenyatta from any links with the Mau Mau.

During the meeting, The KAU deputation presented a petition to the Governor seeking a number of reforms including the abolition by law of racial discrimination, the extension of education facilities to Africans, elections for African members and increased African representation in the Legislative Council. They also demanded a common roll for all three races with equal seats for Africans and non-Africans. They also demanded commissioned ranks for Africans in the Armed Forces and senior civil service posts; assistance in agricultural development; equal pay for equal qualifications and work and freedom of speech and assembly.

The Emergency dealt a severe blow to the KAU and most of its leaders, particularly those from Central Kenya, were either arrested or had to flee to avoid arrest. Odede took over the leadership of KAU on an acting capacity but he too was arrested on March 8, 1953, again on suspicions of sympathizing with the Mau Mau. KAU was eventually banned on June 8, 1953, eight months into the Emergency. The ban coincided with the arrival of British troops to boost the effort against the Mau Mau. Prior to Odede's arrest, the Luo Union under the Ker Oginga Odinga, issued a statement supporting KAU and this raised fears that the influence of the Mau Mau would spread to Nyanza. After Odede's arrest, the other influential Nyanza leader W.W.W. Awori was constantly harassed even as he demanded the African MLCs be allowed to hold meetings as they wanted.

== KAU and the Mau Mau ==
In his submissions to the Secretary of State for the Colonies seeking to declare a state of Emergency, Governor Baring argued that the KAU leaders, particularly Jomo Kenyatta, were at the back of Mau Mau and behind the violence. The Colonial administration was convinced beyond a doubt that the KAU was behind the Mau Mau movement. On numerous occasions, Jomo Kenyatta had in fact denounced the Mau Mau at a public meeting in February 1951 and also at a public rally at the Kirigiti Stadium in Kiambu on August 24, 1952. The meeting, which was attended by all the Kikuyu notables, had been called to specifically denounce the Mau Mau. One of those who addressed the meeting was Senior Chief Waruhiu Kungu. It was the death of Senior Chief Waruhiu Kungu on October 7, 1952, that convinced Governor Baring that something had to be done. Chief Waruhiu was gunned down at Gachie, some seven miles outside Nairobi while on his way home. His vehicle was blocked by another and a gunman emerged shooting him dead. The act was blamed on the Mau Mau and the declaration of Emergency followed shortly. The British government sent in troops to bolster the war effort against the Mau Mau. General Sir George Erskine was appointed the Commander-in-Chief of the East African Command meant to deal with the Mau Mau decisively. Upon arrival, General Sir George Erskine addressed the Press saying: "…there is no doubt that there are members of the Kenya African Union who have no connections with the violent movement. But the action has been taken because the government has satisfied itself that there is ample evidence to show that the Kenya African Union has been used as a cover by the Mau Mu terrorist organization and that both before and after the Emergency was declared, there has been a connection between many members of the Kenya African Union and the Mau Mau terrorists."

"As an illustration of the connection of many KAU members with the violent Mau Mau movement, two of the most wanted terrorists in Kenya, Dedan Kimathi and Stanley Mathenge are both KAU members, Kimathi having been Secretary of the Rumuruti-Thompson's Falls Branch and Mathenge a member of the Nyeri Branch. Mau Mau evolved out of the Kikuyu Central Association which was proscribed in 1939. Both societies relied on similar oath-taking ceremonies to initiate new members; both were subversive. Shortly after its inauguration in 1944, the KAU was penetrated by the influence of former Kikuyu Central Association and by 1947 became dominated by ex-KCA leaders and members"

During one of his radio addresses, acting Chief Native Commissioner Sir Edward H. Windley stated:

"The Kenya African Union is finished. It was like a bad house destroyed because it was infected with disease, and we cannot use the same bricks to build again. It is for all you sensible and reasonable Africans who believe in good government to get together and work for it in the interests of your people, and to think now how best we can achieve it in the future."

== The formation of KANU ==
On March 27, 1960, the African members of the Legislative Council who had coalesced around a loose political federation known as the Kenya Independence Movement (KIM), met at Kirigiti stadium in Kiambu to discuss the formation of a nationwide political party. Delegates from various political movements across the country were in attendance. Months earlier, in August 1959, eight of the 14 African elected members announced the formation of a moderate Kenya National Party (KNP). Headed by MLC for Nyanza North Masinde Muliro, the new party adopted multi-racialism and even integrated Europeans in its ranks among them S.V. Cooke the European MLC from Mombasa. They also attracted several Asians and Arabs. To counter this move, Tom Mboya and five other African MLCs announced the formation of an all-African Kenya Independence Movement (KIM), declaring that 'African freedom will be achieved only through African nationalism.' During the March 1960 meeting at Kirigiti in Kiambu, a committee was formed to establish a prominent 'Uhuru' political party. That committee, chaired by James Gichuru and Dr. Njoroge Mungai as secretary, also had Oginga Odinga, Dr. Gikonyo Kiano and Tom Mboya among its members. They were tasked to draft the constitution for a new political party. They settled on the name KANU. On May 14, 1960, a second meeting at Kirigiti took place and the delegates ratified the formation of a new political party named the Kenya African National Union. They presented their registration documents to the Registrar of Societies David John Coward. They received the registration documents on June 11, 1960 with James Gichuru as president, Oginga Odinga as Vice President and Tom Mboya as Secretary General. They retained the old KAU flag complete with its colours and adopted the cockerel as its symbol. Indeed the old KAU had roared back to life.

== Conclusion ==
In many ways, the banning of the KAU in June 1953, did not quite extinguish its influence as a political party. Throughout the Emergency, African political activities were completely under check, but the Colonial administration was careful not to push the Africans too far. They instituted reforms meant to deal with the situation that had fomented the outbreak of the Mau Mau rebellion in the first place. Some of the recommendations of the KAU were implemented including the expansion of African representation in both the Legislative Council and the executive council. In 1954, KAU member Benaiah Ohanga was appointed to the executive council becoming the first African minister. More Africans were appointed to the Legislative Council. In March 1957, the Africans were able to choose their own representations through an election for 8 new seats created for the Africans. Further pressure from the Africans saw the seats expanded to 14 and a by-election was held in 1958 to increase the membership. Among its main achievements, the KAU helped united various communities in Kenya under the banner of national unity. The Luo and the Kikuyu seemed particularly close politically and they would eventually merge the different political ideologies into a more cogent national party named the Kenya African National Union (KANU). The new party, formed in 1960 under KAU's erstwhile leader James Gichuru, eventually led to the attainment of self-rule in June 1963 after sweeping the polls against its more moderate rival the Kenya African Democratic Union (KADU). Independence was achieved under the KANU government on December 12, 1964.
