= Paul Kiplimo Boit =

Kenyan politician

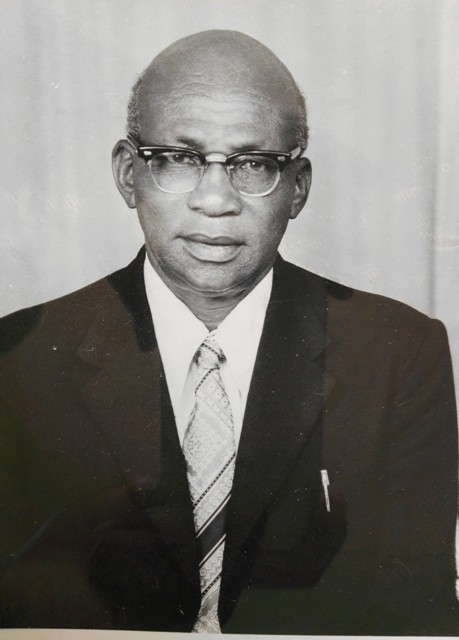
- Born: 1906; Kipkuti Village, Adlai Nandi, Kenya
- Died: 2005 (aged 99)
- Other names: Paulo Kiplimo Arap Boit
- Occupations: Chairman Sirikwa County Council (later divided to (Nandi County, Uasin Gishu County, Trans Nzoia County, West Pokot County Elgeyo Marakwet County), Chairman Wareng County Council, Farmer
- Known for: KANU Politics, Farming

Paul Kiplimo Boit (born 1906) was a prominent KANU politician during the Moi Regime. He was the chairman of Sirikwa County Council (which later came to be divided to Nandi County, Uasin Gishu County, Trans Nzoia County, West Pokot County Elgeyo Marakwet County from 1964 to 1971 and later became the chairman of Wareng County Council one of five Councils split from Sirikwa covering Uasin Gishu (Wareng County Council occupied the same administrative area of the Uasin Gishu District). He was best known for his excellent farming skills which earned him many awards and a visit from the former Tanzanian president Ali Hassan Mwinyi.

== Early life and education ==
Paul Kiplimo Boit was born in 1906 in Kipkutu village South Nandi District (now known as Nandi County). His parents were Kipsasam and Tapseurei. He was brother to the Late Kimagut Arap Tireito and Sister Bot Tendenei and Anne Kabur. He lived with his father in Kaptagat where he was working as a foreman in the saw mill. In 1932, he opted to join Kapsabet High School then known as Kapsabet Government African School (GAS) because of his academic endeavours as opposed to artisan schools, where he completed his education at grade 9 in 1939. He converted to Christianity in 1937.

== Teaching career ==
After completing his grade 9 education he wanted to proceed to Maseno but due to lack of school fees he opted to become a teacher at mission school (Kapsabet Mission). Here he taught among others Retired president Daniel Moi, Edward Limo and Grace Cherotich his wife. He proved to be a successful teacher, teaching curriculum and agriculture which earned him admiration from the colonial administration. In 1936 he became a teacher at the AIM School in Ndulele before moving to DEB School Ndalat where he taught for ten years. His excellent teaching skills gained recognition he was asked by the colonial administration to go and start an outpost school at Ndalat in 1940. It was at this when he married his former student Grace Cherotich and settled in Ndalat at a place called Kolonget.

== Entry into farming ==
He then quit teaching in 1946 and became a cattle auctioneer a job that took him all over Nandi selling cattle as an employee of the Nandi Local Native Council. Here he helped many livestock traders to prosper. His efficiency in the field enabled him to sell more than 600 animals in a day.

He went ahead to practice modern farming which was by then associated to the white settlers. This earned him a visit by the governor Sir Everlyn Barring. He was awarded recognition by King George VI for his exemplary farming practice. Still working in the local government he developed himself to be admired by many including the colonial government and white settlers. He bought a 70.9-acre farm in Ndalat and with his deep interest in dairy farming; he reared prized Guernseys which saw him clinch a contract to supply milk to the Cow & Gate plant in Eldoret. Cow & Gate is the international brand of milk products mainly for children and Boit became its first African supplier.

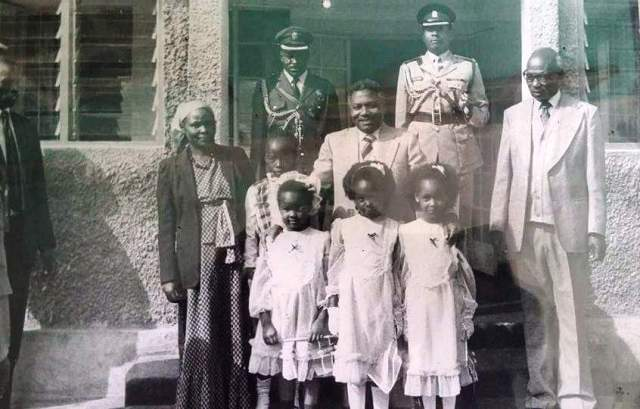
Grace Cherotich Boit (Left) Former President Ali Hassan Mwinyi (Middle) Paul Kiplimo Boit (Right)

In March 1961, he made history as the first African individual to hold shares in the giant Kenya Cooperative Creameries - the firm founded by Lord Delamere back in 1925. In July 1961 he purchased a 620-acre farm in Kapkong near Eldoret where he farmed maize and raised cattle. He inspired other Africans and became their mediator by convincing them to sell cattle and buy land. His ability in farming was identified by the government which led to the visit of various dignitaries among them the former president of Tanzania Ali Hassan Mwinyi to his farm.

== Active Politics ==
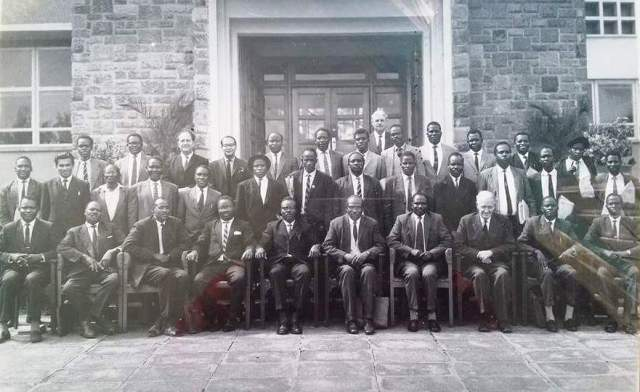
Front Row:- S.W Bunyasi, A. Kandie, K. Rono, W.M. Koskei, I.K. Koimur (vice-chairman), P.K. Boit, (chairman), B.K. Tanui (clerk), L.E. Whitehouse, W.K. Koech, J.K. Sembu. Middle Row:K.C.Orgut, G.D. Shah (Dep. C.E), J. Pusia, M.Kapkelion, E.K. Cheserek, V. Wasike, R.K. Tarus, S.K. Mugun, D.K. Rotich, E.W. Khaemba, J.K. Some, J. Poriot, L. Lotuliamoi, G. Katesem Back Row: Z. Kundu, Z.K Korir (Ag. S.A.A.), R.W. Martin (Treasurer), Dr. M.A. Fazal (M.O.H), J.A. Ogwang (C.H.I), S. Ruto(Ag. Dep Clerk), S.Egan, H.A. Pudsey, S. Kaino, G.W. O'Amoth, S.W. Simiyu (C.E.O), E.A. Muraguri.

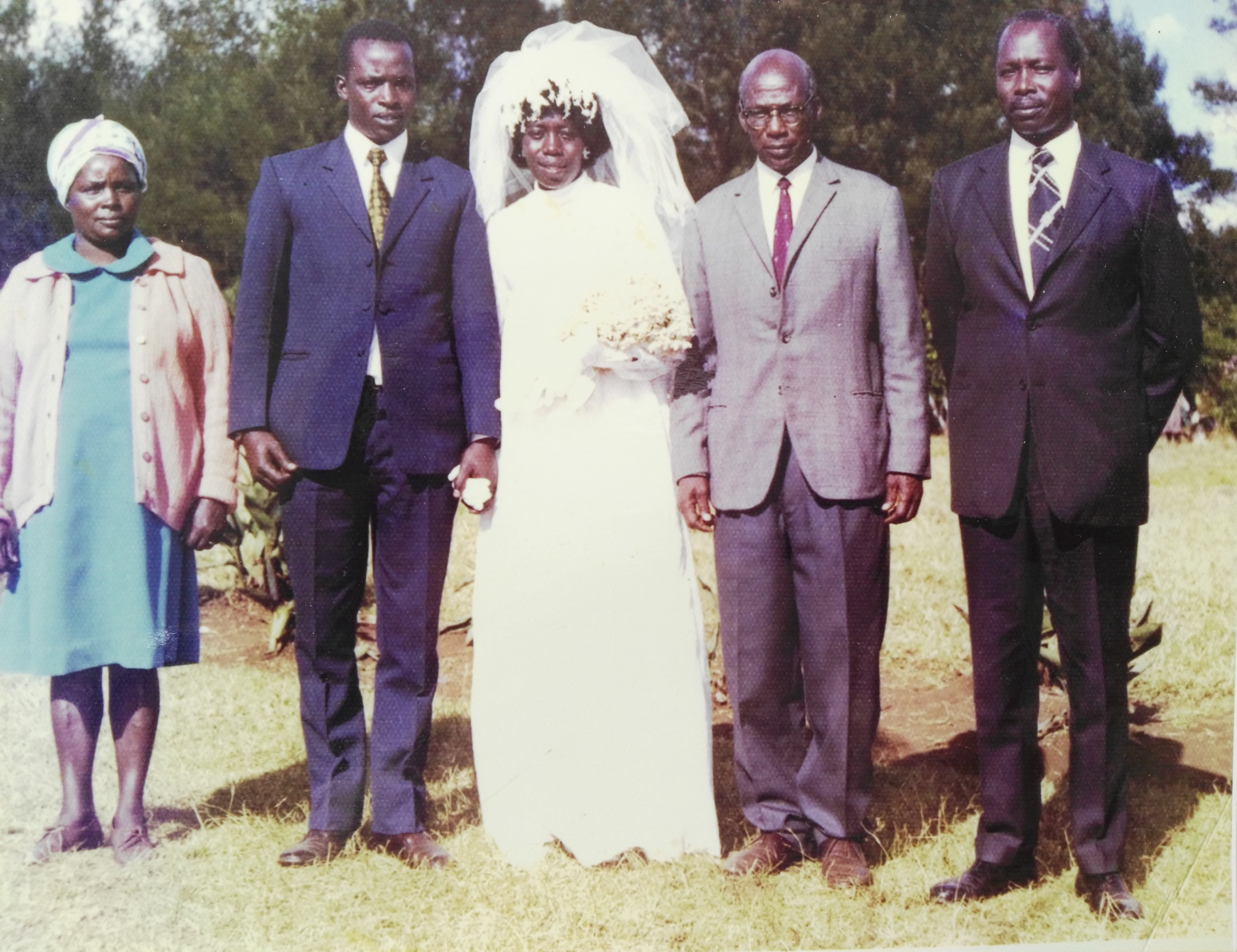
Paul Kiplimo Boit with Daniel Moi (Right) during his son's Jeremy wedding in 1972 which was held in Kapkong Primary School

He joined the Nandi African District Council in 1955 and served for nine years. In 1964 he was elected Chairman of the giant Sirikwa County Council serving until it was dissolved in 1971. Sirikwa County Council was formed of Nandi County, Uasin Gishu County, Trans Nzoia County, West Pokot County and Elgeyo Marakwet County. He then became Chairman of Wareng County Council one of five Councils split from Sirikwa covering Uasin Gishu. He was an ardent KANU kingpin and a close ally of Daniel Arap Moi. During this occasion he was awarded The Order of the Grand Warrior Award (OGW). Paul Boit was also a dedicated Christian and he initiated many AIC churches covering Nandi County, Uasin Gishu County and other areas in the North Rift Region among them being AIC Kapkong. He also participated in the activities of other denominations such as the Catholic, PCEA and others. He became the chairman of AIC Sirikwa Church Council which covered the North Rift Region.

In October 2025, President William Ruto recounted that during his early political campaigns in the 1990s, he would often introduce himself to voters as a neighbour of Paul Kiplimo Boit, who was then a well-known local leader and former chairman of the Uasin Gishu County Council. Ruto stated, “During campaigns, I used to tell people, ‘You know Paul Boit, the former county council chairman? I’m his neighbour.’ That was the closest I came to having a brand,” highlighting Boit’s local prominence and respected status in the Eldoret region at the time.

== Legacy ==
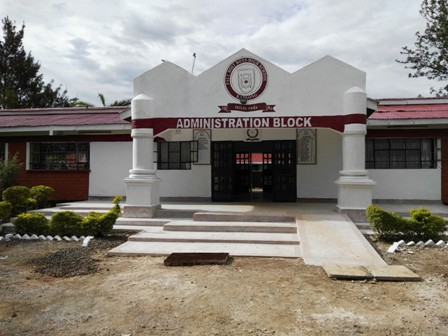
Paul Boit Boys High School Administration Block

Paul Boit served in various school boards and government institution. He also initiated his own schools such as Kapkong Primary, Paul Boit Boys High School and Sugoi Girls. He believed education was the key to empowering Kenyan thus he made all his schools public so that the community may benefit.

In addition to his contributions to education and politics, Boit also impacted the lives of individuals who later became prominent figures. President William Ruto, for instance, recalls his early experiences working on Boit's farm. In October 1984, after completing his Form 4 education, Ruto worked as a clerk at Kapkong Farm, where Boit paid him Ksh300. Ruto used his first wage to buy his first-ever brand new clothing, a pair of jeans costing Ksh137, from a shop in Eldoret Town. This experience marked a significant moment in Ruto's life, symbolizing his humble beginnings and early steps on his journey to leadership.

In recognition of Paul Boit's distinguished service to the nation, particularly through his contributions to the development of Eldoret, President William Ruto awarded him "The Order of the Burning Spear" on August 15, 2024. This occasion coincided with the launch of Eldoret as a city, a significant milestone that underscored Boit's lasting impact on the region.

== Death ==
Due to his old age he developed normal body weakness and later developed diabetes. He succumbed to the side effects of diabetes and was hospitalized in Memorial Hospital Eldoret where he died.
