= KNP =

KNP may refer to:

- Katipunan ng Nagkakaisang Pilipino, a political party in the Philippines
- Koalisyon ng Nagkakaisang Pilipino, a political alliance in the Philippines
- Kayan National Party, a political party in Myanmar
- Kenya National Party, a defunct political party in Kenya
- Catholic National Party (Katholieke Nationale Partij), a defunct political party in Netherlands
- Kinabalu National Park, Sabah, Malaysia
- Congress of the New Right (Kongres Nowej Prawicy), a political party in Poland
- Kismayo National Park, a national park in Kismayo, Somalia
- Korean National Police, the police of South Korea
- Korps Nationale Politie, the Dutch police
- Kamala Nehru Park, a park in Pune, India
