= Leonard Korir =

Kenyan-born American long-distance runner

Leonard Essau Korir
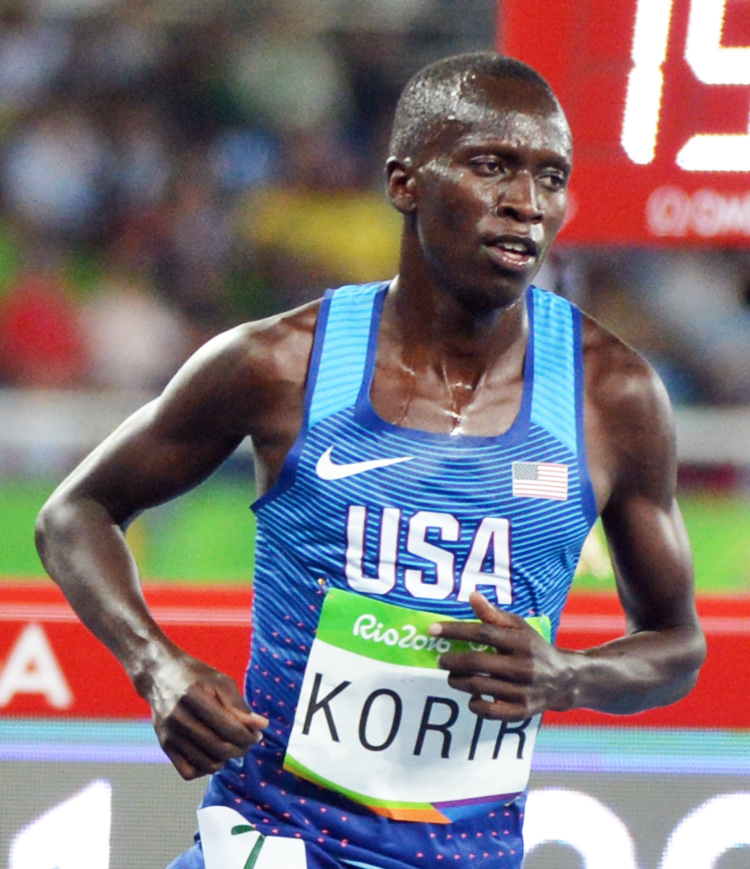
- Korir at the 2016 Olympics

Personal information
- Nationality: American
- Born: December 10, 1986 (age 39) Iten, Kenya
- Height: 1.71 m (5 ft 7 in)
- Weight: 59 kg (130 lb)

Sport
- Sport: Track
- Event: 1500 m – marathon
- College team: Iona College
- Club: U.S. Army WCAP
- Turned pro: 2013

Achievements and titles
- Personal best(s): 5000 m: 13:15.45 (2013); 10,000 m: 27:20.18 (2017); HM: 59:52 (2017)

Leonard Essau Korir (born December 10, 1986) is an American long-distance runner who competes over distances from 5000 meters to the marathon. He is a two-time NCAA champion, winning an indoor 5000 m title and outdoor 10,000 meters title in 2011 for the Iona Gaels. He gained United States citizenship and began competing for his adoptive nation in 2016.

== Career ==
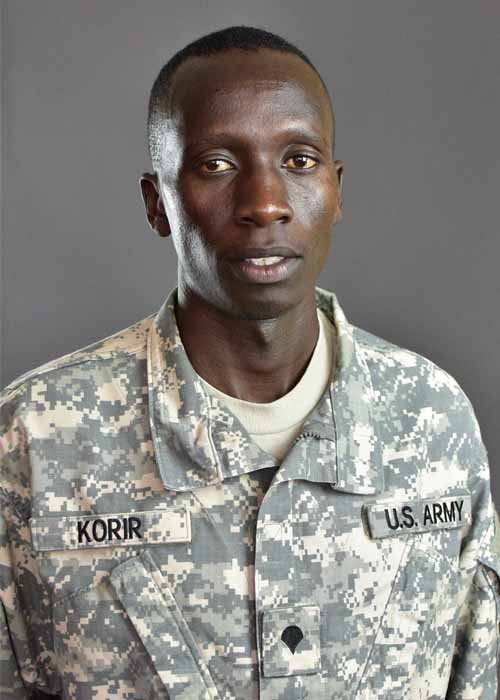
Korir in 2017

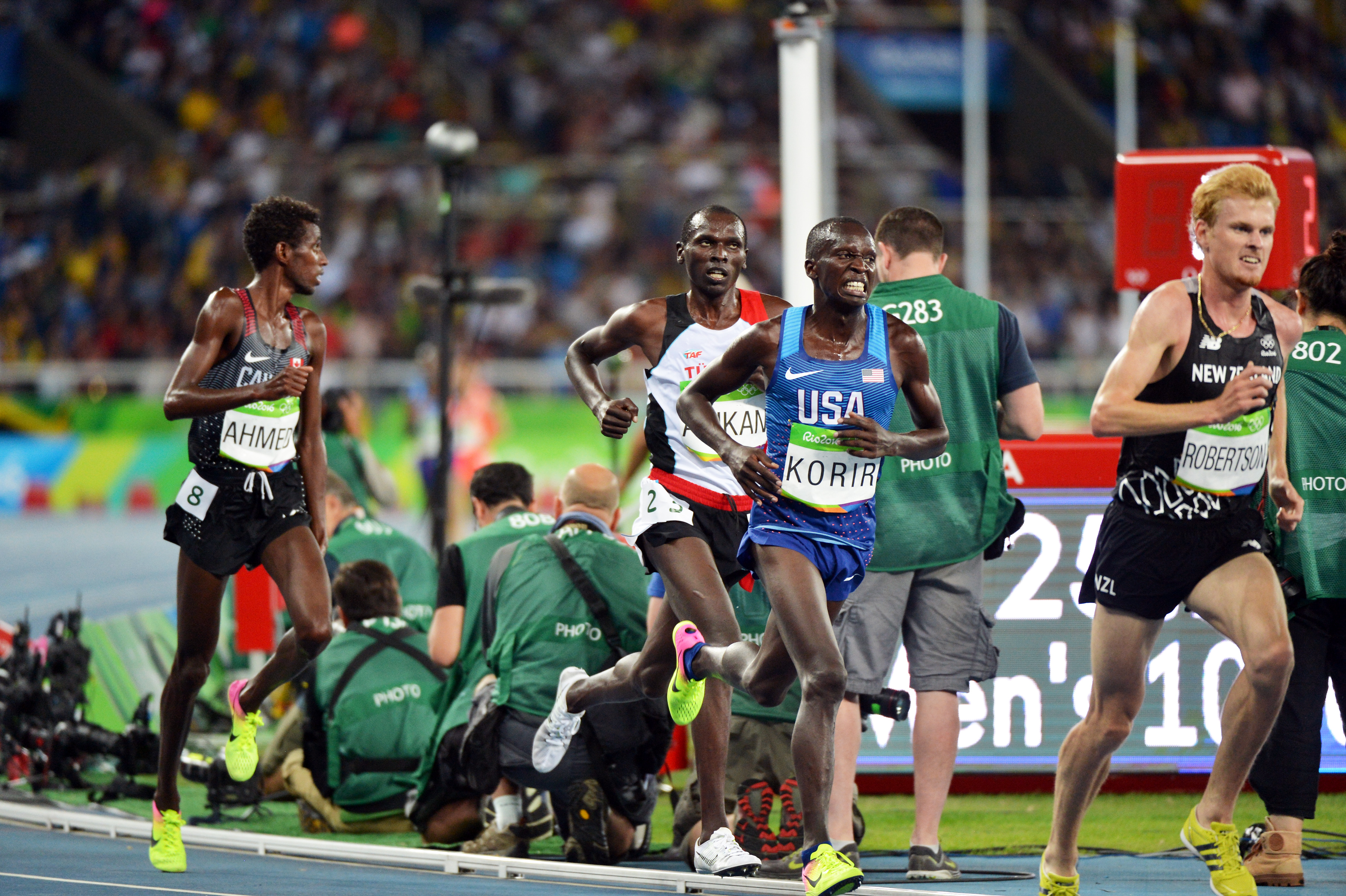
Leonard Korir and Shadrack Kipchirchir run 10,000 meters

=== Early life ===
Korir attended Tambach Teachers Training College, and it was only there, at the age of twenty, that his skill for running was identified. Strong performances by the Iten-based athlete led him to a meeting with Irish coach Colm O'Connell.

O'Connell advised him to try for an athletic scholarship at an American university and supported Korir's running efforts. He opted to study political science at Iona College, an institution he recognised as a fellow Kenyan, Richard Kiplagat, had attended there.

=== College ===
Despite his running pedigree, Korir did not excel athletically in his first year for the Iona Gaels, finishing fifth at the Metro Atlantic Athletic Conference (MAAC) cross country. However, he did reach the 10,000 meters podium in third at the 2010 MAAC Outdoor Track Championships.

His improvement was marked in his second year there: he won the MAAC Cross Country title, then took fourth at the NCAA Men's Division I Cross Country Championship after winning the regional title. In the 2011 indoor season, he won the mile run and distance medley relay MAAC titles for Iona and set a 5000 meters school record of 13:26.01 minutes to win at the NCAA Men's Division I Indoor Track and Field Championships. He won his second collegiate title at the NCAA Men's Division I Outdoor Track and Field Championships that year, topping the field over 10,000 m as well as coming third in the 5000 m. He was runner-up at the 2011 NCAA Cross Country Championships behind another Kenyan, Lawi Lalang. In his final year, he was a finalist at the 2012 NCAA Indoor Championships but didn't make the top three.

=== Professional ===
After completing his studies at Iona, he focused more on road running. He was runner-up at the Healthy Kidney 10K in 2012 and made his half marathon debut with 61:19 minutes for fourth at the 2013 New York City Half Marathon. He won the Bix 7 Road Race that same year, but was down the order at the Delhi Half Marathon in ninth. He regularly ran in lower-level American road races, with highlights including third at the 2014 Boston Half Marathon.

In 2015, a win at the New York Half Marathon in 61:06 minutes established him among the best on the American circuit, as he edged training partner Stephen Sambu by one second. He was third at the BAA 10K and won the Bix 7 Road Race for the second time. He moved back to the track in the 2016 season, achieving a win at the Stanford Invitational with a time of 27:58.65 minutes. In September 2015, Korir joined the U.S. Army as a driver.

He gained eligibility to represent the United States in May 2016. In his debut at the national level, he placed in the top three at the 2016 United States Olympic Trials behind Galen Rupp and Shadrack Kipchirchir (another former Kenyan). This achievement qualified him to place on the American Olympic team for the 2016 Summer Olympics. At the 2024 U.S. Olympic Marathon Trials, he finished third, potentially earning him a spot to represent the United States at the 2024 Paris Olympics. He was confirmed for a spot on June 6, when the third spot was unlocked and given to Korir.

== Personal records ==
Track

- 1500-meter run – 3:43.65 (2011)
- Mile run – 4:03.57 (2012)
- 3000-meter run – 7:51.40 (2011)
- Two miles – 8:22.44 (2013)
- 5000-meter run – 13:15.45 (2013)
- 10,000-meter run - 27:20.18 (2017)

Road

- 10 Miles – 46:35 (2016)
- Half marathon – 59:52 (New Delhi, 2017)
- Marathon - 2:07:56 (Amsterdam, 2019)

All information from World Athletics.

== National titles ==
- NCAA Division I Outdoor Track and Field Championships
  - 10,000 m: 2011
- NCAA Division I Indoor Track and Field Championships
  - 5000 m: 2011
