= Sacho =

Coordinates: 0°48′0″S 34°43′0″E

Sacho is a township in Baringo County, Kenya. It is located along Kabarnet - Eldama Ravine road 24 kilometres south of Kabarnet and 6 kilometres north of Tenges.

Sacho is the headquarters of Sacho division, an administrative division in Baringo County. Sacho division has a population of 11,856 (1999 census). Sacho division has the following locations: Chepkero, Kabasis, Kibonjos, Sacho Mosop and Sacho Soi. Sacho is part of Baringo county Council and Baringo Central Constituency.

Daniel arap Moi, the second president of Kenya, was born in Sacho Kurieng'wo village, near Sacho High School, a private secondary school that he later owned.
