= Kiambu Mafia =

Kenyan political alliances

The Kiambu Mafia is a pejorative term referring to a small group of the Kikuyu people primarily from the then Kiambu District of Kenya (now Kiambu and a portion of Thika District) who benefited financially and politically from Kenya African National Union (KANU) and Kenyatta taking power at independence.

These individuals earned wealth primarily in parcels of land "awarded" or “sold” to them by the government. For a number of years they were the predominant indigenous group in the Kenyan economy, controlling tea and coffee plantations, and retaining heavy influence over the tertiary sector as it developed.

Due to the influence the Kiambu mafia had, they could acquire lands from peasants in Central Province in exchange with bigger parcels of land in Rift Valley Province.

The plutocratic style adopted by the government of the day allowed them easy access to essential resources. Some of these individuals were well educated, having attended universities inside and outside Kenya. However it must be appreciated that there are individuals associated with the Kiambu Mafia not from the Kiambu district.

When Kenyatta's health started to deteriorate, the Kiambu Mafia was concerned about their continuing influence. Therefore, they decided to plan the succession in the event Kenyatta died by trying to amend the constitution so that the Vice president would not automatically hold power till the election is held. Charles Mugane Njonjo, who was one of the mafia, but differed with them due to his apparent interests in the presidency which the group members were not prepared to support, came out strongly opposing the succession talks by saying it was in fact treason to even imagine the death of a sitting president. Political analysts and historians are of the opinion that Njonjo considered Moi a weak politician and was of the view that it would be easier to take the presidency from him rather than any of the Kiambu mafia.

When Moi came into power in 1978, he abolished all the "tribal" movements but his main aim was the GEMA, some of whose members were part of the Kiambu mafia as he was not comfortable with the wealth and power its members controlled.
