= Kenya Independence Movement =

Defunct political party in Kenya

The Kenya Independence Movement (KIM) was a political party in Kenya.

== History ==
The KIM was established in August 1959 by African members of the Legislative Council, and was led by Julius Gikonyo Kiano, Tom Mboya and Jaramogi Oginga Odinga. Primarily a Kikuyu and Luo party, its formation was a response to the establishment of the multiracial Kenya National Party, and membership was restricted to Africans. The two also differed on independence, with the KIM demanding it by 1961, whilst the KNP had settled on 1968.

However, by the end of 1959 supporters of the two merged in order to present a united front at the Lancaster House Conference. The following year the KIM's leadership established the Kenya African National Union through a merger with the Kenya African Union and the National People's Convention Party, whilst the KNP merged with other parties to form the rival Kenya African Democratic Union.
