= Ndeiya =

Ndeiya is located in Kiambu County, Kenya, and is near the Great Rift Valley. The name is derived from a Maasai word.

== Geography ==
The region stretches nearly 55 kilometres (34 mi) from the lower Ngong hills area ("Kibiku") to the Mutarakwa Mai Mahiu road, and falls under the Kikuyu/Kabete and Limuru constituencies. The area adjacent to Maasai plain is quite scenic with undulating hills and valleys. It is a famous rock climbing venue.

After the Independent Electoral Boundaries Commission demarcation of 2010, the word Ndeiya refers to the ward itself which covers the areas of Ng'amba, Mungetho, Mirithu, Tiekunu, Thigio, Rwa Mburi, Githungucu, Rwacumari, Nderu, Nyataragi, Kiriri and Kiawanda.

Some areas in Ndeiya region include Gikambura, Ruthigiti, Kamangu, Kianjagi, Migumoini, Kanyayo, Ng'amba, Renguti, Karabuta, Gatune, Rwanyaga, Nachu, Nguirobi, Gitutha, Nduthi, Kiriri, Kiawanda, Thigio, Githarane, Mung'etho, Nderu, Mirithu, Tiekunu, Kiandutu and Githunguchu.

== Demographics ==
Ndeiya lies on the border between the territories of the Kikuyu and Maasai people. Research shows that many people in Ndeiya have some Maasai blood, as the two communities had some close links. Ndeiya people are mostly those of Kikuyu origin' but other tribes and races can be found there.

People from Ndeiya region include the first African member of the Legco, Hon. Eliud Mathu, Freedom fighter Kung'u Karumba, current Limuru M.P., Hon Arch. Peter Mungai Mwathi; former M.Ps. Hon. Simon Ngigi Mwaura, the late Hon. Simon Kuria Kanyingi, Hon. George Nyanja; Paul Gitau, ornithologist; Karanja Nyoro; Mr. Arthur Mwenja Gaceru, an Education Officer Kirinyaga and later on Kiambu, Prof Paul N.Mbugua, Prof University of Nairobi; Dr Paul Karanja Mbugua, pharmacist and managing director of MacNaughton Ltd. The area is home to prominent individuals in multiple fields with some notable figures being; Mbote Njogu(a comedian), Peter Muchendu(a governor), Sam Mwaniki(an academic advocate), Patrick Kiongo(a public administrator), Edwin Mwenja (a businessman), Nelson Mbuiyu(area MCA From Thigio), the incoming MCA George Njung'e, among others.

A unique settlement feature in Ndeiya is the existence of the Emergency Villages that were established under colonial rule in 1950s. The villages include Ndioni, Nderu (Royal), Mung'etho, Thigio, and Ruthigiti. The residents of the villages are landless and not endowed with significant means of gainful employment. Consequently, Ndeiya is not food secure.

== Facilities ==
The region has many schools, among them primary and secondary schools. Several boreholes have been sunk, and clean water for domestic consumption is adequate. Fluorine content of the water is high, and there is a prevalence of dental fluorosis in the area.

Supply of electricity is good, with most trading centres connected to the National Grid. The main road to Ndeiya can be accessed from Kikuyu and Limuru. There is also a route from Ngong hills and Dagoretti. Much of Ndeiya is semi-arid, and is therefore considered a hardship area. Before the collapse of the pyrethrum industry in Kenya, pyrethrum was a major cash crop in Ndeiya. Poultry farming has been carried out, though not to a large scale. Subsistence farming is common and the unemployment level is high.

Public primary schools in Ndeiya

These are the primary schools in Thigio, Ndeiya.

Kĩrĩrĩ, Gĩtutha, Tutu, Gatũũra, Thigio, Kĩawanda, Makutano, Nderu, Tiekunu, Bibirioni, Rwambũri, Nyataragi.

== Mau Mau Mass Graves ==
Ndeiya is home to mass graves of victims of the torturous actions of the British officers during the Mau Mau uprising which was fighting for Kenya's independence and land rights for Africans. Ndeiya and Thigio are mentioned in Caroline Elkins' books Britain's Gulag: The Brutal End of Empire in Kenya and Imperial Reckoning: The Untold Story of Britain's Gulag as imprisonment camps where suspects were brutally tortured, sexually abused, starved, and over-worked and killed as part of the suppression efforts against the fight for independence.

Though they have not been gazetted as part of the sites and monuments in Kenya or recognized as centres of national or historical interests, the mass graves continue to attract history tourists and researchers. The graves are located on private land whose owners are prevented from farming or construction by laws and cultural taboos that prohibit exhumation of bodies and disturbance of grave sites. There have been proposals and promises to compensate and relocated the landowners in exchange for setting up memorial sites.
