= Kenya National Party =

Former political party in Kenya

The Kenya National Party (KNP) was a political party in Kenya.

== History ==
The KNP was established in July 1959 as a multiracial party consisting of African, Arab, European and Indian members of the Legislative Council, led by Masinde Muliro. Several prominent politicians joined the party, including Daniel arap Moi, Ronald Ngala and Taaitta Toweett. Its members were opposed to the overbearing behaviour of Tom Mboya, who set up the Kenya Independence Movement (KIM) in response to the KNP's formation.

However, by November 1959 the party was no longer multiracial, and by the end of the year, had joined with the KIM to present a united front at the Lancaster House Conference. After the conference the KNP was briefly relaunched as the Kenya African People's Party (KAPP) before merging with several other parties in June 1960 to form the Kenya African Democratic Union, whilst the KIM merged into the rival Kenya African National Union.
