= Tambach Teachers Training College =

Tambach Teachers College is a college in Tambach, Elgeyo-Marakwet County, Kenya. It is one of the 20 public primary teachers colleges in Kenya and among the last five of such institutions constructed in the late 1980s by the government of Kenya through the support of the World Bank. The college is situated in the Kerio escarpment section of Elgeyo-Marakwet County along the Eldoret-Kabarnet road. The college is 43 km from Eldoret and 11 km from Iten, the District Headquarters.

The college opened its doors to the first batch of 372 students in September 1991. These comprised nine classes, six of the P1 grade, two of P2 and one of P3 grade. Since 1996, the college has been training only P1 students.

== History ==
Teacher training at Tambach started in the 1940s. The course was offered at what was then known as Government African School Tambach at the site of the present day Tambach High School, which was started in 1928. The college then trained teachers of T3 and T4 grades.

It was here that the retired President Daniel Arap Moi served as a tutor and head of the institution between 1948 and 1955 when he left teaching to join the colonial legislative council following his election as the council's Rift Valley representative.

In 1957, the name of the institution was changed to Tambach Training College. In 1964, the college was amalgamated with Mosoriot Teachers College following the recommendations of the Ominde Education Commission on Teachers Training.

Tambach, therefore, ceased to be a Teachers' college and gave way to be the first form one class intake that marked the beginning of the present day Tambach high school. The school still uses many of the former college buildings including staff houses. Among latter is the one that former President Moi lived in.

== Facilities ==
The World Bank-funded, Chinese-constructed Teachers College stands in a 80-acre (320,000 $\ce{m^2}$) escarpment site. Its facilities include a two-storey, star-shaped main complex and a multi-use theatre hall with a capacity of 1,000.

Within the college complex are 18 classrooms, two science laboratories, two home science rooms (for serving and cooking), art and craft and agriculture workshops, a seminar room and an ICT laboratory.

There is also a learning resource centre (L.R.C) which contains a library, a teaching aids display room, and three audio visual rooms, one of which is a complete studio.

The administration block, at the entrance of the complex has several offices and a board room on the ground floor. On the first floor are workrooms for the members of the teaching staff.

On both sides of the complex are hostels for men and women. Large students' common rooms are attached to each of the sets of hostels which are separated by a dining hall and a kitchen.

The staff quarters are some 300 meters away. These comprise 13 three-bedroom, 26 two-bedroom mansions, and two long flats of six two-bedroom apartments.

Between the staff quarters and the main complex is a football pitch complete with a race track. Beside it is a store-cum-parking bay for the college vehicles.

== Principals ==
Since its inception, the college has been under the administration of five principals.

- Mr. Nathaniel Chepkener: 1991 to 1998
- Mr. Elias Komen: September 1998 to December 1998
- Mr. Paul Ngetich: 1999 to Jan 2006
- Mr. John C.A. Kingoo: January 2006 to April 2012
- Mr. William K. Maritim May 2012 to date
