= Ngecha =

- Location within Kenya
- Coordinates: 1.17°S 36.67°E
- Country: Kenya
- Province: Central Province
- Time zone: UTC+3 (EAT)

Ngecha is a settlement in Kenya's Central Province.
