= 1979 Kenyan general election =

Election in Kenya

1979 Kenyan presidential election
← 1978	November 8, 1979	1983 →
President before election
Daniel Arap Moi
Elected President
Daniel Arap Moi

General elections were held in Kenya on 8 November 1979. At the time, the country was a de facto one-party state with the Kenya African National Union being the sole party to participate in the election. A total of 742 KANU candidates stood for the 158 National Assembly seats, with more than half of the incumbents (including seven ministers) defeated. Voter turnout was 67.3%. Although the post of President of Kenya was due to be elected at the same time as the National Assembly, Daniel arap Moi was the sole candidate and was automatically elected without a vote being held. Following the elections, a further 12 members were appointed by President Moi.

== Results ==
Party	Votes	%	Seats	+/–
Kenya African National Union	3,733,537	100.00	158	0
Appointed members			12	0
Total	3,733,537	100.00	170	0
Valid votes	3,733,537	98.45		
Invalid/blank votes	58,956	1.55		
Total votes	3,792,493	100.00		
Registered voters/turnout	5,602,110	67.70		
Source: IPU
