= James Gichuru =

Kenyan politician

The Honourable James Gìchūrū E.G.H.

Acting Chairman of the Kenya African National Union (KANU)
- In office 1960–1961
- Succeeded by: Jomo Kenyatta

Personal details
- Born: James Gìchūrū; 1914 Thogoto, Kiambu, Kenya
- Died: 1982 (aged 67–68)
- Party: Kenya African National Union (KANU)

James Samuel Gìchūrū (1914–1982) was a Kenyan politician. He was a Minister of Finance, Minister of Defence and a former member of parliament for Limuru Constituency. He was among the founders of the Kenya African National Union (KANU) party in 1960 as well as its acting chairman (for jailed Jomo Kenyatta) to 1961.
