= Kamburu =

- Location within Kenya
- Coordinates: 1.03°S 36.73°E
- Country: Kenya
- Province: Central Province
- Time zone: UTC+3 (EAT)

Kamburu is a settlement in Kenya's Central Province.

Kamburu is a Sub location within Gatamaiyu Location, Lari district and in Kiambu County The major economic activities of the area include dairy farming, and tea farming. Primary schools within Kamburu include Kamburu Primary School, Gathima primary school and Nyamuthanga primary school. There are also secondary schools like the Kamburu Secondary school, Gathima Secondary School and Kahunira Secondary School. The chief's camp sits on the road that connects Kamburu and Githnguri. Many residents in Kamburu prefer commuting to Githunguri in order to access services like health services, administrative services etc.

Another major feature is Ruiru Dam. The supplies Nairobi residents with a small portion of Water
