= 1983 Kenyan general election =

1983 Kenyan presidential election
← 1979	September 26, 1983	1988 →
President before election
Daniel Arap Moi
Elected President
Daniel Arap Moi

General elections were held in Kenya on 26 September 1983. At the time, the country was a one-party state with the Kenya African National Union having been made the sole party the previous year (though the country had been a de facto one-party state since 1969). More than 750 KANU candidates stood for the 158 National Assembly seats, with around 40% of incumbents (including some ministers) defeated. Voter turnout was 45.9%. Although the post of President of Kenya was due to be elected at the same time as the National Assembly, Daniel arap Moi was the sole candidate and was automatically elected without a vote being held. Following the elections, a further 12 members were appointed by President Moi.

== Results ==
Party	Votes	%	Seats	+/–
Kenya African National Union	3,331,047	100.00	158	0
Appointed members			12	0
Total	3,331,047	100.00	170	0
Valid votes	3,331,047	98.12		
Invalid/blank votes	63,676	1.88		
Total votes	3,394,723	100.00		
Registered voters/turnout	7,035,583	48.25		
Source: IPU
