= Daniel arap Moi =

President of Kenya from 1978 to 2002

His Excellency Daniel arap Moi CGH
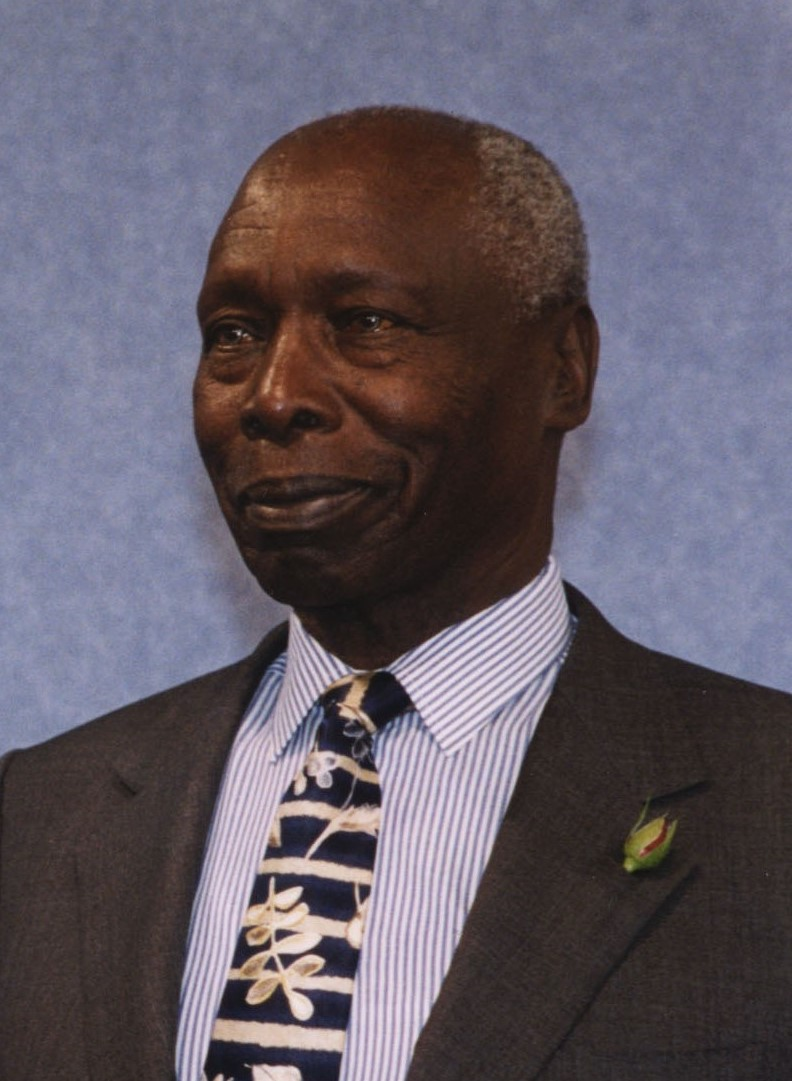
- Moi in 1999

2nd President of Kenya
- In office 22 August 1978 – 30 December 2002; Acting to 14 October 1978
- Vice President: Mwai Kibaki; Josephat Karanja; George Saitoti; Musalia Mudavadi
- Preceded by: Jomo Kenyatta
- Succeeded by: Mwai Kibaki

Chairperson of the OAU
- In office 24 June 1981 – 6 June 1983
- Preceded by: Siaka Stevens
- Succeeded by: Mengistu Haile Mariam

3rd Vice President of Kenya
- In office 5 January 1967 – 22 August 1978
- President: Jomo Kenyatta
- Preceded by: Joseph Murumbi
- Succeeded by: Mwai Kibaki

Minister for Home Affairs
- In office 28 December 1964 – 9 April 1978
- President: Jomo Kenyatta

Member of Parliament
- In office 5 December 1963 – 20 December 2002
- Succeeded by: Gideon Moi
- Constituency: Baringo North (1963–1967); Baringo Central (1967–2002)

Personal details
- Born: Toroitich Arap Moi; 2 September 1924 Sacho, Baringo, Kenya Colony
- Died: 4 February 2020 (aged 95) Nairobi, Kenya
- Party: KANU; KADU (1960–1964)
- Spouse: Lena Bomett (m. 1950; sep. 1974)
- Children: 8, including Jonathan Toroitich and Gideon
- Education: Tambach TTC
- Profession: Teacher
- Awards: Silver World Award (1981)

Daniel Toroitich arap Moi (/ˈmoʊiː/ MOH-ee; 2 September 1924 – 4 February 2020) was a Kenyan politician who served as the second president of Kenya from 1978 to 2002. He is the country's longest-serving president to date. Moi previously served as the third vice president of Kenya from 1967 to 1978 under President Jomo Kenyatta, becoming the president following the latter's death.

Born into the Tugen sub-group of the Kalenjin people in the Kenyan Rift Valley, Moi studied as a boy at the Africa Inland Mission school before training as a teacher at the Tambach teachers training college, working in that profession until 1955. He then entered politics and was elected a member of the Legislative Council for Rift Valley. As independence approached, Moi joined the Kenyan delegation which travelled to London for the Lancaster House Conferences, where the country's first post-independence constitution was drafted. In 1960, he founded the Kenya African Democratic Union (KADU) as a rival party to Kenyatta's Kenya African National Union (KANU). Following independence in 1963, Kenyatta who became Prime Minister and later President of the new nation, convinced Moi to merge the two parties. Kenyatta appointed Moi to his government in 1964 and then promoted him to vice-president in 1967. Despite opposition from a Kikuyu elite known as the Kiambu Mafia, Kenyatta retained Moi as his vice president. Moi took over as president when Kenyatta died in 1978.

Initially popular both nationally and in Western countries, who saw his regime as countering against influences from the Eastern Bloc-aligned governments of Ethiopia and Tanzania, Moi's popularity fell around 1990 as the economy stagnated after the end of the Cold War. Following the agitation and external pressure, he was forced to allow multiparty elections in 1991. He then led his party, KANU, to victory in the 1992 and 1997 elections, both of which have generally been regarded as neither free nor fair by independent observers. Constitutionally barred from seeking a third term, Moi chose Uhuru Kenyatta as his successor, but Kenyatta was defeated by opposition leader Mwai Kibaki in the 2002 general election, and Kibaki succeeded Moi as president. Kenyatta would eventually win the presidency in the 2013 election.

Moi's regime was deemed dictatorial especially before 1992 when Kenya was a one-party state. Human rights organisations such as Amnesty International, as well as a special investigation by the United Nations, accused Moi of human rights abuses during his presidency. Inquiries held after the end of his presidency found evidence that Moi and his sons had engaged in significant levels of corruption, including the 1990s Goldenberg scandal.

== Early life and entry into politics ==
Moi was born Toroitich arap (son of) Moi, Toroitich meaning "welcome home the cattle", in the Rift Valley village of Kuriengwo, which is now in Sacho division of Baringo County. Moi's father, Kimoi arap Chebii, died in 1928. Moi was only four then and little is known about his mother, Kabon. What is known is that Tuitoek, his elder brother, became his guardian. He proceeded to live with the Chesire family, his relatives, under the matriarch, Elizabeth Chesire. Reuben Chesire and Zipporah Kittony grew up with him at the home. Moi was one of the herdsboys from Sacho location recommended to join the new Africa Inland Mission (AIM) School at Kabartonjo in 1934 before it was shifted to Kapsabet. He was from the Tugen sub-group of the Kalenjin people.

At the African Mission School at Kabartonjo, Moi became a Christian and adopted the name Daniel. Moi attended Tambach Teachers Training College after its relocation from Kabartonjo from 1945 to 1947. This is after the colonial government denied him a chance to enroll at Alliance High School. He later attended Kagumo Teacher's College, and taught classes at Tambach Teacher's Training College. Later he became the headmaster of a school in the Keiyo District. He worked as a teacher from 1946 until 1955.

Moi entered politics in 1955 when he was elected Member of the Legislative Council for Rift Valley. He was the chosen replacement of Dr. John ole Tameno, the former representative who had had to quit due to heavy drinking and suspected connections to the freedom movement. In 1957 Moi was re-elected Member of the Legislative Council for Rift Valley. Moi was part of the Kenyan delegation at the Lancaster House Conferences in London, which drafted the country's first post-independence constitution, and in 1961, he became Minister of Education in the pre-independence government.

In 1960 he founded the Kenya African Democratic Union (KADU) with Ronald Ngala as a political alternative to the Kenya African National Union (KANU) led by Jomo Kenyatta. KADU pressed for a federalist constitution, while KANU was in favour of a centralized government. The advantage lay with the numerically stronger KANU, and the first post-independence constitution emphasised national unity, structuring the country as a unitary state.

== Vice-Presidency ==
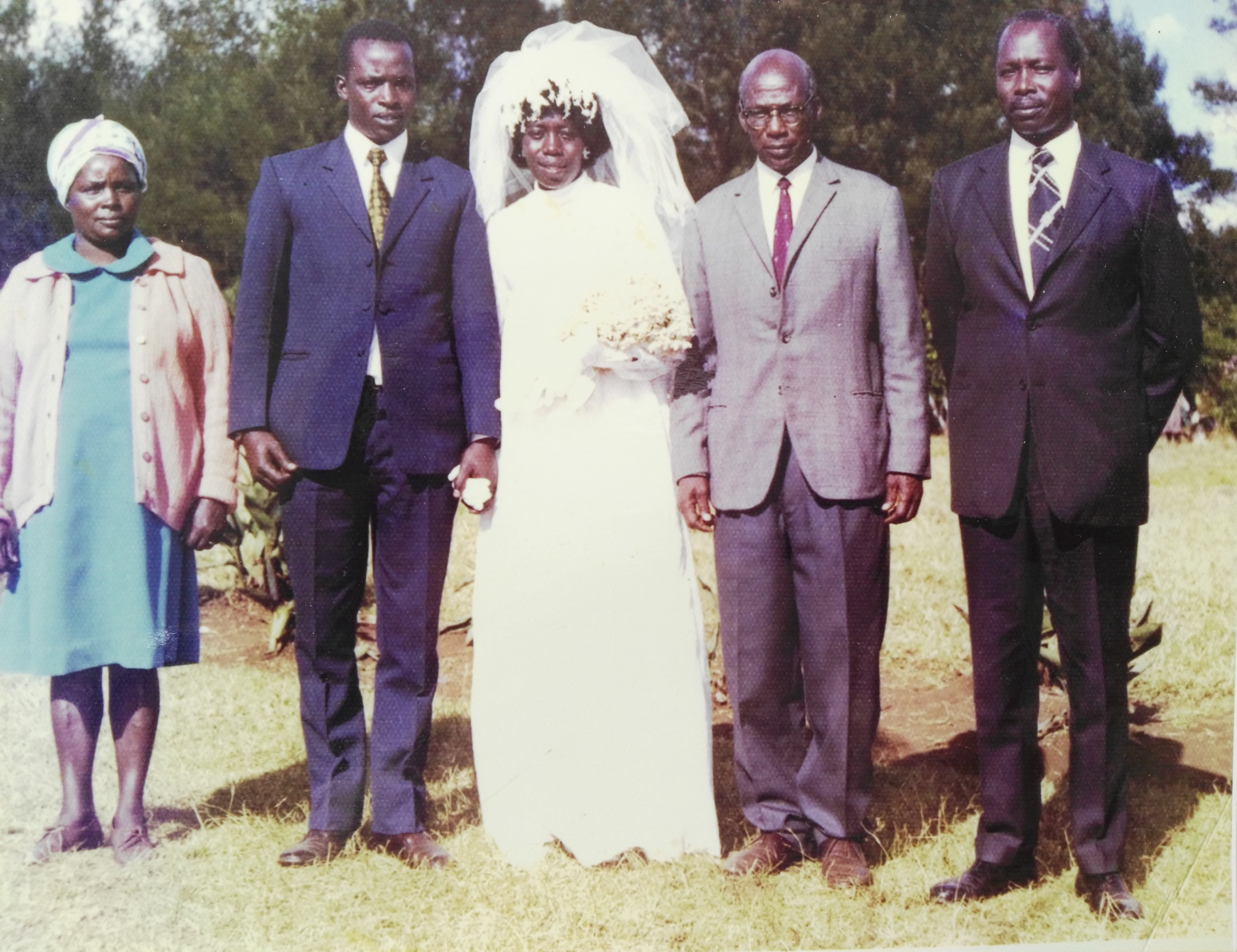
Paul Kiplimo Boit with Daniel arap Moi during his son's wedding in 1972, which was held in Kapkong Primary School

After Kenya gained independence on 12 December 1963, Kenyatta convinced Moi that KADU and KANU should merge to complete the process of decolonisation. Accordingly, KADU dissolved and joined KANU in 1964. The only real challenge to KANU's dominance came from the Kenya People's Union, starting in 1966. That party was banned in 1969, and from that point onward Kenya was a de facto one-party state dominated by the Kĩkũyũ-Luo alliance. However, with an eye on the fertile lands of the Rift Valley populated by members of Moi's Kalenjin tribe, Kenyatta secured their support by first promoting Moi to Minister for Home Affairs in 1964, and then to Vice-President in 1967. As a member of a minority tribe Moi was also an acceptable compromise for the major tribes. Moi was elected to the Kenyan parliament in 1963 from Baringo North. From 1966 until his retirement in 2002, he served as the MP for Baringo Central in addition to his various other offices.

However, Moi faced opposition from the tribe Kikuyu elite known as the Kiambu Mafia, who would have preferred one of their own to accede to the presidency. This resulted in an attempt by the constitutional drafting group to change the constitution to prevent the vice-president automatically assuming power in the event of the president's death. However, many senior Kikuyu politicians, including Mwai Kibaki and Charles Njonjo, as well as Kenyatta himself, opposed such a change to the order of succession, fearing it might lead to political instability if Kenyatta died, given his advanced age and perennial illnesses. Thus, Moi's position as successor to Kenyatta was safeguarded.

== Presidency ==
Presidential Standard of Daniel Toroitich arap Moi

When Jomo Kenyatta died on 22 August 1978, Moi became the acting president. Per the Constitution, a special presidential election for the balance of Kenyatta's term was to be held on 8 November, 90 days later. However, a Cabinet meeting decided that no one else was interested in running for presidency, thus various politicians began campaigning across the country for Moi to be declared the president unopposed. He was therefore sworn in as the second President of Kenya on 14 October 1978 as a result of the walkover electoral process. Upon becoming president, Moi promised (as noted by one journal) "to conduct an open, democratic government and lead the country into a new era of African socialism."

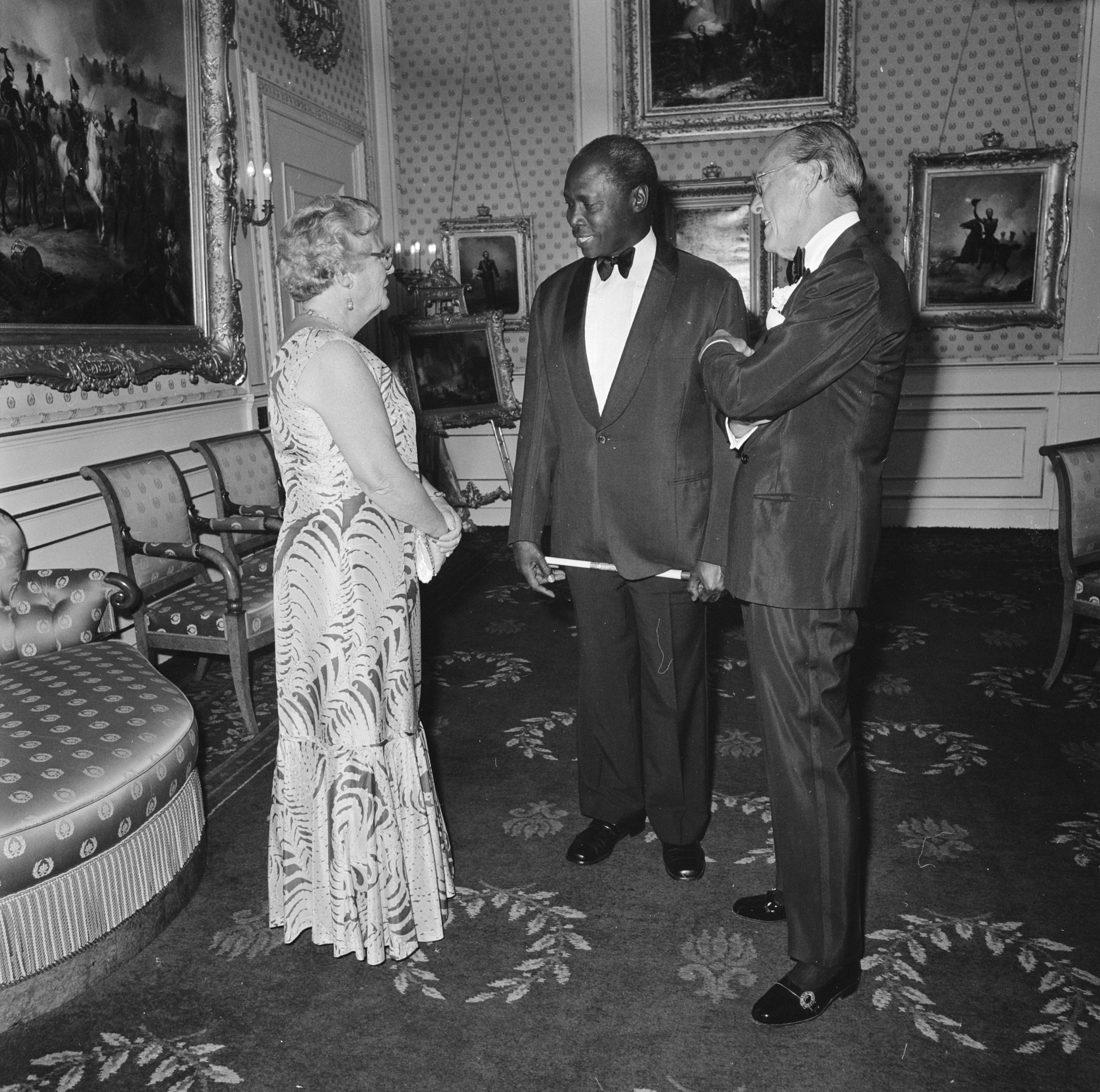
Moi with Queen Juliana and Prince Bernhard during his state visit to the Netherlands in June 1979

In the beginning, Moi was popular with widespread support all over the country. He toured the country and came into contact with the people everywhere, which was in great contrast to Kenyatta's imperious style of leadership from behind closed doors. However, political realities dictated that he would continue to be beholden to the system of government that Kenyatta had created and to whose headship he had acceded, including the nearly dictatorial powers vested in his office. Despite his popularity, Moi was still unable to fully consolidate his power. From the beginning, anti-communism was an important theme of Moi's government; speaking on the new President's behalf, Vice-President Mwai Kibaki bluntly stated, "There is no room for Communists in Kenya."

On 1 August 1982, lower-level Air Force personnel, led by Senior Private Grade-I Hezekiah Ochuka and backed by university students, attempted a coup d'état to oust Moi. The revolt was quickly suppressed by military and police forces commanded by Chief of General Staff Mahamoud Mohamed. There may have been two or even three independent groups attempting to seize power at the same time, for differing reasons, but the most serious was led by prominent Kikuyu politicians and members of the police and armed forces.

Moi took the opportunity to dismiss political opponents and consolidate his power. He reduced the influence of Kenyatta's men in the cabinet through a long-running judicial enquiry that resulted in the identification of key Kenyatta men as traitors. Moi pardoned them but not before establishing their traitor status in the public view. The main conspirators in the coup, including Ochuka, were sentenced to death, marking the last judicial executions in Kenya. Moi appointed loyalists to key positions and changed the constitution to formally make KANU the only legally permitted party in the country. But this made little difference to the political situation, as all significant opposition parties had been outlawed since 1969. Kenya's academics and other intelligentsia did not accept this and educational institutions across the country became sites of movements that sought to introduce democratic reforms. However, Kenyan secret police infiltrated these groups and many of their members were exiled. Marxism could no longer be taught at Kenyan universities. The remaining opposition at home went underground.

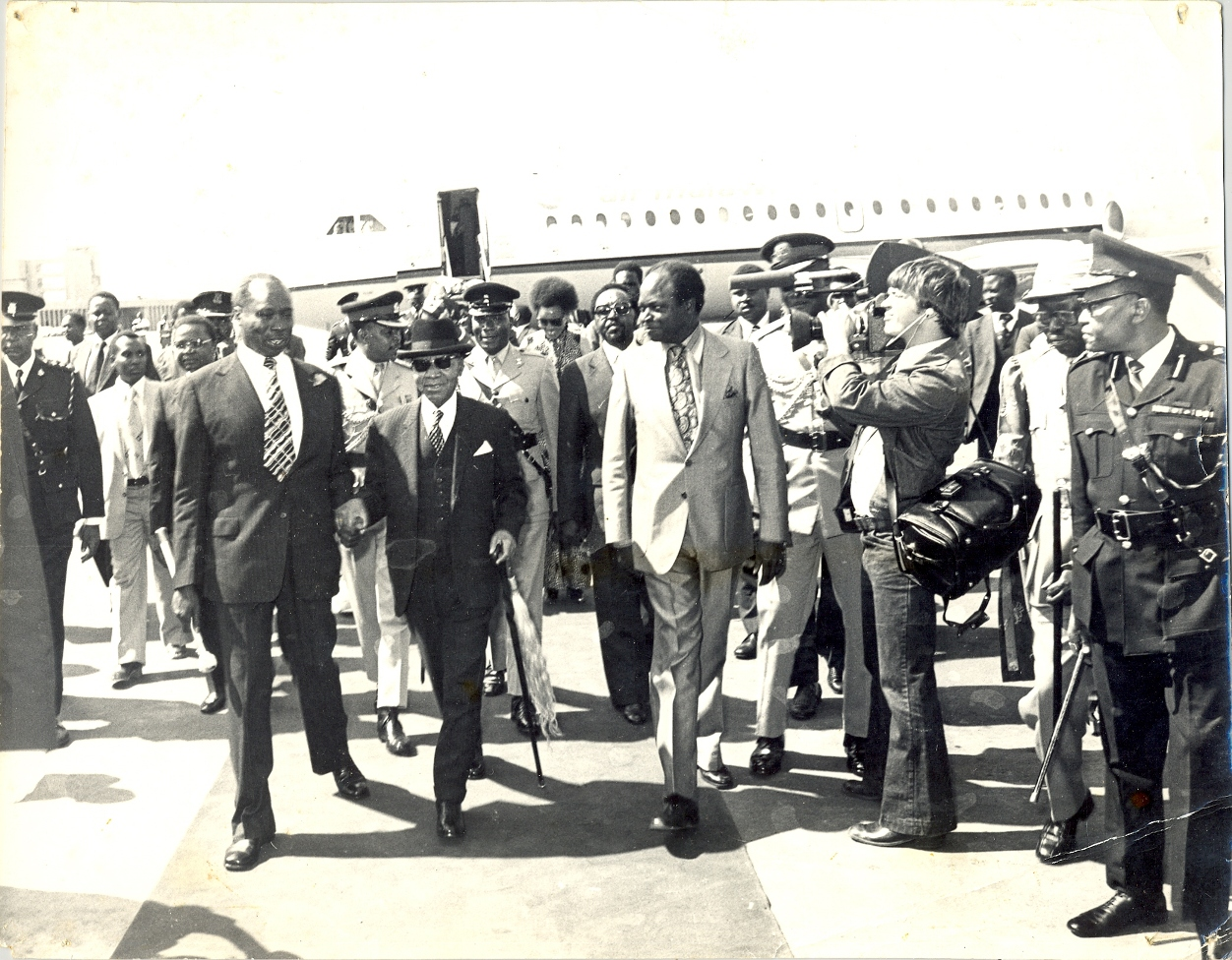
Moi welcoming Hastings Banda to Kenya

Starting in the late 1980s, Moi's regime faced the end of the Cold War, as well as a national economic stagnation under rising oil prices and falling prices of agricultural commodities. Western governments also became more hostile to the KANU regime, a change of policy from the time of the Cold War, when Kenya had been viewed as an important regional stabilizer, preventing the spread of Soviet influence beyond Ethiopia, Somalia, and Tanzania. During that time, Kenya had received much foreign aid, and the country was accepted as a stable, if authoritarian, regime with Moi and the KANU firmly in charge. Western allies overlooked the increasing degree of political repression, including the use of torture at the infamous Nyayo House torture chambers. Some of the evidence of these torture cells was exposed in 2003 after opposition leader Mwai Kibaki became president.

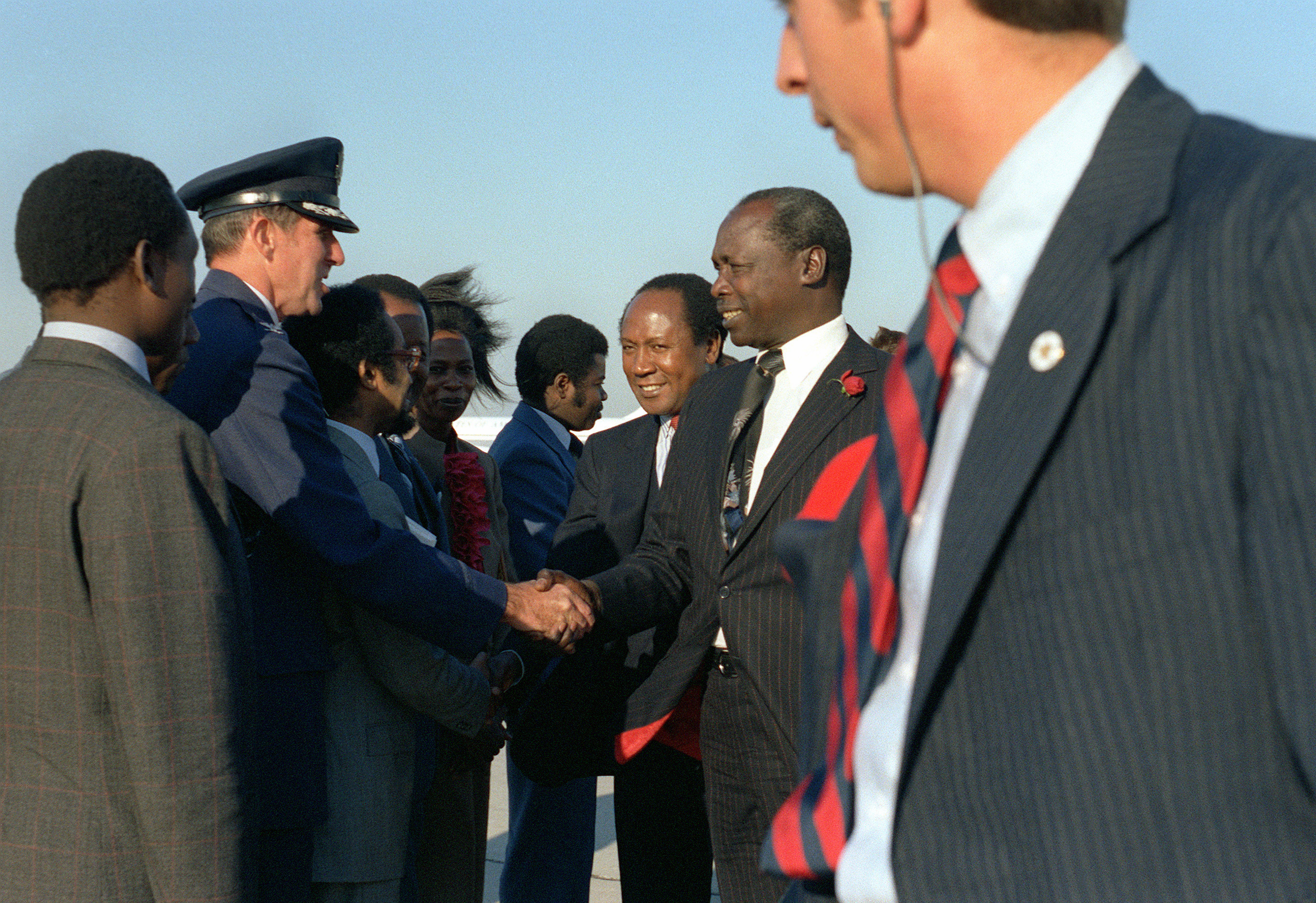
Daniel arap Moi of Kenya is welcomed upon his arrival for a visit to the United States on 28 September 1981.

With the fall of the Soviet Union and a lessening need to counter socialist influence in the region, Western policymakers changed their attitude toward Moi and other pro-Western Third World authoritarian regimes. They increasingly regarded Moi as a despotic ruler rather than an important regional stabilizer. Foreign aid was withheld pending compliance with economic and political reforms. One of the key conditions imposed on his regime, especially by the United States through fiery ambassador Smith Hempstone, was the restoration of a multi-party system. Despite his own lack of enthusiasm for the reintroduction of a multi-party system, Moi managed to win over his party who were against the reform. Moi announced his intention to repeal Section 2(A) of the constitution, lifting the ban on opposition parties, at a KANU conference in Kasarani in December 1991. Despite fierce debate and opposition from many delegates, the conference passed the motion unanimously.

Regardless of the presence of opposition parties, Moi and the KANU clinched power in the first multi-party elections in 1992, and once again in 1997. Both elections were marred by political violence on both the government and opposition forces. Moi skillfully exploited Kenya's mix of ethnic tensions in these contests, gaining a plurality in both elections through a mix of picking votes across the country while his opponents' support was more concentrated, attracting votes from smaller tribes, and the Luhya, and taking advantage of fears of Kikuyu domination over the non-Kikuyu majority. In the absence of an effective and organised opposition, Moi had no difficulty in winning. Although it is also suspected that electoral fraud may have occurred, the key to his victory in both elections was a divided opposition. In 1992 he polled 36.3% of the votes, and in 1997 he received 40.4%, but both were comfortable victories due to vote-splitting between the various opposition groups, which failed to unify and field one opposition candidate.

== Criticism and corruption allegations ==
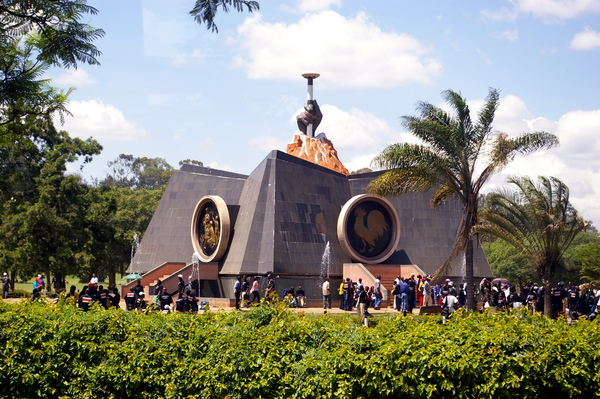
Nyayo Monument, located in Central Park in Nairobi, was built in 1988 to commemorate the 10-year anniversary of Daniel Arap Moi's presidency.

In 1999, the findings of NGOs like Amnesty International and a special investigation by the United Nations were published, and they indicated that human rights abuses were prevalent in Kenya under the Moi regime.

Reporting on corruption and human rights abuses by British reporter Mary Anne Fitzgerald from 1987 to 1988 resulted in her being vilified by the government and finally deported. Moi was implicated in the 1990s' Goldenberg scandal and subsequent cover-ups, where the Kenyan government subsidised exports of gold far in excess of the foreign currency earnings of exporters. In this case, the gold was smuggled from Congo, as Kenya has negligible gold reserves. The Goldenberg scandal cost Kenya the equivalent of more than 10% of the country's annual GDP.

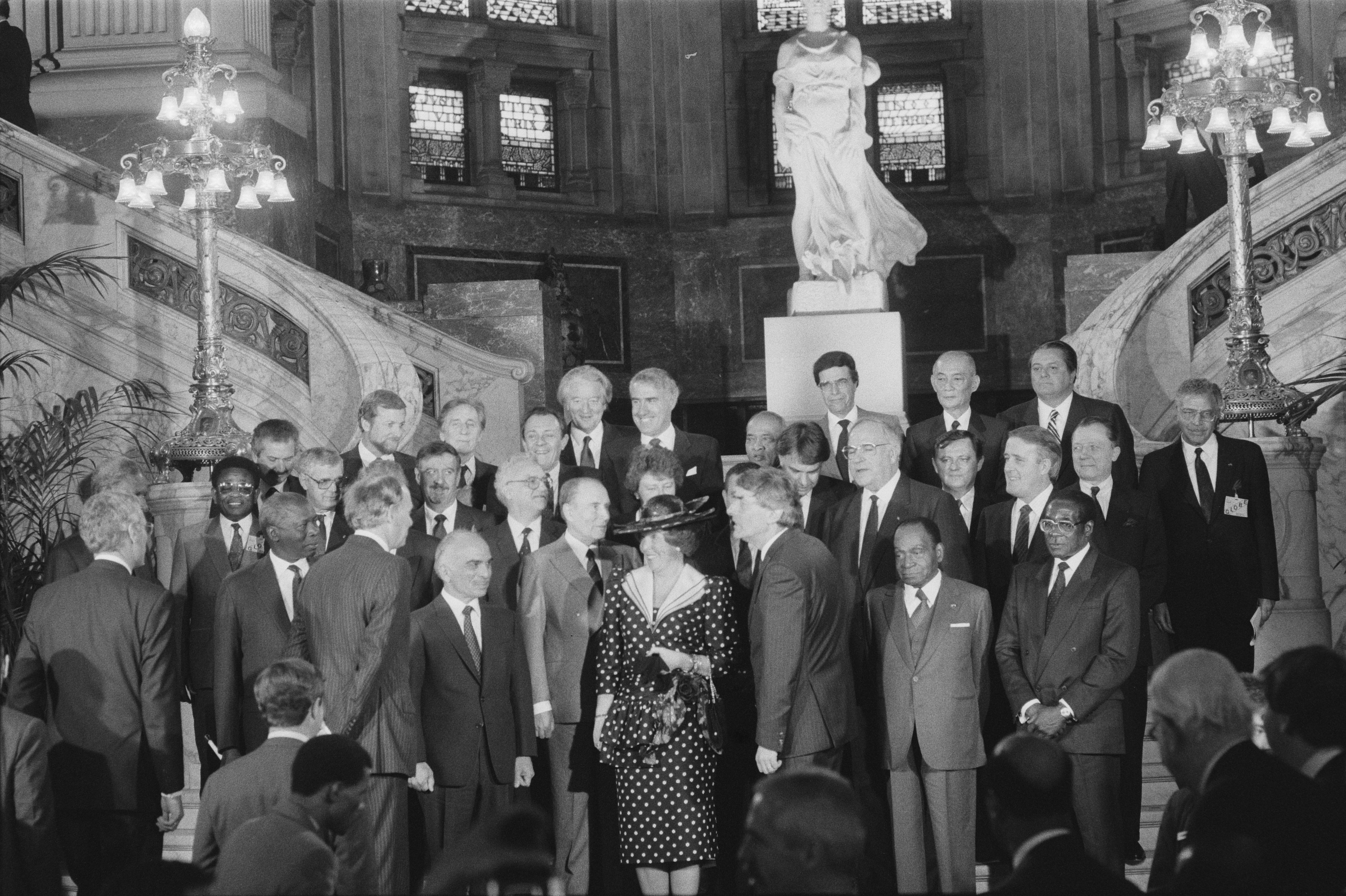
International environmental conference in the Peace Palace in The Hague, 11 March 1989

Inquiries that began at the request of foreign aid donors never amounted to anything substantial during Moi's presidency. Although it appears that the peaceful transition of power to Mwai Kibaki may have involved an understanding that Moi would not stand trial for offences committed during his presidency, foreign aid donors reiterated their requests, and Kibaki reopened the inquiry. As the inquiry progressed, Moi, his two sons; Philip and Gideon (now a Senator), and his daughter, June, as well as a host of high-ranking Kenyans, were implicated. In a testimony delivered in late July 2003, Treasury Permanent Secretary Joseph Magari recounted that in 1991 Moi ordered him to pay Ksh34.5 million ($460,000) to Goldenberg, contrary to the laws then in force.

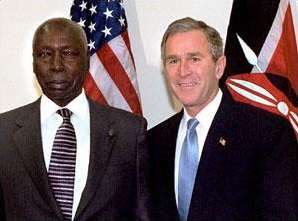
President Moi with U.S. President George W. Bush in New York in 2001

Wangari Maathai discussed Moi's actions during the 1980s and early 1990s, systematically attempting to dismantle the Greenbelt Movement after Maathai voiced displeasure at the government's attempts to build an office tower in Uhuru Park. According to Maathai, Moi's actions included removing the Greenbelt Movement from government office space and attempting to cut off funding from international donors by limiting funding through government sanctioned bodies. Maathai also discussed Moi's tactics during the beginning of the multiparty movement in the 1990s (see Forum for the Restoration of Democracy) whereby Moi announced the military would take over the government before the December 1992 elections. Maathai received communication during that time that an assassination list had been drawn up, and noted the mysterious deaths of Bishop Alexander Muge and Robert Ouko. The Release Political Prisoners party was also formed in the early 1990s to secure the release of political prisoners of the Moi regime and to protest state-sanctioned torture and random imprisonment. The police dispersed the protestors and many of the mothers of these political prisoners from Freedom Corner in Uhuru Park on March 3, 1992. After a year-long vigil and hunger strike by many of the mothers of these political prisoners in the Anglican All Saints Cathedral near Uhuru Park, the government released 51 prisoners en masse in early 1993.

In October 2006, Moi was found by the International Centre for Settlement of Investment Disputes to have taken a bribe from a Pakistani businessman, to award a monopoly of duty-free shops at the country's international airports in Mombasa and Nairobi. The businessman, Ali Nasir, claimed to have paid Moi US$2 million in cash to obtain government approval for the World Duty Free Limited investment in Kenya.

On 31 August 2007, WikiLeaks published a secret report that laid bare a web of shell companies, secret trusts and front men that his entourage had used to channel hundreds of millions of pounds into nearly 30 countries.

== Retirement ==
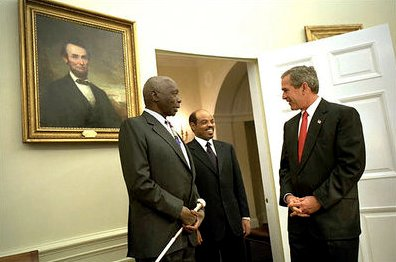
US President George W. Bush welcomes President Daniel arap Moi of Kenya and Prime Minister Meles Zenawi of Ethiopia to the Oval Office, 2002.

Moi was constitutionally barred from running in the 2002 presidential elections. Some of his supporters flirted with the idea of amending the constitution to allow him to run for a third term, but Moi preferred to retire, choosing Uhuru Kenyatta, the son of Kenya's first President, as his successor. However, Mwai Kibaki was elected president by a two to one majority over Kenyatta, which was confirmed on 29 December 2002. At that point Kibaki required the use of a wheelchair, having narrowly escaped death in a road accident on the campaign trail. Moi handed over power in a poorly organised ceremony that had one of the largest crowds ever seen in Nairobi in attendance. The crowd was openly hostile to Moi.

After leaving office in December 2002, Moi lived in retirement, largely shunned by the political establishment. Nevertheless, he still retained some popularity with the masses, and his presence never failed to gather a crowd. He spoke out against a proposal for a new constitution in 2005, which according to him, the document was contrary to the aspirations of the Kenyan people. After the proposal was defeated in a November 2005 constitutional referendum, President Kibaki called Moi to arrange for a meeting to discuss the way forward.

On 25 July 2007, Kibaki appointed Moi as special peace envoy to Sudan, referring to Moi's "vast experience and knowledge of African affairs" and "his stature as an elder statesman". In his capacity as peace envoy, Moi's primary task was to help secure peace in southern Sudan where an agreement, signed in early 2005, was being implemented. At the time, the Kenyan press speculated that Moi and Kibaki were planning an alliance ahead of the December 2007 election. On 28 August 2007, Moi announced his support for Kibaki's re-election and said that he would campaign for Kibaki. He sharply criticised the two opposition Orange Democratic Movement factions, arguing that they were tribal in nature.

Moi owned the Kiptagich Tea Factory, established in 1979, which has been involved in controversy. In 2009, the factory was under the threat of being closed down by the government during the Mau Forest evictions.

== Personal life ==
Moi was married to Lena Moi (née Helena Bomett) from 1950 until their separation in 1974, before his assumption of the presidency. Lena's parents, the Paul Bomett family, were pioneer Christians in Eldama Ravine. They respected Moi, the young, tall, handsome and well-mannered orphan boy.

It was at the Bometts that Moi sought shelter during school holidays, unable to return home, 160 kilometres away, like the older boys. He would also stay at the home of the Christian family of Isaiah Chesire, the father of Kanu's nominated MP Zipporah Kittony, and former Eldoret North MP Reuben Chesire.

In 1950, after leaving Kagumo Teacher's College, Moi, who had been dating Lena, married her in a church wedding officiated by Erik Barnett, the son of Albert Barnett (after whom Kabarnet Town is named) at the AIC mission in Eldama Ravine after he paid two heifers, one ox, and four sheep to the Bomett family. Moi's long-time friend, Francis Cherogony, was the best man. With the marriage, Lena abandoned her career as a teacher and immersed herself in bringing up her family, settling down with Moi at Tambach Government School, where his first two children, Jennifer and Jonathan Kipkemboi, were born in 1952 and 1953 respectively.

Daniel arap Moi had eight children: five sons and three daughters. Among the children are Gideon Moi, who had a political career of his own in Kenya and Jonathan Toroitich (a former rally driver, died 2019) and Philip Moi (a retired army officer). His older and only brother William Tuitoek died in 1995. He was a lifelong member of the Africa Inland Mission Church, following his enrollment at the church's school with fellow acquaintance Sammy C. and Philip M. in 1934.

Moi was the founder and patron of major schools in Kenya which include Moi Educational Centre, Kabarak High School, Kabarak University and Sunshine Secondary Schools, and Sacho Primary and Secondary, among others.

== Death ==
In October 2019, retired president Moi was hospitalized under critical condition at The Nairobi Hospital due to complications of pleural effusion. He was discharged in November 2019, only to be hospitalized again days later for knee surgery. He developed respiratory complications and underwent a tracheotomy. A month later, he suffered from gastrointestinal hemorrhage which led to multiple organ failure, and was placed on life-support.

Moi died at The Nairobi Hospital in the early morning of 4 February 2020, at the age of 95; however, during Moi's memorial service on 9 February 2020 at his Kabarnet Gardens home in Nairobi, his son Raymond, told congregants that he was 105 years old at the time of his death. Moi's body was lain at parliament building for public view for three days, from 8 February to 10 February 2020. A state funeral service was conducted at Nyayo Stadium on 11 February 2020, before the burial in his Kabarak home in Nakuru county. He was buried at his Kabarak home on 12 February 2020, complete with military honors which included a 19-gun salute followed by a missing man formation flyby. His grave is next to his former wife, Lena Bomett Moi, on the grounds of his home and farm in Kabarak.

== Legacy ==
=== Eponyms ===
- Moi Teaching and Referral Hospital
- Moi Air Base, Nairobi
- Moi International Airport, Mombasa
- Moi International Sports Centre, Kasarani, Nairobi
- Moi Stadium, Kisumu.
- Moi Stadium, Embu
- Moi University, Eldoret
- Roads and streets:
  - Moi Avenue (Mombasa)
  - Moi Avenue (Nairobi)
- A number of institutions of learning
  - Moi Girls High School, Eldoret among others

== See also ==
- Politics of Kenya
- Presidency of Daniel arap Moi

Political offices
Preceded by Joseph Murumbi	Vice-President of Kenya; 1967 – 1978	Succeeded by Mwai Kibaki
Preceded by Jomo Kenyatta	President of Kenya; 1978 – 2002	Succeeded by Mwai Kibaki
