= 1969 Kenyan general election =

1969 General Elections in Kenya

General elections were held in Kenya on 6 December 1969, the first since independence in 1963. The country had become a de facto one-party state after President Jomo Kenyatta had banned the Kenya People's Union on 30 October, with Kenyatta's Kenya African National Union being the sole party to participate in the election. Although the post of President of Kenya was due to be elected at the same time as the National Assembly, Kenyatta was the sole candidate and was automatically elected without a vote being held.

600 KANU candidates stood for the 158 seats in the newly unicameral National Assembly, with 77 incumbents defeated. Voter turnout was 44.6%. Following the election, a further 12 members were appointed by Kenyatta.

== Results ==
Party	Votes	%	Seats	+/–
Kenya African National Union	1,687,734	100.00	158	+75
Appointed members			12	New
Total	1,687,734	100.00	170	+41
Registered voters/turnout	3,784,276	–		
Source: Nohlen et al.
