= 1978 Kenyan presidential election =

- November 8, 1978
President before election
Daniel Arap Moi
Elected President
Daniel Arap Moi

Presidential elections were held in Kenya on 8 November 1978, the first not to be held concurrently with parliamentary elections. They followed the death in office of President Jomo Kenyatta in August 1978. The then-Vice President, Daniel arap Moi, who was sworn in as Acting President for a 90-day interim period beginning at the moment of Kenyatta's death, was the sole candidate and was automatically elected without a vote being held.

== Bibliography ==
- Assensoh, A. B. (1998). African Political Leadership: Jomo Kenyatta, Kwame Nkrumah, and Julius K. Nyerere. Malabar, Florida: Krieger Publishing Company. ISBN 978-0894649110.
- Cullen, Poppy (2016). "Funeral Planning: British Involvement in the Funeral of President Jomo Kenyatta" (PDF). The Journal of Imperial and Commonwealth History. 44 (3): 513–532. doi:10.1080/03086534.2016.1175737. S2CID 156552406.
- Kuria, Gibson Kamau (1991). "Confronting Dictatorship in Kenya". Journal of Democracy. 2 (4): 115–126. doi:10.1353/jod.1991.0060. S2CID 154003550.
