= Kenya African National Union =

Political party in Kenya

- Abbreviation: KANU
- Chairman: Gideon Moi
- Secretary-General: George Wainaina
- Spokesperson: Nick Salat
- Treasurer-General: Edward Kivuvani
- Founders: James Gichuru; Oginga Odinga; Tom Mboya
- Founded: 1960
- Merger of: KAU; KIM; NPCP (1961); KADU (1964)
- Headquarters: Chania Avenue, off Ring Road, Kilimani, Nairobi
- Newspaper: Uhuru
- Youth wing: KANU Youth Congress
- Women's wing: KANU Women Congress
- Disability wing: People With Disabilities (PWD) Caucus
- Ideology: Kenyan nationalism Conservatism; African nationalism Pan-Africanism; Historical: Anti-colonialism; Anti-communism; Capitalism; Nyayoism; Rural capitalism
- Political position: Centre-right to right-wing
- National affiliation: Azimio La Umoja
- Regional affiliation: Democrat Union of Africa
- International affiliation: International Democracy Union
- Colors: Black; Red; Green
- National Assembly: 5 / 349
- Senate: 0 / 67

Party flag

Website
- kanuparty.org

The Kenya African National Union (KANU) is a Kenyan political party that ruled for nearly 40 years after Kenya's independence from British colonial rule in 1963 until its electoral loss in 2002. It was known as Kenya African Union (KAU) from 1944 but due to pressure from the colonial government, KAU changed its name to Kenya African Study Union (KASU) mainly because all political parties were banned in 1939 following the start of the Second World War. In 1946 KASU rebranded itself into KAU following the resignation of Harry Thuku as president due to internal differences between the moderates who wanted peaceful negotiations and the militants who wanted to use force, the latter forming the Aanake a forty (The forty Group), which later became the Mau Mau. His post was then occupied by James Gichuru, who stepped down for Jomo Kenyatta in 1947 as president of KAU. The KAU was banned by the colonial government from 1952 to 1960. It was re-established by James Gichuru in 1960 and renamed KANU on 14 May 1960 after a merger with Tom Mboya's Kenya Independence Movement.

== History ==
=== Origins and Kenyatta ===
The Kenya African Union was a political organization formed in 1944 to articulate Kenyan grievances against the British colonial administration. The KAU attempted to be more inclusive than the Kikuyu Central Association by recruiting membership across the colony of Kenya.

From October 1952 to December 1959, Kenya was under a state of emergency arising from the armed Mau Mau rebellion against British colonial rule. What prompted the imposition of the state of emergency, by sir Evelyn Baring, was the assassination of one Chief Waruhiu who was an alleged British informer among many other reasons. KAU, the national political movement for Africans was banned in 1952 and its leaders including Jomo Kenyatta imprisoned in 1953. Kikuyu, Embu and Meru political involvement was restricted heavily in this period in response to the insurrection. During this period however, African participation in the political process increased rapidly throughout the colony of Kenya. Starting in 1954 the colonial government started to actively promote regional tribal based political parties led by leaders friendly to the colonial government. The colonial government governor then appointed these leaders of the tribal parties to the Legislative Council in 1956. Ronald Ngala was appointed to represent the Coast region, Daniel Moi was appointed to represent Rift Valley, Masinde Muliro was appointed to represent Western while Argwings Kodhek was appointed to represent Nairobi while Oginga Odinga became the Nyanza LegCo member. Jeremiah James Nyaga was appointed to represent Central Kenya. A ban on nationalist political parties however remained in force in Kenya until 1960.

The first direct elections for Africans to the Legislative Council took place in 1957. The majority of the 'moderate' and friendly leaders appointed to the Council by the colonial government were re-elected to the Council in 1957. The only exception was Tom Mboya, who ran as an independent and defeated Argwings Kodhek, who had been appointed by the colonial government to represent Nairobi in 1956.

The ban for national political movements was lifted in 1960. On 14 May 1960, KAU (having been resurrected by James Gichuru) merged with Tom Mboya's Kenya Independence Movement and the Nairobi People's Convention Party to form the Kenya African National Union (KANU) with Tom Mboya as its first secretary general and James Gichuru as KANU chairman. Oginga Odinga was the KANU first vice chairman.

The Kenya African Democratic Union (KADU) was founded in 1960, to challenge KANU. KADU's aim was to defend the interests of the tribes so-called KAMATUSA (an acronym for Kalenjin, Maasai, Turkana and Samburu) as well as the European settler community, against the dominance of the larger Luo and Kĩkũyũ tribes that comprised the majority of KANU's membership (Kenyatta himself being a Kikuyu). KANU was in favour of immediate total independence, a new independence constitution and universal suffrage while KADU was supporting the continuation of the colonial political system established by the Lyttelton Constitution of 1954 with federalism (Majimbo) as KADU's key tenets. Despite the numerical advantage lying with the numerically stronger KANU, a form of Federalism involving Kenya's 8 provinces was adopted in Kenya's independence as a result of British colonial government supporting KADU's plan. After independence KANU nonetheless decided to remove all provisions of a federal nature from the constitution.

Kenyatta was released in 1961, and the KANU contested the 1961 Kenyan general election (winning a plurality of the seats and 67.50% of the popular vote). Following the implementation of a new colonial constitution (the key feature of which were a bicameral legislature consisting of a 117-member House of Representatives and a 41-member Senate, and the elimination of reserved seats for ethnic minorities), the KANU contested and won a majority of the votes and seats in the 1963 Kenyan general election. Kenya became independent on 12 December 1963. Jomo Kenyatta, head of the KANU, became Kenya's first prime minister.

=== Independence ===
KADU dissolved itself voluntarily in 1964 and joined KANU after a strong lobbying by Tom Mboya. In this year, Kenya became a republic within the Commonwealth, with Kenyatta as its first president.

A small but significant leftist opposition party, the Kenya People's Union (KPU), was formed in 1966, led by Jaramogi Oginga Odinga, a former vice president and Luo elder. The KPU was banned and its leader detained after political unrest related to Kenyatta's visit to Nyanza Province that resulted in the Kisumu massacre. No new opposition parties were formed after 1969, and KANU became the sole political party. At Kenyatta's death in August 1978, Vice President Daniel arap Moi, a former KADU member became interim President. On 14 October, Moi became president formally after he was elected head of KANU and designated its sole nominee.

=== One-party state and return to democracy ===
In June 1982, the National Assembly amended the constitution, making Kenya officially a one-party state. Parliamentary elections were held in September 1983. The 1988 elections reinforced the one-party system. However, in December 1991, parliament repealed the one-party section of the constitution. By early 1992, several new parties had formed, and multiparty elections were held in December 1992.

President Moi was reelected for another 5-year term. Opposition parties won about 45% of the parliamentary seats, but President Moi's KANU Party obtained the majority of seats. Parliamentary reforms in November 1997 enlarged the democratic space in Kenya, including the expansion of political parties from 11 to 26. President Moi won re-election as president in the December 1997 elections, and his KANU Party narrowly retained its parliamentary majority, with 109 out of 212 seats.

=== 2002 elections ===
At the 2002 legislative national elections, the party won an overall 29.0% of the popular vote and 64 out of 212 elected seats. In the presidential elections of the same day, the party's candidate Uhuru Kenyatta won 31.3% of the vote, and was thereby defeated by Mwai Kibaki from the National Rainbow Coalition (NARC) party with 62.2%. On 29 December 2002, the Kenyan electoral commission confirmed that the former opposition NARC party had achieved a landslide victory over the ruling KANU party, thus bringing to an end 40 years of single party rule and 24 years of rule by Daniel arap Moi.

=== Post-2002 ===
The political parties ODM-Kenya and Orange Democratic Movement both came into existence out of this movement. The smaller faction, headed by Nicholas Biwott and supported by Daniel arap Moi was opposed to the direction Kenyatta was taking the party. The two factions briefly patched up their differences under the mediation of former party leader Daniel Moi; the result being KANU did not field a presidential candidate in Kenya's disputed general election of 2007, backing instead the incumbent Mwai Kibaki.

=== Uhuru Kenyatta and Moi in 2007 ===
In September 2007, Kenyatta announced that he would not run for the presidency and would support Kibaki's re-election, sinking any hopes that KANU would back the Orange Democratic Movement. William Ruto however remained in ODM applying for the presidential candidacy. Of particular interest is that Uhuru's statement came soon after Moi's declaration that he would back current president Kibaki's re-election bid. KANU is part of the Party of National Unity (PNU), a coalition party behind Kibaki. However, unlike other PNU member parties, only KANU had clearance to field its own parliamentary and civic candidates. Since the coming into force of the Political Parties act of 2011, differences have once again emerged over the future of the party with a faction led by Gideon Moi accusing Uhuru Kenyatta of neglecting the party. Kenyatta, and his supporters, eventually quit the party altogether and in December 2012, KANU entered a four party coalition, including the National Vision Party, United Democratic Movement and New Ford Kenya, to field a single presidential candidate at the 2013 general elections.

== Ideology ==
Upon its inception in 1960, KANU included politicians of various ideologies, including African socialism, which was highlighted in the immediate post-independence period. However, with the adoption of Sessional Paper No. 10 of 1965 in Kenya's parliament and the resignation of left-leaning politicians allied to Oginga Odinga, it pursued a mixed market economic policy, with state intervention in the form of parastatals. It steered Kenya to side with the West during the Cold War, with both Jomo Kenyatta and Daniel Moi using apparent links to the Soviet Union as pretexts to crush political dissent.

== Structure ==
KANU's leadership structure consists of a national chairman, a secretary general, and several national vice chairmen. All these officials are elected at a national delegates conference. (The last full election was in 2005 and it saw Uhuru Kenyatta, who has since quit the party, confirmed as party chairman.)

Delegates who participate at the national elections are selected through the party's constituency level branches.

== Past chairmen ==
- 1960 to 1962 – James Gichuru (acting for Kenyatta)
- 1961 to 1978 – Jomo Kenyatta
- 1978 to 2005 – Daniel arap Moi
- 2005 to 2012 – Uhuru Kenyatta
- 2013 to present – Gideon Moi

== Electoral history ==
=== Presidential elections ===
Election	Party candidate	Votes	%	Result
1969	Jomo Kenyatta	Ran unopposed		Elected ✓
1974	Jomo Kenyatta	Ran unopposed		Elected ✓
1978	Daniel Arap Moi	Ran unopposed		Elected ✓
1979	Daniel Arap Moi	Ran unopposed		Elected ✓
1983	Daniel Arap Moi	Ran unopposed		Elected ✓
1988	Daniel Arap Moi	Ran unopposed		Elected ✓
1992	Daniel Arap Moi	1,927,645	36.6%	Elected ✓
1997	Daniel Arap Moi	2,500,865	40.40%	Elected ✓
2002	Uhuru Kenyatta	1,835,890	30.2%	Lost ✗

=== National Assembly elections ===
Election	Party leader	Votes		%	Seats	+/–	Position
1961	Jomo Kenyatta	590,661		67.5%	19 / 65	▲19	▲1st
1963	Jomo Kenyatta	988,311		53.60%	83 / 129	▲64	1st
1969	Jomo Kenyatta	1,687,734		100%	158 / 170	▲75	1st
1974	Jomo Kenyatta	2,627,308		100%	158 / 170	Steady	1st
1979	Daniel Arap Moi	3,733,537		100%	158 / 170	Steady	1st
1983	Daniel Arap Moi	3,331,047		100%	158 / 170	Steady	1st
1988	Daniel Arap Moi	2,231,229		100%	188 / 200	▲30	1st
1992	Daniel Arap Moi	1,327,691		24.5%	100 / 188	▼88	1st
1997	Daniel Arap Moi				107 / 210	▲7	1st
2002	Daniel Arap Moi	1,361,828		29.0%	64 / 210	▼43	▼2nd
2007	Uhuru Kenyatta	613,864		6.36%	15 / 210	▼49	▼4th
2013	Gideon Moi	Constituency	286,393	2.35%	6 / 349	▼9	▼7th
2013	Gideon Moi	County	140,635	1.16%	6 / 349	▼9	▼7th
2017	Gideon Moi	Constituency	366,808	2.45%	10 / 348	▲4	▲6th
2017	Gideon Moi	County	357,146	2.36%	10 / 348	▲4	▲6th
2022	Gideon Moi				5 / 348	▼5	▼9th

=== Senate elections ===
Election	Party leader	Votes	%	Seats	+/–	Position
1963	Jomo Kenyatta	1,028,906	59.18%	18 / 38	▲18	▲1st
Abolished in 1966 re-established in 2013
2013	Gideon Moi	441,645	3.64%	3 / 67	▲3	▲7th
2017	Gideon Moi			3 / 67	Steady	▲5th
