= List of members of the National Assembly of Kenya, 2013–2017 =

National Assembly elections were held in Kenya as part of the general election on 4 March 2013. Under the new constitution, which was passed in a 2010 referendum, the 2013 elections were the first run by the Independent Electoral and Boundaries Commission. The constitution provided for 290 National Assembly seats directly elected by geographic constituencies, 47 seats for county woman representatives and 12 nominated representatives. A speaker was chosen to serve as an ex officio officer.

== Results summary ==
Coalition	Party	Constituency Representatives	Women County Representatives	Nominated Representatives	Total
Jubilee Alliance	The National Alliance	72	14	3	89
Jubilee Alliance	United Republican Party	62	10	3	75
Jubilee Alliance	National Rainbow Coalition	3			
Jubilee Alliance	Total	137	24	6	167
CORD	Orange Democratic Movement	78	15	3	96
CORD	Wiper Democratic Movement – Kenya	19	6	1	26
CORD	FORD-Kenya	9	–	1	10
CORD	Federal Party of Kenya	3	–	–	3
CORD	Chama Cha Uzalendo	2			
CORD	KADU-Asili	1	–	–	1
CORD	Muungano Party	1	–	–	1
CORD	Peoples Democratic Party	1	–	–	1
CORD	The Independent Party	1	–	–	1
CORD	Total	115	21	5	141
Amani	United Democratic Forum Party	11	–	1	12
Amani	Kenya African National Union	6	–	–	6
Amani	New Ford Kenya	4	2	–	6
Amani	Total	21	2	1	24
Eagle	Kenya National Congress	2	–	–	2
Eagle	Total	2	0	0	2
Unaffiliated	Alliance Party of Kenya	5	–	–	5
Unaffiliated	FORD-People	4	–	–	4
Unaffiliated	Independent	4	–	–	4
Unaffiliated	Maendeleo Democratic Party	1	–	–	1
Unaffiliated	NARC-Kenya	1	–	–	1
Unaffiliated	Total	15	0	0	15
Total		290	47	12	349

== Members ==
=== Constituency members (290) ===
County	Number	Constituency	Representative-elect	Party
Mombasa	1	Changamwe	Omar Mwinyi	ODM
Mombasa	2	Jomvu	Badi Twalib	WDM-K
Mombasa	3	Kisauni	Rashid Bezimba	ODM
Mombasa	4	Nyali	Hezron Awiti	WDM-K
Mombasa	5	Likoni	Masoud Mwahima	ODM
Mombasa	6	Mvita	Abdulswamad Shariff Nassir	ODM
Kwale	7	Msambweni	Suleiman Dori Ramadhani	ODM
Kwale	8	Lunga Lunga	Khatib Abdallah Mwashetani	FORD-KENYA
Kwale	9	Matuga	Hassan Mohamed Mwanyoha	ODM
Kwale	10	Kinango	Gonzi Rai	TNA
Kilifi	11	Kilifi North	Gideon Mung'aro	ODM
Kilifi	12	Kilifi South	Salid Idd Mustafa	ODM
Kilifi	13	Kaloleni	Mwinga Gunga Chea	KADU-ASIL
Kilifi	14	Rabai	William Kamoti	ODM
Kilifi	15	Ganze	Peter Safari Shehe	FPK
Kilifi	16	Malindi	Dan Kazungu Muzee	ODM
Kilifi	17	Magarini	Harrison Kombe	URP
Tana River	18	Garsen	Ibrahim Ahmed Sane	URP
Tana River	19	Galole	Hassan Dukicha	UDF
Tana River	20	Bura	Ali Wario	TNA
Lamu	21	Lamu East	Ali Sharif Athman	UDF
Lamu	22	Lamu West	Julius Kariuki Ndegwa	KNC
Taita-Taveta	23	Taveta	Naomi Shaban	TNA
Taita-Taveta	24	Wundanyi	Thomas Mwadeghu	ODM
Taita-Taveta	25	Mwatate	Andrew Mwadime	ODM
Taita-Taveta	26	Voi	Jones Mlolwa	ODM
Garissa	27	Dujis	Aden Bare Duale	URP
Garissa	28	Balambala	Abdikadir Omar Aden	ODM
Garissa	29	Lagdera	Mohamed Muktar Shidiye	TNA
Garissa	30	Dadaab	Mohamed Dahir Duale	ODM
Garissa	31	Fafi	Elias Bare Shill	URP
Garissa	32	Ijara	Ahmed Abass	ODM
Wajir	33	Wajir North	Ibrahim Abdi Saney	ODM
Wajir	34	Wajir East	Abass Sheikh Mohamed	URP
Wajir	35	Tarbaj	Mohamed Elmi	ODM
Wajir	36	Wajir West	Abdikadir Ore Ahmed	ODM
Wajir	37	Eldas	Adan Keynan Wehliye	ODM
Wajir	38	Wajir South	Gedi Yarrow	ODM
Mandera	39	Mandera West	Mohamed Maalim Mohamud	URP
Mandera	40	Banissa	Mohamed Abdi Haji Mohamed	URP
Mandera	41	Mandera North	Adan Mohamed Nooru	URP
Mandera	42	Mandera South	Mohamed Huka Adan	URP
Mandera	43	Mandera East	Abdulaziz Ali Farah	URP
Mandera	44	Lafey	Shaaban Ali Issack	URP
Marsabit	45	Moyale	Roba Sharu Duba	UDF
Marsabit	46	North Horr	Francis Chachu Ganya	ODM
Marsabit	47	Saku	Ali Rasso Dido	URP
Marsabit	48	Laisamis	Joseph Lekuton	ODM
Isiolo	49	Isiolo North	Joseph Samal Lomwa	URP
Isiolo	50	Isiolo South	Abdullahi Jaldesa Banticha	URP
Meru	51	Igembe South	Mithika Linturi	TNA
Meru	52	Igembe Central	Kubai Kiringo	ODM
Meru	53	Igembe North	Joseph Meruaki Muthari	TNA
Meru	54	Tigania West	David Karithi	TNA
Meru	55	Tigania East	Mpuru Aburi	ODM
Meru	56	North Imenti	Abdul Rahim Dawood	APK
Meru	57	Buuri	Kinoti Gatobu	Independent
Meru	58	Central Imenti	Gideon Mwiti	APK
Meru	59	South Imenti	Kathuri Murungi	TNA
Tharaka Nithi	60	Maara	Kareke Mbiuki	TNA
Tharaka Nithi	61	Chuka/Igambang'ombe	Muthomi Njuki	APK
Tharaka Nithi	62	Tharaka	Mburi Muiru	URP
Embu	63	Manyatta	John Muchiri	TNA
Embu	64	Runyenjes	Cecily Mbarire	TNA
Embu	65	Mbeere South	Mutava Musyimi	TNA
Embu	66	Mbeere North	Muriuki Njagagua	APK
Kitui	67	Mwingi North	John Munure	WDM-K
Kitui	68	Mwingi West	Bernard Kitungi	WDM-K
Kitui	69	Mwingi Central	Joe Mutambu	WDM-K
Kitui	70	Kitui West	Francis Nyenze	WDM-K
Kitui	71	Kitui Rural	Charles Mutisya Nyamai	WDM-K
Kitui	72	Kitui Central	Makali Mulu	WDM-K
Kitui	73	Kitui East	Marcus Mutua Muluvi	WDM-K
Kitui	74	Kitui South	Rachael Nyamai	NARC
Machakos	75	Masinga	Itwiku Mbai	FORD-P
Machakos	76	Yatta	Francis Mwangangi	MP
Machakos	77	Kangundo	Maweu Katatha	TIP
Machakos	78	Matungulu	Stephen Mule	WDM-K
Machakos	79	Kathiani	Robert Mbui	WDM-K
Machakos	80	Mavoko	Patrick Makau	WDM-K
Machakos	81	Machakos Town	Victor Munyaka	CCU
Machakos	82	Mwala	Vincent Musyoka	CCU
Makueni	83	Mbooni	Michael Kisio Munyao	WDM-K
Makueni	84	Kilome	Regina Nthambi Muia	WDM-K
Makueni	85	Kaiti	Richard Makenga	WDM-K
Makueni	86	Makueni	Daniel Maanzo	WDM-K
Makueni	87	Kibwezi West	Patrick Mweu Musimba	Independent
Makueni	88	Kibwezi East	Jessica Mbalu	WDM-K
Nyandarua	89	Kinangop	Stephen Kinyanjui	TNA
Nyandarua	90	Kipipiri	Samuel Gichigi	APK
Nyandarua	91	Ol Kalou	David Kiaraho	TNA
Nyandarua	92	Ol Jorok	JM Waiganjo	TNA
Nyandarua	93	Ndaragwa	Waweru Nderitu	TNA
Nyeri	94	Tetu	Ndung’u Gethenji	TNA
Nyeri	95	Kieni	James Mathenge Kanini Kega	TNA
Nyeri	96	Mathira	Peter Weru	NARC
Nyeri	97	Othaya	Mary Wambui	TNA
Nyeri	98	Mukurweini	Kabando wa Kabando	TNA
Nyeri	99	Nyeri Town	Esther Murugi	TNA
Kirinyaga	100	Mwea	Peter Njuguna Gitau	TNA
Kirinyaga	101	Gichugu	Ejidious Barua	TNA
Kirinyaga	102	Ndia	Stephen Muriuki Ngari	TNA
Kirinyaga	103	Kirinyaga Central	Joseph Gitari	TNA
Murang'a	104	Kangema	Tirus Ngahu	TNA
Murang'a	105	Mathioya	Clement Wambugu	TNA
Murang'a	106	Kiharu	Irungu Kangata	TNA
Murang'a	107	Kigumo	Jamleck Irungu Kamau	TNA
Murang'a	108	Maragwa	Peter Kamande	TNA
Murang'a	109	Kandara	Alice Muthoni	TNA
Murang'a	110	Gatanga	Humphrey Njuguna	NARC
Kiambu	111	Gatundu South	Jossy Ngugi	TNA
Kiambu	112	Gatundu North	Francis Kigo Njenga	TNA
Kiambu	113	Juja	Francis Waititu	TNA
Kiambu	114	Thika Town	Alice Wambui	TNA
Kiambu	115	Ruiru	Esther Gathogo	TNA
Kiambu	116	Githunguri	Njoroge Baiya	TNA
Kiambu	117	Kiambu	Jude Njomo	TNA
Kiambu	118	Kiambaa	Paul Koinange	TNA
Kiambu	119	Kabete	George Muchai	TNA
Kiambu	120	Kikuyu	Kimani Ichung'wah	TNA
Kiambu	121	Limuru	John Kiragu	TNA
Kiambu	122	Lari	Mburu Kahangara	TNA
Turkana	123	Turkana North	Christopher Doye Nakuleu	URP
Turkana	124	Turkana West	Daniel Epuyo Nanok	URP
Turkana	125	Turkana Central	John Lodepe Nakara	URP
Turkana	126	Loima	Protus Ewesit Akujah	ODM
Turkana	127	Turkana South	James Lomenen Ekomwa	TNA
Turkana	128	Turkana East	Nicholas Ngikor Nixon	FORD-KENYA
West Pokot	129	Kapenguria	Samuel Moroto Chumel	KANU
West Pokot	130	Sigor	Philip Lotiolo Ruto Rotino	URP
West Pokot	131	Kacheliba	Mark Lomunokol	URP
West Pokot	132	Pokot South	David Pkosing Losiakou	URP
Samburu	133	Samburu West	Jonathan Lelelit	URP
Samburu	134	Samburu North	Musa Lentoimanga	TNA
Samburu	135	Samburu East	Raphael Lentimalo	TNA
Trans Nzoia	136	Kwanza	Ferdinand Wanyonyi	FORD-KENYA
Trans Nzoia	137	Endebess	Robert Pukose	URP
Trans Nzoia	138	Saboti	David Wafula Lazaro	NFK
Trans Nzoia	139	Kiminini	Chris Wamalwa	FORD-KENYA
Trans Nzoia	140	Cherangany	Wesley Korir	Independent
Uasin Gishu	141	Soy	Edwin Barchilei	URP
Uasin Gishu	142	Turbo	Elisha Busienei	URP
Uasin Gishu	143	Moiben	Sila Tiren	URP
Uasin Gishu	144	Ainabkoi	Samuel Chepkonga	URP
Uasin Gishu	145	Kapseret	Oscar Sudi	URP
Uasin Gishu	146	Kesses	James Bett	URP
Elgeyo Marakwet	147	Marakwet East	David Kangogo Bowen	URP
Elgeyo Marakwet	148	Marakwet West	William Kipkemoi Kisang	URP
Elgeyo Marakwet	149	Keiyo North	James Kipkosgei Murgor	URP
Elgeyo Marakwet	150	Keiyo South	Jackson Kiplagat Kiptanui	URP
Nandi	151	Tinderet	Julius Kibiwott Melly	URP
Nandi	152	Aldai	Cornelly Serem	URP
Nandi	153	Nandi Hills	Alfred Kiptoo Keter	URP
Nandi	154	Chesumei	Elijah Lagat	URP
Nandi	155	Emgwen	Alexander Kosgey	URP
Nandi	156	Mosop	Kirwa Stephen Bitok	URP
Baringo	157	Tiaty	Asman Kamama	URP
Baringo	158	Baringo North	William Cheptumo	URP
Baringo	159	Baringo Central	Sammy Silas Komen Mwaita	URP
Baringo	160	Baringo South	Grace Jelagat Kipchoim	URP
Baringo	161	Mogotio	Hellen Sambili	KANU
Baringo	162	Eldama Ravine	Moses Lessonet	URP
Laikipia	163	Laikipia West	Stephen Wachira Karani	TNA
Laikipia	164	Laikipia East	Anthony Kimaru	TNA
Laikipia	165	Laikipia North	Mathew Lekidime Lempurkel	ODM
Nakuru	166	Molo	Jacob Macharia	TNA
Nakuru	167	Njoro	Joseph Kiuna	TNA
Nakuru	168	Naivasha	John Karanja Kihagi	TNA
Nakuru	169	Gilgil	Samuel Nderitu	TNA
Nakuru	170	Kuresoi South	Zakayo Cheruiyot	URP
Nakuru	171	Kuresoi North	Moses Kipkemboi Cheboi	KANU
Nakuru	172	Subukia	Nelson Gaichuhie	TNA
Nakuru	173	Rongai	Raymond Moi	KANU
Nakuru	174	Bahati	Kimani Ngunjiri	TNA
Nakuru	175	Nakuru Town West	Samuel Arama	ODM
Nakuru	176	Nakuru Town East	David Gikaria	TNA
Narok	177	Kilgoris	Gideon Sitelu Konchella	URP
Narok	178	Emurua Dikirr	Johana Ng’eno	KNC
Narok	179	Narok North	Moitalel ole Kenta	TNA
Narok	180	Narok East	Lemanken Aramat	URP
Narok	181	Narok South	Korei ole Lemein	URP
Narok	182	Narok West	Patrick Keturet Ole Ntutu	URP
Kajiado	183	Kajiado North	Joseph Manje	TNA
Kajiado	184	Kajiado Central	Joseph Ole Nkaissery	ODM
Kajiado	185	Kajiado East	Peris Tobiko	TNA
Kajiado	186	Kajiado West	Moses ole Sakuda	TNA
Kajiado	187	Kajiado South	Katoo Metito	TNA
Kericho	188	Kipkelion East	Kirui Joseph Limo	URP
Kericho	189	Kipkelion West	Jackson Kipkorir Rop	URP
Kericho	190	Ainamoi	Benjamin Kipkirui Langat	URP
Kericho	191	Bureti	Leonard Kipkosgei Sang	URP
Kericho	192	Belgut	Eric Keter	KANU
Kericho	193	Sigowet/Soin	Justice Kipsang Kemei	URP
Bomet	194	Sotik	Joyce Cherono Abonyo Laboso	URP
Bomet	195	Chepalungu	Paul Kipchirchir Bii	URP
Bomet	196	Bomet East	Benard Bett	URP
Bomet	197	Bomet Central	Ronald Kiprotich Tonui	URP
Bomet	198	Konoin	Sammy Cheruiyot Koech	URP
Kakamega	199	Lugari	Ayub Savula Angatia	UDF
Kakamega	200	Likuyani	Enoch Wamalwa Kibunguchy	ODM
Kakamega	201	Malava	Injendi Malulu	MDP
Kakamega	202	Lurambi	Raphael Milikau Otaalo	ODM
Kakamega	203	Navakholo	Emmanuel Wangwe	UDF
Kakamega	204	Mumias West	Johnson Manya Naicca	ODM
Kakamega	205	Mumias East	Benjamin Washiali	UDF
Kakamega	206	Matungu	David Were	NFK
Kakamega	207	Butere	Andrew Toboso Anyanga	ODM
Kakamega	208	Khwisero	Benjamin A. Andayi	ODM
Kakamega	209	Shinyalu	Lisamula Silverse Anami	ODM
Kakamega	210	Ikolomani	Benard Masaka Shinali	UDF
Vihiga	211	Vihiga	Yusuf Kifuma Chanzu	UDF
Vihiga	212	Sabatia	Alfred Agoi Masadia	UDF
Vihiga	213	Hamisi	Charles Gumini Gimose	FPK
Vihiga	214	Luanda	Christopher Omulele	ODM
Vihiga	215	Emuhaya	Wilbur Otichilo	ODM
Bungoma	216	Mt. Elgon	John Serut	Independent
Bungoma	217	Sirisia	John Waluke Koyi	ODM
Bungoma	218	Kabuchai	James Lusweti Mukwe	FORD-KENYA
Bungoma	219	Bumula	Bonface Okhiya Otsiula	NFK
Bungoma	220	Kanduyi	Wafula Wamunyinyi	FORD-KENYA
Bungoma	221	Webuye East	Bernard Alfred Wekesa Sambu	UDF
Bungoma	222	Webuye West	Daniel Wanyama Sitati	NFK
Bungoma	223	Kimilili	Suleiman Murunga Kasuti	FORD-KENYA
Bungoma	224	Tongaren	Simiyu Eseli	FORD-KENYA
Busia	225	Teso North	Arthur Papa Odera	URP
Busia	226	Teso South	Mary Emaase Otuch	URP
Busia	227	Nambale	Sakwa John Bunyasi	UDF
Busia	228	Matayos	Geoffrey Makokha Odanga	ODM
Busia	229	Butula	Michael Aringo Onyura	FPK
Busia	230	Funyula	Paul Otuoma	ODM
Busia	231	Budalangi	Ababu Namwamba	ODM
Siaya	232	Ugenya	David Ouma Ochieng'	ODM
Siaya	233	Ugunja	James Opiyo Wandayi	ODM
Siaya	234	Alego Usonga	George Washington Mallan Omondi	WDM-K
Siaya	235	Gem	Washington Jakoyo Midiwo	ODM
Siaya	236	Bondo	Gideon Ochanda Ogolla	ODM
Siaya	237	Rarieda	Nicolas O. Gumbo	ODM
Kisumu	238	Kisumu East	Shakeel Shabbir	ODM
Kisumu	239	Kisumu West	Olago Aluoch	FORD-KENYA
Kisumu	240	Kisumu Central	Ken Obura	ODM
Kisumu	241	Seme	James Nyikal	ODM
Kisumu	242	Nyando	Fred Outa	ODM
Kisumu	243	Muhoroni	Onyango Oyoo	PDP
Kisumu	244	Nyakach	Aduma Owuor	ODM
Homa Bay	245	Kasipul	Joseph O. Magwanga	ODM
Homa Bay	246	Kabondo Kasipul	Silvance Osele Onyango	ODM
Homa Bay	247	Karachuonyo	James Gordon Kwanya Rege	ODM
Homa Bay	248	Rangwe	George Oner Ogalo	ODM
Homa Bay	249	Homa Bay Town	George Peter Opondo Kaluma	ODM
Homa Bay	250	Ndhiwa	Aghostinho Neto Oyugi	ODM
Homa Bay	251	Mbita	Millie Odhiambo	ODM
Homa Bay	252	Suba	Mbadi John Ng'ongo	ODM
Migori	253	Rongo	Dalmas Otieno	ODM
Migori	254	Awendo	Jared Odhiambo Opiyo	FORD-P
Migori	255	Suna East	Junet Sheikh Nuh	ODM
Migori	256	Suna West	Joseph Obiero Ndiege	ODM
Migori	257	Uriri	John Owuor Onyango Kobado	ODM
Migori	258	Nyatike	Peter Edick Omondi Anyanga	ODM
Migori	259	Kuria West	Mathias Robi	URP
Migori	260	Kuria East	Shadrack Manga	KANU
Kisii	261	Bonchari	John Zebedeo Opore	FORD-P
Kisii	262	South Mugirango	Manson Nyamweya	ODM
Kisii	263	Bomachoge Borabu	Joel Onyancha	TNA
Kisii	264	Bobasi	Stephen Manoti	FORD-P
Kisii	265	Bomachoge Chache	Simon Ogari	ODM
Kisii	266	Nyaribari Masaba	Elijah Moindi	NARC-Kenya
Kisii	267	Nyaribari Chache	Chris Bichage	ODM
Kisii	268	Kitutu Chache North	Jimmy Angwenyi	TNA
Kisii	269	Kitutu Chache South	Richard Onyonka	ODM
Nyamira	270	Kitutu Masaba	Timothy Bosire	ODM
Nyamira	271	West Mugirango	James Gesami	ODM
Nyamira	272	North Mugirango	Charles Geni	ODM
Nyamira	273	Borabu	Ben Momanyi	WDM-K
Nairobi	274	Westlands	Timothy Wanyonyi Wetangula	ODM
Nairobi	275	Dagoretti North	Paul Simba Arati	ODM
Nairobi	276	Dagoretti South	Dennis Kariuki Waweru	TNA
Nairobi	277	Langata	Joash Olum	ODM
Nairobi	278	Kibra	Kenneth Okoth	ODM
Nairobi	279	Roysambu	Waihenya Ndirangu	TNA
Nairobi	280	Kasarani	John Njoroge Chege	TNA
Nairobi	281	Ruaraka	Tom Kajwang	ODM
Nairobi	282	Embakasi South	Irshadali Sumra	ODM
Nairobi	283	Embakasi North	James Mwangi Gakuya	TNA
Nairobi	284	Embakasi Central	John Ndirangu	TNA
Nairobi	285	Embakasi East	John Omondi	ODM
Nairobi	286	Embakasi West	George Theuri	TNA
Nairobi	287	Makadara	Benson Mutura	TNA
Nairobi	288	Kamukunji	Yusuf Hassan Abdi	TNA
Nairobi	289	Starehe	Maina Kamanda	TNA
Nairobi	290	Mathare	George Mike Wanjohi	TNA

=== Women County Representatives (47) ===
County No	Name	Representative-elect	Party
1	Mombasa	Mishi Juma	ODM
2	Kwale	Zainab Kalekye	ODM
3	Kilifi	Aisha Jumwa	ODM
4	Tana-River	Halima Ware	WDM-K
5	Lamu	Shakila Abdalla	WDM-K
6	Taita-Taveta	Joyce Wanjala Lay	ODM
7	Garissa	Shukran Hussein Gure	WDM-K
8	Wajir	Fatuma Ibrahim Ali	ODM
9	Mandera	Fathia Mahbuub	URP
10	Marsabit	Nasra Ibrahim Ibren	ODM
11	Isiolo	Tiyah Galgalo	TNA
12	Meru	Florence Kajuju	TNA
13	Tharaka	Beatrice Nkatha	TNA
14	Embu	Rose Rwamba Mitaru	TNA
15	Kitui	Nyiva Mwendwa	WDM-K
16	Machakos	Susan Musyoka	WDM-K
17	Makueni	Rose Mumo Museo	WDM-K
18	Nyandarua	Wanjiku Muhia	TNA
19	Nyeri	Priscilla Nyokabi	TNA
20	Kirinyaga	Winnie Karimi	TNA
21	Murang'a	Wanjiru Chege	TNA
22	Kiambu	Annah Gatheca	TNA
23	Turkana	Joyce Akai Emanikor	URP
24	West-Pokot	Regina Nyeris Changorok	URP
25	Samburu	Maison Leshoomo	TNA
26	Trans-Nzoia	Janet Nangabo	NFK
27	Uasin-Gishu	Eusila Ngeny	URP
28	Elgeyo-Marakwet	Susan Chebet	URP
29	Nandi	Zipporah Kering	URP
30	Baringo	Grace Kobilo Kiptui	URP
31	Laikipia	Jane Machira Appolos	TNA
32	Nakuru	Mary Mbugua	TNA
33	Narok	Soipan Tuya	URP
34	Kajiado	Mary Yiane Seneta	TNA
35	Kericho	Hellen Chelangat Chepkwony	URP
36	Bomet	Cecilia Ngetich	URP
37	Kakamega	Rachel Amolo	ODM
38	Vihiga	Dorcas Kedogo	ODM
39	Bungoma	Reginalda Wanyonyi	NFK
40	Busia	Florence Mwikali	ODM
41	Siaya	Christine Ombaka	ODM
42	Kisumu	Rose Nyamunga	ODM
43	Homabay	Gladys Atieno Nyasuna	ODM
44	Migori	Dennitah Ghati	ODM
45	Kisii	Mary Keraa-Otara	ODM
46	Nyamira	Alice Chae	ODM
47	Nairobi	Rachel Shebesh	TNA

=== Nominated Representatives (12) ===
No	Nominated Member	Party
1	Patrick Wangamati	FORD-KENYA
2	Oburu Odinga	ODM
3	Mwaura Isaac Maigua	ODM
4	Zulekha Hassan Juma	ODM
5	Amina Abdalla	TNA
6	Johnson Sakaja	TNA
7	Janet Marania Teiyaa	TNA
8	Hassan Aden Osman	UDF
9	Sara Korere	URP
10	Abdi Noor Mohammed Ali	URP
11	Sonia Birdi	URP
12	Robert Mutemi Mutua	WDM-K

== Changes during term ==
=== By-elections ===
Constituency	Date	Previous MP	Party	Reason for by-election	New MP	Party
Kibwezi West	17 October 2013	Patrick Mweu Musimba	Independent	Result annulled	Patrick Maweu Musimba	Independent
Matungulu	17 October 2013	Stephen Mule	Wiper Democratic Movement – Kenya	Result annulled	Stephen Mule	Wiper Democratic Movement – Kenya
Bomachoge Borabu	19 December 2013	Joel Onyancha	The National Alliance	Result annulled	Joel Onyancha	The National Alliance
Nyaribari Chache	30 December 2013	Chris Bichage	Orange Democratic Movement	Result annulled	Tong'i Richard Nyagaka	FORD–People
Bonchari	23 June 2014	Zebedeo John Opore	FORD–People	Result annulled	John Oroo Oyioka	Kenya African National Union
Mathare	7 August 2014	George Mike Wanjohi	The National Alliance	Result annulled	Stephen Kariuki	Orange Democratic Movement
Kajiado Central	16 March 2015	Joseph Ole Nkaissery	Orange Democratic Movement	Nkaissery resigned after being appointed to the cabinet	Elijah Memusi	Orange Democratic Movement
Kabete	4 May 2015	George Muchai	The National Alliance	Muchai was killed in February 2015	Ferdinand Waititu	Jubilee Alliance Party
