= Wardey =

Regions with significant populations
- Tana River, Kenya and Jubbaland, Somalia

Languages
- Somali Language

Religion
- Islam (Sunni)

Wardey is an Oromo a subclan associated with the Borana (or sometimes Barentu) branch. They lost their original language and culture, because they were captured and clientized by Somalis during the 19th century. They are mostly found along the Tana River, they're also found in(Waamo) Jubaland Somalia The Wardey are a pastoralist community. They mostly live in Tana River County alongside the Wardey Orma community. They speak the Somali/ Orma language.

== Distribution ==
The Wardey live in the respective cities of Garsen, Afmadow, Kismayo, Dhobley and Bangal.

== Early history ==
Wardey are the early inhabitants of the Jubbaland region, where one of the kings from the Wardey Cali clan by the name Wamo ruled the Jubba regions.

== Reconquest of Jubaland ==
Historically, the Wardey and Orma group were one and were known as Ormo/ Warra Dayya which is where the name Wardey comes from. In the early 19th century they were at the height of their power when they inhabited almost all of the Westbank of Jubba River to their east bordering the powerful Geledi Sultanate. West Jubaland (roughly Northern and Eastern Kenya and South Western Somalia).

In the late 19th century the Darood Somalis particularly belonging to the Ogaden and Marexan sub clans advanced southwards across the Dawa River. The first attempt in 1842 failed, but in 1844 they tried again and were allowed to enter as clients (shegats). The Darod then became herdsboys who were allowed to keep some animals of their own. Then these clients slowly consolidated their numbers until they had achieved parity with or even superiority over the original inhabitants. Around 1865, when smallpox epidemiology weakened the Warra Daya, they were attacked by Darod from the North and to a lesser extent by the Kamba from the West and Maasai from the South. In 1867 the Somali invited the Warra Daya elders for a great peace offering. However, the feast turned out to be an ambush and thousands were slaughtered. Extensive Somali raids followed the offering, and by the end a large scale assimilation of the Wardey population ensued.

=== Aftermath ===
Most of the remaining Warra Daya were forced to cross the River Tana and sought refuge along the southern and eastern banks of the Tana River. Large numbers of Orma men were killed and an estimated 8,000 women and children were captured. In order to protect the remaining free Warra Daya on the east bank of the Tana from the Somali, in 1909 the few remaining Warra Daya on the east bank of the Tana were moved by the British to the west bank. These Warra Daya on the west bank became known as the Tana Orma and are separate from the Wardey group today.

== The Wardey identity ==
Once the Orma fled into the west bank Tana River, the remaining in the Jubba area and the east side of the Tana River became known as Wardey and were clients to the Somalis. However, there here were regularly discussions whether the British should ignore slavery in Juba area or should take action against it. In Tana River District and the North Eastern Province, this discussion focused around the position of the clientized Orma amongst the Somali community. It was clear that the Orma clients had not become clients out of their free will, were in fact slaves and could not leave the Somali. Since these Orma clients were, as long as they adhered to paying tribute and ‘symbolic’ submission, often allowed to live in their own villages and keep livestock. With some pressure of the British the Somali agreed to the Somali-Oromo agreement, which stated that the Orma could return to their brothers on the other side he Tana, provided they left half of their livestock with the Somali. This agreement also implied clearly that the Somali should remain on their bank of the Tana. A good number of the enslaved Orma returned, but since the British had limited military power, they were not in a position to guarantee the return of all the Orma who wanted to cross the river. Initially these back-migrants were called Wardey, also written as Waridei Wardeh and Wardei, etc, and they rejoined the existing Orma.

However in 1939, the Somalis refuted the agreement and no Wardey was able to return until after the independence. In 1971 President Kenyatta officially welcomed the Wardey. Nowadays the term Wardey is mainly used for the clients who returned after Independence. Most of them do not speak Orma. The ones that migrated back during the colonial time are called Orma. Today, they speak Somali and have Somali culture, while claiming the Dir clan and viewing themselves as closer to Somalis than Orma.

== Population ==
Early population figures of the Wardey are unavailable. They were counted under the Orma. The Kenyan colonial government estimated the number of Orma in 1926 at 2,394. In 1932 they were estimated at 5,000. This increase was due to the return of Wardey. The first full count of the Orma took place in 1962. In 1979 they were estimated at 32,000. Between 1969 and 1979 their increase was 96%. This large increase was again due the Wardey returning.. This ‘back-migration’ has continued since. In 2009 the Orma were counted as 74,146. In 2019 their number was 158,993. For the first time the category Wardey was available under the main category Orma and 65,965 of the Orma categorized themselves as Wardey.

== Clan tree ==
- Wardey
  - Bareytimo
  - Irdiid

== Notable people ==
- Dr Nassir Nuh Abdi former MP Bura Constituency and first Speaker County Assembly of Tana River.
- Hon. Ibrahim Sane former MP Garsen Constituency, Tana River, Kenya.
- Boqor Waamo was an ancient Somali king who used to rule Jubaland
- Hon. Yakub Adow Kuno - The Current MP Bura Constituency
- Mohamed Sheikh Abdi Galgalo- First MP of the Wardey Clan.
- Hegano Usman Warday, soldier of Adal Sultanate
