= Abd al-Ali =

ʻAbd al-ʻAlī (ALA-LC romanization of Arabic: عبد العلي, Persian: عبدالعلی), also spelled as Abd ul Ali, Abd ul-Ali, Abd ol Ali, and Abd ol-Ali, is a male Muslim given name. It is built from the Arabic words ʻabd and al-ʻAlī, one of the names of God in the Qur'an, which give rise to the Muslim theophoric names. It means "servant of the most High".

== Given name ==
- Abd al-Ali al-Birjandi, Persian astronomer, mathematician and physicist
- Abd Al-Ali Wadghiri (born 1944), Moroccan academic, writer and linguist
- Abdul Ali Bahari, Kenyan politician
- Abdolali Bazargan (born 1943), Iranian politician
- Abdolali Changiz (born 1959), Iranian footballer
- Abdul Ali Deobandi (1938–2009), Afghan cleric
- Abdol-Ali Mirza Farmanfarmaian (1932–1973), Qajar prince
- Abdelali Kasbane (born 1962), Moroccan runner
- Abdelali Lahrichi (born 1993), Moroccan basketball player
- Abdolali Lotfi (1880–1956), Iranian politician and judge
- Abdul Ali Malik (1907–1993), Pakistan Army engineer officer (served 1947–1974)
- Abdul Ali Mazari (1946–1996), Afghan politician

== Middle name ==
- Khan Abdul Ali Khan (1922–1997), Pashtun educationalist

== Surname ==
- Humayun Abdulali (1914–2001), Indian ornithologist
- Muhammed Abdul Ali (born 1951), Prince of Arcot
- Nacim Abdelali (born 1981), French footballer

== Fictional characters ==
- Abdul Ali from Squid Game season 1, portrayed by Korean-based Indian actor Anupam Tripathi
