= Farah Maalim =

Kenyan politician (born 1956)

Farah Maalim Mohamed فارح معلم محمد
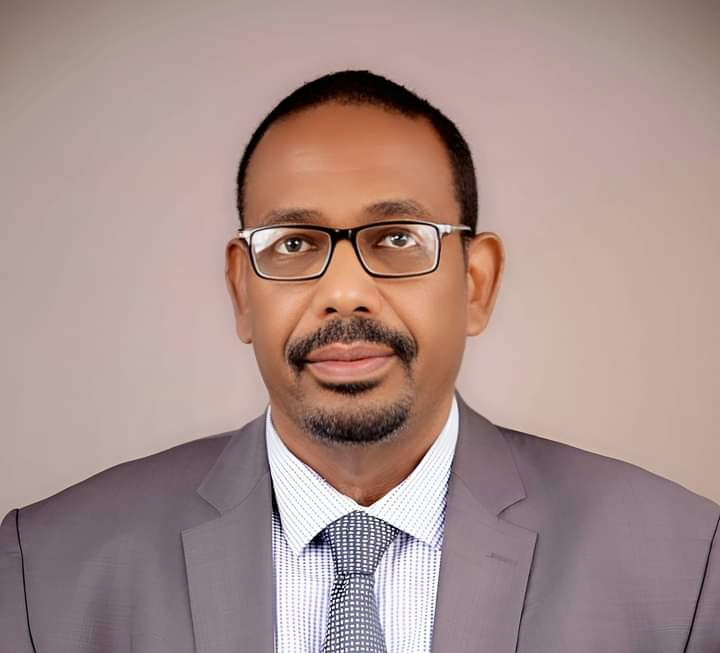

Member of Parliament for Dadaab Constituency
- Incumbent
- Assumed office 9 August 2022
- Preceded by: Mohamed Duale

Deputy Speaker of the National Assembly of Kenya
- In office 15 January 2008 – 14 January 2013
- Preceded by: David Musila
- Succeeded by: Joyce Laboso

Member of Parliament for Lagdera Constituency
- In office 29 December 1992 – 29 December 1997
- Preceded by: Slan Ahmed Nuno
- Succeeded by: Mohamed Shidiye

Personal details
- Born: 1956 (age 69–70)
- Party: Wiper Democratic Movement

Farah Maalim Mohamed (Somali: Faarax Maaliim Maxamed, Arabic: فارح معلم محمد) is a Kenyan veteran politician who has served as the Member of Parliament (MP) for Dadaab Constituency since 9 August 2022. He previously served as MP for Lagdera Constituency from 1992 to 1997, and again from 2007 to 2013. He also served as the Deputy Speaker of the National Assembly of Kenya from 2008 to 2013. He is a Member of the Speaker's Panel and an Advocate of the High Court of Kenya.

== Biography ==
Farah Maalim is of Somali ethnicity, and comes from the Ogaden clan, and Aulihan subclan. He was educated at Maseno School, and he studied for an MA in Development Studies and studied law at the University of Nairobi, before enrolling to the Kenya School of Law for the statutory post graduate law course that is a prerequisite to admission to the Kenyan roll of advocates.

In November 2012, Maalim led a group of MPs, which accused Kenyan soldiers of fomenting violence and using undue force during a security operation in Garissa. The legislators threatened to take the matter to the International Court of Justice (ICJ) if the perpetrators were not brought to justice. Maalim also claimed that the deployment of the soldiers was unconstitutional and had not received the requisite parliamentary approval, and that the ensuing rampage cost Garissa entrepreneurs over Sh1.5 billion to Sh2billion in missed revenue.

In the 2013 elections, Maalim contested for the Garissa County Senate seat, but lost to Yusuf Haji. He changed his political party from the Orange Democratic Movement to the Wiper Democratic Movement in 2016.

In the 2022 elections, Maalim was elected MP for Dadaab. He won against Abdikheir Abdullahi Dubow, who was backed by the former MP, Mohamed Dahir Duale.

He is the former deputy party leader of the Wiper Democratic Movement political party in Kenya.

== Controversy ==
In mid-2024, during nation-wide youth-led protests against the Finance Bill 2024, Maalim faced significant public criticism over viral video footage containing remarks regarding protesters. The statements prompted public outcry and an investigation by the National Cohesion and Integration Commission (NCIC). Maalim maintained his innocence, asserting that the recorded media had been altered and taken out of context by political rivals.
