= 2013 Siaya local elections =

Local elections in Kenya

Local elections were held in Siaya County to elect a Governor and County Assembly on 4 March 2013. Under the new constitution, which was passed in a 2010 referendum, the 2013 general elections were the first in which Governors and members of the County Assemblies for the newly created counties were elected. They will also be the first general elections run by the Independent Electoral and Boundaries Commission(IEBC) which has released the official list of candidates. In March 2013, Rasanga was announced the winner after defeating his key rival William Oduol, who came second with a small margin but showed dissatisfaction in the elections outcome and filed petition against the governor elect in the court of law. He won the case and the court ordered for a by-election in the county, which Amoth Rasanga later emerged victorious to become the first governor for Siaya County.

== Gubernatorial election ==
Candidate	Running Mate	Coalition	Party	Votes
Amoth, Cornel Rasanga	Onyango, Wilson Ouma	Cord	Orange Democratic Movement	--
Obama, Abong'o Malik	Otuko, John Wilfred Owino Sewe		Independent	--
Oduol, William Odhiambo	Ogolla, Nicanor Achola		National Agenda Party	--
Okore, Thomas Paul Molo	Okumu, Vincent Odongo		Kenya National Congress	--
Okwiri, Nellie	Kadima, Eva Ruby		Federal Party of Kenya	--
Winja, Noah Migudo	Winja, Mercy		Independent	--
