= 2013 Tana River local elections =

Local elections in Kenya

Local elections were held in Tana River, Kenya, to elect a governor and county assembly on 4 March 2013. Under the new constitution, which was passed in a 2010 referendum, the 2013 general elections were the first in which governors and members of the county assemblies for the newly created counties were elected.

== Gubernatorial election ==
Candidate	Running mate	Coalition	Party	Votes
Mandara Barisa Badiribu	Medina Halako Twalib		NARC–Kenya	--
Tuneya Hussein Dado	Jire Siyat Mohamed	Cord	Wiper Democratic Movement – Kenya	--
Adam Barissa Dhidha	Hamid Abiyo Morowa	Cord	Orange Democratic Movement	--
Danson Mungatana	Mohamed Mohamud Guracho		The National Alliance	--
Molu Galgalo Shambaro	Khalif Dughali Mohamed		United Republican Party	--
