= Kaarmanbek Kuluev =

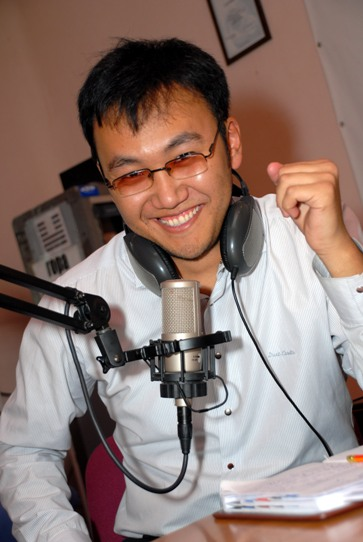

Kaarmanbek Kojogeldievich Kuluev is one of the first multimedia journalists in Kyrgyzstan, working for radio, TV, and Internet sites. In 2009 he won video competition highlighting civil society in action, launched by the OSCE to mark the 20th anniversary of the fall of the Berlin Wall and the Iron Curtain. Currently he is editor at Radio IWPR.

== IWPR ==
Starting in the Fall of 2008, the Institute for War and Peace Reporting launched a radio project. Kuluev was invited to run the radio in Kyrgyzstan. Radio IWPR is one of the few informational programs broadcasting in the Kyrgyz and Russian languages, thus unifying the informational sphere instead of dividing it by language. "We're going to paint radio pictures using sound, allowing listeners to fill in the visual imagery using the mind's eye," said Kuluev in an interview with local press.

== Azattyk ==
Before IWPR, Kuluev worked for the Kyrgyz service of Radio Liberty, which was shut down on National Radio in the Fall of 2008. One of the programs shut down on TV was "Azattyk+", which was established by Sultan Kanazarov, Aida Kasymalieva, and Kuluev. This youth show had been broadcast by National TV since January 2006. From spring 2008, Azattyk also launched its pages on the Facebook and YouTube social networks, which increased their feedback possibilities. Kuluev was the main architect of these platforms. He continued working in multimedia journalism after Radio Liberty and got involved into the Metropolis project of Dutch TV.
