= Jones Mlolwa =

Kenyan politician

Jones Mwagogo Mlolwa

Member of Parliament for Voi Constituency
- In office 2013–2017
- Preceded by: Danson Mwazo Mwakulegwa
- Succeeded by: Khamis Chome
- Constituency: Voi Constituency

Personal details
- Party: Orange Democratic Movement
- Occupation: Politician
- Committees: Departmental Committee on Finance, Planning and Trade

Jones Mwagogo Mlolwa is a Kenyan politician and a member of the 11th parliament of Kenya from Voi Constituency, Taita Taveta County. He was elected on the ticket of Orange Democratic Movement in 2013 defeating the incumbent MP Danson Mwazo Mwakulegwa. In the parliament, Mlolwa served on the Departmental Committee on Finance, Planning and Trade. He was one of the coastal politicians who proposed formation of a Coastal Political Party in 2014 to have a bargaining power with the national government for the benefit of the coastal people. Mlolwa was elected secretary of New Coast Parliamentary Group (CPG) in 2016. He lost his reelection in 2017 and was defeated again in the 2022 parliamentary election by Khamis Chome who polled 9,418 while Mlolwa scored 8,426.
