= Godhana Dhadho Gaddae =

Kenyan politician

- Preceded by: Tuneya Dado

Governor of Tana River County
- In office 22 August 2017 – 2007
- Deputy: Mahad lokha

Member of parliament, Galole Constituency
- In office 7 January 2008 – 4 March 2013
- Succeeded by: Hassan Dukicha

Personal details
- Born: Handampia, tana river county
- Party: Orange Democratic Movement
- Children: 2
- Education: (PhD) Dr
- Website: Http: tana river county

Major (Rtd) Dhadho Gaddae Godhana was elected Tana River county on August 8 Orange Democratic Movement (ODM) Party ticket and takes over from Hussein Dado (Wiper). He is the former Member of Parliament, Galole constituency and Assistant Minister for Communications. Dhadho Gaddae Godhana was sworn in as the Governor of Tana River on August 21, 2017.

Godhana was re-elected in the 9 August 2022 general elections to a second and final term in office.
