= Janet Marania Teyiaa =

Kenyan politician (1980–2025)

2nd Women Representative for Kajiado County
- In office 2017–2022
- Preceded by: Mary Yiane Seneta

Personal details
- Party: Jubilee Party
- Other political affiliations: United Democratic Alliance
- Education: Maasai Technical Training Institute
- Occupation: Politician

Janet Marania Teyiaa (28 September 1980 - 7 April 2025) was a Kenyan politician who served as a nominated Member of Parliament from 2013 to 2017, representing persons with disabilities, and as the Woman Representative for Kajiado County from 2017 to 2022. She was a member of the Jubilee Party.

She was a person living with disability and has been described in sources as the first girl from Ilkilorit village to receive formal education.

== Early life and education ==
Teyiaa attended African Inland Church Boarding School and later Enoomatasiani Secondary School. In 2002, she graduated with an Accountancy Technician Certificate from Maasai Technical Institute.

== Career ==
Teyiaa worked as an office manager at Wezesha Kenya from 2005 and was also involved in adult education. After her tenure in elective politics, she served as a board manager with the National Government Constituencies Development Fund (NG-CDF) until her death.

=== Political career ===
Teyiaa started her political career in 2013 when she was nominated to the National Assembly by The National Alliance (TNA), serving until 2017 as a representative of persons with disabilities. In 2017, she was elected Woman Representative for Kajiado County on a Jubilee Party ticket, winning the seat with 186,085 votes, defeating her closest opponent, Esther Somoire, who received 104,486 votes. During her tenure in Parliament, she served on the Committee on Regional Integration and the Departmental Committee on Labour and Social Welfare and was nominated as a member of the National Government Constituencies Development Fund Board along with Naomi Masitsa Shiyonga.

== Death ==
Teyiaa died on 7 April 2025. Her death was announced by national leaders, including President William Ruto and Deputy President Rigathi Gachagua, who issued tributes describing her as a dedicated public servant and advocate for the rights of persons with disabilities. Former Public Service Cabinet Secretary Justin Muturi also paid tribute, highlighting her role in promoting inclusivity and representing marginalized groups during her time in Parliament.
