= West Herts College =

Further education college in West Hertfordshire, England

Coordinates: 51°39′38″N 0°24′27″W

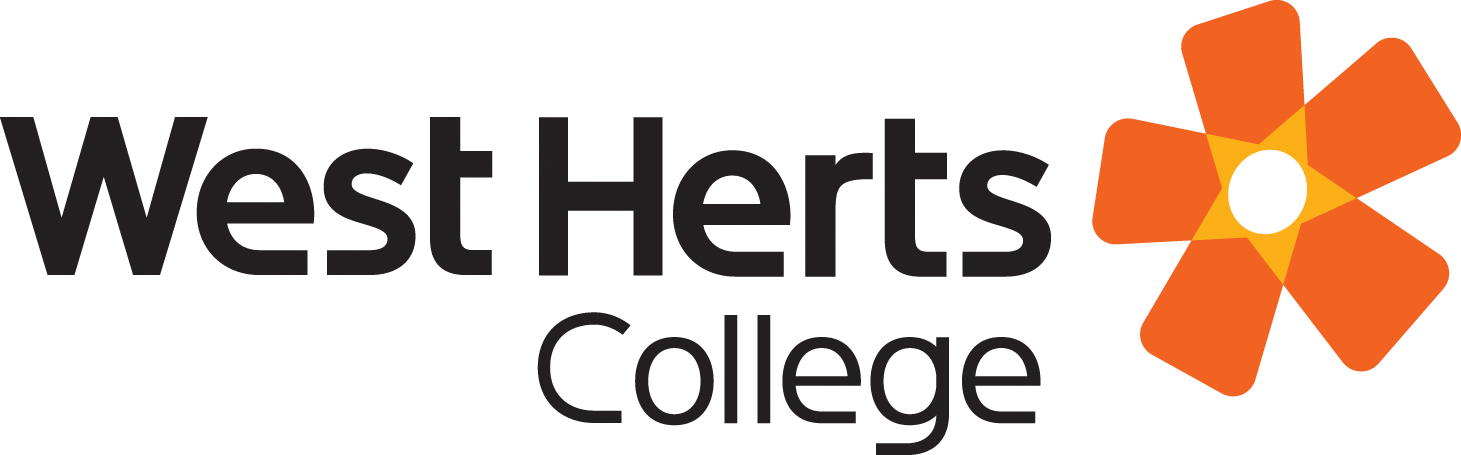

Location
- Hempstead Road; Watford, Hertfordshire, WD17 3EZ; England

Information
- Other names: WHC
- Former name: Watford Library and School of Science and Art; Watford Technical College; Watford College of Technology; George Stephenson College; Watford College; Cassio College; Dacorum College
- Type: Further education
- Motto: Shaping life through learning
- Established: 1991; 35 years ago (WHC); 2019; 7 years ago (WHC Group)
- Local authority: Watford
- Department for Education URN: 130720 Tables
- Ofsted: Reports
- Chairman of the Governors: Phil Thompson
- Principal: Gill Worgan CBE
- Gender: Mixed
- Age range: 16+
- Enrolment: 5,869 (2024)
- Website: www.westherts.ac.uk

West Herts College (WHC) is a further education college in West Hertfordshire, United Kingdom. Established in 1991 through the amalgamation of Watford College, Cassio College and Dacorum College, WHC has campuses in Watford and Hemel Hempstead.

Since 2019, WHC has been a member of the West Herts College Group (WHC Group) together with Barnfield College.

== Range of courses ==
Courses offered are vocational and apprenticeships. The College works with local secondary schools to offer entry to applicants of 16 years of age and older. Some school pupils may transfer their full-time education to the College in order to restart their education or to take some vocational subjects at Level 1, either as full subjects or as "tasters" (to judge suitability). A few GCSE subjects are offered to gifted pupils.

Tertiary qualifications (foundation and extended degrees and Higher National Diplomas) are offered, overseen by the University of Hertfordshire (UH). The foundation degrees may lead on to full BA or BSc awards elsewhere, while extended degrees provide the entry requirements for a degree course at UH. In addition a number of stand-alone courses are offered to part-time students for personal development or leisure.

== History ==
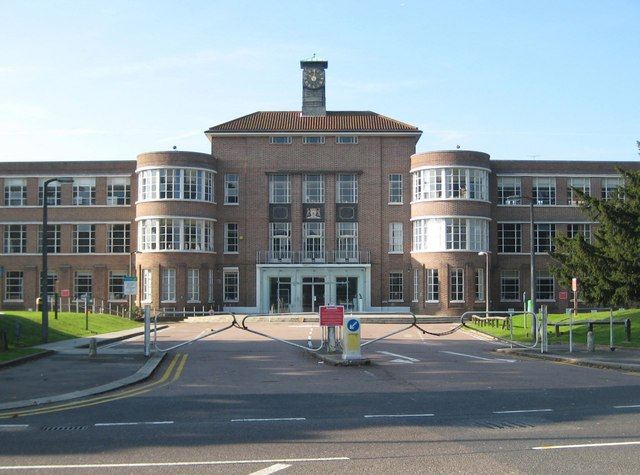
The former Lanchester Building (1938)

The Watford Library and School of Science and Art began in 1874 on Queens Road, Watford. A new building on Hempstead Road for the college was designed by the architects Henry Vaughan Lanchester and Thomas Arthur Lodge and construction of the large, Art Deco-style college, known as the Lanchester Building, began in 1938. The new college was located on former lands of the Cassiobury Estate, sold by the Earl of Essex. Although the stately home was demolished in 1927, the 17th-century dower house, Little Cassiobury, remained. Progress on the new building was interrupted by the advent of World War II and the building remained unfinished throughout the 1940s. Watford Technical College was founded in 1947 but it was not until 1953 that Watford Technical College was officially opened in its new premises.

In the 1980s Watford College of Technology merged with the George Stephenson College (built 1965/66) to form Watford College. West Herts College was established in 1991 as part of the reorganisation of Further Education in Hertfordshire. It was created from the two local colleges Watford College and Cassio College, and Dacorum College in Hemel Hempstead. A new Watford Campus building was constructed in the early 21st century and West Herts College vacated the Lanchester Building; now a locally listed building due to its architectural merit; the Lanchester Building is due to be converted into a primary school.

In 2017 the College was awarded a Gold rating in the Teaching Excellence Framework administered by the Higher Education Funding Council for England. That same year a merger with Stanmore College was announced, but the plans were cancelled after three months.

Former principals include Elizabeth Rushton (2004–2011), Tony Pitcher (2003–2004), and Andrew Bragg (1997–2003).

== Campuses ==
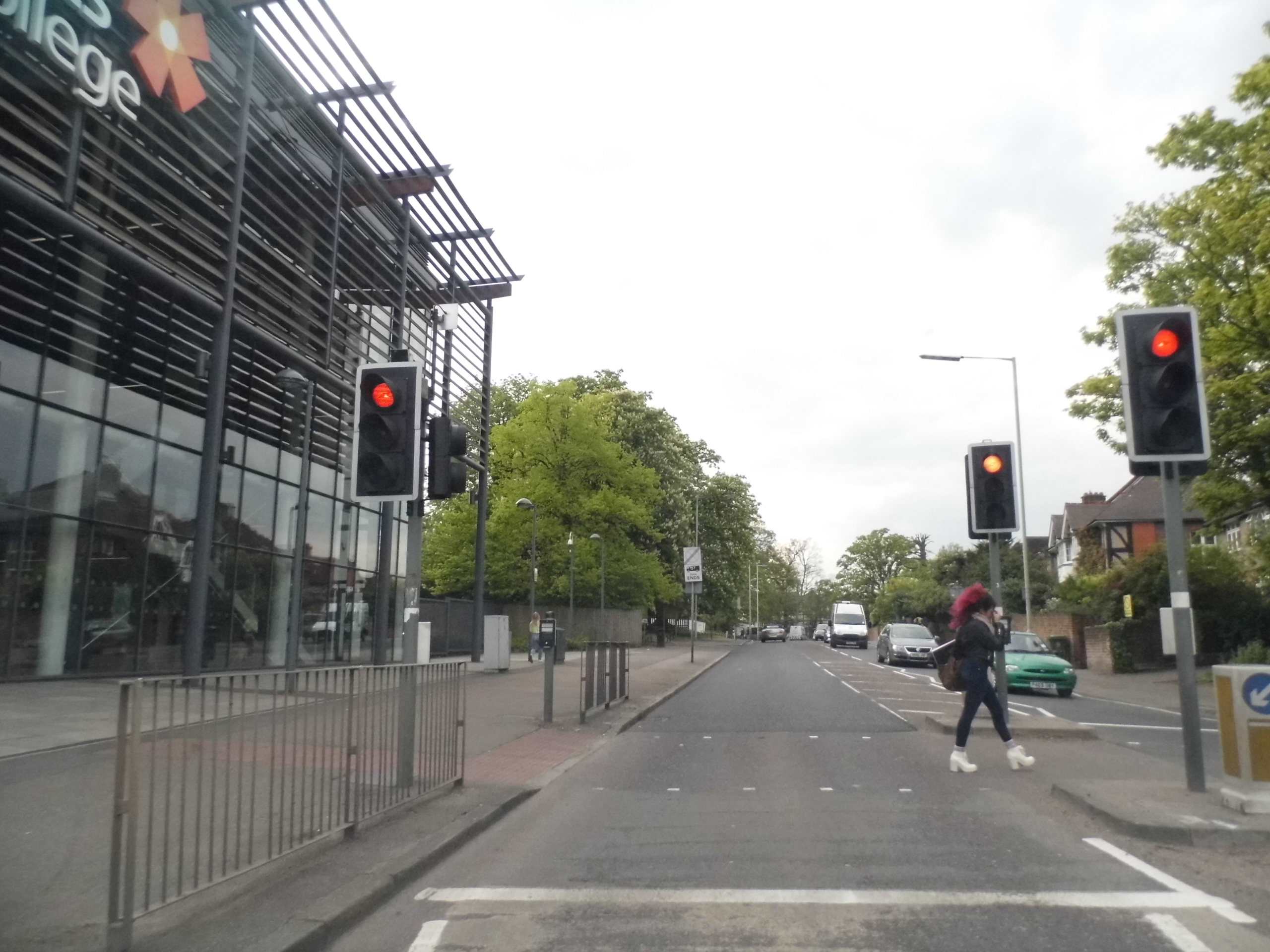
West Herts College Watford Campus

The College has inherited campuses from its predecessors and now occupies sites at Watford (Hempstead Road) and Hemel Hempstead (Marlowes).

In 2020, West Herts College Kings Langley campus was closed with facilities moved to the Hemel Hempstead campus.

== Notable former pupils ==
=== Watford Technical College ===
- John Barnard, engineer and racing car designer
- Jennifer Toombs, artist and stamp designer
- Mike Chaplin, artist
- Parvez Elahi, politician and Chief Minister of Punjab during 2002–2007 and 2022–2023
- David Evans, Baron Evans of Watford, businessperson, politician and Member of the House of Lords
- Zerbanoo Gifford, writer and human rights campaigner
- Anne Noblett, murder victim

=== Watford College ===
- Beatrice Nkatha, politician and county woman representative for Tharaka-Nithi County 2013–2022
- Mary Portas, retail consultant and broadcaster

=== Cassio College ===
- Sir Grant Shapps, politician and Secretary of State for Defence 2023–2024

=== West Herts College ===
- Haissam Hussain, television and film director
- Gail Porter, television personality, model and actress
- Eloise Smith, fencer
- Kelly Smith MBE, footballer and coach
- Ryan Potter and Daniel Dorney, founding members of rock band The Hunna

== Notable former teachers ==
=== Watford Technical College ===
- Raymond Moore, lecturer 1956–1975

=== Dacorum College ===
- Richard Mabey, social studies lecturer

=== West Herts College ===
- Claire Fox. Baroness Fox of Buckley, English language lecturer and ESL teacher 1992–1999
