= Nakuru Town East Constituency =

Nakuru Town East
- constituency
- Country: Kenya
- County: Nakuru County

Nakuru Town East is a constituency in Kenya. It is one of eleven constituencies in Nakuru County. It was created in 2010 after Nakuru Town Constituency was split into Nakuru Town East and Nakuru Town West.

== Members of Parliament ==
Elections	MP	Party	Notes
2013	David Gikaria	JP	
2017	David Gikaria	JP	
2022	David Gikaria	UDA	
