= Raphael Lentimalo =

Kenyan politician

Raphael Lentimalo is a Kenyan politician. He belongs to the Orange Democratic Movement and was elected to represent the Samburu East Constituency in the National Assembly of Kenya since the 2007 Kenyan parliamentary election.
