= Ibrahim Ali Hussein =

Kenyan politician

Ibrahim Ali Hussein (Ibrahim Seer and Haji Ibrahim) is a Kenyan politician who was a member of the Kenyan National Assembly from Wajir West.

He was in the Wajir West Legislature between 1969 and 1973. He was the second MP from Ajuran Community inhabiting the larger Wajir West Constituency.

He was known for championing the rights of the indigenous inhabitants.
