= Beatrice Nkatha =

Kenyan politician (1957–2024)

County woman representative for Tharaka-Nithi County
- In office 2013–2022

Personal details
- Born: December 1957
- Died: 17 October 2024 (aged 66)
- Education: Watford College, ND, 1991; Ferris State University, BA, 1995

Beatrice Nkatha Nyaga (December 1957 – 17 October 2024) was a Kenyan politician from the Jubilee Party.

Nkatha was the woman representative in the Parliament of Kenya for Tharaka-Nithi County from 2013 to 2022. In 2023, Nkatha was appointed a Chief Administrative Secretary (CAS) at the National Treasury. Nkatha died on 17 October 2024, at the age of 66.

In 1991, Nkatha graduated National Diploma in Printing Administration from Watford College. In 1995, Nkatha graduated with a Bachelor of Arts in Security Printing Technology from Ferris State University.

== See also ==
- List of members of the National Assembly of Kenya, 2017–2022
- List of members of the National Assembly of Kenya, 2013–2017
