= Naomi Masitsa Shiyonga =

Kenyan senator

Hon Naomi Masitsa Shiyonga

Senator

Personal details
- Party: Orange Democratic Movement
- Education: Wollongong University Mount Kenya University
- Awards: Global Empowerment Award

Naomi Masitsa Shiyonga is a Kenyan politician who served as a nominated Senator in the Parliament of Kenya under the Orange Democratic Movement (ODM).

== Education ==
Shiyonga attended Ikoli Primary School before proceeding to Shanderema Secondary School. She later obtained a certificate in Health Records and Information Management from the Kenya Medical Training College (KMTC). She holds a degree in Health Records and Information Management from Mount Kenya University and a Master's degree in Health Informatics from the University of Wollongong, Australia.

== Career ==
Before entering politics, Shiyonga worked in Kenya's health sector from 1994 to 2017. She began her career at a local dispensary and later worked at the GSU Headquarters Health Centre in Ruaraka. She also served at the National AIDS and STI Control Programme and the Disease Surveillance and Response Unit (DSRU/DDSR).

== Political career ==
In 2017, Shiyonga was nominated as a Senator in the Parliament of Kenya under the Orange Democratic Movement (ODM). During her tenure, she chaired the Senate Committee on National Cohesion, Equal Opportunity and Regional Integration. She was also nominated as a member of the National Government Constituencies Development Fund Board, alongside Olago Aluoch and Janet Marania Teyiaa.

== Awards and recognition ==
In October 2019, Shiyonga received a Global Empowerment Award from the Americas Empowerment Institute (AEMPIN) in collaboration with Texas Southern Society, in recognition of her contributions to social development.

== See also ==
- Senate of Kenya
- Orange Democratic Movement
