= Mary Yiane Seneta =

Kenyan politician

The Honourable Mary Yiane Seneta

1st Women Representative for Kajiado County
- In office 5 March 2025 – 16 July 2017
- Succeeded by: Janet Marania Teyiaa

Nominated Senator
- In office 31 August 2017 – February 2021
- Nominated by: Jubilee Party

Personal details
- Born: Mary Yiane Seneta Kajiado County
- Citizenship: Kenya
- Party: United Democratic Alliance
- Other political affiliations: Jubilee Party
- Education: University of Nairobi, Bachelor of Education(Arts); University of Nairobi, Diploma in Human Resource Management
- Occupation: Politician; Public servant
- Profession: Teacher

Mary Yiane Seneta is a Kenyan politician and public servant. She was part of the 11th Parliament of Kenya as the women representative for Kajiado County from 2013 to 2017. She won the seat during the 2013 Kenyan general election under The National Alliance party ticket, garnering 123,455 votes to defeat Emilly Maatany Kiparki, Dorothy Mashipei, Lucy Wachuka, Ann Sadere, Gladys Wambui and Jeniffer Sikinan. Seneta was among the ten nominated senators by the Jubilee party in 2017. She is currently serving as a member of the National Land Commission.

== Early life and education ==
She started her primary education in 1980 at Oloturoro Primary in Kajiado North, completing her Kenya Certificate for Primary Education in 1987. She joined Moi Girls Isinya in 1988 for her secondary education and managed to complete the Kenya Certificate for Secondary Education in 1991. After finishing secondary school, Seneta joined Kericho Teachers Training College to study for her P1 Certificate to become a teacher from 1993 to 1995.

Her undergraduate was a bachelor's degree in education (Arts) from the University of Nairobi. She joined the university from 2005 to 2008. In 2009, she enrolled for a postgraduate diploma in human resource management from the University of Nairobi and graduated in 2011.

== Career ==
She was a registered teacher with the Teachers Service Commission from 1995 till 2005 before joining the University of Nairobi.

=== Political career ===
Seneta joined the National Assembly in 2013 after getting elected as the women's representative of Kajiado County. She contested under The National Alliance party ticket, winning with 123,455 votes against Orange Democratic Movement's Emilly Maatany Kipraki, independent candidates Dorothy Mashipei with 43,185, Lucy Wachuka with 6,895, Ann Sadere with 4,687, Gladys Wambui with 2,484 and Jeniffer Sikinan, who had 2,038 votes.

Her National Assembly term ended in 2017 after the 2017 Kenyan general elections in which she decided to contest for the Kajiado East Constituency parliamentary seat but lost on the party primaries to Peris Tobiko, who got 8,833 votes to her 5,499 votes. She contested the primaries in court, but the appeal was dismissed. She managed to join the senate as a nominated candidate for Jubille party. She was expelled by her party over disciplinary issues, gross insubordination and misconduct on 9 February 2021.

She got a second attempt to run for the Kajiado East Constituency parliamentary ticket during the 2022 Kenyan general election as a candidate for the United Democratic Alliance party. Seneta came second, losing to Orange Democratic Movement's Kakuta Hamisi with 28,730 votes to 10,047 votes. On 17 February 2026, President William Ruto nominated Seneta as one of the six members of the National Land Commission.
