= Protus Akujah =

Kenyan politician and Member of Parliament

Hon. Dr. Protus Eweisit Akuja, Ph.D

Member of the National Assembly for Loima Constituency
- Incumbent
- Assumed office 2022
- In office 2013–2017

Personal details
- Born: Loima, Turkana County, Kenya
- Party: United Democratic Alliance (UDA)
- Other political affiliations: Orange Democratic Movement (ODM), Coalition for Reforms and Democracy (CORD)
- Education: Moi University; Van Hall Larenstein University of Applied Sciences; St. Paul’s University
- Occupation: Politician, Development Practitioner

Hon. Dr. Protus Eweisit Akuja, Ph.D (often written as Protus Ewesit Akujah) is a Kenyan politician and a Member of Parliament for the Loima Constituency in Turkana County.

== Early life and education ==
Akuja was born in Loima, Turkana County, Kenya. He attended Lodwar High School and obtained a Kenya Certificate of Secondary Education (KCSE) in 1994.

He studied at Egerton University from 1995–2000 obtaining a diploma. He also obtained a bachelor’s degree in social work and community development from Moi University in 2004 and a master’s degree in rural development and food security from Van Hall Larenstein University of Applied Sciences, Netherlands in 2012. He later obtained a Ph.D in Development Studies from St. Paul’s University, Limuru (2024).

== Political career ==
Akuja was first elected to the National Assembly in 2013 to represent the Loima Constituency. However, he lost his seat in the 2017 general election.

In 2022, he returned to Parliament on a United Democratic Alliance (UDA) ticket.

In Parliament, Akuja has served on the Administration and Internal Security Committee and the National Government Constituencies Development Committee (NG-CDF), committees related to national security, administration, and the implementation of the Constituency Development Fund.

In Parliament, he has advocated for the need to address chronic drought and food insecurity as well as peace initiatives with Kenya's neighbours.

== Personal life ==
Akuja is married and active in the community initiatives in Turkana County.

== See also ==
- Parliament of Kenya
- Turkana County
- United Democratic Alliance
