= Ganze Constituency =

Kenyan electoral constituency

Ganze
- constituency for the Parliament of Kenya
- Ganze Constituency within Kilifi County

- Kilifi County within Kenya
- County: Kilifi
- Population: 143,906
- Area: 3,218 km^{2} (1,242.5 sq mi)

Current constituency
- Number of members: 1
- Party: PAA
- Member of Parliament: Charo Kenneth Kazungu Tungule
- Wards: 4

Ganze Constituency is an electoral constituency in Kenya. It is one of seven constituencies in Kilifi County. The constituency has four wards, all electing representatives for the Kilifi County Assembly. The constituency was established for the 1988 elections. After the IEBC adopted the Boundary commission's recommendation for new constituencies and boundaries, Ganze Constituency retained its name, and no major boundaries were altered. It had a population of 143,906 (66,921 males, 76,981 females and 4 intersex) according to the 2019 census report by the Kenya National bureau of Statistics (KNBS). Its current member of parliament is Hon. Charo Kenneth Kazungu Tungule of Pamoja African alliance Party (PAA).

Sokoke Ward after the March 10, 2013 General Elections, the then Councillor Hon. Teddy Mwambire was re-elected as the new Member of County Assembly (MCA) representing Sokoke Ward in the County Assembly of Kilifi. He is now the Speaker, Kilifi County Assembly.

== Members of Parliament ==
| Elections | MP | Party | Notes |
|---|---|---|---|
| 1988 | Noah Katana Ngala | KANU | One-party system. |
| 1992 | Noah Katana Ngala | KANU | |
| 1997 | Noah Katana Ngala | KANU | |
| 2002 | Joseph Kahindi Kingi | NARC | |
| 2007 | Francis Bayah | KADU-A | |
| 2013 | Peter Safari Shehe | Federal Party of Kenya | |
| 2017 | Teddy Ngumbao Mwambire | ODM | |
| 2022 | Charo Kenneth Kazungu Tungule | PAA | |

== Locations and wards ==
| Locations | Population |
|---|---|
| Bamba | 20,701 |
| Bandari | 8,419 |
| Dungicha | 4,132 |
| Ganze | 10,046 |
| Jaribuni | 6,210 |
| Kauma | 10,797 |
| Mitangani | 7,053 |
| Mrima wa Ndege | 5,577 |
| Mwahera | 16,519 |
| Ndigiria | 8,367 |
| Palakumi | 10,069 |
| Sokoke | 19,351 |
| Vitengeni | 12,171 |
| Total | 139,412 |
1999 census.

| Ward | Registered Voters |
|---|---|
| Bamba | 10,751 |
| Ganze | 8,020 |
| Jaribuni | 6,822 |
| Sokoke | 11,970 |
| Total | 37,563 |
*March 2013.
