= Esther Passaris =

Kenyan politician (born 1964)

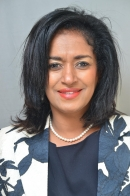

County woman representative of Nairobi City County
- Incumbent
- Assumed office 31 August 2017
- Preceded by: Rachel Shebesh

Personal details
- Born: Esther Mūthoni Passaris; 20 October 1964 (age 61) Mombasa, Kenya
- Party: Orange Democratic Movement (Since 2017)
- Children: 2
- Education: Strathmore University (Advanced Management Program); University of London (Diploma in Law); United States International University Africa (BSc International Business Administration) , Kenya
- Website: esthermpassaris.com

Esther Mūthoni Passaris OGW (born 20 October 1964) is a Kenyan politician, social entrepreneur and philanthropist. She is the Nairobi County woman representative in the bicameral Kenyan parliament, and a member of the Orange Democratic Movement (ODM) Political Party.

In 2013, she ran for member of parliament as a women's representative for Nairobi County, on the Kenya National Congress political party ticket but lost to Rachel Shebesh. She is a public figure in Kenyan business and politics.

== Early life ==
Passaris was born in the coastal city of Mombasa to a Greek father and a Kenyan Kisii mother. She attended the Aga Khan Academies for her primary and secondary education. She enrolled in the Advanced Management Program course at Strathmore Business School, a program that was conducted in December 2006 between Strathmore University and the University of Navarra. She also has a diploma in law from the University of London. In October 2017, Passaris graduated from the United States International University Africa, in Nairobi, with a BSc International Business Administration.

== Public and political career ==
Esther Passaris is a public figure in Kenya, who has sparked some controversy by her statements about other Kenyan politicians and businessmen. She has been a runner-up in Miss Kenya contest and is actively campaigning for the rights of women in Kenya.

Through her Adopt a Light organization, Passaris has signed a deal with Nairobi city authorities in order to: "Restore decrepit street lighting in exchange for advertising rights on the lamp posts."

Passaris ran for the women's representative for Nairobi County during the 2013 Kenyan general election, and was also a candidate for the post of Mayor of Nairobi. She is currently the Nairobi Women's Representative.

Esther speaks about the community and human rights. This makes her spend time with the community, doing mentorship programs and speaking engagements in social forums like Fatuma's Voice. She was also CEO and the founder of "One in a Million" campaign, which was operating under Driving Kenya Forward, a non-profit charitable organization, aimed at fighting development challenges in Kenya, such as poverty and unemployment, and promoting urban and rural development.

She was re-elected in the 2022 general election. She dedicated her victory to her late father.

== Controversy ==
In July 2025 a petition to recall her was filed by a group of young activists for violating several provisions of the Kenyan constitution. She was accused to have undermined peaceful protest and public participation, aligned herself with executive overreach, failed to advocate for Nairobi women during instances of police brutality, spread disinformation, and declined to account for public funds. This came after a bill she sponsored that sought to restrict public picketing and protests from within certain distances of public institutions and offices. The matter still lies with the Electoral Body in Kenya IEBC. In 2019 a leaked phone conversation between her and the then Nairobi governor Mike Sonko implicated her in an extortion and romance scheme. The truth of the scheme remains unknown as she denied any involvement with the governor. In 2021 she sought to have his social media accounts blocked citing that Sonko was using his accounts to abuse of women

== Personal life ==
Passaris has two children (Makenna Ngūgi & Lefteris Ngūgi ) with Kenyan businessman Pius Ngūgi. In 2003, she filed a lawsuit against Ngūgi for a breach of promise to marry, demanding a monthly allowance of KSh. 200,000/= (US$2,000), and a car to take their children to and from school. In August 2011, Passaris was sued by Ngūgi, claiming she continued to demand more money despite agreeing to a truce in their previous case. Passaris' daughter and eldest child, Makenna Ngūgi is a singer.

== Awards ==
- 2016 Most influential women in business and government by CEO Global, South Africa
- 2009 UN Habitat Business Awards by UN Habitat
- 2008 Order of Grand Warrior (OGW) by former President of Kenya, Mwai Kibaki.
