= Gitobu Imanyara =

Kenyan politician

Gitobu Imanyara (born c. 1954) is a Kenyan human rights lawyer, journalist, and politician.

== Biography ==
After Imanyara spent more than two years in Maximum Security Prison on charges associated with his work as a human rights lawyer, he founded the Nairobi Law Monthly in 1987. It was not supportive of Daniel Arap Moi's one party policy and Imanyara was arrested for not registering the magazine. He was again arrested in 1990 after writing a special issue entitled "The Historic Debate: Law, Democracy, and Multi-Party Politics in Kenya." At one point he was held in a prison psychiatric ward, though he re-released the issue following his own release.

Receiving the International Editor of the Year by the World Press Review while in prison, he was called "the boldest voice for a free press in a country whose intolerant government does not hesitate to shut down publications and where most journalists practice self censorship." Imanyara was arrested for a third time in April 1991 after police confiscated the current issue of his journal. The offending information was about the formation of an opposition political party, and Imanyara was unable to notify his family or lawyer. His papers were ransacked without a warrant.

While in custody, Imanyara developed a brain tumor which was treated. Kenyan aid money went down significantly after the arrest, and the U.S. State Department called it "another denial of freedom of expression in Kenya." He was awarded the World Association of Newspapers' Golden Pen of Freedom Award later that year, but due to authorities not allowing him to leave the country for it, Liberal International President Otto Lambsdorff brought it personally to Nairobi in early 1992.

At the Kenyan general elections in December 1997, he won a regional landslide victory and was elected MP for Central Imenti Constituency. He continued to publish his newspaper, which was renamed the Africa Law Review. Imanyara is a member of the International Board of Article XIX, a member of the Advisory Board of the Urban Morgan Institute for Human Rights, and also a member of the Media Institute for the advancement of the freedom of expression.

In January 2008, Imanyara accused the Kenyan first lady Lucy Kibaki of assault and threatened to sue Kibaki over the alleged incident. The first lady was swift to deny the allegations, accusing Imanyara of blackmail after failing to secure the deputy Speaker's seat during the elections in Parliament.
