= Irshadali Sumra =

Kenyan politician

Honourable Irshadali Sumra MP

Member of the Kenyan Parliament
- Incumbent
- Assumed office March 2013
- Constituency: Embakasi South

Personal details
- Born: 9 December 1962 (age 63) Mombasa, Kenya Colony
- Party: ODM
- Education: Penn Foster College; KCA University
- Website: www.sumraforchange.com

Irshadali Mohamed Sumra (born 9 December 1962) is a Kenyan businessman and politician who was elected as a member of the Kenyan Parliament in the 2013 parliamentary elections.
