= Abdul Ali Bahari =

Kenyan politician

Abdul Ali Bahari is a Kenyan politician. A member of the Kenya African National Union, Ali was elected to represent the Isiolo South Constituency in the National Assembly of Kenya in the 2007 parliamentary election.
