= Mburi Muiru =

Kenyan politicians

Mbūri Alex Mūthengi Mūirū (born 23 September 1967 in Tharaka Nithi) is a Kenyan politician and a member of the 10th and 11th parliament of Kenya for Thakara Constituency in Thakara County.

== Education and career ==
Mūirū was born in Tharaka in 1967 and attended Igumo Primary School from 1975 to 1983 before proceeding to Tharaka Boys High School where studied from 1983 to 1986. In 1988, he earned his A-Level certificate from Kanyankine Boys High School and studied at the University of Nairobi for a bachelor's degree from 1989 to 1992. He worked at the Ministry of Lands, Kenya as a settlement officer from 1997 to 2000 and rose through the ranks to the position of principal settlement officer before he resigned in 2007.

He joined politics in 2007 and was elected to the 10th parliament of Kenya for Tharaka Constituency in Tharaka County on the ticket PNU. He was reelected to the house in 2013 on the ticket of United Republican Party (URP) and with the support of Jubilee Coalition. He served on the house committees on Lands and Natural Resources and Liaison 10th parliament (2007 – 2013), and a member of Public Accounts and Committee on Implementation. He is recorded to have spoken in the parliament 767 times from 2008 to 2016.
