= Abdullahi Banticha =

Kenyan politician from Isiolo South

Abdullahi Jaldesa Banticha (born 12 August 1978) is a Kenyan politician and a member of the 11th Kenyan parliament elected from Isiolo South Constituency on the ticket of United Republican Party and with the support of Jubilee Coalition in 2013. He succeeded Abdul Ali of the Kenya African National Union (KANU) party. Banticha served on the house committee on Energy, Communication and Information. According to a report by Mzaledo Trust in 2016, Banticha spoke twice throughout the 11th parliament. He earned his bachelor's degree in education from Maseno University.
