= Bernard Kitungi =

Kenyan politician

Bernard Kitungi is a Kenyan politician. He was a member of the 11th Parliament of Kenya for Mwingi West Constituency in Kitui County. He was elected to Parliament on the ticket of the Wiper Democratic Movement - Kenya (WDM-K), with the support of the CORD Coalition, in 2013.
