= Kenya African Democratic Union – Asili =

Political party in Kenya

The Kenya African Democratic Union – Asili (KADU–Asili) is a political party in Kenya.

== History ==
Established in 2006, KADU–Asili nominated 19 National Assembly candidates for the 2007 general elections, receiving 0.7% of the vote and winning one seat; Francis Bayah in Ganze.

In the 2013 elections the party nominated 15 candidates; it saw its vote share fall to 0.16%, but again won a single seat; Mwinga Gunga Chea in Kaloleni.
