= Victor Munyaka =

Kenyan politician

Hon. Dr. Victor Munyaka

Member of the National Assembly of Kenya
- Incumbent
- Assumed office 2007
- Constituency: Machakos Town Constituency

Personal details
- Born: Kenya
- Party: Jubilee Alliance Party
- Education: University of Nairobi (Veterinary Medicine)
- Profession: Politician, Veterinarian, Businessman
- Known for: Founder of Ngelani Agrochemicals Ltd

Dr Victor Munyaka is a Kenyan politician. He belongs to the Jubilee Alliance Party and was elected to represent the Machakos Town Constituency in the National Assembly of Kenya since the 2007 Kenyan parliamentary election. Munyaka has a degree in Veterinary Medicine from the University of Nairobi.

A trained veterinarian, before venturing into politics Munyaka was a successful businessman operating an agro-vet business in Machakos town under the name "Ngelani Agrochemicals ltd".
