= Samuel Arama =

Kenyan politician

Samuel Arama MP

Member of Parliament for Nakuru Town West
- Incumbent
- Assumed office 4 March 2013
- Majority: 4,611 (6.4%)

Personal details
- Party: Jubilee Party

Samuel Arama is a Kenyan politician who has served as a member of the National Assembly for the Nakuru Town West constituency since 2013. He is a member of the Jubilee Party, having previously represented the Orange Democratic Movement.

== Early life ==
Arama attended Nairobi Technical High School and worked as an accounts clerk at the Ministry of Public Works. Since 1994, he has been Managing Director at Ortama Electrical Supplies and Scomic Computers Stationeries.

== Political career ==
Arama was elected to the national assembly in the 2013 Kenyan General Election, representing the Nakuru Town West constituency as a member of the Orange Democratic Movement. In the 2017 election he was re-elected as a member of the Jubilee Party. A legal challenge to his 2017 re-election was made by the ODM candidate Dr Andrew Isoe Ochoki but this was subsequently withdrawn.

As an MP he has campaigned for the legalisation of the brewing and sale of the traditional brew bussa.

In 2020, he was named as one of 19 members of the National Assembly who have not spoken on the floor of the parliament for the entire parliamentary session. During the COVID-19 pandemic Arama donated food and protective equipment to church pastors in Nakuru.

=== Election results ===
General election 2017: Nakuru Town West
Party	Candidate	Votes	%	±%
Jubilee	Samuel Arama	29,682	41.5	N/A
ODM	Ochoki Andrew Mingate Isoe	25,071	35.0	+0.8
Independent	Joseph Kariko Mwangi	12,766	17.8	N/A
Independent	Erick Otieno Ogada	1,596	2.2	N/A
Independent	Ezekiel Kiprotich Komen	759	1.1	N/A
KANU	Debora Chepngetich Sang	716	1.0	−1.8
Chama Cha Mashinani	Stephen Kipkemoi A Koech	581	0.8	N/A
Amani	Peter Getare Ndubi	218	0.3	N/A
FORD-K	Fravian Wairimu Wacira	169	0.0	N/A
Independent	Sospeter Nyakundi Nyanga Tomato	50	0.1	N/A
Majority		4,611	6.4	
Jubilee gain from ODM		Swing		

General election 2013: Nakuru Town West
Party	Candidate	Votes	%
ODM	Samuel Arama	20,255	34.2
The National Alliance	Charles N. Maisiba	17,837	30.1
United Republican Party	Mohamed Suraw Issak	10,540	17.8
Federal Party Of Kenya	Ojwang James Omondi	2,629	4.4
Narc	Joseph Kariko Mwangi	2,352	4
United Democratic Forum Party	Mike Lumbaso Brawan	2,017	3.4
KANU	William Kibowen Towett	1,667	2.8
Kenya National Congress Party Of Kenya	Victor Warutere	815	1.4
Wiper Democratic Movement- Kenya	Sammy Kipkorir seroney	375	0.6
United Democratic Movement	Raphael Kipsoi Arap Korir	315	0.5
Narc-kenya	Laban Kimathi Mukindia	234	0.4
FORD-K	Sospeter Tomato	128	0.2
Majority		2,418	4.1
Turnout		59,164	82.5%

== Legal incidents ==
In 2015, Arama was accused of assaulting a voter in his constituency and in 2019 was accused of drawing a gun at a political opponent in a Nakuru church.

In June 2018, he was arrested on suspicion of land fraud along with his associate Kennedy Onkoba and detained over a weekend before being released on a Ksh 1m cash bail. He was charged with fraudulently acquiring land and conspiracy to commit fraud. In 2019, he was acquitted due to lack of evidence.
