= Peris Tobiko =

Kenyan politician

Peris Tobiko (born 1969) is a Kenyan politician. She was the first elected female Maasai member of parliament in 2013. She was re-elected for a second term as MP for Kajiado East Constituency in August 2017.

== Early life and education ==
Tobiko was one of four daughters born to her mother. Her father, after being pressured by the many suitors who came to ask for Peris' hand in marriage, almost gave in to their constant requests. This occurred more than three times between the ages of 13 and 18. This would have made her a child bride had her father given in to the demands of the many suitors but luckily, he too believed in the education of the girl child.

Peris convinced her father that marriage was not essential just because she was a girl and it was more important for her to continue to receive the highest education she could and pursue her ambitions first. After she was done with her education and had a career of her own, only then would she consider choosing a husband for herself. All her teachers also supported her and told her father that she was very intelligent and had the potential to excel in her education which she did all through Primary school, Secondary, A-Levels and then up to the University. Citing how female children were treated differently in the patriarchal Maasai community, Tobiko later said, "It was as if girls were not considered to be children." Her father encouraged and supported her throughout her political career until his passing in May 2019.

Tobiko holds both a Bachelor of Arts degree in Political Science and a Master's degree as well also in Political science from the University of Nairobi.

== Career ==
Tobiko worked for the government's pension fund, before running for parliament in 2007. She came third. She served on several boards thereafter including being the chairperson of the TanAthi Water Service board. When she won the party primaries in the next elections in 2013, Maasai elders said they would hold a ceremony to "curse" her and all those who voted for her. She ran for the seat anyway and was elected to represent Kajiado East, defeating her seven male rivals, historically making her the first elected female Maasai member of the National Assembly. She was again re-elected in 2017. She is now known as one of the [Power Women of Kajiado and Kenya.

Her priority through her two terms has been providing Infrastructure: the building of roads like the 111 km Isara - Mashuru - Kajiado road that is the first of its kind in the area, Education: through the focusing of building and upgrading schools and paying bursaries to keep children in school. She has said that she believes the education of girls together with the boys is "one of the factors that can change society." She has won the favour of the public through her honesty and her implementation and provision of services guaranteed to the public and has announced her plans to run against the current incumbent governor of Kajiado County in 2022 for the gubernatorial seat. In the 2022 elections, she was not nominated by the party U.D.A (United Democratic Alliance) in which she had joined. And so her plan was to run independently she is now a nominated senator under UDA party

Tobiko is one of three women featured in the 2017 Thomson Reuters Foundation documentary When Women Rule, alongside Kyrgyzstan MP Aida Kasymalieva and Bolivian mayor Soledad Chapeton. She is also one of 200 renowned Kenyan women featured in the 2019 book, Pioneers & Transformers: The Journeys of Top Achieving Women in Kenya.

== Personal life ==
Tobiko married a man she met at the university after completing her Masters. They have four children together.
