= Patrick Mweu Musimba =

Kenyan politician

The Hon. Dr. Patrick Musimba MP

Member of the National Assembly of Kenya
- Incumbent
- Assumed office March 2013
- Constituency: Kibwezi West Constituency

Personal details
- Born: January 4, 1970 (age 56) Kibwezi, Kenya
- Party: Wiper Democratic Movement-Kenya (since 2019)
- Other political affiliations: Independent (2013–2019)
- Education: University of Nairobi (BCom) Jomo Kenyatta University of Agriculture and Technology (MSc, PhD)
- Occupation: Politician, Entrepreneur
- Known for: Member of Parliament, Business leadership

The Hon. Dr. Patrick Musimba MP (born 4 January 1970 in Kibwezi, Kenya) is a Kenyan politician and former Member of the National Assembly representing the Kibwezi West Constituency in Makueni County.He vied for the gubernatorial seat of Makueni county in the 2022 elections. He was first elected to Parliament in March 2013 as an independent candidate, but announced in June 2019 that he was joining the Wiper party.

Musimba earned a Doctor of Philosophy Degree (PhD) in Entrepreneurship and Enterprise Development, and a Master of Science Degree (MSc) in Entrepreneurship, at the Jomo Kenyatta University of Agriculture and Technology. He also has a Bachelor of Commerce Degree (BCom) from the University of Nairobi.

Musimba is Chairman of Musimba Investment Group, which has interests in technology, security, agro business, mining, energy, sports promotion and ecotourism.
