= David Gikaria =

Kenyan politician

David Gikaria is a Kenyan politician from the United Democratic Alliance. In the 2022 Kenyan general election, he was elected to a third term as Member of Parliament for Nakuru Town East.
