= Grace Jelagat Kipchoim =

Kenyan politician

Grace Jelagat Kimoi Kipchoim (3 January 1962 – 20 April 2018) was a Kenyan representative in the National Assembly of Kenya for Baringo South Constituency constituency. She was a coalition member of the Jubilee Alliance and a member of the United Republican Party (URP). She won the legislative seat while ill and did very few mobile campaigns compared to her main challenger, Charles Kamuren (KANU) who garnered 8,905 votes versus her 9,299 votes. Early in 2018, rumours on social media claimed that she had died, but she came out to defend herself and said they were being peddled by her detractors to tarnish her name. However, on 20 April 2018, she died of cancer while under treatment at Nairobi Hospital.
