= Mohamed Huka Adan =

Kenyan politician

Mohamed Huka Adan was a Kenyan politician and a member of the 11th parliament of Kenya elected from Mandera South Constituency on the ticket of United Republican Party (URP) and with the support of Jubilee Coalition. In the parliament, he served on the house committee on Education, Research and Technology and spoke 63 times in the parliament during the 11th assembly. He died in March 2019 from an undisclosed illness.
