= Abdikadir Ore Ahmed =

Kenyan politician

Member of the Kenyan National Assembly
- In office 2013–2017
- Constituency: Wajir West

Personal details
- Born: 1972 (age 53–54) Giriftu, Wajir County, Kenya
- Party: Orange Democratic Movement (ODM)
- Education: Kenya Medical College (Diploma); University of Dundee (BSc in Medical Services); Kenya Methodist University (MSc in Health Systems Management); Management University of Africa (MSc in Leadership)
- Occupation: Health professional, Politician
- Committees: Administration and National Security

Abdikadir Ore Ahmed (born 1972 in Giriftu, Wajir County) is a Kenyan health professional and politician who was a member of the 11th Kenyan parliament elected from Wajir West Constituency on the ticket of Orange Democratic Movement (ODM) in 2013 with the support of CORD Coalition.

== Biography ==
Abdikadir Ahmed was born in 1972 in Giriftu, Wajir County where he attended Giriftu Primary School from 1979 to 1985. He studied for his Kenya Certificate of Secondary Education (KCSE) at Sabunley Secondary School from 1985 to 1989 and earned a diploma in nursing, nutrition and health systems from Kenya Medical College in 1996. He received a bachelor's degree in medical services from University of Dundee, Scotland in 2007 and master's degrees in health systems management from Kenya Methodist University in 2011, and another in leadership from Management University of Africa in 2016.

He was elected to the Kenyan National Assembly in 2013 on the ticket of ODM and with support of CORD Coalition and served on the house committee on Administration and National Security. He spoke 51 times during the 11th parliament.
