= Mwinga Chea =

Kenyan lawyer and politician

Mwinga Gunga Chea

Member of Parliament for Kaloleni Constituency
- In office 2013–2017
- Preceded by: Kazungu Kambi
- Succeeded by: Paul Katana

Personal details
- Born: 2 November 1975 Kenya
- Died: 27 December 2020 (aged 45) Mombasa, Kenya
- Party: KADU-Asili
- Other political affiliations: Coalition for Reforms and Democracy (CORD)
- Occupation: Lawyer, Politician
- Profession: Lawyer

Mwinga Gunga Chea (2 November 1975 – 27 December 2020) was a Kenyan lawyer and politician who was a member of the 11th parliament of Kenya elected from Kaloleni Constituency, Kilifi County on the ticket of Kenya African Democratic Union-Asili (KADU-Asili) in 2013. He died 2020.

== Career ==
Mwinga Chea was a lawyer and a solicitor of High Court of Kenyan where he practiced under his law firm Gunga & Company Advocates. He was elected to the 11th Kenyan National Assembly for the Kaloleni Constituency seat in the parliament on the ticket of KADU-Asili and with the support of CORD Coalition in 2013. His election victory was challenged in court by a former MP and assistant minister for medical services Samuel Kazungu Kambi on the grounds of low voter turnout due to violence that erupted during voting but failed to upturn the election of Chea. In the parliament, Chea was a member of Catering and Health Club Committee and sponsored a land reform bill to transfer land control from national to county government. Chea died on 27 December 2020 at Mombasa Hospital.

== Read also ==
- Doreen Majala
- William Kamoti
