= Machakos Town Constituency =

Kenyan electoral constituency

Machakos Town
- constituency for the Parliament of Kenya
- Machakos Town Constituency within Machakos County

- Machakos County within Kenya
- County: Machakos
- Population: 170,606
- Area: 280 km^{2} (108.1 sq mi)

Current constituency
- Number of members: 1
- Party: MCC
- Member of Parliament: Caleb Mule
- Wards: 7

Machakos Town Constituency is an electoral constituency in Kenya. It is one of eight constituencies in Machakos County. The constituency was established for the 1988 elections.

== Members of Parliament ==
| Elections | MP | Party | Notes |
|---|---|---|---|
| 1988 | John Kyalo | KANU | One-party system. |
| 1992 | John Kyalo | KANU | |
| 1995 | Alphonce Mbinda Musyoki | KANU | By-elections |
| 1997 | Jonesmus Mwanza Kikuyu | SDP | |
| 2002 | Fredrick Mwanzia Daudi | NARC | |
| 2007 | Victor Munyaka | ODM-K | |
| 2013 | Victor Munyaka | CCU | |
| 2017 | Victor Munyaka | JP | |
| 2022 | Caleb Mule | MCC | |

== Locations ==
Locations
| Location | Population |
|---|---|
| Kalama | 21,702 |
| Katheka Kai | 17,485 |
| Kiima-Kimwe | 22,741 |
| Kimutwa | 17,265 |
| Kola | 14,567 |
| Lumbwa | 13,609 |
| Masaku | 19,980 |
| Mua Hills | 8,579 |
| Mumbuni | 49,802 |
| Muvuti | 12,156 |
| Mutituni | 14,300 |
| Ngelani | 11,989 |
| Total | x |

Wards
| Ward | Registered Voters | County Assembly |
| Kalama | 16,098 | Machakos |
| Mua | 13,992 | Machakos |
| Mutituni | 13,453 | Machakos |
| Kiima-Kimwe / Muvuti | 16,057 | Machakos |
| Machakos Central | 27,204 | Machakos |
| Mumbuni North | 12,640 | Machakos |
| Kola | 10,433 | Machakos |
| Total | 109,877 | |
* June 2017.
