= Wajir West Constituency =

Kenyan electoral constituency

Wajir West
- constituency for the Parliament of Kenya
- Wajir West Constituency within Wajir County

- Wajir County within Kenya
- County: Wajir
- Population: 121,828
- Area: 9,044 km^{2} (3,491.9 sq mi)

Current constituency
- Number of members: 1
- Party: ODM
- Member of Parliament: Yusuf Farah
- Wards: 4

Wajir West Constituency is an electoral constituency in Kenya. It is one of six constituencies in the northeastern Wajir County. The constituency has 12 wards, all electing ward representatives to the Wajir County Assembly. It was established for the 1966 elections. The constituency is predominantly inhabited by Somalis.

The first nominated MP for Wajir West was the first senator Hon Noor Adan Hajji (Noor Ngamia).

== Members of Parliament ==
Elections	MP	Party	Notes
1966	Abdinur Ali	KANU	
1969	Ibrahim Ali Hussein	KANU	One-party system
1974	Abdillahi Abdi Omar	KANU	One-party system
1979	Ahmed Mohamed Khalif	KANU	One-party system
1983	Ahmed Mohamed Khalif	KANU	One-party system.
1988	Abdi Ibrahim Mohamed	KANU	One-party system.
1992	Ahmed Mohamed Khalif	KANU	
1997	Adan Keynan Wehliye	Safina	
2002	Ahmed Mohamed Khalif	NARC	
2007	Adan Keynan Wehliye	KANU	
2013	Abdikadir Ore Ahmed	ODM	
2017	Ahmed Mohamed Kolosh	ODM	
2022	Yussuf Farah Mohamed	ODM	

== Wards ==
Wards
Ward	Registered Voters
Adamsajide	7,340
Arbajahan	7,000
Boji Heri	1,033
Ganyure	2,800
Griftu	2,219
Hadado	7,620
Lakole South	415
Wagalla	3,922
Total	25,220
*September 2005.
