= Gideon Mwiti =

Kenyan businessman and former politician

Gideon Mwiti Irea (6 December 1960 – 25 July 2021) was a member of Parliament in Kenya. He represented Central Imenti Constituency. Mwiti Irea has been the subject of numerous legal troubles, being accused of sexual misconduct and financial fraud.

== Education ==
Mwiti Irea holds a Bachelor of Arts from Daystar University and a degree in Public Relations from the Institute of Commercial Management (ICM-UK).

== Political life ==
Mwiti Irea won the Imenti Central Parliamentary seat during the 2013 Kenyan general elections via the Alliance Party of Kenya. As of February 2015, he had made 56 contributions at the floor of the house. He unsuccessfully ran for re-election in 2017, coming in 4th behind Moses Kirima Nguchine of the Jubilee Party, the independent Makathimo Mwenda Kiambi, and the PNU's Mbaya Julius Kimathi. He subsequently retired from politics in 2017. Mwiti Irea was known as "Livondo" due to his reportedly flashy lifestyle.

== Rape allegations ==
It is alleged that Mwiti Irea assaulted and raped a journalist in his office on March 22, 2015. He was charged in court on April 2, 2015 and was accused of subjecting a former journalist to an involuntary HIV test and then later assaulting her. In 2018, Mwiti Irea was charged with rape.

== Fraud accusations ==
=== Kenya Akiba Microfinance Ltd. ===
In 2004, Mwiti Irea incoporated Kenya Akiba Microfinance Ltd. as a Hire Purchase business. In 2005, the Banking Fraud Investigation Unit (BFIU) and Central Bank of Kenya (CBK) shut down Kenya Akiba Microfinance Limited on suspicion of acting as a bank while not possessing the proper licenses and registrations to act as one. In 2005, Mwiti Irea filed a KShs. 930 million suit against the BFIU and CBK alleging that the seizure of Kenya Akiba Microfinance Ltd.'s assets was illegal and unjustified. Kenya Akiba Microfinance Ltd. abandoned this suit and filed a second one on 9 April 2010, now seeking KShs. 2 billion in damages. The firm abandoned this suit as well in favour of another suit filed on 28 October 2011. This suit was filed after the directors, including Mwiti Irea, were acquitted in the criminal case of Republic v Gideon Mwiti Irea & 3 Others. In 2012, the judge in the suit ruled in favour of Mwiti Irea, claiming that the CBK did not explicitly deny that Kenya Akiba Microfinance Ltd. was conducting Hire Purchase business. However, the CBK challenged the ruling. In 2013, a new judge ruled that the case had been rushed without adequate consideration of whether Kenya Akiba Microfinance Ltd. was in breach of the Banking Act.

In 2022, more than sixteen years after the initial seizure by the BFIU and CBK, the High Court at Machakos ruled that Kenya Akiba Microfinance Ltd. infringed the provisions of the Banking Act by operating as a bank, and that the search and seizure by the BFIU and CBK were lawful.

=== Kenya Business Community Sacco ===
In 2013, Mwiti Irea was acquitted in the case of the Kenya Business Community Sacco Ponzi scheme.

== Death ==
Mwiti Irea died on 25 July 2021 at the Kenyatta University Teaching, Referral and Research Hospital in Nairobi due to diabetes-related complications.
