= Aida Kasymalieva =

Kyrgyz journalist and politician

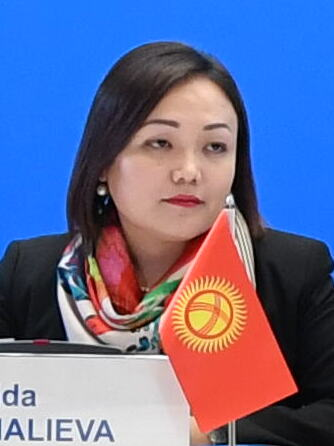
Kasymalieva in 2019

Aida Kasymalieva (Kyrgyz: Аида Касымалиева, born 1984) is a Kyrgyz journalist and politician who has been deputy speaker of the Supreme Council since December 2018. She has been an advocate for women's rights in the context of domestic violence, bride kidnapping and child marriages within her country.

== Education and early career ==
Kasymalieva graduated with a degree in journalism with honours from the Bishkek Humanities University in 2005.

Kasymalieva worked as a journalist for over ten years, reporting on child marriage and the abduction of young women into forced marriages. She worked for Osh TV in Kyrgyzstan. She reported extensively on the lives of female migrants in Russia. In 2012, Kasymalieva was working in Moscow for Radio Azattyk and came across a video on Twitter of a Kyrgyz woman being beaten in Yekaterinburg for speaking Tajik. Due to Kasymalieva's investigation, more similar videos emerged and a documentary was aired on Kyrgyz National TV on 29 May 2012. After this, numbers of victims began filing police complaints. Kasymalieva partnered with women's rights organisation Urgent Action Fund to raise money for legal assistance and psychological support for the victim in the original video.

In 2005, at age 20, Kasymalieva was highly commended at the Developing Asia Journalism Awards and in 2006 she was second runner up in the Women and Development category for her feature on growing alcohol problems among Kyrgyzstan's rural women. In 2016, Kasymalieva received an award from the Embassy of Switzerland for best TV/radio material about violence against women and girls.

== Political career ==
In 2005 the Kyrgyz parliament was all men, but after a number of campaigns, a gender quota was adopted requiring women to make up one third of party candidate lists. Kasymalieva stood for the Social Democratic Party of Kyrgyzstan in the parliamentary elections of 2015, but was not immediately elected as she was 52nd on the party's candidate list and the party won 38 seats. After other candidates were assigned various political roles, she entered the parliament in 2017, becoming the country's youngest female member of parliament. As a member of parliament, she has made domestic violence and child marriage key issues. In 2017, she spoke on women's issues at a parliamentary session and all her male colleagues walked out. She said, "We were discussing assignments, grants, roads, and all men were sitting in the hall then the parliamentary hour (on gender issues) started ... and all men in the hall just stood up and went."

After criticising the government as a journalist, Kasymalieva said people expected her to be an "opposing politician", but she has chosen to be a "centrist" She is a member of the Forum of Women MPs, a multi-party caucus formed in 2011, which has secured increased legal protection for women and girls on a number of issues. As a result, Kyrgyzstan banned bride kidnapping and religious child marriages in 2016. In October 2018, the Minister of Labor and Social Development, Taalaikul Isakunova, resigned after Kasymalieva showed that she had violated protocol, using her diplomatic passport to travel on holiday. Two deputy ministers also resigned after Kasymalieva filed requests for information about the ministry leadership's foreign travel.

In December 2018, Kasymalieva was elected Vice Speaker of the Parliament of Kyrgyzstan, with 91 deputies voting for her candidacy and 16 against. In February 2019, Kasymalieva was one of the speakers at the International Conference on Universal Child Grants in Geneva. She is chair of the oversight and monitoring group ensuring execution of the National Action Plan on Open Government and a member of the Committee on Social Affairs, Education, Science, Culture and Health.

In 2020, Kasymalieva joined the Unity party.

In 2022, Kasymalieva became the new Ambassador of Kyrgyzstan to the United Nations after presenting her credentials to UN Secretary-General António Guterres on 15 February.

== Personal life ==
Kasymalieva is married and has a daughter. They previously lived and worked in Dubai. In 2011, Kasymalieva was working in Moscow and wrote about the challenges of bringing her then five-year old daughter from Bishkek where she had been living with her grandparents and the racism she experienced.

Kasymalieva is one of three women featured in the 2017 Thomson Reuters Foundation documentary When Women Rule, alongside Kenyan MP Peris Tobiko and Bolivian mayor Soledad Chapeton.

== Selected publications ==
- Saralaeva, L.; Kasymalieva, A.; Toralieva, G.; Turdueva, A. (2005). Prison Riot Sparks Political Row in Kyrgyzstan. Institute for War and Peace Reporting.
- Saralaeva, Leila; Kasymalieva, Aida; Toralieva, Gulnura (2006). Kyrgyz Premier Orders Mafia Clampdown. Vol. 14. Institute for War and Peace Reporting.
- Kasymalieva, Aida; Marat, Erica (2012). "Atambayev invites Turkey to decide on US Transit Center's future". European Dialogue. 30.
