= Mohamed Duale =

Kenyan surgeon and politician

Mohamed Dahir Duale (born 13 July 1962 in Garissa) is a Kenyan health professional and politician. He is a member of the Kenyan national Assembly from Dadaab Constituency elected on the ticket of Orange Democratic Movement (ODM). Before joining politics, he worked in various capacities with Kenyan Ministry of Health and World Health Organization (WHO).

== Education and career ==
Mohamed Duale was born in 1962 in Garissa where he was educated at Garissa Boys Town Primary School before proceeding to Garbatula High School where studied for his O-Level and A-Level from 1978 to 1983. He earned a bachelor's degree in medicine and surgery form University of Nairobi in 1990 and studied for a master's degree in public health at the University of Leeds, United Kingdom from 1997 to 1998.

He started his medical career in 1990 with Kenyan Ministry of health in various capacities in different public hospitals in Kenya until 1994. He was district medical officer between 1995 and 1996 when he became provincial medical officer, North Eastern Province. In 1997, he proceeded on a study leave and returned in 1999 serving until 2001 when he joined the WHO as national surveillance officer and remained in this position until 2006. He joined Kenya Red Cross in 2008 and served in different positions including chairman Kenya Red Cross, North Eastern Province and member of its National Executive Council in Kenya.

He joined politics in 2013 and was nominated by Orange Democratic Movement and CORD Coalition to run for the newly created Dadaab Constituency which he won. In the 11th parliament, he served on the house committee on health.
