= Ali Rasso Dido =

Kenyan politician

Member of the National Assembly
- Incumbent
- Assumed office 4 March 2013
- Constituency: Saku

Personal details
- Born: 23 October 1961 (age 64)
- Party: United Republican Party
- Education: King's College London; Open University; University of Nairobi

Ali Rasso Dido (born 23 October 1961) is a Kenyan politician who has been United Republican Party member of the National Assembly for Saku since March 2013.

He was educated at King's College London (MA Defence Studies, 1999) the Open University (MBA, 2003) and the University of Nairobi.
