= Lagdera Constituency =

Kenyan electoral constituency

Lagdera
- constituency for the Parliament of Kenya
- Lagdera Constituency within Garissa County

- Garissa County within Kenya
- County: Garissa
- Population: 50,315
- Area: 6,096 km^{2} (2,353.7 sq mi)

Current constituency
- Number of members: 1
- Party: ODM
- Member of Parliament: Abdikadir Hussein Mohamed
- Wards: 6

Lagdera Constituency (Formerly Garissa North) is an electoral constituency in Kenya. It is one of six constituencies in Garissa County. The constituency was renamed in 1988. The constituency has ten wards, all electing ward representatives for the Garissa County Assembly.

== Members of Parliament ==
Elections	MP	Party	Notes
1988	Slan Ahmed Nuno	KANU	One-party system.
1992	Farah Maalim	Ford-Kenya	
1997	Mohamed Mukhtar Shidiye	KANU	
2002	Abdillahi Sheikh Dahir	KANU	
2007	Farah Maalim	ODM	
2013	Mohamed Muktar Shidiye	TNA	
2017	Mohamed Hire	KANU	
2022	Abdikadir Hussein mohamed(Arabdur)	ODM	

== Locations and wards ==
	Locations
Population*	Location
3,865	Abakaile
1,494	Alango Arba
10,685	Banane
5,790	Baraki
86,209	Dadaab
64,155	Dagahaley
10,075	Damajale
5,783	Dertu
8,669	Eldere
5,436	Gurufa
10,532	Goreale
7,074	Ilan
6,462	Kulan
4,711	Kumahuto
3,007	Labisigale
11,441	Liboi
4,335	Maalimin
12,513	Modogashe
2,488	Tokojo
x	Total
	1999 census.

Wards
Ward	Registered Voters
Goreale	1,409
Baraki	4244
maalimin	4498
Sabena	7536
Modogashe	4803
Bananey	3759
Total	21,054
*September 2005.
