= Elias Shill =

Kenyan politician

Elias Bare Shill is a Kenyan politician and member of the 11th Kenyan parliament.

== Career ==
Shill served as an advisor on Somalia relations to the Kenyan Prime Minister during the Grand Coalition Government. He was elected to the 11th National Assembly on the ticket of United Republican Party (URP) and with the support of Jubilee Coalition. He served as vice chairman of house committee on Defence and Foreign Relations and a member of Procedure and House Rules Committee.
