= Galole Constituency =

Kenyan electoral constituency

Galole Constituency is an electoral constituency in Kenya. It is one of three constituencies in Tana River County. The constituency has eight wards, all electing ward representatives to the Tana River County Assembly. The constituency was established for the 1988 elections.

== Members of Parliament ==
Elections	MP	Party	Notes
1988	Mohamed Abdi Galgallo	KANU	One-party system.
1992	Tola Mugava Kofa	KANU	
1997	Tola Mugava Kofa	KANU	
2002	Tola Mugava Kofa	KANU	
2007	Godhana Dhadho Gaddae	ODM	
2013	Hassan Dukicha	UDF	
2017	Said Buya Hiribae	FORD Kenya	12th Parliament of Kenya
2022	Said Hiribae	ODM	13th Parliament of Kenya

== Wards ==
Wards
Ward	Registered Voters
Chewani / Kiarukungu	2,194
Chifiri	793
Gwano	1,530
Kinakomba	2,136
Milalulu	2,960
Ndura	1,885
Wayu	4,621
Zubaki / Mikinduni	4,183
Total	20,302
*September 2005.
