= Central Imenti Constituency =

Electoral constituency in Meru County, Kenya

Central Imenti
- constituency for the Parliament of Kenya
- Central Imenti Constituency within Meru County

- Meru County within Kenya
- County: Meru

Current constituency
- Number of members: 1
- Party: UDA
- Member of Parliament: John Paul Mwirigi
- Wards: 4

Central Imenti is an electoral constituency in Kenya. It is one of nine constituencies of Meru County. It has four wards, all of which elect members' of county assembly for the Meru County Assembly. The constituency was established for the 1988 elections.

Central Imenti was one of three constituencies of the former Meru Central District.

== Members of Parliament ==
Elections	MP	Party	Notes
1988	Kirugi Laiboni M’Mukindia	KANU	One-party system.
1992	Kirugi Laiboni M’Mukindia	KANU	
1997	Gitobu Imanyara	FORD-K	
2002	Kirugi Laiboni M’Mukindia	NARC	
2007	Gitobu Imanyara	PNU	
2013	Gideon Mwiti	APK	
2017	Moses Kirima Nguchine	JP	
2022	John Paul Mwirigi	UDA	

== Wards ==
There are 4 wards in Central Imenti Constituency: Abothuguchi West, Abothuguchi Central, Mwaganthia, and Kiagu. As of 2022, there are 76,495 registered voters in the constituency.

Ward	Registered Voters
Abothuguchi West	24,723
Abothuguchi Central	24,397
Mwanganthia	15,057
Kiagu	12,318
Total	76,495
*As of 2022
