= Ibrahim Sane =

Kenyan politician

Ibrahim Ahmed Sane (born 23 June 1974 in Hola Tana, River County) is a Kenyan politician and a member of the 11th parliament elected from Garsen Constituency on the tick of URP in 2013. He is an activist against cultural practices including early girl child marriage.

== Education and career ==
Ibrahim Sane attended Hara Primary School from 1983 to 1990 before proceeding to Hola Secondary School where he studied from 1991 to 1994 when he sat for KCSE exams. He studied for a diploma in conflict management at Vision Empowerment Training Institute from 2008 to 2010.

He contested and won Garsen Constituency seat in the Kenya National Assembly on the ticket of URP in 2013. In the parliament, he was a member of Departmental Committee on Defence and Foreign Relations. he was projected a formidable candidate to challenge incumbent governor Hussein Dado for the seat in 2017 but failed to run.
