= Ali Wario =

Kenyan politician

Ali Wario (born 5 May 1970 in Bura) is a Kenyan politician and a member of the 9th and 11th Parliament of Kenya. He was an assistant minister for Home Affairs from 2003 to 2006. Wario joined politics in 2002 and won Bura Constituency seat to the 9th Kenyan national assembly on the ticket of Kenya African National Union (KANU) party ticket in 2002. He lost his reelection to Nassir Nuh Abdi in 2007 but reclaimed the seat in the 2013 election to the 11th parliament on the ticket of The National Alliance (TNA) in the Jubilee Coalition. He was appointed Assistant Minister of Home Affairs in 2003 and served until 2006 when he was redeployed as an Assistant Minister for Special Programmes. He was a member of Departmental Committee on Public Works, Roads & Transport in the 11th parliament.

== Education and career ==
Ali Wario was born in 1970 in Bura, Tana River County and had his education at Mororo Primary School from 1978 to 1985. He earned his KCSE from Tarasaa High School in 1990 and a diploma in social work from University of Nairobi in 2010 before enrolling for a bachelor's degree in political science. Wario worked with the Kenya Red Cross from 1993 to 1996 and served as chairman of Cofi SACCO from 2009 to 2012. He was a member of the Board of Directors of Kenya National Training Corporation and chaired Board of Directors of Kenya Livestock Marketing Council and African Union Specialties Task Force on Pastoral Policy Initiative.

Wario joined politics in 2002 and won Bura Constituency seat to the 9th Kenyan national assembly on the ticket of Kenya African National Union (KANU) party ticket in 2002. He lost his reelection to Nassir Nuh Abdi in 2007 but reclaimed the seat in the 2013 election to the 11th parliament on the ticket of The National Alliance (TNA) in the Jubilee Coalition. He was appointed Assistant Minister of Home Affairs in 2003 and served until 2006 when he was redeployed as an Assistant Minister for Special Programmes. He was a member of Departmental Committee on Public Works, Roads & Transport in the 11th parliament.
