= Abd Al-Ali Wadghiri =

Moroccan academic, writer and linguist

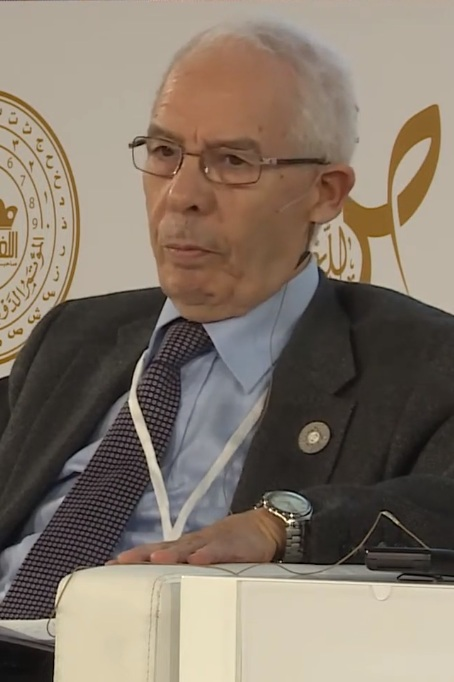
- Born: 22 January 1944 (age 82); Morocco, Fez
- Employer: Islamic University of Niger
- Known for: Professor of Linguistics, specializing in Lexical Studies
- Awards: King Faisal International Prize in Arabic Language and Literature

Abd Al-Ali Wadghiri (born 22 January 1944) Moroccan academic, writer and linguist.

== Biography ==
Wadghiri was born in the outskirts of Fez, Morocco and studied in Fez, Rabat and Paris, he obtained a BA in Arabic literature in 1970, and a doctorate in the third corps in 1976, state doctorate in Arabic language and literature in 1986. He continued his postgraduate studies at the Sorbonne universities in Paris and Muhammad ben Abdullah University in Fez, and Mohammed V University in Rabat.

Wadghiri worked as a professor of secondary and university education in the Faculties of Arts in Fez and Rabat. He also worked as an advisor to the Moroccan Ministry of Cultural Affairs, a General Secretary of the National Committee for Culture, a former member of the Executive Office of the Union of Moroccan Writers, and a founding member of the Union of Moroccan Linguists. He published Al-Mawqif magazine and has served as its director since 1987. He held the position of President of the International Islamic University in Niger (affiliated with the Organization of the Islamic Conference) from 1994 to 2005, and Director of the Allal El Fassi Foundation in Rabat from 2006 to 2008.

== Writings ==
He published his poems, his literary and linguistic research in many Moroccan and Arab newspapers and magazines.

== Poetry collection ==
• "al mawtu fi qarya ramadya" (Death in a Gray Village) (1980)

• "lahdhatun okhra" (Another Moment) (1995)

== Literary and linguistic research ==
• Abu "Abu Ali AL Qali wa atharuhu ala al dirasat al lisanya wa al adabya" (Ali Al-Qali and its Impact on Linguistic and Literary Studies) (1976)

• "qira’at fi adab Al Sabagh" (Readings in Al-Sabbagh's Literature) (1977)

• "Al moejam Al Arabi bi Al Andalous" (The Arabic Dictionary of Andalusia) (1984)

• "qadaya al moejam al arabi fi kitabat Ibn Al Tayyib" (Issues of the Arabic lexicon in the writings of Ibn al-Tayyib) (1989)

· "al taerif bi Ibn Al Tayyib" (Introducing Ibn al-Tayyib) (1990)

• "al frankofonya wa al syasa al loghawya wa al taelimia al faransya bi al maghreb" (Francophonie and French language and educational policy in Morocco) (1993)

• "al logha wa al din wa alhawya" (Language, Religion and Identity) (2000)

• "al daewa ila al darija fi al maghreb – al jodor, al imtidadat, al ahdaf wa al masawighat" (The call to darija in Morocco – roots and extensions, goals and justifications) (2011)

• "al logha al arabya wa al thaqafa al islamya bi al gharb al ifriqi wa malamih mina al ta’athir al maghrebi" ( The Arabic language and Islamic culture in West Africa and features of Moroccan influence) (2011)

• "al logha al arabya fi marahil al doef wa al tabaeya" (The Arabic Language in the Stages of Weakness and Dependency) (2013)

• "loghatu al umma wa al logha al umme" (Nation's language and mother tongue) (2013)

• "nahwa moejam tarikhi li al logha al arabya" (Towards a Historical Dictionary of the Arabic Language), along with a group of authors (2014)

• al arabyat al moghtaribat qamus ta’athili li al alfaz al faransya zat al asl al arabi aw al mo’arrabb" (Arab Expatriates: An Ethnographic and Historical Dictionary of French Words of Arabic or Arabized Origin) (2018)

== Awards ==
• Morocco Prize for Literature 1977.

• The Moroccan Grand Prize for Literature 1989.

• Morocco Book Award 2014, Literary and Linguistic Studies Department, for a book:"al logha al arabya fi marahil al doef wa al tabaeya" (The Arabic Language in the Stages of Weakness and Dependency)

• ALECSO-Sharjah Prize for Linguistic and Lexical Studies for the year 2018, "mihwar al dirasat fi al muejam al taarikhii li al lugha al arabia" (The focus of studies in the historical dictionary of the Arabic language)
