= Danson Mwazo Mwakulegwa =

Kenyan politician

Danson Mwazo Mwakulegwa is a Kenyan politician. He belongs to the Orange Democratic Movement and was elected to represent the Voi Constituency in the National Assembly of Kenya in the 2007 Kenyan parliamentary election. He served for one 5-year term.
