= Hassan Dukicha =

Kenyan politician

Hassan Abdi Dukicha (born 22 August 1971 in Galole, Tana River County) is a Kenyan politician. He was a member of the 11th parliament of Kenya elected from Galole Constituency, on a ticket of United Democratic Forum (UDF) party with the support of Amani Coalition in 2013. He ran for the Tana River senate seat in 2022 but lost to the incumbent.

== Education and career ==
Hassan Dukicha was born in 1971 in Galole, Tana River County. He attended Mau Mau Secondary School from 1987 to 1990 before proceeding to Kenya College of Communication Technology (KCCT) in Mbagathi from 1992 to 1994. He studied at the Kenya Institute of Management (KIM) in Nairobi from 2009 to 2010. Dukicha worked with Telco Kenya from 1992 to 2004 when he switched to Voluntary Community Development and worked there until 2006.

He was elected to the 11th parliament in the 2013 election for the Galole Constituency on the ticket of UDF and Amani Coalition. In the parliament, Dukicha was a member of Departmental Committee on Environment & Natural Resources, and Catering and Health Club Committee and aligned with the Jubilee Coalition of President Uhuru Kenyatta. In 2014, he opposed opposition's calls for a referendum to amend the constitution calling the move an attempt by CORD to derail Jubilee government. His first year in office was focused on completing projects left by his predecessor. He ran for the Tana River senate seat in 2022 but was defeated by Danson Mungatana of the UDA who scored 34,129 votes while Dukicha of the Jubilee Coalition polled 18,082 votes.
