= Julius Ndegwa =

Kenyan politician

Julius Kariuki Ndegwa is a Kenyan politician and a member of 11th parliament of Kenya for Lamu West Constituency. He was elected to the national assembly on the ticket of Kenya National Congress party and with support of the Eagle Coalition.

Born in Mpeketoni in Lamu county, Ndegwa attended Lamu Boys High School. He started his political career as a councilor before being elected to the national assembly in 2013.
