= Rachel Shebesh =

Kenyan politician

Rachael Wambui Shebesh

Nairobi County Woman Representative
- In office 2013–2017
- Preceded by: Position established

Personal details
- Born: July 1, 1971 (age 55) Kenya
- Spouse: Frank Shebesh
- Education: University of Nairobi
- Occupation: Politician, Administrator
- Profession: Political Scientist
- Known for: UN Champion for Risk Reduction in Africa, Adviser to UNIFEM

Rachael Wambui Shebesh is a Kenyan politician. She was the first Nairobi county woman representative, from 2013 to 2017. On 30 October 2021, The CAS, who is married to Frank Shebesh held a colourful traditional wedding ceremony at her parents' home in Githunguri where she marked her completion of marriage rites.

== Early life and education ==
Shebesh was born on 1 July 1971. She attended her primary at Lavington Primary school from 1977 to 1985. She furthered her education at Kianda school from 1991 to 1993, and in the year 2007 she enrolled for a bachelor of arts in political science at the University of Nairobi.

== Career ==
Shebesh was appointed in 2007 as the UN champion for risk reduction in Africa. She currently oversees the administration in the ministry of public service, youth and gender affairs. She is committed to the Kenyan Disability Network and also plays roles of an adviser to UNIFEM. Before she engaged in politics, Shebesh served as an administrator at Marion schools and ran a fashion and design company.

== See also ==
- Esther Passaris
