= Eldas Constituency =

Electoral constituency of Kenya

Eldas
- constituency for the Parliament of Kenya
- Eldas Constituency within Wajir County

- Wajir County within Kenya
- County: Wajir
- Population: 89,104
- Area: 4,492 km^{2} (1,734.4 sq mi)

Current constituency
- Number of members: 1
- Party: ODM
- Member of Parliament: Adan Keynan Wehliye
- Wards: 4

Eldas is a constituency in Kenya. It is one of the constituencies in Wajir County. It was created during the 2013 general election.

== History ==
The constituency was formed during the 2013 Kenya general election. The current member of parliament has served as the member of parliament since 2013 and has faced serious contention from Hon. Ahmed Boray who has petitioned the election result twice in 2017 and 2022 elections. During the 2022 Kenyan general election, the constituency returning officer was hospitalised after being shot in the leg. The Constituency has 23,359 registered voters as of 2022.

== MPs ==
Elections	MP	Party
2013	Adan Keynan Wehliye	ODM
2017	Adan Keynan Wehliye	JP
2022	Adan Keynan Wehliye	ODM
