= Dan Muzee =

Kenyan politician

Daniel Kazungu Muzee (born 1970 in Kavilani, Marikano Lower Malindi) is a Kenyan politician and Cabinet Secretary in the Ministry of Mining. He was a member of the 11th national assembly of Kenya elected from Malindi Constituency, Kilifi County on the ticket of the Orange Democratic Movement (ODM) in 2013. He failed his reelection to the national assembly in 2017.

== Education and career ==
Dan Muzee was born in 1970 in Kavilani in Marikano Lower Malindi in Kilifi County. He started his early education at Marikano Primary School and studied up to grade 3 before he transferred to Lango Baya Primary School where he earned his first school leaving certificate. He had his secondary education at Kwale High School and studied for a bachelor's degree and master's degree in Information Science at Moi University. After graduation, he worked at the Institute of Advanced Technology as a training consultant for a year before moving to Computec where he was deployed to a United Nations agency. He later joined Fintec International where he was sales representative of Microsoft and Compaq across East Africa region before switching to IBM in New York where he was in charge of Personal Computing Division in East Africa. From IBM he moved to Lenovo Corporation East Africa as regional manager before returning to IBM where he finally served as country representative for Ethiopia and Kenya.

He started his political career in 2010 and campaigned door to door until 2013 when he ran and won Malindi parliamentary seat in the Kenya National Assembly on the ticket of the Orange Democratic Party. In the house, he served on the committees on Departmental Committee on Energy, Communications and Information and was a member of parliamentary committee on regional integration. In 2015, President Uhuru Kenyatta appointed him to the cabinet despite being an active member of the ODM replacing Najib Balala as cabinet secretary, Ministry of Mining. He is the first cabinet minister from Malindi region since independence.

In January 2018, during a government restructuring by President Uhuru Kenyatta, Dan Kazungu was nominated as the High Commissioner representing Kenya in the United Republic of Tanzania. This nomination marked the end of his tenure as a Cabinet Secretary in the Ministry of Mining. As an ambassador, he played a key role in enhancing the relations between the two neighbouring countries, in a period that had the countries' relations threatened by issues such as trade bans and border closures. His diplomatic efforts won him accolades from the then President of Tanzania, The Late John Magufuli. He served as the High Commissioner to Tanzania until 2022.

Since March 2022, Dan Kazungu actively serves as a Non-executive Director and the regional consultant for Caracal Gold PLC. His role aims at advising the mining company on its business activities in East and Central Africa. The company owns the Kilimapesa gold mine in Kenya.
