= Adan Keynan Wehliye =

Kenyan politician

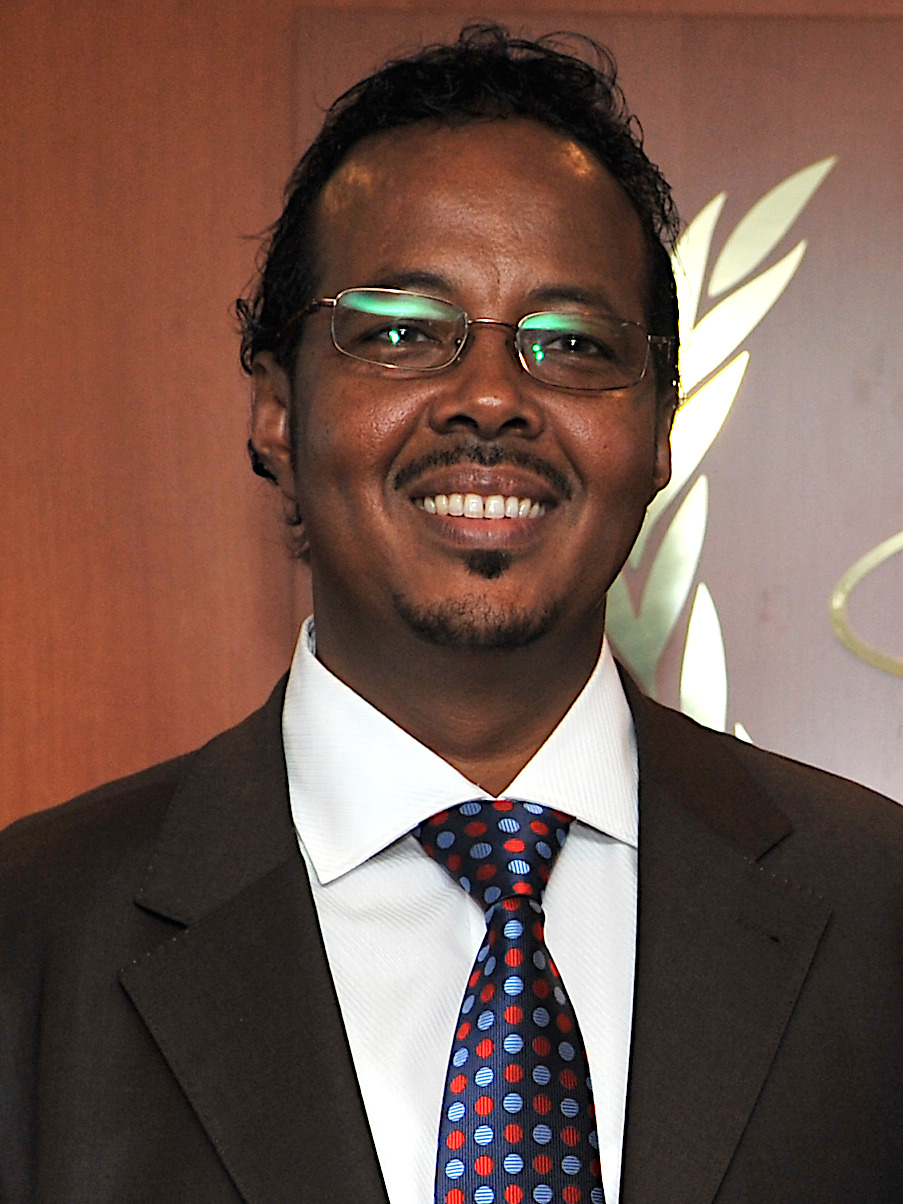
Adan Kenyan Wehiye

Aden Keynan Wehliye is a Member of the National Assembly of Kenya. He served Wajir West constituency from 1997 to 2002 and 2007 to 2013. He then moved to Eldas constituency which was carved from Wajir West. Keynan served as the MP of Eldas in the 11th and 12th parliaments. He represented the Orange Democratic Movement until 2017 when he switched to the Jubilee Party. Keynan was re-elected on the Jubilee ticket in the 2022 elections. He is the longest-serving MP of the 13th Parliament of Kenya.

Keynan received a bachelor's degree and a master's degree at Moi University and Kenyatta University, respectively. He was awarded an Honorary Doctorate in Public Administration (honoris causa) by the Commonwealth University in collaboration with the London Graduate School.

Before joining politics Keynan was a Director at the National Housing Corporation between 1996 and 1997. In 2011, he formed a foundation, the Adan Keynan Foundation, to help afforestation, education and youth and women empowerment in Wajir County. He hails from the Degodia clan of the greater Saransor clan.

== Politics ==
He was first elected into parliament in 1997, as an MP for the then Wajir West parliamentary seat. He has held a seat on the Parliamentary Service Commission (PSC) for three parliamentary terms, serving as its Vice Chairman between 2011 and 2012.

He was Chairman of the Defence and Foreign Relations Committee during the Tenth Parliament. In the Eleventh Parliament he chaired the Public Investment Committee where he also investigated and audited state expenditure including at the defunct Kenya Petroleum Refineries Limited. He has also been a member of the House Business Committee of the Kenyan Parliament, and served in the Finance and Planning and Trade Committee and the Administration, National Security and Local Government Committees between 1998 and 2002.

Keynan is a member of the Parliamentary Network on the World Bank and International Monetary Fund, Parliamentarians for Global Action and Parliamentarians Against Corruption, and an Executive Committee member of the Commonwealth Association of Public Accounts Committees. He is also a former member of the Kenya National Audit Commission.

Keynan is known as "kingmaker" of Wajir politics. In 2013, the relatively inexperienced politician Ahmed Abdullahi was encouraged by Keynan to challenge Mohamed Abdi Mohamud as Wajir Governor, and won the election. In the 2017 general election Keynan led all elected leaders in the Jubilee Party and offered his support for Amb Mohamed Abdi Mohamud as governor, which again was successful.

Keynan has received the Spirit of Detroit Award at Michigan State University in 1999 in recognition of his dedication to improvement of quality of life in Kenya. In 1999, he received an award in the Role of Legislatures in Governance, Washington DC, and in 2013 he was awarded the Chief Order of the Burning Economic with the First Class Spear commendation by the President of Kenya, for distinguished service to humanity and Kenya.
