= Isiolo South Constituency =

- Constituency
- Location of Isiolo South Constituency in Isiolo County

Area
  - Total: 9,817 km^{2} (3,790 sq mi)

Population (2009)
  - Total: 43,118
  - Density: 4.392/km^{2} (11.38/sq mi)

Isiolo South Constituency is an electoral constituency in Kenya. It is one of two constituencies of Isiolo County. The constituency has nine wards, all electing councillors to the Isiolo County Council. The constituency was established for the 1966 elections.

== Members of Parliament ==
Elections	MP	Party	Notes
1966	Hassan Wario	KANU	
1969	Adam Wako Bonaya	KANU	One-party system
1974	Mohamed Ibrahim Ahmed	KANU	One-party system
1979	Adam Wako Bonaya	KANU	One-party system
1983	Dida Tullu Jaldessa	KANU	One-party system.
1988	Dida Tullu Jaldessa	KANU	One-party system.
1992	Abdillahi Haji Wako	KANU	
1997	Abdillahi Haji Wako	KANU	
2002	Abdul Ali	KANU	
2007	Abdul Ali	KANU	
2013	Abdullahi Banticha	United Republican Party(URP)	Under the New Constitution
2017	Abdi Koropu Tepo	Kenya Patriots Party (KPP) (Kenya)	
2022	Mohamed Tupi Bidu	JP	
2026	Tubi Mohamed Tubi	United Democratic Alliance (UDA)	

== Locations and wards ==
Locations
Location	Population*
Eldera	246
Eresa Boru	3,604
Garba Tulla	4,368
Garfarsa	3,233
Kinna	6,517
Kulamawe	2,555
Modogashe	3,467
Malka Daka	1,418
Rapsu	106
Sericho	4,260
Total	x
1999 census.

Wards
Ward	Registered Voters
Eresaboru	997
Garbatula	1,889
Garfarsa	1,367
Kinna	2,453
Kula Mawe	1,587
Madogashe	1,320
Malkadaka	509
Rapsu	343
Sericho	1,144
Total	11,609
*September 2005.
