= Julius Kibiwott Melly =

Kenyan politician

Julius Kibiwott Melly is the member of the National Assembly of Kenya for Tinderet Constituency elected in the 2013 general election. He was the principal of Meteitei Boys Secondary School before joining politics. He is the chairman of Education Committee at the National Assembly of Kenya. Currently serving a third term first elected into office in 2013, re-elected in 2017 and 2022 respectively.
