= Joe Mutambu =

Kenyan politician

Joe Musyimi Mutambu is a Kenyan politician and a member of the 11th parliament of Kenya for Mwingi Central Constituency in Kitui County. He was elected to the parliament on the ticket of Wiper Democratic Movement - Kenya (WDM-K) and with support of CORD Coalition in 2013. He served on the house committees on Energy, Communications and Information, and Procedure and House Rules. He is recorded to have spoken 41 times throughout the session of the 11th parliament.

== Controversies ==
In February 2015, at Tana boardroom Mutambu allegedly assaulted and squeezed the genitals of Charles Kyale who was a special advisor to Kitui governor. He was charged in a magistrate court with causing bodily harm. In September same year, the bishop of Helicopter Church, Thomas Wahome, accused Mutambu of threatening him with a gun, assaulting and detaining him in his office for seven hours. Thomas Wahome had gone to Mutambu's office to recover his truck he had rented to transport cement from Donholm to a construction site in Karen, Nairobi after Mutambu failed to return the truck as agreed.
