= Mohamed Shidiye =

Kenyan politician

Mohamed Muktar Shidiye is a Kenyan politician and a member of the 8th and 11th Kenyan parliament for Lagdera Constituency, Garissa County. He was first elected to the 8th national assembly in 1997 on a ticket of Kenya African National Union (KANU) party and served as deputy government chief whip of KANU party in the parliament. He was defeated in the 2002 election by Abdillahi Sheikh Dahir and in 2007 by Farah Maalim whom he had defeated in his first parliamentary election win in 1997. He reclaimed the seat in 2013 on a TNA party ticket with the support of Jubilee Coalition. Prior to election to the parliament, he served as a district officer (DO) for Meru District in the early 1990s.
