= Samburu East Constituency =

Kenyan electoral constituency

Samburu East
- constituency for the Parliament of Kenya
- Samburu East Constituency within Samburu County

- Samburu County within Kenya
- County: Samburu
- Population: 77,994
- Area: 10,016 km^{2} (3,867.2 sq mi)

Current constituency
- Number of members: 1
- Party: KANU
- Member of Parliament: Lentoijoni Jackson Lekumontare
- Wards: 4

Samburu East is an electoral constituency in Kenya. It is one of three constituencies of Samburu County. The constituency was established for the 1966 elections. The constituency has four wards, all electing Members of the County Assembly for the Samburu County Government.

== Members of Parliament ==
Elections	MP	Party	Notes	Clan
1966	John Kanite Lenaiyiarra	KANU	One-party system	Longeli
1969	David N. Lentaya	KANU	One-party system	Lpisikishu
1974	David N. Lentaya	KANU	One-party system	Lpisikishu
1979	Job Moika Kasaine Lalampaa	KANU	One-party system	Lpisikishu
1983	Job Moika Kasaine Lalampaa	KANU	One-party system	Lpisikishu
1988	Job Moika Kasaine Lalampaa	KANU	One-party system	Lpisikishu
1992	Sammy Prisa Leshore	KANU		Longeli
1997	Sammy Prisa Leshore	KANU		Longeli
2002	Sammy Prisa Leshore	KANU		Longeli
2007	Raphael Letimalo	ODM		Lukumae
2013	Raphael Letimalo	TNA		Lukumae
2017	Lekumontare Lentoijoni J.L	KANU		Lmasula

== Wards ==
Wards
Ward	Registered Voters
Lodungokwe	1,867
Nairimirimo	1,212
Ngare Narok	1,432
Ngaroni	967
Ngilai West	1,164
Sere-Olipi	1,317
Wamba	2,979
Waso East	1,925
Waso West	1,458
Total	14,321
*September 2005.
