= Federal Party of Kenya =

Political party in Kenya

The Federal Party of Kenya (FPK) is a political party in Kenya.

== History ==
The FPK nominated 20 National Assembly candidates for the 2007 general elections, receiving 0.2% of the vote and failing to win a seat.

In the 2013 elections the party nominated 56 National Assembly candidates; increasing its vote share to 1.6% and winning three seats; Michael Aringo Onyura in Butula, Peter Safari Shehe in Ganze and Charles Gimose in Hamisi. It also won one seat in the Senate, Ali Abdi Bule in Tana River County.
