= Danson Mungatana =

Kenyan politician

Danson Buya Mungatana MGH is a Kenyan lawyer and a politician, currently the Senator of Tana River County. He is popularly known as "the crocodile eater." He belonged to NARC-Kenya and was elected to represent the Garsen Constituency in the National Assembly of Kenya between 2002 and 2013. He also served as Assistant Minister in different Ministries in Kenya. He won in the 2002 Kenyan general election and 2007 Kenyan parliamentary election. He is currently a member of United Democratic Alliance.

He was born in 1970 to a Pokomo father and a Taita mother who raised him up together with his four brothers and a sister in a strict Christian setting. He mainly grew up in Mombasa. He schooled at Mary Cliff Primary School for pre-school, did his standard one to four at Ronald Ngala Primary School in Mombasa before joining Arap Moi Primary Boarding School in Ngao Tana River District for his standard five to seven.

The transfer to Ngao Primary Boarding School in his village of birth in Tana River district was in keeping with his family tradition. Although his dad was then working in Mombasa; he wanted all his children at a particular age to leave Mombasa and go to complete primary school in their home village and Hon. Mungatana was not to be exempted from this valuable practice.

He held responsible positions throughout primary school first as a class monitor and ended up as a school prefect in class seven.

He was a football player and participated in athletics and represented his school in interschool games. The boarding school taught him discipline, the need to be responsible and independence at an early stage. Throughout his primary school he had an outstanding academic record which was crowned by his exemplary performance in his C.P.E at class seven. Hon. Dr. Danson Mungatana was the former National Secretary General of Narc Kenya. He was the Member of Parliament representing Garsen Constituency in the former Coast Province. He first got elected in 2002 on a Narc ticket and in 2007 on a Narc Kenya ticket.

He was the Branch Chairman of Narc Kenya Garsen Constituency. He was one of the four(4) directly elected MPS on Narc Kenya ticket (Narc Kenya have 27 other MPs elected on PNU (Narc Kenya). The total number of Narc Kenya MPs is 31.

Hon. Dr. Mungatana was the convenor of the first 8 people who used to meet at the Hotel Boulevard to conceive formation of Narc Kenya. He was the founder of Rotational Chairman of Narc Kenya (the Party then had a principle of rotational chairmanship to underscore the idea of One Kenya through a National outlook).

He was appointed to serve as the National Organising Secretary by the then Vice President and Deputy Party Leader H.E. Hon. Dr. Arthur Moody Awori when the Party elections could not be completed to the National Level.

== Education ==
Hon. Mungatana is a former student of Alliance High School. He holds a LLB and an LLM both from the University of Nairobi and a postgraduate diploma from the Kenya School of Law. On 21 November 2025, Mungatana graduated with a Doctor of Philosophy in Leadership and Management, PhD. from The Management University of Africa.

== Other works ==
He served as the Chairman Board of Directors Kenya Ports Authority and is also currently serving as Commissioner COMESA Competition Commission. He is the Sole Proprietor Mungatana Co.Advocates.
