= Nakuru Town West Constituency =

Constituency in Nakuru, Kenya

Nakuru Town West
- Constituency
- Location within Kenya
- Coordinates: 0.2858031°S 36.0264021°E
- Country: Kenya
- County: Nakuru County

Government
  - Member of parliament: Samuel Arama

Nakuru Town West is a constituency in Kenya. It is one of eleven constituencies in Nakuru County that elect a member to the Kenya National Assembly.

== Elections in the 2010s ==
General election 2017: Nakuru Town West
Party	Candidate	Votes	%	±%
Jubilee	Samuel Arama	29,682	41.5	N/A
ODM	Ochoki Andrew Mingate Isoe	25,071	35.0	+0.8
Independent	Joseph Kariko Mwangi	12,766	17.8	N/A
Independent	Erick Otieno Ogada	1,596	2.2	N/A
Independent	Ezekiel Kiprotich Komen	759	1.1	N/A
KANU	Debora Chepngetich Sang	716	1.0	−1.8
Chama Cha Mashinani	Stephen Kipkemoi A Koech	581	0.8	N/A
Amani National Congress	Peter Getare Ndubi	218	0.3	N/A
Forum For Restoration Of Democracy-kenya	Fravian Wairimu Wacira	169	0.0	N/A
Independent	Sospeter Nyakundi Nyanga Tomato	50	0.1	N/A
Majority		4,611	6.4	
Jubilee gain from ODM		Swing		

General election 2013: Nakuru Town West
Party	Candidate	Votes	%
ODM	Samuel Arama	20,255	34.2
The National Alliance	Charles N. Maisiba	17,837	30.1
United Republican Party	Mohamed Suraw Issak	10,540	17.8
Federal Party Of Kenya	Ojwang James Omondi	2,629	4.4
Narc	Joseph Kariko Mwangi	2,352	4
United Democratic Forum Party	Mike Lumbaso Brawan	2,017	3.4
KANU	William Kibowen Towett	1,667	2.8
Kenya National Congress Party Of Kenya	Victor Warutere	815	1.4
Wiper Democratic Movement- Kenya	Sammy Kipkorir seroney	375	0.6
United Democratic Movement	Raphael Kipsoi Arap Korir	315	0.5
Narc-kenya	Laban Kimathi Mukindia	234	0.4
Ford-kenya	Sospeter Tomato	128	0.2
Majority		2,418	4.1
Turnout		59,164	82.5%
