= Loima Constituency =

Electoral constituency of Kenya

Loima
- constituency for the Parliament of Kenya
- Loima Constituency within Turkana County

- Turkana County within Kenya
- County: Turkana
- Population: 107,795
- Area: 9,120 km^{2} (3,521.3 sq mi)

Current constituency
- Number of members: 1
- Party: UDA
- Member of Parliament: Protus Ewesit Akuja
- Wards: 4

Loima is a constituency in Kenya created in 2012. It is one of six constituencies of Turkana County.
