= Garsen Constituency =

Kenyan electoral constituency

Garsen Constituency is an electoral constituency in Kenya. It is one of three constituencies in Tana River County. The constituency has nine wards, all electing ward representatives to the Tana River County Assembly. The constituency was established for the 1988 elections.

== Members of Parliament ==
Elections	MP	Party	Notes
1988	Abdi Shongolo Wakole	KANU	One-party system.
1992	Yuda Komora	KANU	
1997	Molu Galgalo Shambaro	KANU	
2002	Danson Mungatana	NARC	9th Parliament of Kenya
2007	Danson Mungatana	NARC-Kenya	10th Parliament of Kenya
2013	Ibrahim Ahmed Sane	URP	11th Parliament of Kenya
2017	Ali Wario Guyo	WDM-K	12th Parliament of Kenya
2022	Ali Wario Guyo	ODM	13th Parliament of Kenya

== Locations and wards ==
Locations
Location	Population*
Assa	1,430
Bilisa	9,510
Chara	4,751
Galili	9,461
Kilelengwani	3,715
Kipao	4,109
Kipini	7,861
Kone Mansa	2,601
Mwina	5,714
Ndera	8,257
Ngao	8,612
Ozi	1,680
Salama	5,287
Shirikisho	7,197
Wachu-Oda	5,878
Total	x
1999 census.

Wards
Ward	Registered Voters
Assa	1,001
Bilisa	3,800
Garsen Central	3,897
Garsen South	5,497
Kipini East	4,556
Kipini West	2,011
Ndera	2,667
Salama / Mwina	3,270
Shirikisho	1,842
Total	28,541
*September 2005.
