= Voi Constituency =

Kenyan electoral constituency

Voi
- constituency for the Parliament of Kenya
- Voi Constituency within Taita/Taveta County

- Taita-Taveta County within Kenya
- County: Taita–Taveta County
- Population: 111,831
- Area: 7,553 km^{2} (2,916.2 sq mi)

Current constituency
- Number of members: 1
- Party: JP
- Member of Parliament: Abdi Chome
- Wards: 6

Voi Constituency is an electoral constituency in Kenya. It is one of four constituencies in Taita-Taveta County established for the 1966 elections. Its current Member of National Assembly is Khamis Chome Abdi of Wiper party. The constituency has eight wards.

== Members of Parliament ==
Elections	MP	Party	Notes
1966	Woresha K. Mengo	KANU	
1969	Eliud Timothy Mwamunga	KANU	One-party system
1974	Eliud Timothy Mwamunga	KANU	One-party system
1979	Eliud Timothy Mwamunga	KANU	One-party system
1983	Eliud Timothy Mwamunga	KANU	One-party system.
1988	Adiel Mwaganda Kachila	KANU	One-party system
1992	Daniel Douglas Mbela	KANU	
1997	Basil Nguku Mwakiringo	DP	
2002	Boniface Mganga	KANU	
2007	Danson Mwazo Mwakulegwa	ODM	10th Parliament of Kenya
2013	Johnes Mlolwa	ODM	11th Parliament of Kenya
2017	Johnes Mlolwa	ODM	12th Parliament of Kenya
2022	Khamis Chome Abdi	Wiper	13th Parliament of Kenya

== Wards ==
Wards
Ward	Registered Voters	Local Authority
Kaloleni	4,568	Taita-Taveta County
Mbololo / Ngolia	6,780	Taita-Taveta County
Kaloleni	7,189	Taita-Taveta County
Kirutai	2,171	Voi municipality
Voi Central	5,956	Voi municipality
Voi North East	3,331	Voi municipality
Voi South	1,843	Voi municipality
Voi West	2,656	Voi municipality
Total	34,494	
*September 2005.
