= Kajiado East Constituency =

Kajiado East
- constituency
- Country: Kenya
- County: Kajiado County

Government
  - Member of Parliament: Peris Tobiko

Kajiado East is a constituency in Kenya. It is one of the five constituencies in Kajiado County. It is further subdivided into 5 county administrative wards namely Kitengela, Kenyawa-Poka, Imaroro, Kaputei North and Oloosirkon Sholinke Ward.
