= Nassir Nuh Abdi =

Kenyan politician

Nassir Nuh Abdi or Dr. Nuh Nassir Abdi is a Kenyan politician. He belongs to The United Party of Independent Alliance (UPIA) and was elected to represent the Bura Constituency in the National Assembly of Kenya on Orange Democratic Movement-Kenya since the 2007 Kenyan parliamentary election to 2013. He served in the following parliamentary committees:

- departmental committee on Health (vice chairperson)
- select committee on standing orders
- powers and privileges committee
- select committee on constituency fund

Contested in the 2013 Kenyan parliamentary election for Bura Constituency on Wiper Democratic Movement-Kenya and lost with a margin of eleven (11) votes He was elected as the Speaker of the first county assembly of Tana River in March 2013 after the general election Dr. Abdi Nuh was subsequently elected Chairman - Assemblies Forum or the county assemblies forum CAF, a forum for the speakers and members of the 47 county assemblies of the Republic of Kenya in April of the same year.

He holds a Bachelor of Veterinary medicine (BVM) from the University of Nairobi.
