= Bura Constituency =

Kenyan electoral constituency

Bura Constituency is an electoral constituency in Kenya and was established for the 1997 elections. It is one of three constituencies in Tana River County. The constituency has 5 wards, all electing ward representatives to the Tana River County Assembly.

== Members of Parliament ==
Elections	MP	Party	Notes
1997	Mohamed Abdi Galgallo	KANU	
2002	Ali Wario	KANU	
2007	Nassir Nuh Abdi	ODM-Kenya	
2013	Ali Wario	TNA	11th Parliament of Kenya
2017	Ali Wario	JUBILEE	12th Parliament of Kenya
2022	Yakub Dubow Kuno	UPIA	13th Parliament of Kenya

== Locations and wards ==
Locations
Location	Population*
Bangale	4,706
Bura	14,121
Buwa	3,848
Chewele	6,108
Hirimani	4,816
Kamagur	7,531
Madogo	9,194
Mbalambala	2,759
Mororo	6,675
Nanighi	11,555
Saka	7,814
Sala	3,887
Total	x
1999 census.

Wards
Ward	Registered Voters
Bangale	2,288
Chewele / Bura	6,302
Hirimani	1,495
Kamaguru	921
Madogo South	4,932
Mbalambala	1,200
Nanighi	2,066
Saka	1,078
Sala	976
Total	21,258
*September 2005.
