= Dadaab Constituency =

Electoral constituency of Kenya

Dadaab
- constituency for the Parliament of Kenya
- Dadaab Constituency within Garissa County

- Garissa County within Kenya
- County: Garissa
- Population: 185,252
- Area: 6,415 km^{2} (2,476.8 sq mi)

Current constituency
- Number of members: 1
- Party: Wiper
- Member of Parliament: Farah Maalim
- Wards: 6

Dadaab is a constituency in Kenya. It is one of six constituencies in Garissa County. The current MP, elected in the 2022 elections is Farah Maalim taking over from Hon. Mohamed Dahiye Ali the former member of parliament.

Elections	MP	Party	Notes
2013	Mohamed Dahiye Ali	WDM	
2017	Mohamed Dahiye Ali	JP	
2022	Farah Maalim	WDM	
