= Peter Safari Shehe =

Kenyan politician

Peter Safari Shehe (born 15 December 1955 in Ganze District, Kilifi County) is a Kenyan politician and a member of the 11th parliament elected in 2013 from Kilifi County on the ticket of Federal Party of Kenya. He lost his reelection to the national assembly in 2017 and then contested for a lower political position in Jaribuni ward in 2022.

== Education and career ==
Peter Shehe originates from Kauma in Mijikenda. He had his early education at the Catholic Intermediate School. From 1977, he worked at Kenya Cashew Nuts Company based in Kilifi until 1989, when he left Kenya for Switzerland where he studied commercial business at Migros Klubschule graduating in 1996. In Switzerland, he worked at Migros Retail Company before transferring to Unique Airport Zurich until 2001 when he established his own company – Shehe Cleaning Company.

Shehe returned to Kenya and joined politics. He won the Kilifi County seat in the Kenyan national assembly on the ticket of Federal Party of Kenya. He was defeated in his reelection bid in 2017 by Teddy Mwambire. Shehe challenged the result of the election in court but his case was dismissed and a cost of litigation of 2.5 million Kenyan Shilling was awarded against him. In 2022, he downgraded himself to local politics and contested and won a seat in the Jaribuni Ward.
