= Results of the 2007 Kenyan general election =

This article contains detailed results of the parliamentary election that was held as part of the Kenyan general election in December 2007. Those elected sat in the 10th Parliament of Kenya.

== Results ==
=== Summary ===
207 members of parliament were elected. Elections have to be repeated in 3 constituencies. 12 additional mps will be nominated by the president which is expected to be done according to the strength of parties in the house.

- PNU and affiliated parties held 78 seats (PNU 43, KANU 16, other affiliated parties 21).
- ODM and its affiliated party NARC held 102 seats (ODM itself 99).
- ODM-K held 16 seats.
- 11 candidates reached parliament who were elected under small parties which had so far not yet declared an affiliation to any of the blocks.

Kenyan press reported that 30 mps of small parties formed "Small Parties Parliamentary Group" which would include some members who are counted above as affiliated to PNU.

	ODM	ODM-affiliated NARC	PNU	PNU-affiliated	KANU PNU-affiliated	ODM-Kenya	Independents	TOTAL
MPs	99	3	43	21	14	16	11	207(of 210)
ODM-affiliated party is NARC; PNU-affiliated Parties are KANU (14), Sisi Kwa Sisi (2), Safina (5), NARC-Kenya (4), FORD-Kenya (1), Ford-People (3), New Ford-K (2), Mazingira Party (1), Ford-Asili (1), DP (2); Independents: candidates ran for unaffiliated parties like PDP (1), PPK (1), NLP (1), KADDU (1), UDM (1), PICK (1), CCU (1), Kenda (1) Nation 31-12-2007(Source) Nation 09-01-2008

== Nairobi Province ==
ODM: 5, PNU: 2 (plus one repeat election)

Constituency	Party	Elected
Dagoretti	PNU	Beth Mugo
Embakasi	ODM	Mugabe Were
Kasarani	ODM	Elizabeth Ongoro
Langata	ODM	Raila Odinga
Makadara	PNU	Dickson Wathika
Starehe	ODM	Margaret Wanjiru
Westlands	ODM	Fred Gumo
Kamukunji	PNU	Simon Mbugua (Results were not declared until August 2008 due to a court case).

== Central Province ==
PNU: 18, Safina: 3, KANU: 2, Sisi kwa sisi: 2, FORD-A: 1, FORD-P: 1, PICK: 1 PPK

Constituency	Party	Elected
Gatanga	PNU	Peter Kenneth
Gatundu North	PICK	Clement Kungu Waibara
Gatundu South	KANU	Uhuru Kenyatta
Gichugu	PNU	Martha Karua
Githunguri	SAFINA	Peter Njoroge Baiya
Juja	PNU	George Thuo
Kandara	PNU	James Maina Kamau
Kangema	PNU	John Michuki
Kiambaa	KANU	Stanley Munga Githunguri
Kieni	PNU	Namesyus Warugongo
Kigumo	PNU	Jamleck Irungu Kamau
Kiharu	SISI KWA SISI	Barnabas Muturi Mwangi
Kikuyu	PNU	Lewis Nguyai Nganga
Kinangop	SISI KWA SISI	David Mwaniki Ngugi
Kipipiri	PNU	Amos Kimunya
Kirinyaga Central	FORD A	John Ngata Kariuki
Lari	PPK	David Njuguna Kiburi Mwaura
Limuru	FORD P	Peter Mungai Mwathi
Maragwa	PNU	Peter Mbau Elias
Mathioya	PNU	Clement Muchiri Wambugu
Mathira	SAFINA	Ephraim Mwangi Maina
Mukurweini	SAFINA	Kabando wa Kabando
Mwea	PNU	Peter Njuguna Gitau
Ndaragwa	PNU	Jeremiah Ngayu Kioni
Ndia	PNU	Robinson Njeru Githae
Nyeri Town	PNU	Esther Murugi Mathenge
Ol Kalou	PNU	Erastus Kihara Mureithi
Othaya	PNU	Mwai Kibaki
Tetu	PNU	Francis Thombe Nyamo

== Eastern Province ==
ODM-K: 14, PNU: 7, KANU: 4, CCU: 2, NARC: 2, ODM: 2, DP: 1, NARC KENYA: 1, PICK: 1, SAFINA: 1, Mazingira: 1

Constituency	Party	Elected
Central Imenti	CCU	Gitobu Imanyaara
Gachoka	PNU	Mutava Musyimi
Igembe North	PNU	Ntoitha M'mithiaru
Igembe South	KANU	Franklin Linturi
Isiolo North	NARC KENYA	Mohammed Kuti
Isiolo South	KANU	Abdul Ali
Kaiti	ODM K	Gideon Ndambuki
Kangundo	ODM K	Johnson Nduya Muthama
Kathiani	CCU	Ndeti Wavinya
Kibwezi	ODM K	Philip Kaloki
Kilome	PICK	John Harun Mwau
Kitui Central	NARC	Charity Ngilu
Kitui South	ODM K	Issac Mulatya Muoki
Kitui West	NARC	Charles Mutisya Nyamai
Laisamis	KANU	Joseph Lekuton
Machakos Town	ODM K	Victor Munyaka
Makueni	ODM K	Peter Kiilu
Manyatta	DP	Emillio Kathuli
Masinga	ODM K	Benson Mbai Itwiku
Mbooni	ODM K	Mutula Kilonzo
Moyale	ODM	Ali Mohamud Mohamed
Mutito	ODM K	Julius Kiema Kilonzo
Mwala	ODM K	Daniel Muoki
Mwingi North	ODM K	Kalonzo Musyoka
Mwingi South	ODM K	David Musila
Nithi	KANU	Mbiuki Japhet Kareke
North Horr	ODM	Francis Chachu
North Imenti	Mazingira	Silas Muriuki
Runyenjes	PNU	Cecily Mutitu Mbarire
Saku	ODM K	Sasura Hussein Tarry
Siakago	SAFINA	Kivuti Maxwell
South Imenti	PNU	Kiraitu Murungi
Tharaka	PNU	Alex Muthengi Mwiru
Tigania East	PNU	Peter Munya
Tigania West	PNU	Mwiria Valerian Kilemi
Yatta	ODM K	Mutavi Charles Kilonzo

== Western Province ==
ODM: 18, PNU: 2, New Ford-K: 2, FORD K: 1, KADDU: 1

Constituency	Party	Elected
Amagoro	ODM	Ojaamongson Sospeter Odeke
Budalangi	ODM	Pius Tawfiq Namwamba Ababu
Bumula	PNU	Sylvester Wakoli Bifwoli
Butere	ODM	Wycliffe Oparanya
Butula	ODM	Bwire Alfred Odhiambo
Emuhaya	ODM	Kenneth Marende
Funyula	ODM	Otuoma Paul Nyogesa
Hamisi	ODM	George Haniri
Ikolomani	NEW FORD KENYA	Bonny Khalwale
Kanduyi	ODM	Alfred Khang'ati
Khwisero	ODM	Evans Akula
Kimilili	FORD K	David Eseli Simiyu
Lugari	KADDU	Cyrus Jirongo
Lurambi	ODM	Atanas Keya
Malava	NEW FORD KENYA	Soita Shitanda
Matungu	ODM	David Were
Mt Elgon	ODM	Fred Kapondi
Mumias	ODM	Benjamin Jomo Washiali
Nambale	ODM	Chrysanthus Okemo
Sabatia	ODM	Musalia Mudavadi
Shinyalu	ODM	Charles Lirechi
Sirisia	PNU	Moses Wetangula
Vihiga	ODM	Yusuf Kifuma Chanzu
Webuye	ODM	Alfred Sambu

== Nyanza Province ==
ODM: 25, KANU: 2, NARC: 1, NLP: 1, DP: 1, FORD_P: 1, PDP: 1

Constituency	Party	Elected
Alego	ODM	Edwin Ochieng Yinda
Bobasi	ODM	Christopher Mogere Obure
Bomachoge	FORD P	Joel Onyancha
Bonchari	ODM	Charles Onyancha
Bondo	ODM	Oburu Odinga
Gem	ODM	Washington Jakoyo Midiwo
Gwassi	ODM	Mbadi John Ng'ongo
Karachuonyo	ODM	James Kwanya Rege
Kasipul Kabondo	ODM	Joseph Oyugi Magwanga
Kisumu Rural	ODM	Peter Anyang' Nyong'o
Kisumu Town East	ODM	Ahmed Shakeel Shabbir Ahmed
Kisumu Town West	ODM	John Olago Aluoch
Kitutu Chache	PDP	Richard Momoima
Kitutu Masaba	NLP	Walter Enock Nyambati Osebe
Kuria	DP	Wilfred Gisuka Machage
Mbita	ODM	Gerald Otieno Kajwang
Migori	ODM	John Pesa Dache
Muhoroni	ODM	Patrick Ayiecho Olweny
Ndhiwa	ODM	Joshua Orwa Ojodeh
North Mugirango Borabu	KANU	Moriasi Wilfred Ombui
Nyakach	ODM	Pollyins Ochieng Anyango
Nyando	ODM	Frederick Outa Otieno
Nyaribari Chache	NARC	Robert Onsare Monda
Nyaribari Masaba	KANU	Samson Kagengo Ongeri
Nyatike	ODM	Peter Edick Omondi Anyanga
Rangwe	ODM	Martin Otieno Ogindo
Rarieda	ODM	Nicholas Gumbo
Rongo	ODM	Dalmas Anyango Otieno
South Mugirango	ODM	James Omingo Magara
Ugenya	ODM	James Orengo
Uriri	ODM	Cyprian Ojwang Omollo
West Mugirango	ODM	James Ondicho Gesami

== Coast Province ==
ODM: 12, PNU: 3, NARC-K: 2, ODM-K: 1, FORD-P: 1, KADU ASILI: 1, KANU: 1

Constituency	Party	Elected
Bahari	ODM	Benedict Fodo Gunda
Bura	ODM K	Nassir Nuh Abdi
Changamwe	ODM	Ramadhan Seif Kajembe
Galole	ODM	Godhana Dhadho Gaddae
Ganze	KADU ASILI	Francis Bayah
Garsen	NARC KENYA	Danson Mungatana
Kaloleni	PNU	Samwel Kazungu Kambi
Kinango	FORD P	Samuel Gonzi Rai
Kisauni	ODM	Hassan Ali Joho
Lamu East	PNU	Abu Mohamed Abuchiaba
Lamu West	NARC KENYA	Fahim Yasin Twaha
Likoni	ODM	Mwalimu Masudi Mwahima
Magarini	ODM	Amason Kingi Jeffah
Malindi	ODM	Maitha Gideon Mung'aro
Matuga	PNU	Chirau Ali Mwakwere
Msambweni	ODM	Omar Mbwana Zonga
Mvita	ODM	Najib Balala
Mwatate	ODM	Calist Andrew Mwatela
Taveta	KANU	Naomi Namisi Shaban
Voi	ODM	Danson Mwazo Mwakulegwa
Wundanyi	ODM	Thomas Ludindi Mwadeghu

== Rift Valley Province ==
ODM: 32, PNU: 11, Kanu: 1, Kenda: 1, NARC-K: 1, UDM: 1

Constituency	Party	Elected
Ainamoi	ODM	David Kimutai Too
Aldai	ODM	Sally Kosgey
Baringo Central	ODM	Sammy Mwaita
Baringo East	PNU	Kamama Asman Abongutum
Baringo North	ODM	William Kipkorir
Belgut	ODM	Charles Cheruiyot Keter
Bomet	ODM	Kipkalya Kones
Bureti	ODM	Franklin Bett
Chepalungu	ODM	Isaac Ruto
Cherangani	ODM	Joshua Kutuny
Eldama Ravine	ODM	Moses Lessonet
Eldoret East	ODM	Kamar Margret Jepkoech
Eldoret North	ODM	William Ruto
Eldoret South	ODM	Peris Chepchumba
Emgwen	ODM	Elijah Lagat
Kacheliba	ODM K	Samuel Poghisio
Kajiado Central	ODM	Joseph Ole Nkaissery
Kajiado North	PNU	George Saitoti
Kapenguria	ODM	Julius Mugor
Keiyo North	ODM	Chepkitony Lucas Kipkosei
Keiyo South	ODM	Kiptanui Kiplagat Jackson
Kipkelion	ODM	Kiprono Langat
Konoin	ODM	Julius Kipyegon Kones
Kuresoi	ODM	Zakayo Cheroiyot
Kwanza	PNU	Noah Wakesa
Laikipia East	PNU	Kiunjuri Festus Mwangi
Laikipia West	PNU	Muriithi Ndiritu
Loitoktok	NARC KENYA	Katoo Ole Metito
Marakwet East	KENDA	Linah Kilimo
Marakwet West	ODM	Kaino Boaz Kipchuma
Mogotio	UDM	Hellen Sambili
Molo	PNU	Joseph Nganga Kiuna
Mosop	ODM	David Koech
Naivasha	KANU	John Michael Njenga Mututho
Nakuru Town	PNU	Lee Maiyani Kinyanjui
Narok North	ODM	William Ronkorua Ntimama
Narok South	ODM	Nkoidilla Lankas
Rongai	ODM	Kigen Luka Kipkorir
Saboti	PNU	Eugene Ludovic Wamalwa
Samburu East	ODM	Raphael Lentimalo
Samburu West	ODM	Simon Lesirma
Sigor	ODM	Wilson Litole
Sotik	ODM	Lorna Laboso
Subukia	PNU	Nelson Gaichuhie
Tinderet	ODM	Henry Kiprono Kosgey
Turkana Central	PNU	David Ethuro
Turkana North	PNU	John Munyes
Turkana South	ODM	Josephat Koli Nanok

== North Eastern ==
Kanu: 4, ODM: 5; Safina: 1

Constituency	Party	Elected
Dujis	ODM	Aden Bare Duale
Fafi	KANU	Aden Ahamed Sugow
Ijara	KANU	Mohamed Yussuf Haji
Lagdera	ODM	Farah Maalim
Mandera Central	SAFINA	Abdikadir Hussein Mohamed
Mandera East	ODM	Mohamed Hussein Ali
Mandera West	ODM	Maalim Mahmud Mohamed
Wajir East	ODM	Mohamed Ibrahim Elmi
Wajir South	KANU	Abdirahman Ali Hassan
Wajir West	KANU	Adan Keynan Wehiye

== See also ==
- 2007 in Kenya
- 2007 Kenyan general election
- National Assembly of Kenya
- Political parties in Kenya
