= John Okumu =

Kenyan physicist and academic administrator

Professor John Okumu

Vice-Chancellor of Kenyatta University
- Incumbent
- Assumed office 27 July 2026
- Preceded by: Paul Wainaina

Personal details
- Occupation: Academic
- Profession: Physicist
- Known for: Vice-Chancellor of Kenyatta University

Professor John Okumu is a Kenyan physicist and academic administrator who serves as the seventh Vice-Chancellor of Kenyatta University. He was appointed the substantive Vice-Chancellor on 27 July 2026 following a recruitment process conducted by the Public Service Commission.

== Education ==
He joined Kenyatta University as a Tutorial Fellow in 1988. He later obtained a Doctor of Philosophy (PhD) in Condensed Matter Physics from the University of Leeds in the United Kingdom.

== Career ==
Okumu began his academic career at Kenyatta University in 1988 as a Tutorial Fellow. He was promoted to Lecturer in 1992, Senior Lecturer in 1999, Associate Professor in 2004, and Full Professor in 2020.

He served as Deputy Vice-Chancellor (Academic Affairs) for ten years, overseeing academic programmes, quality assurance and research administration.

In January 2026, Okumu was appointed Acting Vice-Chancellor following the completion of Professor Paul Wainaina's term.

On 27 July 2026, he was appointed the substantive Vice-Chancellor after emerging as the top candidate in a recruitment process conducted by the Public Service Commission.

== Research ==
Okumu has published scholarly articles in physics and supervised postgraduate research.

== See also ==
- Kenyatta University
