= 2013 Meru local elections =

Elections in Meru, Kenya

Local elections were held in Meru County to elect a Governor and County Assembly on 4 March 2013. Under the new constitution, which was passed in a 2010 referendum, the 2013 general elections were the first in which Governors and members of the County Assemblies for the newly created counties were elected. They will also be the first general elections run by the Independent Electoral and Boundaries Commission(IEBC) which has released the official list of candidates.

== Gubernatorial election ==
Candidate	Running Mate	Coalition	Party	Votes
Gichunge, Hezekiah	Kuura, Stanley Kithagacha		Kenya National Congress	--
Maore, Jasto Mati	Gikunda, Erick Mwenda	Cord	Orange Democratic Movement	--
Marambii, Reuben Mbaine	Mung'athia, Stanley		United Democratic Forum Party	--
Munya, Peter Gatirau	Muriungi, Raphael		Alliance Party of Kenya	--
Mwiria, Kilemi	Imaana, Eliud Nkunja	Jubilee	The National Alliance	--

== Prospective candidates ==
The following are some of the candidates who have made public their intentions to run:

- Kilemi Mwiria - Assistant Minister
- Peter Munya - Assistant Minister
- Reuben Marambii - Former CEO of National Bank of Kenya
- Hezekiah Gichunge - University Lecturer
- Jasto Maore
