= Korir =

Korir may refer to:

- Korir (surname)
- Korir, Iran, a village in Mazandaran Province

== See also ==
- Kipkorir, related surname meaning a boy born towards morning
- Jepkorir, related surname meaning a girl born around 0630hrs
