= Alego =

Alego may refer to:

- South East Alego electoral ward of Siaya County Council, Kenya
- Alego Constituency (Alego Usonga Constituency), one of the Constituencies of Kenya
- South East Alego, an administrative location in Karemo division of Siaya County
