= Holy Redeemer Church, Bray =

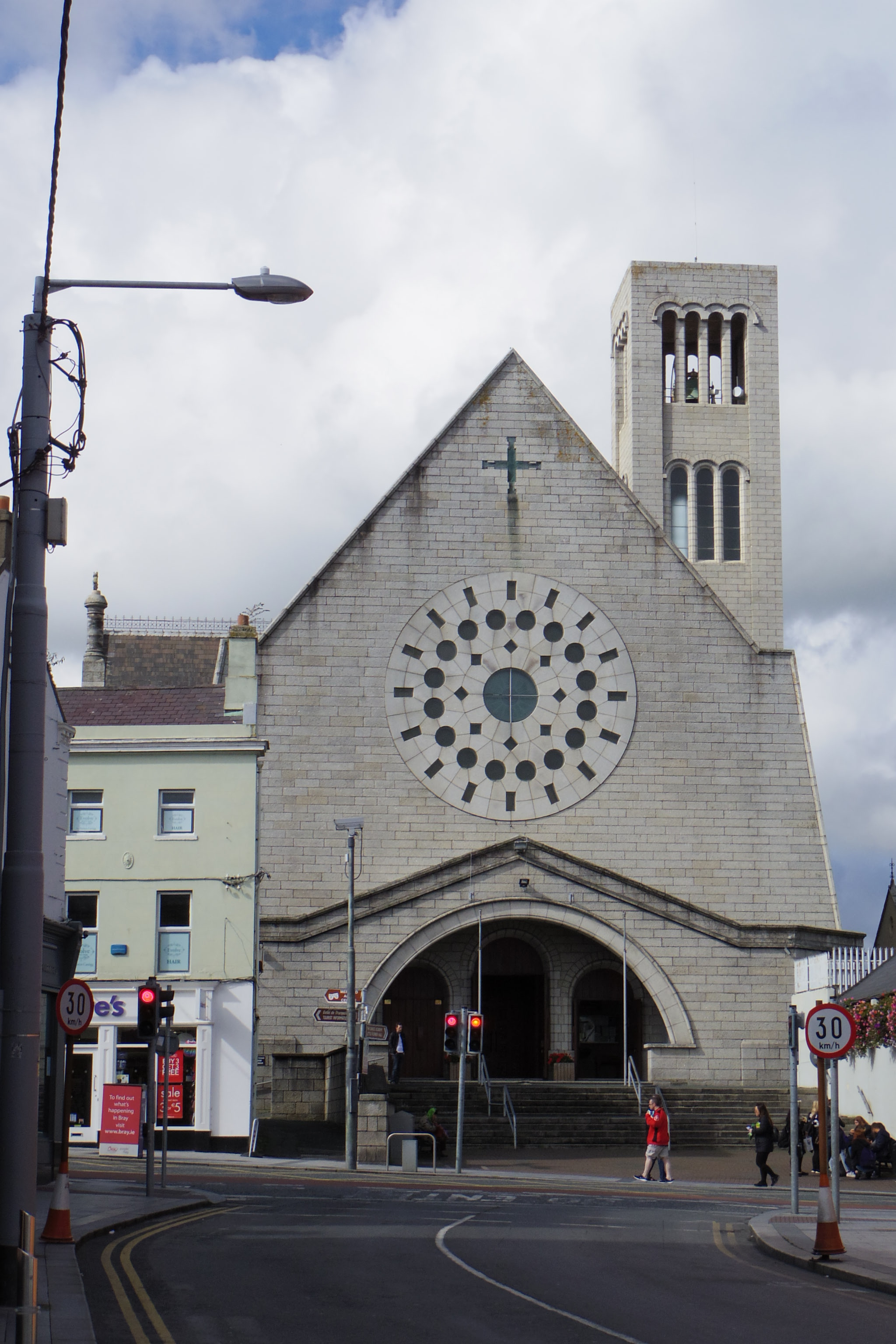
- Holy Redeemer Church, Bray
- Holy Redeemer Church, Bray
- 53°12′12″N 6°6′36″W
- Location: Bray (County Wicklow)
- Country: Ireland
- Denomination: Roman Catholic
- Website: holyredeemerbray.ie

Architecture
- Years built: 1895-1897 (original works); 1965 (reconstruction)

Administration
- Diocese: Dublin

The Church of the Holy Redeemer is a Catholic church situated on the Main Street in Bray, County Wicklow, Ireland. It is included in the Record of Protected Structures maintained by Wicklow County Council.

The church building dates largely from the late 1890s with the modernist front, porch, side projections and tower added during a reconstruction in 1965. A youth centre was completed behind the church in 2008 and is accessed via Herbert Road.

The parish has a connection with Saint Cronan's Boys' National School amongst other local primary and secondary schools. The parish is twinned with the parish of Ikanga in Kenya.

The parish hall of the church is known as the "Little Flower Hall". It was the home of Bray Male School between 1880 and 1931.
