= Willy Komen =

Willy Komen is the name of:

- Willy Komen (athlete), Kenyan runner
- Willy Komen (politician), Kenyan politician
