= Korir (surname) =

Korir is a surname. Notable people with the surname include:

- Albert Korir (born 1994), Kenyan long-distance runner
- Emmanuel Korir (born 1995), Kenyan middle-distance runner
- Japhet Korir (born 1993), Kenyan long-distance runner
- John Cheruiyot Korir (born 1981), Kenyan middle and long-distance runner
- John Korir Kipsang (born 1975), Kenyan middle and long-distance runner
- Judith Korir (born 1995), Kenyan long-distance runner
- Julius Korir (born 1960), Kenyan middle and long-distance runner
- Julius M. Korir (born 1963), Kenyan long-distance runner
- Mark Korir (born 1985), Kenyan long-distance runner
- Sammy Korir (born 1971), Kenyan middle and long-distance runner
- Paul Korir (born 1977), Kenyan middle and long-distance runner
- Shedrack Kibet Korir (born 1978), Kenyan middle and long-distance runner
- Wesley Korir (born 1982), Kenyan long-distance runner and politician

== See also ==
- Kipkorir, related surname meaning a boy born towards morning
- Jepkorir, related surname meaning a girl born around 6:30am
