= Kiptoo =

Kiptoo is a given name and surname of Kenyan, kalenjin origin meaning either born when visitors arrive or during visitation, or son of "Too". that may refer to:

- Albert Kiptoo Yator (1993–2011), Kenyan steeplechase runner
- Benjamin Kiptoo (born 1979), Kenyan marathon runner and 2011 Paris Marathon winner
- Edwin Kiptoo (born 1993), Kenyan long-distance runner
- Mark Kiptoo (born 1976), Kenyan long-distance track runner and 2012 African champion
- Philip Kiptoo Tunoi, Kenyan lawyer and Supreme Court justice
- Robert Kiptoo Kipkorir, Kenyan politician and Member of the National Assembly
- Jane Kiptoo (born 1982), Kenyan female marathon runner
