= Akula =

Akula may refer to:

== People ==
=== Stage name ===
- Oksana Pochepa (born 1984), stage name Akula, Russian pop singer and model

=== Given name ===
- Akula Lalitha, Indian politician
- Akula Rajender, Indian politician belonging to Indian National Congress
- Akula Satyanarayana, member of the Bharatiya Janata Party from Andhra Pradesh

=== Surname ===
- Evans Akula, Kenyan politician
- Kastuś Akuła, Belarusian writer
- Soniya Akula, Indian actress
- Sreeja Akula, Indian table tennis player
- Vikram Akula, Indian-American entrepreneur and banker

== Related to Russia ==
- Russian for shark, a type of predatory fish
- Akula-class submarine, Щука-Б or Shchuka-B in Russian
- Typhoon-class submarine, Акула or Akula in Russian
- Russian submarine Akula (1908), a submarine built for the Imperial Russian Navy

== Other uses ==
- Akula Island, island in the Wilhelm Archipelago, Antarctica
- Kaula in Kashmir Shaivism
