= Koroshi =

Koroshi can refer to:

- Koroshi language, a language of Iran
- "Koroshi" (Danger Man), a 1968 episode of the TV series Danger Man, later released as a feature film
- Koroshi, or Film Noir, a 2000 film by Masahiro Kobayashi

== See also ==
- Kőrösi, a Hungarian surname
