= Nicholas Kipkorir =

Nicholas Kipkorir may refer to:

- Nicholas Chelimo Kipkorir (born 1983), Kenyan marathon runner
- Nicholas Kipkorir Kimeli (born 1998), Kenyan distance track runner

== See also ==
- Kipkorir
