= Alicen Chelaite =

Kenyan politician

Assistant Minister of Gender, Sports, Culture and Social Services
- In office 2003–2007

Member of the National Assembly of Kenya for Rongai Constituency
- In office 2002–2007
- Preceded by: Eric Toroitich Morogo
- Succeeded by: Luka Kigen

Mayor of Nakuru
- In office 1996–1997

Personal details
- Party: Kenya African National Union; National Rainbow Coalition

Alicen Jematia Ronoh Chelaite (born c. 1945) is a Kenyan politician. In 1996, Chelaite became the first woman elected mayor of the city of Nakuru, serving in that office from 1996 until 1997. Chelaite also served in the National Assembly of Kenya, representing the Rongai Constituency, for one term from 2002 until 2007 and the Assistant Minister of Gender, Sports, Culture and Social Services from 2003 to 2007.

The Star, a national newspaper, described her as "the pioneer of women in political leadership in Nakuru."

== Biography ==
Chelaite moved into the home of Daniel arap Moi and Lena Moi in Kabarnet when she was 13-years old to help take care of their two eldest children, Jonathan and Jenifer. She lived and worked at the Moi household from 1954 until 1955. Chelaite has recalled positive experiences living and working for the future president and first lady of Kenya, remembering, "Lena respected me. We even used to share meals together and whenever she bought her children gifts, I would also receive something. The couple treated me like their daughter."

Two years after leaving the Moi house, Chelaite enrolled at Kapropita Girls High School, with Daniel arap Moi paying her tuition. Next, she completed a secretarial courses and began her career as a secretary at a former provincial administration office and Egerton University. There, she worked alongside several prominent local politicians, including her former employer, Daniel arap Moi.

During the late 1970s, Chelaite was working as a secretary ay Egerton University when a delagtion arrived representing Daniel arap Moi. The delegation said that Moi wanted to nominate Chelaite as a Nakuru municipal councilor. In 1987, Chelaite nominated for a seat in the Nakuru municipal council by President Moi, beginning her political career.

Six years later, another local delegation arrived at her office asking her to run for a full seat in the Nukuru Municipality Council. She was elected as a Nakuru Municipality Councilor in 1984, representing Ward 16 (present-day Kwa Rhonda Ward). Though she was now in elected office, Chelaite stated that President Moi was worried she would be threatened by the overwhelmingly male politicians who dominated politics in Nakuru County at the time. Chelaite was also surprised that, as a woman in a region dominated by the Kalenjin people, she had been elected to office, later telling The Star in a 2020 interview, "I was at the peak of my career at 40years of age having worked in both public and private sectors and it had never occurred to me that members of the majorly patriarchal Kalenjin community would ask me to lead them." However, she did suffer from sexist attacks by opponents during the campaigns. The attacks did not work. Alicen Chelaite was consistently re-elected to the Nukuru Municipality Counci, becoming the longest serving member from Kwa Rhonda Ward.

In 1996, Alicen Chelaite became the first woman elected Mayor of Nakuru in the city's history. She served two years in the mayor's office from 1996 to 1997. She then ran for a seat in the National Assembly of Kenya, representing the Rongai Constituency, in the 1997 Kenyan general election, but lost the Kenya African National Union (KANU) party primary election. She has claimed that President Moi favored her male political opponents in these particular elections.

Chelaite once again declared her candidacy for Parliament in the 2002 Kenyan general election and was elected MP from Rongai Constituency as a National Rainbow Coalition (NARC) party member. During her term as MP, Chelaite was appointed as Assistant Minister of Gender, Sports, Culture and Social Services from 2003 until 2007. Though President Moi left office in 2002, Chelaite credited him to with her appointment as assistant minister, "He made sure I became the first ever female assistant minister." During her tenure, Chelaite was rated as the second most effective MP in terms of management of her Constituency Development Fund in the national parliament.

According to Chelaite, President Moi, who was president from 1978 to 2002, would often invite her to his office in the State House, presidential residence to discuss the politics, economics, and social development of Nakuru. She told in the Daily Nation in 2020, "I was living in Mayor's House at Milimani Estate which is in the same neighborhood with State House and I visited Mzee Moi many times."

Alicen Chelaite declined to seek re-election in 2007 and retired from elected politics after one term in parliament. She returned to her home in Nakuru County and focused on farming. She is widely credited with opening new opportunities for other elected female politicians in Nakuru County, including MP Jayne Kihara and Nakuru County Governor Susan Kihika.

She was living in a retirement home in the Ngata area of Rongai, Nakuru County in 2022. In 2025 she was mentioned in a case where three people were charged with attempted fraud. One of them, Edwin Ronoh, was a police officer and it was alleged that he had claimed in 2010 to be Chelaite's son.
