= Kororia =

Kororia is a surname of Kenyan origin that may refer to:

- Kipyego Kororia (born 1971), Kenyan cross country runner and medallist at the 1987 IAAF World Cross Country Championships
- Shem Kororia (born 1972), Kenyan half marathon runner

== See also ==
- Korir (disambiguation), a similar Kenyan name
