= Bernard Njoka Mutani =

NITHI MEMBER OF PARLIAMENT

Bernard Njoka Mutani was the Seventh Member of Parliament for Nithi Constituency in Kenya.

Mutani was elected Nithi parliamentary seats twice, in 1992 and 1997. In 1999, his victory was nullified by the court. Having been barred from participating in the bi-election, Mutani retired from national politics. Mutani died on 24 June 2011.
