= Peter Oloo-Aringo =

Kenyan politician (1941–2024)

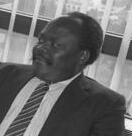
- Oloo-Aringo in 1986

Member of Parliament for Alego Constituency
- In office 1974–1988
- Succeeded by: Otieno Mak’onyango
- In office 1997–2002
- Preceded by: Otieno Mak’onyango
- Succeeded by: Sammy Arthur Weya

Personal details
- Born: May 19, 1941 Alego, Siaya District, Kenya
- Died: November 1, 2024 (aged 83) Kenya
- Party: KANU (until 1991); Opposition (from 1991)
- Education: University of Nairobi; University of Toronto
- Occupation: Politician, Educator
- Known for: Introducing the 8-4-4 education system in Kenya

Peter Oloo-Aringo (19 May 1941 – 1 November 2024) was a Kenyan politician. He previously represented the Alego Constituency in the National Assembly of Kenya in two separate stints between 1974 and 1988 and between 1997 and 2002. Oloo-Aringo is particularly remembered as the only leader who has served in the parliamentary docket for 25 years. He served on the Salaries and Remuneration Commission.

== Early life ==
Oloo-Aringo was born on 19 May 1941 in Alego, Siaya District. He attended St. Mary's School in Yala, Kenya, before completing a degree in history at the University of Nairobi.

After passing his Cambridge School certificate, he was admitted to Siriba College, Maseno where he trained as a teacher between 1961 - 1962.

He was posted to St. Mary’s Yala where he taught between 1963 and 1964, then taught at Kapsabet Secondary School. He was Acting Headmaster of the School for a stint between 1967 and June 1969, he undertook a Bachelor of Arts in Education and obtained a first class Honours.

He taught for four months at Ambira Secondary School, then proceeded to the University of Toronto, Canada where he undertook study in Economics, History, Political Science, Philosophy and Education obtaining a Masters of Arts in 1971.

He lectured on African Politics for a year at the same University.

In 1972, he returned to Kenya and was posted to Aquinas High School before joining Upper Hill School. In 1973 he was appointed Vice Principal of Kenya Polytechnic, from where he resigned in 1974 to contest the Alego Usonga seat in that year’s general elections.

== Political life ==
Aringo won the 1979 General elections and was appointed Assistant Minister for Higher Education. Later, he was elevated to be Minister for Information and Broadcasting.

In March 1982, he was transferred to the Ministry of Environment but was relieved of his job later the same year and was replaced by Dr. William Omamo.

He won the 1984 General elections and in 1985 he was appointed an Assistant Minister under the joint Ministry of Education, Science and Technology. In 1986 he was elevated as a Minister for Education. It was during Aringo’s tenure as Minister for Education that the 8-4-4 system of education was introduced.

After he won the 1988 General Elections, he was appointed Minister for Education, in 1991, he was transferred to the Ministry of Manpower Development but was relieved of his job the same year for his too-obvious pro-opposition sentiments.

After the repeal of section 2A, he defected from Kanu and joined the opposition, consequently, he lost his Kanu National Chairmanship.

In the 1992 general elections, Aringo lost the Alego – Usonga parliamentary seat to journalist Otieno Mak’onyango but made a comeback in 1997 only to lose it again in 2002 to Sammy Arthur Weya.

== Death ==
Oloo Aringo died in November 2024 after suffering a cardiac arrest while receiving treatment.
