= Joseph Maero Oyula =

Kenyan politician

Honourable Joseph Maero Oyula

Member of Parliament
- Incumbent
- Assumed office August 31, 2017
- Preceded by: Michael Aringo Onyura
- Constituency: Butula Constituency

Personal details
- Born: Butula Busia County, Kenya
- Party: ODM; Azimio La Umoja
- Other political affiliations: NASA (before 2022)
- Education: Kenya Methodist University
- Occupation: Politician
- Profession: Entrepreneur

Joseph Maero Oyula is a Kenyan politician currently serving as the Member of Parliament for Butula Constituency. He has held this position since August 31, 2017, representing the area under the Orange Democratic Movement (ODM) party.

== Political background ==
Oyula contested the Butula Constituency parliamentary seat in the 2013 Kenyan general elections. In that election, he secured 10,936 votes, finishing second to Michael Aringo Onyura, who won with 12,325 votes.

In the 2017 general elections, Oyula successfully won the Butula Constituency seat under the (ODM) party. He assumed office on August 31, 2017, becoming the Member of Parliament for Butula Constituency.

Since his election, Oyula has been actively involved in legislative and development initiatives. He is a member of key parliamentary committees, including the Departmental Committee on Finance and National Planning and the National Government Constituencies Development Committee, where he contributes to financial oversight and constituency development.
