= Kieni Constituency =

Kenyan electoral constituency

Kieni Constituency is an electoral constituency in Kenya. It is one of six constituencies in Nyeri County and was established for the 1988 elections.

== Members of Parliament ==
Elections	MP	Party	Notes
1988	Joel Muruthi Muriithi	KANU	One-party system.
1992	David Munene Kairu	Democratic Party	
1997	David Munene Kairu	Democratic Party	Kairu died in 1998, resulting in a by-election
1998	Chris Murungaru	Democratic Party	By-elections
2002	Chris Murungaru	NARC	
2007	Namesyus Warugongo	PNU	
2013	Kanini Kega	TNA	
August 2017	Kanini Kega	JP	
August 2022	Anthony Njoroge Wainaina	UDA	

== Wards ==
Ward	Registered Voters	Local authority
Mwiyogo/Endarasha	12,054	Nyeri county
Gakawa	13,553	Nyeri county
Gatarakwa	11,616	Nyeri county
Mugunda	15,491	Nyeri county
Mweiga	10,816	Nyeri county
Naro Moru/Kiamathaga	17,330	Nyeri county
Thegu River	15,365	Nyeri county
Kabaru	12,776	Nyeri county
Total	109,001	
*September 2005,
