= Galmagala =

Town in Kenya

Galmagala is a town in Garissa County, Kenya.

Galmagala is part of Fafi Constituency for the Parliament of Kenya.
