= Anthony Wainaina =

Kenyan politician

Anthony Njoroge Wainaina MP

Member of the Kenyan Parliament for Kieni
- Incumbent
- Assumed office 8 September 2022
- Preceded by: Kanini Kega

Personal details
- Party: United Democratic Alliance
- Website: Parliamentary website

Anthony Njoroge Wainaina is a Kenyan politician serving as a member of the National Assembly representing Kieni.

== Biography ==
Wainaina graduated from Kenyatta High School in 1978, and became a certified public accountant and In 2012, he earned a bachelors degree in Business administration from Kenya Methodist University.

== 2024 protests ==
A supermarket owned by Wainaina was looted during the 2024 finance bill protests, losing him millions in products and equipment. He was forced to lock himself in the business during the incident. He pleaded for people to return what was stolen, reflecting on his donations of food during the COVID-19 pandemic in Kenya.
