= Tiras Nyingi Ngahu =

Kenyan politician and real estate broker

Tiras Nyingi Ngahu (b. 1965) was a Kenyan politician and real estate broker. He was elected to parliament in a September 2012 by-election to represent Kangema Constituency. He attended Githiga Primary School and Thika High School. He received a B.A Education from Kenyatta University in 1987 and was a director at Prime Movers Insurance Brokers.

Ngahu was born in 1965 in Githiga, Kangema, to Jecinta Wambui and Enos Ngahu. Ngahu died at a Nairobi hospital on 13 February 2022.
