= Keiyo North Constituency =

Kenyan electoral constituency

Keiyo North
- constituency for the Parliament of Kenya
- Keiyo North Constituency within Elgeyo/Marakwet County

- Elgeyo-Marakwet County within Kenya
- County: Elgeyo-Marakwet
- Population: 99,176
- Area: 543 km^{2} (209.7 sq mi)

Current constituency
- Number of members: 1
- Party: UDA
- Member of Parliament: Adams Kipsanai Korir
- Wards: 4

Keiyo North is an electoral constituency in Kenya. It is one of four constituencies of Elgeyo-Marakwet County. The constituency was established for the 1969 elections. It was one of two constituencies of the former Keiyo District.

== Members of Parliament ==
Elections	MP	Party	Notes
1969	Eric K. Cheserek	KANU	One-party system
1974	Vincent Komen arap Too	KANU	One-party system
1979	Vincent Komen arap Too	KANU	One-party system
1983	Robert Kiptoo Kipkorir	KANU	One-party system.
1988	Robert Kiptoo Kipkorir	KANU	One-party system.
1992	Paul Chepkok	KANU	By-elections
1997	Elijah K. Sumbeiywo	KANU	
2002	Lucas Kipkosgei Chepkitony	KANU	
2007	Lucas Kipkosgei Chepkitony	ODM	
2013	James Murgor	URP	
2017	James Murgor	Jubilee Party	
2022	Adams Kipsanai Korir	UDA	

== Locations and wards ==
Locations
Location	Population*
Chebaror	5,508
Irong	18,576
Kamogich	7,967
Kamoi	3,008
Kapchemutwa	7,639
Keu	2,154
Kiptuilong	6,669
Kokwao	5,929
Mutei	11,220
Total	x
1999 census.

Wards
Ward	Registered Voters	Local Authority
Central	3,272	Iten/Tambach town
Irong	2,615	Iten/Tambach town
Kapkonga	1,142	Iten/Tambach town
Kapterik	2,087	Iten/Tambach town
Kessup	2,268	Iten/Tambach town
Sergoit	3,557	Iten/Tambach town
Kamogich	551	Keiyo county
Kapchemutwa	3,246	Keiyo county
Keu	1,162	Keiyo county
Kiptuilong	451	Keiyo county
Kokwao	2,207	Keiyo county
Mutei	4,919	Keiyo county
Total	27,477	
*September 2005.
