= Robert Onsare Monda =

Kenyan politician

Robert Onsare Monda is a Kenyan politician. Monda served as the Member of Parliament for Nyaribari Chache after defeating veteran politician Simeon Nyachae in 2007, but his bid to maintain his seat for the second term was unsuccessful. He lost to ODM's Chris Bichage in 2013. After 10 years out of power, Monda came back to the political scene after he was named as Simba Arati's running mate for the Kisii County gubernatorial race in 2022. The two won and were sworn in August 2022. Monda was subsequently impeached for abuse of office and gross misconduct, having solicited a bribe, and removed from office on 29 February 2024.

Monda is a long serving veterinary and an elder of the Seventh Day Adventist church. He hails from the Nyankororo area of Ibeno ward.
