= Willy Komen (politician) =

Kenyan politician (died 2019)

William Kiprop Komen

Member of Parliament for Nakuru West
- In office 1969–1974

Member of Parliament for Nakuru Town
- In office 1975–1979

Member of Parliament for Rongai
- In office 1992–1997

Personal details
- Died: 22 June 2019 (aged 76–77)
- Party: KANU

William Kiprop Komen (died 22 June 2019) was a Kenyan KANU politician who served as a Member of Parliament for Rongai, Nakuru Town, and the former Nakuru West Constituency.

== Political career ==
In 1969, Komen was elected aged 24 as MP of Nakuru West, now forming the constituencies of Njoro, Molo, Kuresoi South and Kuresoi North. He lost this seat in the 1974 general election. In 1975, he won a by-election for the Nakuru Town seat, and held this seat until the 1979 election. Then, in 1992, he became MP for Rongai until 1997.

== Personal life ==
Komen was born to Joseph Kibowen Komen and Talai Tapsarga Komen of Njoro, Nakuru. He was husband to Elizabeth Komen, daughter of Sir Charles Murgor. James Murgor, MP for Keiyo North, was also his brother-in-law. Komen had eleven children: Peter Komen, the late David Komen, John "Boss" Komen, Richie Komen, Chris Komen, Sheila Komen Keino, Patricia Komen among them is Raymond Komen and Kibet Komen, both politicians as well

Komen was a devout Catholic.

On 22 June 2019, Komen died aged 77.
