= Saint Cronan's Boys' National School =

St. Cronan's NS

Location
- Vevay Crescent, Vevay Road; Bray, County Wicklow; Ireland

Information
- School type: Primary
- Motto: Fios Feasa; Irish: Knowledge of Knowledge
- Founded: 1820; 206 years ago
- Staff: c. 45
- Gender: Male
- Age range: 6–13
- Enrollment: 420 approx.
- Classes: First through sixth
- Colours: Blue, yellow
- Sports: Gaelic football, hurling
- Website: www.stcronans.ie

Saint Cronan's National School (Irish: Scoil Chrónáin Naofa) is a national school located in Vevay Crescent, just off the Vevay Road in Bray, County Wicklow, Ireland. It is the oldest primary school in Bray, having been founded in 1820 as Bray Male School. The school is named in honour of Saint Cronan, whose feast day falls on 28 April.

As of 2022, there are approximately 420 boys in the school, aged from 6 to 13 years (first through sixth classes).

== History ==
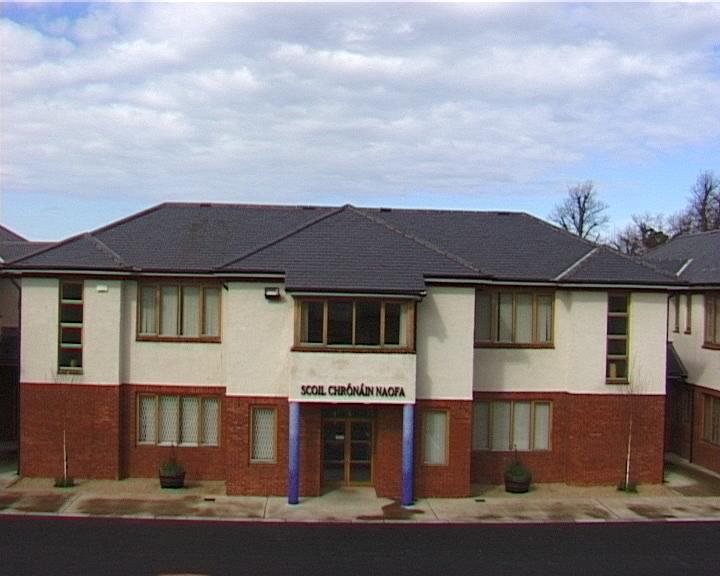
St. Cronan's new building, officially opened on 18 June 2001 by then Minister for Education, Michael Woods.

In 1820, a small number of cottages on Seapoint Road in Bray are believed to have been the site of the first Bray Male Parochial School. It opened on 20 July 1820 and the boys stayed in these premises until 1880. Due to increasing pupil numbers, Bray Male School moved from its original home on Seapoint Road to the Little Flower Hall beside the Holy Redeemer Church off the Main Street in Bray in October 1880. Bray Male School moved again in 1931; this time, the school found a new home in a new building on the Vevay Hill. The school also changed its name at this stage to St Cronan's. On 2 November 1999, St. Cronan's moved to a new building in Vevay Crescent. After the most recent move to the new school building in Vevay Crescent, Gaelscoil Uí Chéadaigh, a Gaelscoil, took up residence in the schoolhouse on the Vevay Hill.

== Curricular studies ==
As a national school, St. Cronan's follows the Primary School Curriculum (1999). The school has a Catholic ethos and prepares its students for the sacraments of Confirmation and Holy Communion. The school was also part of the Modern Languages Initiative until 2012, and Spanish was taught in 5th and 6th classes.

== Sports ==
St. Cronan's GAA
- Scoil Chrónáin Naofa
- County: Wicklow
- Nickname: The Crows
- Colours: Blue, yellow
- Grounds: Páirc Chrónáin, Bray

Playing kits
Standard colours

St. Cronan's has both Gaelic football and hurling teams which compete against other schools in the Wicklow area. The school's Gaelic football team have been county champions on several occasions, and have also won the Coughlin Cup on several occasions. The school's team colours are blue, yellow, and white to match the school's uniform. Prior to the year 2000, the school's colours were red and white; this matched the colour of the previous school uniform.

St. Cronan's trophy cabinet.

=== Gaelic football honours ===
- Coughlin Cup; 1998, 2000, 2006, 2008, 2010, 2011.
- Wicklow Schools League; 1998, 1999, 2000, 2003, 2004.
- Wicklow County Championship (Corn Uí Dhochartaigh, English: O'Doherty Cup); 1999, 2003, 2004, 2006, 2007.
- Mini-Sevens Trophy; 2004, 2005.

=== Hurling honours ===
- Mini-Sevens Trophy; 2006.
- Murphy Cup; 2004.

== Choral ==
St. Cronan's boys choir have performed at local events and also in the National Concert Hall with the National Children's Choir. They have also performed for then President of Ireland, Mary McAleese, in Áras an Uachtaráin. In December 2004, the choir released an album entitled The Magic of Christmas, which included a guest appearance by the late Ronnie Drew of The Dubliners.

On 12 September 2008, St. Cronan's welcomed Liu Biwei, Chinese ambassador to Ireland. The St. Cronan's choir, along with some musicians from the senior classes in the school performed for the ambassador and his diplomatic entourage.

== Charity ==
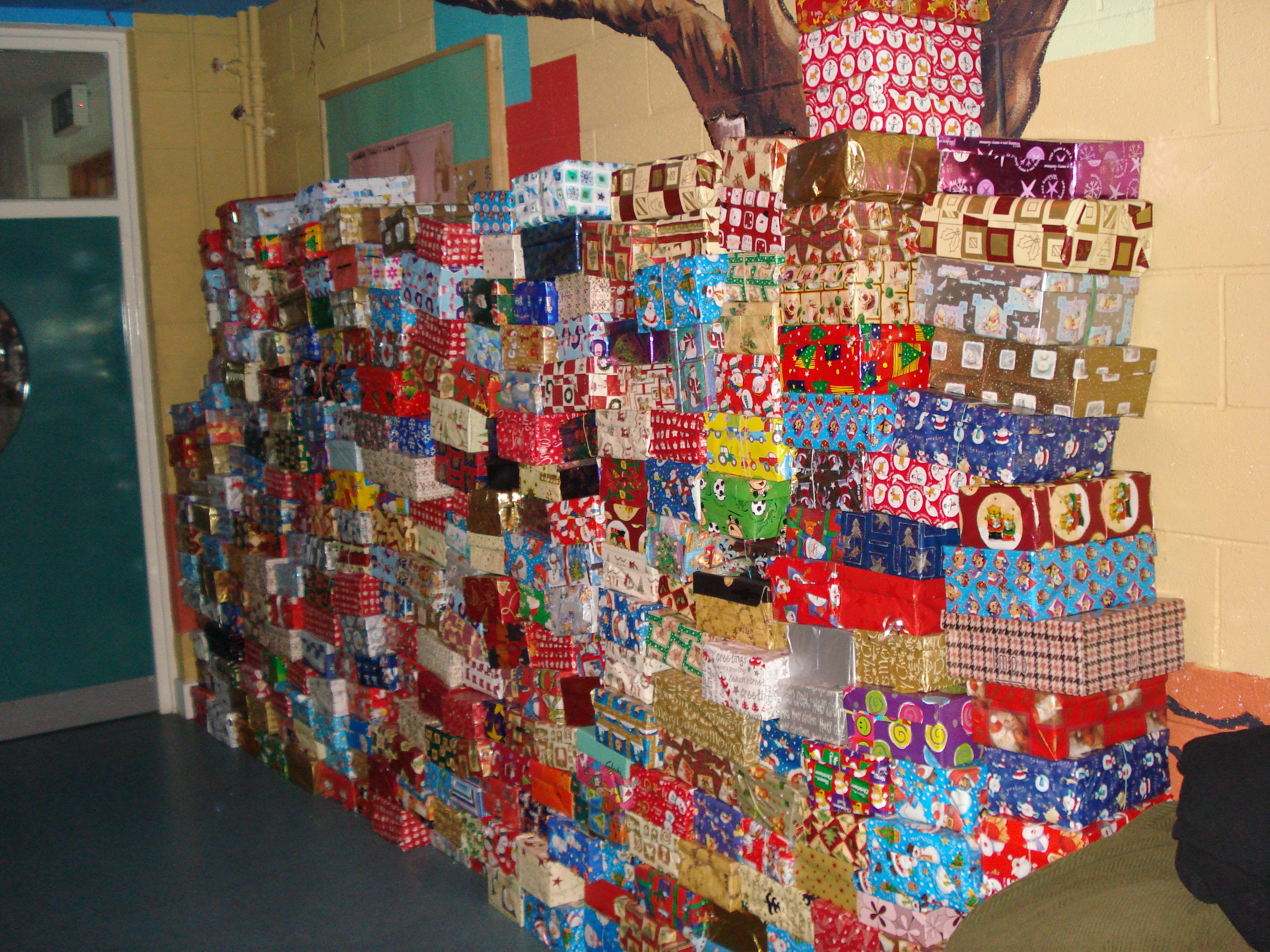
Operation Christmas Child shoeboxes ready for shipping

In the run up to Christmas, students in sixth class take part in the Concern Christmas Fast. In the past, the school has also participated in Operation Christmas Child. This is a project organised by Samaritan's Purse, and involves children putting together a shoebox of simple gifts for distribution among children in desperate situations around the world.

St. Cronan's also has a relationship with Bray Lions Club, and works on many charitable programmes in conjunction with them.

== Other awards ==
St. Cronan's Eircom Junior Spider Website Award 2009

- Discover Primary Science Award; 2006, 2007, 2008, 2009.
- Green Flag Award; 2003, 2005, 2007, 2009, 2011, 2013, 2015.
- European Folk Culture Organisation, Primary Schools Award; 2003.
- Eircom Junior Spider Website Award; 2009
- Digital School of Distinction Award; 2015

== Twinning ==
St. Cronan's is linked with Edgewood Elementary School in the U.S. state of Minnesota. The school is also twinned with the parish of Ikanga, Kenya.

== Notable alumni ==
- Finn Bálor, WWE professional wrestler
- Peter Doyle, cyclist and Olympian
- Bertie Messitt, long-distance runner and Olympian
- Cearbhall Ó Dálaigh, former Attorney General, Chief Justice, and President of Ireland
- Darren Randolph, professional association footballer
