= Public Service Commission (Kenya) =

Government commission for human resources in Kenya

The Public Service Commission (PSC) of Kenya is an independent government commission established under Article 233(1) of the Constitution of Kenya to manage human resources in the Kenya Civil Service and the Local Authorities.

== Roles and functions of the Commission and also their importance ==
Article 234 of the Constitution outlines the functions and powers of the Public Service Commission which are as follows:

1. Subject to the Constitution and legislation: (i) Establish and abolish offices in the public service; and (ii) Appoint persons to hold or act in those offices, and to confirm appointments;
2. Exercise disciplinary control over and remove persons holding or acting in those offices;
3. Promote the values and principles referred to in Articles 10 and 232 throughout the public service;
4. Investigate, monitor and evaluate the organization, administration and personnel practices of the public service;
5. Ensure that the public service is efficient and effective;
6. Develop human resources in the public service;
7. Review and make recommendations to the national government in respect of conditions of service, code of conduct and qualifications of officers in the public service;
8. Evaluate and report to the President and Parliament on the extent to which the values and principles referred to in Articles 10 and 232 are complied with in the public service;
9. Hear and determine appeals in respect of county governments’ public service; and
10. Nomination of persons to the Judicial Service Commission and Salaries Remuneration Commission under Articles 171(2) and 230(2){b} respectively;
11. Recommendation of persons to be appointed as Principal Secretaries under Article 155 (3) (a);
12. Receiving and processing petitions for the removal of the Director of Public Prosecutions and recommending the appointment of a tribunal to investigate the complaints under Article 158(2) (3) and (4);
13. Receiving petitions for the removal of the Registrar and Assistant Registrars of political parties in accordance with Section 37 of the Political Parties Act; and
14. Protection of public officers against victimization and discrimination while discharging their duties in accordance with Article 236 of the Constitution.
15. Recruitment and selection of Vice Chancellors, Deputy Vice Chancellors of Public Universities and Principals and Deputy Principals of Constituent Colleges, under the Universities Act, 2012 (No. 42 of 2012) section 35(1) (a)(v) as amended in the Statute Law (Miscellaneous Amendments) Act 2018.
16. Perform any other functions and exercise any other powers conferred by national legislation. The implementation of these functions is subject to other provisions of the Constitution and the Public Service Commission Act, 2017.

== Membership ==
The current membership of the Commission (2019-2025) is as follows:

- Chairperson: Amb. Anthony M. Muchiri, CBS
- Vice chairperson: Ms Mary Kimonye, CBS
- Commissioners: Harun Maalimu, Mwanamaka Mabruki, CBS, Boya Molu, EBS, Dr. Irene Asienga, Dr. Francis o. Owino, CBS, Francis Meja and Joan Machayo.
- Secretary and Chief Executive: Mr. Paul Famba, CBS
