= Fafi Constituency =

Kenyan electoral constituency

Fafi
- constituency for the Parliament of Kenya
- Fafi Constituency within Garissa County

- Garissa County within Kenya
- County: Garissa
- Population: 134,040
- Area: 15,050 km^{2} (5,810.8 sq mi)

Current constituency
- Number of members: 1
- Party: UDA
- Member of Parliament: Salah Yakub Farah
- Wards: 5

Fafi Constituency(it was hived off from Garissa central in 1988) is an electoral constituency in Kenya. It is one of the six constituencies and the largest in Garissa County. The constituency was established in 1988 . The constituency has six wards, all electing ward representatives for the Garissa County Assembly.

== Members of Parliament ==
Elections	MP	Party	Notes
1988	Ibrahim Mohamed Salat	KANU	One-party system.
1992	Ibrahim Mohamed Salat	KANU	
1997	Elias Barre Shill	SAFINA	
2002	Aden Sugow	KANU	
2007	Aden Sugow	KANU	
2013	Elias Barre Shill	URP	
2017	Abdikarim Osman Riti	JP	
. 2022	Salah Yakub Hangool	UDA	

== Locations and wards ==
Locations
Location	Population*
Bulla Golol	6,040
Bura	6,706
Fafi	5,669
Galmagala	4,569
Gubis	4,141
Hadi	6,180
Hulugho	13,073
Jarajilla (Amuma)	4,437
Kamuthe	3,980
Mansababu	5,889
Nanighi	4,664
Welmerer	70,258
Yumbis	1,995
Total	x
1999 census.

Wards
Ward	Registered Voters
Bura	962
Fafi	1,319
Jarajilla	402
Masabubu	837
Nanighi	3,060
Welmerer	2,759
Total	9,339
*September 2005.
