= Clement Muchiri Wambugu =

Kenyan politician

Hon. Clement Muchiri Wambugu

Member of Parliament for Mathioya Constituency
- In office 2008–2017
- Preceded by: Joseph Kamotho
- Succeeded by: Peter Kimari

Personal details
- Party: PNU (2007–2013); The National Alliance (2013–2017)
- Education: Wahundura High School
- Occupation: Politician
- Profession: Public Servant
- Known for: Mathioya Secondary Schools Computerization Program, Rabbit Rearing Program, Energy Saving Rocket Technology Project

Clement Muchiri Wambugu is a Kenyan politician. He is the immediate former Member of Parliament for Mathioya constituency in Murang'a county. He was first elected to the Parliament in the 2007 Kenyan general election to represent Mathioya Constituency in the National Assembly of Kenya under the PNU (Party of National Unity). Wambugu, a newcomer in politics, beat the incumbent and long serving MP for Mathioya, Joseph Kamotho, by garnering 9597 against Kamotho's 3156 votes. Wambugu was reelected on the National Alliance party ticket in the 2013 Kenyan general election. He was unable to defend his seat in the 2017 Kenyan general election, where he was unseated by another newcomer, Honorable Peter Kimari, who is currently serving as the member of Parliament for Mathioya constituency.

Wambugu, a prominent Wahundura High School alumnus, has been supportive of the school and instrumental in reviving its Old Boys Association. He also previously worked for the African Express Airways and served in a team, appointed by Chirau Ali Mwakwere (the then Minister for Transport), to investigate the Kenya Police Helicopter accident, which happened in Kapsabet on 11 May 2009.

He has been instrumental in introducing the Mathioya Secondary Schools Computerization Program, the Mathioya Education Day, the Rabbit Rearing Program, and the Energy Saving Rocket Technology (funded by GTZ/PSDA) for the Mathioya youth, and several other projects during his first term of office. It is also under his leadership and first term in office that Mathioya Constituency was voted the most improved constituency by a leading research firm.

== See also ==
- Politics of Kenya
