= James Murgor =

Kenyan politician

James Kipkosgei Murgor is a Kenyan politician and a Member of Parliament for Keiyo North Constituency since 2013.

Murgor is a trained medical doctor with an undergraduate degree in Medicine & Surgery and a Masters in Internal Medicine, both from the University of Nairobi. Before joining politics he was a practicing medical consultant running Cherang’any Nursing Home.

He previously worked at Kitui, Machakos and Kenyatta National Hospital as a Medical Officer and a Registrar respectively.

He is the brother-in-law of the late Rongai MP Willy Komen.
