= Samuel Atandi =

Kenyan politician

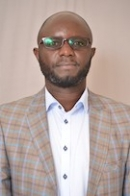

Samuel Atandi is a Kenyan politician from the Orange Democratic Movement who has been Member of the National Assembly for Alego Usonga since 2017. He was re-elected at the 2022 general election.

He graduated from Egerton University with a bachelor's degree in Economics and worked at the National Bank of Kenya.

== See also ==
- 12th Parliament of Kenya
- 13th Parliament of Kenya
