= Kangema Constituency =

Electoral constituency in Kenya

Kangema
- constituency for the Parliament of Kenya
- Kangema Constituency within Murang'a County

- Murang'a County within Kenya
- County: Murang'a
- Population: 80,447
- Area: 174 km^{2} (67.2 sq mi)

Current constituency
- Number of members: 1
- Party: UDA
- Member of Parliament: Peter Irungu Kihungi
- Wards: 3

Kangema Constituency is an electoral constituency in Muranga County, Kenya.

It encompasses Kangema township which is the headquarters of the newly created Murang'a North District. Murang'a North is a heavily populated district of the Central Province and it covers a vast portion of the Aberdare Ranges. The economic mainstay for Kangema is agriculture, most of the land being under Tea, Coffee, wattle and subsistence food crops. There is vibrant trade of consumer goods in the township and the adjacent towns of Gakira, Gitugu, Kiairathe Kanyenya-ini and Rwathia.

Nascent industry includes milk, tea and coffee processing factories. The area is well served by transport and communication infrastructure.

== Members of Parliament ==
Elections	MP	Party	Notes	Years served
1963	Julius Gikonyo Kiano	KANU		1963 - 1966
1966	R. Mwangi Wanjagi	KANU	One-party system	1966 - 1974
1969	R. Mwangi Wanjagi	KANU	One-party system	
1974	Joseph (J.J.) Kamotho	KANU	One-party system	1974 - 1983
1979	Joseph (J.J.) Kamotho	KANU	One-party system	
1983	John Njoroge Michuki	KANU	One-party system.	1983 - 1988
1988	Joseph (J.J.) Kamotho	KANU	One-party system.	1988 - 1992
1992	John Njoroge Michuki	Ford-Asili		1992 - 2012
1997	John Njoroge Michuki	Ford-People		
2002	John Njoroge Michuki	NARC		
2007	John Njoroge Michuki	PNU		
2012	Tiras Nyingi Ngahu	TNA		
2017	Clement Muturi Kigano	(JP)		
2022	Peter Irungu Kihungi	UDA		

== Locations and wards ==
=== Locations ===
Location	Population
Iyego	17,843
Kanyenyaini	16,489
Kiruri	9,214
Muguru	18,498
Rwathia	18,558
Total	80,602
*1999 census.

=== Wards ===
Ward	Registered Voters	Local Authority
Gakira	3,814	Kangema town
Iyego	7765	Muranga county
Kanyenyaini	9,018	Muranga county
Kiairathe	1,629	Kangema town
Kiruri	4,977	Muranga county
Muringaini	2,066	Kangema town
Rwathia	9,230	Muranga county
Watuha	2,789	Kangema town
Total	41,704	
*September 2005.
