= David Karithi =

Kenyan politician (born 1967)

David Karithi (born 18 December 1967 in Tigania, Meru County) is a Kenyan politician and a member of the 11th parliament of Kenya elected from Tigania West Constituency in Meru County on the ticket of The National Alliance (TNA) in 2013. He served on the house committee on Health. According to Mzalendo Trust, Karithi made a total of 34 speeches during the session of the 11th parliament from 2013 to 2016.
