= Nakuru West Constituency =

Nakuru West Constituency is a former electoral constituency in Kenya. It was renamed to Molo Constituency in 1988.

== Members of Parliament ==
Elections	MP	Party
1963	Harry James Onamu	KANU
1969	Willy Komen	KANU
1974	E. N. Kariuki	KANU
1979	James Njenga Mungai	KANU
1983	James Njenga Mungai	KANU
