= Baringo East Constituency =

Kenyan electoral constituency

Baringo East Constituency was a former electoral constituency in Kenya. It was one of three constituencies in Baringo District, Rift Valley Province. The constituency was established for the 1963 elections. The constituency had nine wards, all electing councillors for the Baringo County Council.

== Members of Parliament ==
Elections	MP	Party	Notes
1963	Willy R.Y. Kamuren	KADU	One-party system
1969	Stephen Lomeri Cheptai	KANU	One-party system
1974	James Kalegeno	KANU	One-party system
1979	Samson Karturkana Twarith	KANU	One-party system
1983	Samson Karturkana Twarith	KANU	One-party system
1988	Samson Karturkana Twarith	KANU	One-party system
1992	Joseph Dalldosso Lotodo	KANU	
1997	Joseph Dalldosso Lotodo	KANU	
2002	Asman Kamama	Ford-People	
2007	Asman Kamama	PNU	
2013	Asman Kamama	JP	
2017	Kamket Kassait William	KANU	

== Wards ==
Wards
Ward	Registered Voters
Akoret	628
Churo	2,758
Kolowa	3,167
Korossi	917
Loiyamorok	1,886
Ribkwo / Kositei	2,707
Silale	1,025
Tangulbei	2,239
Tirioko	2,229
Total	17,556
*September 2005,
