= Kipkorir =

Kipkorir, sometimes shortened as "P'korir" when speaking, is a given name given to a person (male) born at dawn. It is of Kenyan origin.

== Politicians ==
- Kigen Luka Kipkorir, Kenyan politician and National Assembly member for the Orange Democratic Movement
- Robert Kiptoo Kipkorir, Kenyan politician and former National Assembly member
- William Kipkorir (1967–2025), Kenyan politician and National Assembly member for the Orange Democratic Movement

== Runners ==
- Bisluke Kiplagat Kipkorir (born 1988), Kenyan steeplechase runner
- Daniel Kipkorir Chepyegon (born 1986), Ugandan marathon runner
- David Chelule Kipkorir (born 1977), Kenyan long-distance track runner
- Jonathan Kosgei Kipkorir (born 1982), Kenyan marathon runner and two-time Venice Marathon winner
- Mbarak Kipkorir Hussein (born 1965), Kenyan marathon runner competing for the United States
- Michael Kipkorir Kipyego (born 1983), Kenyan marathon runner and former steeplechase specialist
- Nicholas Chelimo Kipkorir (born 1983), Kenyan marathon runner and two-time Honolulu Marathon winner
- Robert Kipkorir Kipchumba (born 1984), Kenyan road running athlete
- Stephen Kipkorir (1970–2008), Kenyan middle-distance runner and Olympics medallist in the 1500 metres

== See also ==
- Jepkorir, related surname meaning "daughter of Korir"
