= Nyatike Constituency =

Kenyan electoral constituency

Nyatike
- constituency for the Parliament of Kenya
- Nyatike Constituency within Migori County

- Migori County within Kenya
- County: Migori County
- Population: 176,162
- Area: 677 km^{2} (261.4 sq mi)

Current constituency
- Number of members: 1
- Party: ODM
- Member of Parliament: Tom Mboya Odege
- Wards: 7

Nyatike is an electoral constituency in Kenya. It is one of eight constituencies of Migori County. There are seven wards in the constituency, all electing members (MCAs) to the Migori County Assembly. The constituency was established in 1986 for the 1988 elections. Being a semi-arid region, residents of Nyatike mainly depend on fishing as the major economic activity. Around the areas of Macalder and Osiri, small-scale gold mining has also become a source of livelihood. Currently, the constituency is a major player in Migori County politics as it has the highest number of voters of the 8 constituencies.

== Members of Parliament ==
Elections	MP	Party	Notes
Nyatike Constituency created from Ndhiwa and Migori
1988	Tobias Orao Ochola Ogur	KANU	One-party system.
1992	Tobias Orao Ochola Ogur	FORD-Kenya	
1997	Tom Onyango	NDP	
2002	Tobias Orao Ochola Ogur	NARC	
2007	Peter Edick Omondi Anyanga	ODM	
2013	Peter Edick Omondi Anyanga	ODM	
2017	Tom Mboya Odege	ODM	
2022	Tom Mboya Odege	ODM	

== Wards ==
Wards
Ward	Registered Voters
North Kadem	12,974
Got Kachola	9,274
Kachieng'	8,659
Kaler	4,307
Macalder/Kanyarwanda	10,880
Kanyasa	6,595
Muhuru	8,786
Total	61,477
*September 2005.
