= Tigania West Constituency =

Kenyan electoral constituency

Tigania West
- constituency for the Parliament of Kenya
- Tigania West Constituency within Meru County

- Meru County within Kenya
- County: Meru
- Population: 139,961
- Area: 399 km^{2} (154.1 sq mi)

Current constituency
- Number of members: 1
- Party: UDA
- Member of Parliament: John Kanyuithia Mutunga
- Wards: 5

Tigania West Constituency is an electoral constituency in Kenya. It is one of nine constituencies of Meru County. The constituency has five wards, all of which elect Members of County Assembly (MCAs) for the Meru County Assembly. The constituency was established for the 1997 elections.

It was one of four constituencies of the former Meru North District.

== Members of Parliament ==
Elections	MP	Party	Notes
1997	Benjamim R. Ndubai	DP	
2000	Stephen Mukangu	KANU	By-election
2002	Kilemi Mwiria	NARC	
2007	Kilemi Mwiria	PNU	
2013	David Karithi	The National Alliance	
2017	Dr. John K. Mutunga	jubilee	

== Kitheo location ==
Locations
Location	Population*
Akithi	39,407
Kianjai	14,519
Kimachia	12,157
Kiorimba	4,489
Kitheo	13,759
Mbeu	16.753
Miathene	13,260
Nkomo	14,718
Total	x
1999 census.

Wards
Ward	Registered Voters
Akithi	12,208
Kianjai	9,555
Kitheo	3,956
Mbeu	6,093
Mituntu
Nkomo	8,454
Total	44,906
*September 2005.
