= Mathioya Constituency =

Kenyan electoral constituency

Mathioya
- constituency for the Parliament of Kenya
- Mathioya Constituency within Muranga County

- Muranga County within Kenya
- County: Muranga
- Population: 92,814
- Area: 178 km^{2} (68.7 sq mi)

Current constituency
- Number of members: 1
- Party: UDA
- Member of Parliament: Edwin Mugo Gichuki
- Wards: 3

Mathioya Constituency is an electoral constituency in Kenya. It is one of seven constituencies of Muranga County. The constituency has three wards comprising Kiru, Kamacharia and Gitugi wards all electing Members of the County Assembly to the Muranga County Assembly.

Mathioya Constituency has six Locations: Aberdare Forest, Gitugi, Kamacharia, Kiru, Njumbi, and Rwathia. According to the Muranga District’s Statistics Office 2001, Mathioya’s population is 110,139, and is the second largest Constituency after Kiharu with 136.9 sq miles (220.8sq. km). Mathioya however is the most densely populated with 110,139 against the nearest Kahuro Constituency with 92,104.

Mathioya Constituency has a steep hilly topography and a climate suitable mainly for tea production, although there are pockets of coffee plantations. The lower parts of Mathioya also grow the macadamia nuts which were introduced in the mid 80’s by the Kenya Nut Company, while the upper part, which is much cooler due to the proximity to the Aberdare Ranges grows pears, plums, apples, tea and coffee.

The following Members of Parliament have represented the constituency.

== Members of Parliament ==
Elections	MP	Party
1997	F. Njakwe Maina	Ford-People
2002	John Joseph Kamotho	NARC
2007	Clement Muchiri Wambugu	PNU
2013	Clement Muchiri Wambugu	TNA
2017	Peter Kimari Kihara	JP
2022	Edwin Mugo Gichuki	UDA

== Locations and wards ==
Locations	Population
Aberdare Forest	11
Gitugi	26,046
Kamacharia	22,375
Kiru	26,281
Njumbi	28,431
Total	103,144
1999 census.

Ward	Registered Voters
Gitugi	12,562
Kamacharia	12,316
Kiru	13,364
Njumbi	9,979
Total	48,221
*September 2005.
