= Wilfred Moriasi Ombui =

Kenyan politician

Moriasi Wilfred Ombui is a Kenyan politician. He belongs to the Kenya African National Union and was elected to represent the North Mugirango Borabu Constituency in the National Assembly of Kenya since the 2007 Kenyan general election.

He lost his parliamentary seat during the 2013 general elections.
