= Narok South Constituency =

Kenyan electoral constituency

Narok South
- constituency for the Parliament of Kenya
- Narok South Constituency within Narok County

- Narok County within Kenya
- County: Narok
- Population: 238,472
- Area: 4,577 km^{2} (1,767.2 sq mi)

Current constituency
- Number of members: 1
- Party: Independent
- Member of Parliament: Kitilai Ole Ntutu
- Wards: 6

Narok South is an electoral constituency in Kenya. It is one of six constituencies of Narok County. The constituency was established for the 1966 elections. The constituency has 6 wards, all electing Member of the County Assembly (MCA) for the Narok County Assembly.

== Members of Parliament ==
Elections	MP	Party	Notes
1966	P. T. ole Lemein	KANU	One-party system
1969	Meshak Partasio ole Nampaso	KANU	One-party system
1974	Meshak Partasio ole Nampaso	KANU	One-party system
1979	Meshak Partasio ole Nampaso	KANU	One-party system
1983	Meshak Partasio ole Nampaso	KANU	One-party system.
1988	Meshak Partasio ole Nampaso	KANU	One-party system.
1990	Samson K. ole Tuya	KANU	By-elections, one party-system
1992	Samson K. ole Tuya	KANU	
1997	Stephen Kanyinke Ntutu	KANU	
2002	Stephen Kanyinke Ntutu	KANU	
2007	Nkoidilla Lankas	ODM	10th Parliament of Kenya
2013	Korei Ole Lemein	URP	11th Parliament of Kenya
2017	Korei Ole Lemein	Jubilee Party	12th Parliament of Kenya
2022	Kitilai Ole Ntutu	Independent	13th Parliament of Kenya

== Wards ==
Wards
Ward	Registered Voters
Sogoo	10, 072
Sagamian	7,523
Ololulunga	15,922
Naroosura/Majimoto	18,829
Loita	11,350
Melelo	11,353
Total	75,049
July 2025
IEBC data for 2022 elections	
