= Budalangi Constituency =

Budalangi Constituency is an electoral constituency in Kenya. It is one of seven constituencies in Busia County. The constituency was established for the 1997 elections. The physical setting of Budalangi at the floodplain of River Nzoia and increased runoff from degraded catchments has been contributory factors to flooding disasters experienced in the region every year, destroying thousands of crop fields and leaving thousands of families homeless. In most cases, River Nzoia breaks its banks due to the backflow of Lake Victoria, flooding the entire field within days. The most recent catastrophic disaster was caused by Lake Kanyaboli which broke all of its dykes and drained more than 50% of its volume to the region, sweeping away everything on its way.

== Members of Parliament ==
| Elections | MP | Party | Notes |
|---|---|---|---|
| 1997 | Raphael Bitta Sauti Wanjala | Ford-K | |
| 2002 | Raphael Bitta Sauti Wanjala | NARC | |
| 2007 | Ababu Namwamba | ODM | |
| 2013 | Ababu Namwamba ODM Defected to LPK | | |
| 2017 | Raphael Bitta Sauti Wanjala | ODM | |
| 2022 | Raphael Bitta Sauti Wanjala | ODM | |

== Locations and wards ==
Locations
| Location | Population* |
| Bunyala Central | 10,699 |
| Bunyala East | 13,877 |
| Bunyala North | 13,343 |
| Bunyala South | 6,314 |
| Bunyala West | 16,064 |
| Khajula | 7,395 |
| Total | x |
1999 census.

Wards
| Ward | Registered Voters |
| Bunyala Central | 7725 |
| Bunyala West | 14863 |
| Bunyala North | 13637 |
| Bunyala South | 9807 |
| Total | 46,032 |
*August 2022.
