= Ikanga =

Village in Kitui District, Kenya

Coordinates: 1°42′21″S 38°3′49″E

Ikanga is a village in Kitui District, Kenya, about 230 km (140 mi) east of Nairobi. It is 50 kilometres (31 mi) south of Kitui town along the B7 road between Kitui and Kibwezi. Ikanga forms a ward in the Kitui South Constituency and Kitui County Council. The total population of Ikanga and Kyatune was projected to be 36,185 in 2012.

The parish of Ikanga belongs to the Southern Deanery of the Catholic Diocese of Kitui. The village is also the twin parish of the Parish of the Most Holy Redeemer in Bray, County Wicklow, Ireland. This parish is also linked to St. Cronan's Boys National School in Bray.
