= Alfred Odhiambo =

Kenyan politician

Bwire Alfred Odhiambo is a Kenyan politician. He belongs to the Orange Democratic Movement and was elected to represent the Butula Constituency as the 3rd representative in the National Assembly of Kenya since the 2007 Kenyan parliamentary election.
