= Nkoidilla Lankas =

Kenyan politician

Nkoidilla Lankas is a Kenyan politician. He belongs to the Orange Democratic Movement and was elected to represent the Narok South Constituency in the National Assembly of Kenya since the 2007 Kenyan parliamentary election.
