= Peter Edick Omondi Anyanga =

Kenyan politician

Peter Edick Omondi Anyanga is a Kenyan politician. He belongs to the Orange Democratic Movement and was elected to represent the Nyatike Constituency in the National Assembly of Kenya since the 2007 Kenyan parliamentary election.
