= Edwin Ochieng Yinda =

Kenyan politician

Edwin Ochieng Yinda is a Kenyan politician. He belongs to the Orange Democratic Movement party and was elected to represent the Alego Constituency in the National Assembly of Kenya since the 2007 Kenyan parliamentary election. He was in the 2013 Kenyan parliamentary election by George Washington Muluan Omondi, making him the second one-term member of parliament in the region after KANU's Peter Okudo of 1969.
