= Ntoitha M'mithiaru =

Kenyan politician

Ntoitha M'mithiaru is a Kenyan politician. He belongs to the Party of National Unity and was elected to represent the Igembe North Constituency in the National Assembly of Kenya since the 2007 Kenyan parliamentary election. He holds an MBA from Kenyatta University. He is married with four children. He died on 13 February 2023.
