= Asman Kamama =

Kenyan politician

Kamama Asman Abongutum is a Kenyan politician. He belongs to the Party of National Unity, through its coalition partner NARC-Kenya and was elected to represent the Baringo East Constituency in the National Assembly of Kenya since the 2007 Kenyan parliamentary election. He failed in his 2017 bid to be re-elected, garnering 34% of the vote.
