= Kitui South Constituency =

Kenyan electoral constituency

Kitui South Constituency is an electoral constituency in Kenya. It is one of eight constituencies in Kitui County. The constituency was established for the 1963 elections. At the 1988 and 1992 elections it was known as Mutomo Constituency. The constituency has six wards, all electing Members of County Assembly for the Kitui County Government.

== Members of Parliament ==
Elections	MP	Party	Notes
1963	Philip Nzuki Mbai	KANU	one-party system
1969	Philip Nzuki Mbai	KANU	One-party system
1974	Patrice Mwangu Ivuti	KANU	One-party system
1979	Patrice Mwangu Ivuti	KANU	One-party system
1983	E. Mwangu Ivuti	KANU	One-party system.
1988	Philip Nzuki Mbai	KANU	One-party system.
1992	Isaac Mulatya Muoki	KANU	
1997	Samuel Kalii Kiminza	SDP	
2002	Patrice Mwangu Ivuti	Ford-Asili	
2007	Isaac Mulatya Muoki	ODM-Kenya	
2013	Racheal Nyamai	NARC	Multiparty system - under new constitution.
2017	Racheal Nyamai	Jubilee	Multiparty system - under new constitution.
2022	Racheal Nyamai	Jubilee	Multiparty system - under new constitution.

== Wards ==
Wards
Ward	Registered Voters
Ikanga / Kyatune	14,385
Ikutha	10,800
Kanziko	7,699
Athi	14,427
Mutha	9,744
Mutomo / Kibwea	11,130
Total	68,185
*September 2021. By Kamba Insights ~ Kitui County Registered Voters Per Ward & Constituency
