= Marakwet West Constituency =

Kenyan electoral constituency

Marakwet West
- constituency for the Parliament of Kenya
- Marakwet West Constituency within Elgeyo/Marakwet County

- Elgeyo/Marakwet County within Kenya
- County: Elgeyo-Marakwet
- Population: 137,513
- Area: 738 km^{2} (284.9 sq mi)

Current constituency
- Number of members: 1
- Party: Independent
- Member of Parliament: Timothy Kipchumba Toroitich
- Wards: 6

Marakwet West is an electoral constituency in Kenya. It is one of four constituencies of Elgeyo-Marakwet County. The constituency has six wards, all elect councillors for the Marakwet County Council. The constituency was established for the 1997 elections. It was one of two constituencies in the former Marakwet District.

== Members of Parliament ==
Elections	MP	Party	Notes
1997	David Kiprono Sudi	KANU	
2002	David Kiprono Sudi	KANU	
2007	Boaz Kipchumba Kaino	ODM	
2013	William Kipkemoi Kisang	URP	
2017	William Kipkemoi Kisang	Jubilee Party	
2022	TimothyToroitich Wakili	Independent	

== Registered Voters Per Ward ==
Polling stations
Ward	Registered Voters
Arror	5,243
Cherang'any/Chebororwo	9,679
Moiben/Kuserwo	10,775
Kapsowar	13,187
Lelan	10,081
Sengwer	9,603
Total	58,568
*August 2022.
