= Isaac Mulatya Muoki =

Kenyan politician

Isaac Mulatya Muoki is a Kenyan politician. He belongs to the Orange Democratic Movement – Kenya and was elected to represent the Kitui South Constituency in the National Assembly of Kenya from 2007 Kenyan parliamentary election to 2013. It is his second stint as an MP, previously he won the constituency seat in 1992, then representing the KANU party
