= Daniel Muoki =

Kenyan politician

Daniel Muoki is a Kenyan politician. He belongs to the Orange Democratic Movement-Kenya and was elected to represent the Mwala Constituency in the National Assembly of Kenya since the 2007 Kenyan parliamentary election.
