= Josephat Koli Nanok =

Kenyan politician

Josephat Koli Nanok is a Kenyan politician. He belongs to the Orange Democratic Movement and was elected to represent the Turkana South Constituency in the National Assembly of Kenya since the 2007 Kenyan general election.
