= Joseph Nganga Kiuna =

Kenyan politician

Joseph Nganga Kiuna is a Kenyan politician. He belongs to the Party of National Unity and was elected to represent the Molo Constituency in the National Assembly of Kenya since the 2007 Kenyan parliamentary election. He won the member of parliament of Njoro Constituency in 2013 following the split of Molo Constituency and lost in 2017 to the incumbent Charity Kathambi.
