= Namesyus Warugongo =

Kenyan politician

Namesyus Warugongo is a Kenyan politician. He belongs to the Party of National Unity and was elected to represent the Kieni Constituency in the National Assembly of Kenya since the 2007 Kenyan general election.
