= Nakuru Town Constituency =

Coordinates: 00°17′S 36°04′E

Nakuru Town Constituency is a former electoral constituency in Kenya. The constituency was established for the 1963 elections. The entire constituency was located within Nakuru municipality. In 2010, the constituency was split into Nakuru Town East Constituency and Nakuru Town West Constituency.

== Members of Parliament ==
Elections	MP	Party	Notes
1963	Achieng Oneko	KANU	
1966	Mark Waruiru Mwithaga	KANU	
1969	Mark Waruiru Mwithaga	KANU	One-party system
1974	Mark Waruiru Mwithaga	KANU	One-party system
1976	Willy Komen	KANU	By-elections, One-party system
1979	Mark Waruiru Mwithaga	KANU	One-party system
1983	Amos Kabiru Kimemia	KANU	One-party system.
1988	Amos Kabiru Kimemia	KANU	One-party system.
1992	J. C. Lwali-Oyondi	Ford-Asili	
1997	David Manyara Njuki	DP	
2002	Mirugi Kariuki	NARC	Kariuki died in an aviation accident in 2006
2006	William Kariuki Mirugi	NARC-K	By-elections
2007	Lee Maiyani Kinyanjui	PNU	

== Locations and wards ==
Locations
Location	Population*
Baruti	11,633
Central	97,811
Kaptembwo	137,317
Lake Nakuru	426
Lanet	46,217
Total	x
1999 census.

Wards
Ward	Registered Voters
Barut East	2,502
Barut West	2,838
Biashara	21,028
Bondeni	4,119
Hospital	6,700
Kaptembwa	7,200
Kivumbini	12,420
Lake View	6,019
Langa Langa	8,135
Menengai	4,696
Nakuru East	9,854
Rhoda	7,916
Shabab	9,751
Shauri Yako	4,541
Viwanda	4,863
Total	112,582
*September 2005.
