= Nithi Constituency =

Kenyan electoral constituency

Nithi Constituency was a former electoral constituency in Kenya. It was the only constituency in the now defunct Meru South District (1992-2009). The constituency was established for the 1988 elections. It is among the few constituencies in Kenya that have embraced technology. More information on the constituency can be viewed on the constituencies official website

== Members of Parliament ==
Elections	MP	Party	Notes
1963	Philip Nyagah	KANU	
1969	Njue Mutua	KANU	
1974	Bernard Mate	KANU	
1979	Dr. James Kanyama	KANU	
1989	Njue Mutua (Kibanga)	KANU	
1992	Bernard Njoka Mutani	DP	
1997	Bernard Njoka Mutani	DP	
2000	Eustace Mbuba M. Nthiga	KANU	By-election
2002	Petkay Shen M’Nkiria	NARC	
2007	Japhet Kareke Mbiuki	KANU	

== Locations and wards ==
Locations
Location	Population*
Chogoria	18,515
Ganga	19,520
Gitareni	9,742
Gitinje	12,025
Itungururu	3,365
Kabuboni	5,310
Kajuki	7,562
Kamaindi	3,124
Kamwimbi	5,495
Karingani	19,182
Kiang'ondu	15,040
Kiera	11,178
Kithangani	4,539
Maara	13,728
Makuuni	9,571
Mitheru	17,421
Mugwe	11,653
Muiru	5,866
Murugi	16,482
Muthambi	9,464
Mutino	9,198
Mwonge	7,203
Rubate	4,604
Thuita	13,672
Total	x
1999 census.

Wards
Ward	Registered Voters	
Chogoria	4,719	Chogoria town
Kiraro	3,571	Chogoria town
Murugi East	3,890	Chogoria town
Murugi West	3,591	Chogoria town
Chuka east	3,575	Chuka municipality
Kiang'ondu	6,572	Chuka municipality
Mugirirwa East	2,517	Chuka municipality
Mugirirwa West	2,449	Chuka municipality
Muiru East	1,770	Chuka municipality
Ganga	8,155	Meru South county
Gitarene	3,708	Meru South county
Kajuki	5,965	Meru South county
Kamwimbi	3,512	Meru South county
Kiera	10,309	Meru South county
Kithangani / Mariani	3,628	Meru South county
Magumoni	9,667	Meru South county
Mitheru	7,212	Meru South county
Muiru West	2,279	Meru South county
Muthambi	9,035	Meru South county
Mwonge	7,762	Meru South county
Total	103,886	
*September 2005.
