= Salaries and Remuneration Commission =

The Salaries and Remuneration Commission is a Kenyan government Commission established under the Salaries & Remuneration Commission Act, 2011. Its independence is guaranteed in the Constitution of Kenya.

== Role ==
The functions of the commission as defined in the act that established it are to:

- Inquire into and determine the salaries and remuneration to be paid out of public funds to State officers and other public officers
- Keep under review all matters relating to the salaries and remuneration of public officers
- Advise the national and county governments on the harmonization, equity and fairness of remuneration for the attraction and retention of requisite skills in the public sector
- Conduct comparative surveys on the labour markets and trends in remuneration to determine the monetary worth of the jobs of public offices
- Determine the cycle of salaries and remuneration review upon which Parliament may allocate adequate funds for implementation
- Make recommendations on matters relating to the salary and remuneration of a particular State or public officer
- Make recommendations on the review of pensions payable to holders of public offices

== Membership ==
The Commission has one of the largest memberships of Commissioners drawn from a wide spectrum of stakeholder representatives. The current membership and representation of the Commission is as follows:

- Ms. Sarah Jepkemboi Chumo Serem (Chairperson)
- Daniel Ogutu representing the Public Service Commission
- Sellestine Kiuluku representing the Judicial Service Commission
- Serah kinyua representing the Teachers Service Commission
- Rtd Brig Samuel Ndururi representing the Defence Council
- Isaiah Kubai representing the Central Organisation of Trade Unions COTU
- Jacqueline Mugo representing Employers
- Ann Elizabeth Owuor representing Association of Professional Societies in East Africa
- Peter Oloo-Aringo representing the Parliamentary Service Commission
- Jason Namasake representing the Senate
- Joseph kinyua representing the Cabinet Secretary for Finance
- Titus Ndambuki representing the Cabinet Secretary for Public Service
- Wanjuki Muchemi representing the Attorney-General

== Notable events and proposals ==
On 7 October 2012, the commission declared a hefty exit package that MPs had awarded themselves illegal and indicated that it would move to court to block it.

Following extensive research in the United States, UK, Canada, Australia, South Africa, Tanzania and Rwanda, the commission released a new salary structure on 5 February 2013. The structure had significant cuts to the pay of state officers. They also appealed to the public to make their suggestions so that they can be taken into consideration.
