= Fred Kapondi =

Kenyan politician

Fred Kapondi is a Kenyan politician. He belongs to the United Democratic Alliance and was elected to represent the Mt. Elgon Constituency in the National Assembly of Kenya since the 2017 Kenyan general election.
