= Boaz Kipchumba Kaino =

Kenyan politician

Kaino Boaz Kipchuma is a retired Kenyan politician and was elected to represent the Marakwet West Constituency in the National Assembly of Kenya since the 2007 Kenyan parliamentary election.
