= Mwala Constituency =

Electoral constituency in Kenya

Mwala
- constituency for the Parliament of Kenya
- Mwala Constituency within Machakos County

- Machakos County within Kenya
- County: Machakos
- Population: 181,896
- Area: 1,013 km^{2} (391.1 sq mi)

Current constituency
- Number of members: 1
- Party: UDA
- Member of Parliament: Vincent Musyoka Musau
- Wards: 6

Mwala Constituency is an electoral constituency in Kenya. The estimate terrain elevation above sea level is 834 meters. It is one of eight constituencies in Machakos County. The constituency was established for the 1988 elections. The constituency has seven wards, all electing councilors for the Masaku County Council.

== Members of Parliament ==
Elections	MP	Party	Notes
1988	Gideon Nzioka Wambua	KANU	One-party system.(Moi Regime)
1992	Peter M. Kavisi	KANU	
1997	John Mutua Katuku	SDP	
2002	John Mutua Katuku	NARC	Kibaki Regime
2007	Daniel Muoki	ODM-Kenya	
[[2013 Kenyan general election /-2017 kenyan general electionVincent musyoka	2022]]	Vincent Musyoka Musau	MCCP
2022	Musau Vincent Musyoka	UDA	Kenya general election 2022(Ruto's Regime)

== Locations and wards ==
Locations
Location	Population
Ikalaasa	9,979
Kibauni	10,643
Masii	26,717
Mbiuni	33,373
Miu	13,741
Muthetheni	17,816
Mwala	35,425
Vyulya	11,850
Wamunyu	14,462
Yathui	13,123
Total	187,129

Wards
Ward	Registered Voters
Kibauni	9,976
Masii	18,523
Mbiuni	16,671
Muthetheni	12,571
Mwala/Makutano	17,815
Wamunyu	14,342
Total	89,898
*August 2022.
