= Turkana South Constituency =

Electoral constituency in Kenya

Turkana South
- constituency for the Parliament of Kenya
- Turkana South Constituency within Turkana County

- Turkana County within Kenya
- County: Turkana County
- Population: 153,736
- Area: 7,045 km^{2} (2,720.1 sq mi)

Current constituency
- Party: ODM
- Member: John Ariko Namoit

Turkana South Constituency is an electoral constituency in Kenya. It is one of six constituencies in Turkana County. The constituency was established for the 1963 elections. The constituency has eight wards, all electing councillors to the Turkana County Council.

== Members of Parliament ==
Elections	MP	Party	Notes
1963	George Kamorunyang Ekitella	KANU	
1969	Peter Lobur Ang’elei	KANU	One-party system
1974	Peter Lobur Ang’elei	KANU	One-party system
1979	Peter Lobur Ang’elei	KANU	One-party system.
1983	Peter Lobur Ang’elei	KANU	One-party system.
1988	Peter Lobur Ang’elei	KANU	One-party system.
1992	Francis Ewoton Achuka	KANU	
1997	Francis Ewoton Achuka	KANU	
2002	Francis Ewoton Achuka	KANU	
2007	Josephat Koli Nanok	ODM	
2013	James Ekomwa Lomenen	TNA	
2017	James Ekomwa Lomenen	JP	
2022	John Ariko Namoit	ODM	

== Wards ==
Wards
Ward	Registered Voters
Kapedo	662
Kaputir	2,582
Katilu	6,248
Kochodin	1,284
Lobokat	1,706
Lokichar	8,021
Lokori	4,915
Napeitom	1,234
Kalapata	
Katilia
Total	26,652
*September 2005.
