= Igembe North Constituency =

Kenyan electoral constituency

Igembe North
- constituency for the Parliament of Kenya
- Igembe North Constituency within Meru County

- Meru County within Kenya
- County: Meru
- Population: 154,814 (2012)
- Area: 1,164.6 km^{2} (449.7 sq mi)

Current constituency
- Number of members: 1
- Party: UDA
- Member of Parliament: Julius Taitumu M'anaiba
- Wards: 5

Igembe North Constituency is an electoral constituency in Kenya. It is one of nine constituencies of Meru County. The constituency has five wards, all of which elect councillors for the Nyambene County Council. The constituency was established for the 1988 elections. It was known as Ntonyiri Constituency before the 2007 elections.

Igembe North was one of four constituencies of the former Meru North District. The current Igembe North MP is Julius Taitumu.

== Members of Parliament ==
Elections	MP	Party	Notes
1988	Joseph Muturia	KANU	One-party system.
1992	Richard Maore Maoka	DP	
1997	Richard Maore Maoka	DP	
2002	Richard Maore Maoka	KANU	
2007	Ntoitha M'mithiaru	PNU	
2012	Joseph M'eruaki	TNA	
2017	Richard Maore	JP	
2022	Julius Taitumu M'anaiba	UDA	

== Wards ==
There are 5 wards in Igembe North Constituency: Njia, Igembe East, Athiru Ruujine, Kangeta, and Akirang'ondu. As of 2022, there are 93,434 registered voters in the constituency.

Ward	Registered Voters
Njia	21,810
Igembe East	19,964
Athiru Ruujine	19,920
Kangeta	16,103
Akirang'ondu	15,637
Total	93,434
*As of 2022
