= Japhet Kareke Mbiuki =

Kenyan politician

Japhet Kareke Mbiuki is a Kenyan politician. He belongs to the Kenya African National Union and was elected to represent the Nithi Constituency in the National Assembly of Kenya since the 2007 Kenyan parliamentary election. In his first term In parliament he served as an assistant minister in the ministry of livestock and agriculture. He's credited as the brains behind the introduction of free fertiliser and seedlings to farmers. Between 2012 and 2017 he was reelected back to parliament under The National Alliance party. In the 2017 general election he was overwhelming reelected back to parliament under the Jubilee party and currently serving as chair of parliamentary Committee on National environment.

== Education ==
He holds Bachelors of Arts( B.A ) (Economic) from Kenyatta University.
