= Endarasha =

- Location within Kenya
- Coordinates: 0.28°S 36.78°E
- Country: Kenya
- Province: Nyeri County
- Time zone: UTC+3 (EAT)

Endarasha is a small town in Kenya's former Central Province. It is in Nyeri County, a county created with Kenya's new (2010) constitution, in Kieni West division and 35 km North west of Nyeri town. It is at the foot of the Aberdare ranges and adjacent to the Aberdare National Park. Endarasha is 2416m above sea level and (0 37E).

Found here is Aberdare Village House Located in the middle of Endarasha settlement scheme, which is an extended small scale farming area on the slopes of the Aberdares Mountain, with approximate over 100,000 acres, and more than 8,000 families living in the area, extending to the foot of Mt. Kenya.

The main town in the area is Nyeri Town, formerly a market center for European-ex-pat highlands farmers, now a busy commercial and industrial center and the starting-off point for Aberdare National Park.

== Climate ==
Cool, temperate climate most of the year.

== Health ==
A local government clinic is in the town.

== Education ==
Endarasha Boy's High School is there.

The school is constructed next to the Endarasha township, along the Mweiga-Watuka road (all weather gravel finish road). Its also surrounded by fairly densely populated villages on all sides.

== Tourism ==
Its cemetery attracts visitors to the graves of the famous author and hunter of man-eaters, Jim Corbett, and of founder of the boy Scouts, Robert Baden-Powell, who spent the last years of his life in the cottage on the grounds of the nearby Outspan Hotel, and who once said, "Nearer to Nyeri, nearer to heaven".

== Agriculture ==
Endarasha is surrounded by land ideal for agriculture. Amongst the products from the region are Irish potatoes, cabbage, maize, beans, wheat and bulb onions. Dairy products are also produced.

Due to the area's heavy focus on agriculture, most individuals find themselves preoccupied with farm upkeep, leaving them with little free time.
