= Paul Wainaina =

Kenyan academic and former Vice-Chancellor of Kenyatta University

Vice Chancellor of Africa University
- Appointed by: African visiting Scholar Award

Personal details
- Born: 1950 (age 75–76) Bahati, Nakuru, Colony and Protectorate of Kenya
- Education: university of Alberta
- Occupation: Academician; Professor

Paul Kuria Wainaina (born 1950) is a Kenyan professor of philosophy studies from the University of Alberta who served as the vice chancellor of Kenyatta university.

== Early life and education ==
Paul Wainaina was born in Bahati, Nakuru in 1950. He earned a Master's degree in Philosophy Education from the University of Nairobi and his doctoral degree in philosophy of education from the University of Alberta in Canada.

== Career ==
Before joining Kenyatta University he was a primary school teacher. He served as an external examiner at the University of Pretoria in South Africa, at Midlands State University in Zimbabwe, at the University of Botswana and at the University of Switzerland among others. He also was holder of the African visiting Scholar Award, by the association of African universities

== See also ==
- Kenyatta University
- Alberta
- Chancellor
