= Lucas Chepkitony =

Kenyan politician

Chepkitony Lucas Kipkosgei is a Kenyan politician. He belongs to the Orange Democratic Movement and was elected to represent the Keiyo North Constituency in the National Assembly of Kenya since the 2002 Kenyan parliamentary election.
