= Rongai Constituency =

Kenyan electoral constituency

Rongai
- constituency for the Parliament of Kenya
- Rongai Constituency within Nakuru County

- Nakuru County within Kenya
- County: Nakuru
- Population: 199906
- Area: 1,198 km^{2} (462.6 sq mi)

Current constituency
- Number of members: 1
- Party: UDA
- Member of Parliament: Paul Chebor
- Wards: 5

Rongai Constituency is an electoral constituency in Kenya. It is one of eleven constituencies in Nakuru County. The constituency has eight wards, all electing Members of County Assembly (MCAs) for the Nakuru County Assembly. The constituency was established for the 1988 elections when it was carved out of Nakuru North Constituency (now Subukia Constituency).

The constituency had a population of 199,906 according to the 2019 census.

The first Rongai MP, previously representing Nakuru North, is a brother-in-law of the then Kenyan president Daniel arap Moi.

== Members of Parliament ==
Elections	MP	Party	Notes
1988	Eric Kibet Koras Bomett	KANU	One-party system.
1992	William K. Komen	KANU	
1997	Eric Toroitich Morogo	KANU	
2002	Alicen Chelaite	NARC	Chelaite was also the first woman to serve as Mayor of Nakuru from 1996 to 1997.
2007	Luka Kigen	ODM	
2013	Raymond Moi	KANU	Son of former President Daniel arap Moi and former First Lady Lena Moi
2017	Raymond Moi	KANU	
2022	Paul Mamba Chebor	UDA	United Democratic Alliance

== Locations and wards ==
Locations
Location	Population*
Boror	13,753
Kampi ya Moto	23,436
Lenginet	21,770
Maji Tamu	13,881
Makongeni	19,746
Ngata	17,910
Rongai	20,268
Solai	35,949
Waseges	29,722
Total	x
1999 census.

Wards
Ward	Registered Voters
Boror	4,114
Kampi ya Moto	6,257
Maji Tamu	3,827
Makongeni	5,598
Ngata	5,194
Rongai	13,095
Solai	4,089
Waseges	8,688
Total	50,862
*September 2005.
