= Ababu Namwamba =

Kenyan Politician from Budalangi

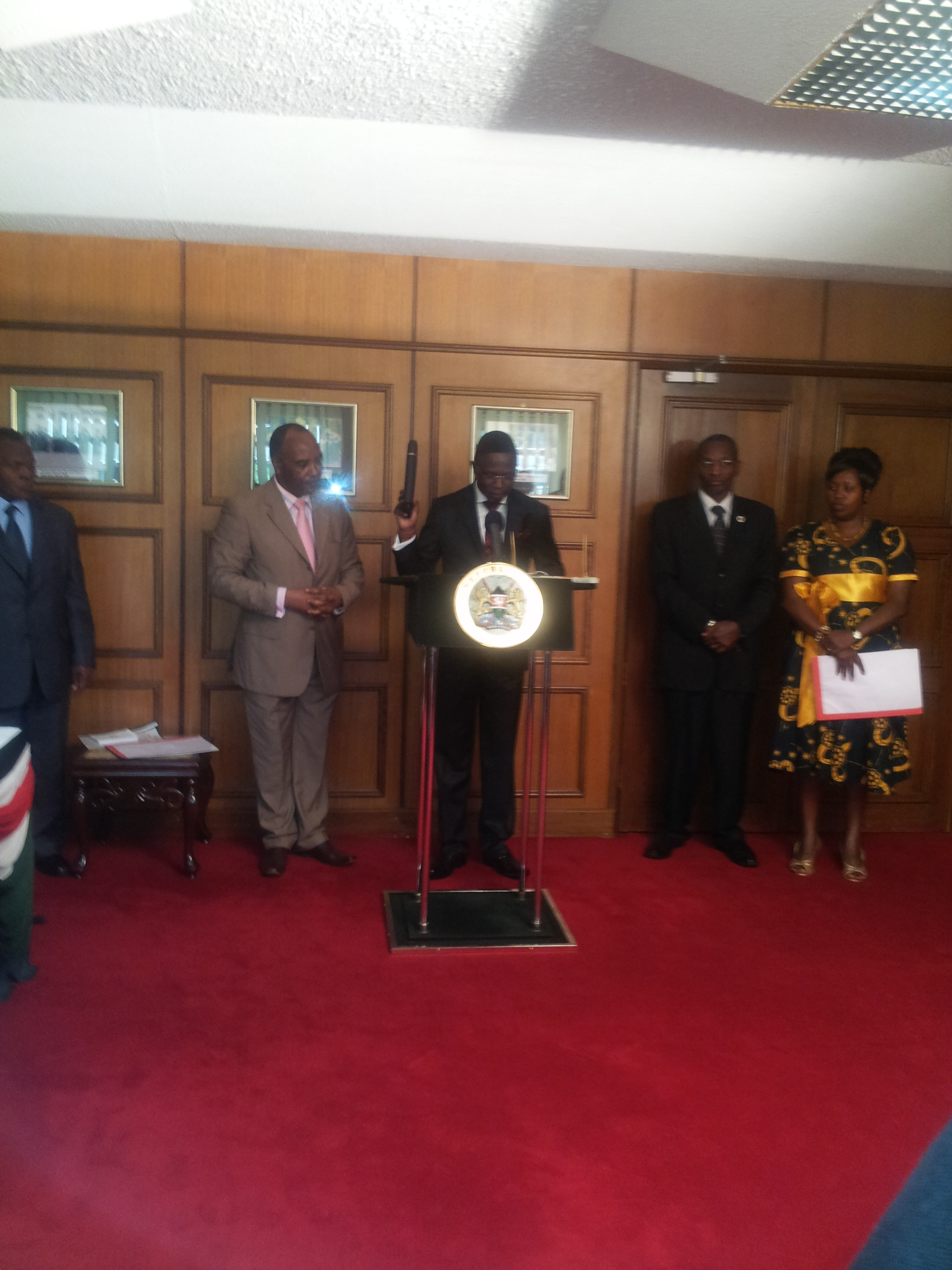
Hon. Ababu Namwamba taking the oath of office as Minister for Sports and Youth Affairs before President Mwai Kibaki at Harambee House, Nairobi

Ababu Tawfiq Pius Namwamba E.G.H. is a Kenyan politician and former Cabinet Secretary for Youth Affairs, Sports and the Arts, having been appointed by President William Ruto. He is an international lawyer trained in Nairobi and Washington, DC. Since 2016 he has been the leader of the Labour Party of Kenya. Namwamba is also the immediate Former Chief Administrative Secretary of the Ministry of Foreign Affairs of the Republic of Kenya. He serves as Kenya's High Commissioner to the Republic of Uganda, having been appointed by Ruto on January 21, 2026. Prior to this appointment, Namwamba was serving as Kenya's Permanent Representative to UNEP.

== Biography ==
Ababu Namwamba was born in Jinja, Uganda to Kenyan parents on 23 December 1975, and raised in Uganda and later Kenya.

=== Legal practice ===
Ababu Namwamba holds a Bachelor of Laws degree from the University of Nairobi and a Master of Laws degree in International Law from American University Washington College of Law. Before his election to Parliament in 2007 on his first attempt, he had served as a public interest attorney and advocate for accountable government. He was Chief Counsel at The Chambers of Justice, a public interest trust he founded in 2002 and ran alongside his law firm, Ababu Namwamba Attorneys-at-Law.

In 2004 he won a landmark legal battle in which his client, a Kenyan-born Pakistani, had been wrongfully accused of terrorism. It was the first case of its kind in Kenya.

In 2003, he secured a historic ruling in a constitutional case that affirmed the right of children living with HIV/AIDS to attend public schools unfettered. He filed the case for Chambers of Justice and Nyumbani Children's Home after two schools in Ngong’ and Karen barred children from Nyumbani for their HIV status. This case won him the 2004 Global Justice Award which he received in Amsterdam, Netherlands. He was inducted onto the roll of Young Global Leaders by the World Economic Forum in 2009.

From 2004 to 2005, as counsel for Swiss national Marianne Brynner, Namwamba played a central role in the last probe into the death of former Kenyan Foreign Affairs Minister Dr. Robert Ouko.

Namwamba was also active in international lobbying at this time, advocating for international human rights, fair trade practices and debt relief for Africa through platforms like the World Social Forum in Mumbai, India and Porto Alegre, Brazil. Locally, he pressed for responsible governance through the "After the Promise" annual governance report card. He was also a regular columnist with the Sunday Nation and later Standard on Sunday, Kenya's top two newspapers, where he wrote weekly political analysis for over five years.

=== Community service ===
In 2003, he initiated the Ababu Namwamba Foundation, a charity that supports education, talent growth and economic empowerment for hundreds of young Kenyans. He calls the foundation his ‘payback’ to Kenya, himself a beneficiary of a Jomo Kenyatta Foundation scholarship in high school. The foundation offers scholarships to bright students from economically challenged backgrounds, runs a mentorship program for students, supports development of sporting talents and works with women and youth groups on income-generating activities.

=== Political career ===
Namwamba was first elected to parliament in the 2007 Kenyan parliamentary election as a member of the Orange Democratic Movement (ODM), representing Budalang'i Constituency in the National Assembly of Kenya. He was Parliamentary Secretary of the ODM from 2008 to 2013, and served as Minister for Sports and Youth Affairs from 2012 until the ODM lost office in the 2013 election.

In 2016, Namwamba quit ODM where he was serving as secretary general. He felt that Raila Odinga, the party leader who had stood for the presidency twice, was no longer capable of convincing voters to support him. He joined the newly relaunched Labour Party of Kenya, and since September 2016 he has been the leader of the Labour Party. In March 2017 the Labour Party announced that it would support the presidential candidacy of Uhuru Kenyatta in the election of August 2017. Namwamba lost his Budalang'i seat in that election.

In January 2018, Namwamba was nominated to the position of Chief Administrative Secretary in the Ministry of Foreign Affairs and was sworn into office in March 2018.

== Personal life ==
Namwamba is a supporter of English Premier League club Arsenal F.C..
