= Butula Constituency =

Electoral constituency of Kenya

Butula
- constituency for the Parliament of Kenya
- Butula Constituency within Busia County

- Busia County within Kenya
- County: Busia
- Population: 140,334
- Area: 247 km^{2} (95.4 sq mi)

Current constituency
- Number of members: 1
- Party: ODM
- Member of Parliament: Joseph Maelo Oyula
- Wards: 6

Butula Constituency is an electoral constituency in Kenya. It is one of seven constituencies in Busia County. The constituency was established for the 1997 elections. The constituency has six wards, all electing members of county assembly(MCA) for the Busia County government. The current member of parliament is Joseph Maero Oyula.

== Members of Parliament ==
Elections	MP	Party	Notes
1997	Francis. O. Masakhalia	KANU	
2002	Christine Abungu Mango	NARC	
2007	Alfred Odhiambo	ODM	
2013	Michael Onyura Aringo	FPK	
2017; 2022	Joseph Maero Oyula	ODM	

== Wards ==
Ward	Registered Voters
Marachi Central	10,301
Marachi East	9,547
Marachi North	10,827
Marachi West	10,050
ELUGULU	11,732
KINGANDOLE	8,232
Total	57,685
*September 2005.

== Point of interest ==
In Butula or near the boundaries of the neighbourhood, there are some points of interest, these include the following:

- Butula Mission Hospital, a missionary hospital
- Butula Boys High School
- The Postal Office
- The Butula Resort
- Butula Polytechnic
- Butula Girls High School
