= Evans Akula =

Kenyan politician

Evans Akula is a Kenyan politician. He belongs to the Orange Democratic Movement and was elected to represent the Khwisero Constituency in the National Assembly of Kenya since the 2007 Kenyan parliamentary election.
