= Joseph Kamotho =

Kenyan politician (1942–2014)

John Joseph Kamotho (5 December 1942 – 6 December 2014) was a Kenyan politician. He held many Cabinet portfolios including Education, Trade, and Environment and Natural Resources. Kamotho was a former member of parliament for Mathioya Constituency and Kangema Constituency.

== Early life and education ==
Kamotho was born on 5 December 1942 in Gacharageini village in Fort Hall District. He joined the Muthangari Primary School in Fort Hall in 1948 and sat for CE in 1952. He later joined Njumbi Intermediate School in 1955. In 1958, he sat the Kenya African Preliminary Examination and was admitted to Nyeri High School. He sat for the Cambridge Secondary Education Examination in 1962 and obtained a Division Two.

He worked for the East African Customs and Excise as a trainee customs officer in Mombasa and later joined Standard Chartered Bank. He applied for a Russian scholarship and joined the Moscow State University in 1964 where he studied economics but quit a year later. He later got a scholarship from the Institute for International Education, which enabled him to study at Syracuse University in the US and obtained a degree in liberal arts.

After finishing his first degree in 1968, he returned to Kenya to teach at the Kenya Institute of Administration. In 1969, he went to study at the University of Birmingham and obtained a master's degree in Development Administration and Social Sciences.

== Political career ==
He was the fifth secretary general of the KANU party from 1989 to 2003.

He retired from active politics after the 2007 elections.

In the 2013 general elections, Kamotho ran for the Muranga Senatorial seat but lost to Kembi Gitura.

== Personal life ==
In March 2013, Kamotho was admitted to Nairobi Hospital for three months. Kamotho's family later flew him to South Africa where he underwent intensive treatment. On 6 December 2014 at the age of 72 at Milpark Hospital in Johannesburg, South Africa, Kamotho suffered from cardiac arrest and was pronounced dead. He is survived by his wife Eunice Wambui Kamotho and four children. He was buried on 17 December near his home in Mioro, Murang’a.

JJ, as he was fondly known, is remembered for his assertive public stance in Kenyan politics during the 1990s.
