= Peter Munya =

Kenyan politician

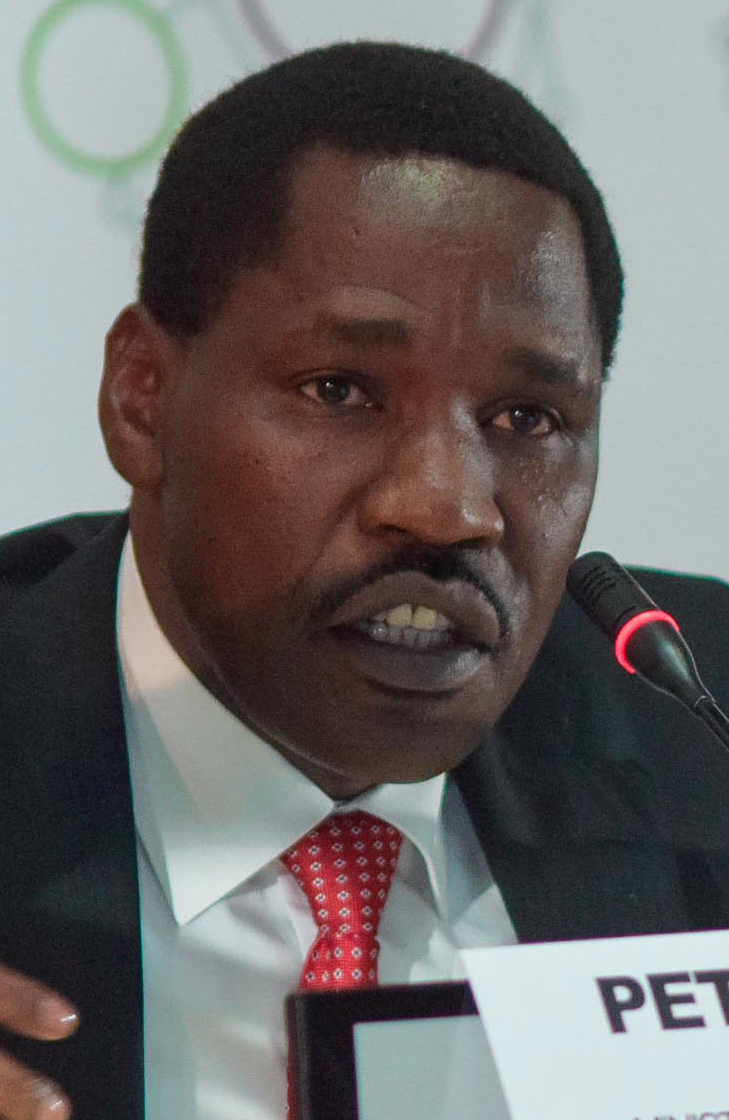
- Peter Munya in 2018

Cabinet Secretary, Ministry of Agriculture
- Incumbent
- Assumed office 14 January 2020

Cabinet Secretary, Ministry of Industry, Trade and Cooperatives
- In office 13 July 2018 – 14 January 2020

Cabinet Secretary, East African Community and Northern Corridor Development
- In office 16 February 2018 – 13 July 2018

1st Governor of Meru County
- In office 27 March 2013 – 18 August 2017

Assistant Minister of East African Community
- In office April 2008 – March 2013

Assistant Minister of Internal Security and Provincial Administration
- In office October 2006 – December 2007

Member of the Kenyan Parliament
- In office 2003–2013
- Constituency: Tigania East

Personal details
- Born: 1969 (age 56–57) Muthaara, Meru County, Kenya
- Party: PNU
- Spouse: Phoebe Munya
- Children: Karauni; Nkio; Tiania
- Education: University of Nairobi (LLB); University of Brussels (LLM); University of Georgia (LLM)
- Profession: Advocate
- Positions: Lecturer, Moi University (2000-02)
- Website: www.petermunya.co.ke

Peter Gatirau Munya (born 1969) is the immediate former Cabinet Secretary of Kenya's Ministry of Agriculture. He took over the ministry on 14 January 2020 after being transferred from the Ministry of Trade and Industrialization. He also served in the same capacity in the ministry of East African Community and Northern Corridor Development.

He is a politician who served as the first governor of Meru County, and as the second Chairman of the Council of Governors. He was, until his appointment as a Cabinet Secretary, the Party of National Unity (PNU) Leader. He also served as the 2nd Member of Parliament for Tigania East Constituency, Meru County in Central Kenya.

== Early life ==
The son of Jackson Munya M'Rukunga and Grace Mwakithi, he was born and raised in Muthaara, Meru County.

== Governor Meru County ==
Peter Munya served as the governor of Meru County from 27 March 2013 to 18 August 2017, having won the elections of March 2013 narrowly against the Educationist Kilemi Mwiria. His term as governor was bogged down by a petition against his win at the Meru High Court and constant wrangles with sitting area MPs who accused him of being a lone ranger and stood with his challenger throughout the electoral petition. As Meru Governor, Munya was credited with running the best up country fire department in the country, second only to the County of Mombasa's.

He was also acclaimed for coming up with major firsts, among them establishing the MCIDC, a corporation through which the county was to invest in sectors that would provide stable market to the local farming community, provide employment to the county's youth, provide vital services to the local business community, and generate revenue for the county government.

== Education ==
Munya sat for and passed his ‘O’ Levels at Chogoria Boys High School, and proceeded to Meru School for his ‘A’ levels. At Meru School, he was the Chairman of the Debating Club and a winner of the Provincial Public Speaking Competition.

In 1993 he graduated with a Bachelor of Law degree (LLB 2nd class Hons Lower Division) from the University of Nairobi. At the University of Nairobi, Munya was twice elected, in 1992 and 1993, chair of the Kenya Law Students Society (KLLS). Upon graduation, he took up internship at Kamau Kuria and Kiraitu Advocates in Nairobi.

In January 1995 he went on to the University of Brussels, Belgium, on a Belgian Embassy scholarship. He undertook and attained a master's degree in International Law (International Economic Integration Law). He proceeded to the University of Georgia where he attained a second master's degree in law (Public International Law).

In 1997 he was published in the Boston University International Law Journal, under the title "The Role of the Organization of African Unity in Conflict Resolution and Dispute Settlement in Africa".

Upon his return to Kenya, he took a job as a Law lecturer at the Kenya School of Professional Studies (KSPS) and Kenya School of Monetary Studies (KSMS).

In 2000 he was appointed a lecturer of law at Moi University, Eldoret. He was published in the Moi University Journal in 2002 under the title "The Role of the International Court of Justice in Resolving African Disputes: Past, Present and Future Prospects".

In 2002 he left Moi University to set up Kimaiyo and Munya Advocates.

== Member of Parliament, Tigania East Constituency ==
In 2002 Munya campaigned for and won the Tigania East parliamentary seat in the then Meru North District. He was subsequently sworn into the 9th Kenyan Parliament on 9 January 2003.

In the 9th Parliament, Munya founded and chaired Kenya Young Parliamentarians Association with the aim of championing in Parliament issues affecting Kenya youth. He was also a member of the Health Club Management committee and the Parliamentary Investment Committee (PIC) before his appointment to the government in 2006 as the Assistant Minister, Ministry of Internal Security and Provincial Administration, where he called for stronger laws to curb small arms proliferation.

In December 2007 Munya was elected for a second consecutive term as the representative for his Tigania East Constituency, and appointed the Assistant Minister, East African Community, where he called for expansion of roads, improvement of existing harbours and building of new ports.

== Electoral petition ==
In the 2013 general elections, Munya was elected Meru County Governor on the APK ticket under the Jubilee Coalition, but his election was nullified by the Court of Appeal in Nyeri on 12 March 2014. He appealed this ruling at the Supreme Court of Kenya in Nairobi. The Supreme Court quashed the earlier ruling on 31 May 2014, stating that the burden of proof lay on the petitioners, and reinstated him as Governor of Meru.

== Chair Council of Governors ==
In May 2015 Munya was elected the chairman of the Council of Governors through consensus.

In May 2016 he was reelected the Council of Governors' chair and vowed to fight for devolution. As the chair, he launched the Devolution Torch, a platform with the sole responsibility of providing opportunity for citizens to share experiences on the success of devolution in Kenya.

== Party leader, Party of National Unity ==
In October 2016, Munya was elected the leader of the Party of National Unity at the party's National Delegates Conference in Nairobi. At the conference, PNU also resolved to field candidates in every elective post in the year 2017 elections, except president. During the 8 August 2017 election, Munya was defending his gubernatorial seat against his rival, former Meru County Senator, Kiraitu Murungi. He subsequently lost to Murungi, who garnered 281,737 votes, against Munya, who garnered 232,569.

== 2018 poll loss and appointment to the cabinet ==
Following the disputed 2017 presidential elections where the Supreme Court declared the presidential elections null and void, Munya, suspecting mischief in his poll loss to former ally turned bitter foe Kiraitu Murungi, launched a poll petition challenging his loss. He shifted his political direction from majority Jubilee Party where PNU was an affiliate party, to National Supper Alliance (NASA) led by 1st petitioner of the presidential election Raila Odinga.

He soon made an about turn after a meeting between him and his party leadership and the President Uhuru Kenyatta, who later appointed him to his cabinet.
