= Korossy =

Korossy is a Hungarian surname. Some variations of the spelling of this surname are as follows: Kőrösi, Kőrösy, Kőrössi, Kőrössy, Körösi, Körösy, Körössi, Körössy, Korosi, Korosy, Korossi, Korossy and Grorossi.

The surname appears to be based on the Hungarian word körös. By definition, the word means round/circular. Geographically, it is the name of a river (Körös) as well as the Hungarian name of the town of Križevci, Croatia. In addition, the Hungarian towns of Kiskőrös and Nagykőrös are often commonly referred to as Kőrös – as "ő" is simply the long variant of "ö" with the difference being almost negligible.

Following Hungarian grammar rules, the addition of the letter "i" to the end of some words implies a belonging, hence the word "Körösi" would translate to "of/from Körös".

In the late Middle Ages, it was common for Hungarian noble families with names derived in a similar way from a toponym to spell their names with "y" at the end instead of "i", and/or with a doubled consonant before it. Thus was the surname Körösi changed to Körösy / Körössi / Körössy by some families. Later the name has also been anglicized, by dropping the diacritics from the letters "ö" and "ő", by families migrating to countries where the alphabet did not support these letters.

Notable people with the surname include:

- Anita Potocskáné Kőrösi (1981–), Hungarian politician
- Csaba Kőrösi (1958–), Hungarian diplomat
- Albert Kálmán Kőrössy (1869–1955), Hungarian architect
- János Kőrössy (1926–2013), Romanian jazz musician
- Joseph Körösi (1811–1868), Hungarian-born Austrian industrialist
- Sándor Kőrösi Csoma
