= Kilemi Mwiria =

Kenyan politician

Dr Mwiria Valerian Kilemi (born May 17, 1954) is a Kenyan politician and scholar. He belongs to the Maendeleo Chap Chap party headed by Machakos Governor Alfred Mutua and was elected to represent the Tigania West Constituency in the National Assembly of Kenya in the 2007 Kenyan parliamentary election.

In 2012, he contested and lost the Meru County gubernatorial seat to Peter Munya, in a disputed election that was unsuccessfully challenged in court. At the moment, he is the presidential advisor on education. He has also contested for Member of Parliament, Tigania west, in the 2022 elections and lost. His most notable achievements has been the chairing of the task force mandated to review the secondary school fees structure. This has been lauded by parents and the general public at large.

== Early life ==
Kilemi Mwiria was born in Miciimikuru, Tigania, Meru County (formerly part of Meru North District), Kenya, into a humble rural family of peasant farmers. His parents were Joseph M’Lithira and Elizabeth Ngoki, who worked as subsistence farmers. His upbringing was modest — growing up in a rural village with limited resources shaped his lifelong focus on education and community development.

== Education ==
Mwiria began his education at Muthara Primary School, where he reportedly walked long distances barefoot to attend classes — an early sign of determination and resilience.

His academic ability became evident during his secondary education at Miathene High School and later Kangaru High School, where he distinguished himself as a bright and disciplined student.

His performance earned him admission to the University of Nairobi, where he completed a Bachelor of Arts degree.

He secured international academic opportunities, obtaining a Master’s degree in Comparative Education from the University of Chicago and later a Ph.D. in International Education from Stanford University.

== Early career ==
Kilemi Mwiria began his career in education as a high school teacher, serving from 1975 to 1985. During this period, he gained experience in classroom teaching and developed an interest in education policy and reform.

In 1985, he joined Kenyatta University as a Senior Research Fellow at the Bureau of Educational Research, where he worked until 1993. His research focused on education systems, policy development, and the role of higher education in national development. During his time at the university, Mwiria became involved in academic staff advocacy, including efforts to push for the registration of a lecturers’ union and improved working conditions for university staff.

These activities took place during the presidency of Daniel Arap Moi, a period marked by tight government control over public institutions, including universities. Advocacy for labour organization and academic rights often attracted state scrutiny, and a number of academics faced disciplinary action or political pressure.

Amid this environment, Mwiria left Kenya in the early 1990s and relocated to South Africa. From 1994 to 1995, he worked as a Senior Researcher in the Education Policy Unit at the University of the Witwatersrand, where he contributed to research on education policy during the country’s transition from apartheid.

Kilemi Mwiria served as a member of the Bureau of African Ministers of Education and the Association for the Development of Education in Africa (ADEA) from 2003 to 2005. In this capacity, he participated in high-level policy discussions and coordination efforts aimed at improving education systems across Africa. The Bureau, which brings together education ministers and senior policymakers, works closely with ADEA to promote policy dialogue, share best practices, and support education sector reforms among member states. During his tenure, Mwiria contributed to initiatives focused on strengthening higher education, improving access and quality in basic education, and aligning national education strategies with broader continental development goals. His role involved engagement with governments, development partners, and research institutions in advancing collaborative approaches to education planning and reform across the region.

Kilemi Mwiria has had extensive international academic and professional engagement, including links to Germany. He collaborated with the UNESCO Institute for Education (now the UNESCO Institute for Lifelong Learning) in Hamburg, contributing to research on adult literacy and education policy. During a period in the early 1990s when he was outside Kenya, Mwiria established and operated a consultancy firm, KimKam, in Berlin, through which he provided advisory services on higher education and education reform. In this capacity, he worked with governments and international organizations, including agencies of the United Nations, on policy development and sector analysis. These engagements formed part of a broader international career that complemented his academic background, which includes doctoral studies at Stanford University, and positioned him within global education policy networks.

== Political Career ==
=== Member of Parliament Tigania West Constituency ===
Kilemi Mwiria served as MP for Tigania West after being elected in the 2002 general election, and he held the seat for two consecutive terms (2003–2013). Much of Mwiria’s political identity was tied to infrastructure and education development in the constituency. His key areas of development are;

==== 1. Roads and transport ====
In collaboration with the Kenya Rural Roads Authority, he supported the construction and upgrading of key transport corridors within the constituency. Notable among these was the Kirindine–Miathene–Mikinduri Road, which enhanced connectivity between rural areas and market centers, facilitating trade and mobility.

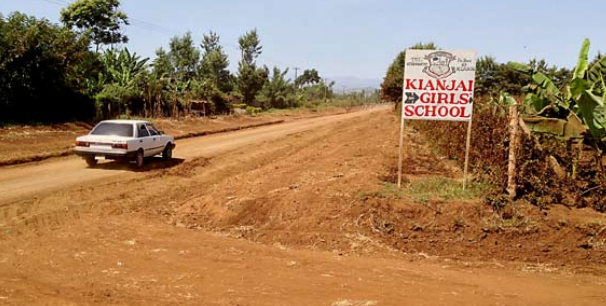

==== 2.Water development ====
Mwiria oversaw the establishment and expansion of several water supply projects aimed at addressing chronic water scarcity in Tigania West. These included the Kitheo Water Project, the Tigania Water Project (valued at approximately KSh 250 million), and the Kauo Limauru Water Project, which improved access to clean water for households and agricultural use.

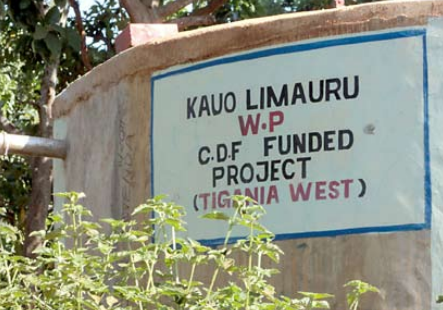

==== 3. Bridges and rural access ====
To complement road development and improve year-round accessibility, his tenure saw the construction of multiple bridges and river crossings, including the Baimau Bridge. These projects helped reduce seasonal isolation of communities, particularly during rainy periods.

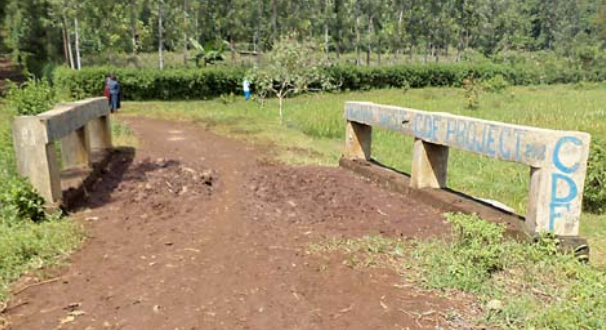

==== 4.Security and administrative infrastructure ====
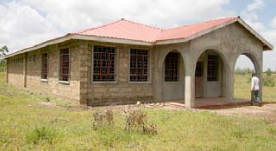

Mwiria also supported the expansion of security infrastructure within the constituency through the establishment of police posts and administrative units. Notable examples include the Mituntu Police Post, which contributed to improved local security and government presence in previously underserved areas

=== Assistant Minister of Higher Education ===
Kilemi Mwiria served as Assistant Minister for Higher Education, Science and Technology from 2003 to 2013 under Mwai Kibaki, during a period of rapid expansion in Kenya’s education sector. He played a key role in supporting policies that led to the establishment and upgrading of institutions such as Meru University of Science and Technology and the growth of Meru National Polytechnic, while also being widely credited with spearheading the establishment of Karumo Technical Training Institute. His contributions focused on expanding access to higher and technical education, especially in underserved regions, strengthening institutional capacity, and increasing opportunities for young people through both university and vocational training pathways.

Some of Kilemi Mwiria's major achievements as Assistant Minister of Higher Education are:

1. Contributing to the policy framework that enabled the establishment of Meru University of Science and Technology. He supported the government’s expansion of higher education through the creation of new university colleges, under which Meru University College of Science and Technology was founded in 2009 as a constituent college of Jomo Kenyatta University of Agriculture and Technology. During his tenure, he was also part of the ministry leadership that oversaw the institution’s development phase, including infrastructure growth and academic expansion, and remained in office through its transition to a fully chartered university in 2013, when it attained independent status as Meru University of Science and Technology.
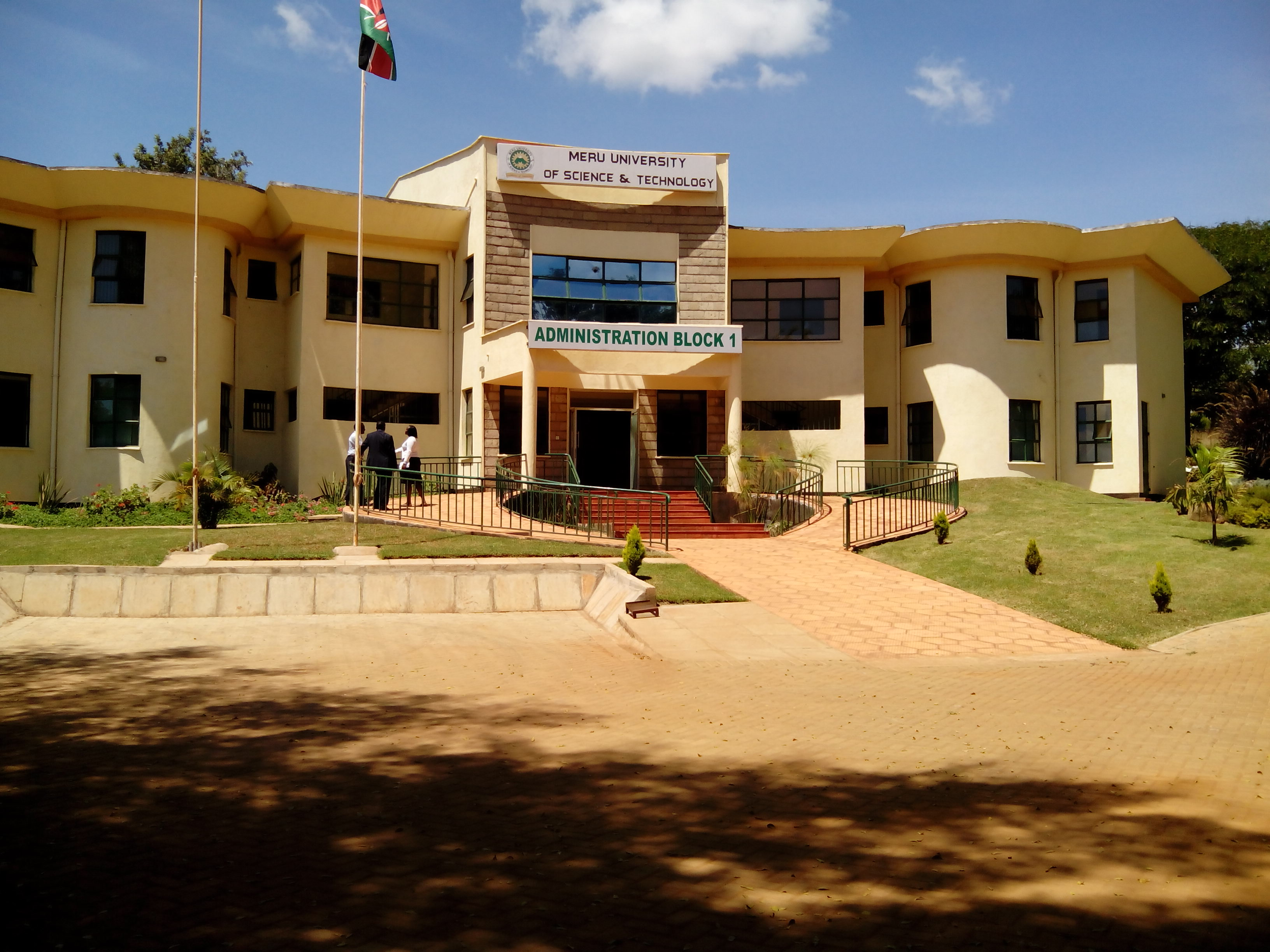
  Meru University of Science and Technology
2. He played a direct role in the establishment of Karumo Technical Training Institute during his tenure as Assistant Minister for Higher Education, Science and Technology (2008–2013) under Mwai Kibaki. He spearheaded the creation of the institution as part of efforts to expand access to technical and vocational education in the Meru region, overseeing its founding, development, and initial operationalization. The institute was established to provide practical skills training and increase opportunities for youth in technical fields, reflecting his broader focus on decentralizing education and strengthening vocational training alongside university expansion.
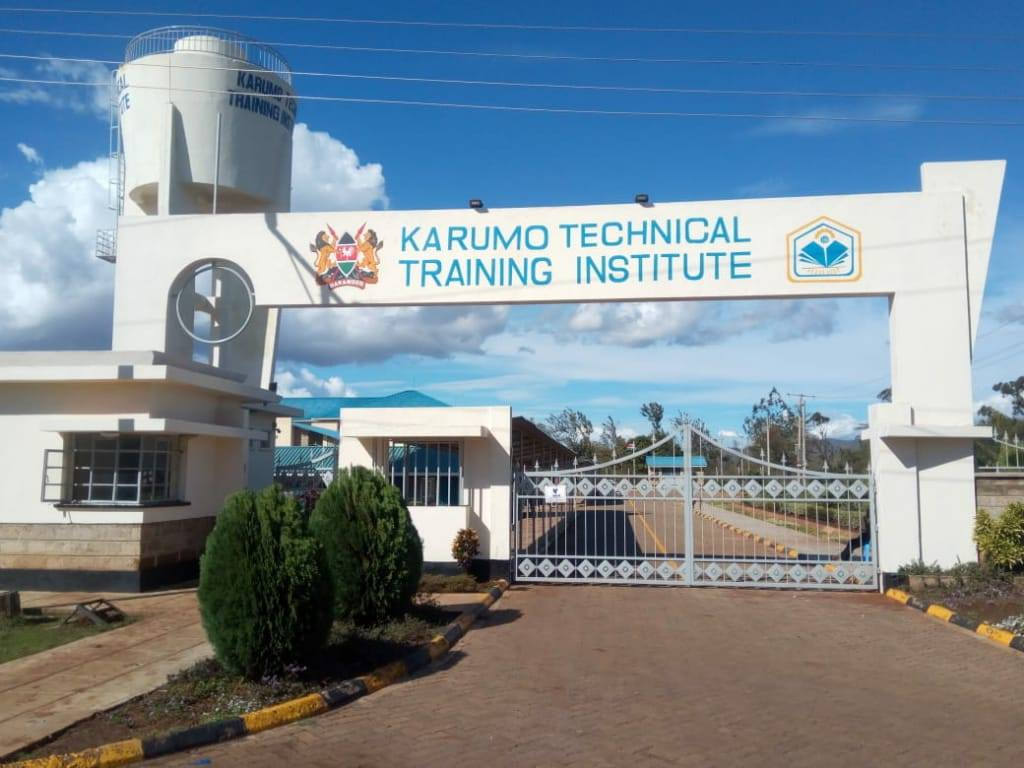
  Karumo Technical Training Institute Gate
3. The expansion and strengthening of Meru National Polytechnic. As part of the government’s broader push to enhance technical and vocational education, he supported institutional development, capacity expansion, and increased access to skills-based training. His tenure saw the growth of the polytechnic’s infrastructure, programmes, and student enrolment, aligning with national efforts to elevate technical institutions to meet rising demand for practical and industry-relevant education.
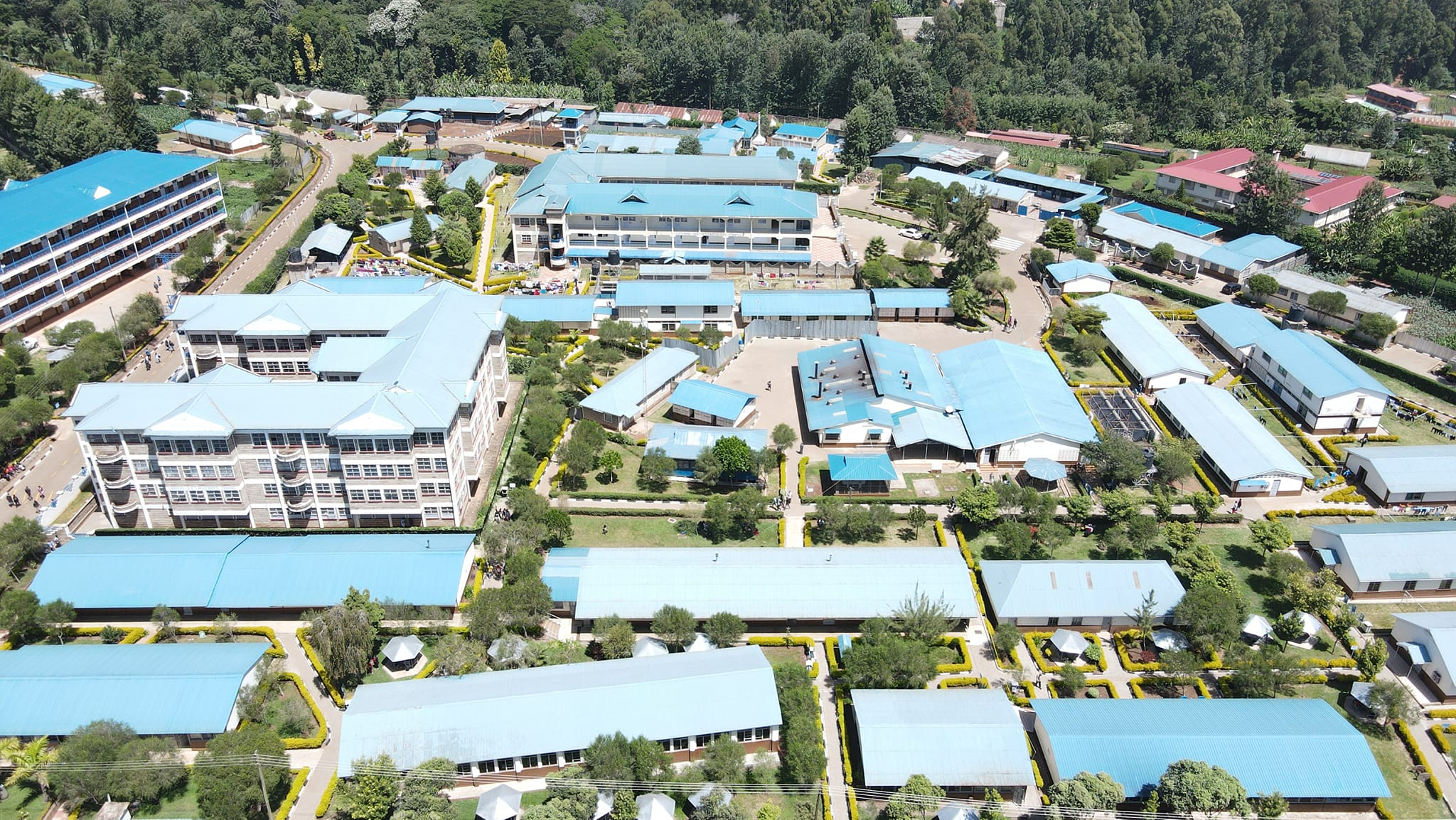
  Meru National Polytechnic
4. During his tenure as Assistant Minister for Higher Education, Kilemi Mwiria played a significant role in expanding access to international education opportunities for Kenyan students. He actively supported and facilitated scholarship programs by strengthening partnerships between the government and foreign institutions, helping many qualified but financially disadvantaged students secure placements and funding to study abroad. His efforts contributed to widening academic exposure and building human capital, as numerous beneficiaries went on to gain global skills and expertise that have since supported national development.
5. Working alongside George Saitoti, Kilemi Mwiria also played a key role in advancing the implementation of free primary education, driving the initiative with notable commitment and urgency. Their efforts helped boost enrollment of eligible students to around 80%, significantly expanding access to basic education. This surge in enrollment created a stronger pipeline of students progressing through the education system, ultimately contributing to a marked increase in the number of learners transitioning to tertiary institutions in subsequent years.
6. Kilemi Mwiria advanced a strong pro-poor agenda centered on expanding equitable access to education and opportunity. Among his notable policy positions was the “one family, one graduate and at least one employee” approach, which sought to ensure that every household could attain a minimum level of educational and economic empowerment. He complemented this with advocacy for bursaries and scholarships targeted at the neediest, affirmative action to enable students from disadvantaged backgrounds to access top schools and competitive university programs, and support for employment opportunities for graduates from marginalized regions, as well as for girls and women. He also promoted bringing universities closer to communities to reduce costs and widen access, a stance that often put him at odds with those who equated privilege with merit.

=== Gubernatorial Race 2013 ===
In the 4 March 2013 gubernatorial election in Meru County, Kilemi Mwiria of The National Alliance (TNA) garnered 180,837 votes, narrowly losing to Peter Munya of the Alliance Party of Kenya (APK), who received 184,273 votes and was elected as the county’s first governor. Mwiria subsequently challenged the results in court, citing alleged irregularities. The High Court initially dismissed the petition; however, on appeal, the Court of Appeal annulled the election. Munya later appealed to the Supreme Court, which overturned the annulment and upheld his election.

Kilemi Mwiria also contested for the governorship of Meru County in the 2017 general election, but was defeated by Kiraitu Murungi, with Peter Munya also among the candidates.
