= Aden Sugow =

Kenyan politician

Aden Ahmed Sugow

Member of Parliament for Fafi Constituency
- In office 2002–2013
- President: Mwai Kibaki

Assistant Minister for Water and Irrigation
- In office 2004–2008

Assistant Minister for Public Service
- In office 2008–2013

Personal details
- Born: Garissa County, Kenya
- Party: Kenya African National Union (Former); Orange Democratic Movement (Former)
- Spouse: Three wives
- Children: 13
- Parent: Senior Chief Sugow Ahmed (father)
- Education: Bura Primary School; Nairobi School
- Alma mater: Jomo Kenyatta University of Agriculture and Technology (Executive MBA)
- Occupation: Politician, Businessman

Military service
- Allegiance: Kenya
- Branch/service: Kenya Defence Forces
- Years of service: 1981–1997
- Rank: Major
- Other service: United Nations Diplomat in Iran and Iraq

Aden Sugow Ahmed is a Kenyan politician and a leading businessman from Garissa County. He belonged to the Kenya African National Union and later the Orange Democratic Movement. He was elected Member of Parliament for Fafi Constituency in Garissa County in 2002 and served until 2013. He was appointed Assistant Minister for Water and Irrigation in 2004 and was in 2008 transferred to the Ministry of Public Service as an Assistant Minister.

Aden Sugow is the Son of prominent and then powerful colonial Chief Senior Chief Sugow Ahmed. The Sugow family is one of the most prominent families in Northern Kenya.

With regards to marriage, Aden Sugow has followed in his polygamous father's footsteps and is thus married to three wives and is a father to 13 children.

Aden Sugow attend Bura Primary school and then later attended Nairobi School for his secondary education. He is a trained military pilot. He has a diploma in aeronautical engineering and a postgraduate diploma in military intelligence and International Security. He also has attained an executive MBA from the Jomo Kenyatta University of Science and Technology.

Sugow joined the military in 1981 as a cadet and rose through the ranks to the level of Major. He also served in the UN as a diplomat in Iran and Iraq. He retired from the military in 1997 and joined active politics. He was elected as Member of Parliament for the first time in 2002. Despite being a freshman, he was immediately appointed Assistant Minister in the newly formed Narc government under Mwai Kibaki.
