= Molo Constituency =

Electoral constituency in Kenya

Molo
- constituency for the Parliament of Kenya
- Molo Constituency within Nakuru County

- Nakuru County within Kenya
- County: Nakuru
- Population: 156,732
- Area: 483 km^{2} (186.5 sq mi)

Current constituency
- Number of members: 1
- Party: UDA
- Member of Parliament: Francis Kuria Kimani
- Wards: 4

Molo Constituency is an electoral constituency in Kenya. It is one of eleven constituencies in Nakuru County. The constituency was established for the 1988 elections, renamed from the former Nakuru West Constituency.

== Members of Parliament ==
Elections	MP	Party	Notes
1988	John Njenga Mungai	KANU	
1992	John Njenga Mungai	Ford-Asili	
1997	Dixon Kihika Kimani	DP	
2002	Macharia Mukiri	NARC	
2007	Joseph Nganga Kiuna	PNU	
2013	Jacob Macharia	TNA (now as Jubilie)	
2017-2027	Francis Kuria Kimani	UDA	

== Locations and wards ==
Locations
Location	Population*
Bagaria	9,716
Elburgon	49,463
Gichobo	5,495
Kapkembu	4,692
Kihingo	18,998
Lare	13,949
Mariashoni	5,563
Mau Narok	30,901
Mauche	3,070
Molo	31,574
Naishi	6,017
Nessuit	7,975
Njoro	55,501
Sachangwani	8,942
Sururu	7,054
Teret	5,792
Tuiyotich	5,973
Turi	27,838
Total	x
1999 census.

Wards
Ward	Registered Voters	Local Authority
Elburgon	14,991	Nakuru County
Kiambiriria	2,480	Molo Town
Kihingo	7,382	Nakuru County
Lare	10,140	Nakuru County
Maraishoni	1,839	Nakuru County
Mau Narok	11,731	Nakuru County
Mauche	6,326	Nakuru County
Molo	12,451	Molo Town
Nessuit	2,948	Nakuru County
Njoro	17,096	Nakuru County
Sachangwani	3,149	Molo Town
Turi North	2,441	Molo Town
Turi South	3,619	Molo Town
Total	96,593	
*September 2005.
