= Alego Constituency =

One of the Constituencies of Kenya

Alego Constituency is an electoral constituency in Kenya. It is one of six constituencies of Siaya County. The constituency was established for the 1963 national elections. It is also known as Alego-Usonga Constituency. The constituency has 13 wards, of which five elect ward representatives for the urban Siaya municipality and the rest seven for the rural Siaya. The 13 are all members of Siaya County Assembly.

== Members of Parliament ==
Elections	MP	Party	Notes
1963	Luke Rarieya Obok	KANU	
1966	Luke Rarieya Obok	KPU	
1969	Peter Okudo	KANU	One-party system
1974	Peter Oloo-Aringo	KANU	One-party system
1979	Peter Oloo-Aringo	KANU	One-party system
1983	Peter Oloo-Aringo	KANU	One-party system.
1988	Peter Oloo-Aringo	KANU	One-party system.
1992	Otieno Mak’Onyango	Ford-K	
1997	Peter Oloo-Aringo	NDP	
2002	Samuel Arthur Weya	NARC	
2007	Edwin Ochieng Yinda	ODM	
2013	George Washington Muluan Omondi	WDM	
2017	Samuel Atandi	ODM	
2022	Samuel Atandi	ODM	

== Wards ==
Wards
Ward	Registered Voters	Local Authority
Boro East	4,145	Siaya county
Boro West	4,163	Siaya county
East Alego	10,042	Siaya county
Mjini	6,348	Siaya municipality
North Alego	4,918	Siaya county
Siaya Central	2,032	Siaya municipality
Siaya East	2,701	Siaya municipality
Siaya North	2,974	Siaya municipality
Siaya West	3,740	Siaya municipality
South Alego	8,213	Siaya county
South West Alego	6,338	Siaya county
Usonga	5,881	Siaya county
West Alego	5,808	Siaya county
Total	67,303	
*September 2005.
