= Jepkorir =

Jepkorir or Chepkorir is a given name of Kenyan origin meaning "she was born when it's partially dark", either in the morning or in the evening. Notable people with the name Jepkorir or Chepkorir include:

- Eunice Jepkorir (born 1982), Kenyan steeplechase runner and 2008 Olympic runner-up
- Joan Jepkorir Aiyabei (born 1979), Kenyan cross country runner
- Magdaline Jepkorir Chemjor (born 1978), Kenyan long-distance runner and 2007 Amsterdam Marathon winner
- Valentine Jepkorir Kipketer (born 1993), Kenyan half marathon and marathon runner and 2013 Amsterdam Marathon winner

== See also ==
- Kipkorir, related surname meaning "son of Korir"
