= Robert Kiptoo Kipkorir =

Kenyan politician

Robert Kiptoo Kipkorir is a Kenyan politician.

He was third Marakwet East. He served for two terms spanning for ten years in parliament; 1983–1992. He initiated several projects in the grassroots including schools owing to his background as a school head before joining politics. He joined parliament on his first attempt, and is commonly referred to by Marakwets as Hon. Kasertich the name of his father. His political slogan was a milk gourd which in Marakwet dialect it is Setee. He hails from Embobut area Kartur village, also home to another area MP Mrs. Linah Jebii Kilimo. His time in parliament was at a time when one-party system was dominant in Kenya. KANU was the ruling party and was led by H.E Daniel Toroitich arap Moi. He also served as HICD director for 2 terms.
