= Luka Kigen =

Kenyan politician

Kigen Luka Kipkorir is a Kenyan politician. He belongs to the Orange Democratic Movement and represented the Rongai Constituency in the National Assembly of Kenya from the 2007 Kenyan general election until 2013.
