= Operation Mushroom =

Use of airpower by the Royal Air Force against the Mau Mau

- Part of Mau Mau Uprising
Date	1953–1957
Location	Kenya
Result	British victory

Belligerents
(United Kingdom) British Empire: United Kingdom; Kenya	Mau Mau

Commanders and leaders
(United Kingdom) Winston Churchill (1953–1955) (United Kingdom) Anthony Eden (1955–1956) (United Kingdom) General George Erskine; Evelyn Baring	Dedan Kimathi; Musa Mwariama; Waruhiu Itote

Units involved
Royal Air Force	Unknown

Casualties and losses
None from enemy action	900+ killed unknown number wounded

Operation Mushroom was the use of airpower by the Royal Air Force against the Mau Mau Movement during the Mau Mau Uprising in British Kenya from 1953 to 1956.

== Development ==
For an extended period of time, the chief British weapon against the forest fighters was air power. Between June 1953 and October 1955, the RAF provided a significant contribution to the conflict—and, indeed, had to, for the army was preoccupied with providing security in the reserves until January 1955, and it was the only service capable of both psychologically influencing and inflicting considerable casualties on the Mau Mau fighters operating in the dense forests. Lack of timely and accurate intelligence meant bombing was rather haphazard, but almost 900 insurgents had been killed or wounded by air attacks by June 1954, and it did cause forest gangs to disband, lower their morale, and induce their pronounced relocation from the forests to the tribal reservations.

Contrary to what is sometimes claimed, Lancaster bombers were not used during the Emergency, though Lincolns were. The latter flew their first mission on 18 November 1953 and remained in Kenya until 28 July 1955, dropping nearly 6 million bombs. They and other aircraft, such as blimps, were also deployed for reconnaissance, as well as in the propaganda war, conducting large-scale leaflet-drops.

After the Lari massacre, for example, British planes dropped leaflets showing graphic pictures of the Kikuyu women and children who had been hacked to death. Unlike the rather indiscriminate activities of British ground forces, the use of air power was more restrained (though there is disagreement on this point), and air attacks were initially permitted only in the forests. Operation Mushroom extended bombing beyond the forest limits in May 1954, and Churchill consented to its continuation in January 1955.

== Aircraft used ==
- Avro Lincoln - heavy bomber
- de Havilland Vampire - fighter-bomber
- Gloster Meteor - fighter-bomber
- North American Harvard - trainer

== Sources ==
- Chappell, Stephen (2011). "Air Power in the Mau Mau Conflict: The Government's Chief Weapon" (PDF). RUSI Journal. 156 (1): 64–70. doi:10.1080/03071847.2011.559986. S2CID 153183293. Archived from the original (PDF) on 20 October 2013.
- Edgerton, Robert B. (1989). Mau Mau: An African Crucible. New York, NY: The Free Press. ISBN 978-0-029-08920-0.
