= Waruhiu Itote =

Kenyan revolutionary leader

Waruhiu Itote (1922 – 30 April 1993, aged 70-71), nom de guerre General China, was one of the key leaders of the Mau Mau Uprising (1952–1960) in British Kenya alongside Dedan Kimathi, Stanley Mathenge, Kurito ole Kisio, Kubu Kubu, and Musa Mwariama and Muthoni Kirima.

Itote was the first senior Mau Mau leader to be captured by the government, when he fell into a trap in 1954. He was jailed alongside future Kenyan president Jomo Kenyatta.

Because of his cooperation with the colonial government, Itote's legacy is often controversial. To most of his compatriots, he was a turn-coat who saved his neck by betraying others. He is regarded one of the few moderates among the largely radical Mau Mau leadership.

== Early life ==
Waruhiu Itote was born into a prosperous farming family in Kaheti village, Mukurwe-ini division, Nyeri District in 1922. He received minimal education at a local Church of Scotland mission, before moving to Nairobi as a teenager to escape his father's beatings.

He married his first wife, Leah Wambura, in December 1940.

Itote enlisted in the British army in 1942, serving in the King's African Rifles throughout Asia, firstly at Ceylon and then in the Burma Campaign. Whilst in Burma he was promoted to the rank of Corporal. He passed up an opportunity for promotion and asked to be discharged

Returning to Kenya, he became disillusioned with the lack of opportunities for black soldiers while white soldiers were being rewarded, leading him to become involved in urban politics as he joined the Kenya African Union in 1946. In the company of fellow ex-army comrades he dabbled in the criminal underworld as part of Nairobi's Forty Group, to supplement his wages as a fireman.

== Mau Mau Years ==
In 1950, Itote swore the Mau Mau oath, and subsequently became responsible for oathing and was an executioner of traitors. As the police began clamping down on Mau Mau activities in 1952, Itote moved to the forests of Mount Kenya with a band of followers to join the insurgency. From here Itote began a wave of attacks on white settler farms in Nyeri and targeted loyalists in nearby villages. He soon gained a reputation as a skilled commander with an ability to organise.

== Capture ==
Itote was captured by British troops on 15 January 1954 during a failed operation against a police post in Mathira. During the capture, he was shot and wounded in the neck.

He was charged with consorting with persons carrying firearms and being in possession of ammunition. Itote was represented at his trial by the prominent Asian lawyer A.R. Kapila. Itote was found guilty and sentenced to hang.

== Negotiations to end the War ==
Following a deal instigated by Ian Henderson, Itote agreed to cooperate with the government and negotiate an end to the uprising in return for his life. The cooperation of Itote helped General Erskine bring Operation Anvil to a close.

== Detention and later life ==
Itote was placed in a detention camp in Lokitaung. Here he stayed with his former opponent, Jomo Kenyatta who taught him how to speak and write in English.

In prison, Itote saved the future president's life after a fellow inmate, Kariuki Chotara, then a minor on murder charges, attempted to stab Jomo Kenyatta.

Itote stayed in detention for the next nine years, and was released in 1962. He was then taken under the wing of Kenyatta in his new government. He also got military training in Israel, before returning to Kenya to serve as assistant director of the National Youth Service under Geoffrey Griffin, a position he held up to 1984.

In 1967 he published his autobiography, "Mau Mau" General (East African Publishing House), and in 1979 wrote Mau Mau in Action (Transafrica Books). He served as the top officer of Kenya National Youth service with his headquarters at Ruaraka, Nairobi.

He died of a stroke in 1993 at the age of 71. At the time of his death he was running a farm near Ol Kalou in Kenya.

== Legacy ==
In 2010, Waruhiu's wife and stepdaughter donated the bullet that had been lodged in his neck for three decades to the National Museums of Kenya. The bullet was removed in 1988; it had gone through his chin, bruised his collarbone, ricocheted to the left and then lodged itself at the base of his neck.

== Books ==
- General China- 'Mau Mau' General (1967)
