= Capture of Kimathi =

- Part of Nyeri Forest Mau Mau Uprising
Date	21 October 1956
Location	Kenya
Result	British victory

Belligerents
(United Kingdom) British Empire: Kenya	Mau Mau

Commanders and leaders
Ian Henderson	Dedan Kimathi

Units involved
Kenya Police	Unknown

Casualties and losses
None	Dedan Kimathi captured

The Capture of Kimathi was the arrest of noted Mau Mau leader Dedan Kimathi during the Mau Mau Uprising in October 1956. Kimathi had been the field commander of the Mau Mau. He was captured by British police officer Ian Henderson who used intelligence gathered from disgruntled former Mau Mau.

== Aftermath ==
Kimathi was sentenced to death and hanged on 18 February 1957 at Kamiti Maximum Security Prison. His death has come to be regarded as the end of the forest war in the Uprising.

Henderson was rewarded with a George Medal for his efforts and wrote a book about the experience, Man Hunt in Kenya. Shortly after the capture he was presented to Princess Margaret who was touring Kenya.
