= Wamuyu =

Wamuyu is both a Kenyan feminine given name and surname. Notable people with the surname include:

== Given name ==
- Wamuyu Gakuru (1934–?), Kenyan freedom fighter

== Surname ==
- Gladys Wamuyu (born 1972), Kenyan middle-distance runner
