= Operation Jock Scott =

- Part of Mau Mau Uprising
Date	20–21 October 1952
Location	Kenya
Result	British victory

Belligerents
(United Kingdom) British Empire: United Kingdom; Kenya	Kenya Land and Freedom Army

Commanders and leaders
Gov. Evelyn Baring	Unknown

Strength
Unknown	Unknown

Casualties and losses
Unknown	Unknown

Operation Jock Scott took place shortly after the declaration of State of Emergency in the Mau Mau Rebellion. British troops suspended African political leaders and rounded up suspected Mau Mau leaders.
