= Ciokaraine M'Barungu =

Kenyan political leader and human rights activist

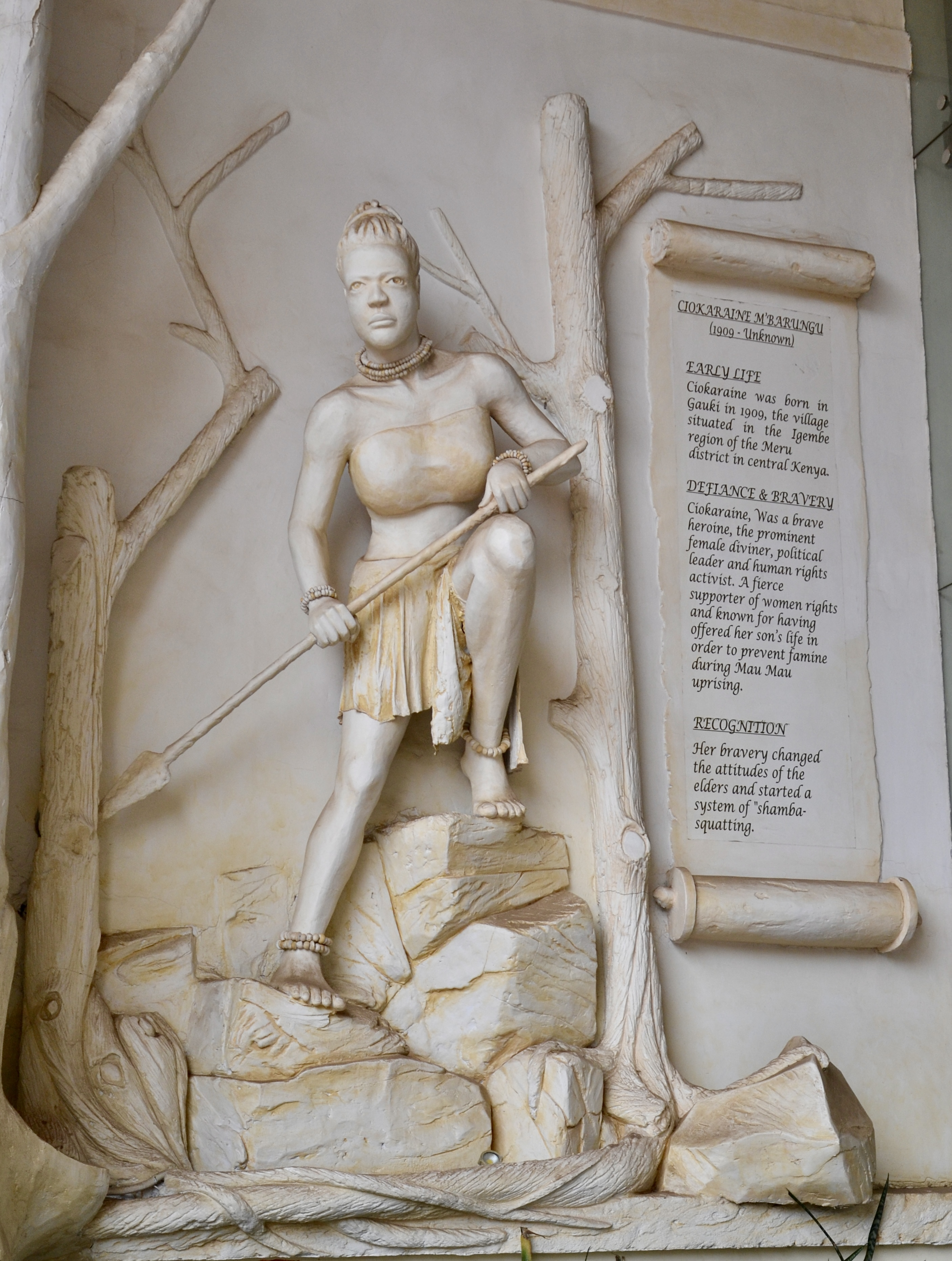
Sculpture of Ciokaraine M’Barungu at Kenyan National Library Service building, Nairobi

Ciokaraine M'Barungu (1909 - unknown), known simply as Ciokaraine, was a prominent female diviner, political leader and human rights activist from Igembe, Kenya. She was a fierce supporter of women's rights and is known for having offered up her son's life during the Mau Mau Uprising.

== Early life ==
Ciokaraine was born in Rusanga, Athiru Ruuine in 1909, the village situated in the Igembe region of the Meru district in Upper eastern region, Kenya.She came from antubeiya clan of Igembe subtribe of Meru community, a clan known for in the region for producing tough women. After her parents died, she and her siblings were raised by their grandfather, Kabira wa Mwichuria, a well-known muaa ( meru traditional medicine man). Ciokaraine was her grandfather's favorite and she accompanied him on his healing rounds. He treated people of all ages, and Ciokaraine was exposed to various situations notably involving women and children.

== Defiance & Bravery ==
Early in 1954, during the resistance to the colonial settlers, a member of the Njuri Ncheke named Kibuti was dragged out of his home and killed by Mau Mau rebels during the Mau Mau Uprising, a war in the British Kenya Colony (1920–1963) between the Kenya Land and Freedom Army (KLFA), also known as Mau Mau, and the British authorities. This led to a ruling by British colonialists that accused the residents of Gauki of maintaining supply lines to the insurgents. They planned on moving the residents to Kiegoi, located in the Igembe South Constituency, to ensure they couldn't support the Mau Mau hiding in the nearby forests.

Ciokaraine stood up bravely against the patriarchal Njuri Ncheke the senior chief of Igembe, Ntoamuruaa. He then ordered residents of Ithima and Akachiu to gather near the trade town of Maua and bring sacks and baskets with them. It was at this meeting that the colonial government took notice of Ciokaraine.

At the gathering, the colonial authorities announced to the people that they were to uproot all edible food from their shambas (farms). Ciokaraine stood up defiantly and instructed the people, "The yams and bananas must not be uprooted." The Senior chief was displeased with her disobedience and she was given direct orders to explain herself. She responded fearlessly and asked that, instead of destroying the food and potentially starving the entire region, the colonial forces must guard the yams and bananas and stop the Mau Mau from killing any more residents. "I am ready to sacrifice my son if that will stop the killing," she stated.

== Recognition ==
Her bravery changed the attitudes of the elders and started a system of "shamba-squatting," where colonial forces occupied all farms close to the forests in order to prevent the Mau Mau from stealing the crops.

A few weeks after the meeting, senior chief M'Muraa recommended Ciokaraine for the position of assistant chief. She was appointed the first female headman in April 1954 and held the position until she retired in 1959 after being involved in a car accident while on official duty.

Ciokaraine survived the accident and remained active in her community after retirement. Her legacy continues and she is said to have been as famous as Cierume of the Mbeere and Wangu wa Makeri of the Gikuyu.
