= Wamuyu Gakuru =

Kenyan freedom fighter (1934–?)

Wamūyū Gakuru, also known as Cinda Reri, was a Kenyan freedom fighter involved with the Mau Mau rebellion against British colonial forces.

== Early life ==
Anna Wamūyū Kabubi was born in 1934. She was raised by Mundu Gakuru and Thigia Gakuru in a village in Kariuthi, at the foothills of Mt. Kenya. Her father was a subsistence farmer while her mother was a homemaker in the Kenya Colony governed by the Colonial British Empire in Kenya. Gakuru attended Goramo Private School and was 16 when she was introduced to the Gakaara Wa Wanjau anti-colonial political movement.

== Historical background ==
The Mau Mau insurgency was a response to British colonial rule in Kenya since the 19th century. The Kikuya ethnic group opposed the construction of a railroad into Uganda through its territories. The British met the Kikuya resistance with force, carrying out executions and enforcing brutal measures to put down the uprising.

The resulting rebels were labelled Mau Mau by the British forces, lending its name to the movement. It consisted of involvement from the Kikuyu, Embu, and Meru ethnic groups in Kenya. Entry to the movement was through an oath-taking ceremony.

== Role in the Kenyan independence movement ==
Gakuru pushed for decolonization and women's empowerment. She took the Mau Mau oath in 1948 as part of the Kenya African Union (KAU) and worked towards recruiting girls into the movement. She took the Batuni oath in 1951 in Goramo village, Central Province. This marked a significant shift in her involvement, as the Batuni Oath signified a call to arms and a commitment to the guerrilla movement. Motivated by the arrest of freedom fighter Jomo Kenyatta and others in 1952, she embraced the belief that armed resistance was necessary to drive out the colonialists.

After the Batuni Oath, Gakuru was tasked with infiltrating the homes of white settlers by the Mau Mau leadership to gather intelligence and locate hidden weapons. Employed with settlers known only by the names Kihara and Hines, she played a role in successful raids by the rebels.

In 1953, Gakuru's involvement escalated as she participated in gun running near Nanyuki Airport, shuttling between the forest camp at Mt. Kenya and the Mau Mau operational base. Her work, with a fellow rebel known mononymously as Musoka, led to the rebels securing a substantial cache of weapons.

She joined the Hika Hika battalion in 1955, also known as the Mount Kenya or Mathathi Army, under the command of Waruhiu Itote, famously known as General China. Her unit encompassed the Nyeri, Embu, and Meru regions of Kenya. Gakuru's specific involvements with the battalion included espionage focused on the movements of the colonial army and the native colonial police forces, and as ration commander. She was trained in arms by a World War II veteran, Mbithi Manyuira.

== Legacy ==
In later life, Wamūyū Gakuru reflected on the weaknesses of the Mau Mau movement, noting a lack of unity among its leaders as a significant flaw. She criticized self-appointed leaders without leadership qualities as hindering coordination within the movement. Gakuru highlighted the marginalization of women, weakening the movement's impact. However, she recognized the movement's contribution in accelerating the struggle for Kenyan independence from colonial rule. Gakuru advocated for recognizing the Mau Mau's contributions through museums and monuments to educate younger generations about its significance.
