= Kurito ole Kisio =

Kurito ole Kisio was a Mau Mau general who was killed in Narok, Kenya, in 1954. One of the lesser known leaders of the rebellion, Kisio was the highest ranking Mau Mau leader from the Maasai community. He fought alongside Turesh ole Tikani and Muntet ole Nkapiani. Although little is known about him today, Kisio's role in the freedom movement was important because it shows the Mau Mau Uprising was not a Kikuyu-only affair. According to Mau Mau chronicler Karari Njama, ole Kisio was the fourth most powerful man within Mau Mau ranks. He had an army of about 800 fighters operating from Melili Forest in Narok.

== Background ==
Although subdued by colonial domination and disease decades earlier, the Maasai were not all collaborators as most historical narratives of the rebellion portray them. Instead, there were at least two large scale units in Maasailand, one in Narok led by Kisio and another in Kajiado. Their grievances were primarily about land, since a large chunk of the land the new colony was built on, including the capital city Nairobi, had been part of Maasai grazing grounds.

General ole Kisio was one of many Maasai men who were recruited to fight for the British Empire during the Second World War. He left Kenya when he was 15 in the same group as Turesh ole Tikani and Muntet ole Nkapiani, who became his lifelong friends. When they returned, Kurito, now aged 19, married Miriam Enekurito, a Kikuyu girl whose family had settled in Narok. He then joined the freedom movement. One of his first roles in the rebellion was to ferry stolen guns and other equipment from Narok to Elementaita and Nyandarua. Later, he became one of the most important leaders of the rebellion.

== Death ==
Because of his involvement with the rebellion, Kisio's wife was arrested, beaten and detained. Kisio was lured from the forest by two of his friends in Rotien, Narok in 1954. He was shot and killed, and his body paraded outside a hospital. His friend and second-in-command, General Nkapian was captured and also paraded publicly in a cage before he was hanged, marking the effective end of the Maasai role in the mainstream Mau Mau rebellion.

Kisio's role in the movement, as at the highest decision-making levels, shows the nationalistic composition of the rebellion. The highest rank was given to Dedan Kimathi, although at least three others held the position of Field Marshal.
