= Stanley Mathenge =

Kenyan rebel in the Mau Mau rebellion

- Born: Stanley Mathenge wa Mirugi; 1919; Kenya
- Disappeared: 1955; Kenya
- Spouse: Muthoni Mathenge

Stanley Mathenge wa Mirugi (born c. 1919; disappeared 1955) was a Kenyan military leader during the Mau Mau rebellion.

== Background ==
He was born in Mahiga, Nyeri District.

Before the Mau Mau rebellion, he had fought in Burma. Later he became the leader of the Forty Group, an organisation supporting the Kenya African Union (KAU). He also founded the Kenya Riigi, a group of courageous fighters. Mathenge believed in the traditional Kikuyu religion. In May 1953 he became the leader of the newly formed Mau Mau military unit Nyeri District Council and Army. His rivalry with field marshal Dedan Kimathi harmed the integrity of the Mau Mau movement.

== Disappearance ==
He disappeared in 1955 and was later reported to be allegedly living in Ethiopia. Mathenge left with his battalion to Ethiopia where he is said to have died in 2016. His brother, Joseph Kiiru Mirugi, died in 2009 in Mahiga, Othaya and his wife, Muthoni wa Mathenge, is still alive and resides in Mweiga, Nyeri. One prevailing conspiracy theory is that he was killed in his power rivalry with Kimathi, who then made up the story that Mathenge had gone to Ethiopia to seek assistance from Haile Selassie.

== Later events ==
On May 30, 2003 a man believed to be Stanley Mathenge, living in Ethiopia, was invited to Kenya by president Mwai Kibaki and was given a hero's welcome by the state. It was soon revealed that the man was Ato Lemma Ayanu, who himself denied being Mathenge. A DNA test published four years later proved he was not Mathenge.

== See also ==
- List of people who disappeared
