= Lari massacre =

Massacre during the Mau Mau Uprising

Lari Massacre
- Part of Mau Mau Uprising
- Lari (Kenya)
- Operational scope: Terrorist attack
- Location: Lari, Kenya Colony
- Planned by: Mau Mau Leadership
- Target: Kikuyu Home Guard
- Objective: Murder of Chief Luka Mbugua Kahangara and loyalist Home Guard soldiers and civilians
- Date: 26 March 1953
- Executed by: Mau Mau
- Casualties: 74 killed, 50 wounded

The Lari massacre was an incident during the Mau Mau Uprising in which the Mau Mau massacred approximately 74 people, including some members of the loyalist Home Guard, but mostly their families: women, children and elderly relatives. Those murdered included prominent local loyalist Luka Kahangara. A total of 309 rebels were prosecuted for the massacre, of whom 136 were convicted. Seventy-one of those convicted were executed by hanging.

The militants herded men, women and children into huts and set fire to them, hacking down with machetes anyone who attempted escape, before throwing them back into the burning huts. The attack at Lari was so extreme that "African policemen who saw the bodies of the victims ... were physically sick and said 'These people are animals. If I see one now I shall shoot with the greatest eagerness'", and it "even shocked many Mau Mau supporters, some of whom would subsequently try to excuse the attack as 'a mistake'." The colonial government used the attack as propaganda and showed the massacre to journalists. The massacre prompted retaliatory attacks. 400 Mau Mau rebels were reputedly killed by colonial troops, including the King's African Rifles, in revenge.

== Sources ==
- Anderson, David (2005). Histories of the Hanged: The Dirty War in Kenya and the End of Empire. London: Weidenfeld & Nicolson. ISBN 978-0-297-84719-9.
- French, David (2011). The British Way in Counter-Insurgency, 1945–1967. Oxford: Oxford University Press. ISBN 978-0-199-58796-4.
