= Forty Group =

Kenyan organisation

The Forty Group was a Kenyan society or organization of the mid-twentieth century constituted primarily of members of the Kenya African Union who joined with the aim of using violence to make their voice heard. The name is a translation of the Gĩkũyũ phrase Anake a 40, which means The Young Men of 40. The organization was also called Kiama kia 40 translating to The (political) party of 40. The number 40 is a reference to the year 1940, in which most of the group's core members were drafted into the British Colonial Auxiliary Forces.

The organization consisted mainly of men fresh from service in World War II. It was founded by Mwangi Macharia and gradually evolved into part of the Mau Mau rebellion of the 1950s. Stanley Mathenge was one of the leaders of the Forty Group.
