= Muthoni Kirima =

Kenyan guerrilla fighter (1931–2023)

Field Marshal Mũthoni Kĩrĩma
- Born: Mũthoni Wihihuini, 1931; Nairutia, Nyeri County
- Died: 3 September 2023 (aged 91–92)

Field-Marshal Mũthoni Kĩrĩma (1931 – 4 September 2023) was a female fighter in Mau Mau's 1950s rebellion against British colonialism. Few Mau Mau women became active fighters, and Mũthoni was the only woman to have attained the Mau Mau rank of field-marshal.

== Early life ==
Mũthoni Kĩrĩma was born in Nairutia village, Nyeri County, Kenya, in 1931. She was born Mũthoni Wihihuini, originating from her grandfather's name. When Mũthoni was very little, her family moved to Karing’ũ for a better life. The journey was mentioned by her as long and hard for her as a young girl. They traveled 15 km, half on a small donkey with no saddle, and the other half she walked herself. During her time in Karing’ũ, Mũthoni first learned about Christianity and became infatuated with it. As a child, she went into the missionaries’ tent with other children to learn about Christianity. By the time she was eight years old, she started her long-standing devotion to the church.

Her experience of racial violence between Kenyan settlers and the Kikuyu came when she was doing child labor at the farm of a white settler. During this period of her life, she saw verbal and emotional abuse, physical violence toward Kikuyu men, and sexual violence toward Kikuyu women. This inspired her resolve to fight for independence to free her people and her country. In 1948, she met her husband Mũtũngi Gicũhi, who was a young cook working at the same settler farm as she did. After their wedding, the couple moved to the edge of Nyeri town and started their own life; Mũthoni became a trader and her husband became a cook.

== In the Mau Mau uprising ==
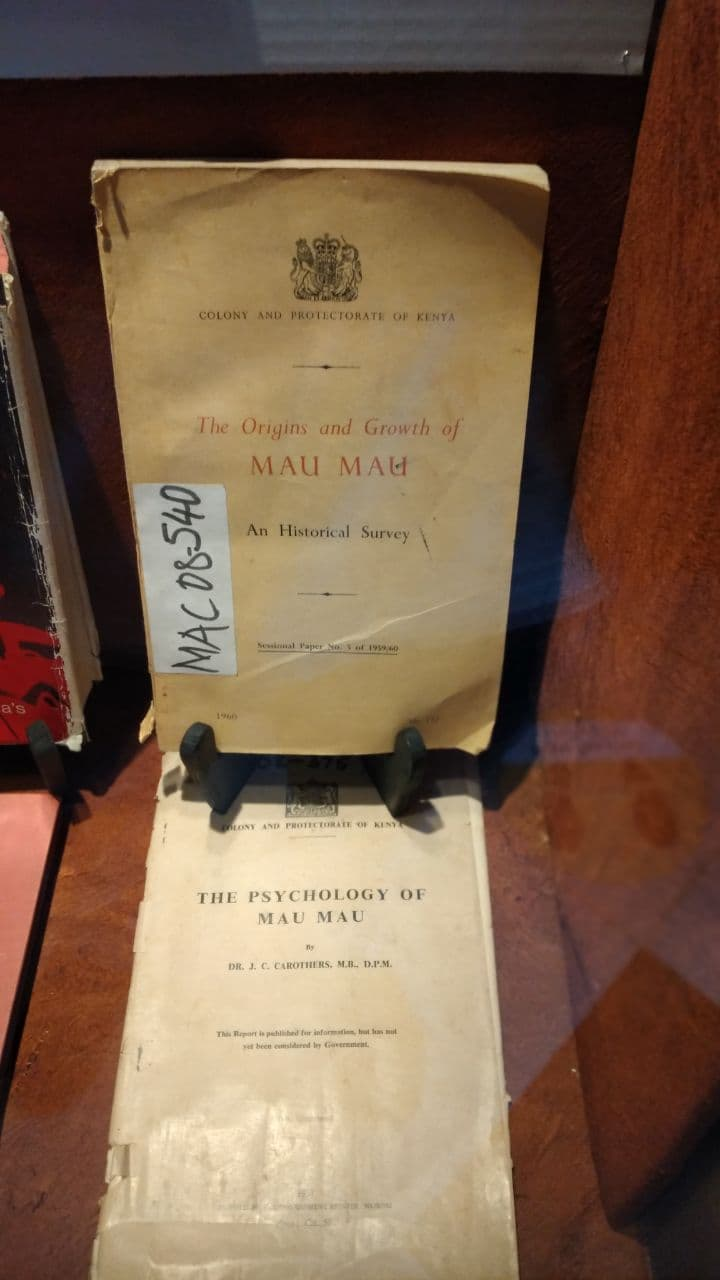
This publication from 1959/60 narrates the events that led to the rise of the freedom fighters, Mau Mau

Mũthoni Kĩrĩma a first took the Mau Mau oath in 1952. From then on, she had to balance being part of the revolution with family responsibilities. She started out by using her connections as a trader to get information and events that were happening to the Mau Mau that were in the forest. She also organized the oaths of other people. This was extremely hard on her because at this time her husband didn’t take the oath and she felt guilty lying to him. This changed in 1953 when her husband Mũtũngi Gicũhi, finally decided that he wanted to take the oath and join the Mau Mau. That same day, Mũthoni Kĩrĩma took him and a goat to her father in law’s home in the Kinaini forest where he swore his oath to the Mau Mau fighters. That was the last time that she would see her husband for 11 years, as he lived in the forest until 1963.

The next day, Chief Mũhoya, who was an African colonial chief in Kenya, sent soldiers to Mũthoni Kĩrĩma’s house to check on her husband, as he was a candidate to be a member of the Kamatimũ, a loyalist group under Chief Mũhoya. When they questioned her, she told them that he went to get eggs and had not returned, so they eventually left. Three days later, they came back with the suspicion that he joined the Mau Mau fighters. To get the information that they needed, they beat her relentlessly. In an interview, she describes this by saying, “I was beaten up. They kicked me with their boots until I could hardly move. Blood oozed from my nostrils. They left me unconscious.” She credits this moment as the turning point that made her want to not just be in the village helping the Mau Mau fighters but to be a forest fighter. This was when she took off to the forest and after a week by herself, she found the Mau Mau fighters.

Kĩrĩma started her time in the forest as a non-combatant; like most of the other women, she just cooked and looked after the soldiers while getting them ammunition and grenades from the market. But she quickly impressed her fellow soldiers with her shooting skills and quick thinking. Before long, she was leading her own platoons and helped break the gender norms of the Mau Mau fighters. In an interview in 2015, a woman veteran soldier says, “There was one woman called Mũthoni, I was with her. She feared nothing. She used to go to war with men because she did not fear. She was a dangerous woman; even men feared her.”

Mũthoni was one of the female leaders of the movement and she rose up the ranks quickly. However, not all of the promotions of rank had to do with combat, Mau Mau fighters also rewarded people for non-military achievements to encourage development in their movement. She was promoted a few times because when a shortage of food was a problem, she went out of the way to get food for the movement and for her troops. Acts like this, as well as her skill in combat, was why she was promoted to field marshal. She was also a great medic and took care of the injured.

== Trading in ivory ==
Field Marshal Mũthoni, got a license to trade in ivory in 1966, recovering and selling tusks the Mau Maus had buried around Mount Kenya, having hunted elephants for food and ivory during the uprising. Her permission to collect and sell "wild" ivory ended in 1976 when trade in ivory was banned.

== Later life ==
After the war ended in 1956 Mũthoni, and other Mau Mau fighters had a very hard time getting back into society. As the Mau Mau group was still seen as a radical organization and after the war, they were put in detention camps and beaten as others tried to create their new life. Mũthoni, was one of those who tried to create a new life, but she was struggling. She and her husband had no money or capital and although they were part of the people who fought for independence, they did not get any of the benefits of the new government. People forgot and didn’t care about them, so they had to struggle begging for food on the street and sleeping next to toilets, until Mũthoni, was fed up with the situation.

She went right to the Mayor of Nairobi, and according to her biography, this is what happened next: “When I walked to his office, I didn’t first talk to him, I just lay down on the mat. He rose up and asked me what my problem was. I told him I was not going to leave until he gave me a place to stay and if none was available, he was to leave me sleeping on his office mat as he went home.” After this the mayor found her the place that she lived in Nyeri where she stayed until her death. Although not a lot of people knew who she was or what she has done, she got visitors who liked to hear her story.

In 1990, she served as a nominated councilor in Nyeri County Council, central Kenya.

In 1998, President Daniel arap Moi awarded her a medal for distinguished service, and in 2014, President Uhuru Kenyatta awarded her the Head of State Commendation.

Mũthoni lived in a Nyeri suburb until her death. "Kenya is my only child," she told the Daily Nation in an interview in 2012, referencing a miscarriage during her time in the forest which left her unable to conceive. However, she adopted children.

As of 2013, she still wore her hair in the long dreadlocks that she had grown while she was hiding from the British. She has said that she will not cut her hair until she sees the benefit of independence. On 2 April 2022, Mũthoni had her dreadlocks cut by Mama Ngina Kenyatta, the wife of Kenya's first president Jomo Kenyatta and the mother of Uhuru Kenyatta, another Kenyan president. Ngina Kenyatta led the celebration, as the two reminisced about their youthful life, friendship and freedom fighting.

Justifying the move to shave her six-foot-long dreadlocks, Mũthoni spoke against reports alleging that Mama Ngina compelled her to shave. The freedom fighter addressed the issues on Monday, 4 April, two days after "independence". Muthoni underlined that she resorted to shaving her head to signify that Kenya had finally gained full independence. Mama Ngina, speaking after shaving the freedom fighter, stated that she was highly honoured to be selected to cut the dreadlocks.

== Death ==
Mũthoni Kĩrĩma died in Nairobi on 4 September 2023, at the age of 92.
