= Dedan Kimathi =

Kenyan leader during the Mau Mau Uprising (1920–1957)

Field Marshal Dedan Kĩmathi Waciũri
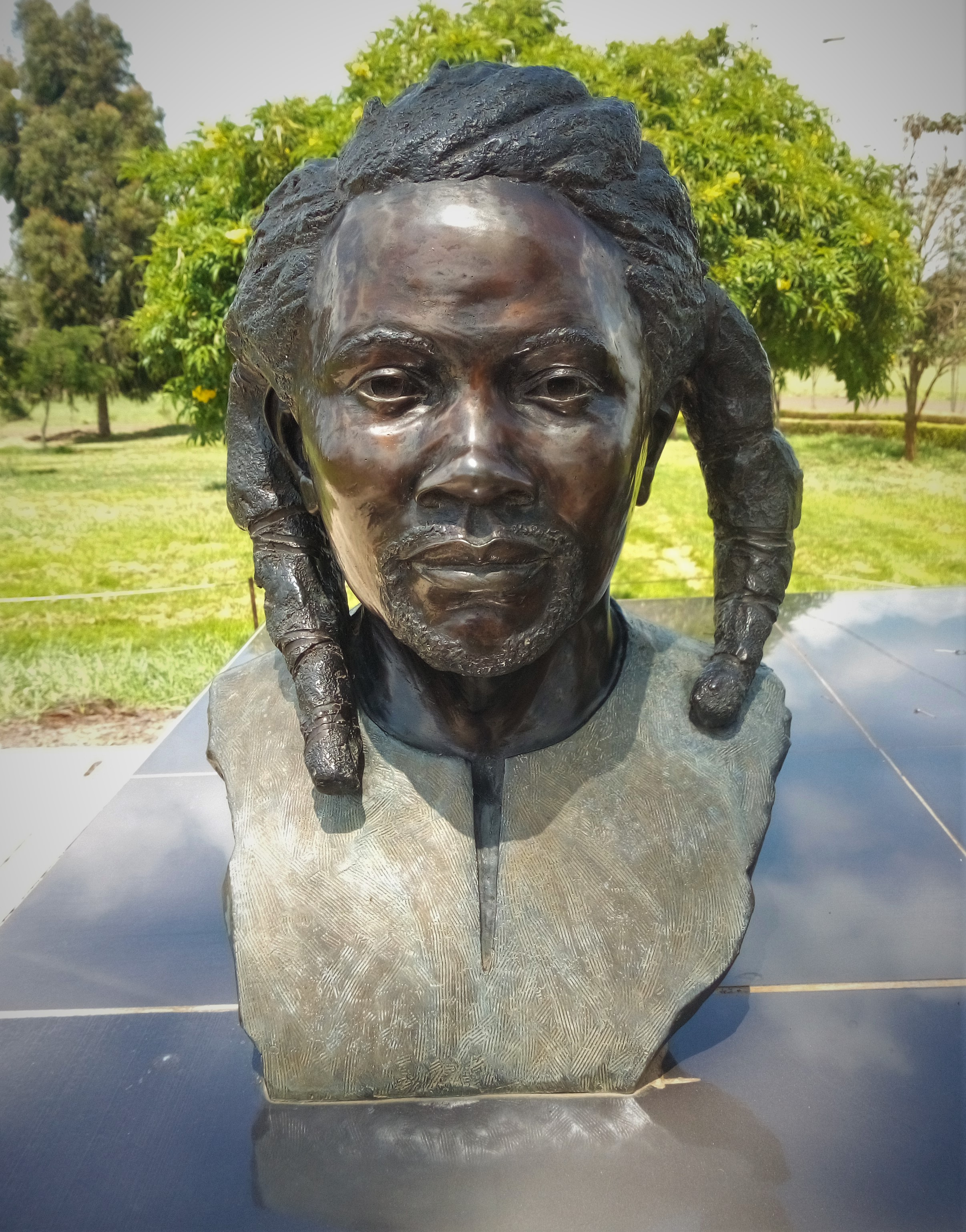
- Born: Kĩmathi wa Waciũri; 31 October 1920; Nyeri District, Central Province, Kenya
- Died: 18 February 1957 (aged 36); Kamiti Maximum Security Prison, Nairobi, British Kenya
- Cause of death: Execution by hanging
- Resting place: Kamiti Maximum Security Prison (Alleged)
- Occupations: Teacher, soldier
- Organization: Kenya Land and Freedom Army
- Known for: Leader of the Kenya Land and Freedom Army
- Spouse: Mũkami Kĩmathi

Dedan Kĩmathi Waciũri (born Kĩmathi Waciũri; 31 October 1920 – 18 February 1957) was the leader of the Kenya Land and Freedom Army during the Mau Mau Uprising (1952–1960) against the British colonial rule in Kenya in the 1950s. He was captured by the British in 1956 and executed in 1957. Kenya gained independence in 1963. Kĩmathi is credited with leading efforts to create formal military structures within the Mau Mau, and convening a war council in 1953. He, along with Baimungi M'marete, Musa Mwariama, Kubu Kubu, General China and Mũthoni Kīrīma, was one of the Field Marshals.

Kenyan nationalists view him as a freedom fighter in the Kenyan struggle for independence, while the British colonial authorities labelled Kĩmathi as a terrorist, and according to historian David Anderson "did all they could to besmirch his reputation." Despite being viewed negatively by Kenya's first two presidents, Jomo Kenyatta and Daniel arap Moi, Kĩmathi and his fellow Mau Mau rebels were officially recognised as heroes in the struggle for Kenyan independence under the Mwai Kibaki administration, culminating in the unveiling of a Kĩmathi statue in 2007. This was reinforced by the passage of a new Constitution in 2010 calling for recognition of national heroes.

== Ethnicity ==
Kimathi belonged to the Ambu Clan, one of the nine clans that make the Kikuyu, Kenya's largest ethnic group, which is concentrated mainly in the central part of the East African Country.

== Early life ==
Kĩmathi was born on 31st October 1920 in Thege village near Nyeri County in central Kenya, where his father, valuing education, sent him to school. He entered elementary school at the age of fifteen and went to join the church of Scotland mission secondary school in the region but later dropped out. Kĩmathi excelled and his skills in writing and speech were noted. Anderson writes however that Kĩmathi was fiercely competitive, bullying, and frequently disciplined by teachers. Kĩmathi traveled to Nairobi in the late 1930s and joined the British army in 1940 but, according to Anderson, was discharged after one month, allegedly for drunkenness and violence. He moved from job to job, from swineherd to primary school teacher, from which he was reportedly dismissed after accusations of violence against his pupils.

== Mau Mau movement ==
Around 1947 or 1948, while working in Ol Kalou, Kĩmathi came into contact with members of the Kenya African Union (KAU). By 1950 he had become secretary to the KAU branch at Ol Kalou, which was controlled by militant supporters of the Mau Mau cause. The Mau Mau began as the Kenya Land and Freedom Army (KLFA), a militant Kikuyu, Embu and Meru army which sought to reclaim land, which the British settlers had gradually stripped away from them. Later the term MAU MAU came to mean "Mzungu Arudi Ulaya, mwafrika apate uhuru" a swahili phrase which means - Let the foreigner go back to Europe so the African can gain independence. As the group's influence and membership widened it became a major threat to the colonial government.

Upon taking the oath of the Mau Mau, Kĩmathi in 1951 joined the Forty Group, the militant wing of the defunct Kikuyu Central Association. As branch secretary, Kĩmathi presided over oath-taking. He believed in compelling fellow Kikuyu by way of oath to bring solidarity to the independence movement. To achieve this he administered beatings and carried a double-barrelled shotgun. His activities with the group made him a target of the colonial government, and he was briefly arrested that same year but escaped with the help of local police. This marked the beginning of his involvement in the uprising, and he formed the Kenya Defence Council to co-ordinate all forest fighters in 1953.

== Capture and execution ==
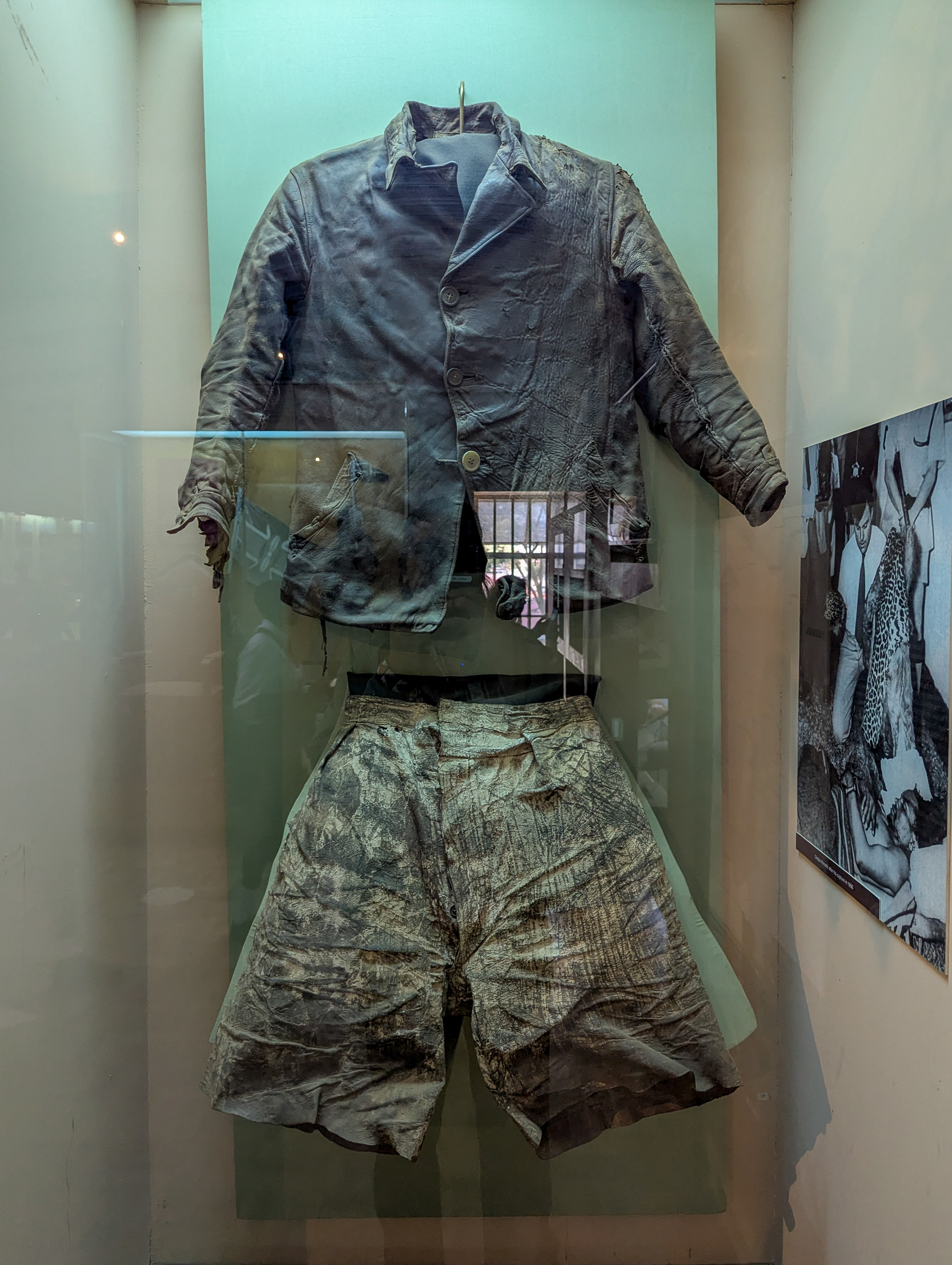
Uniform worn by Dedan Kimathi when he was killed. Collection of the National Museum of Kenya.

Kĩmathi's fight for an independent Kenya came to an end in 1956. On 21 October of that year, Ian Henderson, a British colonial police officer who had been on an "obsessive hunt" for Kĩmathi managed to trap him in his hide-out in the forest. Kĩmathi was shot in the leg and captured by a Tribal Policeman called Ndirangu Mau. (Note: Ndirangu Mau had joined the Tribal Police in 1940 at a salary of Sh60 a month to help maintain peace in tribal settlements. He patrolled villages around Nyeri, Karatina and Ihururu. He said he joined the colonial forces and not the freedom fighters because he thought it would "help ease the tension between the two forces". He hoped that he would somehow "help the white man understand Africans were angry about the loss of their land". After the capture and execution of Kimathi, Ndirangu Mau was shunned and pilloried by local villagers. His family bore the brunt, his children being treated as outcasts in school and physically bullied. They lived on a small piece of land under a cloud of suspicion.) His capture marked the beginning of the end of the forest war; the image of Kĩmathi being carried away on a stretcher was printed in leaflets by the British (over 120,000 were distributed), to demoralise the Mau Mau and their supporters.

Kĩmathi was charged under the Emergency Regulations with unlawful possession of a .38 Webley Scott revolver and six rounds of ammunition. He was tried before Chief Justice O’Connor with three African assessors. O’Connor found him guilty and sentenced him to death while he lay in a hospital bed at the General Hospital in Nyeri. His appeal was dismissed, and the sentence was upheld.

The day before his execution, Kimathi wrote a letter to a Father Marino asking him to get his son an education: "He is far from many of your schools, but I trust that something must be done to see that he starts earlier under your care." He also wrote about his wife, Mũkami saying "She is detained at Kamĩtĩ Prison and I suggest that she will be released some time. I would like her to be comforted by sisters e.g. Sister Modester, etc. for she too feels lonely. And if by any possibility she can be near the mission as near Mathari so that she may be so close to the sisters and to the church."

He asked to see his wife, and the morning of the execution Mũkami was allowed to see Kĩmathi. The two chatted for close to two hours. He told her that "I have no doubt in my mind that the British are determined to execute me. I have committed no crime. My only crime is that I am a Kenyan revolutionary who led a liberation army... Now If I must leave you and my family I have nothing to regret about. My blood will water the tree of Independence."

In the early morning of 18 February 1957 he was executed by British soldiers by hanging at the Kamĩtĩ Maximum Security Prison. He was buried in an unmarked grave, and his burial site remained unknown for 62 years until 25 October 2019 when the Dedan Kĩmathi Foundation reported that the grave-site had been identified at the Kamĩtĩ Prison grounds.

== Personal life ==
Kĩmathi was married to Mũkami Kĩmathi. The government constructed a three-bedroomed house for Mukami at her farm in Kinangop, Nyandarua County in 2009 and provided her with a double cabin pickup for private use in 2012. In 2010, Kĩmathi's widow requested that the search for her husband's body be renewed so she could give him a proper burial. Mũkami Kĩmathi died on 4 May 2023 at the age of 96 and was buried in Njabini Kinangop.

== Legacy ==
=== Official registration of the Mau Mau ===
On 11 November 2003, the Kibaki government formally registered the Mau Mau movement, disregarding the colonial-era legislation that had outlawed the organisation and branded its members "terrorists". In his remarks during the handing over of the certificate, Vice President Moody Awori regretted that it had taken 40 years for the group to be officially registered despite the sacrifices the Mau Mau had made for Kenya's independence.

=== The Dedan Kimathi statue ===
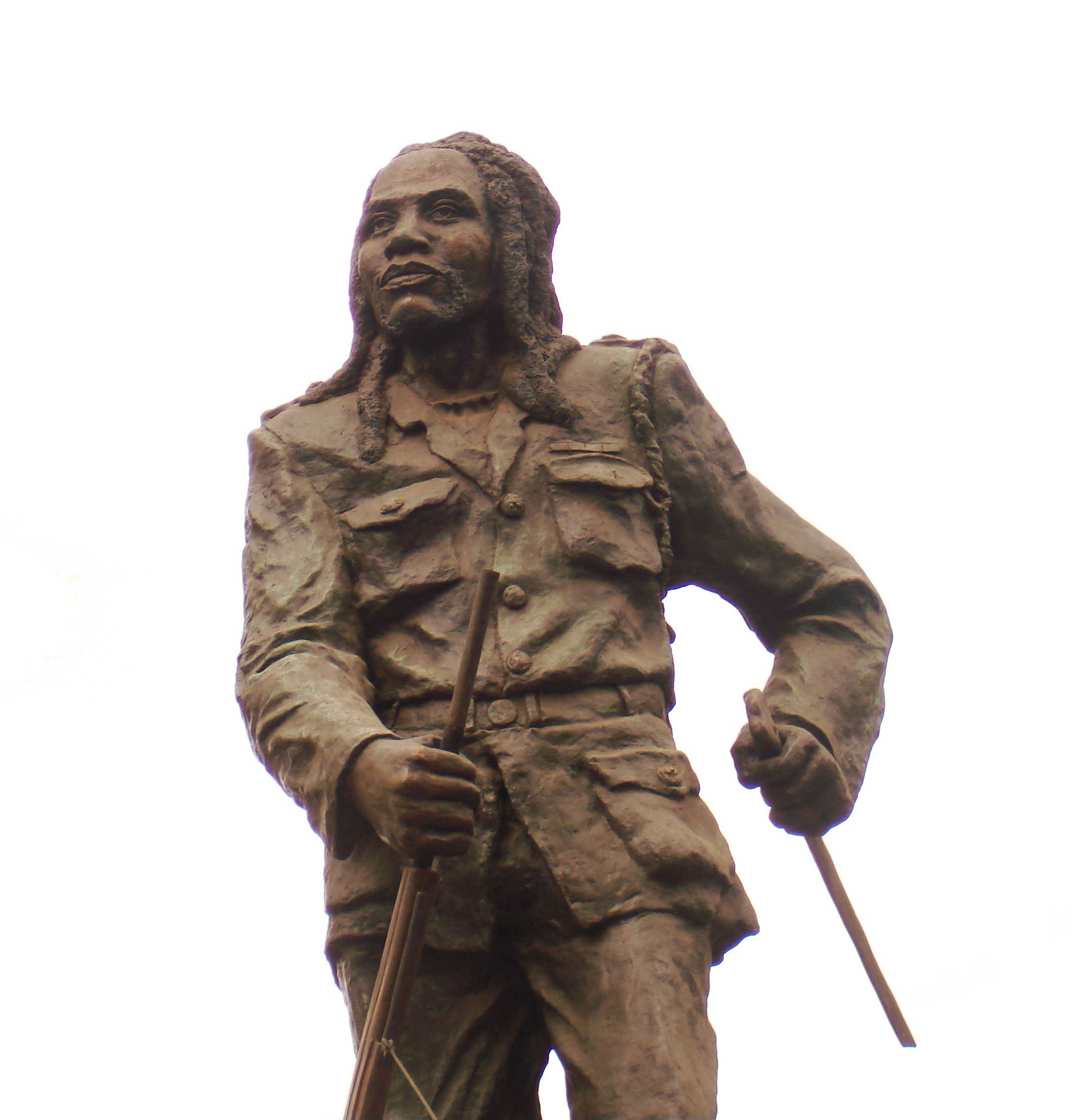
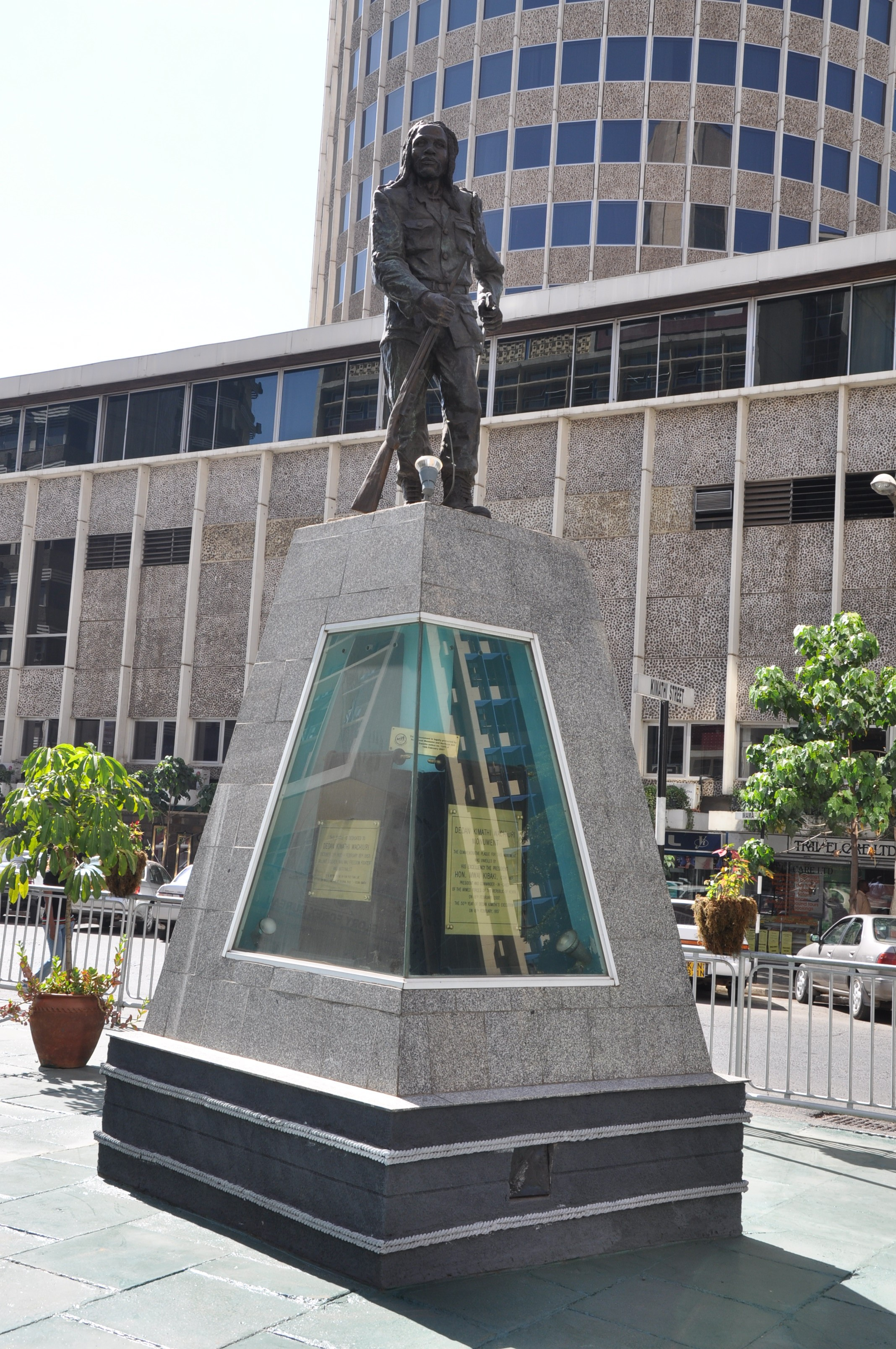
Dedan Kimathi statue in Nairobi

The Kibaki government erected a 2.1 metre bronze statue titled Freedom Fighter Dedan Kimathi on a graphite plinth, in central Nairobi. The statue is at the junction of Kimathi Street and Mama Ngina Street. Kimathi, clad in military regalia, holds a rifle in the right hand and a dagger in the left, the last weapons he held in his struggle. The foundation stone for the statue was laid by Vice President Awori on 11 December 2006 and the completed statue unveiled by President Kibaki on 18 February 2007 coinciding with the 50th anniversary of the day he was executed. In his remarks, Kibaki paid homage to Kimathi as a man who not only paid the ultimate price for Kenya's liberation but also inspired others to fight against oppression.

The statue attracted praise from Kenyans as a long overdue recognition of the Mau Mau for their part in the struggle for independence. This was in marked contrast to the post-colonial norm of the Jomo Kenyatta and Daniel Arap Moi governments' regard of the Mau Mau as terrorists.

On 12 September 2015, the British government unveiled a Mau Mau memorial statue in Nairobi's Uhuru Park that it funded "as a symbol of reconciliation between the British government, the Mau Mau, and all those who suffered". This followed a June 2013 decision by Britain to compensate more than 5,000 Kenyans tortured and abused during the Mau Mau insurgency.

=== Nelson Mandela ===
Kĩmathi was held in high regard by anti-apartheid leader Nelson Mandela. In July 1990, five months after his release from 27 years of imprisonment by South Africa's apartheid regime, Mandela visited Nairobi and requested to see Kimathi's grave and meet his widow Mũkami. Mandela's request was an embarrassing moment for the Moi administration, which had largely ignored Kĩmathi like Jomo Kenyatta's government before it. It was an awkward moment searching for her in the village where she and her family lived forgotten in poverty. Mandela's request was not met. During a public address at the Kasarani Stadium in Nairobi before he left the country, Mandela stated his admiration for Kimathi, Musa Mwariama, Waruhiu Itote, Kubu Kubu and other Mau Mau leaders who inspired his own struggle against injustice. It was only 15 years later in 2005, during his second visit to Kenya, that Mandela finally managed to meet Mukami as well as two of Kimathi's children.

Mandela's respect for Kimathi by the early 1960s is also alluded to in My Moment with a Legend by Ronnie Kasrils, the former intelligence chief of the ANC's armed wing Umkhonto We Sizwe (MK) and defence minister in Mandela's government.

=== Places named after Kĩmathi ===
- Dedan Kĩmathi University of Technology (Nyeri Country)
- Dedan Kĩmathi Stadium, Nyeri, Kenya (formerly known as Kamukunji Grounds)
- Kĩmathi Street, Nairobi, Kenya – One of the main roads in Nairobi's Central Business District and where there is a statue in his honor
- Dedan Kĩmathii Road, Lusaka, Zambia - Situated on this road is the Intercity Bus Terminus and ZCAS University.
- Kĩmathi Avenue, Kampala, Uganda
- Dedan Kĩmathi Road, Mombasa, Kenya
- Kĩmathi Road, Nyeri Town, Kenya
- Kĩmathi Road, Nanyuki Town, Kenya
- Dedan Kĩmathi Street, Embalenhle, Mpumalanga, South Africa
- Dedan Kĩmathi Memorial High School, Nyeri, Kenya
- Kĩmathi Crescent, Isamilo, Mwanza, Tanzania
- Kĩmathi Avenue, Eldoret, Kenya

== Popular culture and further reading ==
- The Trial of Dedan Kĩmathi (play) – Micere Mugo and Ngũgĩ wa Thiong'o
- Karimi, Joseph (2013). Dedan Kimathi: The Whole Story. Jomo Kenyatta Foundation.
- Mukami Kĩmathi (2017). Mau Mau Freedom Fighter. Mdahalo Bridging Divides Limited.
- Henderson, Ian; Philip Goodhart (1958). The Hunt for Kimathi. London: Hamish Hamilton. OCLC: 272575.
- Kahiga, Samuel (1990). Dedan Kimathi: The Real Story.
- Maina wa Kinyatti. Kenya's Freedom Struggle: The Dedan Kimathi Papers.
- Jabali Afrika (2011). Dedan Kĩmathi (song)
