= Ian Henderson (police officer) =

British police officer (1927–2013)

Ian Stuart McWalter Henderson, also known as Ian Stewart McWalter Henderson, CBE, GM & Bar, KPM (1927 – 13 April 2013) was a British citizen known for his role in resolving the Mau Mau crisis in Kenya in the late 1950s and for managing the Bahraini General Directorate for State Security Investigations from 1966 to 1998. Henderson was dubbed the "Butcher of Bahrain" due to torture and the numerous human rights violations that were alleged to have taken place under his command there, especially during the 1990s uprising in Bahrain.

Henderson was born in Aberdeenshire, Scotland, in 1927 but grew up among the Kikuyu in Kenya and lived most of his life overseas. He served as a Colonial Police Officer in Kenya during the 1950s and was famed for his role in capturing Mau Mau rebel leader Dedan Kimathi, about which he wrote the book, The Hunt for Kimathi, also published under the title Man Hunt in Kenya by Doubleday. In 1954 Henderson was awarded the George Medal, the second-highest award for bravery not in combat, and later a bar to the George Medal, for suppressing the Mau Mau uprising. "Ian Henderson has probably done more than any single individual to bring the Emergency to an end", wrote General Sir Gerald Lathbury when he left Kenya in 1957.

After independence, he was deported from Kenya and moved to Bahrain. He was employed as the head of the General Directorate for State Security Investigations in Bahrain for some 30 years, retiring from his position in February 1998. He was accused of complicity in torture during the period of protracted social unrest of 1990s uprising in Bahrain, leading to an investigation by British authorities in 2000. The investigation was concluded in August 2001 and no charges were filed, despite thorough documentation by Amnesty International and Human Rights Watch of the torture. He always denied any involvement in torture, despite the release of the documentary "Blind Eye to the Butcher" which contains evidence and interviews with the disfigured torture victims who identify Ian Henderson.

While chief of the Bahrain police, Ian Henderson personally interviewed North Korean agent Kim Hyon-hui and her accomplice Kim Seung-il. The pair had travelled to Bahrain posing as Japanese tourists after planting a bomb on Korean Air Flight 858. Henderson managed to prevent Hyon-hui from taking a cyanide pill secreted in a cigarette she was carrying.

== Honours ==
Ian Henderson was honoured by Queen Elizabeth II with the OBE (1984), George Medal (1954) (and Bar (1955)) and the King's Police and Fire Services Medal (1953). He was honoured by Government of Bahrain with The Order of Shaikh 'Isa bin Salman al-Khalifa (Wisam al-Shaikh 'Isa bin Salman Al Khalifa) Exceptional Class (2000), The Order of Bahrain (Wisam al-Bahrein) 1st Class (1983) and The Medal of Military Merit (Wissam al-Khidmat al-Askari) 1st Class (1982).

Ian Henderson's character was played by George Kennedy in the 1990 Korean film Mayumi, portraying his interrogation of Kim Hyon-hui.

== Death ==
Ian Henderson died on 13 April 2013 at the age of 86.
