= Musa Mwariama =

Kenyan revolutionary leader

- Born: Baringo M'Muchiri; 1928; Meru, Eastern Province, Kenya
- Died: 18 September 1993 (aged 65); Ukambani, Kenya
- Resting place: Kiambogo Village, Timau
- Other name: M'Kirigua M'Muchiri,
- Occupation: Soldier
- Known for: Field marshal during the Mau Mau uprising
- Spouse: Jacinta Kabika
- Children: 22

Musa Mwariama (1928–1993) was a Kenyan revolutionary leader of the Mau Mau in Meru and the highest-ranking Mau Mau leader who survived the war without being captured. Together with Field Marshal Dedan Kimathi, they comprised the core Mau Mau leadership. Mwariama was the highest ranking leader among the Meru side of the uprising.

By the time he left his bases in Mount Kenya and Nyambene Hills on the equator, he had about 2,000 fighters who had survived Operation Anvil in Kenya. He was decorated with the national Order of Elder of the Burning Spear (EBS) after independence. The most famous photograph of him is with President Jomo Kenyatta on attainment of Uhuru (independence) in 1963, and most of the post-war Mau Mau video clips show him inspecting a Mau Mau guard of honour or with President Jomo Kenyatta.

In 1984, President Daniel arap Moi awarded him the Head of State's Commendation (HSC).

== Early life ==
Baringo or M'Kirigua M'Muchiri, alias Musa Mwariama, later known as Field Marshal Mwariama, was born in 1928 at Muthara in Tigania division of Meru County.

According to Ameru tradition, his parents who had migrated from Nkuene in South Imenti, gave him the name Baringo. After his circumcision in 1942, and according to Meru tradition, his name had to be changed, and he was renamed M'Kirigua. He had an older brother called Romano Ntabathia though from a different mother. Their father, M'Muchiri was a soothsayer and strict traditionalist.

He was given the nickname "Mwariama" (the one who speaks the truth) while with the Mau Mau.

== Wives and children ==
Musa Mwariama married three times.

- His first wife was Cionabea M'Kirikua Mwariama. They married about 1948 while Musa was working as a security guard in Nairobi. Musa joined the Mau Mau movement when their first daughter was about three years old. Cionabea lost her eye after being tortured by British government soldiers when they raided their home in the 1950s looking for her husband. Musa and Cionabea had three daughters.
- In 1963, Musa married Jacinta Kabika (sometimes referred to as "Sacinta"), known as "General Nkobia". Jacinta was the mother of eleven children.
- His third wife was Salome Nyoroka from Kianjai village in his native Tigania. Musa and Salome had nine children: six sons and three daughters Their first child was born in the forest in 1963, the year of Kenya's independence. The rest were born after Independence.

== Death ==
Musa Mwariama died on 18 September 1993 at Ukambani after he sucked the leg of a friend who had been bitten by a venomous snake. He was buried at his 15-acre (6 ha) farm in Kiambogo Village, in Timau, North Buuri Constituency, Meru County.

His estate passed probate in 2007 at Meru, naming his wife "Jacinta Kabika Mwariama" of Timau, Kenya, as the executor.
