= Mau Mau rebellion =

Anti-colonial Insurgency in Kenya (1952–1960)

- Part of the decolonisation of Africa
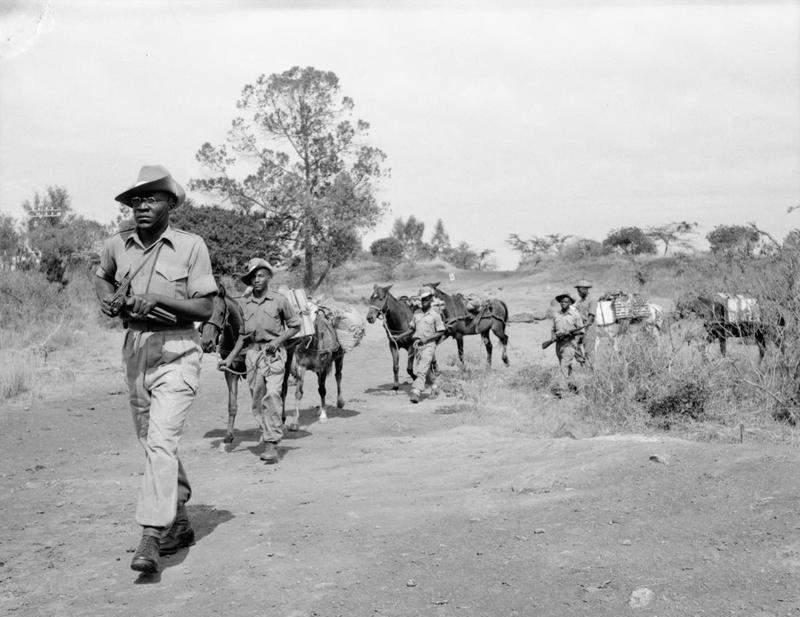
- Troops of the King's African Rifles on watch for Mau Mau rebels
| Date | Main conflict: 7 October 1952 – 21 October 1956 (4 years and 2 weeks); Mau Mau remnants: 1956–1960 |
| Location | British Kenya |
| Result | British victory |

Belligerents
| United Kingdom: Kenya; Uganda; Southern Rhodesia | Mau Mau rebels (Note: The name Kenya Land and Freedom Army is sometimes heard in connection with Mau Mau. KLFA was the name that Dedan Kimathi used for a coordinating body which he tried to set up for Mau Mau. It was also the name of another militant group that sprang up briefly in the spring of 1960; the group was broken up during a brief operation from 26 March to 30 April.): Kenya Land and Freedom Army; Maasai Bands (from 1954) |

Commanders and leaders
| (United Kingdom) Winston Churchill (1951–1955) (United Kingdom) Anthony Eden (1955–1957) (United Kingdom) Harold Macmillan (1957–1960) (United Kingdom) Ian Henderson (United Kingdom) George Erskine (United Kingdom) Kenneth O'Connor (Kenya Colony) Evelyn Baring (Kenya Colony) Terence Gavaghan | Dedan Kimathi (executed); Musa Mwariama; Waruhiu Itote; Stanley Mathenge (MIA); Kubu Kubu (executed) |

Strength
| 10,000 regular troops 21,000 police 25,000 Kikuyu Home Guard | 35,000+ insurgents |

Casualties and losses
| 3,000 native Kenyan police and soldiers killed 95 British military personnel killed | 12,000–20,000+ killed (including 1,090 executed); 2,633 captured 2,714 surrendered |

The Mau Mau rebellion (1952–1960), also known as the Mau Mau uprising or Kenya Emergency, was an armed conflict in the British Colony of Kenya between the Kenya Land and Freedom Army (KLFA, also known as the Mau Mau) and the British colonial authorities. While the KLFA was primarily composed of Kikuyu, Meru, and Embu fighters, the movement also drew support from units of Kamba and Maasai. Groups such as the Luo and Kalenjin – who had led significant earlier resistance movements against colonial establishment, such as the Nandi Resistance (1890–1906) were largely not part of the KLFA's core structure. Instead, many from these communities served in the King's African Rifles (KAR), the colonial military force through which the British maintained internal security and quelled the uprising. The KLFA fought against the British Army and the local Kenya Regiment, which included European settlers and African loyalists.

The capture of Field Marshal Dedan Kimathi on 21 October 1956 signalled the defeat of the Mau Mau, and essentially ended the British military campaign. However, the rebellion survived until after Kenya's independence from Britain, driven mainly by the Meru units led by Field Marshal Musa Mwariama. General Baimungi, one of the last Mau Mau leaders, was killed shortly after Kenya attained self-rule.

The KLFA failed to capture wide public support. Frank Füredi, in The Mau Mau War in Perspective, suggests this was due to a British divide and rule strategy, which they had developed in suppressing the Malayan Emergency (1948–60). The Mau Mau movement remained internally divided, despite attempts to unify the factions. On the colonial side, the uprising created a rift between the European colonial community in Kenya and the metropole, as well as violent divisions within the Kikuyu community: "Much of the struggle tore through the African communities themselves, an internecine war waged between rebels and 'loyalists' – Africans who took the side of the government and opposed Mau Mau." Suppressing the Mau Mau Uprising in the Kenyan colony cost Britain £55 million and caused at least 11,000 deaths among the Mau Mau and other forces, with some estimates considerably higher. This included 1,090 executions by hanging.

== Etymology ==
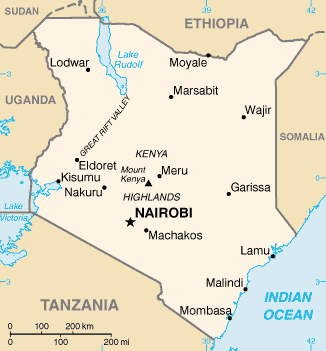
Map of Kenya

The origin of the term Mau Mau is uncertain. According to some members of Mau Mau, they never referred to themselves as such, instead preferring the military title Kenya Land and Freedom Army (KLFA). Some publications, such as Fred Majdalany's State of Emergency: The Full Story of Mau Mau, claim it was an anagram of Uma Uma (which means "Get out! Get out!") and was a military codeword based on a secret language game Kikuyu boys used to play at the time of their circumcision. Majdalany also says the British simply used the name as a label for the Kikuyu ethnic community without assigning any specific definition. However, there was a Maji Maji rebellion in German East Africa/Tanzania in 1905/6, ('Maji' meaning 'water' after a 'water-medicine') so this may be the origin of Mau Mau.

As the movement progressed, a Swahili backronym was adopted: "Mzungu Aende Ulaya, Mwafrika Apate Uhuru", meaning "Let the foreigner go back abroad, let the African regain independence". J. M. Kariuki, a member of Mau Mau who was detained during the conflict, suggests the British preferred to use the term Mau Mau instead of KLFA to deny the Mau Mau rebellion international legitimacy. Kariuki also wrote that the term Mau Mau was adopted by the rebellion in order to counter what they regarded as colonial propaganda.

Author and activist Wangari Maathai indicates that, to her, the most interesting story of the origin of the name is the Kikuyu phrase for the beginning of a list. When beginning a list in Kikuyu, one says, "maũndũ ni mau", "the main issues are...", and holds up three fingers to introduce them. Maathai says the three issues for the Mau Mau were land, freedom, and self-governance.

== Background ==
The principal item in the natural resources of Kenya is the land, and in this term we include the colony's mineral resources. It seems to us that our major objective must clearly be the preservation and the wise use of this most important asset.

— Deputy Governor to Secretary of State
for the Colonies, 19 March 1945

The armed rebellion of the Mau Mau was the culminating response to colonial rule. Although there had been previous instances of violent resistance to colonialism, the Mau Mau revolt was the most prolonged and violent anti-colonial warfare in the British Kenya colony. From the start, the land was the primary British interest in Kenya, which had "some of the richest agricultural soils in the world, mostly in districts where the elevation and climate make it possible for Europeans to reside permanently". Though declared a colony in 1920, the formal British colonial presence in Kenya began with a proclamation on 1 July 1895, in which Kenya was claimed as a British protectorate.

Even before 1895, however, Britain's presence in Kenya was marked by dispossession and violence. In 1894, British MP Sir Charles Dilke had observed in the House of Commons, "The only person who has up to the present time benefited from our enterprise in the heart of Africa has been Mr. Hiram Maxim" (inventor of the first automatic machine gun). During the period in which Kenya's interior was being forcibly opened up for British settlement, there was a great deal of conflict and British troops carried out atrocities against the native population.

Opposition to British imperialism had existed from the start of British occupation. The most notable include the Nandi Resistance led by Koitalel Arap Samoei of 1895–1905; the Giriama Uprising led by Mekatilili wa Menza of 1913–1914; the women's revolt against forced labour in Murang'a in 1947; and the Kolloa Affray of 1950. None of the armed uprisings during the beginning of British colonialism in Kenya were successful.

You may travel through the length and breadth of Kitui Reserve and you will fail to find in it any enterprise, building, or structure of any sort which Government has provided at the cost of more than a few sovereigns for the direct benefit of the natives. The place was little better than a wilderness when I first knew it 25 years ago, and it remains a wilderness to-day as far as our efforts are concerned. If we left that district to-morrow the only permanent evidence of our occupation would be the buildings we have erected for the use of our tax-collecting staff.

— Chief Native Commissioner of Kenya, 1925

Settler societies during the colonial period could own a disproportionate share of land. The first settlers arrived in 1902 as part of Governor Charles Eliot's plan to have a settler economy pay for the Uganda Railway. The success of this settler economy would depend heavily on the availability of land, labour and capital, and so, over the next three decades, the colonial government and settlers consolidated their control over Kenyan land, and forced native Kenyans to become wage labourers.

Until the mid-1930s, the two primary complaints were low native Kenyan wages and the requirement to carry an identity document, the kipande. From the early 1930s, however, two others began to come to prominence: effective and elected African-political-representation, and land. The British response to this clamour for agrarian reform came in the early 1930s when they set up the Carter Land Commission.

The Commission reported in 1934, but its conservative recommendations ended any prospect of a peaceful resolution to native land-hunger. The government seized approximately 7,000,000 acres of fertile land in the Central and Rift Valley regions, creating the 'White Highlands' exclusively for European settlement. While land was the primary grievance for the Kikuyu, the impact was equally acute for Kalenjin communities in the Rift Valley. In Kericho, the Kipsigis and Talai clans were evicted to make way for tea plantations; under the Laibon Removal Ordinance of 1934, the British deported the Talai clan to the Gwassi Hills in Nyanza. Simultaneously, the Ogiek people were systematically displaced from their ancestral forests in the Mau Escarpment to make way for government forest reserves and settler farmland. In Nyanza, the Commission restricted over 1 million Kenyans to 7,114 square miles while granting 16,700 square miles to 17,000 Europeans. The 1925 East Africa Commission also highlighted the 'very bad' treatment of the Giriama at the coast, who were repeatedly relocated to secure Crown land for settlers.

The Kikuyu, who lived in the Kiambu, Nyeri and Murang'a areas of what became Central Province, were one of the ethnic groups most affected by the colonial government's land expropriation and European settlement; by 1933, they had had over 109.5 square miles (284 km^{2}) of their potentially highly valuable land alienated. The Kikuyu mounted a legal challenge against the expropriation of their land, but a Kenya High Court decision of 1921 reaffirmed its legality. In terms of lost acreage, the Masai and Nandi people were the biggest losers of land.

The colonial government and white farmers also wanted cheap labour which, for a period, the government acquired from native Kenyans through force. Confiscating the land itself helped to create a pool of wage labourers, but the colony introduced measures that forced more native Kenyans to submit to wage labour: the introduction of the Hut and Poll Taxes (1901 and 1910 respectively); the establishment of reserves for each ethnic group, (Note: Though finalised in 1926, reserves were first instituted by the Crown Lands Ordinance of 1915.) which isolated ethnic groups and often exacerbated overcrowding; the discouragement of native Kenyans' growing cash crops; the Masters and Servants Ordinance (1906) and an identification pass known as the kipande (1918) to control the movement of labour and to curb desertion; and the exemption of wage labourers from forced labour and other detested obligations such as conscription.

=== Native labourer categories ===
Native Kenyan labourers were of three categories: squatter, contract, or casual. (Note: "Squatter or resident labourers are those who reside with their families on European farms usually for the purpose of work for the owners. ... Contract labourers are those who sign a contract of service before a magistrate, for periods varying from three to twelve months. Casual labourers leave their reserves to engage themselves to European employers for any period from one day upwards." In return for his services, a squatter was entitled to use some of the settler's land for cultivation and grazing. Contract and casual workers are together referred to as migratory labourers, in distinction to the permanent presence of the squatters on farms. The phenomenon of squatters arose in response to the complementary difficulties of Europeans in finding labourers and of Africans in gaining access to arable and grazing land.) By the end of World War I, squatters had become well established on European farms and plantations in Kenya, with Kikuyu squatters constituting the majority of agricultural workers on settler plantations. An unintended consequence of colonial rule, the squatters were targeted from 1918 onwards by a series of Resident Native Labourers Ordinances—criticised by at least some MPs—which progressively curtailed squatter rights and subordinated native Kenyan farming to that of the settlers. The Ordinance of 1939 finally eliminated squatters' remaining tenancy rights, and permitted settlers to demand 270 days' labour from any squatters on their land. and, after World War II, the situation for squatters deteriorated rapidly, a situation the squatters resisted fiercely.

In the early 1920s, though, despite the presence of 100,000 squatters and tens of thousands more wage labourers, there was still not enough native Kenyan labour available to satisfy the settlers' needs. The colonial government duly tightened the measures to force more Kenyans to become low-paid wage-labourers on settler farms.

The colonial government used the measures brought in as part of its land expropriation and labour 'encouragement' efforts to craft the third plank of its growth strategy for its settler economy: subordinating African farming to that of the Europeans. Nairobi also assisted the settlers with rail and road networks, subsidies on freight charges, agricultural and veterinary services, and credit and loan facilities. The near-total neglect of native farming during the first two decades of European settlement was noted by the East Africa Commission.

The resentment of colonial rule would not have been decreased by the wanting provision of medical services for native Kenyans, nor by the fact that in 1923, for example, "the maximum amount that could be considered to have been spent on services provided exclusively for the benefit of the native population was slightly over one-quarter of the taxes paid by them". The tax burden on Europeans in the early 1920s, meanwhile, was very light relative to their income. Interwar infrastructure-development was also largely paid for by the indigenous population.

Kenyan employees were often poorly treated by their European employers, with some settlers arguing that native Kenyans "were as children and should be treated as such". Some settlers flogged their servants for petty offences. To make matters even worse, native Kenyan workers were poorly served by colonial labour-legislation and a prejudiced legal-system. The vast majority of Kenyan employees' violations of labour legislation were settled with "rough justice" meted out by their employers. Most colonial magistrates appear to have been unconcerned by the illegal practice of settler-administered flogging; indeed, during the 1920s, flogging was the magisterial punishment-of-choice for native Kenyan convicts. The principle of punitive sanctions against workers was not removed from the Kenyan labour statutes until the 1950s.

The greater part of the wealth of the country is at present in our hands. ... This land we have made is our land by right—by right of achievement.

— Speech by Deputy Colonial Governor
30 November 1946

As a result of the situation in the highlands and growing job opportunities in the cities, thousands of Kikuyu migrated into cities in search of work, contributing to the doubling of Nairobi's population between 1938 and 1952. At the same time, there was a small, but growing, class of Kikuyu landowners who consolidated Kikuyu landholdings and forged ties with the colonial administration, leading to an economic rift within the Kikuyu.

== Mau Mau warfare ==
Mau Mau were the militant wing of a growing clamour for political representation and freedom in Kenya. The first attempt to form a countrywide political party began on 1 October 1944. This fledgling organisation was called the Kenya African Study Union (KASU). Harry Thuku was the first chairman, but he soon resigned. There is dispute over Thuku's reason for leaving KASU: Bethwell Ogot says Thuku "found the responsibility too heavy"; David Anderson states that "he walked out in disgust" as the militant section of KASU took the initiative. KASU changed its name to the Kenya African Union (KAU) in 1946. Author Wangari Maathai writes that many of the organizers were ex-soldiers who fought for the British in Ceylon, Somalia, and Burma during the Second World War. When they returned to Kenya, they were never paid and did not receive recognition for their service, whereas their British counterparts were awarded medals and received land, sometimes from the Kenyan veterans.

The failure of KAU to attain any significant reforms or redress of grievances from the colonial authorities shifted the political initiative to younger and more militant figures within the native Kenyan trade union movement, among the squatters on the settler estates in the Rift Valley and in KAU branches in Nairobi and the Kikuyu districts of central province. Around 1943, residents of Olenguruone Settlement radicalised the traditional practice of oathing, and extended oathing to women and children. By the mid-1950s, 90% of Kikuyu, Embu and Meru were oathed. On 3 October 1952, Mau Mau claimed their first European victim when they stabbed a woman to death near her home in Thika. Six days later, on 9 October, Senior Chief Waruhiu was shot dead in broad daylight in his car, which was an important blow against the colonial government. Waruhiu had been one of the strongest supporters of the British presence in Kenya. His assassination gave Evelyn Baring the final impetus to request permission from the Colonial Office to declare a State of Emergency.

The Mau Mau attacks were mostly well organised and planned.

...the insurgents' lack of heavy weaponry and the heavily entrenched police and Home Guard positions meant that Mau Mau attacks were restricted to nighttime and where loyalist positions were weak. When attacks did commence they were fast and brutal, as insurgents were easily able to identify loyalists because they were often local to those communities themselves. The Lari massacre was by comparison rather outstanding and in contrast to regular Mau Mau strikes which more often than not targeted only loyalists without such massive civilian casualties. "Even the attack upon Lari, in the view of the rebel commanders was strategic and specific."

The Mau Mau command, contrary to the Home Guard who were stigmatised as "the running dogs of British Imperialism", were relatively well educated. General Gatunga had previously been a respected and well-read Christian teacher in his local Kikuyu community. He was known to meticulously record his attacks in a series of five notebooks, which when executed were often swift and strategic, targeting loyalist community leaders he had previously known as a teacher.

The Mau Mau military strategy was mainly guerrilla attacks launched under the cover of darkness. They used improvised and stolen weapons such as guns, as well as weapons such as machetes and bows and arrows in their attacks. They maimed cattle and, in one case, poisoned a herd.

In addition to physical warfare, the Mau Mau rebellion also generated a propaganda war, where both the British and Mau Mau fighters battled for the hearts and minds of Kenya's population. Mau Mau propaganda represented the apex of an 'information war' that had been fought since 1945, between colonial information staff and African intellectuals and newspaper editors. The Mau Mau had learned much from - and built upon - the experience and advice of newspaper editors since 1945. In some cases, the editors of various publications in the colony were directly involved in producing Mau Mau propaganda. British Officials struggled to compete with the 'hybrid, porous, and responsive character' during the rebellion, and faced the same challenges in responding to Mau Mau propaganda, particularly in instances where the Mau Mau would use creative ways such as hymns to win and maintain followers. This was far more effective than government newspapers; however, once colonial officials brought the insurgency under control by late 1954, information officials gained an uncontested arena through which they won the propaganda war.

Women formed a core part of the Mau Mau, especially in maintaining supply lines. Initially able to avoid the suspicion, they moved through colonial spaces and between Mau Mau hideouts and strongholds, to deliver vital supplies and services to guerrilla fighters including food, ammunition, medical care, and of course, information. Women such as Wamuyu Gakuru, exemplified this key role. An unknown number also fought in the war, with the most high-ranking being Field Marshal Muthoni.

However, historical accounts often lack nuance in terms of female experience within the Mau Mau rebellion, and they did not consult female memories until a quarter of a century later. Most women acted as mothers and sisters, which proved crucial to the war effort of Mau Mau. They rarely became fighters themselves, but the war consequently facilitated autonomy, as if often familiar of gender relations during wartime. However, female pain and oppression still accompanied the rebellion. One account from Wangui, the Kabutini or 'little platoon' who was assigned to look after Njama's needs, accepted the household and sexual duties that Mau Mau required from her stating: 'Wherever I might go under the sun, I think these same duties would follow me.'

== British reaction ==
The British and international view was that Mau Mau was a savage, violent, and depraved tribal cult, an expression of unrestrained emotion rather than reason. Mau Mau was "perverted tribalism" that sought to take the Kikuyu people back to "the bad old days" before British rule. The official British explanation of the revolt did not include the insights of agrarian and agricultural experts, of economists and historians, or even of Europeans who had spent a long period living amongst the Kikuyu such as Louis Leakey. Not for the first time, the British instead relied on the purported insights of the ethnopsychiatrist; with Mau Mau, it fell to J. C. Carothers to perform the desired analysis. This ethnopsychiatric analysis guided British psychological warfare, which painted Mau Mau as "an irrational force of evil, dominated by bestial impulses and influenced by world communism", and the later official study of the uprising, the Corfield Report.

The psychological war became of critical importance to military and civilian leaders who tried to "emphasise that there was in effect a civil war, and that the struggle was not black versus white", attempting to isolate Mau Mau from the Kikuyu, and the Kikuyu from the rest of the colony's population and the world outside. In driving a wedge between Mau Mau and the Kikuyu generally, these propaganda efforts essentially played no role, though they could apparently claim an important contribution to the isolation of Mau Mau from the non-Kikuyu sections of the population.

By the mid-1960s, the view of Mau Mau as simply irrational activists was being challenged by memoirs of former members and leaders that portrayed Mau Mau as an essential, if radical, component of African nationalism in Kenya and by academic studies that analysed the movement as a modern and nationalist response to the unfairness and oppression of colonial domination.

There continues to be vigorous debate within Kenyan society and among the academic community within and outside Kenya regarding the nature of Mau Mau and its aims, as well as the response to and effects of the uprising. Nevertheless, partly because as many Kikuyu fought against Mau Mau on the side of the colonial government as joined them in rebellion, the conflict is now often regarded in academic circles as an intra-Kikuyu civil war, a characterisation that remains extremely unpopular in Kenya. In August 1952, Kenyatta told a Kikuyu audience "Mau Mau has spoiled the country...Let Mau Mau perish forever. All people should search for Mau Mau and kill it". Kenyatta described the conflict in his memoirs as a civil war rather than a rebellion. One reason that the revolt was largely limited to the Kikuyu people was, in part, that they had suffered the most as a result of the negative aspects of British colonialism.

Wunyabari O. Maloba regards the rise of the Mau Mau movement as "without doubt, one of the most important events in recent African history". David Anderson, however, considers Maloba's and similar work to be the product of "swallowing too readily the propaganda of the Mau Mau war", noting the similarity between such analysis and the "simplistic" earlier studies of Mau Mau. This earlier work cast the Mau Mau war in strictly bipolar terms, "as conflicts between anti-colonial nationalists and colonial collaborators". Caroline Elkins' 2005 study, Imperial Reckoning, awarded the 2006 Pulitzer Prize for General Nonfiction, was also controversial in that she was accused of presenting an equally binary portrayal of the conflict and of drawing questionable conclusions from limited census data, in particular her assertion that the victims of British punitive measures against the Kikuyu amounted to as many as 300,000 dead. While Elstein regards the "requirement" for the "great majority of Kikuyu" to live inside 800 "fortified villages" as "serv[ing] the purpose of protection", Professor David Anderson (amongst others) regards the "compulsory resettlement" of "1,007,500 Kikuyu" inside what, for the "most" part, were "little more than concentration camps" as "punitive ... to punish Mau Mau sympathisers".

It is often assumed that in a conflict there are two sides in opposition to one another, and that a person who is not actively committed to one side must be supporting the other. During the course of a conflict, leaders on both sides will use this argument to gain active support from the "crowd". In reality, conflicts involving more than two persons usually have more than two sides, and if a resistance movement is to be successful, propaganda and politicization are essential.

— Louise Pirouet

Broadly speaking, throughout Kikuyu history, there have been two traditions: moderate-conservative and radical. Despite the differences between them, there has been a continuous debate and dialogue between these traditions, leading to a great political awareness among the Kikuyu. By 1950, these differences, and the impact of colonial rule, had given rise to three native Kenyan political blocs: conservative, moderate nationalist and militant nationalist. It has also been argued that Mau Mau was not explicitly national, either intellectually or operationally.

Bruce Berman argues that, "While Mau Mau was clearly not a tribal atavism seeking a return to the past, the answer to the question of 'was it nationalism?' must be yes and no." As the Mau Mau rebellion wore on, the violence forced the spectrum of opinion within the Kikuyu, Embu and Meru to polarise and harden into the two distinct camps of loyalist and Mau Mau. This neat division between loyalists and Mau Mau was a product of the conflict, rather than a cause or catalyst of it, with the violence becoming less ambiguous over time, in a similar manner to other situations.

=== British reaction to the uprising ===
Between 1952 and 1956, when the fighting was at its worst, the Kikuyu districts of Kenya became a police state in the very fullest sense of that term.

— David Anderson

Philip Mitchell retired as Kenya's governor in summer 1952, having turned a blind eye to Mau Mau's increasing activity. Through the summer of 1952, however, Colonial Secretary Oliver Lyttelton in London received a steady flow of reports from Acting Governor Henry Potter about the escalating seriousness of Mau Mau violence, but it was not until the later part of 1953 that British politicians began to accept that the rebellion was going to take some time to deal with. At first, the British discounted the Mau Mau rebellion because of their own technical and military superiority, which encouraged hopes for a quick victory.

The British army accepted the gravity of the uprising months before the politicians, but its appeals to London and Nairobi were ignored. On 30 September 1952, Evelyn Baring arrived in Kenya to permanently take over from Potter; Baring was given no warning by Mitchell or the Colonial Office about the gathering maelstrom into which he was stepping.

He later received communication from the colony's chief native commissioner, citing that Mau Mau had captured control over the three Kikuyu districts, and that the movement was structurally anti-European and primitive. The Report assumed Jomo Kenyatta as the orchestrator of the rebellion, despite lack of credible evidence. Baring later travelled the Kikuyu areas outside of Nairobi. When he arrived at Kandara, he later recalled "Ive never seen such faces, they were scowling, they looked unhappy, they were intensely suspicious. It was an expression I saw a great deal during the early years of Mau Mau." Historian Elkins noted that there was no evidence that Baring accepted the genuine economic or social drivers of Mau Mau frustration; from his arrival in Kenya, he characterised Mau Mau as an illegitimate movement. As Baring spoke, "if you don't get Kenyatta and those all-round him and shut them up somehow or other, we are in a terrible, hopeless position."

Aside from military operations against Mau Mau fighters in the forests, the British attempt to defeat the movement broadly came in two stages: the first, relatively limited in scope, came during the period in which they had still failed to accept the seriousness of the revolt; the second came afterwards. During the first stage, the British tried to decapitate the movement by declaring a State of Emergency before arresting 180 alleged Mau Mau leaders in Operation Jock Scott and subjecting six of them (the Kapenguria Six) to a show trial; the second stage began in earnest in 1954, when they undertook a series of major economic, military and penal initiatives.

The second stage had three main planks: a large military-sweep of Nairobi leading to the internment of tens of thousands of the city's suspected Mau Mau members and sympathisers ( Operation Anvil); the enacting of major agrarian reform (the Swynnerton Plan); and the institution of a vast villagisation programme for more than a million rural Kikuyu. In 2012, the UK government accepted that prisoners had suffered "torture and ill-treatment at the hands of the colonial administration".

The harshness of the British response was inflated by two factors. First, the settler government in Kenya was, even before the insurgency, probably the most openly racist one in the British empire, with the settlers' violent prejudice attended by an uncompromising determination to retain their grip on power and half-submerged fears that, as a tiny minority, they could be overwhelmed by the indigenous population. Its representatives were so keen on aggressive action that George Erskine referred to them as "the White Mau Mau". Second, the brutality of Mau Mau attacks on civilians made it easy for the movement's opponents—including native Kenyan and loyalist security forces—to adopt a totally dehumanised view of Mau Mau adherents.

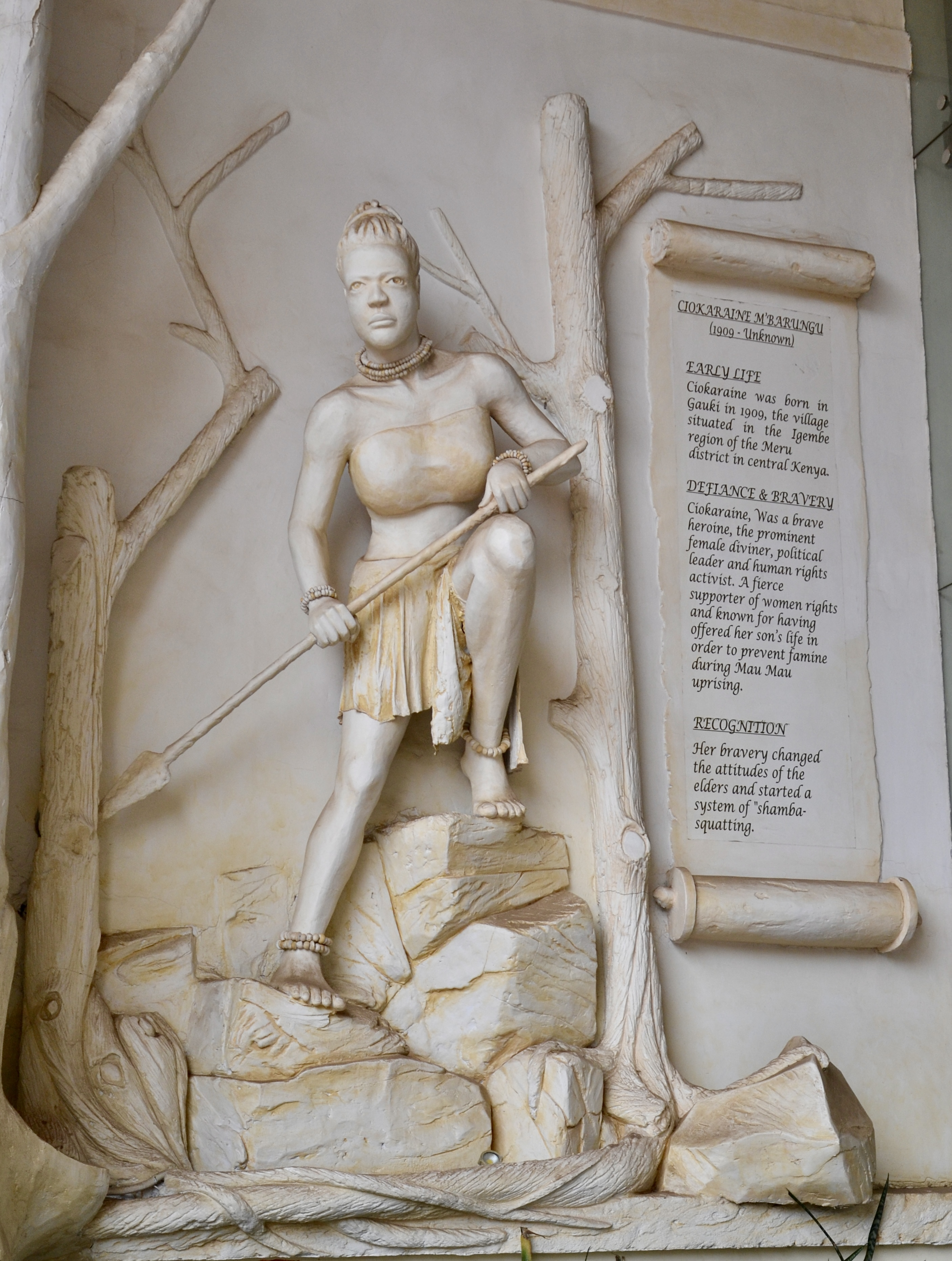
Sculpture of Ciokaraine M’Barungu at Nairobi

Resistance to both the Mau Mau and the British response was illustrated by Ciokaraine M'Barungu who famously asked that the British colonial forces not destroy the food used by her villagers, since its destruction could potentially starve the entire region. Instead, she urged the colonial forces to guard the yams and bananas and stop the Mau Mau from killing any more residents.

A variety of coercive techniques were initiated by the colonial authorities to punish and break Mau Mau's support: Baring ordered punitive communal-labour, collective fines and other collective punishments, and further confiscation of land and property. By early 1954, tens of thousands of head of livestock had been taken, and were allegedly never returned. Detailed accounts of the policy of seizing livestock from Kenyans suspected of supporting Mau Mau rebels were finally released in April 2012.

=== The Mau Mau State of Emergency (20 October, 1952) ===
On 20 October 1952, the British aimed to silence the movement by declaring a State of Emergency enacted by Governor Baring. Operation Jock Scott, meant Kenya's state of emergency was officially declared, the code-named assault was built to target Jomo Kenyatta, and 180 other identified leaders of Mau Mau. In the early morning of October 21, 1952, masses of Kenyan policemen, both white and black, arrested large groups of Mau Mau adherents, such as Paul Ngei, Fred Kubai, and Bildad Kaggia, where they were transported to the Nairobi police station. Jomo Kenyatta received different treatment, he was escorted from his home in the middle of the night and driven to a waiting plane stationed at the military airfield outside of Nairobi. He was convinced he was going to be ejected into the forest below, where he believed his body would never be recovered; instead, he soon found himself four hundred miles North of Nairobi, in a remote place called Lokitaung.

The day after the round up, another prominent loyalist chief, Nderi, was hacked to pieces, and a series of gruesome murders against settlers were committed throughout the months that followed. The violent and random nature of British tactics during the months after Jock Scott served merely to alienate ordinary Kikuyu and drive many of the wavering majority into Mau Mau's arms. Three battalions of the King's African Rifles were recalled from Uganda, Tanganyika and Mauritius, giving the regiment five battalions in all in Kenya, a total of 3,000 native Kenyan troops. To placate settler opinion, one battalion of British troops, from the Lancashire Fusiliers, was also flown in from Egypt to Nairobi on the first day of Operation Jock Scott. In November 1952, Baring requested assistance from the MI5 Security Service. For the next year, the Service's A.M. MacDonald would reorganise the Special Branch of the Kenya Police, promote collaboration with Special Branches in adjacent territories, and oversee coordination of all intelligence activity "to secure the intelligence Government requires".

Our sources have produced nothing to indicate that Kenyatta, or his associates in the UK, are directly involved in Mau Mau activities, or that Kenyatta is essential to Mau Mau as a leader, or that he is in a position to direct its activities.

— Percy Sillitoe, Director General of MI5
Letter to Evelyn Baring, 9 January 1953

In January 1953, six of the most prominent detainees from Jock Scott, including Kenyatta, were put on trial, primarily to justify the declaration of the Emergency to critics in London. The trial itself was claimed to have featured a suborned lead defence-witness, a bribed judge, and other serious violations of the right to a fair trial.

Native Kenyan political activity was permitted to resume at the end of the military phase of the Emergency.

=== Military operations ===
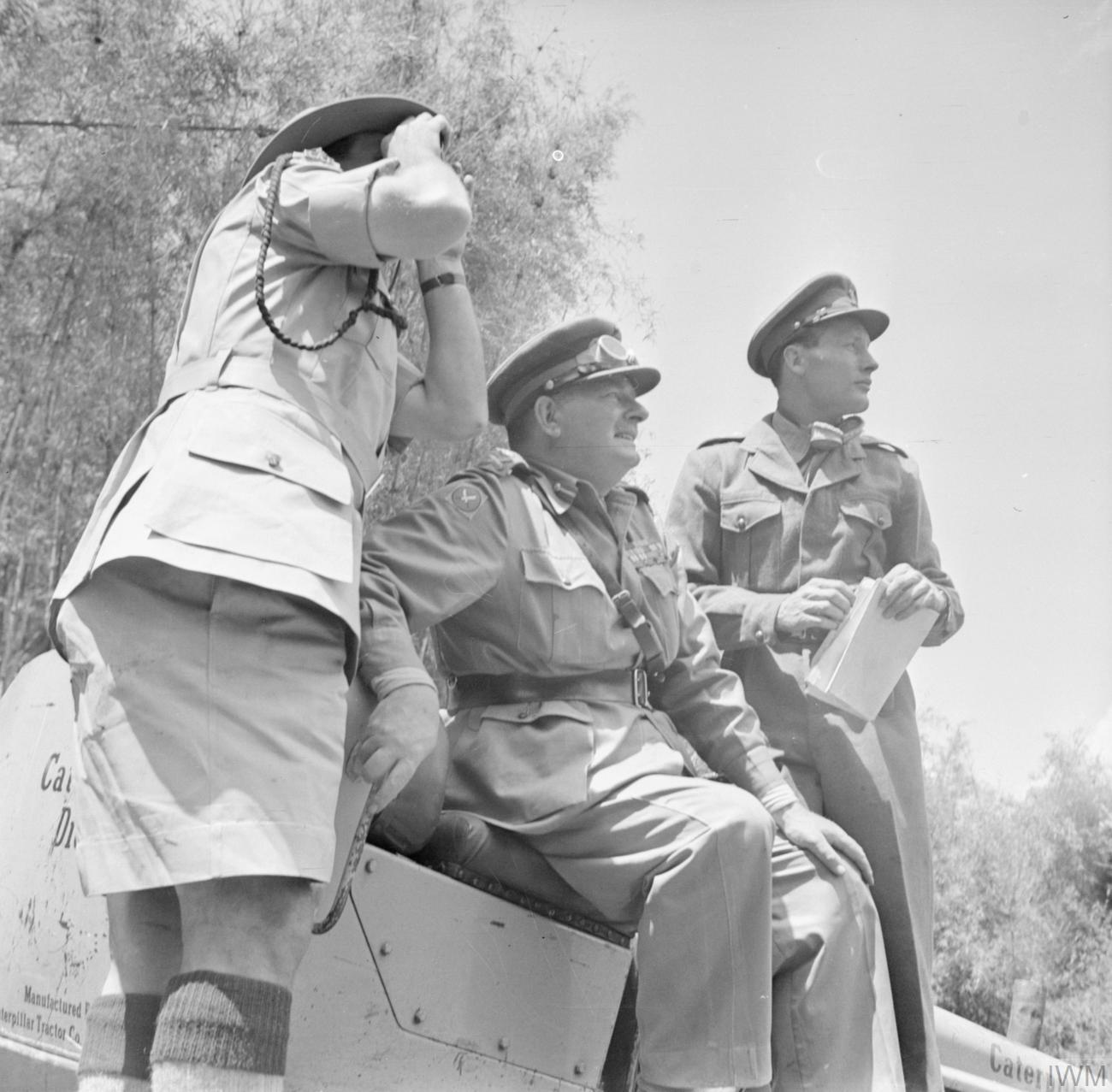
Lieutenant General Sir George Erskine, Commander-in-Chief, East Africa Command (centre), observing operations against the Mau Mau

The onset of the Emergency led hundreds, and eventually thousands, of Mau Mau adherents to flee to the forests, where a decentralised leadership had already begun setting up platoons. The primary zones of Mau Mau military strength were the Aberdares and the forests around Mount Kenya, whilst a passive support-wing was fostered outside these areas. Militarily, the British defeated Mau Mau in four years (1952–1956) using a more expansive version of "coercion through exemplary force". In May 1953, the decision was made to send General George Erskine to oversee the restoration of order in the colony.

By September 1953, the British knew the leading personalities in Mau Mau, and the capture and 68 hour interrogation of General China on 15 January the following year provided a massive intelligence boost on the forest fighters. Erskine's arrival did not immediately herald a fundamental change in strategy, thus the continual pressure on the gangs remained, but he created more mobile formations that delivered what he termed "special treatment" to an area. Once gangs had been driven out and eliminated, loyalist forces and police were then to take over the area, with military support brought in thereafter only to conduct any required pacification operations. After their successful dispersion and containment, Erskine went after the forest fighters' source of supplies, money and recruits, i.e. the native Kenyan population of Nairobi. This took the form of Operation Anvil, which commenced on 24 April 1954.

==== Operation Anvil ====
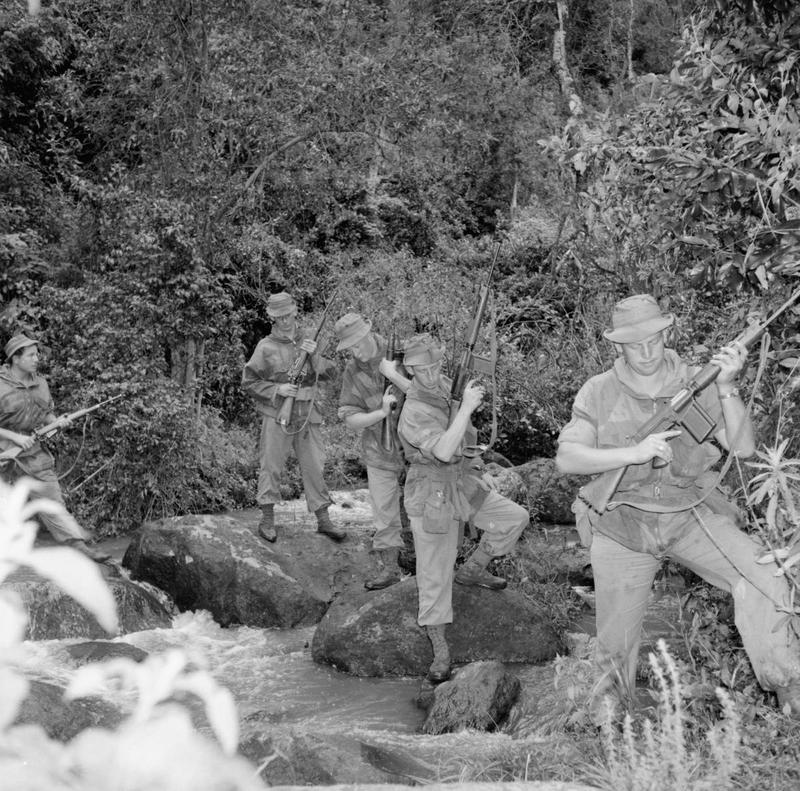
British Army patrol crossing a stream carrying L1A1 Self-Loading Rifles (1st and 2nd soldiers from right); Sten Mk5 (3rd soldier); and the Lee–Enfield No. 5 (4th and 5th soldiers)

By 1954, Nairobi was regarded as the nerve centre of Mau Mau operations. The insurgents in the highlands of the Aberdares and Mt Kenya were being supplied provisions and weapons by supporters in Nairobi via couriers. Anvil was the ambitious attempt to eliminate Mau Mau's presence within Nairobi in one fell swoop. 25,000 members of British security forces under the control of General George Erskine were deployed as Nairobi was sealed off and underwent a sector-by-sector purge. All native Kenyans were taken to temporary barbed-wire enclosures. Those who were not Kikuyu, Embu or Meru were released; those who were remained in detention for screening. (Note: During the Emergency, screening was the term used by colonial authorities to mean the interrogation of a Mau Mau suspect. The alleged member or sympathiser of Mau Mau would be interrogated in order to obtain an admission of guilt—specifically, a confession that they had taken the Mau Mau oath—as well as for intelligence.)

Whilst the operation itself was conducted by Europeans, most suspected members of Mau Mau were picked out of groups of the Kikuyu-Embu-Meru detainees by a native Kenyan informer. Male suspects were then taken off for further screening, primarily at Langata Screening Camp, whilst women and children were readied for 'repatriation' to the reserves (many of those slated for deportation had never set foot in the reserves before). Anvil lasted for two weeks, after which the capital had been cleared of all but certifiably loyal Kikuyu; 20,000 Mau Mau suspects had been taken to Langata, and 30,000 more had been deported to the reserves.

==== Air power ====
For an extended period of time, the chief British weapon against the forest fighters was air power. Between June 1953 and October 1955, the RAF provided a significant contribution to the conflict—and, indeed, had to, for the army was preoccupied with providing security in the reserves until January 1955, and it was the only service capable of both psychologically influencing and inflicting considerable casualties on the Mau Mau fighters operating in the dense forests. Lack of timely and accurate intelligence meant bombing was rather haphazard, but almost 900 insurgents had been killed or wounded by air attacks by June 1954, and it did cause forest gangs to disband, lower their morale, and induce their pronounced relocation from the forests to the reserves.

At first armed Harvard training aircraft were used, for direct ground support and also some camp interdiction. As the campaign developed, Avro Lincoln heavy bombers were deployed, flying missions in Kenya from 18 November 1953 to 28 July 1955, dropping nearly 6 million bombs. They and other aircraft, such as blimps, were also deployed for reconnaissance, as well as in the propaganda war, conducting large-scale leaflet-drops. A flight of de Havilland Vampire jets flew in from Aden, but were used for only ten days of operations. Some light aircraft of the Police Air Wing also provided support.

After the Lari massacre for example, British planes dropped leaflets showing graphic pictures of the Kikuyu women and children who had been hacked to death. Unlike the rather indiscriminate activities of British ground forces, the use of air power was more restrained (though there is disagreement on this point), and air attacks were initially permitted only in the forests. Operation Mushroom extended bombing beyond the forest limits in May 1954, and Churchill consented to its continuation in January 1955.

=== Swynnerton Plan ===
Baring knew the massive deportations to the already-overcrowded reserves could only make things worse. Refusing to give more land to the Kikuyu in the reserves, which could have been seen as a concession to Mau Mau, Baring turned instead in 1953 to Roger Swynnerton, Kenya's assistant director of agriculture. The primary goal of the Swynnerton Plan was the creation of family holdings large enough to keep families self-sufficient in food and to enable them to practise alternate husbandry, which would generate a cash income.

The projected costs of the Swynnerton Plan were too high for the cash-strapped colonial government, so Baring tweaked repatriation and augmented the Swynnerton Plan with plans for a massive expansion of the Pipeline coupled with a system of work camps to make use of detainee labour. All Kikuyu employed for public works projects would now be employed on Swynnerton's poor-relief programmes, as would many detainees in the work camps.

=== Detention programme ===
It would be difficult to argue that the colonial government envisioned its own version of a gulag when the Emergency first started. Colonial officials in Kenya and Britain all believed that Mau Mau would be over in less than three months.

— Caroline Elkins

When the mass deportations of Kikuyu to the reserves began in 1953, Baring and Erskine ordered all Mau Mau suspects to be screened. Of the scores of screening camps which sprang up, only fifteen were officially sanctioned by the colonial government. Larger detention camps were divided into compounds. The screening centres were staffed by settlers who had been appointed temporary district-officers by Baring.

Thomas Askwith, the official tasked with designing the British 'detention and rehabilitation' programme during the summer and autumn of 1953, termed his system the Pipeline. The British did not initially conceive of rehabilitating Mau Mau suspects through brute force and other ill-treatment—Askwith's final plan, submitted to Baring in October 1953, was intended as "a complete blueprint for winning the war against Mau Mau using socioeconomic and civic reform". What developed, however, has been described as a British gulag. (Note: The term gulag is used by David Anderson and Caroline Elkins. For Anderson, see his 2005 Histories of the Hanged, p. 7: "Virtually every one of the acquitted men ... would spend the next several years in the notorious detention camps of the Kenyan gulag"; for Elkins, see Elkins 2005)

The Pipeline operated a white-grey-black classification system: 'whites' were co-operative detainees, and were repatriated back to the reserves; 'greys' had been oathed but were reasonably compliant, and were moved down the Pipeline to works camps in their local districts before release; and 'blacks' were the 'hard core' of Mau Mau. These were moved up the Pipeline to special detention camps. Thus a detainee's position in Pipeline was a straightforward reflection of how cooperative the Pipeline personnel deemed her or him to be. Cooperation was itself defined in terms of a detainee's readiness to confess their Mau Mau oath. Detainees were screened and re-screened for confessions and intelligence, then re-classified accordingly.

[T]here is something peculiarly chilling about the way colonial officials behaved, most notoriously but not only in Kenya, within a decade of the liberation of the [Nazi] concentration camps and the return of thousands of emaciated British prisoners of war from the Pacific. One courageous judge in Nairobi explicitly drew the parallel: Kenya's Belsen, he called one camp.

— Guardian Editorial, 11 April 2011

A detainee's journey between two locations along the Pipeline could sometimes last days. During transit, there was frequently little or no food and water provided, and seldom any sanitation. Once in camp, talking was forbidden outside the detainees' accommodation huts, though improvised communication was rife. Such communication included propaganda and disinformation, which went by such names as the Kinongo Times, designed to encourage fellow detainees not to give up hope and so to minimise the number of those who confessed their oath and cooperated with camp authorities. Forced labour was performed by detainees on projects like the thirty-seven-mile-long South Yatta irrigation furrow. Family outside and other considerations led many detainees to confess.

During the first year after Operation Anvil, colonial authorities had little success in forcing detainees to co-operate. Camps and compounds were overcrowded, forced-labour systems were not yet perfected, screening teams were not fully coordinated, and the use of torture was not yet systematised. This failure was partly due to the lack of manpower and resources, as well as the vast numbers of detainees. Officials could scarcely process them all, let alone get them to confess their oaths. Assessing the situation in the summer of 1955, Alan Lennox-Boyd wrote of his "fear that the net figure of detainees may still be rising. If so the outlook is grim." Black markets flourished during this period, with the native Kenyan guards helping to facilitate trading. It was possible for detainees to bribe guards in order to obtain items or stay punishment.

[T]he horror of some of the so-called Screening Camps now present a state of affairs so deplorable that they should be investigated without delay, so that the ever increasing allegations of inhumanity and disregard of the rights of the African citizen are dealt with and so that the Government will have no reason to be ashamed of the acts which are done in its own name by its own servants.

— Letter from Police Commissioner Arthur Young to Governor Evelyn Baring, 22 November 1954

==== Interrogations and confessions ====
By late 1955, however, the Pipeline had become a fully operational, well-organised system. Guards were regularly shifted around the Pipeline too in order to prevent relationships developing with detainees and so undercut the black markets, and inducements and punishments became better at discouraging fraternising with the enemy. The grinding nature of the improved detention and interrogation regimen began to produce results. Most detainees confessed, and the system produced ever greater numbers of spies and informers within the camps, while others switched sides in a more open, official fashion, leaving detention behind to take an active role in interrogations, even sometimes administering beatings.

The most famous example of side-switching was Peter Muigai Kenyatta—Jomo Kenyatta's son—who, after confessing, joined screeners at Athi River Camp, later travelling throughout the Pipeline to assist in interrogations. Suspected informers and spies within a camp were treated in the time-honoured Mau Mau fashion: the preferred method of execution was strangulation then mutilation: "It was just like in the days before our detention", explained one Mau Mau member later. "We did not have our own jails to hold an informant in, so we would strangle him and then cut his tongue out." The end of 1955 also saw screeners being given a freer hand in interrogation, and harsher conditions than straightforward confession were imposed on detainees before they were deemed 'cooperative' and eligible for final release.

In a half-circle against the reed walls of the enclosure stand eight young, African women. There's neither hate nor apprehension in their gaze. It's like a talk in the headmistress's study; a headmistress who is firm but kindly.

— A contemporary BBC-description of screening

While oathing, for practical reasons, within the Pipeline was reduced to an absolute minimum, as many new initiates as possible were oathed. A newcomer who refused to take the oath often faced the same fate as a recalcitrant outside the camps: they were murdered. "The detainees would strangle them with their blankets or, using blades fashioned from the corrugated-iron roofs of some of the barracks, would slit their throats", writes Elkins. The camp authorities' preferred method of capital punishment was public hanging. Commandants were told to clamp down hard on intra-camp oathing, with several commandants hanging anyone suspected of administering oaths.

Even as the Pipeline became more sophisticated, detainees still organised themselves within it, setting up committees and selecting leaders for their camps, as well as deciding on their own "rules to live by". Perhaps the most famous compound leader was Josiah Mwangi Kariuki. Punishments for violating the "rules to live by" could be severe.

European missionaries and native Kenyan Christians played their part by visiting camps to evangelise and encourage compliance with the colonial authorities, providing intelligence, and sometimes even assisting in interrogation. Detainees regarded such preachers with nothing but contempt.

The number of cases of pulmonary tuberculosis which is being disclosed in Prison and Detention Camps is causing some embarrassment.

— Memorandum to Commissioner of Prisons John 'Taxi' Lewis
from Kenya's Director of Medical Services, 18 May 1954

The lack of decent sanitation in the camps meant that epidemics of diseases such as typhoid, dysentery and tuberculosis swept through them. Detainees would also develop vitamin deficiencies, for example scurvy, due to the poor rations provided. Official medical reports detailing the shortcomings of the camps and their recommendations were ignored, and the conditions being endured by detainees were lied about and denied. A British rehabilitation officer found in 1954 that detainees from Manyani were in "shocking health", many of them suffering from malnutrition, while Langata and GilGil were eventually closed in April 1955 because, as the colonial government put it, "they were unfit to hold Kikuyu ... for medical epidemiological reasons".

While the Pipeline was primarily designed for adult males, a few thousand women and young girls were detained at an all-women camp at Kamiti, as well as a number of unaccompanied young children. Dozens of babies were born to women in captivity: "We really do need these cloths for the children as it is impossible to keep them clean and tidy while dressed in dirty pieces of sacking and blanket", wrote one colonial officer. Wamumu Camp was set up solely for all the unaccompanied boys in the Pipeline, though hundreds, maybe thousands, of boys moved around the adult parts of the Pipeline.

==== Works camps ====
Short rations, overwork, brutality, humiliating and disgusting treatment and flogging—all in violation of the United Nations Universal Declaration of Human Rights.

— One colonial officer's description of British works camps

There were originally two types of works camps envisioned by Baring: the first type were based in Kikuyu districts with the stated purpose of achieving the Swynnerton Plan; the second were punitive camps, designed for the 30,000 Mau Mau suspects who were deemed unfit to return to the reserves. These forced-labour camps provided a much needed source of labour to continue the colony's infrastructure development.

Colonial officers also saw the second sort of works camps as a way of ensuring that any confession was legitimate and as a final opportunity to extract intelligence. Probably the worst works camp to have been sent to was the one run out of Embakasi Prison, for Embakasi was responsible for the Embakasi Airport, the construction of which was demanded to be finished before the Emergency came to an end. The airport was a massive project with an unquenchable thirst for labour, and the time pressures ensured the detainees' forced labour was especially hard.

=== Villagisation programme ===
At the end of 1953, the Administration were faced with the serious problem of the concealment of terrorists and supply of food to them. This was widespread and, owing to the scattered nature of the homesteads, fear of detection was negligible; so, in the first instance, the inhabitants of those areas were made to build and live in concentrated villages. This first step had to be taken speedily, somewhat to the detriment of usual health measures and was definitely a punitive short-term measure.

— District Commissioner of Nyeri

If military operations in the forests and Operation Anvil were the first two phases of Mau Mau's defeat, Erskine expressed the need and his desire for a third and final phase: cut off all the militants' support in the reserves. The means to this terminal end was originally suggested by the man brought in by the colonial government to do an ethnopsychiatric 'diagnosis' of the uprising, JC Carothers: he advocated a Kenyan version of the villagisation programmes that the British were already using in places like Malaya.

So it was that in June 1954, the War Council took the decision to undertake a full-scale forced-resettlement programme of Kiambu, Nyeri, Murang'a and Embu Districts to cut off Mau Mau's supply lines. Within eighteen months, 1,050,899 Kikuyu in the reserves were inside 804 villages consisting of some 230,000 huts. The government termed them "protected villages", purportedly to be built along "the same lines as the villages in the North of England", though the term was actually a "euphemism for the fact that hundreds of thousands of civilians were corralled, often against their will, into settlements behind barbed-wire fences and watch towers."

While some of these villages were to protect loyalist Kikuyu, "most were little more than concentration camps to punish Mau Mau sympathizers." The colonial government circulated photographs of playgrounds and shops to obscure the punitive nature of these villages. Interviews with women who lived inside them reveal a "topography of terror" where experiences of violence were frequent. The villagisation programme was the coup de grâce for Mau Mau. By the end of the following summer, Lieutenant General Lathbury no longer needed Lincoln bombers for raids because of a lack of targets, and, by late 1955, Lathbury felt so sure of final victory that he reduced army forces to almost pre-Mau Mau levels.

He noted, however, that the British should have "no illusions about the future. Mau Mau has not been cured: it has been suppressed. The thousands who have spent a long time in detention must have been embittered by it. Nationalism is still a very potent force and the African will pursue his aim by other means. Kenya is in for a very tricky political future."

Whilst they [the Kikuyu] could not be expected to take kindly at first to a departure from their traditional way of life, such as living in villages, they need and desire to be told just what to do.

— Council of Kenya-Colony's Ministers, July 1954

The government's public relations officer, Granville Roberts, presented villagisation as a good opportunity for rehabilitation, particularly of women and children, but it was, in fact, first and foremost designed to break Mau Mau and protect loyalist Kikuyu, a fact reflected in the extremely limited resources made available to the Rehabilitation and Community Development Department. Refusal to move could be punished with the destruction of property and livestock, and the roofs were usually ripped off of homes whose occupants demonstrated reluctance. Villagisation also solved the practical and financial problems associated with a further, massive expansion of the Pipeline programme, and the removal of people from their land hugely assisted the enaction of Swynnerton Plan.

The villages were surrounded by deep, spike-bottomed trenches and barbed wire, and the villagers themselves were watched over by members of the Kikuyu Home Guard, often neighbours and relatives. In short, rewards or collective punishments such as curfews could be served much more readily after villagisation, and this quickly broke Mau Mau's passive wing. Though there were degrees of difference between the villages, the overall conditions engendered by villagisation meant that, by early 1955, districts began reporting starvation and malnutrition. One provincial commissioner blamed child hunger on parents deliberately withholding food, saying the latter were aware of the "propaganda value of apparent malnutrition".

From the health point of view, I regard villagisation as being exceedingly dangerous and we are already starting to reap the benefits.

— Meru's District Commissioner, 6 November 1954,
four months after the institution of villagisation

The Red Cross helped mitigate the food shortages, but even they were told to prioritise loyalist areas. The Baring government's medical department issued reports about "the alarming number of deaths occurring amongst children in the 'punitive' villages", and the "political" prioritisation of Red Cross relief.

One of the colony's ministers blamed the "bad spots" in Central Province on the mothers of the children for "not realis[ing] the great importance of proteins", and one former missionary reported that it "was terribly pitiful how many of the children and the older Kikuyu were dying. They were so emaciated and so very susceptible to any kind of disease that came along". Of the 50,000 deaths which John Blacker attributed to the Emergency, half were children under the age of ten.

The lack of food did not just affect the children, of course. The Overseas Branch of the British Red Cross commented on the "women who, from progressive undernourishment, had been unable to carry on with their work".

Disease prevention was not helped by the colony's policy of returning sick detainees to receive treatment in the reserves, though the reserves' medical services were virtually non-existent, as Baring himself noted after a tour of some villages in June 1956. The policy of "villagization" did not officially end until around 1962, when Kenya gained its independence from British colonial rule. During the course of the Mau Mau Uprising, it is conservatively estimated that 1.5 million Kenyans were forcibly relocated into these fortified villages. The government of an independent Kenya implementated a similar policy of forced villagization during the Shifta War in 1966 of ethnic Somalis in the North Eastern Province.

=== Political and social concessions by the British ===
Kenyans were granted nearly all of the demands made by the KAU in 1951.

On 18 January 1955, the Governor-General of Kenya, Evelyn Baring, offered an amnesty to Mau Mau activists. The offer was that they would not face prosecution for previous offences, but might still be detained. European settlers were appalled at the leniency of the offer. On 10 June 1955 with no response forthcoming, the offer of amnesty to the Mau Mau was revoked.

In June 1956, a programme of land reform increased the land holdings of the Kikuyu. This was coupled with a relaxation of the ban on native Kenyans growing coffee, a primary cash crop.

In the cities the colonial authorities decided to dispel tensions by raising urban wages, thereby strengthening the hand of moderate union organisations like the KFRTU. By 1956, the British had granted direct election of native Kenyan members of the Legislative Assembly, followed shortly thereafter by an increase in the number of local seats to fourteen. A Parliamentary conference in January 1960 indicated that the British would accept "one person—one vote" majority rule.

== Deaths ==
The number of deaths attributable to the Emergency is disputed. David Anderson estimates 25,000 people died; British demographer John Blacker's estimate is 50,000 deaths—half of them children aged ten or below. He attributes this death toll mostly to increased malnutrition, starvation and disease from wartime conditions.

Caroline Elkins says "tens of thousands, perhaps hundreds of thousands" died. Elkins' numbers have been challenged by Blacker, who demonstrated in detail that her numbers were overestimated, explaining that Elkins' figure of 300,000 deaths "implies that perhaps half of the adult male population would have been wiped out—yet the censuses of 1962 and 1969 show no evidence of this—the age-sex pyramids for the Kikuyu districts do not even show indentations."

His study dealt directly with Elkins' claim that "somewhere between 130,000 and 300,000 Kikuyu are unaccounted for" at the 1962 census, and was read by both David Anderson and John Lonsdale prior to publication. David Elstein has noted that leading authorities on Africa have taken issue with parts of Elkins' study, in particular her mortality figures: "The senior British historian of Kenya, John Lonsdale, whom Elkins thanks profusely in her book as 'the most gifted scholar I know', warned her to place no reliance on anecdotal sources, and regards her statistical analysis—for which she cites him as one of three advisors—as 'frankly incredible'."

The British possibly killed more than 20,000 Mau Mau militants, but in some ways more notable is the smaller number of Mau Mau suspects dealt with by capital punishment: by the end of the Emergency, the total was 1,090. At no other time or place in the British Empire was capital punishment dispensed so aggressively—the total is more than double the number executed by the French in Algeria.

Wangari Maathai suggests that more than one hundred thousand Africans, mostly Kikuyus, may have died in the concentration camps and emergency villages.

Officially 1,819 Native Kenyans were killed by the Mau Mau. David Anderson believes this to be an undercount and cites a higher figure of 5,000 killed by the Mau Mau. In addition, 95 British military personnel died as a result of the conflict.

== War crimes ==
War crimes have been broadly defined by the Nuremberg principles as "violations of the laws or customs of war", which includes massacres, bombings of civilian targets, terrorism, mutilation, torture, and murder of detainees and prisoners of war. Additional common crimes include theft, arson, and the destruction of property not warranted by military necessity.

David Anderson says the rebellion was "a story of atrocity and excess on both sides, a dirty war from which no one emerged with much pride, and certainly no glory". Political scientist Daniel Goldhagen describes the campaign against the Mau Mau as an example of eliminationism, though this verdict has been fiercely criticised.

=== British war crimes ===
We knew the slow method of torture [at the Mau Mau Investigation Center] was worse than anything we could do. Special Branch there had a way of slowly electrocuting a Kuke—they'd rough up one for days. Once I went personally to drop off one gang member who needed special treatment. I stayed for a few hours to help the boys out, softening him up. Things got a little out of hand. By the time I cut his balls off, he had no ears, and his eyeball, the right one, I think, was hanging out of its socket. Too bad, he died before we got much out of him.

— One settler's description of British interrogation. The extent to which such accounts can be taken at face value has been questioned.

The British authorities suspended civil liberties in Kenya. Many Kikuyu were forced to move. According to British authorities 80,000 were interned. Caroline Elkins estimated that between 160,000 and 320,000 were interned in detention camps also known as concentration camps. (Note: Other estimates are as high as 450,000 interned.) Most of the rest—more than a million Kikuyu—were held in "enclosed villages" as part of the villagisation program. Although some were Mau Mau guerrillas, most were victims of collective punishment that colonial authorities imposed on large areas of the country. Thousands were beaten or sexually assaulted to extract information about the Mau Mau threat. Later, prisoners suffered even worse mistreatment in an attempt to force them to renounce their allegiance to the insurgency and to obey commands. Prisoners were questioned with the help of "slicing off ears, boring holes in eardrums, flogging until death, pouring paraffin over suspects who were then set alight, and burning eardrums with lit cigarettes." The use of castration and denying access to medical aid to the detainees by the British were also widespread and common. As described by Ian Cobain of The Guardian in 2013:

Among the detainees who suffered severe mistreatment was Hussein Onyango Obama, the grandfather of [U.S. President] Barack Obama. According to his widow, British soldiers forced pins into his fingernails and buttocks and squeezed his testicles between metal rods. Two of the original five claimants who brought the test case against the British were castrated.

The historian Robert Edgerton describes the methods used during the emergency: "If a question was not answered to the interrogator's satisfaction, the subject was beaten and kicked. If that did not lead to the desired confession, and it rarely did, more force was applied. Electric shock was widely used, and so was fire. Women were choked and held under water; gun barrels, beer bottles, and even knives were thrust into their vaginas. Men had beer bottles thrust up their rectums, were dragged behind Land Rovers, whipped, burned and bayoneted... Some police officers did not bother with more time-consuming forms of torture; they simply shot any suspect who refused to answer, then told the next suspect, to dig his own grave. When the grave was finished, the man was asked if he would now be willing to talk."

[E]lectric shock was widely used, as well as cigarettes and fire. Bottles (often broken), gun barrels, knives, snakes, vermin, and hot eggs were thrust up men's rectums and women's vaginas. The screening teams whipped, shot, burned and mutilated Mau Mau suspects, ostensibly to gather intelligence for military operations and as court evidence.

— Caroline Elkins

In June 1957, Eric Griffith-Jones, the attorney general of the British administration in Kenya, wrote to the Governor, Sir Evelyn Baring, detailing the way the regime of abuse at the colony's detention camps was being subtly altered. He said that the mistreatment of the detainees is "distressingly reminiscent of conditions in Nazi Germany or Communist Russia". Despite this, he said that in order for abuse to remain legal, Mau Mau suspects must be beaten mainly on their upper body, "vulnerable parts of the body should not be struck, particularly the spleen, liver or kidneys", and it was important that "those who administer violence ... should remain collected, balanced and dispassionate"; he also reminded the governor that "If we are going to sin", he wrote, "we must sin quietly."

According to author Wangari Maathai, three out of every four Kikuyu men were in detention in 1954. Maathai states that detainees were made to do forced labor and that their land was taken from them and given to collaborators. Maathai further states that the Home Guard in particular, raped women and had a reputation for cruelty in the form of terror and intimidation, whereas the Mau Mau soldiers were initially respectful of women. Only a small handful of rape cases went to trial. Fifty-six British soldiers and colonial police officers were tried for rape, of which 17 were convicted. The harshest sentences imposed were six-year sentences imposed on three British soldiers convicted of gang-raping a woman.

==== Chuka massacre ====
The Chuka massacre, which happened in Chuka, Kenya, was perpetrated by members of the King's African Rifles B Company in June 1953 with 20 unarmed people killed during the Mau Mau uprising. Members of the 5th KAR B Company entered the Chuka area on 13 June 1953, to flush out rebels suspected of hiding in the nearby forests. Over the next few days, the regiment had captured and executed 20 people suspected of being Mau Mau fighters for unknown reasons. The people executed belonged to the Kikuyu Home Guard—a loyalist militia recruited by the British to fight the guerrillas. All of the soldiers involved in the Chuka patrols were placed under open arrest at Nairobi's Buller Camp, but were not prosecuted. Instead, only their commanding officer, Major Gerald Selby Lee Griffiths, stood trial. Furthermore, rather than risk bringing publicity to the incident, Griffiths was charged with the murder of two other suspects in a separate incident that had taken place several weeks earlier. He was acquitted, but following public outcry, Griffiths was then tried under six separate charges of torture and disgraceful conduct for torturing two unarmed detainees, including a man named Njeru Ndwega. At his court-martial, it was stated that Griffiths had made Ndwega take off his pants, before telling a teenage African private to castrate him. When the private, a 16-year-old Somali named Ali Segat, refused to do this, Griffiths instead ordered him to cut off Ndwega's ear, to which Segat complied. On 11 March 1954, Griffiths was found guilty on five counts. He was sentenced to five years in prison and was cashiered from the Army. He served his sentence at Wormwood Scrubs Prison in London. None of the other ranks involved in the massacre were prosecuted.

==== Hola massacre ====
The Hola massacre was an incident during the conflict in Kenya against British colonial rule at a colonial detention camp in Hola, Kenya. By January 1959, the camp had a population of 506 detainees, of whom 127 were held in a secluded "closed camp". This more remote camp near Garissa, eastern Kenya, was reserved for the most uncooperative of the detainees. They often refused, even when threats of force were made, to join in the colonial "rehabilitation process" or perform manual labour or obey colonial orders. The camp commandant outlined a plan that would force 88 of the detainees to bend to work. On 3 March 1959, the camp commandant put this plan into action—as a result, 11 detainees were clubbed to death by guards. 77 surviving detainees sustained serious permanent injuries. The British government accepts that the colonial administration tortured detainees, but denies liability.

=== Mau Mau war crimes ===
Mau Mau fighters, ... contrary to African customs and values, assaulted old people, women and children. The horrors they practiced included the following: decapitation and general mutilation of civilians, torture before murder, bodies bound up in sacks and dropped in wells, burning the victims alive, gouging out of eyes, splitting open the stomachs of pregnant women. No war can justify such gruesome actions. In man's inhumanity to man, there is no race distinction. The Africans were practicing it on themselves. There was no reason and no restraint on both sides.

— Bethwell Ogot

==== Lari massacres ====
Mau Mau militants perpetrated numerous war crimes. One such incident was their attack on the settlement of Lari, on the night of 25–26 March 1953, in which they herded men, women and children into huts and set fire to them, hacking down with machetes anyone who attempted escape, before throwing them back into the burning huts. The attack at Lari was so extreme that "African policemen who saw the bodies of the victims ... were physically sick and said 'These people are animals. If I see one now I shall shoot with the greatest eagerness'", and it "even shocked many Mau Mau supporters, some of whom would subsequently try to excuse the attack as 'a mistake'". A total of 309 rebels would be prosecuted for the massacre, of which 136 were convicted. Seventy-one of those convicted were executed.

A retaliatory massacre was immediately perpetrated by Kenyan security forces who were partially overseen by British commanders. Official estimates place the death toll from the first Lari massacre at 74, and the retaliatory attack at 150, though neither of these figures account for people who may have been 'disappeared'. Whatever the actual number of victims, "[t]he grim truth was that, for every person who died in Lari's first massacre, at least two more were killed in retaliation in the second."

Aside from the Lari massacres, Kikuyu were also tortured, mutilated and murdered by Mau Mau on many other occasions. Mau Mau were estimated to have killed 1,819 of their fellow native Kenyans, though again, this number may exclude those whose bodies were never found. Anderson estimates the true number to be around 5,000. Thirty-two European and twenty-six Asian civilians were also murdered by Mau Mau militants, with similar numbers wounded. The best known European victim was Michael Ruck, aged six, who was hacked to death with pangas along with his parents, Roger and Esme, and one of the Rucks' farm workers, Muthura Nagahu, who had tried to help the family. Newspapers in Kenya and abroad published graphic murder details, including images of young Michael with bloodied teddy bears and trains strewn on his bedroom floor.

In 1952, the poisonous latex of the African milk bush was used by members of Mau Mau to kill cattle in an incident of biological warfare.

== Legacy ==
Although Mau Mau was effectively crushed by the end of 1956, it was not until the First Lancaster House Conference, in January 1960, that native Kenyan majority rule was established and the period of colonial transition to independence initiated. Before the conference, it was anticipated by both native Kenyan and European leaders that Kenya was set for a European-dominated multi-racial government.

There is continuing debate about Mau Mau's and the rebellion's effects on decolonisation and on Kenya after independence. Regarding decolonisation, the most common view is that Kenya's independence came about as a result of the British government's deciding that a continuance of colonial rule would entail a greater use of force than the British public would tolerate. Nissimi argues, though, that such a view fails to "acknowledge the time that elapsed until the rebellion's influence actually took effect [and does not] explain why the same liberal tendencies failed to stop the dirty war the British conducted against the Mau Mau in Kenya while it was raging on". Others contend that, as the 1950s progressed, nationalist intransigence increasingly rendered official plans for political development irrelevant, meaning that after the mid-1950s British policy increasingly accepted Kenyan nationalism and moved to co-opt its leaders and organisations into collaboration.

It has been argued that the conflict helped set the stage for Kenyan independence in December 1963, or at least secured the prospect of Black-majority rule once the British left. However, this is disputed and other sources downplay the contribution of Mau Mau to decolonisation. Daniel Branch for example, declared that the conflict was intrinsically rooted in longstanding grievances against the colonial government; while he simultaneously highlighted that the rebellion quickly transformed from anti-colonial protest to civil war among the populous of the Mount Kenya region. Branch argued it is impossible to accurately depict the events in Kenya during the 1950s without the inclusion of loyalists, as the story of the rebellion is not of two distinct pre-existing camps going into battle but rather, that the critical question was the origins of the societal divide of the Kikuyu during the war.

On 12 December 1964, President Kenyatta issued an amnesty to Mau Mau fighters to surrender to the government. Some Mau Mau members insisted that they should get land and be absorbed into the civil service and Kenya army. On 28 January 1965, the Kenyatta government sent the Kenya army to the Meru district, where Mau Mau fighters gathered under the leadership of Field Marshal Mwariama and Field Marshal Baimungi. These leaders and several Mau Mau fighters were killed. On 14 January 1965, the Minister for Defence Dr Njoroge Mungai was quoted in the Daily Nation saying: "They are now outlaws, who will be pursued and brought to punishment. They must be outlawed as well in the minds of all the people of Kenya."

On 12 September 2015, the British government unveiled a Mau Mau memorial statue in Nairobi's Uhuru Park that it had funded "as a symbol of reconciliation between the British government, the Mau Mau, and all those who suffered". This followed a June 2013 decision by Britain to compensate more than 5,000 Kenyans it had tortured and abused during the Mau Mau insurgency.

=== Compensation claims ===
In 1999, a collection of former fighters calling themselves the Mau Mau Original Group announced that they would attempt a £5 billion claim against the UK on behalf of hundreds of thousands of Kenyans for ill-treatment that they said they had suffered during the rebellion, though nothing came of it. In November 2002, the Mau Mau Trust—a welfare group for former members of the movement—announced that it would attempt to sue the British government for widespread human rights violations it said had been committed against its members. Until September 2003, the Mau Mau movement was banned.

Once the ban was removed, former Mau Mau members who had been castrated or otherwise tortured were supported by the Kenya Human Rights Commission, in particular by the commission's George Morara, in their attempt to take on the British government; their lawyers had amassed 6,000 depositions regarding human rights abuses by late 2002. 42 potential claimants were interviewed, from whom five were chosen to prosecute a test case; one of the five, Susan Ciong'ombe Ngondi, has since died. The remaining four test claimants are: Ndiku Mutua, who was castrated; Paulo Muoka Nzili, who was castrated; Jane Muthoni Mara, who was subjected to sexual assault that included having bottles filled with boiling water pushed up her vagina; and Wambugu Wa Nyingi, who survived the Hola massacre.

Ben Macintyre of The Times said of the legal case: "Opponents of these proceedings have pointed out, rightly, that the Mau Mau was a brutal terrorist force, guilty of the most dreadful atrocities. Yet only one of the claimants is of that stamp—Mr Nzili. He has admitted taking the Mau Mau oath and said that all he did was to ferry food to the fighters in the forest. None has been accused, let alone convicted, of any crime."

Upon publication of Caroline Elkins' Imperial Reckoning in 2005, Kenya called for an apology from the UK for atrocities committed during the 1950s. The British government claimed that the issue was the responsibility of the Kenyan government, on the ground of "state succession" for former colonies, relying on an obscure legal precedent relating to Patagonian toothfish and the declaration of martial law in Jamaica in 1860.

In July 2011, "George Morara strode down the corridor and into a crowded little room [in Nairobi] where 30 elderly Kenyans sat hunched together around a table clutching cups of hot tea and sharing plates of biscuits. 'I have good news from London', he announced. 'We have won the first part of the battle!' At once, the room erupted in cheers." The good news was that a British judge had ruled that the Kenyans could sue the British government for their torture. Morara said that, if the first test cases succeeded, perhaps 30,000 others would file similar complaints of torture. Explaining his decision, Mr Justice McCombe said the claimants had an "arguable case", and added:

It may well be thought strange, or perhaps even dishonourable, that a legal system which will not in any circumstances admit into its proceedings evidence obtained by torture should yet refuse to entertain a claim against the Government in its own jurisdiction for that Government's allegedly negligent failure to prevent torture which it had the means to prevent. Furthermore, resort to technicality ... to rule such a claim out of court appears particularly misplaced.

A Times editorial noted with satisfaction that "Mr Justice McCombe told the FCO, in effect, to get lost. ... Though the arguments against reopening very old wounds are seductive, they fail morally. There are living claimants and it most certainly was not their fault that the documentary evidence that seems to support their claims was for so long 'lost' in the governmental filing system."

If we are going to sin, we must sin quietly.

— Kenyan Attorney-General Eric Griffith-Jones

During the course of the Mau Mau legal battle in London, a large amount of what was stated to be formerly lost Foreign Office archival material was finally brought to light, while yet more was discovered to be missing. The files, known as migrated archives, provided details of British human rights abuses (torture, rape, execution) in Kenya during the Mau Mau rebellion, as well as records from other colonies. Regarding the Mau Mau Uprising, the records included confirmation of "the extent of the violence inflicted on suspected Mau Mau rebels" in British detention camps documented in Caroline Elkins' study. Numerous allegations of murder and rape by British military personnel are recorded in the files, including an incident where a native Kenyan baby was "burnt to death", the "defilement of a young girl", and a soldier in Royal Irish Fusiliers who killed "in cold blood two people who had been his captives for over 12 hours". Baring himself was aware of the "extreme brutality" of the sometimes lethal torture meted out—which included "most drastic" beatings, solitary confinement, starvation, castration, whipping, burning, rape, sodomy, and forceful insertion of objects into orifices—but took no action. Baring's inaction was despite the urging of people like Arthur Young, Commissioner of Police for Kenya for less than eight months of 1954 before he resigned in protest, that "the horror of some of the [camps] should be investigated without delay". In February 1956, a provincial commissioner in Kenya, "Monkey" Johnson, wrote to Attorney General Reginald Manningham-Buller urging him to block any enquiry into the methods used against Mau Mau: "It would now appear that each and every one of us, from the Governor downwards, may be in danger of removal from public service by a commission of enquiry as a result of enquiries made by the CID." The April 2012 release also included detailed accounts of the policy of seizing livestock from Kenyans suspected of supporting Mau Mau rebels.

Main criticism we shall have to meet is that 'Cowan plan' which was approved by Government contained instructions which in effect authorised unlawful use of violence against detainees.

— Colonial Secretary Alan Lennox-Boyd

Commenting on the papers, David Anderson stated that the "documents were hidden away to protect the guilty", and "that the extent of abuse now being revealed is truly disturbing". "Everything that could happen did happen. Allegations about beatings and violence were widespread. Basically you could get away with murder. It was systematic", Anderson said. An example of this impunity is the case of eight colonial officials accused of having prisoners tortured to death going unpunished even after their actions were reported to London. Huw Bennett of King's College London, who had worked with Anderson on the Chuka Massacre, said in a witness statement to the court that the new documents "considerably strengthen" the knowledge that the British Army were "intimately involved" with the colonial security forces, whom they knew were "systematically abusing and torturing detainees in screening centres and detention camps". In April 2011, lawyers for the Foreign and Commonwealth Office continued to maintain that there was no such policy. As early as November 1952, however, military reports noted that "[t]he Army has been used for carrying out certain functions that properly belonged to the Police, eg. searching of huts and screening of Africans", and British soldiers arrested and transferred Mau Mau suspects to camps where they were beaten and tortured until they confessed. Bennett said that "the British Army retained ultimate operational control over all security forces throughout the Emergency", and that its military intelligence operation worked "hand in glove" with the Kenyan Special Branch "including in screening and interrogations in centres and detention camps".

The Kenyan government sent a letter to the Secretary of State for Foreign and Commonwealth Affairs, William Hague, insisting that the UK government was legally liable for the atrocities. The Foreign Office, however, reaffirmed its position that it was not, in fact, liable for colonial atrocities, and argued that the documents had not "disappeared" as part of a cover-up. Nearly ten years before, in late 2002, as the BBC aired a documentary detailing British human rights abuses committed during the rebellion and 6,000 depositions had been taken for the legal case, former district colonial officer John Nottingham had expressed concern that compensation be paid soon, since most victims were in their 80s and would soon die. He told the BBC: "What went on in the Kenya camps and villages was brutal, savage torture. It is time that the mockery of justice that was perpetrated in this country at that time, should be, must be righted. I feel ashamed to have come from a Britain that did what it did here [in Kenya]."

Thirteen boxes of "top secret" Kenya files are still missing.

In October 2012, Mr Justice McCombe granted the surviving elderly test claimants the right to sue the UK for damages. The UK government then opted for what the claimants' lawyers called the "morally repugnant" decision to appeal McCombe's ruling. In May 2013, it was reported that the appeal was on hold while the UK government held compensation negotiations with the claimants.

=== Settlement ===
On 6 June 2013, then foreign secretary, William Hague, told parliament that the UK government had reached a settlement with the claimants. He said it included "payment of a settlement sum in respect of 5,228 claimants, as well as a gross costs sum, to the total value of £19.9 million. The Government will also support the construction of a memorial in Nairobi to the victims of torture and ill-treatment during the colonial era." However he added, "We continue to deny liability on behalf of the Government and British taxpayers today for the actions of the colonial administration in respect of the claims".

== Mau Mau status in Kenya ==
Partisan questions about the Mau Mau war have ... echoed round Kenya's political arena during 40 years of independence. How historically necessary was Mau Mau? Did its secretive violence alone have the power to destroy white supremacy? Or did it merely sow discord within a mass nationalism that—for all the failings of the Kenya African Union (KAU)—was bound to win power in the end? Did Mau Mau aim at freedom for all Kenyans? or did moderate, constitutional politicians rescue that pluralist prize from the jaws of its ethnic chauvinism? Has the self-sacrificial victory of the poor been unjustly forgotten, and appropriated by the rich? or are Mau Mau's defeats and divisions best buried in oblivion?

— John Lonsdale

It is often argued that the Mau Mau Uprising was suppressed as a subject for public discussion in Kenya during the periods under Kenyatta and Daniel arap Moi because of the key positions and influential presence of some loyalists in government, business and other elite sectors of Kenyan society post-1963. Unsurprisingly, during this same period opposition groups tactically embraced the Mau Mau rebellion.

Members of Mau Mau are currently recognised by the Kenyan Government as freedom-independence heroes and heroines who sacrificed their lives in order to free Kenyans from colonial rule. Since 2010, Mashujaa Day (Heroes' Day) has been marked annually on 20 October (the same day Baring signed the Emergency order). According to the Kenyan Government, Mashujaa Day will be a time for Kenyans to remember and honour the Mau Mau and other Kenyans who participated in the independence struggle. Mashujaa Day replaced Kenyatta Day; the latter was until 2010 also held on 20 October. In 2001, the Kenyan Government announced that important Mau Mau sites were to be turned into national monuments.

This official celebration of the Mau Mau is in marked contrast to post-colonial Kenyan governments' rejection of the Mau Mau as an engine of national liberation. Such a turnabout has attracted criticism of government manipulation of the Mau Mau uprising for political ends.

We are determined to have independence in peace, and we shall not allow hooligans to rule Kenya. We must have no hatred towards one another. Mau Mau was a disease which had been eradicated, and must never be remembered again.

— Speech by Jomo Kenyatta, 8 September 1962

== See also ==
- The Black Man's Land Trilogy, series of films on Kenya
- Frank Kitson, author of Gangs and Counter-gangs
- Kurito ole Kisio
- Muthoni wa Kirima
- Robert Ruark, author of Something of Value and Uhuru
- Weep Not, Child

=== Insurgency ===
- Mungiki, contemporary Kikuyu insurgency within Kenya

=== General ===
- British military history
- History of Kenya
