= Kenya Land and Freedom Army =

Militant rebel group in colonial Kenya (1940s–60s)

- Leader: Dedan Kimathi
- Dates active: 1952–1960
- Newspaper: High Command
- Ideology: Anti-colonialism; Anti-imperialism; Kenyan nationalism; Kikuyu interests
- Size: 35,000+

The Kenya Land and Freedom Army (KLFA), also known as the Mau Mau, was a Kenyan insurgent group which fought against British colonial rule in Kenya during the Mau Mau rebellion from 1952 to 1960. Its membership consisted largely of the Kikuyu people. The KLFA was led by Dedan Kimathi for most of its existence. After four years, British forces managed to destroy the KFLA militarily, and Kimathi was captured and executed in 1957. Though the Mau Mau rebellion was ultimately suppressed, it played a major role in achieving Kenya's independence, which occurred in 1963.

== History ==
=== Origins ===
The KLFA's membership consisted largely of the Kikuyu people, many of whom had their lands confiscated by British colonial officials and given to white settlers during the early 20th century. The KLFA espoused African nationalist and anti-colonial ideologies, and was led by Dedan Kimathi for most of its existence.

=== Mau Mau uprising ===
The KFLA began what is now called the Mau Mau uprising in 1952. After four years of counterinsurgency operations, British forces managed to largely neutralise the KFLA as a military threat, and Kimathi was captured and executed by the colonial authorities in 1957. The Mau Mau rebellion was fully defeated by 1960.

During the rebellion, thousands of KFLA insurgents were killed by the British, including 1,090 people who were executed by the colonial authorities. Official numbers state that 11,000 insurgents were killed, though the Kenya Human Rights Commission has estimated that "90,000 Kenyans were executed, tortured or maimed during the crackdown, and 160,000 were detained in appalling conditions". Oxford University professor David Anderson estimated that up to 25,000 people were killed during the conflict. The colonial administration also interned at least 80,000 Kenyans suspected of being affiliated with the KFLA in detention camps, with some estimates of the number of detainees being as high as 320,000 people. Torture was widespread against detainees, and in 1959 11 prisoners were killed by camp guards in the Hola massacre. The KFLA also committed numerous atrocities, including the Lari massacre, and murdered at least 1,819 Kenyan civilians.

=== Structure ===
A KFLA platoon consisted between 500 and 2,000 insurgents. If the platoon numbered in the thousands, its general was assisted by a colonel and a brigadier. KFLA generals included Chui, Kassam Njogu, China, Stanley Mathenge, Kubu Kubu and Bamuingi. The capture of Kimathi on 21 October 1956, fatally crippled the KFLA, and ultimately played a major role in ending the rebellion.

=== Information systems ===
One of the most important achievements of the KFLA was the development of a robust and effective information system that combined oral experiences of ordinary Kenyans with print works. Songs were produced to pass on important information and to raise political consciousness and at the same time newspapers would be published. The KFLA published over 50 newspapers in different languages such as Swahili, Kikuyu and other Kenyan languages. KFLA members also produced a large amount of sound recordings and had their own presses.

== Aftermath and impact ==
Though the Mau Mau rebellion was ultimately suppressed, it played a major role in achieving Kenyan independence, which occurred on 12 December 1963. After independence, former KFLA general Bamuingi continued to lead a team of former KFLA insurgents which were killed by Kenyan security forces operating under the command of Jomo Kenyatta. They had returned to the forests in 1965 to fight against the new Kenyan government, claiming that independence only benefited pro-British collaborators and political moderates. Their bodies were paraded in Meru Township for three days as the "last chiefs of the Mau-Mau freedom terrorists".
