= Nyaga (name) =

Nyaga or Nyagah is a given name or surname of Kenyan origin shared by several notable people, including:

== Surname ==
- Caroline Nyaga (born 1993), Kenyan long-distance runner
- David Nyaga, Kenyan-born Qatari middle-distance runner
- Jeremiah J. M. Nyagah, Kenyan politician
- Joseph Nyagah (1948–2020), Kenyan politician
- Norman Nyagah, Kenyan politician
- Stanley Nyagah (1936–2005), Kenyan member of parliament

== Middle name ==
- Martin Nyaga Wambora, Kenyan politician
