= Kangaru High School =

Public high school in Embu, Kenya

Kangaru School

Location
- P.O Box 17 - 60100, Embu; Manyatta Constituency, Embu County, (Kirimari Ward), Kenya; 0°30′34″S 37°27′40″E

Information
- Other names: K.S.
- Former name: Government African School Kangaru; Kangaru Boys High School
- School type: Public Regional School
- Motto: Serve and lead
- Founded: 1 January 1947; 79 years ago
- Founder: Sir Robin Wainright
- Sister school: Kangaru Girls High School
- Chairman: Patrick Kinyua Njagi
- Principal: John Bosco Akaale
- Gender: Male
- Language: English, Kiswahili
- Campus: Urban
- Colors: Green; White; Grey
- Mascot: Lion
- Nickname: Kangach
- Rival: Moi High School Mbiruri
- Alumni name: Kangaru Old Boys Association
- Website: http://www.kangaruschool.ac.ke/

Kangaru School, formerly known as Government African School Kangaru and Kangaru High School, is an all boys high school situated along the Embu-Meru highway in Embu, Kenya. It was built by the first missionaries that arrived in Kenya during the colonialism in the 1920s. It was rebuilt in 1947 by Sir Robin Wainright on a Harambee basis. It is one of the oldest schools in the country. There is a nearby village called Kangaru which is probably where the name comes from. There is a river close to the school, the Kapingazi River. The school is popularly referred to as Kangach.

The student population is about 1400 with a teaching staff of about 60. Being an extra-county school, the majority of the students are from Embu County and the neighbouring counties which together with Embu were part of the former Eastern province

The school offers an 8-4-4 curriculum whereby students sit for the Kenya Certificate of Secondary Education (KCSE) exam at the end of a four-year programme. Subjects offered at Kangaru School range from Mathematics, Kiswahili, Christian and Islamic Religious Education, Geography, Chemistry, Biology, Physics, History and Government, Home Science, Computer Studies, French, English to Business Studies.

Kangaru later became a co-educational school, after which in 1989 it was split into separate institutions for boys and girls. The students live in 9 houses referred to as houses, named Mwea, Embu, Gichugu, Ndia, Gachoka, Mbeere, Hollywood, Mt.Kenya and Runyenjes.

== Notable alumni ==
- Adan Mohammed
- Mutava Musyimi
- Ben Mutua Jonathan Muriithi, popularly known as BMJ Muriithi, who is a US-based journalist working with the Voice of America, a popular benga artiste.
