= Muragari School =

Location
- Embu; Kenya

Information
- Established: 1932
- Founder: National Independent Church of Africa

Muragari Primary School is the third-oldest school in Embu, Kenya. It was founded in 1932 by the National Independent Church of Africa near the current Mukuuri Township, at the base of a large, ancient Mûkûû Tree (Sycamore Fig Tree), Runyenjes Sub County.

It was razed by colonialists in 1952 during the Mau Mau Uprising in Embu.

Muragari was rebuilt in 1955 on 24 acres as a government school, at the site where General Kubu Kubu was cremated after being shot dead by colonial officers.

Muragari now comprises a primary day school, Muragari Secondary School and Kubu Kubu Memorial Boarding Primary School in memory of General Kubu Kubu.

== Notable alumni ==
- Stanley Nyaga Kithung'a, founder of KASNEB and former Runyenjes MP
- Joseph Njagi Mbarire, MP
- Cecily Mutitu Mbarire, Embu Governor
- Hon. Martin Wambora, Former MP and Embu Governor
- Richard Nyaga, former Kenya Airways CEO
- Prof. Njiru Nthakanio, geneticist
- Mohammed Gakinya, Long serving KNUT Secretary General
- Alexander Njeru Ngari, Embu County Chairman and long-serving councillor
- Sicily Njiru, nominated MCA, Embu County
- Muchangi Mwariama, MCA Kagaari North
- Amos Njiru, former NICA Embu Bishop
