= Kubu Kubu =

Mau Mau leader in Kenya (1920–1956)

General Kubu Kubu
- Born: Njagi Wa Ikutha; 1920; Embu District, Eastern Province, Kenya
- Died: September 1956 (aged 35–36)
- Cause of death: Lynching
- Resting place: Muragari
- Citizenship: Kenyan
- Occupation: Soldier
- Organization: Kenya Land and Freedom Army
- Known for: General during the Mau Mau Uprising
- Successor: General Kavote

Kubu Kubu (or Kubukubu), born as Njagi wa Ikutha, (1920-1956) was an Embu Mau Mau leader and general. His nom de guerre, Kubu Kubu, means "heavy thud" in Kîembu, referencing to the thud his feet made due to his heavy build.

He was the de facto Mau Mau military leader in the Embu county, and an important leader nationally, alongside Dedan Kimathi, Musa Mwariama, and Waruhiu Itote.

Kubu Kubu was revered among the Embu for defending their territory from British rule, leading the community for more than ten years, and repulsing colonial settlers from the southern Kenyan highlands.

== Early life ==
Njagi wa Ikutha was born sometime in the late 1920s in a heavily forested area in Mukuuri, close to the current site of the Kubu Kubu Memorial Boarding Primary School, Embu County. Like many families from the colonial-era Mukuuri Native Reserve, Njagi's family later settled in the Kianjokoma area after independence.

== Legacy ==
In 1987, former Embu North Constituency (later split into Runyenjes and Manyatta) legislator Stanley Nyagah built a modern boarding primary school in Kubu Kubu's memory, where his body was burned in 1955.

A street and a shopping center in Embu Town, as well as a road in Nyeri Town and a main street in Runyenjes Town have also been named after him.
