= Jeremiah J. M. Nyagah =

Kenyan politician

The Honorable Jeremiah Joseph Mwaniki Nyagah
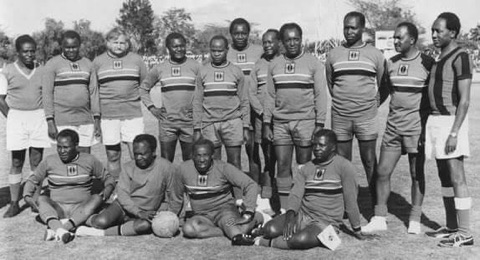
- Nyagah standing second from right

Sixth Minister of Agriculture
- In office 1971–1979
- Preceded by: Bruce Mackenzie
- Succeeded by: Gilbert Kabere M'mbijiwe

Member of Parliament for Gachoka Constituency
- In office 1963–1992
- Succeeded by: Norman Nyagah

Personal details
- Born: 24 November 1920 Embu District, Eastern Province, Kenya
- Died: 10 April 2008 (aged 87) Nairobi, Kenya
- Resting place: Kamutungi Village, Embu County
- Party: KANU
- Spouse: Eunice Wambere Nyagah
- Children: 4, including Joe and Norman
- Education: University of Oxford
- Occupation: Politician, Teacher
- Awards: Bronze Wolf (1982)

Jeremiah Joseph Mwaniki Nyagah (24 November 1920 – 10 April 2008) was a Kenyan politician who served in several capacities.

== Early life and education ==
He acquired his early primary and intermediate education in Embu and Kagumo High School (Nyeri) before proceeding to Alliance High School, Kikuyu in 1937 for four years leading to admission to Makerere College, Uganda in 1940 for a 3-year Diploma. After Makerere, Nyagah came back to Kenya to begin a teaching career in January 1944. Between 1944 and March 1958, Nyagah taught in schools and colleges and also administered the supervision of education in the Central Province in Kiambu District. During this period, he had a 2-year break when he joined the University of Oxford Department of Education for further training (1952–54) Nyagah was also an Honorary Doctor of Letters holder from Egerton University.

== Political life ==
He was elected a member of the pre-independence Legislative Council (Legco) to represent the present-day Embu, Mbeere, Kirinyaga and Nyeri districts in 1958. He went on to serve as a member of parliament for several decades in independent Kenya.

=== Legco ===
He was elected to the Legco in a by-election, caused by the creation of a new constituency, following negotiations with the British colonial government to increase the number of African representation. He had previously lost out to Bernard Mate in the 1957 general elections contesting the Central province seat. After Kenya's independence he became the member of parliament for Gachoka Constituency until his retirement in 1993.

=== Parliament ===
Jeremiah Nyagah served in Kenya's parliament from 1958 to 1992 when he retired. He was a Parliamentary Secretary in the Ministry of Power and Works in 1963. He also served as the longest serving cabinet minister from 1966 to 1992

He was elected to LegCo. (Parliament) in 1958 and served Kenya in that capacity up to January 1992 when he opted to retire from parliamentary politics. During his tenure in Parliament, he served for 8 years a backbencher (three of which was the 1st elected African Deputy Speaker). During his service of 35 years in Kenya's Parliament, he served in a number of national, regional and international bodies of socio-economic nature.

=== Cabinet positions ===
He served in several key full cabinet ministerial posts among them: Education, Information and Broadcasting, Agriculture, Environment and Health Between 1966 and 1992.

== Other interests ==
He also served the church and youth organisations very devotedly especially as the Kenya Scouts Association Chief Commissioner for 3 decades and later as their Chief Scout. Jeremiah Nyagah was awarded the Bronze Wolf, the only distinction of the World Organization of the Scout Movement, awarded by the World Scout Committee for exceptional services to world Scouting, in 1982. Other voluntary organisations he served in include Heart-to-Heart Foundation as a chairman of the board and the Kenya Fund for the Disabled. He also served international organisations like FAO, UNESCO, and UNEP.

== Death ==
Nyagah died on 10 April 2008 of pneumonia at Aga Khan Hospital, Nairobi.

== Personal life ==
His eldest son Hon Joseph Nyagah now deceased was a former cabinet Minister in the ministry of cooperatives as a nominated MP by the ODM party, as well as being a member of its senior-most decision making organ 'the ODM pentagon'. His eldest daughter Doctor Mary Khimulu is currently an ambassador to UNESCO.. His wife Eunice Wambere Nyagah died on 29 October 2006. His second son Hon. Norman Nyagah was a member of parliament for Kamukunji Constituency from 1992-2007 and was also a Govt Chief Whip. His other son Nahashon Nyagah, has served as a Governor of the Central Bank of Kenya.

== Legacy ==
=== Places named after Nyagah ===
- Jeremiah Nyagah National Polytechnic (Embu County)
