= University of Embu =

Public university in Kenya

- Chuo Kikuu cha Embu (Swahili)
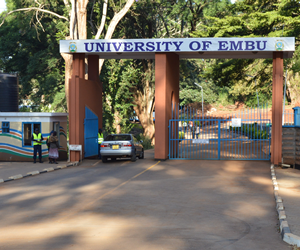
- Entrance of University of Embu
- Other name: UoEm
- Former names: Antecedent Institutions: Embu Agricultural Staff Training College (1947-1968); Embu Institute of Agriculture (1968-1990)
- Motto: Knowledge Transforms
- Type: Public University
- Established: 1947; 79 years ago
- Chairman: Prof. Philip Kutima
- Chancellor: Prof. Paul Musili Wambua
- Vice-Chancellor: Prof. Daniel Mugendi Njiru
- Location: Embu, Embu County, Kenya; 0°30′11.12″S 37°27′22.08″E
- Campus: Suburban/University Town
- Language: English, Swahili
- Colors: Green Gold Blue
- Mascot: Elephant
- Website: https://embuni.ac.ke/
- location of University of Embu

The University of Embu (UoEm) is a public research university located in Embu County, Kenya. Established in 2011 as a constituent college of the University of Nairobi and chartered as a full-fledged university in 2016. It offers undergraduate, postgraduate, and research programs across diverse disciplines. The institution serves as a key center for higher education and research in the region, with a focus on agriculture, science, business, education, and technology.

== Location ==
Embu, Kenya.

It is located along the Meru-Nairobi Highway, opposite Kangaru High School, 4 km from Embu town at Kirimari ward in Manyatta constituency, Embu West.

== History ==
The college was created from Embu Agricultural Staff Training (East) College in 2011, at which time President Mwai Kibaki inaugurated the EUC council to support its mission, pursuant to Legal Notice No. 65 of 17 June 2011.

The Embu Agricultural Staff Training (East) College was established in 1947 as an agriculture training school for pre-service training at certificate level to Kenya African Preliminary Examination (KAPE) students.

In 1968 the centre was renamed Embu Institute of Agriculture and started admitting secondary school students for two-year certificate training as Technical Assistants.

In 1990 it was up-graded to an Agricultural Staff Training College whose mandate was to develop and implement short management and technical courses, and offer research and consultancy services to enhance performance in the agricultural sector.

on October 7, 2016, University of Embu was awarded a Charter by H.E. President Uhuru Kenyatta at a function held at the State house, Nairobi. In another development, Prof. Musili Wambua was appointed by H.E. President Uhuru Kenyatta as the first Chancellor of the New University of Embu. University of Embu offers courses such as biochemistry, microbiology and biotechnology, law, industrial chemistry, analytical chemistry, animal science and veterinary studies, library and information science, computer engineering and education courses

The University of Embu overtook the University of Nairobi (UoN) and other state corporations with its stellar performance in the financial year 2019/20. A report by the Daily Nation on Tuesday, July 13, indicated that the university had ranked top in a study done by the Ministry of Public Service and Gender. The study was aimed at evaluating the performance of ministries, state corporations and tertiary institutions for 2019/20 and has been in the excellent category for 7 consecutive years. According to the Ministry of Public Service, the university received a 2.1250 excellent composite score followed by Tharaka Nithi University College with 2.1791.
