= 2013 Embu local elections =

Local elections in Kenya

Local elections were held in Embu to elect a Governor and County Assembly on 4 March 2013. Under the new constitution, which was passed in a 2010 referendum, the 2013 general elections were the first in which Governors and members of the County Assemblies for the newly created counties were elected. They will also be the first general elections run by the Independent Electoral and Boundaries Commission(IEBC) which has released the official list of candidates.

== Gubernatorial election ==
| Candidate | Running Mate | Coalition | Party | Votes |
|---|---|---|---|---|
| Karucu, Sylvester M Gakumu | Kamau, Joseph Kibuti | | NARC–Kenya | -- |
| Kiragu, Kithinji | Migua, Lazarus Njagi | | Alliance Party of Kenya | -- |
| Kumantha, Dr. Peter Njagi Njuki | Mitti, Erastus Njiru | | United Democratic Forum Party | -- |
| Nduma, Adrian Kinyua | Mugeni, Anne Juliet Wanjuki | | FORD–Asili | -- |
| Wambora, Martin Nyaga | Muchungu, Dorothy Nditi | Jubilee | The National Alliance | -- |

== Prospective candidates ==
The following are some of the candidates who have made public their intentions to run:

- Martin Nyaga Wambora - former Runyenjes MP and former Kenya Airports Authority chairman
- Sylvester Gakumu - former Kenya ambassador to the Democratic Republic of Congo
- Dr Njagi Kumantha - Psychiatrist
- Kithinji Kiragu - Management and strategic consultant
