= Kirimiri =

Forest in Kenya

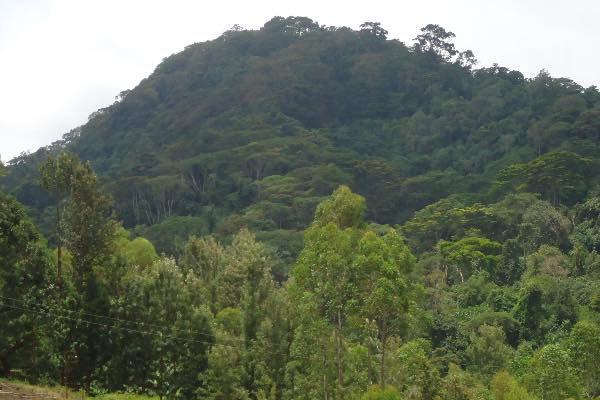
Kirimiri Forest in Mukuuri, Embu County, Kenya.

Kîrîmîri Forest Is an area dominated by tree vegetation in the Mukuuri locality of Runyenjes, Embu, in the country of Kenya. It is recognised as an Ecologically Sensitive Site in Africa by the International Union for Conservation of Nature. There are a variety of rare indigenous and medicinal trees that continue to face the threat of deforestation. The Kîrîmîri Forest center lies at a latitude of -0.41667 and longitude of 37.55 and it has an elevation of 1520 meters (4987 feet) above sea level. The predominant languages spoken are Kiembu, Swahili, and English. The Hill is culturally famous as a hideout for Mau Mau fighters including Embu's most venerated fighter General Kubu Kubu. Several schools have been built near the reserve. They include the Muragari Primary and Secondary Schools and Kubu Kubu Memorial School.
