= Gogo Salt Lick, Kenya =

Natural salt lick in Embu county

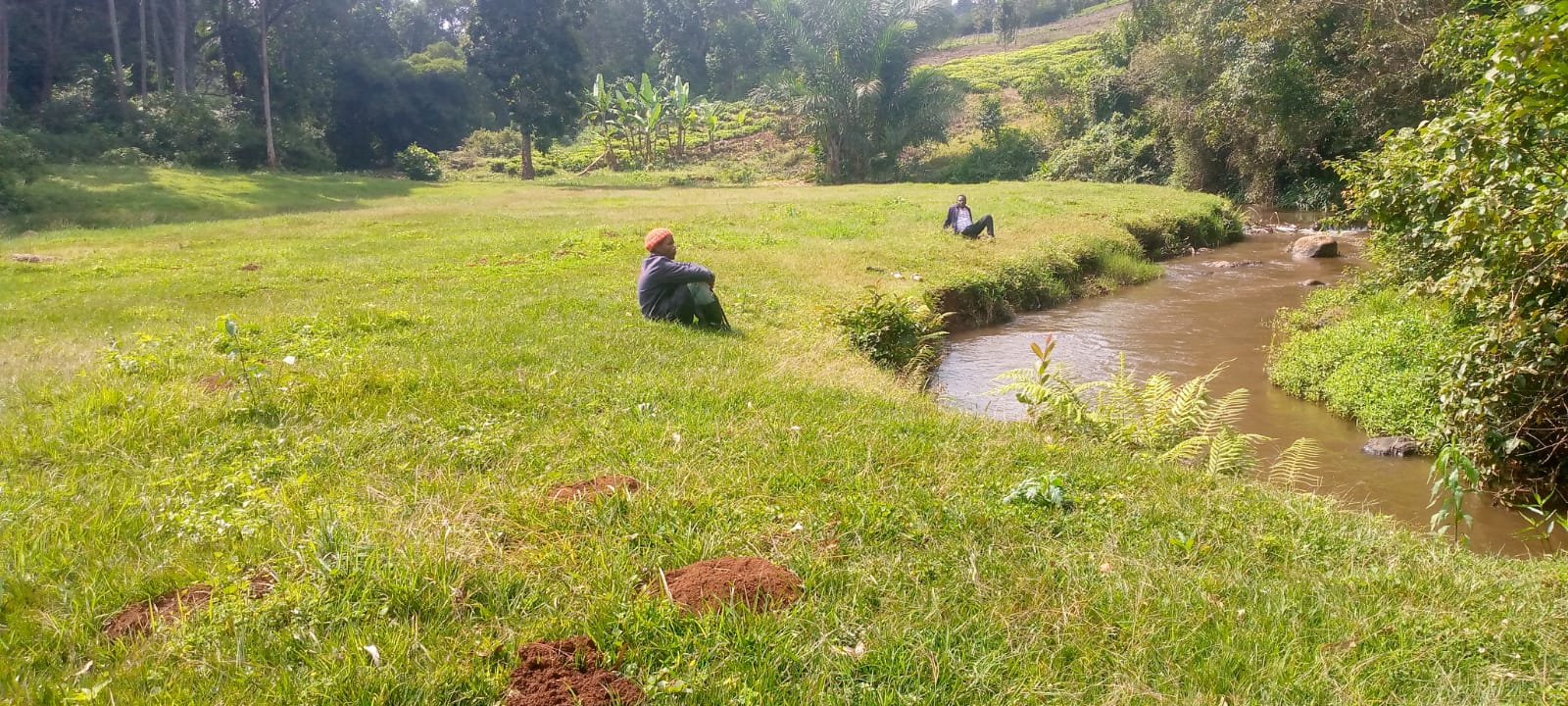
The conservation area surrounding Gogo Springs in Mukuuri, Embu

Gogo Salt Lick is a naturally occurring salt lick located in Embu County, Kenya.

== History ==
It has been known as a place of Mûnyû (salt) for hundreds of years in Embu land, since the founding of the Embu Community.

According to Mbeere Historical Texts written in 2005 by Kenyan historian and author Mwaniki Kabeca (10 August 1944 – 13 March 2023), Gogo is where Mwenendega, the founder of Embu tribe, met his wife Nthara.

Kabeca's book narrates that "Mwenendega," who lived near the current Mwenendega grove in Runyenjes, took his cattle to drink at the Gogo Salt Lick and found a girl. The girl spoke with him and made him swear never to tell her negative things or abuse her, as there would be consequences.

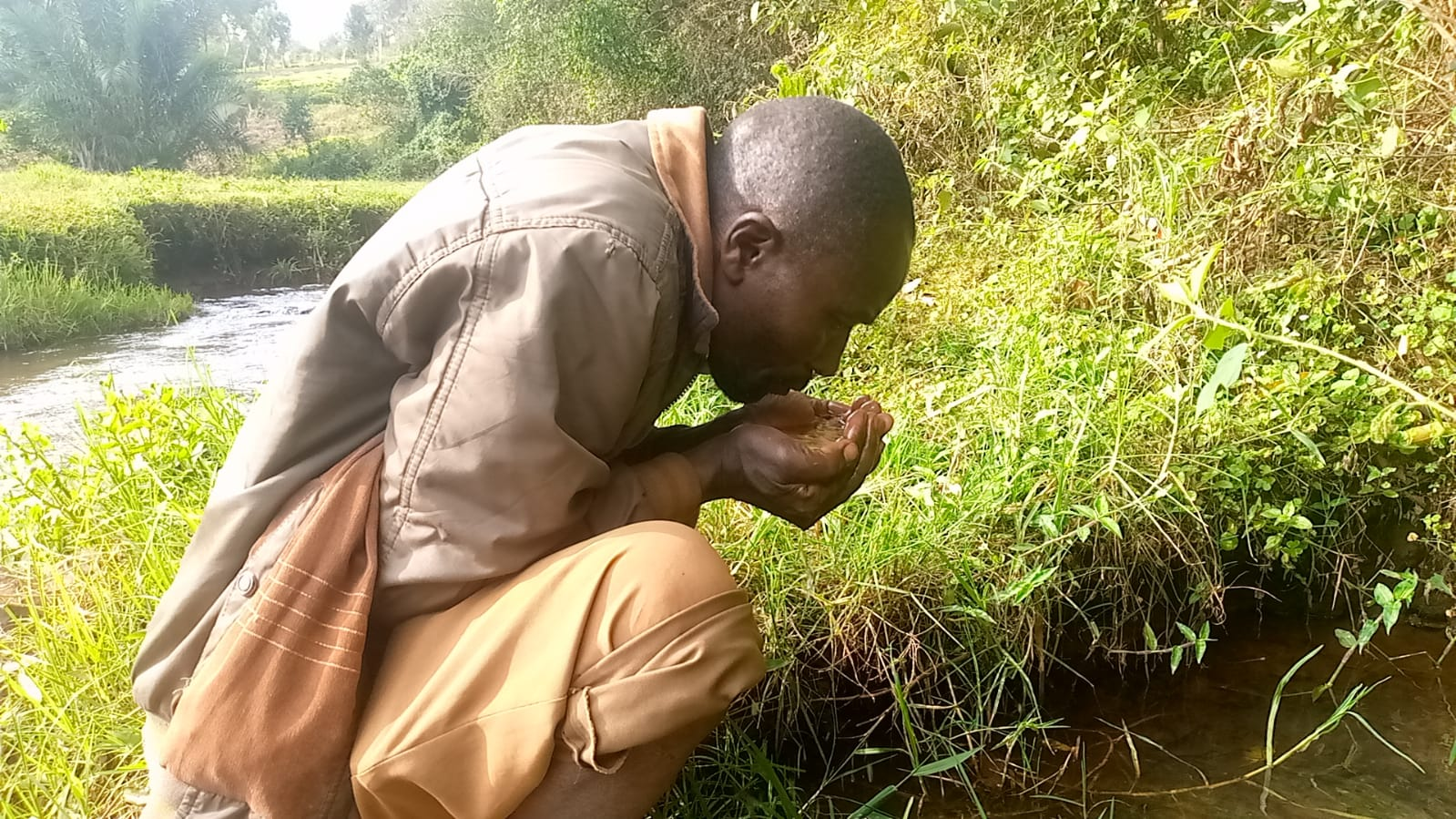
Suleiman Nyaga quenches his thirst with the mineral, salty waters of Gogo springs in Mukuuri Location, Embu County.

== Geography and location ==
Gogo Salt Lick is located in Mukuuri, near the banks of the Gogo River that separates Mûkûûrî and Gitare at the edge of a ridge called Mürurîrî. At least five acres on the banks of the Gogo River, surrounding the salt lick, have been reserved for community use. The five-acre Gogo meadow, which surrounds the salt lick, is populated by indigenous trees.

== Chemistry of Salt Licks ==
The Gogo Salt Lick is an area of water puddles fed by slow seeping springs and traditionally used by wildlife and livestock. The salty water that slowly comes from underground empties into the Gogo River. Salt licks occur in areas of both sedimentary and volcanic bedrock. They occur rarely in granitic bedrock except where overlain by calcareous glacial till.

Well established mineral licks, like Gogo, appear as open muddy areas and are characterised by well-worn trails radiating from them. Wild animals, like buffaloes, gazelles, and zebras, and domestic animals, like cattle, goats and sheep, go to salt licks to ingest crucial sodium and chloride minerals, which they need to survive.
