= Adan Mohammed =

Kenyan banker and entrepreneur

- Somali: Aadan Maxamed; Arabic: آدم محمد
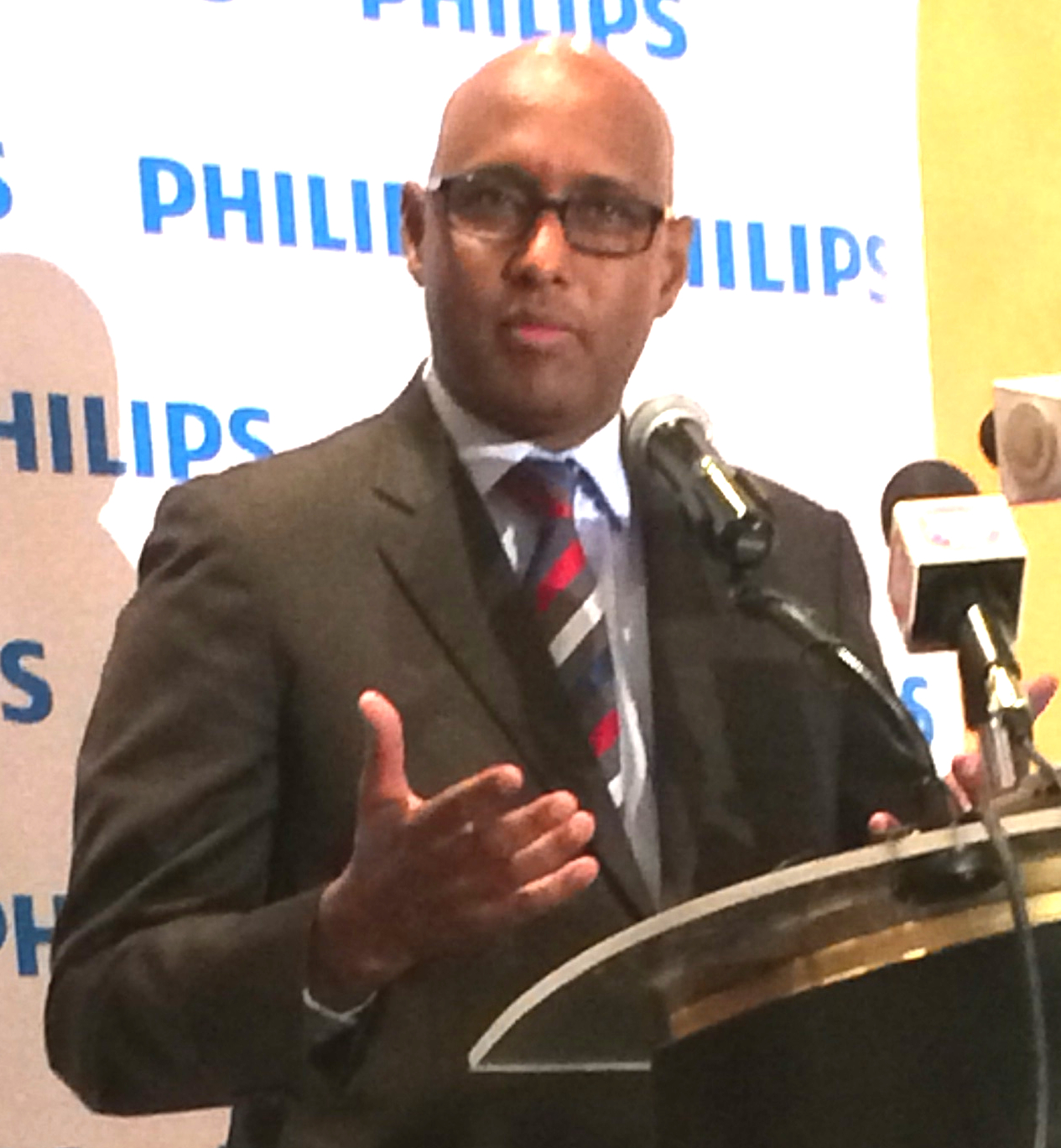

Former Cabinet Secretary for Industrialization and Enterprise Development and current Economic advisor to the president of the Republic of Kenya
- In office 15 May 2013 – 14 January 2020
- President: Uhuru Kenyatta

Personal details
- Born: December 1, 1963 (age 62–63) El Wak, North Eastern Province
- Spouse: Nafisa
- Children: 5
- Education: University of Nairobi (BCom); Harvard Business School (MBA)
- Profession: Chartered Accountant (ACA)
- Ethnicity: Somali Garre (Gurreh)
- Positions: MD, Barclays Kenya (2002-12)

Adan Abdulla Mohammed (Somali: Aadan Maxamed, Arabic: آدم محمد) is a prominent Kenyan banker and entrepreneur. He previously served as the managing director of Barclays Bank in East and West Africa. In 2013, he was sworn in as the Cabinet Secretary for Industrialization of Kenya.

== Biography ==
Aden was born to ethnic Somali parents from the Garre clan, in the town of El Wak, Mandera District, Kenya. He attended primary and secondary school. Adan was one of only two pupils at Mandera Primary School who made it to high school. He later joined Kangaru High School in Embu He proceeded to the University of Nairobi, from where he graduated in 1989 with a first class BCom degree.

After joining Pricewaterhouse Coopers, he was sent to London for training as a chartered accountant. He later switched his focus to consulting, and was posted to Shell in Nigeria for three years in this capacity. In 1994, Aden decided to pursue an MBA at the Harvard Business School, a degree he completed in 1998.

== Career ==
=== Barclays Bank ===
After receiving his MBA, Aden returned to Kenya and joined the country's Barclays branch as a Finance Director. Aden would rise through the ranks and eventually assume the position of Managing Director of Barclays bank in East and West Africa. Under his tenure, BBK won the Banker Awards 2009.

=== Cabinet Secretary for Industrialization and Enterprise Development ===
On 25 April 2013, Mohammed was named as Kenya's Cabinet Secretary for Industrialization, one of 18 Cabinet Secretary nominees to the new Uhuru Kenyatta administration. He was later sworn into office on 15 May 2013.

== See also ==
- Barclays Bank
