= Tana Hydroelectric Power Station =

- Location within Kenya
- Country: Kenya
- Location: Muranga County
- Coordinates: 00°47′08″S 37°15′55″E
- Purpose: Power
- Status: Operational
- Construction began: 2007
- Opening date: 2009; 17 years ago
- Owner: Kenya Electricity Generating Company

Dam and spillways
- Impounds: Tana River & Maragua River

Tana Hydroelectric Power Station
- Operator: Kenya Electricity Generating Company
- Commission date: 2009
- Type: Run-of-the-river
- Turbines: 2 x 4.3MW + 2 x 5.5MW
- Installed capacity: 20 MW (27,000 hp)

The Tana Hydroelectric Power Station is a 20 MW (27,000 hp) hydroelectric power station on the Tana River in southern Kenya.

== Location ==
Tana Hydroelectric Power Station is located in Muranga County, off the Nairobi-Embu Road, between Makuyu and Makutano, approximately 84 kilometres (52 mi) by road, northeast of Nairobi, the capital and largest city in Kenya. The coordinates of the power station are:0°47'08.0"S, 37°15'55.0"E (Latitude:-0.785550; Longitude:37.265284).

== Overview ==
The first power station on the site, drawing water from the Mathioya River was built in 1931. It was extended in 1955, drawing water from the Tana River, with capacity of 14.4MW, but generating only 10.4MW at time of decommissioning in 2007. Beginning in 2007, a new power station was constructed 30 metres (98 ft) away from the old one. The new power house has capacity of 19.6 MW (26,300 hp) and uses the same intake and discharge channels as the old station.

== See also ==
- List of power stations in Kenya
