= Runyenjes =

Town in Embu County, Kenya

Coordinates: 0°25′S 37°34′E

Runyenjes is the second largest town in Embu County, Kenya. It is located about 150 km from Nairobi, and 75 km from Mount Kenya, at an altitude of 1500m.The population is estimated at 58,000 people, the majority of which are the Embu People who speak Kiembu, a Bantu language, as well as Kiswahili and English, the two official languages in Kenya. The area offers scenic views, with densely wooded hills, gentle valleys, flowing streams and rivers, waterfalls, as well as small-scale farms.

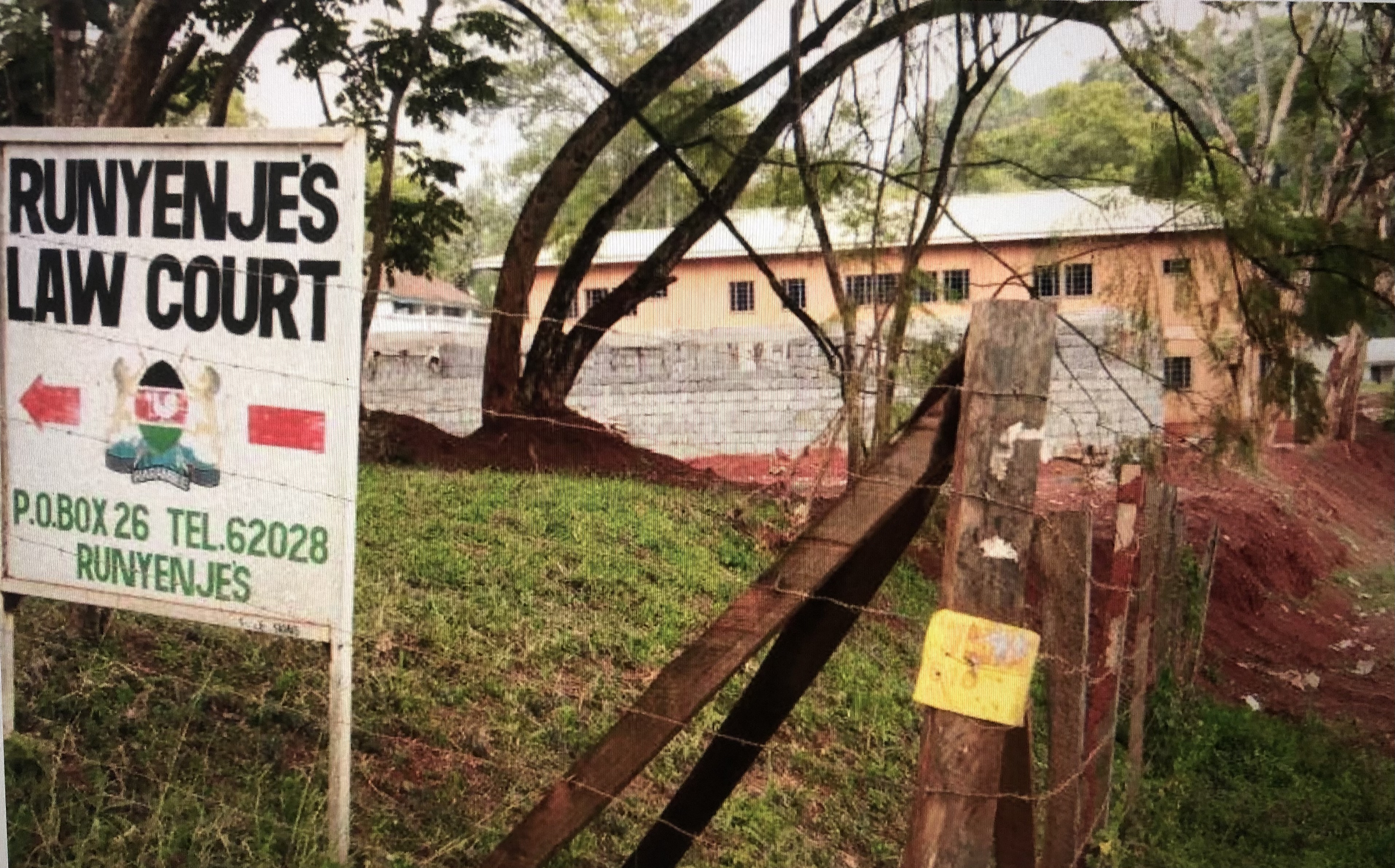

== Etymology ==
Runyenjes derives its name from a popular Chief Runyenje of the colonial era who ruled from Thuci River to Sagana.

== Geography ==
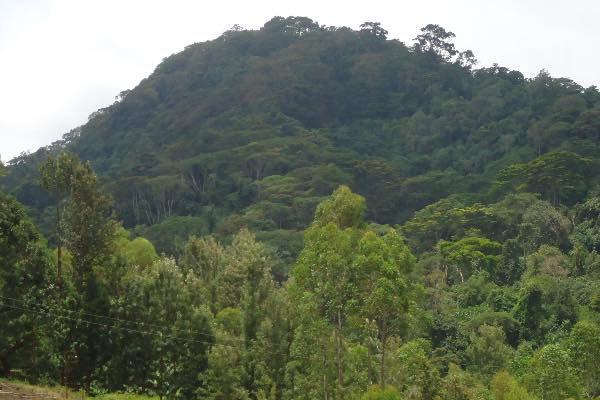
Kîrîmîri Forest Is an area dominated by tree vegetation in the Mukuuri locality of Runyenjes, Embu, in the country of Kenya.

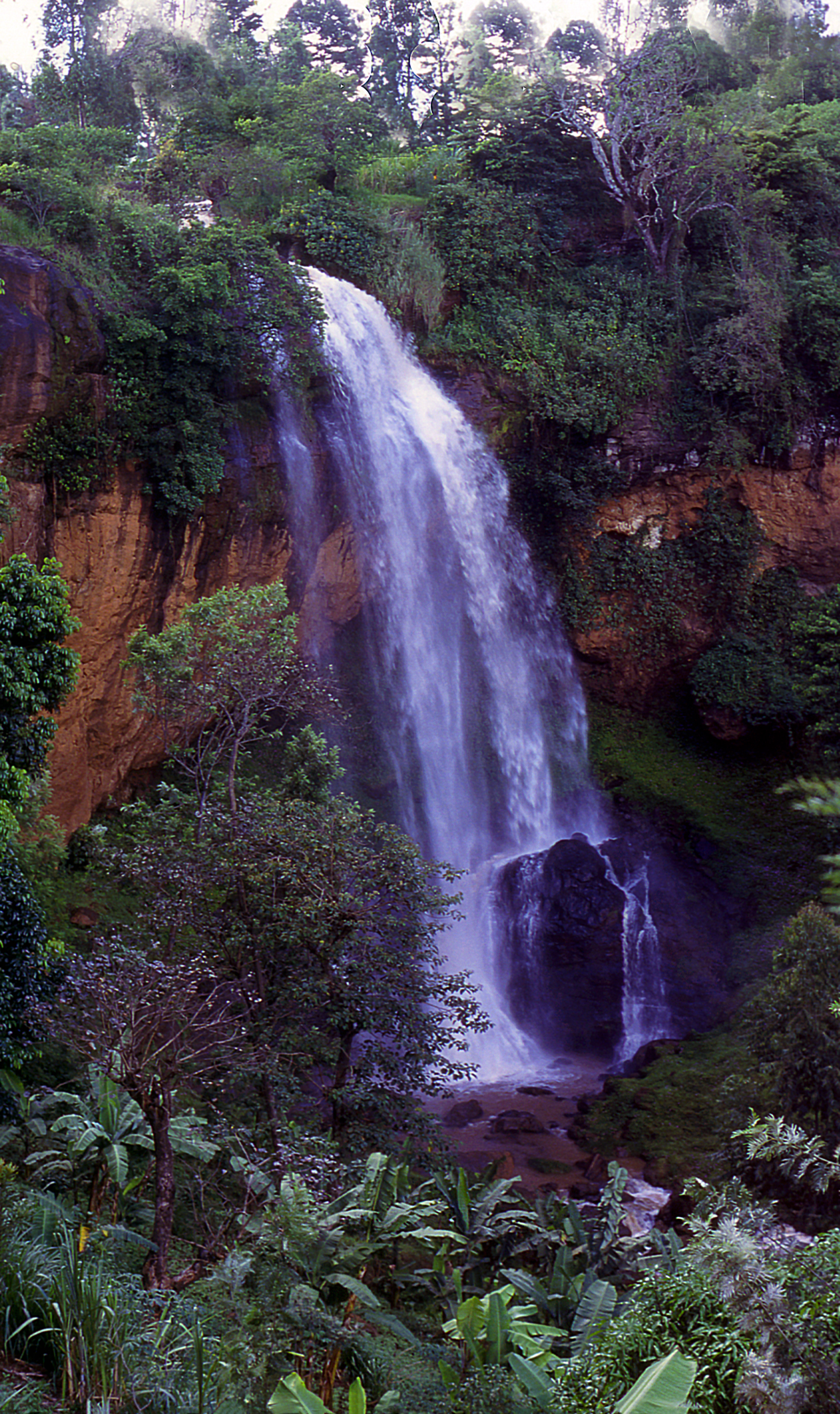
Kirimiri Waterfall is located a walking distance away from Runyenjes town.

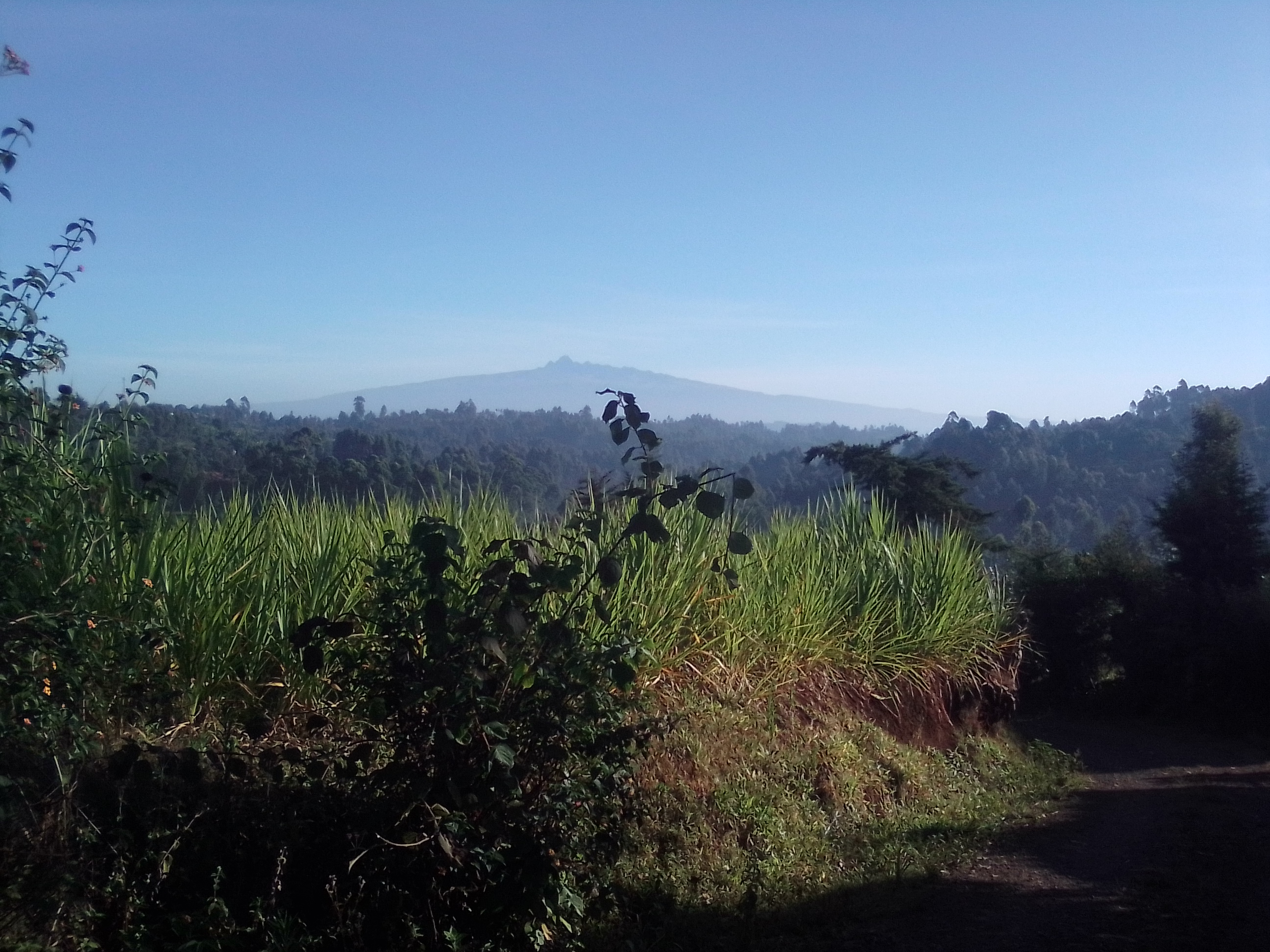
Mt. Kenya, Kenya is the highest mountain in Kenya and the second-highest in Africa, after Kilimanjaro.

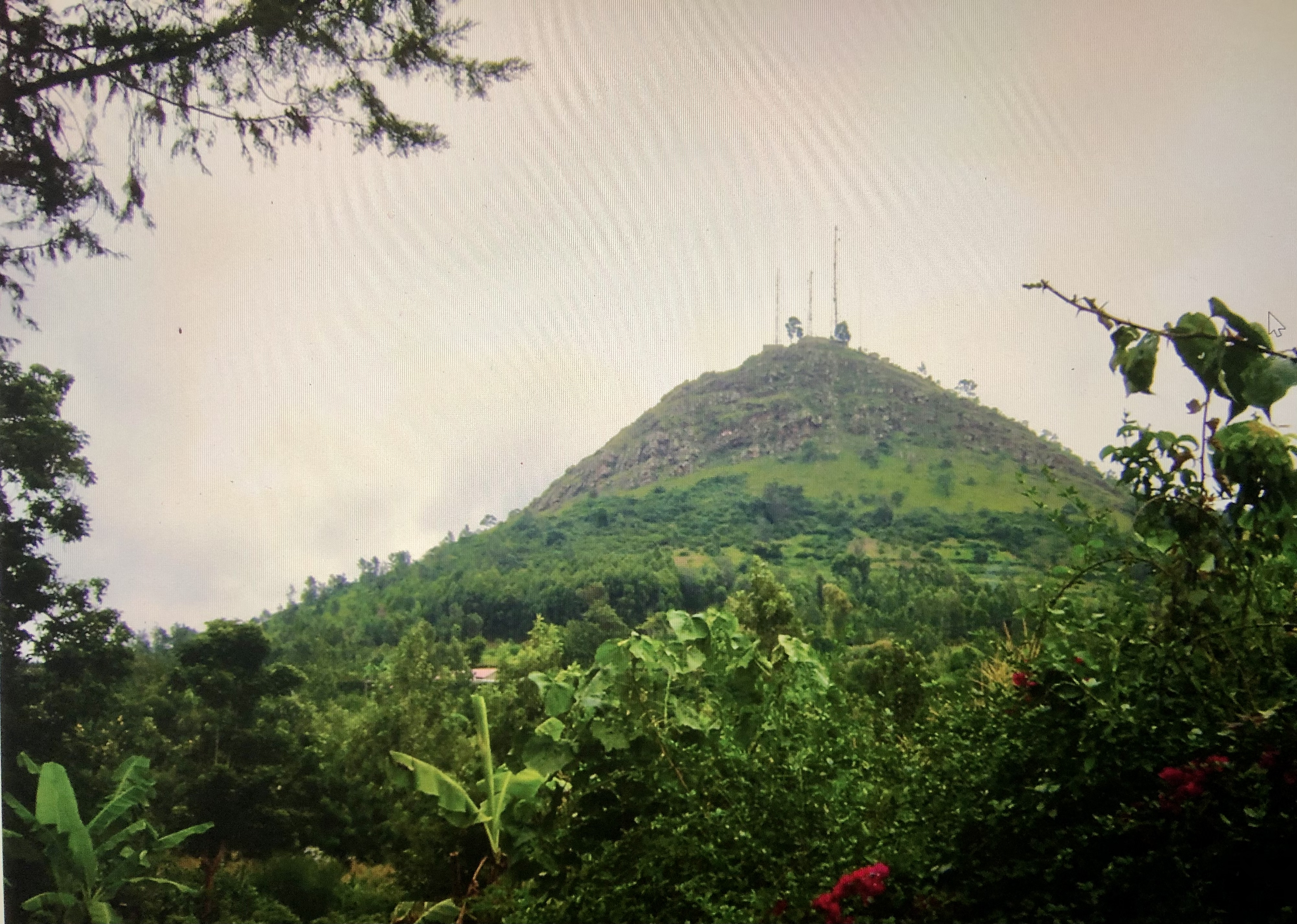
View of Karue Hill from Gikuuri Village in Runyenjes

Runyenjes is located at an altitude of 1495.62 m (4906.89 ft) and lies on the windward side of Mt. Kenya. It is about 150 km from Nairobi city and about 25 km from Embu town along the Nairobi-Meru-Isiolo road. The road from Runyenjes to Nairobi is tarmacked and well-maintained. A drive along this road from Runyenjes town towards Embu-Nairobi offers scenic views of the Karue and Kirimiri hills, nearby waterfalls, and on a clear sky, a great view of Mt. Kenya. The section of this road from Runyenjes town to Meru town via Chuka town is also quite scenic offering views ranging from densely wooded hills, gentle valleys, flowing streams, and rivers, as well as, tea and coffee small-scale farms.

According to Google Maps, you can walk non-stop from Runyenjes town to the top of Mt. Kenya in approximately 18 hours and 31 minutes, a distance of about 74 km.

Towns surrounding or nearby Runyenjes include Kianjokoma, Karurumo, Kigumo, Kathageri, Mukuuri, Kanja, Mufu, Rukuriri, Ena, Gichiche, Kathanjuri, Kyeni, Makutano, Kiaragana, Kigaa and Nthagaiya.

== Demographics ==
The population of Runyenjes is estimated to be 58,000 people, majority of which are of the Embu People heritage and speak Kiembu, a Bantu language, as well as Kiswahili and English, the two official languages in Kenya.

== Government ==
Runyenjes serves as constituency and municipality.

== Religion ==
Similar to the rest of Embu County, most of the residents identify as Christians. There are several major Christian denominations churches located in or around the municipality, including but not limited to, the Anglican Church of Kenya, The Roman Catholic Church of Kenya, the SDA Church, and the Salvation Army Church. Well-known church buildings include ACK St. Philips Rukuriri and St. Joseph Mukasa Catholic Church, Mbiruri among, many others.
