= Makutano, Mwea, Kenya =

Makutano
- Location within Kenya
- Coordinates: 0.756663°S 37.278887°E
- Country: Kenya
- County: Embu County
- Time zone: UTC+3 (EAT)

Makutano is a settlement that straddles the border between Kenya's Embu County and Kirinyaga County.

== Location ==
The town is located at the junction where the Nairobi-Embu Road diverges from the Nairobi-Nyeri Road, approximately 88 kilometres (55 mi) northeast of Nairobi, the capital and largest city in the country. The coordinates of Makutano are 0°45'24.0"S, 37°16'44.0"E (Latitude:-0.756663; Longitude:37.278887).

== Overview ==
At the beginning of 2016, a dual carriage highway through Makutano, referred to as the Kenol–Makutano–Sagana–Marua Highway, part of the greater Cape to Cairo Road, was considered.

The 20 MW (27,000 hp) Tana Hydroelectric Power Station is located 4 kilometres (2 mi) southwest of Makutano.

== See also ==
- List of power stations in Kenya
- List of roads in Kenya
