= St Paul's Cathedral, Embu =

Anglican cathedral in Embu, Kenya

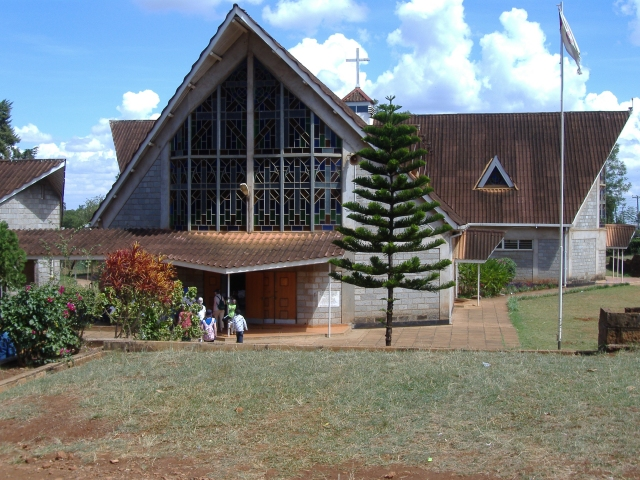
The view from the car park.

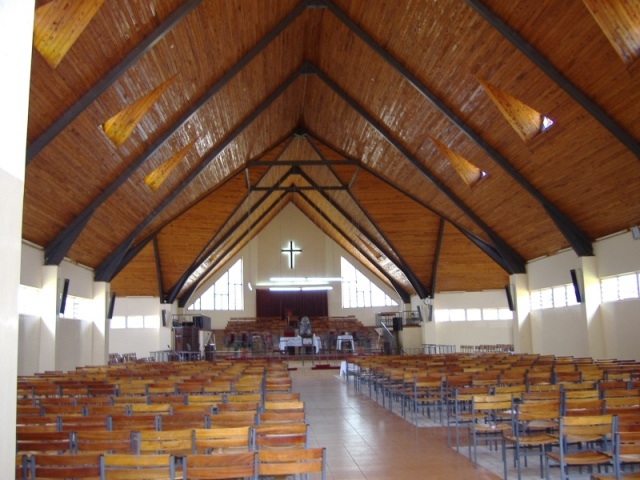
View from inside the Cathedral.

St Paul's Cathedral, Embu is a Cathedral of the Anglican Church of Kenya (ACK) located in the north of the town of Embu. It serves as the Bishop's seat in the Diocese of the same name, and as such is the mother church of a congregation of some 45,000.

Serving Embu and Wajir administrative districts and created on 1 July 1990, Embu Diocese was initially part of the Diocese of Mount Kenya East and in its present form came into existence on 1 July 1997, when the Diocese of Mbeere was split from it.

Newly built in 1988 the cathedral features windows given to it by Chelmsford Cathedral, a church with which it has had a link since 1979.
