= Muchangi Karemba =

Kenyan Member of parliament

The Honorable Muchangi Karemba

Member of Parliament (MP)
- Incumbent
- Assumed office August 2017
- Preceded by: Hon. Muchangi Karemba CBS, MP
- Constituency: Runyenjes Constituency

Personal details
- Born: 24 October 1984 (age 42) Embu County
- Citizenship: Kenyan
- Spouse: Martha Kariuki
- Education: Master of Arts in public administration
- Alma mater: Mount Kenya University

Eric Muchangi Njiru Karemba (born 24 October 1984) is a Kenyan politician and businessman who serves as the Member of Parliament for Runyenjes Constituency in Embu County. A member of the United Democratic Alliance (UDA), he is the first Akorino Member of Parliament in Kenya.

== Early life and education ==
Karemba attended Kiangungi Primary DEB School and Kegonge Secondary School, where he obtained his Kenya Certificate of Secondary Education (KCSE). He graduated from Kenyatta University with a Bachelor of Education (Arts), where he also served as a student leader. He later earned a Master of Arts in Public Administration from Mount Kenya University.

== Political career ==
Karemba is a member of the United Democratic Alliance which is the leading party in Kenya under president William Ruto, where he won with a landslide with 50,519 votes against his closest competitor Simba who had just above 11,000 votes. Previously, Karemba belonged to the Jubilee party, under President Uhuru Kenyatta. He is now a member of the United Democratic Alliance under William Ruto.

Karemba vied for the Runyenjes constituency parliamentary seat in 2013 under the Alliance Party of Kenya party and lost narrowly to Cecily Mbarire who is now the current governor of Embu County. He vied again in 2017 under Jubilee and won the election garnering 59,447 votes against his close competitor who had 5,184 votes. In parliament, Karemba was a sitting member of the education committee. He also served as a member of the Library and ICT committee of the National Assembly. He is currently the Chairman of the Labour Committee of the Kenyan National Assembly and also a member of the Liaison Committee composed of all chairpersons. Karemba is a close confidant of President Dr. William Ruto.

== Personal life ==
Karemba is married to Martha Kariuki.

== Education ==
Karemba went to Kiangungi primary DEB school and then to Kegonge secondary school where he sat his KCSE. Karemba is a graduate of Kenyatta University with a Bachelor of Education Arts He then joined Mount Kenya University for a Master of Arts in public administration.
