= Mbeere South Constituency =

Kenyan electoral constituency

Mbeere South
- constituency for the Parliament of Kenya
- Mbeere South Constituency within Embu County

- Embu County within Kenya
- County: Embu
- Population: 163,476
- Area: 1,312 km^{2} (506.6 sq mi)

Current constituency
- Number of members: 1
- Party: Independent
- Member of Parliament: Benard Muriuki Nebert
- Wards: 5

Mbeere South is an electoral constituency in Embu County, Kenya. It used to be known as Gachoka Constituency, one of two constituencies of the former Mbeere District. It has five wards; Mwea, Makima, Mbeti South, Mavuria and Kiambere Wards. The constituency was established for the 1988 elections.

The constituency's Member of Parliament is Hon. Col (Rtd) Geoffrey King'ang'i, who has been serving since the 2017 General Election. Hon. King'ang'i retired from the military to join politics and ran against Mutava Musyimi.

== Members of Parliament ==
Elections	MP	Party	Notes
1988	Hon Jeremiah Nyagah	KANU	One-party system.
1992	Hon Norman Nyagah	DP	
1997	Hon Joseph Nyagah	KANU	
2002	Hon Joseph Nyagah	NARC	
2007	Hon Mutava Musyimi	PNU	
2017	Hon. Geoffrey King'ang'i	The Jubilee Party	
2022	Hon. Nebart Bernard Muriuki	Independent Candidate	

== Locations and wards ==
Locations
Location	Population*
Karaba	18,544
Kiambere	12,698
Kianjiru	20,506
Makima	15,062
Mavuria	20,134
Mbeti South	16,087
Riakanau	14,181
Total	x
1999 census.

Wards
Ward	Registered Voters
Mwea	16,826
Mbeti South	17,775
Kiambere	7,894
Makima	10,623
Mavuria	19,025
Total	72,143
2017
