= Runyenje Wa Mukubo =

Rũnyenje Wa Mũkobo (sometimes spelled Rũnyenjĩ wa Mũkobo) was a "Paramount Chief" of the Embu people in Kenya in the early 20th century. Chief Runyenje was born in the Rũgusa area of the Embu district, near the present day location of the town of Rũnyenje's and its surrounding Runyenje's Constituency, which is named in honor of him.

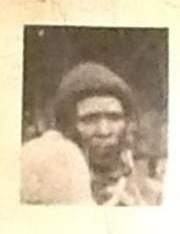
Rũnyenje wa Mukobo

The details of the process that saw Rũnyenje become a Paramount Chief are not readily available, but sources within the family have it that he was recruited by the early European administrators who wanted to establish an administrative post around Runyenje's, initially to accompany them to Mbeere as a guide. On returning, he had won the confidence and trust of the Europeans owing to demonstrated ability and they installed him as a Chief. One of his surviving sons Karanja (Kĩthu) recently showed family members the exact place where the Chief was laid to rest back in 1939 the year he died.

In addition to his administrative duties, the Chief was an elder among his people and a committed family man. He had more than ten wives and a host of elder friends and relations. Family sources trying to reconstruct their ancestral lineage trace the patriarch of the family as Mareru. Mareru had two sons Mũtema and Mũkobo. Mũkobo had a son Rũnyenje and a daughter Mwarwa Mũkobo. These tows had cousins Mũnoi and Masaria. The two family branches have remained close to this day although many of the more recently born family members do not know each other yet.

The Chief had thirteen (13) sons and many daughters. Today 17 August 2012, only Karanja (1918) and Matĩ (1930) survive. Nguũ (1912) died on 8 January 2013 aged 100 years. Phares Njeru(1925) died in 2010 and is survived by his two wives, 12 children and their families. According to the Official Gazette of the Government of Kenya, Runyenje Wa Mukobo was nominated by the Government to serve as a member of the Embu District Local Native Council on 8 June 1925 and reappointed 14 June 1928. He also features in the list of Official Headmen for Kagaari Location on 12 September 1929.

The family ancestral land is largely within the Rũguca area near the Present day Runyenje's township which was earlier on known as Ngabũrĩ. The land on which the current Embu East District Headquarters stands belonged to the Runyenje family as part of the larger Ega-Mataũ Rĩa Andũ a Njũkĩ clan although details of how the donation happened are available although family sources indicated that the Chief allowed the Government of the time (of which he was part) to set up the administrative station establishment on part of the family land. For this the family has always taken pride.
