= John Muchiri =

Kenyan politician

John Muchiri is a Kenyan politician and a member of the 11th parliament of Kenya for Manyatta Constituency, Embu County on the ticket of The National Alliance and with support of Jubilee Coalition. Elected in 2013, Muchiri served on the house committee on Public Investment and Departmental Committee on Health. According to Mzalendo Trust, Muchiri is one of the “lazy MPs” in the parliament haven spoken only nine times during his term in the lowerhouse.
