= Mutava Musyimi =

Kenyan politician

Mutava Musyimi

Mutava Musyimi (born 1952) is a Kenyan politician. He belongs to the Party of National Unity and was elected to represent the Gachoka Constituency in the National Assembly of Kenya since the 2007 Kenyan parliamentary election.

== Early life and family ==
Mutava Musyimi was born in 1952 to Tabitha Kisilu and veteran politician Stephen Kisilu (both deceased) in Riakanau village, Embu District. He is the third born of eight children. He grew up in a Christian home, and attended Riakanau Primary School from 1959 to 1965. He later joined the prestigious Kangaru School, Embu in 1969. Here Mutava was the secretary of the Christian Union which represented the School in Church affairs, Music, Drama and supported the local Sunday Schools by providing teachers and organising music competitions. He regularly urged especially new joiners at the School to pray for his success at the 'O' level exams which he passed and proceeded to the Schools 'A' Levels. He attended the University of Nairobi (Kenyatta Campus- which later became Kenyatta University) in 1972 to pursue a Bachelor of Education degree. It was during this time that he felt the call to become a man of the cloth. After much thought, prayer and consulting, he decided to follow this route, though it took him down a different path. He later joined University of London for a Bachelor of Divinity degree and thereafter the Trinity Divinity School, Illinois for a Master of Theology degree. Upon returning to Kenya, he joined the Nairobi Baptist Church as a Pastor from 1979- 1993. He married his wife Nyambura Musyimi on February 4, 1984 and later had two children; a daughter, Mueni-Nyokabi (25), a lawyer and theology teacher and a son, Syano (23) a PhD candidate.

== The Church ==
It was during his tenure at Nairobi Baptist Church that he came to the limelight as he spoke openly against the excesses of the Moi era. He later said, '...it is at Nairobi Baptist Church I started to see the state and individuals...and the pulpit as a powerful place for speaking out against injustice...'. He joined the National Council of Churches of Kenya (NCCK) as the Secretary General and served until 2007. Under his leadership, NCCK was very vocal on human rights issues, democracy and constitutionalism. Introspectively, NCCK made huge leaps in achieving its mandate including; financial stability and sustainability, advocacy and strengthening of its systems and priorities. He led the interfaith Ufungamano Initiative that was instrumental in shaping and achieving Kenya's new Constitution.

== The State ==
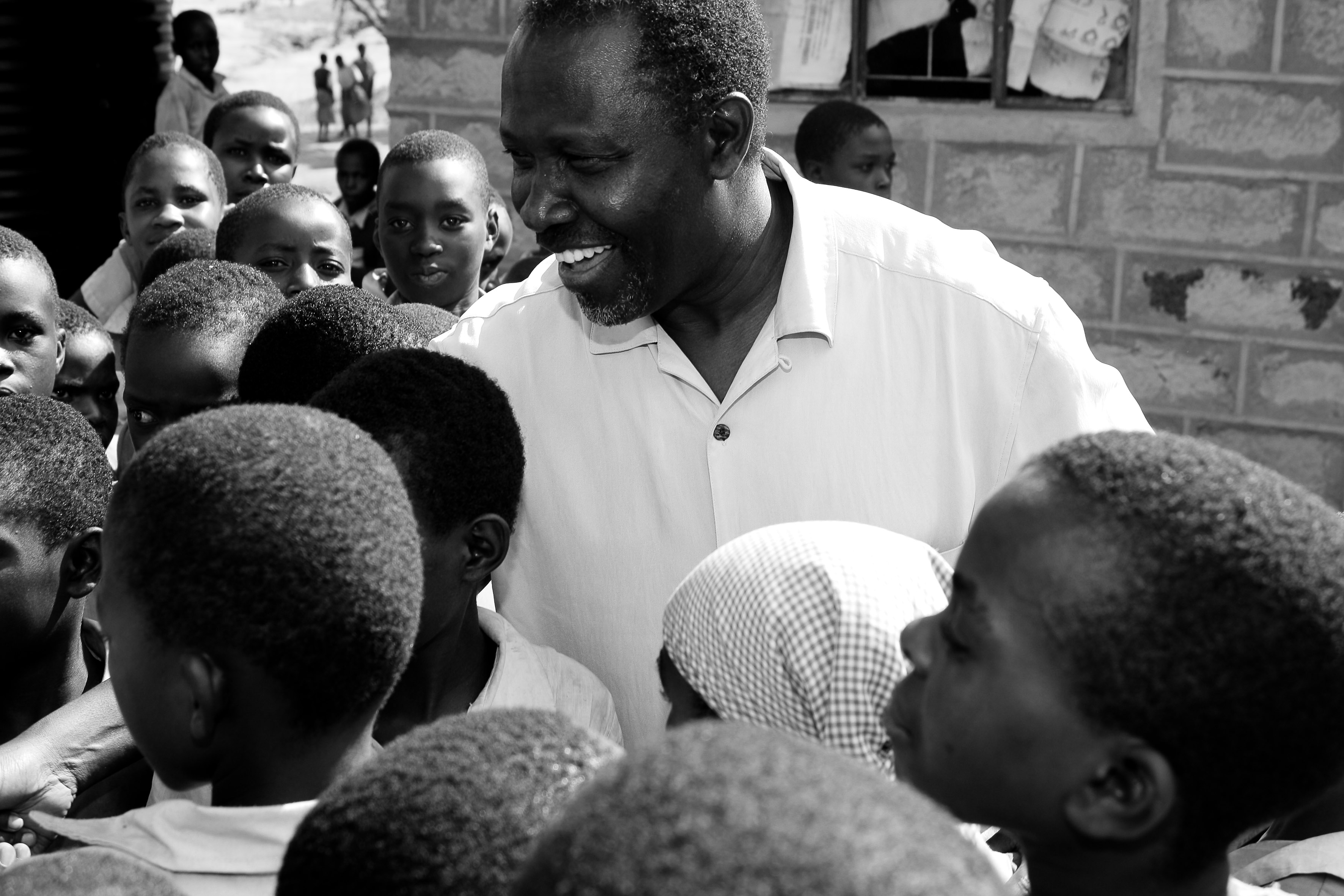
Mutava Musyimi with Children in Gachoka

In 2007 Mutava left NCCK and ran for Parliament as Gachoka's MP. He ran against Joseph Nyagah and won, defeating the fifty (50) year old hold the Nyaga family had on the constituency. During his tenure, Gachoka Constituency has seen improved infrastructure including new roads, piped water, electrification and better utilization and monitoring of Constituency Development Funds (CDF). In Parliament he is the current chair of the Lands and Natural Resources Committee, and a member of the Justice and Legal Affairs Committee. He has been touted by several media publications to run for presidency.

== Hobbies ==
His hobbies include farming, football, art appreciation, and meeting people. He likes to read biographies and African literature. He says "...I'm particularly interested in the works of the likes of Chinua Achebe and Wole Soyinka...it is interesting to see how they capture the disruption of [African] society by colonialism, religion..." Mutava is currently working his way through the Bible in Swahili. He does not like movies, but when pushed on it admits to be partial to Meryl Streep especially in Out of Africa. He admires Nelson Mandela for his sacrifice and patience, Nobel Laureate Wangari Maathai for her passion and persistence, Winston Churchill for his courage and discernment of the times and his late father because he was '...a complete person. In faith, family, politics, enterprise and community...' Asked what historical figure he would have over for dinner if he could he answered King David of the Bible and Mahatma Gandhi. The king, because of his ability to blend all his different capacities into one human being, and the Mahatma for his deep reflections.

== Presidential ambitions ==
Mutava has declared his intentions to vie for the presidential seat in Kenya's 2012 General Elections. He launched his candidacy on July 2, 2011 in Nakuru. His slogan is 'It's Time!' or 'Ni Sasa' (translated into Swahili). His symbol is a lit candle. He is reported to be pursuing the nomination of the Democratic Party of Kenya when it selects its flag bearer.

== Bibliography ==
1. https://web.archive.org/web/20110324125000/http://www.musyimilaw.com/staff.html
2. https://web.archive.org/web/20110614103145/http://www.standardmedia.co.ke/columnists/InsidePage.php?id=2000032533&cid=501&
3. http://www.standardmedia.co.ke/InsidePage.php?id=%202000003907&cid=501&story=Learning%20from%20the%20%91Gachoka%20model%92%5B%5D
4. Results of the Kenyan parliamentary election, 2007
5. http://www.kenyaelections.com/area/elections-database/
6. http://rescuekenya.wordpress.com/2008/02/21/ufungamano-initiative-one-kenya-one-people-keeping-the-country-together-after-the-general-election/
7. http://www.unhcr.org/refworld/publisher,IRBC,QUERYRESPONSE,KEN,3df4be5211,0.html
8. http://allafrica.com/stories/201011081213.html
9. http://www.standardmedia.co.ke/archives/mag/InsidePage.php?id=1144010177&cid=349&%5B%5D
