= List of counties of Kenya by population =

This is a list of the counties of Kenya by population, ranked according to the latest estimate. Past census data (1969, 1979, 1989, 1999, 2009 and 2019) is included for comparison. The counties of Kenya were created by the 2010 Constitution of Kenya and their size and boundaries are based on 1992 districts.

Rank (2023)	County	Population 2023	Population 2019	Population 2009	Population 1999	Population 1989	Population 1979	Percents, of total (2023)
1	Nairobi County	4,434,756	4,397,073	3,138,369	2,143,254	1,324,570	827,775	9.22%
2	Kiambu County	2,652,880	2,417,735	1,623,282	1,389,723	914,412	686,290	5.15%
3	Nakuru County	2,347,849	2,162,202	1,603,325	1,187,039	849,096	522,709	4.56%
4	Kakamega County	2,002,435	1,867,579	1,660,651	1,296,270	...	...	3.89%
5	Bungoma County	1,786,973	1,670,570	1,375,063	1,011,524	679,146	503,935	3.47%
6	Meru County	1,625,982	1,545,714	1,356,301	1,102,930	...	...	3.16%
7	Kilifi County	1,577,335	1,453,787	1,109,735	825,855	591,903	430,986	3.06%
8	Machakos County	1,487,758	1,421,932	1,098,584	906,644	...	...	2.89%
9	Kisii County	1,344,907	1,266,860	1,152,282	952,725	...	...	2.61%
10	Mombasa County	1,311,860	1,208,333	939,370	665,018	461,753	341,148	2.55%
11	Narok County	1,284,204	1,157,873	850,920	536,341	398,272	210,306	2.49%
12	Kajiado County	1,268,261	1,117,840	687,312	406,054	258,659	149,005	2.46%
13	Uasin Gishu County	1,257,330	1,163,186	894,179	622,705	445,530	300,766	2.44%
14	Kisumu County	1,248,474	1,155,574	968,909	804,289	664,086	482,327	2.42%
15	Migori County	1,234,082	1,116,436	917,170	666,784	...	...	2.40%
16	Homa Bay County	1,231,659	1,131,950	963,794	751,332	...	...	2.39%
17	Kitui County	1,229,790	1,136,187	1,012,709	819,250	652,603	464,283	2.39%
18	Murang'a County	1,112,288	1,056,640	942,581	736,273	858,063	648,333	2.16%
19	Trans-Nzoia County	1,069,039	990,341	818,757	575,662	393,682	259,503	2.07%
20	Siaya County	1,059,458	993,183	842,304	718,964	639,439	474,516	2.06%
21	Makueni County	1,042,300	987,653	884,527	771,545	...	...	2.02%
22	Turkana County	1,022,773	926,976	855,399	450,860	184,060	142,702	1.98%
23	Busia County	968,763	893,681	743,946	552,099	401,658	297,841	1.88%
24	Mandera County	959,236	867,457	1,025,756	250,372	123,787	105,601	1.86%
25	Kericho County	954,896	901,777	752,396	...	...	...	1.85%
26	Nandi County	951,460	885,711	752,965	578,751	433,613	299,319	1.85%
27	Kwale County	944,464	866,820	649,931	496,133	383,053	288,363	1.83%
28	Bomet County	939,761	875,689	730,129	...	...	...	1.82%
29	Garissa County	927,031	841,353	623,060	392,510	124,835	128,867	1.80%
30	Wajir County	870,636	781,263	661,941	319,261	122,769	139,319	1.69%
31	Nyeri County	835,408	759,164	693,558	661,156	607,292	486,477	1.62%
32	Baringo County	733,333	666,763	555,561	403,141	347,990	203,792	1.42%
33	Nyandarua County	695,531	638,289	596,268	479,902	345,420	233,302	1.35%
34	West Pokot County	676,326	621,241	512,690	308,086	225,449	158,652	1.31%
35	Nyamira County	657,502	605,576	598,252	498,102	...	...	1.28%
36	Kirinyaga County	653,112	610,411	528,054	457,105	391,516	291,431	1.27%
37	Embu County	648,425	608,599	516,212	449,149	370,138	263,173	1.26%
38	Vihiga County	625,765	590,013	554,622	498,883	...	...	1.21%
39	Laikipia County	561,223	518,560	399,227	322,187	218,957	134,524	1.09%
40	Marsabit County	515,292	459,785	291,166	174,957	129,262	96,216	1.00%
41	Elgeyo-Marakwet County	495,239	454,480	369,998	284,494	216,487	148,868	0.96%
42	Tharaka-Nithi County	416,383	393,177	365,330	306,443	...	...	0.81%
43	Taita–Taveta County	363,990	340,671	284,657	246,671	207,273	147,597	0.71%
44	Tana River County	352,549	315,943	240,075	180,901	128,426	92,401	0.68%
45	Samburu County	348,298	310,327	223,947	143,547	108,884	76,908	0.68%
46	Isiolo County	315,937	268,002	143,294	100,861	70,078	43,478	0.61%
47	Lamu County	167,332	143,920	101,539	72,686	56,783	42,299	0.32%
	Kenya	51,525,702	47,564,296	38,610,097	28,686,607	21,443,636	15,327,061	100%

== See also ==
- Counties of Kenya
