= Kanja =

- Location within Kenya
- Coordinates: 0.38°S 37.53°E
- Country: Kenya
- Province: Eastern Province
- Time zone: UTC+3 (EAT)

Kanja is a small settlement in Embu County in Kenya's Eastern Province, at about 1,785 metres above sea level.

It falls under the Runyenjes Constituency, one of four electoral constituencies in Embu County, and specifically in the ward Kagaari North. Kagaari North had 12,893 registered voters in September 2005. The area is prone to mosquitoes and Accu weather sometimes issues warnings for "high mosquito activity" in the area.

== Coffee Factories ==
The Kanja Coffee Factory is located in the area. Having started operation in 1979, this is where the coffee beans from hundreds of contributing farmers - currently around 1 100 of them from the surrounding villages of Kanja, Mbogori and Irangi - are processed. Each of these small-scale farmers owns an average of 130-200 coffee trees. The Kanja Coffee Factory receives assistance from the Coffee Management Services group, which hosts training and education programs for small-holder farmers in the area, to ensure sustained industry growth.

The Kirimiri Coffee Factory, located four kilometres away near Mukuuri township, was built in the early 1980s and also has hundreds of contributing farmers from the area, each owning an average of 2 hectares of land and 250 coffee trees. Farmers receive yearly training from the factory manager. The factory uses water from the Kirimiri-Ena River.

== Schools ==
Ack Kanja Primary School is a public primary school, located within Kanja. Postal address: P.O. Box 83 – 60118 Kanja, Kenya.
