= Musili Wambua =

Kenyan professor

Paul Musili Wambua (born 1961) is a full professor of law and scholar in maritime law. He is a former associate dean at the University of Nairobi School of Law; a former dean at Kabarak University School of Law; a former commissioner with the Constitution of Kenya Review Commission (CKRC); a former chairman of the Betting Control and Licensing Board (BCLB); and former chairman of the Task Force on the Review of Maritime Laws in Kenya. In 2016, President Uhuru Kenyatta appointed him as the first chancellor of University of Embu, where he has remained since.
