= Emillio Kathuli =

Kenyan politician

Emillio Kathuli is a Kenyan politician. He belongs to the Democratic Party and was elected to represent the Manyatta Constituency in the National Assembly of Kenya since the 2007 Kenyan parliamentary election.
