= Stanley Nyagah =

Kenyan member of parliament (September 12, 1936 – October 2, 2006)

Member of Parliament for Embu North
- In office 1983–1988
- Constituency: Embu North (now Runyenjes and Manyatta)

Personal details
- Born: September 12, 1936 Mũkũũrĩ, Embu, Kenya
- Died: October 2, 2006
- Party: Independent (or specify if known)
- Spouse: Jane Nyagah
- Children: 6
- Education: University of Wisconsin; Syracuse University (Maxwell School of Government)
- Occupation: Educationist, civil servant, technocrat, entrepreneur, politician
- Known for: Founding KASNEB; rural electrification and education initiatives in Embu
- Nickname: Kĩthũng'a

Stanley Nyagah (September 12, 1936 – October 2, 2006), nicknamed Kĩthũng'a, was a Kenyan educationist, civil servant, technocrat and, entrepreneur who, between 1983 -1988, served as Member of Parliament for Embu North constituency, now split into Runyenjes constituency and Manyatta constituency. His campaign symbol was a key (rũvungoro). The key symbolized the opening up of hitherto inaccessible public resources to the masses. While in parliament, he served on the public investments committee.

He is credited with being a visionary and development oriented leader. Nyagah initiated a rural electrification programme, piped water supply system and improvements in the road network in Embu North. He helped set up two boarding primary schools (Kubukubu and Kamûthatha).

He was nicknamed Kĩthũng'a in reference to heavy duty Bedford trucks that ferried timber from Mt Kenya forest. Since there were no roads in the forest, the truck would flatten vegetation to carve out a path.

== Early life and education ==
Nyagah was born on the slopes of Mt Kenya at Ka-mavĩndĩ (the place of bones) farm in Mũkũũrĩ sub-location on 12 September 1936 to Esther Kerû and Stanley Ngaithia, the 4th of their 10 children. He belongs to the Rwamba clan.

He went to Muragari School. Thereafter, he attended St Paul's High School - Kevote and went for 'A' levels in Uganda, before proceeding to the US. He enrolled at the University of Wisconsin for his BA and Syracuse University - Maxwell School of Government in upstate New York for his MPA, graduating summa cum laude. He lived and worked in Bedford, UK while he studied accounting and was the first Kenyan to receive certification from the Association of Chartered Certified Accountants (ACCA), the global body for professional accountants.

== Career ==
On 1 July 1967, he was appointed the head of department (local government) at the Kenya Institute of Administration (now the Kenya School of Government). Later, Nyagah rose to the position of deputy principal at the same institution.

He founded the Kenya Accountants and Secretaries National Examinations Board (KASNEB) in 1969 and served as its pioneer secretary.

In the 1970s he worked as a senior deputy permanent secretary in the Office of the President in the Directorate of Personnel Management. He was an authority in local government and public policy/finance.

Upon retirement in 1988, he cultivated his coffee estates, particularly the 'Rûiru 11' variety of the Arabica coffee plant. Nyagah processed the coffee beans at his mill which he then supplied to the Kenya Planters' Cooperative Union at Sagana. He was a dairy farmer and reared Friesian, Jersey and Guernsey cows.

== Personal life ==
Nyagah had three children with his first wife. After his wife’s death in 1970, Nyagah remarried to Jane Nyagah, with whom he also had three children.

== Death ==
Stanley Nyagah died on October 2, 2006 after a period of infirmity.
