= Embu, Kenya =

Town in Embu County, Kenya

Embu
- Municipality
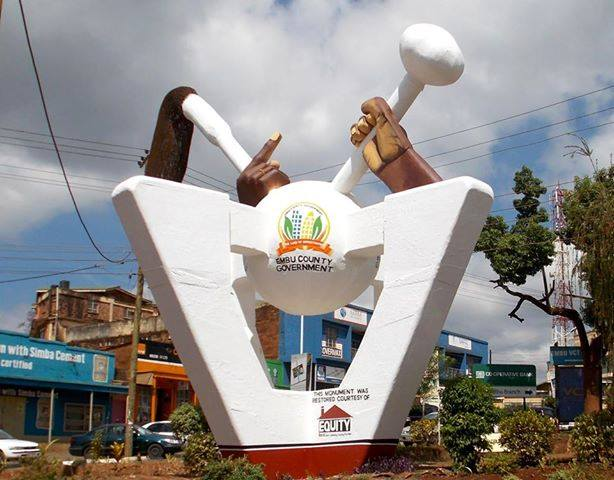
- Monument of Embu

- Location in Kenya
- Coordinates: 0°32′20″S 37°27′30″E
- Country: Kenya
- Region: Mount Kenya region
- County: Embu County
- Founded: 1906

Government
  - Type: Municipal Board
  - Chairperson: Eustace Mbogo
  - Vice Chairperson: Doris Mwende Mugendi
  - Municipal Manager: Catherine Nyaga

Area
  - Municipality: 102 km^{2} (39 sq mi)
- Elevation: 1,350 m (4,430 ft)

Population (2026)
  - Density: 637/km^{2} (1,650/sq mi)
  - Urban: 92,210
  - Metro: 204,979
- Demonym: Embian
- Time zone: UTC+3 (EAT)
- Postal Code: 60100
- Area code: 068
- Climate: Aw
- Website: embumunicipality.go.ke

Embu is the largest town in Embu County, Kenya. As of 2026, It has an estimated population of 92,210 making it the 36th-largest urban center in Kenya and the 11th-largest in the Mount Kenya region. It is located approximately 125 kilometres (78 mi) northeast of Nairobi towards Mount Kenya.

A major economic hub in the Mount Kenya region, Embu served as the provincial capital of the former Eastern Province and currently serves as the headquarters of Embu County in Kenya. It provides a place for trade, tourism and highway transit between Nairobi and the Northern Frontier.

== History ==
Embu town is a major trading centre in Eastern Kenya. For a long time, it was the economic centre for the Embu, Kikuyu, Meru and Kamba communities as well as other communities from central Kenya. Mbeere was carved out of the former Embu district in the 1990s and Siakago town, about 25 km (16 mi) east of Embu town, was made its headquarters.

The Embu people are believed to have originated from northwest Africa. They moved south to the Congo, then went eastwards to the coast of Kenya via Tanganyika. The Embu intermarried with natives and migrants from farther south (mostly Bantus) and later moved north towards Meru, leaving their relatives, the Gikuyu, at Ithanga. They then crossed Igambang'ombe ford. They settled at Gikuuri near the Maranga hills. Others settled at Tharaka but later left due to famine and moved to the current Embu.

It is believed as they moved towards the slopes of Mt Kenya, they encountered pygmy tribes such as the Agumba and the Zimba in the forest, some of whom were cannibalistic. They were cultivators, planting crops like sorghum, millet and sweet potatoes. Today, they have cash crops like coffee, tea, miraa and macadamia nuts.

== Geography ==
Embu is located on the foothills of Mount Kenya at an elevation of 1,350 metres (4,429 ft). The municipality formerly served as the headquarters of Kenya's Eastern Province and is now the administrative centre of Embu County, hosting major public institutions including Embu Provincial General Hospital.

The municipality slopes west to east, extending from Njukiri Forest to Muthatari over a radius of approximately 10 kilometres (6 mi). The municipality reaches its highest elevations near the Ruvingaci River in western Embu. Embu also has a small airstrip approximately 1 km (0.62 mi) long, located about 7.1 km (4.4 mi) southeast of the town centre.

The altitude and climate around Embu make the region a popular training area for Kenyan endurance athletes. Specialised training facilities are located at Kigari Teachers Training College, approximately 15 km (9.3 mi) north of Embu Town.

Embu Town is also known for its jacaranda trees, which bloom between October and November, depending on rainfall, and turn parts of the town purple.

Approximately 25 km (16 mi) north of Embu Town is the town of Kianjokoma, which serves as a commercial centre for nearby settlements including Miandari, Kathande, Kiriari, and Irangi. The town has experienced rapid growth due to the presence of the Mungania Tea Factory, as well as a county hospital and police line in the area. Other towns in Embu County include Kibugu, Karurumo, Rukuriri, Mukuuri, Kathageri, Kanja, and Manyatta.

=== Climate ===
Climate data for Embu, Kenya
Month	Jan	Feb	Mar	Apr	May	Jun	Jul	Aug	Sep	Oct	Nov	Dec	Year
Mean daily maximum °C (°F)	28.7 (83.7)	30.3 (86.5)	30.4 (86.7)	28.6 (83.5)	27.2 (81.0)	26.4 (79.5)	25.1 (77.2)	25.4 (77.7)	28.2 (82.8)	29.5 (85.1)	27.5 (81.5)	27.2 (81.0)	27.9 (82.2)
Mean daily minimum °C (°F)	13.7 (56.7)	14.3 (57.7)	16.3 (61.3)	17.4 (63.3)	17.2 (63.0)	15.6 (60.1)	15.2 (59.4)	15.2 (59.4)	15.8 (60.4)	16.9 (62.4)	16.4 (61.5)	14.7 (58.5)	15.7 (60.3)
Average precipitation mm (inches)	41 (1.6)	34 (1.3)	64 (2.5)	218 (8.6)	139 (5.5)	21 (0.8)	28 (1.1)	11 (0.4)	17 (0.7)	86 (3.4)	189 (7.4)	45 (1.8)	893 (35.2)
Average precipitation days	4	3	7	13	10	3	3	4	2	8	15	5	77
Source: World Meteorological Organization

== Religion ==
There are numerous Christian churches and ministries in Embu, including the Seventh Day Adventist, East African Pentecostal Churches (Dallas, Gakwegori, Kigumo, Kanginga, Kathari, Karurumo, Kiritiri among others), Anglican Church of Kenya's St. Paul's Cathedral, the Presbyterian Church of East Africa's Blue Valley, the National Independent Church of Africa, the African Independent Pentecostal Church of Africa (Majimbo, Kangaru Kathangariri, Kibugu, Kavutiri, Ndunduri, Itabua, Gichera, Makengi, Kirigiri), and the Roman Catholic Diocese of Embu's Sts. Peter and Paul Cathedral. The latter cathedral has a unique African-inspired design and is among the largest in Africa. Churches under Missions for Christ Ministries includes Kevote Family Church, Embu Town Family Church, Runyenjes Family Church, Kamugere Family Church and Kianjokoma Family Church. The National Independent Church of Africa is located at Gakwegwori (Mwamba Imara), Kianjokoma, Kiriari, Kithunguriri, Kamugere, Mukuuri, Keria, Kibugu, and Kavutiri.

Another Protestant church, the first encountered on entering Embu from Kirinyaga county, is that of the Kenya Assemblies of God (KAG). It is better known as the Eastern Gate assembly, as it is also the first church encountered on crossing into Eastern Province from all the Provinces except North Eastern.

Family Worship Church Inc is a Protestant Christian church founded in the early 1970s. Its headquarters are locared in Nembure and has branches in Manyatta, Kithimu, Kiandundu, Gaikiro, as well as Makengi, and is in the process of starting a branch in Embu town.

== Electoral subdivisions ==
Embu forms a municipality that has seven wards (Blue Valley, Itabua, Kamiu, Kangaru, Majengo, Matakari and Njukiri). All of them belong to Manyatta Constituency, which has a total of eleven wards. The remaining four are located within Embu County Council, the rural council of Embu.

== Notable residents ==
- Jeremiah J. M. Nyagah - former cabinet minister
- Joseph Nyagah - son of Jeremiah Nyagah and former cabinet minister
- Norman Nyagah - son of Jeremiah Nyagah and former Kamukunji M.P.
- Justin Muturi - Former Speaker of the National Assembly and Attorney General of KenyaKithinji Kiragu
- Patrick Njiru - Safari Rally driver
- Cardinal John Njue - Archbishop of Nairobi and former Bishop of Embu
- Martin Nyaga Wambora - first Governor of Embu; former Runyenjes MP and chair of Kenya Airports Authority
- Cecily Mutitu Mbarire - Second and current Embu Governor
- Peter Njeru Ndwiga - Former Manyatta M.P. and Former second Senator of Embu
- Mutava Musyimi - Mbeere South M.P.

== University education ==
- University of Embu
- Embu College
- Jeremiah Nyagah National Polytechnic
- Kenyatta University Embu Campus
- Manyatta Technical and Vocational College

== See also ==
- Embu people
- Embu County
