= Manyatta Constituency =

Kenyan electoral constituency

Manyatta Constituency is an electoral constituency in Kenya. It is one of four constituencies of Embu County and it was established for the 1997 elections. According to the 2019 population census, Manyatta has a total population of 206,678 people. The constituency houses most of administrative offices and headquarters including the county governor's residence and the former Eastern Province headquarters.

== Members of Parliament ==
Elections	MP	Party	Notes
1997	Peter Njeru Ndwiga	DP	
2002	Peter Njeru Ndwiga	NARC	
2007	Emillio Kathuli	DP |	
2013	Nyaga, John Muchiri	TNA	
2017	Nyaga, John Muchiri	Jubilee	
2022	Gitonga Mukunji	UDA	

== Locations and wards ==
Locations
Location	Population*
Gaturi South	14,482
Kithimu	19,431
Mbeti North	17,488
Embu Municipality	41,586
Ngandori	25,071
Nginda	31,271
Ruguru	20,204
Total	x
1999 census.

Wards
Ward	Registered Voters	
Blue valley	5,493	Embu municipality
Itabua	3,531	Embu municipality
Kamiu	3,049	Embu municipality
Kangaru	3,472	Embu municipality
Majengo	5,168	Embu municipality
Matakari	2,623	Embu municipality
Njukiri	3,679	Embu municipality
Gaturi south	5,989	Embu county
Kithimu	7,065	Embu county
Ngandori	15,177	Embu county
Nginda	13,171	Embu county
Total	68,417	
*September 2005.
