= Kithinji Kiragu =

Kìthìnji Kìragū (popularly known as KK), is a certified public accountant from Kenya. He holds a Master of Business Administration (MBA) from the University of Strathclyde, UK and Bachelor of Commerce (Accounting Option) from the University of Nairobi, Kenya.

As of 2014 he was a director responsible for public sector reforms consulting services at the ADP Group. Until June 2007, he was a partner in PricewaterhouseCoopers (PwC) responsible for public sector management advisory services in the Africa Central region, which covers most of Sub-Saharan Africa. He joined PwC in 2002, when ADP Group legacy firm and KK Consulting Associates merged with PwC. In 1995–98, he was chief technical adviser for public sector reform in the President's Office of the Government of Tanzania.

Since embarking on his consulting career, Kìthìnji has successfully carried out many and varied consulting assignments in governance, institutional, organisational, financial and socio-economic analyses, and systems design, implementation and management, in both private and public sectors. Besides, consulting extensively, he has lectured, published and presented papers on governance and public sector management in many regional and international forums..

After receiving his master's in 1979, Kìragū joined Coopers & Lybrand, now part of PricewaterhouseCoopers, as a management consultant. He rose through the ranks and became a director before founding his own firm, KK Consulting Associates. Since 2008, he has been chairman and director of Africa Development Professional Group Ltd., an independent consulting firm which also incorporated KK Consulting Africa. He had worked on a number of public sector reform projects in Kenya and Tanzania, including the Kenya Rural Access Roads Program, and he served as the chief technical adviser for public sector reforms in the Office of the President of Tanzania from 1995 until 1999. He also was a certified public accountant in Kenya.

On Jamhuri Day, 12 December 2006, President Mwai Kibaki awarded KK the Order of the Grand Warrior of Kenya (OGW). This was in recognition of his contributions to areas of capacity development and civil service reform and also as a facilitator of seminars for local senior government officials. In August 2010, the president appointed KK the chairman of the State Corporations Advisory Committee (SCAC) in his Office. In 2011 Kibaki bestowed on KK the honour of Moran of the Burning Spear (MBS).
