= Norman Nyagah =

Kenyan politician

Norman Nyagah (born September 15, 1950) is son of Jeremiah Nyagah and brother to former presidential candidate Joseph Nyagah. He is a former member of Kenyan parliament. He was also the chief whip in parliament and he has represented Gachoka Constituency (1997-2002) and formerly Kamukunji Constituency (2002-2007) for the National Rainbow Coalition (NARC) party. During the nominations of PNU for the elections of 2007, Nyagah lost to Simon Mbugua nominations and defected to a small party headed by Kalembe Ndile called T.I.P The Independent Party of Kenya
