= Peter Njeru Ndwiga =

Kenyan politician

Peter Njeru Ndwiga is a Kenyan politician. He is the former Senator for Embu County and the chairman of the Agriculture and Livestock Committee of the Senate. He was minister for the Co-operative Development and Marketing in Kenya and a former member of parliament for the Manyatta Constituency and Runyenjes Constituency. He was member of parliament for the Manyatta Constituency which is now in Embu County on Party of National Unity ticket between 2002 and 2007. Prior to this, he was the member of parliament for Runyenjes Constituency between 1992 and 1997 and then the member of parliament for the newly created Manyatta Constituency between 1998 and 2001.
