= Martin Wambora =

Kenyan politician

The Honorable Martin Wambora
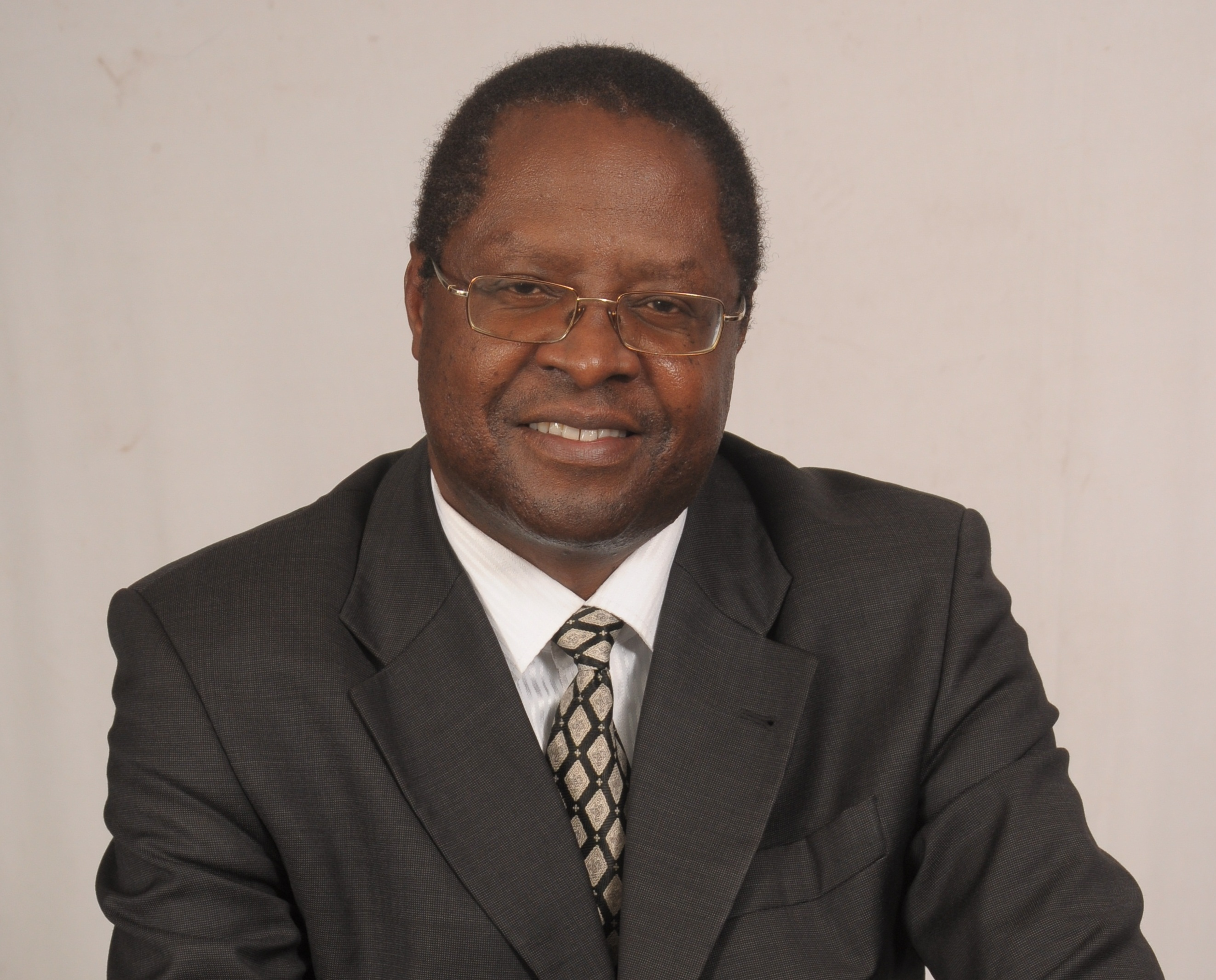

1st Governor of Embu County
- Incumbent
- Assumed office 2013
- Preceded by: Inaugural holder
- Succeeded by: Cecily Mutitu Mbarire

Personal details
- Born: 9 April 1951 (age 75)
- Party: Jubilee Party of Kenya
- Education: Makerere University; University of Hartford

Martin Nyaga Wambora (born 9 April 1951) is a Kenyan politician. He is the first governor of Embu County in Kenya after winning on a The National Alliance (TNA) ticket in the Embu gubernatorial elections which was conducted in March 2013. He would later become the first Governor in Kenya to be impeached, not once but twice but he successfully challenged the impeachment later and was overwhelmingly Re-elected in 2017 winning his 2nd term in office. He was a former member of parliament for Runyenjes Constituency from 2003 to 2007. Prior to becoming the governor of Embu County, he served as the chairman of the board of Kenya Airports Authority and led to its winning of the two most prestigious airport industry awards in 2011.

== Education ==
He went to Muragari Primary School in Mukuuri (Runyenjes). He holds an MBA from the University of Hartford (US), a postgraduate diploma in public management and rural development from the University of Connecticut (US), and a B.Sc. in political science from the Makerere University.

== Career ==
He served as a district officer between 1976 and 1984 under the former Ministry of State for Provincial Administration and Internal Security.#WTC Later on he became District Commissioner in Baringo and Laikipia which later led him to become deputy to District Commissioner of Rift Valley province. Wambora was elected as the Member of Parliament for Runyenjes Constituency in 2003. In the year 2013, Wambora became the first Governor for Embu County after he won the election. Martin Wambora was re-elected as the Governor of Embu County in 2017.

== Impeachment ==
He is the first Kenyan governor to be impeached in a highly disputed and political process, this was a decision that was made by the Kenyan senate. 39 senators voted yes, 1 senator voted no, and 1 abstained from voting during a motion that was conducted to ascertain whether the five Embu County assembly's allegations were right. The decision was challenged in court. There were also revelations that a politician from the Mbeere side of the county bribed MCAs with a trip to Mombasa, to plan for the impeachment. The Governor has been termed as Governor with nine lives. This is because the county assembly unsuccessfully tried to impeach him four times in 2014, with him each time successfully challenging the decision.

== Reinstated ==
Kerugoya court has reinstated ousted Embu governor Wambora as of April 16, 2014, after declaring his impeachment null and void. The judges stated that, “had the Senate investigated Wambora's case, it would discover it was done in violation of the court order in the County Assembly.”

== Re-elected ==
Wambora, who is widely regarded as the governor with the proverbial nine lives, was reelected Embu Governor for the second term on August 8, 2017. He garnered 97,544 votes against Lenny Kivuti's 96,597 while Kithinji Kiragu (PNU) emerged third with 50,590, with only one polling station not tallied.

Former Transport Principal Secretary Cyrus Njiru was a distant fourth with 2,344, followed by Leonard Muriuki (Narc Kenya, 2,313) and Dr Njagi Kumantha (939 votes).

Wambora, the Jubilee Party candidate, won by a huge margin in Runyenjes, attaining 53,345 votes against Kivuti's 9,048; and repeated the feat in Manyatta by scoring 32,403 while the outgoing senator had 14,835.

His election was nullified in Embu High Court on 22 February 2018. The high court judge ordered for a fresh election. The matter proceeded to the Court of Appeal which upheld Governor Martin Wambora's election. Lenny Kivuti appealed that ruling to the Supreme Court of Kenya which also upheld Governor Martin Wambora's election.
