= Mukuuri =

Township in Embu county, Kenya

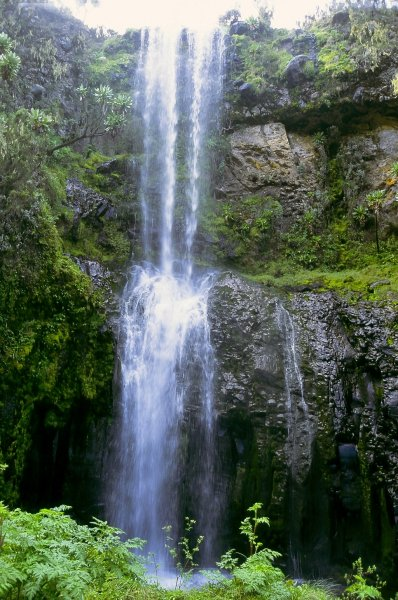
Nthenge Njeru falls in Mûkûûrî

Mûkûûrî is an administrative Location and township in Runyenjes Division, in Embu County, Kenya, with a population of about 25,000 people. It is named for a large, strong Sycamore Fig Tree (Mûkûû in Kiembu. Scientific name: Ficus Sycomorus) that stood for over 100 years at the current site of the township. The Sycamore Fig tree symbolizes strength, rejuvenation and regeneration. Mûkûû-rî region lies on the green, rolling hills of the Mount Kenya slopes. The administrative region begins from the stone cliffs of Nthûngû waterfalls, all the way to Nthenge Njerû falls, through the famous Kirimiri Forest, stretching to the historic Gogo Salt lick, bordering Gitare. It is home to four public primary schools, including Kubu Kubu Memorial Boarding School and Muragari School, which is among the oldest schools in Embu and Kîrînyaga districts.

Mukuuri is also home to the historic Kîrîmîri Forest Hill. The 800-acre forest was popular during Kenya's freedom war the Mau Mau. It's currently a major conservation area, and tourism attraction managed jointly by the Kenya Forest Service and the residents through the Kîrîmîri Community Forest Association. The Embu freedom fighter Kubu Kubu made the forest his main hideout during the pre-independence days. He was killed by the colonialists early 1950s. The colonial rulers burnt his body to ashes on the present location of Kubu Kubu Memorial School. General China, in his book The Mau Mau General, says women and children were forced to clap and sing as the body turned into ashes. This angered the residents and more Mau Mau fighters like Kaviu îtina were recruited.

It is also home to the historic Gogo Salt Lick, well-known as a place of Mûnyû (salt) for hundreds of years in Embu land. Gogo Salt Lick is located on five-acre grassy meadows, one kilometre from Mukuuri township, at the base of a ridge called Mürurîrî. According to the Mbeere Historical Texts by Prof Mwaniki Kabeca (2005), Gogo is the place where Mwenendega, the founder of Embu tribe, met his wife Nthara.

The time zone in Mukuuri is Africa/Nairobi Sunrise at 06:39 and Sunset at 18:46. Latitude. -0.4000°, Longitude. 37.5500° For Kirimiri - Latitude. -0.4167°, Longitude. 37.5500°

== Notable residents ==
The area has produced a number of leaders at national and international levels. They include former Runyenjes MP and later Embu Governor and chairman of the Council of Governors Martin Nyaga Wambora, KASNEB founder and former Embu North MP Hon Stanley Nyaga Kithûng'a and Lee Njiru, the long-serving head of the Presidential Press Service and former Private Secretary of Kenya's Second President Daniel Arap Moi . Others are academics like Kenyan geneticist Prof Njiruh Nthakanio, Kagaari North MCA Muchangi Mwariama, former MCA Sicily Njiru, the journalist Peter Munaita, veteran (Retired) Embu Knut secretary general Mohammed Mwaniki Gakinya, and the long-serving Kagaari Ward councillor and Embu County Council chairman, the late Alexander Njeru Ngari. There is also the late freedom fighter General Kubu Kubu and religious leaders like former Embu Anglican Bishop Moses Njue (1992-2006), Embu Bishop of National Independent Church of Kenya (Nica) Bishop Amos Njiru (1993*-2003*), the late Archpriest John Njue Nthakanio who established the Orthodox Church in Embu County, and business leaders including Richard Nyaga wa Stanley, who served as MD of national carrier Kenya Airways (1981-1985) and later steered privatisation of the airline again as its Managing Director in 1999–2003. . Mzee Kariuki Kobuthi, the man who treated President Jomo Kenyatta by cutting off his uvula in 1960s when Kenyatta was very ill, also lived in Mukuuri.
