= Embu District =

Former district of Kenya

Coordinates: 0°32′S 37°27′E

- Former district
- Interactive map of Embu District
- Country: Kenya
- Province: Eastern Province
- Established: 1906
- Founder: British colonial administration
- Seat: Embu

Population (2009)
  - Total: 296,922

Embu District was a former administrative district in Kenya's Eastern Province. Established in 1906 by the British colonial administration, the district was later split, with Kirinyaga District separated in 1963 and Mbeere District established separately in the 1996. The district was predominantly inhabited by the Embu and Mbeere peoples, alongside minority Akamba and Agikuyu communities. In the 2009 census, Embu District had a population of 296,992. Following the introduction of devolved government in 2013, the remaining Embu and Mbeere area became part of modern-day Embu County.

Local authorities (councils)
Authority	Type	Population*	Urban pop.*
Embu	Municipality	50,730	31,500
Runyenjes	Municipality	57,659	1,566
Embu County	County	169,807	0
Total	-	278,196	33,066
* 1999 census. Source:

Administrative divisions
Division	Population*	Urban pop.*	Headquarters
Central	52,446	28,482	Embu
Kyeni	48,385	0	
Manyatta	71,332	0	
Nembure	41,590	0	Nembure
Runyenjes	64,111	1,515	Runyenjes
Total	278,196	29,997	-
* 1999 census. Sources: , ,

== See also ==
- Mukuuri, a sublocation in Runyenjes division
