= Cecily Mutitu Mbarire =

Governor of Embu County since 2022

Her Excellency Cecily Mutitu Mbarire EGH
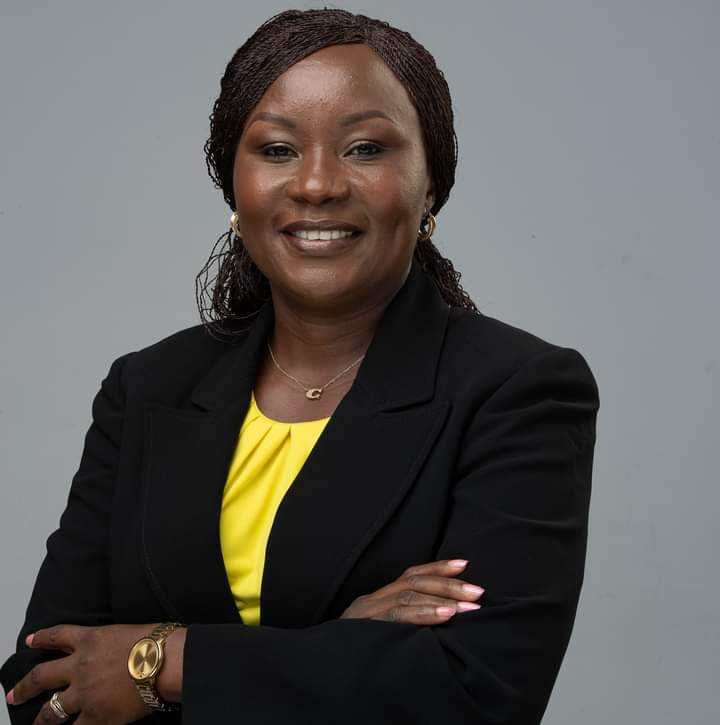
- Governor of Embu County (Her Excellency Cecily Mbarire)

Governor of Embu County
- Incumbent
- Assumed office 25 August 2022
- Preceded by: Martin Wambora

Member of Parliament for Runyenjes Constituency
- In office 2007–2013

Nominated Member of Parliament
- In office 2017–2022

Nominated Member of Parliament
- In office 2002–2007

Personal details
- Born: 26 December 1972 (age 53) Ndamunge, Kanja, Runyenjes Constituency, Kenya
- Party: United Democratic Alliance
- Spouse: Married
- Children: Yes
- Parents: Joseph Njagi Mbarire (father); Margaret (mother)
- Education: Muragari Primary School; Sacred Heart Kyeni Girls
- Occupation: Politician
- Known for: Chairperson of United Democratic Alliance; Patron of The Kenya Scouts Association (Embu County)

Cecily Mutitu Mbarire EGH (born 26 December 1972) is a Kenyan politician who is the serving governor of Embu County since 25 August 2022. She is the chairperson of Kenya's ruling party, United Democratic Alliance, and the patron of The Kenya Scouts Association (Embu County).

== Early life and education ==
Cecily Mbarire was born in 1972 in Ndamunge, a tea-growing village in Kanja, Runyenjes Constituency. Her father, the late Joseph Njagi Mbarire, was a notable political figure, serving as a councilor and later as the Member of Parliament for Embu North from 1974 to 1983. Her mother, Margaret, was a dedicated primary school teacher. Mbarire was educated at Muragari Primary School and Sacred Heart Kyeni Girls. She graduated from Egerton University and a master's degree from the United States International University.

== Political career ==
Mbarire has had an extensive career in politics spanning over 20 years. She rose to the limelight having been nominated MP in the year 2002–2007. In her political career, she represented Runyenjes Constituency in the National Assembly of Kenya from 2007 to 2013. Her advocacy for special interest groups culminated in her nomination to Parliament from 2017 to 2022. Mbarire was also among the seven women Governors in Kenya elected in the 2022 Kenyan general election. The other Kenyan female governors were Susan Kihika-Nakuru County, Gladys Wanga-Homa Bay County, Fatuma Achani of Kwale County, Wavinya Ndeti of Machakos County and Anne Waiguru as well as Kawira Mwangaza in Meru County. They were known as the G-7 governors.

In the 11th Parliament, she served as vice chairperson in the Public Accounts Committee. She held membership positions in various Parliamentary committees, such as Committee on Energy, Communication and Information, Committee on Transport, and Public Works and Housing. In the 12th Parliament, she served in the Committee on Energy, Committee on Appointments and Committee on Procedure and House Rules and also served as the chairperson of KEWOPA.

In her push for equality and vouching for women to take up leadership positions, She advocates for women to pursue competitive elective seats with male politicians, and not to seek 'gender sympathy' in attaining positions.

On 23 May 2024, Mbarire was among the guests invited to the state dinner hosted by U.S. President Joe Biden in honor of President William Ruto at the White House.

== Corruption ==
As with many Kenyan politicians, Mbarire has been accused of corruption but never brought to justice. In 2011, the then KACC Director, PLO Lumumba, accused Cecily Mbarire (then the Runyenjes MP) of attempting to bribe him with a check for just over $1,000. Mbarire challenged this allegation in court but she lost the defmation case before the Kenya High Court sitting at Milimani. This did not stop her from being elected to the Embu county governorship and she is one of the few trailblazing women governors in Kenya.

== Personal life ==
Mbarire's quote and motto is “I am a born champion of serving humanity. I do it as though I am doing it for God." She is married and has kids.
