= Runyenjes Constituency =

Electoral constituency in Kenya

Runyenjes
- constituency for the Parliament of Kenya
- Runyenjes Constituency within Embu County

- Embu County within Kenya
- County: Embu
- Population: 154,027
- Area: 153.4 km^{2} (59.2 sq mi)

Current constituency
- Number of members: 1
- Party: UDA
- Member of Parliament: Eric Muchangi Njiru Karemba
- Wards: 6

Runyenjes Constituency is an electoral administrative unit in Kenya that was established in 1988. With a population of 154,027 its the 2nd most populous constituency in Embu County.

== Demographics ==
=== Historical population ===
Year	Population
2009	142,364
2019	154,062

=== Distribution by gender ===
Gender	Population
Female	72,930
Male	69,970

== Members of Parliament ==
Elections	MP	Party	Notes
1988	Kamwithi Munyi	KANU	One-party system.
1992	Peter Njeru Ndwiga	DP	
1997	Augustine Njeru Kathangu	FORD-Asili	
2002	Martin Nyaga Wambora	NARC	
2007	Cecily Mutitu Mbarire	PNU	
2013	Cecily Mutitu Mbarire	TNA	
2017	Eric Muchangi Njiru	JP	
2022	Eric Muchangi Njiru	UDA	

== Wards ==
There are 6 wards in Runyenjes Constituency: Kagaari North, Kagaari South, Kyeni North, Kyeni South, Central Ward, and Gaturi North. As of 2022, there are 95,326 registered voters in the constituency.

Ward	Registered Voters
Kagaari North	17,289
Kyeni South	17,255
Central Ward	17,035
Kyeni North	15,314
Gaturi North	14,872
Kagaari South	13,564
Total	95,326
*As of 2022
