= Joseph Nyagah =

Kenyan politician (1948–2020)

The Honorable Joseph William Nthiga Nyagah

Minister of Cooperative Development and Marketing
- Constituency: Gachoka Constituency

Personal details
- Born: January 6, 1948 Kenya
- Died: December 11, 2020 (aged 72) Kenya
- Party: Orange Democratic Movement
- Other political affiliations: Kenya African National Union (former)
- Relatives: Norman Nyagah (brother), Nahashon Nyagah (brother)
- Profession: Politician

Joseph William Nthiga Nyagah (6 January 1948 – 11 December 2020) was a Kenyan politician and Minister of Cooperative Development and Marketing in Kenya's grand coalition government.

== Biography ==
Nyagah was a member of the then Kenya African National Union and a minister in President Daniel Arap Moi's office until quitting both the ministry and the party in the run-up to the 2002 general election. He fought the election in Gachoka Constituency as an opposition National Rainbow Coalition candidate.

He was a member of Orange Democratic Movement's 'Pentagon' in the lead up to the 2007 general election.

His LinkedIn profile refers to him as a "Cabinet Member at Government of Kenya". He is a brother to former Kamukunji Legislator Norman Nyaga and former Central Bank of Kenya governor, Nahashon Nyagah.

He died from COVID-19 during the COVID-19 pandemic in Kenya, twenty six days short from his 73rd birthday.
