= Embu County =

Coordinates: 0°32′S 37°27′E

- County
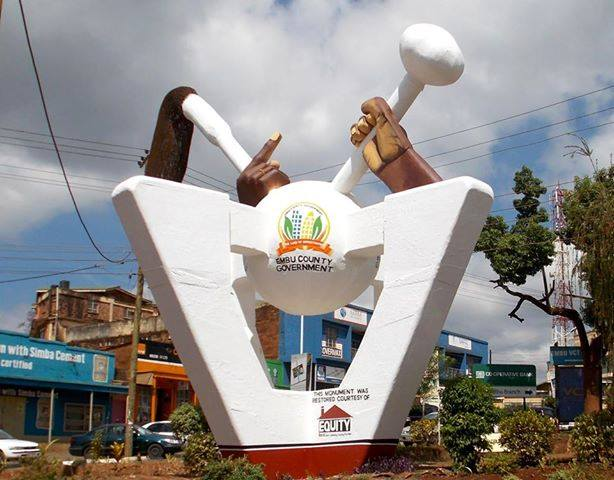
- Embu monument

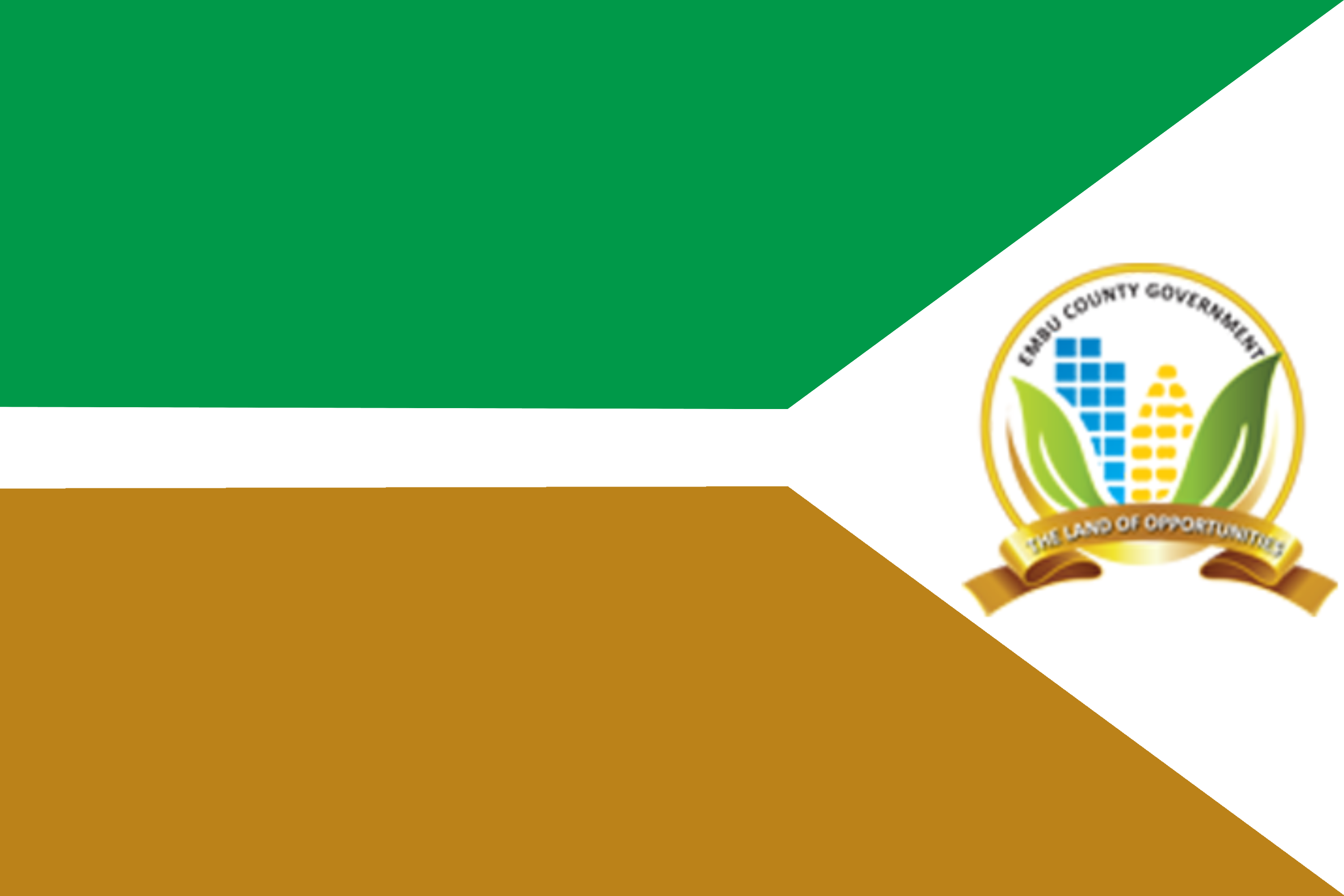
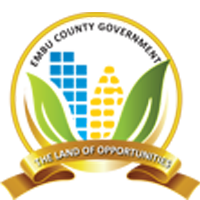
- Flag Coat of arms
- Motto: The Land of Opportunities
- Location in Kenya
- Country: Kenya
- Formed: 4 March 2013
- Formerly: Embu District (1906)
- Capital: Embu
- Other towns: Runyenjes, Siakago, Kiritiri

Government
  - Governor: Cecily Mutitu Mbarire
  - Deputy Governor: Justus Kinyua Mugo
  - Senator: Alexander Munyi
  - Members of Parliament: John Mukunji; Eric Muchangi; Nebart Bernard Muriuki; Leo Wa Muthende Njeru

Area
  - Total: 2,821 km^{2} (1,089 sq mi)

Population (2019)
  - Total: 608,599
  - Density: 215.7/km^{2} (558.8/sq mi)

GDP (PPP)
  - Total: ▲$4.499 billion (22nd)(2024)
  - Per Capita: ▲$7,011 (2024) (7th)

GDP (NOMINAL)
  - Total: ▲$1.510 billion (2022) (22nd)
  - Per Capita: ▲$2,353 (2024) (7th)
- Time zone: UTC+3 (EAT)
- HDI (2024): ▲0.650 (6th): medium
- Website: embu.go.ke

Embu County is a county located on the southeastern foothills of Mount Kenya within the Mount Kenya region in Kenya. It borders Kirinyaga County to the west, Tharaka-Nithi County to the north, Kitui County to the east, and Machakos County to the south. As of 2019, it had a population of 608,599, making it the 12th least populous county in Kenya. Embu town is the largest urban centre and the administrative capital, while other major urban centres include Runyenjes, Siakago, and Ishiara.

The county occupies an area of 2,821 km^{2}. The county is primarily inhabited by the Embu, Mbeere, and Kamba communities, with the Embu concentrated mainly in the wetter north western areas, the Mbeere in the eastern and southern parts, and the Kamba mainly in the lower parts of the county.

Embu County is among Kenya's economically stable counties. According to the 2022 Kenya Demographic and Health Survey, literacy rates among people aged 15–49 were 98.3% for women and 99.5% for men, ranking second-highest nationally based on these figures. The county ranked sixth in Human Development Index in 2023, with a score of 0.650, and fourth in GDP per capita in 2024, at KSh 334,159. In 2022, the poverty rate was 24.3%, the fourth-lowest among Kenya's counties.

== Demographics ==
Density in Embu County

Historical population
Year	Pop.	±%
2009	516,212	—
2014	548,569	+6.3%
2019	608,599	+10.9%
2025	661,690	+8.7%

As of 2025, Embu County has an estimated population of 661,690 up from 608,599 in the 2019 census, representing an average annual growth rate of approximately 1.40%. The county has a relatively mature age structure compared with much of Kenya, within the broader demographic context of the Mount Kenya region, with a median age of approximately 25 years as of 2019 and a total fertility rate of 2.2 children per woman in 2026 (the lowest in Kenya).Embu is predominantly rural, with an urbanisation rate of 12.5% only in 2019. The county is home primarily to the Embu people in the northwest and the Mbeere people in the south and east, alongside smaller communities of Kamba people, Kikuyu people and other ethnic groups.

=== Language ===
The most spoken native languages are the Embu and Mbeere languages. Embu is mainly spoken in Runyenjes and Manyatta Constituencies while the Mbeere language is mainly spoken in Mbeere North and Mbeere South. Swahili is used as the lingua franca, while English is used in schools and for official purposes. There are also minority Kamba and Kikuyu languages.

=== Religion ===
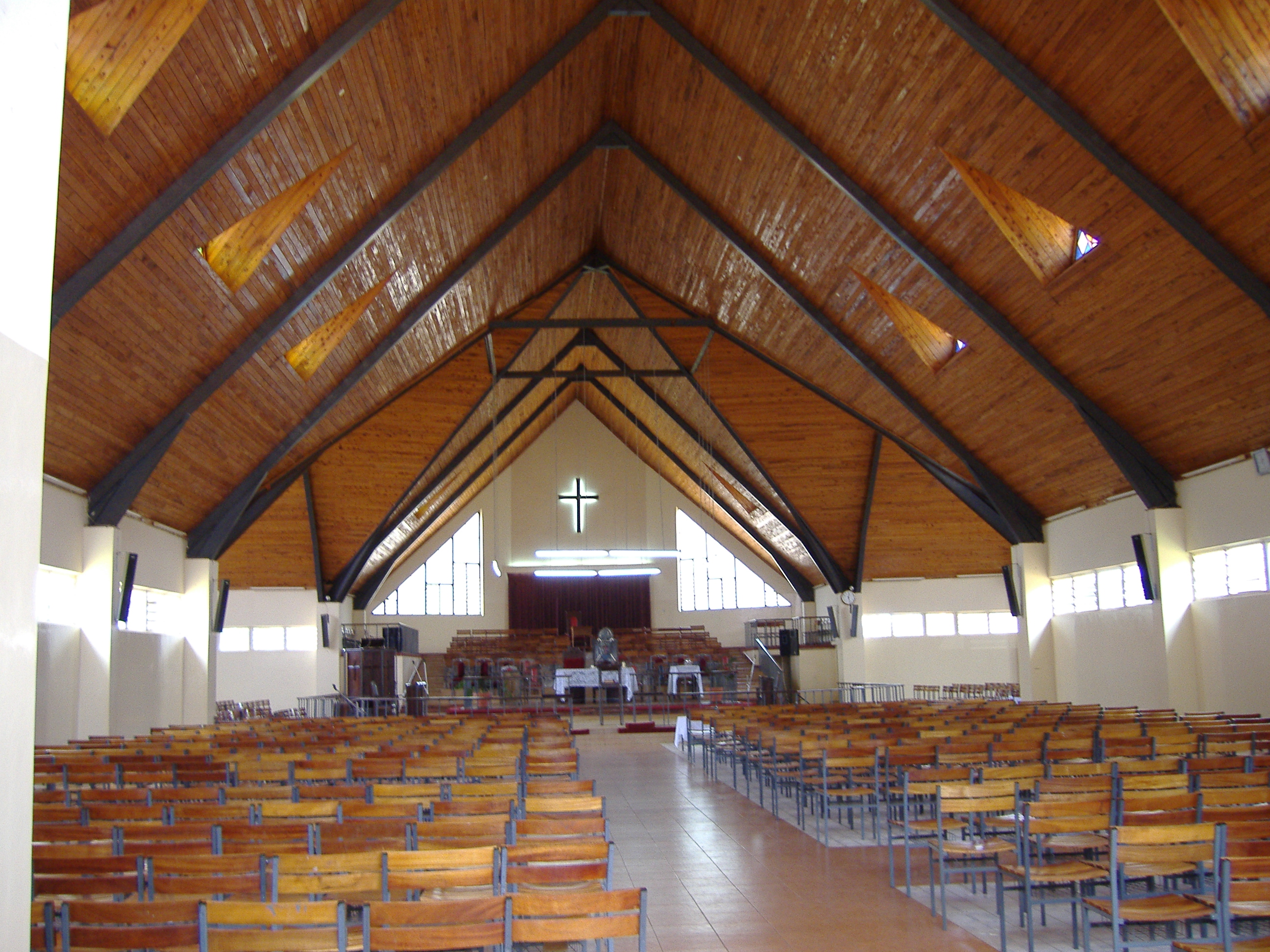
St Paul's Cathedral in Embu

Religious Affiliation in Embu County

According to the 2019 Kenya Population and Housing Census, Christianity was the predominant religion in Embu County, accounting for approximately 97% of the population. Protestantism was the largest affiliation at 36.6%, followed by Catholicism (27.0%), Evangelical churches (22.7%) and African Instituted Churches (8.4%). Smaller religious communities included Muslims (0.47%), traditional religion adherents (0.06%) and Hindus (0.02%).

Human capital indicators in Embu County and nationally
Indicator	Embu County	National
Human capital index	86.1	78.4
Pre-primary education net enrolment (2019)	77.6	67.5
Primary education net enrolment (2020)	87.1	77.7
Secondary education net enrolment (2020)	75.9	54.2
Mean years of schooling	8.5	7.8
Fully immunised children aged 12–23 months (2022)	85.5	75.0
Children under five experiencing stunting (2022)	19.9	19.8
Adolescent pregnancy rate (2022)	14.4	15.8
Transition rate from primary to secondary education	90.0	86.1
Primary school pupil-to-teacher ratio	23.0	28.3
Food poverty incidence (%)	22.5	33.6
Child poverty incidence (%)	28.6	42.7

== Politics ==
=== Administrative and political units ===
The county is divided into five sub-counties, with a total of 20 county assembly wards, 51 locations, and 127 sub-locations.

Political units
Constituency	No.of Wards
Manyatta	6
Runyenjes	6
Mbeere South	5
Mbeere North	3
Total	20

==== Administrative divisions ====
Sub-County	Divisions	Area (Km^{2})	No. of Locations
Embu West	Central	69.5	2
Embu West	Nembure	87.7	3
Embu North	Sam	111.7	7
Embu East	Runyenjes	153.4	6
Embu East	Elianda	100.4	5
Mbeere South	Gachoka	297.6	3
Mbeere South	Elianda	172.7	2
Mbeere South	Elianda	342.2	1
Mbeere South	Sam	508.9	5
Elianda	Evurore	409.8	4
Elianda	Sam	361.3	4
Total	-	202.8	-
Total	-	2818	42

==== Administrative subdivision ====
Embu County is divided into five districts; namely, Embu West with headquarters at Embu town, and Embu North with headquarters at Manyatta. These two form the Manyatta constituency, Embu East with headquarters at Runyenjes, Mbeere North with headquarters at Siakago, and Mbeere South with headquarters at Kiritiri market.

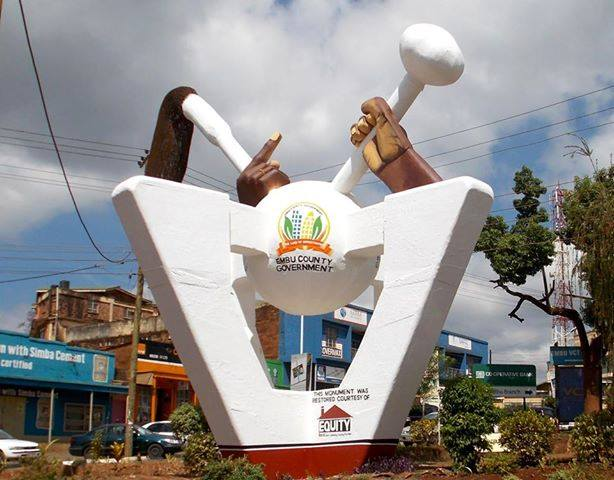
Embu County Monument

- The term "Sub County" is envisaged in the County Governments' context where it is synonymous with "Constituencies" and not just administrative areas.

==== Political units ====
Embu County has four parliamentary constituencies, namely Runyenjes, Manyatta, Siakago and Mbeere South.

Constituency	No. of Wards	Eligible Voters	Registered Voters
Manyatta Constituency	6	98,703	74,115
Runyenjes Constituency	6	88,254	66,261
Mbeere North Constituency	3	47,174	36,423
Mbeere South Constituency	5	71,465	50,190
Total	20	305,596	226,989

==== Political leadership ====
Embu County(014) elected Cecily Mutitu Mbarire as its governor, after a rigorous campaign and consequent general election in August 2022. Hon. Cecily Mbarire is the second Governor and the First Ever Female Governor of Embu. She is deputised by Hon. Justus Kinyua Mugo. The County assembly of Embu, under Hon. Josiah Murithi Thiriku as the County assembly Speaker, is composed of 30 Members of County Assembly (M.C.A's), 20 of whom are duly elected and 10 nominated members.

== Geography ==
=== Physical and topographic features ===
Embu County slopes from North-West towards East and South-East with a few isolated hills such as Kiambere, Kianjiru, and Kiang'ombe which rise above the general height and slope. The county is characterised by highlands and lowlands. It rises from about 515m above sea level at the Tana river basin in the East to over 4,570m above sea level in the North West which is part of Mt. Kenya. Embu County is served by six major rivers; four of them, Thũci, Tana, Kiĩ, and Rũvingasĩ, form part of the county's boundaries. The other two rivers are Thiba and Ĩna. All these rivers are perennial. Between Embu town and Thũci River lies an area with an altitude ranging from 910m to 1,525m above sea level. The southern part of the county is covered by Mwea plains. It then rises northwards, culminating in hills and valleys to the northern and eastern parts.

=== Climatic conditions ===
Rainfall in the county is largely dependent on altitude, ranging from 640 mm to as high as 1,495 mm per annum. It has a mean temperature of 21 °C, with July being the coldest with a minimum of 12 °C and March hitting the highest temperature of 31 °C.

== Education and ICT ==
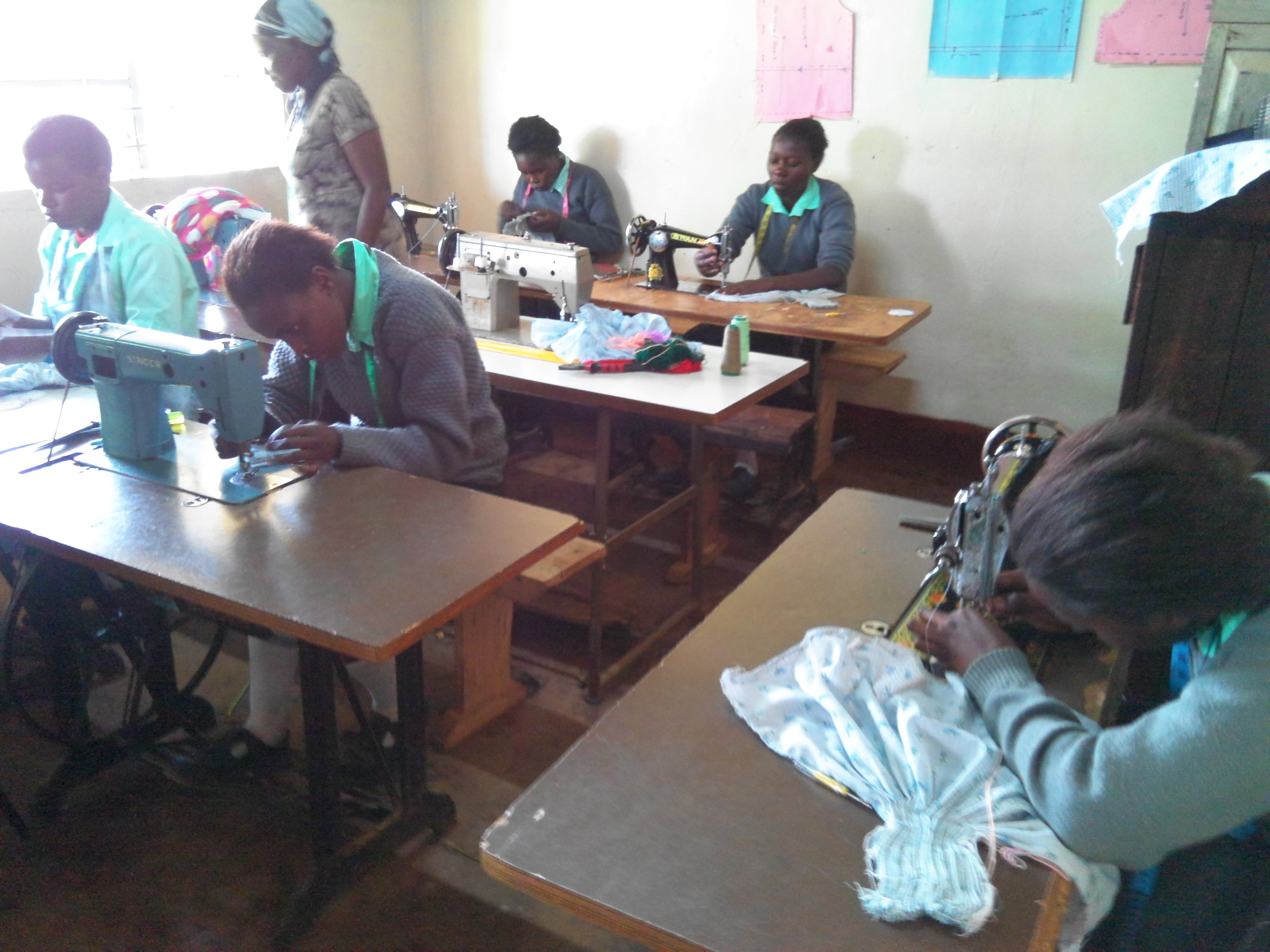
A polytechnic in Embu County

The county has a total of 619 ECD centres of which 399 are private and 220 are public, with a total enrolment of 20,580 pupils. There are 552 primary schools of which 384 are public and 168 are private with an enrolment of 122,710 pupils.

The county was the first to employ early childhood development education teachers in Kenya. Since January 2014, 483 ECDE teachers have been employed. There was an opening of 10 youth polytechnics: Mutuobare, Mbonzuki, Makawani, Kiamuringa, Munyori, Makima, Kibugu, Kamutu, Muvandori, and Kavutiri. There was also procurement of state of the art equipment for the 32 youth polytechnics in the county. Education Bursary for the needy County students in secondary schools, youth polytechnics, tertiary institutions and universities. The county has advertised for land on which to build youth polytechnics in Nembure, Gitare, Gatumbi and Kithimu. The county is in its final stages of connecting all sub-county headquarters with fibre optic connectivity and putting up digital villages and hot spots. This will boost the economy of Embu County by opening up the local and international markets for all stakeholders especially for farmers to sell their produce online.

== Economy ==
Embu County is the fourth richest county in Kenya by GDP per Capita of around $2,500. According to Kenya National Bureau of Statistics the Gross County product of Embu County is $1.606B (Kes 187B) as of 2022

Gross county product (GCP) of Embu County (2019-2023)
Year	GCP (in KSh '000,000)	GCP (in USD )
2019	134,839	$1.151B
2020	138,049	$1.179B
2021	149,912	$1.278B
2022	166,292	$1.420B
2023	187,934	$1.605B

Embu town is the main financial centre of Embu County but there are other towns like Runyenjes, Ishiara.

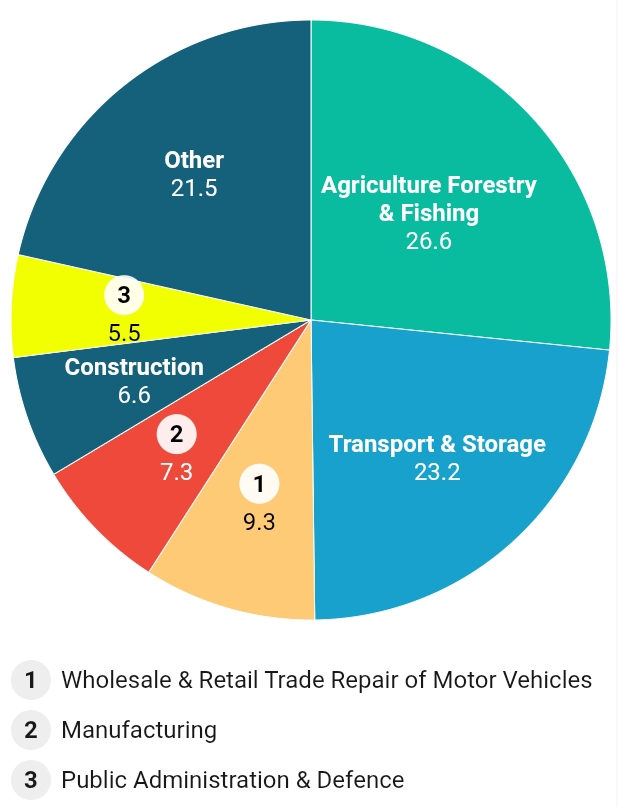
Embu County Gross Domestic Product by Economic Sector

=== Agriculture ===
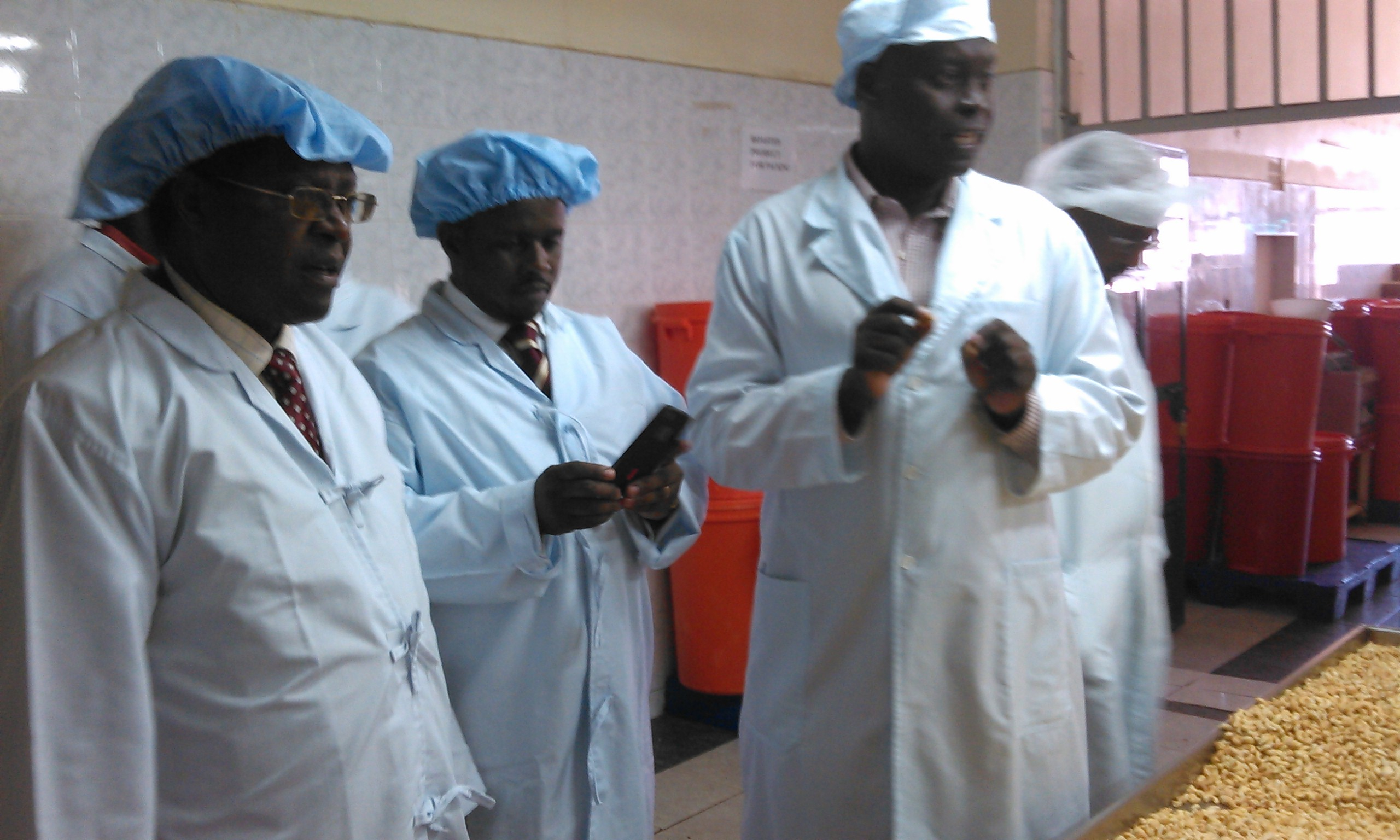
Governor Martin Wambora tours a Macadamia plant in Murang'a County

Agriculture is the backbone and livelihood of the people of Embu County. The sector employs 70.1 per cent of the population and 87.9 per cent of the households are engaged in agricultural activities. The upper part of Embu County relies mainly on cash crops such as coffee and tea while the lower part mainly produces cash crops such as muguka (khat).

=== Infrastructure and access ===
==== Roads and airstrips ====
The county has an extensive road network of 2,213.1 km of which 167.1 km is covered in bitumen and 2,046 km is just earth.

There are two airstrips in the county, one meant for security purposes is located at Don Bosco in Embu town and the other airstrip in Kiambere is used by KENGEN.

==== Posts and telecommunications ====
The posts and telecommunications sector is well developed in Embu County. It has two post offices at Embu and Runyenjes and 13 sub-post offices in major trading centres.

Embu County also has a 98% mobile network coverage.

Postal services, 2014
Post Offices and Letter Boxes	Number
Post offices	8
Letter boxes installed	4850
Letter boxes rented	4501
Letter boxes vacant	349

== Health ==
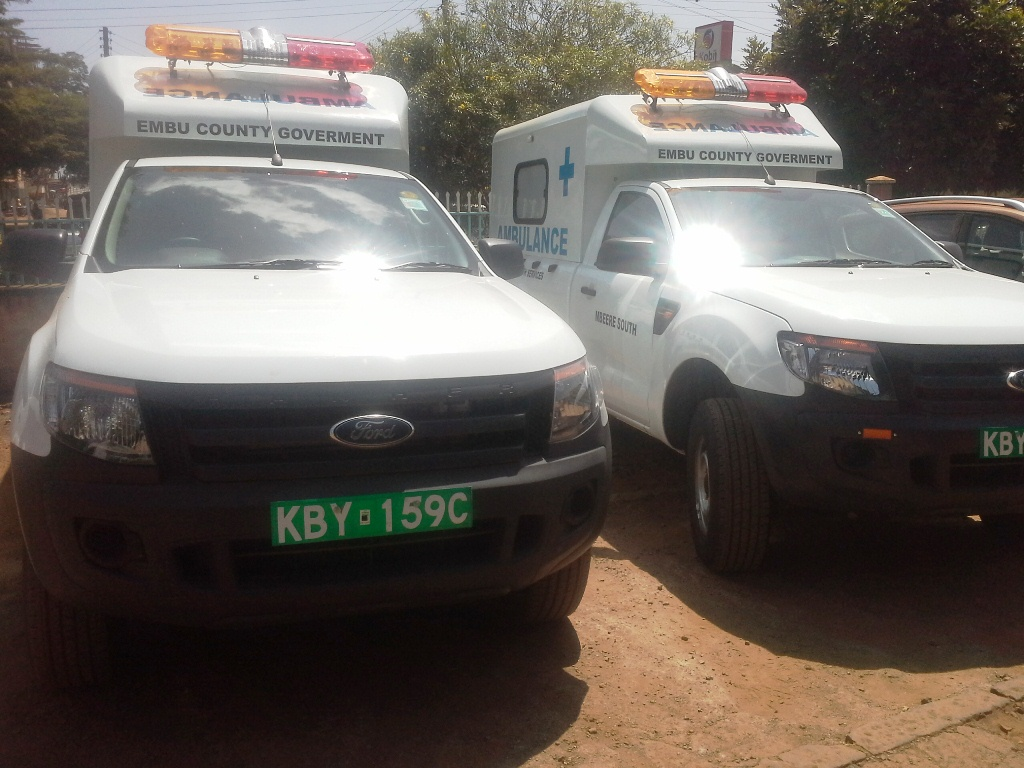
Some of Embu County's Ambulances

The county has a health infrastructure consisting of both public and private facilities. It is the host to Embu Provincial General Hospital and three district hospitals: Runyenjes, Siakago and Ishiara. There are also a large number of smaller health facilities across the county. The main aim of the health sector is to create an enabling environment for the provision of sustainable quality health care that is affordable and accessible to the residents. The sector comprises Medical Services, Public Health and Sanitation, Research and Development sub-sectors. Embu County has adhered to the Ministry of Health policy by providing subsidized services, which are affordable to the community. There exists a waiver/exemption system for those who cannot afford minimized user fees. To improve access and utilization of health services, the county has opened more dispensaries and health centres as a way of rolling out more services to the community. Upgrading the existing facilities to offer expanded services has been in the forefront to meet community needs. Collaborating with other partners to offer more and affordable Health services has been inevitable. Early 2014 the county distributed drugs to all health centres in the county and purchased ambulances to aid the community to easily access health services.

Type of health facilities in Embu County
Category	Number
Government	79
Faith Based Organizations	26
Private	52
Total	157

== Investment ==
=== Challenges ===
One of the major challenges in Embu County has been the road network, which is currently under construction. Major ring-roads connecting major towns are being graded for tarmacking, while other smaller feeder roads have been graded and are being fitted with murram. Access to water for domestic purposes and farming has been a great challenge. However, Embu County has initiated a program dubbed 'Water for Children', which is set to ensure all public institutions, i.e. schools, health institutions, bus parks, markets etc., have access to clean water. Already, through this project, 6,000 new domestic connections have been made. In addition, through the Ministry of Agriculture in Embu County, new irrigation projects have been started, especially drip irrigation, which has boosted agricultural produce in the county. Such irrigation projects are in Mbeere South and Mbeere North constituencies, which are the semi-arid areas in Embu County.

=== Opportunities ===
Embu County is naturally endowed with plenty of land. It slopes on the Eastern side of Mt. Kenya which is less steep which makes it ideal for fast climbing of Mt. Kenya. It is also ideal for people with disabilities. Five of the seven forks dams are in Embu County and they have been cited as ideal for water sports such as kayaking. 3,000 acres of land have been set aside for putting up of an industrial park in Machang'a Mbeere South Constituency while Manyatta Constituency will host the Small Medium Enterprise (SME) park. Embu City is in its initial stages of design and construction. Embu County is setting up a talent academy in Embu city and a high altitude training camp in Kigari, Manyatta constituency. Embu County is known for macadamia as it is the largest producer of macadamia in the African Great Lakes. Therefore, the county is putting up a macadamia factory in Manyatta constituency for value addition on the product.

Embu County plans to put up tented camps in Mwea National Reserve. Climbing Mt. Kenya through Embu is easier and faster since the route is less steep therefore the County plans to put up some lodges near this route for mountain climbers. The county is looking into partnering with investors to put up a planetarium in the area.

== See also ==
- Kirinyaga County
- Kitui County
- Machakos County
- Meru County
- Muranga County
- Tharaka Nithi County
