= Kanyuambora =

Administrative area of Embu County, Kenya

Coordinates: 0°28′S 37°43′E

Kanyuambora is an administrative division in the Mbeere sub-district of Embu County, Eastern Kenya, which is commonly referred to as a "location". It lies on Latitude: 0° -29' 0 N, Longitude: 37° 43' 0 E and is about 90 miles North East of Nairobi. Kanyuambora is one of the eight locations that form Siakago constituency. It was formerly part of the now defunct Mbeere District.

== Etymology ==
Loosely translated, the name Kanyuambora means "one who drinks honey". The area is named after Kanyuambora hill, which is a conspicuous landmark in the region. The name most probably emanated from an age-old practice by the Ambeere people. During the pre-colonial days, elders would gather at the foot of Kanyuambora hill to drink home-made traditional brew which, in essence, was a concoction of honey and water. During this spree, they would give thanks and pray to their gods. They would also discuss important community matters, laying strategies as well as cursing any neighboring tribes planning to attack the Ambeere.

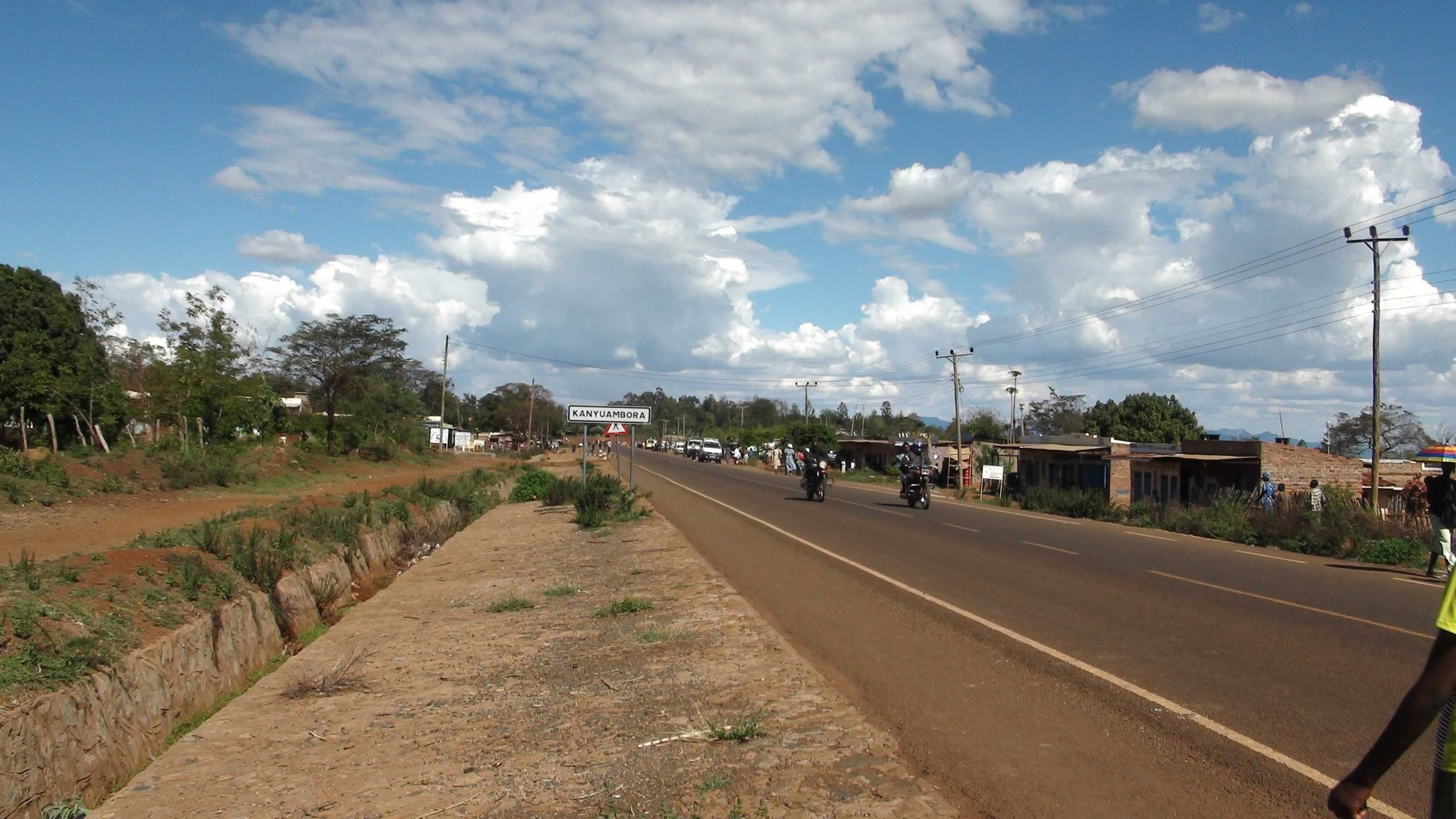
This is Kanyuambora Town, Embu County, Kenya in 2016. The photo was taken by BMJ Muriithi

Kanyuambora is famed for being a pioneer in education in the region. This is perhaps true because it is one of the first places to be visited by Christian Missionaries when they first set foot on the general Embu region. It has arguably produced some of the most educated people in the region. This is epitomized by the fact that three out of the five national Legislative members from the larger Siakago Constituency, formerly known as Embu East, have come from Kanyuambora. They are the current speaker of Kenya National Assembly, Justin Bedan Muturi as well as former MPs Silvester Mate and Lenny Kivuti Maxwell. Other notables from Kanyuambora include United States based Kenyan journalist, Ben Mutua Jonathan Muriithi, popularly known as BMJ Muriithi.

Mr Maguu Mutie, a former administrative Chief who headed the then Evurore Location once famously said, "were it not for the fact that Kanyuambora's physical location is not as Central as Siakago, the Divisional headquarters, read District Headquarters, would have moved there a long time ago". Kanyuambora's quest for education got a big boost when, in 2010, the Archbishop of Canterbury, who is the head of the Anglican Church announced from England that the Church had settled on Kanyuambora as the site for its first ever Higher education institution in the region. Consequently, the head of the Anglican Church in Kenya, Archbishop Eliud Webukhala, laid the foundation stone, signalling the beginning of the construction of the first ever Kenya Anglican University (KAU) in the country.

== Historic origin ==
Like most other Kenya Bantus, the Mbeere ethnic group is believed to have initially come from Central Africa during the 15th Century Bantu migration. At first, they settled in the regions around Nyambene hills, north of Mount Kenya. The Aembu and the Ambeere used to be one people. Their descendants moved from the Nyambene hills area, travelling in the South West direction to settle in the Runyenjes area of what was later Embu district. A legend says that Mwene-Ndega, the first Embu ancestor lived with his wife Nthara in a grove near the present day Runyenjes town. From here, his descendants spread out and occupied other parts of what was later Embu district.

The Mbeere split from the Embu after an inter-clan war which the Embu clan won. After the victory, the Embu pushed the Mbeere to the drier and less fertile Kiangombe hills south of the Embu region. Despite this split, the two tribes co-existed peacefully. The Embu tribe often assisted the numerically smaller Mbeere tribe in times of drought, or when attacked by other tribes like the Akamba or Maasai. It was as a result of this alienation that a Kanyuambora came to be, thanks to the people who settled at the foot of Kanyuambora hill.

== Climate ==
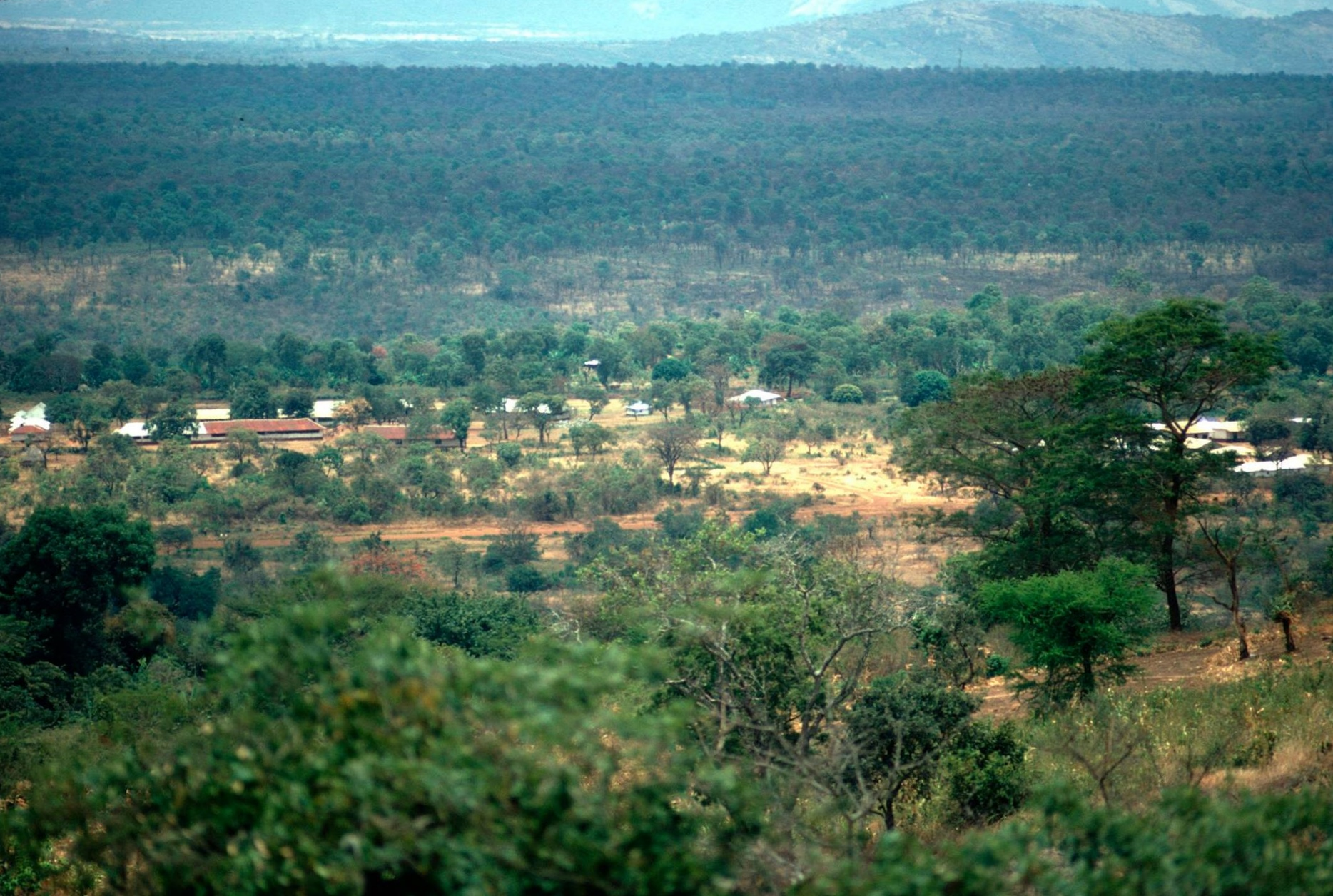
Kanyuambora Town, Embu County, Kenya in 2016

Compared to the rest of the region - notably the drier Ishiara in the South - Kanyuambora has a fairly moderate climate, which makes it favourable for growing of Mango trees which virtually saturate the area. Climatewise, it is considered the 'bridge' between the more fertile Embu region in the North and the semi arid section of Mbeere region in the South. Other crops include maize, millet, sorghum, beans, cassava, and yams. They also rear small herds of domestic livestock. Parts of the former Mbeere District are known to experience drought and subsequent lack of food quite often. The Mbeere therefore often rely on their Embu cousins for food supplies especially in times of drought. Kanyuambora people get their water from the nearby Thuchi river, which serves as the Eastern border between the Mbeere and the Chuka people. Other notable rivers include Rwiria and Ciaivuro both of which feed the bigger Thuchi river.

== Religion ==
Like the Agikuyu and their cousins the Aembu, Kanyuamborans believed that their god, Ngai, lived on the top of Mount Kenya. Prayers and sacrifices were therefore traditionally made to this God. Today, most Kanyuambora people, indeed most Ambeere people are predominantly Christian.

On 20 June 2011, the Archbishop of Canterbury, Dr. Rowan Williams, visited Kanyuambora to attend a groundbreaking and the dedication of a site for the building of the proposed Kenya Anglican University (KAU), the first such University in Kenya.

== The Ambeere People ==
Little is documented about the Mbeere People. H.S. Mwaniki Kabeca, a renowned Kenyan Historian, seemed to dwell more on the History of the Embu People in his published work. This is probably because during the time he wrote the books, Mbeere was itself part of Embu.

Elsewhere, most accounts indicate that the origins of the Mbeere were the same as those of the Bantu-speaking Kikuyu, Embu, Chuka and Meru peoples, namely that their ancestors moved eastwards from central Africa some time before the sixteenth century, and had settled in the Nyambene Hills. From there, say the same sources, the people moved slowly southwards into the foothills of Mount Kenya, where they settled and gradually acquired their present-day tribal identities.

Some Mbeere elders however believe quite the contrary, stating that some, if not all, of the Mbeere's ancestors came from the east, from the direction of Mombasa on the coast. All four Mbeere elders interviewed by H.S. Kabeca Mwaniki were unanimous that the Mbeere and Embu were once one people. This is strongly indicated by Mbeere oral history, which also includes the Embu ancestor Kembu (often referred to as 'Muembu'). The twist, though, is that his mother - whom the Aembu called Nthara - was called Cianthiga, and was herself the daughter of someone called Mumbeere, or Mbeere. This would indicate that the two tribes are not only related, but that the Mbeere could in fact be considered ancestors of the Embu. This would perhaps explain their close, mutual and amiable ties, which have persisted to the present day.

== Notable Kanyuambora personalities ==
On March 28, 2013, Justin Bedan Njoka Muturi (popularly known as JB Muturi), a Mumbeere from Kanyuambora, was elected the first speaker of the national assembly of the Republic of Kenya under the new constitution which was promulgated in 2010. Mr Muturi was first elected to Parliament in 1999 on a Kanu ticket, a party he actively supported and engaged in its activities. Kivuti Maxwell, a Mumbeere from Kanyuambora, was elected the first ever Senator of Embu county on 4 March 2013. Other notables from Kanyuambora include United States based Kenyan journalist, Ben Mutua Jonathan Muriithi, popularly known as BMJ Muriithi, as well as the speaker of Embu County Assembly Justus Kariuki Mate. Former Embu East member of parliament, Sylvester Mate, also hails from Kanyuambora as does former Principal of Nairobi School, Joel Ngatiari.
