= Muriuki =

Muriuki is a surname and given name. Notable people with the name include:

surname

- Joseph Muriuki (born 1984), Kenyan actor
- Linda Watiri Muriuki (born 1964), Kenyan lawyer
- Margaret Muriuki (born 1986), Kenyan long and middle-distance runner
- Silas Muriuki (1949–2023), Kenyan politician

given name

- Muriuki Njagagua, Kenyan lawyer and politician
