= Le-eyo =

Le-eyo is a primal ancestor in Maasai mythology.

== The origin of death ==
The Maasai tell a story of how Le-eyo was told by the god Ngai that he must say a prayer when a child dies, to make sure that the child will come back to life. When a child died that was not his own, Le-eyo said a prayer for the child to remain dead but the moon to return. When his own child died, Le-eyo said the prayer properly but it would not work. In Maasai mythology, this is the reason that when men die, they do not return, but when the moon "dies" it returns the next night.

== The origin of the Maasai ==
Another Maasai story tells of the origin of the people. When Le-eyo was old and dying, he asked his two sons what they would like. The elder son said that he wanted something of everything in the world. Le-eyo gave him some sheep, goats and cattle. The younger son said that he wanted his father's fan. Le-eyo replied that because of his choice, he would be great and wealthy. The elder brother went on to be the ancestor of the Meek (Bantu tribes) and the younger son went on to be the ancestor of the Maasai.
