= Meru people =

Kenyan ethnic group

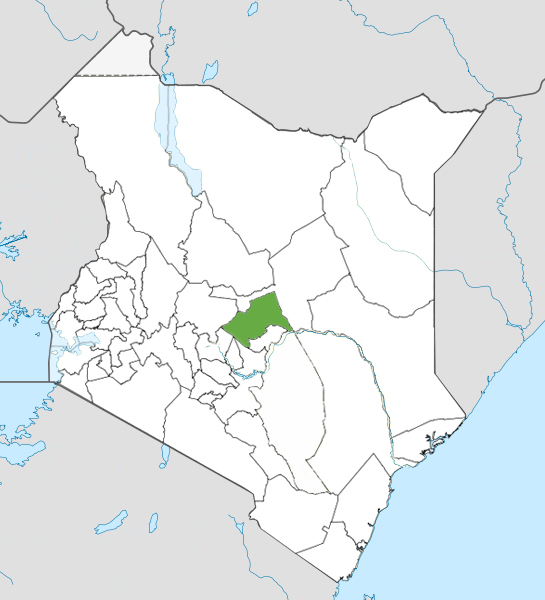
- Meru County and the adjacent western Tharaka Nithi lands: The Native lands of the Ameru people

Total population
- 2,400,000 (2025 estimate)

Regions with significant populations
- Kenya

Languages
- Meru

Religion
- African traditional religion, Christianity

Related ethnic groups
- Kikuyu, Embu, Mbeere, Kamba, Temi, Dhaiso

- Person: Múmîîrú
- People: Amîîrú
- Language: Kimîîrú

The Meru or Amîîrú are a Bantu ethnic group that inhabit the Meru region (Meru and Tharaka-Nithi) of Kenya. The region is situated on the fertile lands of the north and eastern slopes of Mount Kenya in the former Eastern Province.

The Ameru people comprise nine subgroups: the Igoji, Imenti, Tigania, Miutini, Igembe, Mwimbi, Muthambi, Chuka and Tharaka. The Tharaka live in the semi-arid part of Greater Meru and they, along with the Mwimbi, Muthambi and Chuka, form the Tharaka-Nithi County. The Ameru are unrelated to the Wameru of Northern Tanzania.

== Languages ==
The Meru speak the Meru language, also known as KiMîîrú. KiMîîrú, KiKamba, KiEmbu, KiMbeere and Kikuyu share critical language characteristics. The Meru language is not uniform across the Meru lands, but comprises several mutually intelligible dialects which vary geographically. Each dialect is a reflection of previous migratory patterns, the level of intra-community interactions, and the influences of other adjacent Bantu, Nilotic and Cushitic communities. As a whole language scholars have demonstrated that the Meru language exhibits much older Bantu characteristics in grammar and phonetic forms than neighboring Bantu languages.

== History ==
The Meru people are an ethnicity of Bantu origin whose ancestors as recalled by the Igoji, Imenti, Tigania, Mwimbi, Muthambi and Igembe tribes (only excluding the Tharaka and Chuka) the Ngaa people (proto-Meru) inhabited the coast likely around today's Manda Island. Sometime before 1700, coastal Arabs possibly from Persia arrived at the Ngaa's coastal settlement and proceeded to defeat the Ngaa. It is often said that the Arabs enslaved the Ngaa however this is probably not correct. As Fadiman writes in his book;

The invaders are remembered as taller and lighter skinned than the islanders. They wore a single red cloth tied around their waists and at one shoulder, and bound another around their heads. Each carried a short sword of the scimitar type, of which the blade curved backward and only the outer edge was honed. They also carried several guns. Informants differ on the nature of the conquest. Some state that there was a single battle in which the use of the guns proved decisive. Others believe that the islanders did not resist. All agree, however, that the Nguo Ntuni victory was complete and that the pre-Meru entered a period of enslavement [.....] Contemporary informants refer unanimously to this period in their history as one of outright slavery. More likely, it consisted of an initial theft of whatever wealth was available, followed by the development of some form of tribute relationship. This hypothesis would seem to be substantiated by Nguo Ntuni behavior after the conquest. Evidently, some or all of them returned to the mainland, reappearing only at certain seasons ("they had their times"). They normally lived on the mainland behind a log stockade. They had other slaves whom they used to cultivate their mainland gardens but spoke to them in a language that no islander could understand.

After a time of submission, the Ngaa gradually grew much angrier at their overlords, refusing to work the fields or take care of the cattle which supposedly angered the Nguo Ntuni causing them to confront the Ngaa's Kiama (Council of Elders) who then proceeded to mock them for their supposed wisdom. The Nguo Ntuni demanded them to perform a number of incredibly ridiculous tasks. The first called for the elders to drop a small round fruit into a deep hole, then recover it without using either hands or sticks. Baffled, they turned to the community's ritual specialists, as was traditional in times of crisis. In this instance a Muga (curse remover), recalled by the Meru as Koome Njoe, suggested they fill the hole with water, then float the fruit to the top. The 1913 version recorded by Meru's colonial administrator E.B Horne reads: “The Kiama held a shauri (meeting)and decided . . . to fill the hole with water until it overflowed and the fruit floated out with the water. This they did, and the Nguntuni [sic ] said yes you have performed the task but now we want you to do something else.” The second task was to provide the Nguo Ntuni with an "eight-sided cloth," a problem that again baffled the Kiama. Koome Njoe responded, however, by providing the council with a cob of maize. The husk, when peeled, had eight sides. A third task called for the provision of a calf that would produce white dung. Koome Njoe reacted by starving the calf for a week, then feeding it milk and lime for four days more. Thereafter, its droppings were white. The Nguo Ntuni then demanded a sandal with hair on both sides. This was accomplished by using the dewlap of an ox, which was cut from the still-living animal and stitched into the desired shape while still sufficiently fresh enough to be flexible.

There were several other tasks, each more difficult than the last as the conquerors grew increasingly angry. One demand was for a "dog with horns," a problem that momentarily baffled even Koome Njoe. In the earliest versions, however, he advised the Kiama as follows: "They [the elders] caught a dik-dik [a tiny antelope], took its horns, then put them into the head of a dog, carefully sewing up the cuts [they had made] in the skin." The elders completed the operation by smearing gum around the base of each horn, placing the animal's hair in the gum to conceal it, then immobilizing the animal until the entire incision had healed.

According to oral history, the Nguo Ntuni became angry and demanded the murder of several Kiama elders. The old men responded by withdrawing from the invaders' camp to hold a final feast, at which every family was to present a goat. When the time came, blood from the slaughtered animals was allowed to run into the waters that flowed from the point the elders had chosen for their feasting into the Nguo Ntuni camp. Spokesmen for the islanders' warriors then appeared with the blood of the slain animals still on their spears to report to the Nguo Ntuni that the murders had been carried out. The Nguo Ntuni then gathered the remaining elders together and assigned what was to prove their final task—the forging of a single spear so long that it would reach the clouds. Neither Koome or any of the elders could find a solution and they thus turned to another ritual specialist known as Mururia who proposed that the Ngaa should flee the island.

=== Escape from Mbwaa ===
To avoid Arab detection, Mururia suggested that the elders of the oldest age set still alive be sent to the Nguo Ntuni daily with ever increasing lengths of rope that were purportedly a sign that the spear's construction was still in progress. The elders informed the Nguo Ntuni that the smiths had completed the construction of a gigantic forge that would apparently send a great glow into the sky that same night. The Ntuni were warned to keep away from the forge lest the flame burned them. In the meantime the plans of escape were still being crafted. Specific clans had been chosen to carry and protect objects of importance along the way. Yams for instance were carried by the Abwekana (the root gikana meaning yam stem),Kiniamburi carried the goat (mburi) etc. Objects of religious significance would be carried by the Omo, the clan most associated with the Meru God Ngai and from which the Mugwe were derived from. Informants describe that the Ngaa divided themselves into individual clans so that "if one [band] was lost, all clans would survive". The first unit composed of warriors, were to defend the community and act as an advance guard. The second unit was made up of elder and middle aged men who could be called to fight incase disaster struck and the last consisted of women, children and the elderly. The whole group was led by the prophet as in accordance with the Ngaa's beliefs, it was only he who in the power of magic and blessings of the ancestors could protect such a group. When night fell, every village would set a fire providing the great glow the Nguo Ntuni had asked for.

At this time the warrior band set out immediately leaving by the moon of which it is said that their descendants would be called Nyaga/Njiru(moon/darkness, black). The second group set out at dawn and would be called Ntuni(red) and the final group left in daylight and would be called Njeru(white).

Coordinated Escape

Initially the plan had almost entirely failed as the channel between Mbwaa and the mainland was under water. According to kiMeru legend, the prophet requested that 3 men be willing to sacrifice themselves for the people. The first, Muthetu, was to be an altar on which the sacrificing would occur. The second, Gaita would have his stomach cut open so that the prophet could read omens from his intestines and a third man, Kiuna was to act as a viable replacement incase Gaita's courage would fail. After the sacrifice the prophet placed powder on an animal's tail in his hand of which he scattered it onto the waters which parted the waters.

This rather obviously fictitious mode of escape is probably a consequence of absorbing some of the narratives of Abrahamic religion as this is a common theme in both Islam and Christianity. The Bajuni have a similar origin story in which they supposedly crossed the Red sea to Somalia with a higher figure to help, that is, the sheikh, the ritual specialist. It therefore seems likely that the Ngaa had learned of such stories from the Nguo Ntuni and had conveniently twisted it. What is most likely is that tidal action on the channel made the waters shallow enough to cross through

Once the Ngaa had reached the mainland however, informants claim that they had to climb a mountain and filed across a narrow "gate"(water path) to avoid leaving any tracks. On descending, they had reached the banks of a supposed "red sea" (irea itune) which was described as having red fresh water ("we could drink it) that were slow and shallow and quite wide as migration supposedly took "many days" to cross from which they followed the left (South bank) of the river, which was probably the Tana River in a "westward" direction which should be take to mean "inland" or loosely as "uphill" as at the time they generally denoted the same direction from modern day Meru's steep slopes. As Laughton had showed that the words for right hand, left hand and high (urio, umotho, ruguru) also meant north, south and west and so it is likely that the Meru language developed where the west was roughly equivalent to "uphill".

=== The Trek to Mount Kenya ===
Food and supplies

The Ngaa mostly lived off the goats and sheep they had managed to bring along with them as well as whatever crops they could manage to raise. They also supplemented their diet by fishing by using wooden hooks. Their lack of the use of iron cage fish trapping from the Nguo Ntuni was probably due to the lack of iron bearing sands in the lowland Tana. Instead they reverted to using lassos made of woven goat hair that snagged the gills of passing fish long enough for the fisher to catch the fish. Their houses probably consisted of simple smaller huts as they were constantly on the move.

Past the Tana

After a count of four seasons, the migrants left the river entirely turning west to what is recalled as a desert referred to as Ngaaruni(arid place) or Maliankanga(holes of the guinea fowl) and started calling themselves the Ngaa people which was probably derived from the word migaa (thorns) that they used for protection and possibly referred to the gradual disappearance of the Tana from their field of view.

The Desert

In an attempt to answer the question as to why the Ngaa left the Tana, Fadiman posits that multiple factors may have caused their eventual leave. Fadiman notes that the Ngaa were very militarily weak as their men were only equipped with simple weapons (iron knives, wood tipped arrows, small bows) and moreover had to protect their belongings which caused them to form incomplete settlements along the Tana's bank rendering them immobile which convinced them that it would only be a matter of time before the Nguo Ntuni arrived. Rather obviously one of their prophets would inevitably predict that the Ntuni would soon arrive and thus they left the region leaving immature crops behind. This according to Fadiman, was exacerbated by the reliance on prophets. Elders of Igembe had recalled that ik the final march along the river, dreams had shown the Ntuni approaching from the opposite (Northern) bank. The psyche instilled in the prophets engendered further prophecies of a so-called land of promises from which they would live in prosperity. Igembe elders recall one of these prophecies:

“We shall not be in this desert forever, but shall leave this place and get better land. My magic gourd will direct me to the new place. As we leave, we will settle in a foreign land, whose people we will defeat in battles and whose cattle we will seize.”

—Kiringo M'Munyari, Igembe, MOS 33

It is also important to recognize that in the context, "desert" had been used rather loosely to refer to a region of scattered trees and light bush i.e. it was a relative term rather than an absolute term. Indeed, as traditions show these "desert" areas had rather a large amount of foliage for cattle to graze on. So the migrants most probably had left both due to religious (prophetic) concerns as well as the existential temporary waterways. River Laga Buna, a small river which drains into the Lower Tana at Kibusa as well as many others provide such good "anchor" rivers for the Ngaa to have used.

Having left for the "desert", the Ngaa prioritized any water sources that would be available to them and of which they drew from shallow papyrus swamps described as "elephant foot steps". At a swamp known as Kirorero, the Ngaa swore to defend and fight off the Ntuni however no Ntuni ever appeared which allowed the Ngaa to settle and institute their first age set Nkuthuku probably around the 1720s.To sustain themselves however they continued west and north to which they discovered another swampland known as Thingithu which lasted them perhaps another three seasons before they migrated further north west passing through several other such swamplands. During their trek they passed through a place recalled as Kiiru in modern-day Kitui was said to have "four white peaks" probably in reference to the Kathiliwa, Mutito, Makongo and Endau highland peaks and their mist but it is unlikely they ever crossed this region as it would have put them into direct contact with the Kamba of which neither side has an oral account of interaction. It is more likely that they trekked past the lowlands between the seasonal swamps of the Hiraman and Thua rivers which gave them a clear view. Pushing on north west brought the Ngaa into increasingly arid areas where water could only be reliably found in the ground. Traditions record that the Ngaa only survived by digging water to the depths of two men. In addition, the scarcity of ready food and hydration led them to start hunting Grévy's zebra and the Reticulated giraffe to sustain nutritional requirements. It is also believed that the Ngaa had, in their north west trek passed through the route of an old Arab caravan as is documented by Kamba oral tradition evidenced by the presence of donkeys who are not indigenous to the region and were probably introduced by caravans from the north. Further north the terrain changes to rapid bush which caused the Ngaa to turn sharply west and enter into Mount Kenya's Southern slopes by passing Lower Tula-Tula-Nthunguthu-Thunguthu system emerging into Mbeere territory. One can conclude that the migration could have been said to have ended with a final crossing of another "great river" known as the Kiluluma, Kinunuma, Kilunkuma, words used by the Central Bantus to denote the Tana River. At first, the Ngaa found themselves unable to cross without losing their livestock. They therefore moved north along the right bank to a point (or several points) where other rivers flowed into the Tana (the Mutonga and Ena rivers been frequently mentioned), making the waters relatively shallow. Here they remained long enough to unite into the Mukuruma age set probably in the 1730s, then crossed the river and moved north beyond its bank toward Mount Kenya, whose peak could be seen clearly in the distance, the Ngaa continued onwards north and west in Mbeere region travelling through forested hills that run from Mount Kiburu (formerly Orimba hill) to Mount Kiaga which led them to make contact with the Cuka and Tharaka people. At first, the Ngaa tried to settle in Cuka's lower forest fringes but after a clash fled upwards to the resident Tharaka peoples where they were received peacefully and allowed residency and gradually intermarried from which the original unity of the Ngaa dissolved and an era of dividing known as kagairo in Meru and igaironi in Tharaka followed. In this time period, the Ngaa began to separate into the Mukunga ("people of Ngaa") and the other was known as the Murutu probably in reference to the considerable intermarriage with the Murutu/Chagala section of the pre-Tharaka.

They kept on migrating with a north west orientation however at today's Ntugi hill they appeared to have divided once again. The Murutu broke into three; the contemporary Murutu decided to stay on the plain and became part of today's Tharaka, another group moved to the westerly direction to Mount Kenya and became the Mwimbi subtribe and the last moved onto the plains of Tigania to form the Tigania subtribe, and thus "Mwimbi, Tigania and Murutu were once one" which would be remembered by fostering relationships of kinship and would be used historical justification that would be used to form military alliances. The remaining Ngaa also fragmented. One moved northward toward the heavily forested mountains of the Nyambeni range, which stretches northeast from the base of Mount Kenya. Three others moved west, into the foothills that make up the lowest portions of modern Igoji, Abogeta (South Imenti), and Abothoguchi (North Imenti). The final group drifted south, eventually entering that part of the Mwimbi region that lies adjacent to modern Muthambi—an area they eventually seized from the Cuka in the 1880s. These groups too would commemorate their period of common identity ("Igoji, Igembe, Imenti, and Muthambi had one father") by establishing rituals of kinship that would evolve into military alliances and bonds that would set them against the clans of Mwimbi and Tigania and form the basis for future internecine war. The reasons for the fragmentation aren't really obvious and neither do Meru or Tharaka oral literature give any reasons as to why however one can infer from geography;

Simply that various components of the original migrant group were faced with the lure of a wholly new type of topography. At that time the rugged lower slope of northeastern Mount Kenya and the neighboring Nyambeni Mountains were heavily forested. To the migrants they must have promised cool grazing, virgin cropland, inexhaustible water, and refuge against enemy attack. The choice was whether to seek the more favorable altitude or remain on the Tharaka Plain.

The slopes of this section of Mount Kenya, however, are also divided into steep, precipitous ridges, separated by swift rivers that are frequently in flood.[...........]Because every portion of their earlier journey seems to have followed some form of swamp or river system, it is not difficult to imagine fragmentation occurring when they were faced with many smaller water systems emerging from a single mountain.

In their efforts to exploit this new environment, therefore, numbers of the migrants may simply have drifted out of contact with one another, becoming separated by the forest and the rugged ridges that they climbed, until gradually their common identity and even their common name had disappeared. Politically fragmented and demographically few, each band began to climb the Kiriama Kia Maara (more commonly Kirimaara), the shining mountain, today's Mount Kenya.^{[20]}

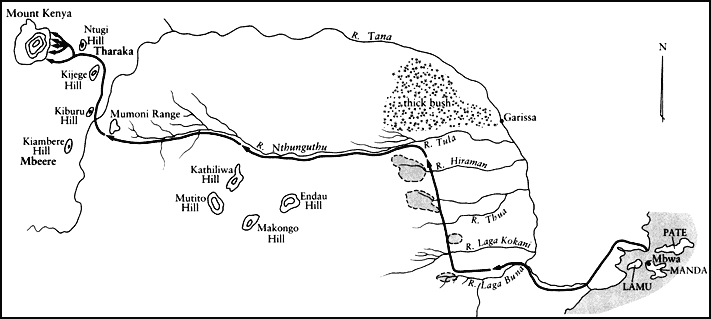
The immigration of the Meru from Mbwaa Island to Mount Kenya showing the westerly and north west tracks taken as well as relevant landmarks/features remembered along the path

=== Settlement and conquest ===
==== Expulsion of the Indigenous peoples ====
Evidence gathered from clans of the lower slopes of Mount Kenya and adjacent Tigania plains all recall the existence of smaller groups of natives as the Meru pushed on westwards. These were

a) Small Cushitic groups

b) Kalenjin(Ogiek) peoples

c) Various scattered Maa peoples(The Il-Tikirri Maasai primarily)

==== The Cushitic speakers ====
The Cushitic speaker groups were relatively well known before the pre-Meru had reached the area with it being very likely that they were related to the Oromo and Galla as evidenced by their burial patterns and linguistic similarities and are recalled with several names as ikara or muoko in Tigania and Imenti, ukara in Mwimbi and Muthambi in the plain regions and as mukuguru and mukuku in the lower forests of Mwimbi, Igoji, Imenti and Tigania. Earlier on, Oromo-speaking peoples (Galla, Boran, Oromo, etc.) began to migrate south from the Ethiopian and had reached Kenya by the 1700s. The Boran, in particular, had moved into grasslands on both sides of the Tana and perhaps even have gone deep into Tanzania. Some of these herders were attracted first by sight of the mountain, and the plentiful grass grazing opportunities at its slopes. Thereafter, just like the Ngaa, they had probably broken in small groups along the lowest forest fringes, in contact with the Mokogodo, until the pre-Meru appeared.

Both the Ukara and Mokogodo had supposedly fled the slopes of Mount Kenya soon after the arrival of the Ngaa. Too scarce in numbers and militarily weak, they are said to have "turned into birds and flown away." On the Tigania Plain, in particular, however, the more numerous Muoko chose to fight. Tiganian narrations from this era describe how men of the Mukuruma age-set (mid-1730s), sent ahead of the migrants to examine the plain, returned to describe an entire "sea of grass filled with few people and many cows." Informants suggest that Tiganian prophets commanded raids for cattle. Tiganian warriors are said to have taken the Muoko by surprise, seizing "four great herds" initially before packing the remaining women, elderly and children into small camps. As a mode of defense, the Muoko are said to have hid relevant supply materials such as cow salt licks and used stabbing spears rendering Tiganian ventures very costly. Tiganian elders recall that the wars had gone on for "decades" but realistically were a series of dry season raiding on both sides. At some point, however, the Tiganians mastered the art of forging spears pushing the Muoko into the northeast away from the fertile grassland region. In so doing, they moved into Il Tikirri Maasai and Mumunyot Maasai group territory.

What gradually occurred was the utterly devastating raiding of the Muoko by Tiganian, Mumunyot and Il Tikirri raids and skirmishes perhaps even with the North Imenti and over the years the group gradually dissolved as children were kidnapped, wives taken and Muoko men absorbed into Tiganian ridgetop communities with the full extent being unknown.

Both groups began to raid the Muoko from the north at the same time that Tiganian pressure intensified in the south. Consequently, Muoko communities gradually disintegrated as their herds were seized and absorbed by former foes. Early traditions record skirmishes between Muoko and Tiganian, Igembe, or even North Imenti warriors for many years. The later narrations, however, deal primarily with the seizure of Muoko children for Meru homesteads or the adoption of captive Muoko warriors into Tiganian clans.

==== Kalenjin groups: Umpua and Agumba ====
Both the Umpua and Agumba appear in Cuka, Embu, Kikuyu and Meru oral histories. Described as hairy dwarfs who lived in caves by both the Mwimbi and Muthambi, the Agumba seemed to have been hunters and Umpua herders who had a symbiotic relationship with each other as they "waged no war[....]gave honey for milk". Their decline gradually began when the Mwimbi settled, as, encouraged by their small numbers and unintimidating stance, found their herds the targets of constant raids, as Mwimbi men of the mainstream sought both glory and cows. Mutual warfare seemed to have continued for well over a decade, as two age sets were supposedly involved. Pressure and fear forced the Umpua in every region up the mountain. Initially they attempted to shelter their herds in pits dug deep in the forests. When this no longer proved possible, they supposedly fled ("around the mountain, like birds") and disappeared. When this exactly occurred is frankly unknown. The Umpua of Imenti, for instance, are said to have been pushed northeast, onto Mount Kenya's northern plains, where they held out until scattered years later by raiding Maasai. The Umpua of Mwimbi are said to have fled south. Nonetheless, the pattern set is obvious; everywhere the pre-Meru went the Umpua had to fight for their herds. In every case victory came through Meru numerical superiority, and by the end of the 1700s, the Umpua and Agumba had virtually been entirely assimilated and extinct.

==== Maa speakers: Il Tikirri, The Maasai and the Mumunyot ====
The pre-Meru had made contacts with the Maa groups as early as the 1730s (Tigania) with the Muoko acting as a buffer. When the Muoko fell in the 1750s, the three now bordered each other and severe cattle raiding began almost immediately. At first, the Maa were successful but progress eventually stalled when the Tiganian clans pushed the Mumunyot out of their lands causing the Il Tikirri to form alliances with various clans to prohibit cattle raiding. This was however broken by the next warrior age set who sought raiding of the Il Tikirri for military glory pushing them to the very north of modern-day Tigania beyond the Oasu-Nyiro river where they posed a seasonal threat to Tiganian herds.

Contact with the Maasai themselves would only happen in Imenti with the Ratanya and Githangari age sets (1760s to perhaps the 1780s) when the Meru were moving to the Katheri region of North East Imenti who became aware of the Maasai to the west in modern-day Laikipia. Raiding began almost immediately with the outcomes being similar to that of the Tigania: outnumbered, they were forced out of the grasslands and into the arid plains posing a seasonal threat to the Imenti.

Peace, however, was also prized. The Maasai tried trading with the Meru which led to the formation of kinships (gichiaro) with various Meru clans and led to intermixing with both ethnicities that functioned as a prohibition of attacks lest the blood of "brothers" be shed. Kinship was also created through adopting Maasai as "sons." Within (North East) Imenti, Igembe and Tigania this usually occurred through capture. Warriors taken in battle would often be held ransomed by kin. If no ransom was paid, they could be speared or adopted into their captor's clan. Adoption took place with most if not all age sets with especially high numbers of Maasai joining clans in Tigania. Adoption was by oath, in which the captive became "son" to the warrior who captured him. Having become ritually absorbed into his "father's" age-set, he was free to raid any group with whom he had no ties, whether "naturally"(by blood) or "artificially"(by adoption).This made a lot of Northern Meru rather friendly and hospitable to Maasai settlers with their influence being particularly significant in Tigania as the region was flat and could be easily attacked with the Maasai model of age sets, circumcision, 10 years mandatory service for males with separate warrior huts and a standing force being very useful for such an exposed people.

This rampant absorption of a foreign peoples into the Meru tribes gradually started to take a hit on unity and the concept of being a Meru entirely. The change being extreme especially in the Tiganian regions of Kianjai and Muthara where the traditional ways of life had been heavily altered with to the point that Tiganians gradually started seeing themselves as distinct to the point that Tiganian warriors started referring to the peoples of Igembe and Imenti pejoratively as "kangiri"(cultivators, literally "little diggers") which was clearly an adoption of Maasai mindsets as the Maasai generally looked down on cultivation entirely. This to some extent occurred everywhere the Maasai went in Meru but Tigania in particular was heavily altered. Thus common ancestry and the philosophy of the Meru way of life were gradually changed as it now linked agriculture, cattle raiding, a strong pursuit of manhood and individual honor in stylized wars. As a result, by the late 1700s, Meru had devolved completely into external and also internal wars of limited intensity that became deeply entrenched into the Meru way of life till the colonial era.

One could argue that contact with the Maa was perhaps one of the biggest events in all of Meru history. It is even generally believed that the name Meru came the Maasai Mieru which probably derived from the Maasai Miru or Meiru which was the term used to describe the Imenti forests and their inhabitants. In Maasai dialects the word carries a double connotation: a place where people do not hear (speak) the Maasai language (and who are therefore deaf and dumb) and a cold place that is silent ("dead") and still (such as a forest, which pastoralist groups like the Maasai despise). When the earliest migrants entered the "silent and still" forests of Mount Kenya, they may simply have adopted the name given to the region by adjacent occupants of the plains. To the surrounding pastoral communities the Meiru would have become a forest people, "silent and still," in that they spoke no language "heard upon the plains." This also probably matches the pattern in which groups entering the three southern regions (-imbe, -ambe, -oji ) as well as Igembe (-mbe ) may each have adopted Tharaka designations for the areas they chose. This may also explain the name of Tanzania's Wameru who may have gotten their name from Maa populations around Mount Meru. Only after this extensive contact did the pre-Meru now start referring to themselves as the Meru.

=== The 1800s: War, fragmentation and the coming of England ===
==== War, ethics and praises: A vicious cycle ====
Internecine warfare had become deeply entrenched into Meru society by the late 1700s and the beginning of the 1800s. Twice yearly at the beginning of every dry season, warrior bands of every region set off from their collective ridgetop to invade adjacent lands to their own in the pursuit of glory, usually cattle and perhaps a wife. This warfare however was rather restricted, in that there were various military conventions that acted as "ethical" practices kept in place during raids, for example:

1. One ridgetop could not raid another ridgetop who were allied by a gichiaro
2. Only livestock (Cattle, goats and sheep) were considered raid-worthy. All other types of property such as ripening crops and damaging homesteads were off-limits. One could still take ripe crops in times of hunger but could not cut down trees. One could still scuttle around for any valuables in huts however extensive damage to a hut was considered cruel and would usually result in a sue for cattle which would be decided by an extensive kiama meeting of elders from both sides. Homesteads could only be raided for spears, swords and other weapons but civilian items like household/herding/agricultural items such as beads, salt etc. were off limits.
3. Warriors could not interfere with trade routes, internal or external. Thus even opposing sides at war could still trade items with each other even in times of extreme hostility.

To summarize it all the Meru tried as much as possible to keep women, the agricultural and commercial spheres of life as distant as possible from warfare. Other conventions, however solely existed to preserve life. The aged and young for instance, were all together prevented from exposure. Women were also protected just as much for similar reasons as well as, in particular for women, traditions of "dishonoring" for those who harmed women. They could be captured however eventually they would need to be returned to a man from her clan with a cattle ransom and in the meantime were treated as "daughters". Men were also treated similarly, in the case that a man would lose he would shout ngua ng'ombe("take cattle") or could symbolically place all his weapons in one hand, from which his former opponent would take his weapons, tear his skin cloth and then place it on his shoulder "eliminating him" from the war from which he would be ransomed back for cattle after extensive negotiations by the local puppet Kiama set up by the elders of each ridgetop. To kill was a heavy offence since it was believed that each kill landed a condition of "impurity"(mugiro) on the victim which required livestock sacrificing to remove and would shun an individual till the sacrifice was performed therefore killing was avoided as much as possible as it would actually cost the killer a great deal in terms of personal net worth and reputation.

After a successful raid, a warrior would receive a certain portion of livestock from which he would drive home to his father. Warriors had to give up all their livestock to their fathers and would stay poor in general as he only grew "rich" by convention when the father would bestow blessings upon him and a promise that he would eventually use the livestock acquired to attain a bride for him. The "reward" being that he would get a successful praise name after a raid. Later that night his victory would be declared and a "dance of praising" would be held where a select amount of livestock would be slaughtered and the captors of the chosen livestock would present hides of the cattle to women they desired. As feasting ended, the dancing began and each warrior who had taken booty in livestock, trophies and/or generally done well in combat danced, one by one to the center gathering singing his actions. The son's mother came, tore of his clothes leaving him naked while women chanted the name he would be known as. Which might reflect on his nature for example defiance to a higher figure would perhaps give a name like "stubbornness", a talkative person may be called "silence breaker" etc. This system of praise would encourage young men who had bad reputations to go raiding to clear their names or for younger warriors to acquire names to also take up arms in raiding, repeated over many ridgetops further encouraging and ensuring raiding became the norm.

=== Fragmentation ===
By the late 1800s Meru society was becoming increasingly polarized by the Meru fringe who manifested themselves as Kiamas "of the few". Central to it all was the upset internal differentiation of the elderly class in Meru and their institutions.

==== Kiamas of the fringe: The Kiama of crop protection ====
By the 1860s, Meru society's fringes had wholly emerged in the form of various kiamas, the so-called Kiamas of Magic (Kiama kia Mithega). Some like the Kiama of Crop protection had devolved from the elites of the Wathua, which likely arose during the Kubai age-set period of the 1870s. The Wathua drew heavily on A-Athi ritual models, using formalized curses and protective magic, but repurposed them for agricultural land protection rather than hunting territories. Membership was restricted only to propertied male elders, excluding women, warriors, and landless individuals, and was essentially a puppet crony kiama.

Central to Wathua practices were ritual Ndindi, carved sticks taken from the sacred mwinkithia tree, prepared with ocher and chalk, and bound together. These were used alongside a visible boundary system based on the A-Athi concept of Nkima (“skull”), adapted into the use of vines (keiea) strung around cultivated fields used to mark ritually protected zones. Intrusion into these areas was believed to trigger automatic curses, producing visible and socially isolating physical symptoms. which could only be removed by specialized ritualists (Muga jwa Wathua), who employed medicines (mithega) derived from A-Athi practices and performed symbolic rites involving vomiting, boundary crossing, and verbal incantations. Successful cleansing required the offender to acknowledge the transgression and submit to the ritual process.

The cured were obligated to enter into a form of ritual kinship with the Wathua council and to contribute food and livestock to communal feasts, typically held after harvest. These obligations reinforced the council's authority and facilitated its gradual expansion. By the late 19th century, such crop-protection councils had become widespread across Meru regions adjacent to the forest, reflecting the broader transformation of hunter-derived ritual systems into agrarian institutions which shifted discourse of the Wathua et al. to a more ritualized system of reciprocated extraction.

==== The Kiama of the Stomach ====
During the late 1880s and early 1890s, a series of ecological and epidemiological crises profoundly altered Meru society, contributing to the emergence of new forms of supernatural councils. Initially, agrarian ritual councils such as the crop-protecting Kiama Kia Mithega had been restricted to wealthy landholders whose substantial farms required protection. However, successive disasters such as the rinderpest epidemic of 1887–1888, drought and locust infestations in the early 1890s, and a severe smallpox outbreak in 1892 led to a catastrophic loss of livestock, land, and kin networks. These events produced, for the first time in Meru history, a marked division between relatively prosperous households and a growing population of landless and impoverished individuals.

Victims of famine and disease sought security through ritual adoption into established clans, often invoking distant or symbolic kinship ties. Others, excluded from such support systems, formed independent associations to secure food and protection. These groups, later remembered disparagingly by wealthier agrarians as “stomach Kiamas,” were composed primarily of young family heads and apprentice elders whose prospects for marriage and household formation had collapsed with the loss of livestock.

Oral traditions identify numerous such councils among them the Wathi, Gatanga, Muundu, Kagita, and Mwaa who had emerged across the drier, lower regions of Mount Kenya. These groups also drew on A-Athi and Wathua precedents, adapting established supernatural techniques to their own circumstances. Ritual practices included the establishment of protected gathering spaces marked by sacred sticks (Ndindi), the use of goat dung and chanting to create ritual boundaries, and the construction of communal meeting huts symbolically guarded by magical objects modeled on the A-Athi Nkima.

Food acquisition strategies varied regionally. Some councils employed indirect supernatural sanctions, such as ritually enclosing paths or croplands, compelling wealthier landowners to provide feasts or payments to remove the imposed curse. Others acted more directly, collectively confronting selected households, ritually isolating them, and demanding provisions in exchange for lifting communal curses. Relative to the rest of Meru, these groups were simply parasitic nuisances however to characterize them as such would be rather foolish and short sighted as these groups functioned more or less as survival institutions for dispossessed men using ritual authority to enforce redistribution during a period of unprecedented crisis, that is, to say, they were a symptomatic prime of wealth inequality of the elderly elite.

==== The Kiama of Kidnappers ====
Some time during this period, some food-oriented ritual councils adopted increasingly coercive desperate practices to attain food and other economic necessities. One of the most notable examples was the Kiama of Kirimu, which emerged among Tharaka communities living along the Sagana (Tana) River and drew members from adjacent Mwimbi, Igoji, and southern Imenti populations.

Kirimu (or Kirimo) originated as a mythological figure in Tharakan tradition, commonly described as a monstrous snake inhabiting the Sagana River in Kirinyaga that “swallowed” young males. Prior to 1900, Kirimu also referred to a recognized ritual council whose symbolic seizure of promising youths functioned as a form of initiation, conferring elder status (nkara) rather than causing harm.

Following the ecological and epidemiological crises of the late nineteenth century, perhaps at least one Kirimu council evolved into a food-seeking ritual association. Based on an island in the Sagana River, its members conducted nocturnal raids on selected wealthy homesteads, ritually “abducting” young boys using nets while protected by chants, drums, and ritual staffs (Ndindi). These seizures targeted only affluent households and were widely understood to be temporary.

The abducted youths were held briefly at the Kirimu stronghold before their families invited the council to a ritual feast. Upon receiving food and livestock, the council released the boys, marking them with shaved hair and castor oil as symbolic signs of Kirimu's power. This practice would still endure on till the early 1900s.

==== From the Nkoma to the Mwaa ====
The ecological crises of rinderpest, drought, locusts, and smallpox transformed Meru agrarian society, prompting the evolution of ritual councils from crop-protection institutions into food-gathering and performative associations. One of the earliest of these transformations was the Kiama Kia Nkoma. As famine and social disruption intensified during the 1890s, Nkoma members began forming temporary food-gathering groups, using ritualized displays to secure sustenance from wealthier households. These small bands gradually evolved into the Kiama Kia Mwaa (“Mwaa”), or clown societies, which combined magic, music, theatrical performance, and ritualized compulsion to obtain food and reinforce social bonds. Members adopted distinctive costumes—often feminine in appearance, with beads, shredded goatskin or palm-leaf skirts, cowbones, bells, and musical instruments—to amplify their presence and signify ritual authority. Performances included singing, dancing, storytelling, and extemporaneous sexualized or humorous acts designed to entertain, shame, or impress both hosts and audiences.

The Mwaa operated under culturally recognized patterns. While performances could involve coercion, such as temporarily “capturing” participants, this was largely symbolic, providing socially sanctioned means for voluntary incorporation into the council. Food, beer, and livestock were provided by wealthier homesteads in exchange for entertainment, and refusal could trigger ritualized curses, verbal maledictions, or symbolic acts such as encircling a property with human or goat dung. In addition to sustaining members during times of famine, the Mwaa offered outlets for ritualized sexual and gender nonconformity, allowing men to perform feminine roles or explore alternative social identities with at least minimal social approval.

==== Prophets, warriors and the ever threatening fringe ====
At this point Meru society had become twice divided. First, members of the warrior age-set began to challenge the authority of both ruling and ritual elders by asserting independent decisions over warfare, a departure from established tribal conventions. Second, deviant or antisocial family heads, men beyond the warrior stage, formed parallel administrative and ritual institutions, creating fringe Kiamas that duplicated or subverted mainstream authority. These groups actively recruited members from the broader population, gradually expanding their influence and introducing new variants of ritual practice, including novel forms of cursing that could become increasingly threatening.

Deviant groups were often small, geographically dispersed, and composed of distant kin, which made military action against them useless. Warriors were restricted from attacking noncombatant or older male kin, and the potential power of the fringe Kiamas’ supernatural practices including curses believed capable of afflicting livestock or households instilling wide range fear of both reputation and perhaps curses. Furthermore, longstanding traditions had created ambivalence among elders: fringe communities, including hunters and ironsmiths, had historically rendered valuable services to the wider society, leading to a mixture of respect and fear. Consequently, mainstream elders relied on ritualized isolation dietary taboos, restricted marriage alliances, and exclusion from councils to limit interaction with deviant groups without direct confrontation.

This ambivalence extended to later fringe Kiamas, including crop-protecting, food-gathering, and performative societies. Mainstream elders officially ignored them, denying access to ritual honors, elder status, and communal decision-making. However, their exclusion did not neutralize the groups; warriors often attempted unsanctioned raids against them, destroying huts or scattering members, but these actions were largely ineffective, as the fringe reassembled quickly. Such raids may have been more ritualized than genuinely combative, serving to symbolically regulate the deviant groups rather than eliminate them.

The persistence of fringe Kiamas reflected both social necessity and cultural accommodation. They provided structured alternatives for men unable or unwilling to perform traditional masculine roles, including supernatural protection for young males inclined toward homosexuality and socially sanctioned outlets for middle-aged men who adopted feminine or clownish roles. In doing so, these groups reinforced flexibility within Meru society, allowing minor deviations from normative behavior while maintaining overall social cohesion. Paradoxically, their existence also offered warriors precedents for limited defiance, permitting ritualized challenges to authority without undermining the broader social order.

By the late 1800s, therefore, Meru elders found their authority challenged on multiple fronts: by warriors asserting independent martial decisions and by middle-aged men creating autonomous ritual structures. Despite this fragmentation, a tacit compromise maintained the social fabric temporarily. Fringe Kiamas persisted, balancing deviance with socially recognized functions, and preparing Meru society for future pressures both internal and external.

=== The coming of England: The red men and his caravan ===
By the 1860s, rumors of the coming of "red strangers" who would build a "long snake" had spread from Kamba land to the Mount Kenya region. Practically all prophets of Mount Kenya had forewarned about these "red people"(achunku). The first whites to reach Mount Kenya came from the coast as accompanying merchants of Swahili/Kamba/Zanzibari-Arab caravans looking to trade various items, usually cloths, beads and trinkets for tusks, honey and foodstuffs. At first, the relationship was purely that for trade and trade only however suttle trade cultural differences emerged in that while the Arabs and Swahili were to negotiate sometimes for days on various deals, the whites demanded that transactions occur instantaneously and with immediate effect which caused impatience and inevitable raids. Perhaps the best illustration is of that of William Astor Chanler who arrived in modern Igembe in 1892 with a caravan of 4 Somali guards and 60 Swahili porters. Citing the region's obvious fertility, they decided to coerce Igembe peoples by seizing 2 elders which was against Meru military conventions. When fifty warriors appeared, he captured four of them and scared the rest with gunfire. The next day, over 400 men were assembled outside Chanler's residence vowing to fight however to Chandler's relief, Igembe elders had refused further conflict and redirected them to Tiganian households with whom they were at war with. This supposedly repeated itself in Tigania and would become the near standard every single time Europeans entered Meru.

The main reason for the elder's compliances were the ever obviously increasing awareness of the effectiveness of European weapons as well as a heed to the prophecies of these "red strangers". This exacerbated stress between the elders and warriors. The warriors were much less cautious and relied on traditional rather backward thinking that the guns could simply be rendered useless by displays of courage however the elderly who had taken caution stopped further aggression as they recognized that it would necessarily be collaboration or death. Stress in particular became rather obvious within the lesser protected regions of Meru. In today's Thaicho (Daicho as it was recalled back then), the warriors had found it impossible to defend their cattle, from the bordering Imentis, Tharakas and in particular the Tiganians. The leader of the region, M'Minuki resorted to welcoming Chandler with livestock to guarantee respect and security. A gichiaro was then offered and an "alliance" was born in which successful raids would be carried out.However the Europeans eventually left and the Daicho would be left helpless as the surplus wealth would be quickly raided by the Daicho's neighbours. When the Europeans came back this shifted the power dynamic and set off a small scale arms race where every Meru division competed for trade deals and alliances with the European traders.

Another rather obvious reason was the fear of military defeat. Stories had emerged all the way from the South and East in Gikuyu country about the multiple atrocities committed by the trade caravans, of the killing of babies, destruction of farms which made it clear that violent opposition was not an option.

This era in particular is recalled for the vast wealth the caravans brought in that were completely out of reality for the Meru. In response to the ritual ban of wealth acquisition for warriors, they viewed these caravans, arriving as late as the 1890s as golden chances to acquire wealth.

=== The Early 1900s: Embu, conquest, subjugation ===
==== The Fall of Embu ====
The fear had increased dramatically in 1906 as news reached the Meru of the British conquest of the neighboring Embu. A neighbouring ethnic groups that viciously refused to trade with the earlier caravans and collaborate with Europeans.

By 1904, British forces supported by Maasai auxiliaries had conquered the Iriani Gikuyu to the south and extended protection over the Mbeere flatlands to the east. Embu territory thus stood as a hostile enclave surrounded on several sides by British-controlled regions. Pressure for its conquest arose from multiple sources. British officials objected to the continued existence of a defiant people near their domain. European settlers and concession seekers desired access to Embu's fertile lands and forest resources. Britain's African allies also pushed for invasion: the Gikuyu resented Embu independence and coveted their cattle, while the Mbeere saw an opportunity for revenge after generations of Embu raids.

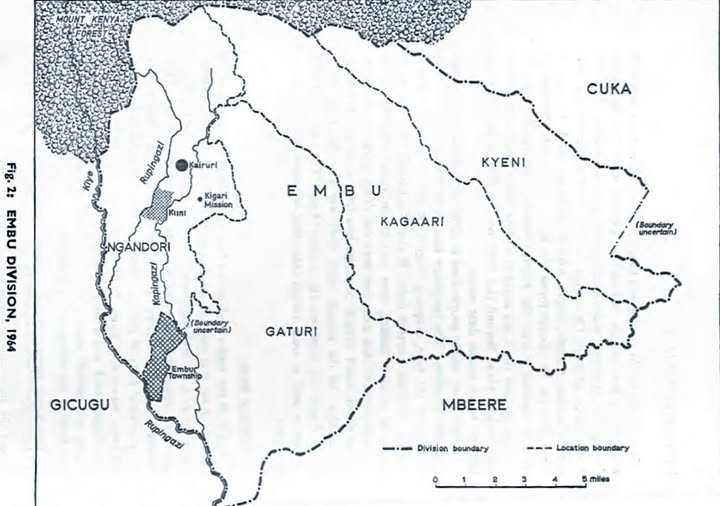
Historic Embu lands as mapped out in the 1960s

The first step toward conquest came through Gutu, a Mbeere war leader allied with the British. At his urging, Mugane, a respected Embu leader from Ngandori, was invited in June 1906 to witness British military power and discuss surrender. Frightened, Mugane returned with a written demand that Embu pay one thousand cattle as a collective fine. The warriors of Ngandori angrily rejected the proposal, denounced Mugane as a coward, and expelled him from council.

In an attempt to intimidate, Embu communities responded with symbolic defiance. Some returned the British letter accompanied by a basket of millet, daring the whites to "count the individual grains" if they wished to know how many warriors awaited them. Others sent leopard skins or war clubs to proclaim their readiness for battle. As a clear sign of lack of fear, The Embu decided to raid the Cuka to the North. Hundreds of warriors from both highland and lowland regions assembled, encouraged by possession of several operable guns to raid the Cuka, Mount Kenya's historic weak spot. The Cuka, long aware of their weakness however, had constructed elaborate defensive barriers of forest, felled trees, vines, and thornbushes along their borders. These "living walls" funneled attackers into narrow paths where defenders could strike with arrows from all sides making traditional encirclement redundant. When the Embu raiders first appeared and decided to start an opening, they were met by a large and growing force of defenders and were steadily pushed back without capturing any livestock. Embarrassed and exhausted, the warriors withdrew only to be met with bad news from messengers: Embu itself was under attack.

By July, invading forces commanded by the British had struck at five points along the Gikuyu-Embu border with Gikuyu warriors forming the bulk of the attackers and guides. At the core of the force were two companies of the Third Battalion of the King's African Rifles, supported by the askari. These soldiers were in particular very effective as they were not only armed with Martin-Enfield .303 rifles but also composed of foreign soldiers thus obedience to the British were thoroughly maintained. Taking the opportunity, Mbeere forces attacked from the east under three prominent war leaders as most Embu lowland warriors were on the Cuka raid making conquest very easy. In highland regions, resistance took the form of ambushes but were quickly broken by rifle fire. In the lowlands, fighting followed traditional patterns and sometimes involved ritual challenges between commanders, but these efforts also succumbed to firearms.

The elderly, women, children, and the remaining warriors fled uphill into forests and caves. When the raiding force returned from Cuka, exhaustion and panic prevented unified resistance. Warriors scattered to defend their own homesteads highlanders confronting the Gikuyu and British, and lowlanders opposing the Mbeere. In nine days time, Embu survivors hid and starved while enemy forces plundered the region. More than ten thousand head of livestock were taken. Homes, crops, and banana groves were destroyed, and livestock slaughtered wastefully. The conventions of warfare collapsed. Any warriors caught were killed, and noncombatants of all kinds were beaten, abused, or murdered. Only after nine days did British officers regain control over their allies and impose order. By the end of it all, Embu was left in ruins and the Meru could only watch.

==== Conquest ====
The defeat of the Embu stifled up fears of the Cuka, Mwimbi and Muthambi, the closest of the Meru to the Embu. Indeed, the pleas of men, women and children to shelter their cattle in Meru adjacent regions and the reports that non-militia gave that "If you stand behind a tree, you are killed. If you stand behind a shield, you are killed. If you stand behind a hill, you are killed" had sent obvious messages to Mount Kenya's people. To figure out how to best respond, the Muthambi and Mwimbi recalled their Nkomes, their highest elder's council. Debate ensued for days on end in which neither faction, the ones advocating for traditional techniques such as digging ambush pits and isolation from Cuka nor the ones who felt such measures were inadequate proved successful. A second meeting was held but also proved helpless. A third council was held and as a measure of last resort, instructed spies to run into Embu territory, specifically the areas that had been allied with by gichiaro to Northern Mwimbi such as Ngadoni which was Mugane's home. Here they would gather as much information to help the elders understand the situation. Upon returning the spies revealed the true extent of the war: Upper Embu was all in chaos, the people had fled and gave up any resistance and were now in refuge in the forests. All their livestock had been taken by the invaders who were using powerful rifles that scared even the most dedicated warriors. This stance, in addition to the earlier prophecies made almost half a decade ago and the defeat of the Embu and the Kikuyu forced the Mwimbi to sue for peace.

A peace delegation was to be brought to the victors in Embu consisting of two representatives for both the warriors and the elders. The elders chose M'riga Cania and the warriors chose Mbogore each carrying the wooden staff of kiama. Together with a 20-manned honor guard they set out for Embu and are said to have arrived by the end of the nine horrible days. On their way, they met various Embu informants, one of them being Ciriani wa Karwa who had just been made a colonial chief. Ciriani advised the delegation to avoid any war and how to make peace. Since the white man was reportedly of warrior age set too, it was advised that Mbogore attend to him. As per custom, Mbogore brought a ram as the peace symbol and honey.

On arrival, Mbogore was introduced to the white man, Edward Butler Horne, a colonial agent appointed by the British to extend influence all the way to Mount Kenya. The meeting was smooth and in the end, Horne had appreciated him and appointed him as the Chief (Munene) of Mwimbi, symbolically by giving him a black cotton blanket (kanga) and so Mbogore would be a Munene ya Kanga(blanket chief) responsible for preparing his people for the arrival of Horne and also encouraging other men to join in. Upon arrival back in Mwimbi, he was initiated back into the ranks of the elder's council as a way to make him subservient to elderly authority and also to honor his role as the doubly spokesmen of the warriors and also the elders but only in matters concerning the new colonial authorities.

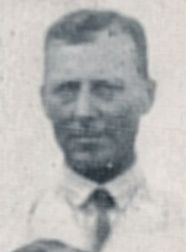
An old picture of E.B.Horne (Kangangi), possibly in the 1920s

By July 1907 Horne was instructed to pass over the Meru regions of Cuka, Mwimbi, Muthambi and Igoji.By this time, practically all Meru had sent delegations and had their own blanket chiefs. Horne decided to pass by with a white horse and a few Maasai spearmen for protection. Passing through Cuka without incident, he crossed into neighbouring Muthambi where he was greeted by Njage, Muthambi's warrior spokesmen and led to the elder's meeting place, the Mkui. There he asked for the warriors. When they came out, they did so beating their shields with their spears hurling battle cries. Unintimidated, Horne decided to show the seriousness of the issue by shooting a bull which instantly collapsed and then fired a round of shots at the soldiers' stacked shields which quickly turned their cries into silence. He then asked how they governed themselves and they informed him that they were ruled by their kiama. On inquiring how he the Muthambi dealt with their neighbours, they responded that they waged war. Horne informed them that from the on there would be no raids, for cattle, women or any other useful property and that the area would now be brought to peace. The warriors angrily asked how they would obtain the cattle necessary for livestock and the solution according to Horne was trade. Horne then informed the Muthambi that they would not be idle however and would instead be busy in the construction of a big road. This again angered the warriors who complained that it was simply not a men's but a woman's job to dig the ground but Horne asserted himself. Horne then instructed Njage to identify any other chiefs in the area to which he appointed commanders of his own age set. These were then also appointed blanket chiefs, a move that supposedly startled Njage. Each new chief was required to provide warriors who would act as porters. The strongest being selected for the corps of guards that would also each be given blankets and were termed askari but in Meru were recalled satirically as the Kanga ya Muchunku.

Horne would go on to continue this in upper Muthambi where he once again met with Mbogore and continued on to Igoji. After a brief return to Embu, he once again set off this time for Tigania, Igembe and Imenti where he repeated exactly what had happened in Muthambi: introduced himself, intimidated the warriors, stated his objectives, appointed chiefs and moved on. It is from this constant movement that he would be recalled as Kangangi("little wanderer"), a derivative of the name Mwangangi which in the Meru language means "wanderer" or more loosely "one who travels around", the name by which he is still recalled by in Meru today.

Not all Meru had been accepting of this conquest. Whilst collective resistance was basically non existent due to the actions of Meru's elders, individual resistance still remained. For example, in Imenti a man is said to have dared Horne to a duel of which he was shot dead. Another man also from Imenti apparently slapped Horne from which his father's property was taken and burned. In Igoji, two warriors apparently ambushed him and as consequence they were publicly whipped and only by elderly intervention did thirty others avoid the same fate. In another instance Kangangi is said to have encountered a Meru custom which allowed Nkuru(small former warrior bands) to go into the countryside looking for non-Meru males to "blood their spears" which supposedly cleansed the former age set of the stain incurred by expulsion and symbolically allowed the former warriors to formerly enter warriorhood. A skirmish with one of the Nkuru with Kangangi seemed to have thoroughly angered him and resulted in several casualties from which on he decided to stop the practice in Meru.

The most well known resistance however, came from a man in Miutini, a region formerly part of Cuka that had been overran by refugees and pioneers, it had maintained its sovereignty over other Meru with fierce military traditions and was rather unexposed to gunfire and modern weapons due to its isolation from caravans. At the time, Horne was already known in Tigania's furthest reaches and had established his headquarters in Imenti. On reaching South Miutini's boundaries, he passed by Kathigu, a small ridgetop community of a few homesteads with about forty warriors. Without warning, one of these forty struck Kangangi with a yam stem to the head. Kangangi decided to go back home and ask for help by Imenti warriors who were instructed to attack Kathigu and its collaborators and seize all of Kathigu's cattle for Kangangi. The Imenti descended on the village, outnumbered, Kathigu asked for assistance from all of Miutini and within minutes Miutini warriors had come to ally the Kathigu. They however, did not understand that these were not simple cattle raiders. As the Imenti poured in droves, Kangangi is said to have shot 4 Miutini warriors. In response, the other warriors stood in unity claiming that no bullets would harm them but were quickly scattered away by the gunshots. Kangangi's party then began a devastating cattle raid through that almost threatened to extend to all of Miutini but the situation was de-escalated when Kangangi supposedly received a scolding by the Igoji and Imenti councils who accused him of violating the peace and that, as a man of the warrior age set, he should step aside and let the elderly take care of the issue of which Kangangi did and thus peace was restored in Miutini by the elders themselves.

=== Kangangi's Meru: Colonialism, Elderhood, Warriorhood, Christianity and the Kagita ===
==== Colonialism and Warriorhood: Kangangi against Meru ====
By May 1908 Kangangi had established his temporary base at Kieni Kia Mwitari(literally "Mwitari's field") near today's Thuura village some 9 miles of present day Meru Town. The region had belonged to the general community and was used for festive dancing, general meetings, wrestling and was the traditional court from which elders like Mwitari wa M'Karandu would conduct court sessions. His incident at Miutini earlier on, had, however convinced him for the need of a more defensible site. Communications to Mwitari and other elders had led him to a small ridge unit of mostly untouched land just below the forest fridge close to the Kathita river known as Mutindwa, today's Meru Town. Horne had, by settling in land of the dead, been told of warnings of supernatural curses but dismissed them and by the end had had two Canadian style log cabins constructed which would serve as his house and the colonial office with a line of grass thatched huts in a permanent square as per British military style. Finally a trench was dug around diverting water from the River Kathita securing the settlement. To Kangangi and the Imenti, this was more or less a net benefit as the region would no longer be raided for whatever reasons. The real benefit, however was the general location to Kangangi. The region's panoramic view gave any man standing a top a wide view of Meru, with its openness hosting cool winds reminiscent of European climate and of course the secure supply of water from River Kathita.

Having established his settlement at Mutindwa, Kangangi moved his focus to the neighbouring Imenti. In order to enhance communication with the rest of the region, transport and communication networks were desperately needed. As in agreement with the Colonial Office in Nairobi, a road was to be made passing from Embu all the way to Igembe passing through his office.To do so, he had picked out Imenti's subjugated warriors to do the work of road construction. Progress was initially slow, the geography of the region made it very difficult and in some regions, only clearing of the grass could be done. Furthermore, there were no European tools available for disposal. Nor were the Meru in agreement, as 'digging' was traditionally a woman's job and that they could only at most clear the bush. Horne was outraged at this and completely refused to allow such as, in his world, it was men who did the hard work while the women languished. Regardless however, both sexes participated; chiefs recruited labor, using other appointees to recruit labor thus escaping the difficult work themselves. The men dag while the women carried the dirt to the roadsides, the work proving particularly exhausting when they needed to move up the enormous gorges in and around Mutindwa, streams that were once recreational zones and massive boulders of rock. Any resistance or slack was dealt with by beating ruthlessly often in front of their wives.

After doing so, the colonial office in Meru had to focus on building a native administration as suited to the Colonial Office in Nairobi. Having had his work considerably simplified by the removal of Cuka, Mwimbi, Muthambi and Tharaka to the Embu Colonial Office. With only the KAR backing his control, Horne decided to employ native warriors to fill in the ranks as "blanket askari''. To supplement his regional authority, each administrative division in Meru had to supply two chiefs with the gaaru(warrior hut) acting as the basic administrative unit which was governed by a senior set of warriors subordinate to the Njuri. Horne, aware of this tried to reclassify this form of governance in the European style by making chiefs for every age set and giving them various labels i.e the chief of the senior warrior's council would be known as the "chief's warrior" etc. This however proved unsustainable in the long term with a big issue being the dilution of authority due to the now much greater number of posts. For example, the chief warrior's role had basically been reduced to simply gather men for labor at Horne's command quickly rendering it defunct. Another issue was the ridicolous number of chief elders. Perhaps as much as 91 sets of 2 chief elders may have been required in the new system of administration with about 60 of them eventually being demoted to "headmen.''. Systematically, this was a hack in the social gaps of Meru. Horne had understood that promoting men in his view, that is men of vigour, administrative skill and physical presence, the Meru political framework would gradually "crack open" to his own authority. It was a silent but direct message to the Njuri that all authority would be now vested into the colonial office. Once more the Njuri was under direct attack and all that could be done was to watch.

==== Council of Elders ====
The Ameru have been governed by elected and hierarchical councils of elders since the 17th century. These extend from the clan level up to the supreme Njuri-Ncheke council. Membership of the Njuri Ncheke is the highest social rank to which a Meru man can aspire. The elders forming the Njuri-Ncheke are carefully selected and comprise mature, composed, respected and incorruptible members of the community. This is necessary as their work requires great wisdom, personal discipline, and knowledge of the traditions. The Njuri-Ncheke is also the apex of the traditional Meru judicial system and their edicts apply to the entire community.

The functions of the Njuri-Ncheke are to make and execute community laws, to hear and settle disputes, and to pass on community knowledge and norms across generations in their role as the custodians of traditional culture. Local disputes will invariably first be dealt with by lower ranks of the elders (Kiama), then the middle rank (Njuri) and finally the Njuri-Ncheke. However, the Njuri Ncheke does not handle matters involving non-Meru people, or those that are expressly designated as being under Kenya's common law. The determination of cases by the Njuri Ncheke, just like is for common law, relies a lot on case law and precedence.

A function of the Njuri-Ncheke is overseeing and enforcing the rules and regulations controlling the use and conservation of open grasslands, salt-licks and forests. Their work as conservators extends to the preservation of the Sacred Sites.

The Njuri-Ncheke is influential in socio-economic and political decision-making amongst the Meru. The council spearheaded the establishment of the Meru College of Science and Technology and donated 641 acres of community land in 1983 for its development. In 2008, the college was upgraded to a University College of Jomo Kenyatta University of Agriculture and Technology. In early 2013, the college was awarded a charter by President Mwai Kibaki and renamed to Meru University of Science and Technology. The Njuri Ncheke is represented in the University Council.

== Culture and family traditions ==
The Meru are primarily agrarian, and their home life and culture is similar to other Highland Bantus. The Meru have maintained adherence to a fairly strict customary code amongst the various cohorts of the population. For instance, circumcision is a mandatory rite of passage for boys, during which time cultural education including community norms and expectations, such as respect for elders and protection of children are taught in a seclusion period that may last up to a month. As a matter of principle, young men must ensure minimal contact with their mothers after initiation. Nowadays, the depth of instruction varies depending on the extent of urban influence. Previously, girls would also undergo Female genital mutilation, but the practice was outlawed by the Njuri-Nchekein April 1956. The practice has been progressively abandoned and is being replaced by instruction based alternative rites of passage.

=== Cuisine ===
Typical Meru cuisine includes nyani (traditional vegetables), mûkimo (mashed banana with traditional vegetables or potatoes), kîthere or mûthere (unfettered corn seeds cooked with beans or peas and traditional vegetables), nyama cia gwaakia (roasted meat), ūkie or ûcûrû (fermented porridge made from flour of corn, millet or sorghum), and rugicu (a mixture of honey meat and vegetables).

== Education ==
The Meru have a strong modern educational heritage provided by Christian missionaries. The main education institutions were started or sponsored by the Catholic, Methodist and Presbyterian churches. Greater Meru has numerous institutions of learning, including primary schools, secondary schools, teachers' training colleges, nursing schools, technical institutes and universities. One of the most prestigious chartered private universities in Kenya, Kenya Methodist University was the first to be established in the area in 2006. Three chartered public universities, Chuka University and Tharaka University in Tharaka-Nithi County and Meru University of Science and Technology in Meru County, have been established. Other institutions of higher learning, including the University of Nairobi, Egerton University, Kenyatta University, Co-operative University College, Nazarene University and Mount Kenya University have established satellite campuses in the area, making Greater Meru a key education hub in Kenya

== Economy ==
The Meru are primarily agrarian, growing a variety of crops and keeping livestock. Greater Meru is endowed with soils and climatic conditions that allow for the production of a variety of commodities including wheat, barley, potatoes, millet, sorghum and maize. High grade tea, coffee, bananas and miraa (khat) are the key cash crops. The Meru were the first Africans to grow coffee in Kenya, which they began in the early 1930s upon the implementation of the Devonshire White Paper of 1923. Other crops include groundnuts and a wide range of legumes, vegetables and fruits. The Meru also keep livestock, both for subsistence and commercial purposes. These include dairy and beef cattle, goats, sheep, poultry and honey bees. The Meru lands have huge potential for tourism by virtue of hosting the Meru and Mount Kenya national parks and the Lewa Conservancy. Mining activity is also expected to pick up once the ongoing exploratory works on the iron-ore deposits in Tharaka are completed.

== Politics and alliances ==
The Meru wield a lot of political influence in Kenya, due to their astute and strategic political organization. The current Deputy President of Kenya, Prof. Kithure Kindiki, is a Meru. Still, members of the community have always held some key and strategic positions in the government. In the early years of Kenya's independence, the Meru were in the Gikuyu, Embu, and Meru Association, a political mobilization outfit formed during the reign of Jomo Kenyatta. GEMA was formally banned in 1980, but since the advent of plural politics in Kenya in 1992, the Meru have largely voted with the Kikuyu and Embu in subsequent presidential elections.

In non-presidential elections, most constituencies in the Greater Meru vote for candidates based more on individual merit than on the basis of the sponsoring political party. This particularly manifested itself in the general elections of 2013, where the Orange Democratic Movement captured two seats, Igembe Central and Tigania East, in Meru County despite the predominance of the Jubilee Party in the larger region. The elections also saw the historic election of Rahim Dawood, a politician of Asian origin, to represent Imenti North Constituency and Kinoti Gatobu, a 26-year-old independent candidate, to represent Buuri Constituency.

== Meru Museum ==
The historical and cultural artifacts of the Meru are preserved at the Meru Museum, formerly the colonial office located in Meru Town. The Njuri Ncheke Shrine at Nchiru is also gazetted as a heritage site and placed under the care of the National Museums of Kenya. The Shrine is accessible and open to the public most time of the year unless there are Njuri Ncheke activities at the site. Members of the Njuri Ncheke, though bound by a strict oath of secrecy, can also provide valuable and authoritative information and insights into the Meru traditions and culture dating back to the yore and transmitted through generations.

== Notable Meru ==
=== Politicians ===
- Kinoti Gatobu, MP
- Gitobu Imanyara, MP, journalist, civil rights advocate
- Mutea Iringo, ex Principal Secretary, Ministry of Interior and Coordination of National Government
- Anne Kananu, former governor of Nairobi City County
- Kithure Kindiki, Deputy President of Kenya
- Martha Koome, Chief Justice of Kenya
- Bernard Mate, former Legco Representative for Central Province - Kenya
- Peter Munya, former Cabinet Secretary, former governor of Meru.
- Kiraitu Murungi, former governor of Meru County and MP
- Francis Muthaura, former Head of civil service Kenya
- David Mwiraria, former Finance Minister
- Kilemi Mwiria, educationalist and former Education assistant minister.
- Muthomi Njuki, governor of Tharaka Nithi County

=== Military ===
- Fatumah Ahmed, Major General and Commander of the Kenya Air Force
- Musa Mwariama, leader of the Mau Mau

=== Academia and research ===
- Jacob Kaimenyi, Cabinet Secretary for Lands - Kenya
- Margaret Kobia, Cabinet Secretary for Public Service - Kenya
- Leah Marangu, Vice Chancellor, African Nazarene University

=== Judiciary and law ===
- Martha Karambu Koome, Chief Justice of the Republic of Kenya
- Aaron Ringera, former Director Kenya Anti Corruption Commission (KACC)

=== Business and corporate ===
- Edward H. Ntalami, businessperson

=== Religion ===
- Samuel Kobia, former General Secretary, World Council of Churches (WCC)
- Silas Silvius Njiru, former Roman Catholic Bishop of Meru Diocese

=== Arts and entertainment ===
- Pierra Makena, DJ, actress
- Aaron Rimbui, pianist, keyboardist, bandleader, producer, festival curator and radio host.

== Notes ==
- Fadiman, Jeffrey A. (1993) When We Began, There Were Witchmen: An Oral History from Mount Kenya. Berkeley: University of California Press.
- Mauta, Thuranira. (2010). Retracing The Footsteps of Ameru and Their sub-tribal differences. Nkubitu Publishing Co. Mwenemeru Kinyua
