= Geoffrey Kiringa Ruku =

Kenyan politician and Cabinet Secretary

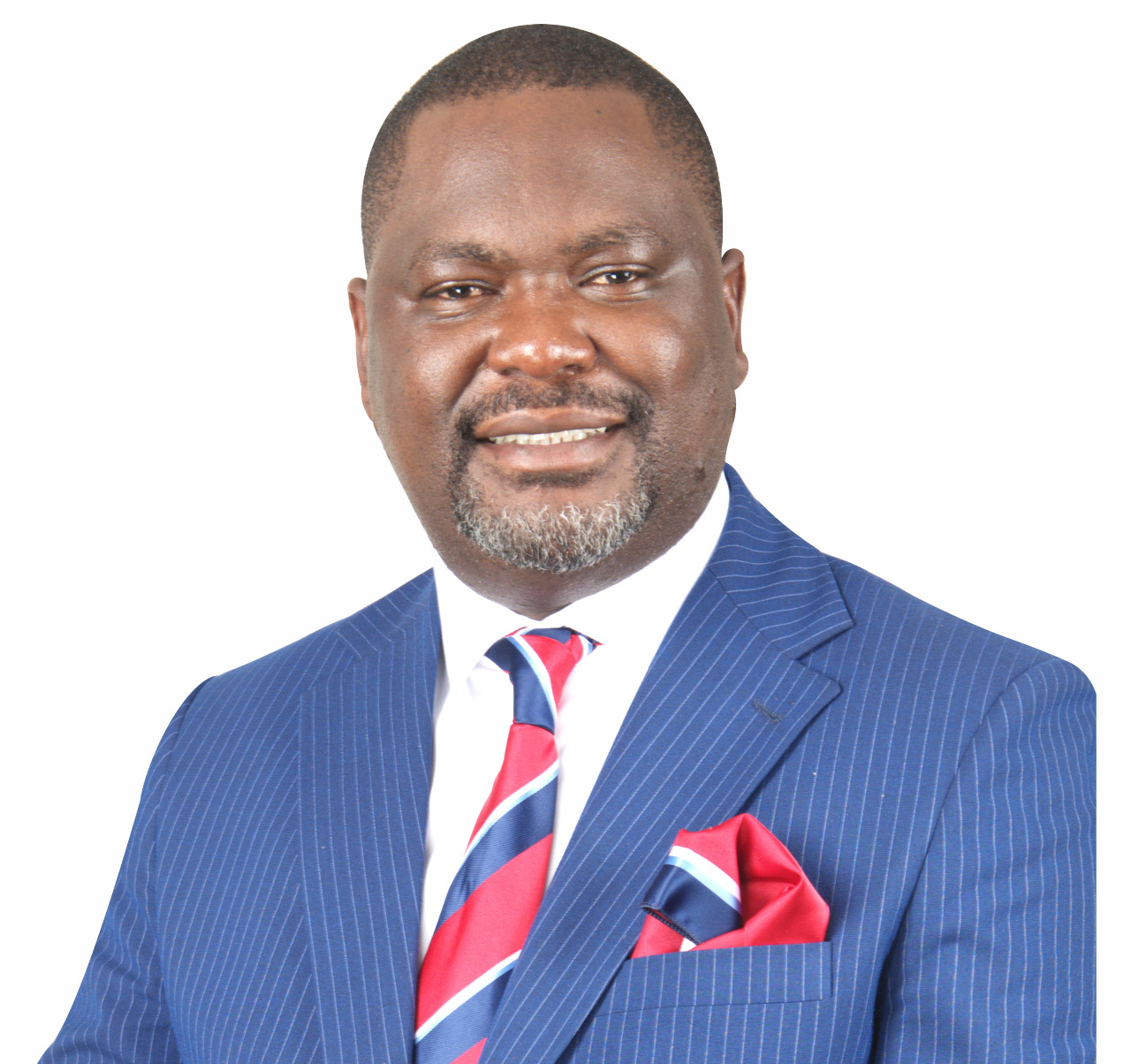
- Ruku in 2025

Cabinet Secretary for Public Service, Human Capital Development and Special Programmes
- Incumbent
- Assumed office 17 April 2025
- President: William Ruto
- Preceded by: Justin Muturi

Member of Parliament for Mbeere North Constituency
- In office 2022–2025
- Preceded by: Muriuki Njagagua

Personal details
- Born: 1980 (age 45–46) Embu County, Kenya
- Party: Democratic Party (Kenya)
- Education: Catholic University of Eastern Africa (B.Com.); University of Nairobi (PGDip International Relations; MBA Finance)
- Occupation: Politician

Geoffrey Kiringa Ruku (born 1980) is a Kenyan politician serving as the Cabinet Secretary for Public Service, Human Capital Development and Special Programmes since April 2025. He was the Member of Parliament for Mbeere North Constituency from 2022 to 2025.

== Early life and education ==
Ruku was born in Embu County. He earned a Bachelor of Commerce degree from the Catholic University of Eastern Africa in 2002, and later a Postgraduate Diploma in Diplomacy and International Relations (2005) and an MBA in Finance (2009) from the University of Nairobi.

== Professional career ==
From 2006 to 2009, Ruku worked as MASHAV coordinator at the Embassy of Israel in Kenya. He later engaged in climate finance and development projects, including leadership roles in private and non-governmental initiatives, and served as a trustee of Kenya’s Water Services Trust Fund from 2015 to 2017.

== Political career ==
=== Member of Parliament (2022–2025) ===
Ruku was elected MP for Mbeere North Constituency in the 2022 general election. In 2024 he introduced the Assembly and Demonstration Bill, 2024; after public criticism, he announced that he would withdraw the bill.

=== Cabinet Secretary (2025–present) ===
On 17 April 2025, President William Ruto appointed Ruku as Cabinet Secretary for Public Service, Human Capital Development and Special Programmes, succeeding Justin Muturi. During vetting he declared a net worth of KSh 377 million.

As CS, Ruku has announced plans for a mobile application to monitor attendance and productivity in the civil service and has conducted unannounced inspections of government offices.
