= Mbeere North Constituency =

Kenyan electoral constituency

Mbeere North
- constituency for the Parliament of Kenya
- Mbeere North Constituency within Embu County

- Embu County within Kenya
- County: Embu
- Population: 108,881
- Area: 784 km^{2} (302.7 sq mi)

Current constituency
- Number of members: 1
- Party: UDA
- Member of Parliament: Leo Wa Muthende Njeru
- Wards: 3

Mbeere North Constituency is an electoral constituency in Embu County, Kenya. It was formerly known as Siakago Constituency, one of two constituencies of the former Mbeere District. It has three wards, all of which elect MCAs for the county assembly.

The constituency was established for the 1988 elections from the bigger Embu East Constituency, which was divided to Runyenjes and Siakago constituencies.

Silvester Mate, the first Siakago MP, was the last Embu East MP, winning the seat in 1983.

Siakago town, the former district capital, is located within Nthawa location in this constituency. The current governor for Embu County is Cecily Mbarire.

== Members of Parliament ==
| Election/ Year | MP | Party | Notes |
|---|---|---|---|
| 1988 | Silvester Mate | KANU | One-party system. |
| 1992 | Gerald Ireri Ndwiga | KNC | Ndwiga defected to KANU in 1995 and won a subsequent by-election. |
| 1992 | Gerald Ireri Ndwiga | KANU | By-election |
| 1997 | Silas M’Njamiu Ita | DP | Ita died in 1999 |
| 1999 | Justin Muturi | KANU | By-elections |
| 2002 | Justin Muturi | NARC | |
| 2007 | Kivuti Maxwell | Safina | |
| 2013 | Muriuki Njagagua | APK | |
| 2022 | Geoffrey Kiringa Ruku | UDA | |
| 2025 | Leo Wa Muthende Njeru | UDA | By-election |

== Wards ==
There are three wards in Mbeere North Constituency: Evuvore, Nthawa, and Muminji. As of 2022, there are 55,124 registered voters.

| Ward | Registered Voters |
|---|---|
| Evuvore | 26,393 |
| Muminji | 9,849 |
| Nthawa | 18,882 |
| Total | 55,124 |
*As of 2022
