= Doreen Majala =

Kenyan lawyer and news anchor

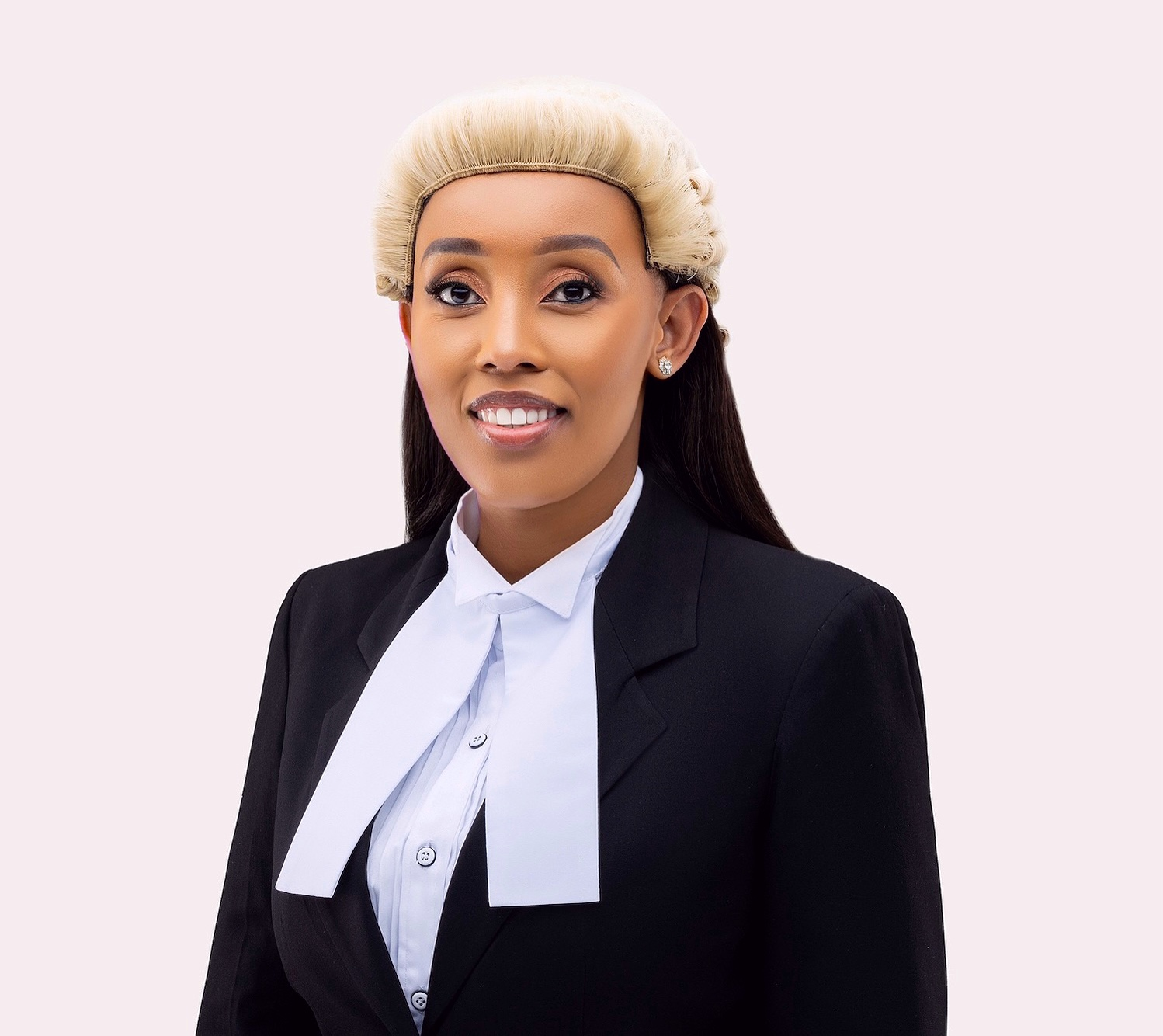
- Born: July 12, 1990 (age 36); Mombasa, Kenya
- Education: University of Nairobi: Kenya School of Law; Catholic University of Eastern Africa
- Occupations: Lawyer; Court Mediator; News Personality
- Years active: 2015 – present
- Television: NTV; Ebru TV
- Height: 1.7 m (5 ft 7 in)
- Website: Doreen Majala Foundation

Doreen Majala (born July 12, 1990) is a Kenyan lawyer and former news personality. She formerly worked for the Nation Media Group as a news anchor and show host.

== Early life and education ==
Majala was born on July 12, 1990, in Mombasa city, Kenya. She began her education in 1996 at Bomu Primary School in Mombasa and remained there until 2001. Later, she moved to Broadlight Junior Academy in Mombasa, where she completed her Kenya Certificate of Primary Education. Majala attended Nkuene Girls High School from 2006 to 2009 for her Kenya Certificate of Secondary Education. She, then, attained a certificate in Computer Studies from the Royal School of Applied Sciences in 2010. She obtained her undergraduate degree in Bachelor's of Laws (Hons) from the Catholic University of Eastern Africa in 2014. She proceeded to attend the Advocates Training Program (ATP) at the Kenya School of Law in 2015. From the Mediation Training Institute of East Africa, she obtained a certificate in professional mediation from the Mediation Training Institute of East Africa in early 2020. She is an accredited member of the Court-Annexed Mediation programme under the Mediation Accreditation Committee (MAC), a body of the Judiciary of Kenya, and a member of the Institute of Chartered Mediators and Conciliators (Kenya). She earned a Master of Business Administration from the University of Nairobi.

== Career ==
Majala joined media in 2015, while still in Law school, as a trainee reporter and trainee news anchor at Ebru TV, where she worked for three years until 2017. She anchored Swahili 7 pm news Mwanga Wa Ebru and doubled up as a producer and host of her show Tujadiliane, a Swahili weekly current affairs show. Majala, later, joined the Nation Media Group from July 2018 to December 2019, where she worked as a news anchor, reporter, and show host. She hosted Sunday Swahili 7 pm bulletins NTV Jioni and NTV Sasa, a Swahili current affairs show. She quit the media in December 2019 to focus on her law career and personal projects. Currently, she runs a Mediation Practice Resolution Chambers, LLC, based in Nairobi which specializes in commercial and civil Mediation.

Recently, Majala has taken a stance against the teen-age pregnancies, drug abuse, and other social issues.

== Philanthropy ==
Majala established the "Doreen Majala Foundation" in 2016, a non-profit organization that aims to increase educational opportunities by giving basic schooling necessities and resources in primary schools across the Kenya.

== Read also ==
- Muriuki Njagagua
- William Kamoti
