= Embu people =

Kenyan ethnic group

Aembu
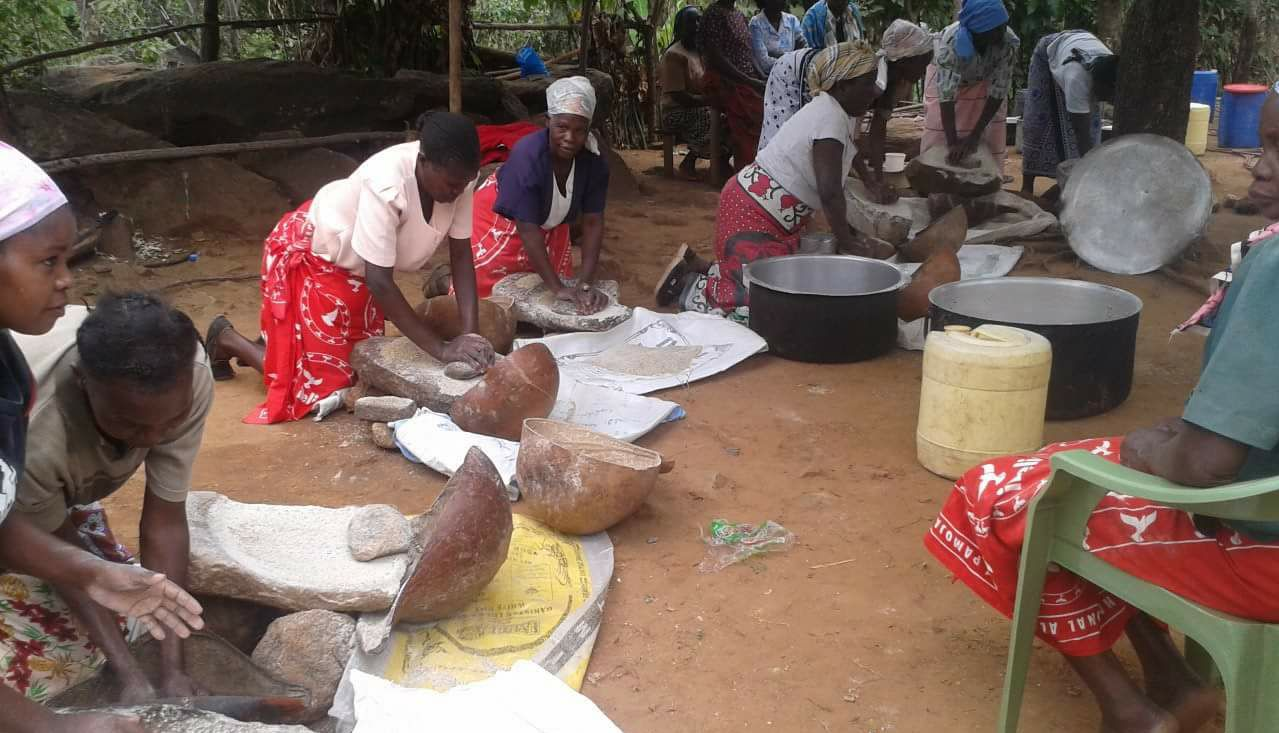
- Embu women grinding millet

Total population
- approx. 900,000 (2025)

Regions with significant populations
- Kenya

Languages
- Kiembu (mother tongue); Kiswahili, and English (working languages)

Religion
- Overwhelming Majority: Christianity; Significant Minority; Islam; Minority; Irreligious; African Traditional Religion

Related ethnic groups
- Kikuyu • Meru • Mbeere • Kamba • Dhaiso • Sonjo

- Person: Muembu
- People: Aembu
- Language: Kiembu
- Country: Vururi wa Embu

The Embu or Aembu (sometimes called Waembu) are a Bantu ethnic group indigenous to Embu county . The region is situated on the southern slopes of Mount Kenya in the former Eastern province. To the West, Embu neighbours the Kikuyu, The Meru border the Embu to the North and the Kamba border the Embu to the East and South.

The Embu comprise two subgroups: The Embu and Mbeere. The Mbeere live in the semi-arid part of the larger Embu County.

== Origin ==
Embu Traditional Drummers

The Embu are of Bantu origin. They are also known as the 'Aembu'. They are closely related in language and culture to the Kikuyu, Meru, and Kamba. They inhabit the southern windward slopes and farmlands of Mount Kenya. Along with their closely related Eastern Bantu neighbors the Kikuyu, Meru, Mbeere and Kamba the Embu are believed to have entered their present habitat from the coast of East Africa, where they had settled early on after the initial Bantu expansion from Cameroon.

The migration to Mount Kenya was occasioned by intertribal conflicts with the coastal Swahili and Mijikenda communities. Linguistic evidence suggests their migration from as far as the Kenyan Coast, since the Mĩĩrũ elders refer to Mpwa (Pwani or Coast,) as their origin, Felix Chami says "Pwani" is the Punt of ancient the Egyptians. These conflicts forced them to retreat Northwest to the interior of Kenya, and they settled by the slopes of Mount Kenya. They were to refer to this location as the place of the Lord, the owner of the snow ("Nyaga") or ("Njerũ" meaning white) – hence the name "Mwenenyaga" or "Mwenenjerũ".

Embu mythology claims that the Embu people originated from the current Mwenendega grove in the interior of Embu, close to Runyenjes town. The mythology claims that God (Ngai) created Mwenendega and gave him a beautiful wife at Gogo River Salt Lick, in Mukuuri, hence her name "Ciũrũnjĩ" or "Nthara". Gogo River separates Mukuuri Location and Gitare localities at the edge of a ridge called Mûrurîrî.

Eminent historian Prof Mwaniki Kabeca (in his 2005 book Mbeere Historical Texts, page 105) narrates that Mwenendega took his cattle to drink at the Gogo Salt Lick and found a girl who refused to talk to him at first. After much cajoling, she spoke with him and made him swear never to tell her negative things or abuse her, as there would be consequences.

The woman's parents were not known, and it was, therefore, believed she was sent by God.

Then one day the two, now man and wife, had a ceremony, where Ndega broke his promise and reproached his wife. It rained heavily, and the floods drowned the old couple.

Their children survived and their descendants filled the land of Embu.The couple was wealthy, and their descendants populated the rest of Embu.

Other authorities suggest that they arrived in their present Mount Kenya homeland from earlier settlements to the North and East, while others argue that the Embu, along with their closely related Eastern Bantu neighbours the Kikuyu, and the Meru moved into Kenya from points further north.

== History ==
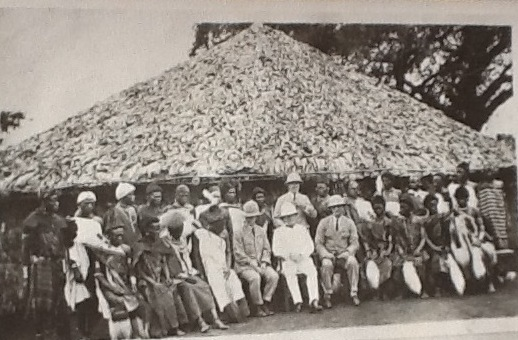
Paramount Chief Runyenje wa Mukobo, rear row between the seated white colonial officer

The Embu are cash crop and subsistence farmers who also rear cows, goats and sheep. A man's riches were formerly judged by how many wives and children he had. For example, Senior Chief Muruatetu, probably one of the most famous of the Aembu people, not only had sixteen wives and many children, but he was also a respected administration officer for the colonial government and independent Kenya. An entire village bears his name, and a school is named after him.

The Embu were fierce warriors who, although rarely raiding other tribes, always stood firm in defense of their territory and people. Many occasions are on record where the Embu had to fiercely repulse Kamba and even the dreaded Maasai invasions. They also rose against the British in the Mau Mau fight for Kenya's independence. The fact that the tribe was and continues to be considerably small explains their relatively small impact on the history of Kenya.

A photo of Embu warriors hangs at the Izaak Walton Inn in Embu, named after Izaak Walton, an Englishman who was enraptured by the fresh trout available in the rivers flowing through Embu. The Ruvingacĩ and Kavingacĩ Rivers border Embu town to the west and the east respectively and are a key source of domestic water to many Embu families.

Embu region has for long been known as having very conducive altitude and climate that produce highly superior human body system. There has however been very little or no efforts in engaging young people from this area in sporting activities to tap this advantage. However, the country's athletic team has immensely utilized the altitude and climate advantage of Embu through doing practices especially at Kigari teachers college and its environs, area that is at the slope of Mt. Kenya. These have gone on to win prestigious awards in the Olympics and competitive world marathons.

Clans And Lineages

MUTURI	IRUMA	KINA	IGANDU	MUTURI	GICUKU	MATAU	RWAMBA	NGAI	KITHAMI	NJUKI	GICUKU	MATAU	KITHAMI
Muriria	Muyathitha	Kamau	Getanguthi	Gitangaruri	Ndwiga	Nginyane	Mutambuki	Njuranio	Kamwocere	Nginyirua	Mbogo	Kabogo	Kibariki
Ruciria	Njau	Muthanu	Mutundu	Kivunga	Gataara	Makururu	Kariungi	Muturi	Nthiga	Kabugua	Kamwea	Gacigua	Kamwea
Kathunga	Mugo	Kariru	Mugo	Ngai	Murenji	Murinda	Gacaria	Nyaga	Kuyina	Ireri	Njue	Karico	Munyiri
Icaria	Mbogo	Kauru	Nguruma	Murimi	Gutaria	Kirai	Ngure	Ithiga	Mirori	Ndethia	Murega	Kanyaari	Njeru
Njue	Kiriti	Njeru	Nyaga	Nguma	Ireri		Mbogo	Mutua	Nthiga	Gakuru	Muruanguu	Mbogo	Njagi
Icaria	Murira			Gikorwe	Ndaru		Njeru	Gakuu	Mirori	Njuki	Mutuamigui	Mbui	Migui
Nvuria	Njau			Mugwarunjiri	Mbii		Kivuti	Karumi	Kithami		Namu	Nguru	Nyaga
Kirumba				Muturi	Igamwaniki			Mukuria	Nyaga		Ireri		Ireri
Ngari				Njagi	Migui			Ngomi	Njagi		Kiura		Marema
Mikui					Ndwiga			Ndumara	Embu		Nvungu		Kithami
Njeru					Nthiga			Ngae					Nyaga
Nthugi					Kagatu								
Muvingo					Kaviu								
Kathiiri													

== Language ==
The Embu speak the Embu language, (also known as Kiembu) as a mother tongue. It belongs to the Bantu branch of the Niger-Congo family. Kiembu, Kimiiru and Kikuyu share critical language characteristics. Additionally many speak Swahili and English as lingua franca, the two official languages of Kenya.

== Education ==
Embu has numerous institutions of learning, including primary schools, secondary schools, teacher's training colleges technical institutes, universities and nursing schools. The Embu have a strong educational heritage which was provided by the Christian missionaries. The main education institutions were started or sponsored by the Catholic, Anglican, Salvation Army, and Methodist churches. One chartered Public university, The University of Embu was the first to be established in Embu region. Another chartered university is the Kenya Anglican University located in Kanyuambora.

== Economy ==
Embu lies on the windward slopes of Mount Kenya. It remarkably occupies the most prime fertile lands of the Kenya highlands. Two seasons are enjoyed each year, and the weather is favourable for diverse agricultural activities. The main food crops grown are maize, beans, yams, cassava, millet, sorghum, bananas and arrowroot, among others. This, alongside the domestic livestock of cows, goats, sheep and chicken, keeps the people well fed throughout the year. Instances of drought or famine are extremely rare. Embu county has repeatedly been ranked among the richest counties in Kenya and recent demographic surveys have ranked it among counties with longest life expectancy.

With the advent of colonialism, many cash crops were introduced. For long these have offered a lucrative alternative source of livelihood for the people. The most widespread cash crops to date are coffee, tea, muguka (khat) and macadamia nuts. These are mainly grown for sale with little being processed for domestic consumption. Embu district is the richest District in Kenya

== Tourist attractions ==
The district is home to Mount Kenya to the north. This is a tourism attraction with many foreigners and local people visiting its slopes. Numerous expeditions set out each year to scale the slopes to the mountain top. This climb is not easy and calls for great stamina and resilience. Legend has it that one man Munyao did scale the mountain to the peak and hoisted the national flag during the independence day on 12 December 1963.

Other attractions in the region are the huge Karue hill towering high along the Embu-Meru highway. Made of a huge crested rock, at the top of the hill are two unique eucalyptus trees. From the summit there are views of the far reaches of Embu. Nearby to this hill are two waterfalls close together which color the sky white as their waters fall down, then marry to form one big Ena river that then meanders downstream to encircle the Karue hill. The Kirimiri hill is also nearby. Though not open for tourism, it is home to a diverse array of wildlife. The hill is home to natural forests which are indigenous to the region. The hill is suitable for hiking purposes as there are no life-threatening wildlife. Embu is home to Mwea National Reserve. Best known for the diversity of bird species in the reserve. Ancient caves are also found in Embu, commonly referred to as 'Ngurunga ya Ngai' by the Embu natives.

== Culture and beliefs ==
The Aembu believe in a monotheistic, invisible and transcendental God, Ngai or Murungu who lives in the sky. He is perceived as the omnipotent creator of life on earth and as a merciful, if distant, entity. The traditional Aembu perceive the spirits of their departed ones as the intercessors between themselves and Ngai or Murungu. They are remembered in family offerings/libations at Individual altars. Although the Aembu historically adhered to indigenous faiths, most are Christians today, of varying denominations, as well as various synthetic forms of Christianity. A minority of the Embu practice Islam notably through Arab, Indian, Persian missionaries since trade with the rest of East Africa. The Embu are primarily agrarian, and their home life and culture is similar to other Highland Bantus. The Embu have maintained adherence to a fairly strict customary code amongst the various cohorts of the population.

=== Cuisine ===
Typical Embu cuisine includes Nyeni (traditional vegetables), Mukimo (mashed banana with traditional vegetables or potatoes), Githere or Muthere (unfettered corn seeds cooked with beans or peas and traditional vegetables), Nyama cia gwakia (roasted meat), Ucuru or Ukie or Kirurio, Kimere (fermented porridge made from flour of corn, millet or sorghum), Irio (mashed dry beans, corn and potatoes), Mutura (sausage made using goat intestines, meat and blood), yams, cassava and sweet potatoes.

=== Music and arts ===
A troupe of Embu drummers

The Aembu love for music and dance is evidenced in their performances on occasions of regional and national importance or many events in their daily lives. In their dances, they display agility as they perform acrobatics and body movements. The Aembu dance techniques resemble those of the Akamba people of Kenya. Cultural loss and increased urbanisation and modernization has heavily impacted on indigenous knowledge.

== List of notable Aembu and people of Aembu descent ==
- Justin Muturi - Speaker of the Kenyan National Assembly 2013-2022
- Jeremiah Nyagah - Member of pre-independence Legislative Council and National Assembly of Kenya
- John Njue - Kenyan Cardinal and fourth Archbishop of the Roman Catholic Archdiocese of Nairobi
- Cecily Mutitu Mbarire - Governor of Embu County
- Martin Wambora - former Governor of Embu County
- Joseph Nyagah - Kenyan politician and former Minister of Cooperative Development
- Patrick Njiru - former Kenyan rally driver with Subaru World Rally Team

== See also ==
- Gikuyu, Embu, and Meru Association (GEMA)
