= Muriuki Njagagua =

Kenyan lawyer and politician

Muriuki Charles Njagagua is a Kenyan lawyer and politician who was a member of the 11th parliament of Kenya for Mbeere North Constituency on the ticket of Alliance Party of Kenya (APK).

== Education and career ==
Njagagua, born in Mbeere, Embu County, studied law at the University of Nairobi from 1992 to 1996. He is managing partner of Muriuki Nyagagua & Associates law firm. He was elected to the lower house of Kenyan parliament on the ticket of APK in 2013 after defeating incumbent MP Justin Muturi of The National Alliance. Njagagua served on the house committee on Education, Research and Technology. According to Mzalendo Trust, he spoke 252 times in the parliament from 2013 to 2016. Njagagua was defeated in the 2017 election by Geoffrey Kiringa Ruku. In 2022, Njagagua announced he would give Sh2,000 to every woman who gives birth to increase the population of Mbeere North Constituency following the announcement by Independent Electoral and Boundaries Commission to scrap the constituency if the population failed to grow from its current 133,000 to over 170,000 minimum population required to be a constituency.

== Read also ==
- Doreen Majala
- William Kamoti
