= Ngai =

African deity

Ngai (also known as Múrungu or Enkai) is the central deity in the traditional spiritualities of the Gĩkũyũ, as well as the related Embu, Meru, Kamba, and Maasai peoples of Kenya and Tanzania. Within these belief systems, Ngai is recognized as the creator of the universe and all existing things. Traditional worship often involves facing Mount Kenya, a location of central spiritual significance to these communities. Rituals, including prayers and sacrifices, are historically performed under the Mugumo (fig tree). These ceremonies are typically conducted during significant environmental or social events, such as droughts, epidemics, or agricultural cycles, as well as during major life transitions, including birth, marriage, and death.

== Ngai in Kikuyu, Embu, Meru and Kamba Worship ==
Ngai was often referred to as "Mwene Nyaga", meaning "Owner of the Dazzling Light". Kenyan anthropologist, later president, Jomo Kenyatta notes that: "In prayers and sacrifices Ngai is addressed by the Gikuyu as Mwene-Nyaga (possessor of brightness)." He went on to write that: "This name is associated with Kĩrĩ-Nyaga (the Gikuyu name for Mount Kenya), which means: That which possesses brightness, or mountain of brightness."

In Gĩkũyũ tradition, the origin of the community is attributed to an ancestral couple, Gĩkũyũ and Mũmbi, who were brought together by the deity Ngai. According to this narrative, Ngai designated Mount Kenya (Kīrīnyaga) as a site of divine manifestation and observation. The couple’s nine daughters are held to be the eponymous ancestors of the nine principal Gĩkũyũ clans: (1) Aceera, (2) Agacikũ, (3) Agathĩgia, (4) Ambũi, (5) Angarĩ, (6) Anjirũ, (7) Angũi, (8) Ethaga, and (9) Angeci.

== Historical and Anthropological Context ==
Early inhabitants of Mount Kenya prior to the Bantu migration

While this narrative establishes the mountain as a central spiritual landmark for the Gĩkũyũ, historical and archaeological evidence indicates that the Mount Kenya region was inhabited by diverse populations long before the arrival of Bantu-speaking groups. These earlier inhabitants included Southern Cushitic-speaking pastoralists and Nilotic groups, as well as Southern Nilotic hunter-gatherer communities such as the Ogiek (who are prominent in Gĩkũyũ oral history). The establishment of the Gĩkũyũ in the central highlands was a gradual process involving the migration, interaction, and eventual assimilation of these pre-existing populations.

== Ngai in Maasai Worship ==
In Maasai tradition, Ngai (also referred to as Engai or Enkai) is the creator deity, characterized by a dual nature encompassing both masculine and feminine principles. The Maasai refer to Ngai's primordial dwelling as "Ol Doinyo Lengai" which literally means "The Mountain of God", which they believe is in Northern Tanzania.

Ngai or Enkai's name is synonymous to "rain."

In the Maasai religion, the Laibon (plural: Laiboni) intercedes between the world of the living and the Creator. They are the Maasai's high priests and diviners. In addition to organizing and presiding over religious ceremonies—including sacrifice and libation, they also heal the living, physically and spiritually.

== See also ==
- God in Bantu mythology
- List of solar deities

== Bibliography ==
- Kenyatta, Jomo, Facing Mount Kenya, (introduction by B. Malinowski) originally published by Martin Secker & Warburg LTD, (1938), [in] South African History Online, pp. 22–23, 41, 233-234, (Retrieved 5 April 2019)
- Ben-Jochannan, Yosef, African Origins of the Major "Western Religions", Black Classic Press (reprint, 1991), pp. 42–49, ISBN 9780933121294 (Retrieved 5 April 2019)
- Middleton, John; Kershaw, Greet; The Kikuyu and Kamba of Kenya: East Central Africa, Part 5, Routledge (reprint, 2017), p. 128, ISBN 9781315313115 (Retrieved 5 April 2019)
- Kenyatta, Jomo (1965). Facing Mt. Kenya (2nd ed.). Vintage Books. p. 175
- Olney, James, Tell Me Africa: An Approach to African Literature, Princeton University Press (2015), p. 88, ISBN 9781400870592, Retrieved 5 April 2019)
