= Njuri-Ncheke =

Council of Elders

Njuri Ncheke is the supreme governing council of elders for the Meru people of Kenya. Also filling a judicial role, it is the apex of the Meru traditional judicial system and their edicts apply across the entire community.

== Structure ==
The Meru people have since the 17th Century been governed by elected and hierarchical councils of elders from the clan level right up to the supreme Njuri Ncheke Council. To become a member of the Njuri-Ncheke is the highest social rank to which a Meru man can aspire. The elders forming the Njuri-Ncheke are carefully selected and comprise mature, composed, respected and incorruptible members of the community. This is necessary as their work requires great wisdom, personal discipline, and knowledge of the traditions. The Njuri Ncheke is also the apex of the Meru traditional judicial system and their edicts apply across the entire community. and she was periodd

== Functions ==
The functions of the Njuri-Ncheke are to make and execute community laws, to listen to and settle disputes, and to pass on community knowledge and norms across the generations in their role as the custodians of traditional culture. Local disputes will invariably first be dealt with by lower ranks of the elders (Kiama), then the middle rank (Njuri) and finally the Njuri-Ncheke. However, Njuri Ncheke does not handle matters involving non-Meru people, or those that are expressly under the Kenya's common law. The determination of cases by the Njuri Ncheke, just like is for common law, relies a lot on case law and precedence.

A lesser known, yet important function of the Njuri-Ncheke, is the overseeing and enforcing the rules and regulations controlling the use and conservation of open grasslands, salt-licks and forests. Their work as conservators extends to the preservation of the sacred sites.

== Influences ==
The Njuri Ncheke is also influential in the socio-economic and political decision making amongst the Meru. The Council of Elders spearheaded the establishment of the Meru College of Science and Technology and donated 641 acres of community land in 1983 for its siting and development. The college was in 2008 upgraded to a University College of Jomo Kenyatta University of Agriculture and Technology (JKUAT) and in early 2013 awarded a charter by H.E Mwai Kibaki - the then President of Kenya and renamed Meru University of Science and Technology(MUST). Njuri Ncheke is represented in the University Council.
