= Jackson Harvester Angaine =

Kenyan politician (1903-1999)

Minister for Lands and Settlement
- In office 1963–1979
- Appointed by: Jomo Kenyatta

Personal details
- Born: 1903 Gautuku Village, Ntima Location, Meru
- Died: 23 February 1999 (aged 95–96) Timau, Meru, Kenya
- Party: KANU
- Parent(s): Julia Kaburi Angaine, M'Ithiira M'Angaine
- Occupation: Politician

Jackson Harvester Nteere Angaine (1903-1999), popularly known as the "King of Meru", was a key political figure in Kenya's Meru County from the 1960's until his death in 1999. In 1963 he was appointed Cabinet Minister for Lands and Settlement by Jomo Kenyatta and remained in the Cabinet until 1979.

As members of the Kenya African Union (KAU) Angaine and Kenyatta had been arrested in 1952 for their part in the Mau Mau uprising or "Kenya Emergency" which paved the way for independence in 1963. During the Emergency the KAU was banned by the colonial government until 1960 when Angaine was one of the founding members of the Kenya African National Union (KANU) alongside other political pioneers such as James Gichuru and Achieng Oneko.

Upon his release Angaine was elected to the Legislative Council alongside Jaramogi Oginga Odinga and Tom Mboya and raised funds from the people of Meru to buy a Mercedes Benz for Kenyatta before his own release from prison. Angaine became one of Kenyatta's most trusted advisors who in turn rewarded him with a cabinet role when he became Prime Minister in 1963 and Kenya's first president in 1964.

In 1979 Angaine lost his parliamentary seat to Nteere Mbogori but was returned to Parliament in 1983 and in 1985 to the Cabinet of Daniel arap Moi as Minister in the Office of the President. He held this position until he was replaced by David Mwiraria in 1992.

As Minister for Lands and Settlement, Angaine played a controversial role in distribution of land regained from white settlers with accusations of land allocation to the new government elite at the expense of the rural poor.

== Early life ==
Jackson Harvester Angaine was born in 1903 under the name of Jackson Harvester M'Nchebere. He was the first born son of Julia Kaburi and M'Ithiira M'Angaine during the British's colonial occupation of Kenya which was characterized by an administration following the Westminster model. While the colonial government was dominated by British officials it also comprised loyalist Kenyan chiefs including Jackson's father, prominent leader of the Njuri Nchecke (the "traditional" Meru government/council). This privileged position enabled Jackson to go to school in Kaaga run by white Christian missionaries. Later he attended Alliance High School where he distinguished himself as a boxer. He studied education at Achimota College in Ghana before working as a teacher and serving in the colonial civil service.

Jackson was the eldest of 11 siblings with 5 brothers and 5 sisters. The family belonged to the Gantunku clan, a sub-clan of the larger Igoki clan. His middle name Nteere means "fringes" and was after his paternal grandfather, so called because he looked after animals at the edge of the forest. He later acquired the nickname "Harvester" associated with his farming prowess and that he was one of the first farmers in Meru to practise mechanized farming.

== Marriage and children ==
Angaine married his first wife Rosemary Gacheri in 1937 and in line with Meru custom later married several other wives, the last of whom, Jeniffer in 1967, was instrumental to his political career representing him in meetings. While polygamy was at odds with Christianity he had nevertheless been raised as a Christian which was reflected in the names he gave his children including his first daughter Honesty and sons Mugambi, "John Baptist‟ and Mutuma "Christian Immanuel". In total he had 7 wives.

Angaine’s daughter Mary Elizabeth was the first Carmelite nun of African descent in Kenya and later emigrated to the United States where she became first Sister, then Mother Mary Elizabeth of Our Lady of Confidence Carmelite Monastery in Savannah, Georgia.

In 1978 another of Angaine’s daughters Judy, a Captain in the army, was murdered. Her body was discovered in the bath of her home on 30 March 1978, she had been sexually assaulted and strangled. Her boyfriend Major David Kimeu Kisila was arrested and charged with the murder, but was later acquitted. Suspicion also fell on politician Paul Ngei after an earlier incident when the MP is alleged to have touched Judy inappropriately and said that he loved her causing a car accident. The crime remains unsolved.

== Political life ==
Angaine started his political life in 1935 when he became secretary for the Meru Local Native Council until 1948. From 1948-1952, Angaine served as chairman of the Kenya African Union (KAU) before his involvement with Mau Mau and incarceration in Kajiado, Mackinnon Road, Hola and finally Manda Island for prisoners identified as ringleaders of the uprising. Mau Mau also led to his popularity with the Meru community and to leadership positions in the emerging political landscape. In the first election of 1961 he was candidate for the Kenya African National Union (KANU).

After independence the priority of the new Kenyan government was the orderly transfer of land from colonial ownership and in 1963 Angaine was appointed Minister of Lands and Settlement, Survey and Town planning by President Jomo Kenyatta in the first Cabinet of an independent Kenya.

Land resettlement schemes financed by Britain, the World Bank and the Commonwealth Development Corporation required settlers to have agricultural experience and capital of their own while the One Million Acre Schemes financed by Britain and Germany were for those with less experience and financial resources.

While generally held to be successful, land resettlement under Angaine was not without controversy and the so called Z-plot scheme was accused of favouring elite members of the new government with cheap options on land and colonial housing. In July 1966 a commission was appointed by the British Government to investigate the scheme and which established that the new owners did not actually occupy the land they had been allocated. Annoyed by British interference, Kenyatta and Angaine persisted with the scheme which has resulted in contentious land ownership up to the present day.

In 1976 a campaign to change the constitution was initiated by the Gikuyu, Embu and Meru Association (GEMA) community leaders to prevent Vice President Daniel arap Moi from automatically assuming the presidency on the death of Jomo Kenyatta. Againe joined the campaign and is reported as saying that “since law is made by man, it can be amended by man, if need be”. When Kenyatta died in 1978 and Moi became President, Angaine found himself politically isolated and lost his seat to Nteere Mbogori in the 1979 General Election. He returned to parliament in 1983 following the dismissal of Minister for Constitutional Affairs Charles Njonjo after he was accused of being a traitor. Two years later in 1985 he was appointed Minister in the Office of the President.

In the ‘mlolongo’ election of 1988 and now well into his 80’s, he was re-elected and asked his constituents to declare him MP for life. He lost his seat in 1992 however to David Mwiraria then finally his Meru District KANU chairmanship, which he had held since independence, to Silas Muriuki.

In 1990, ahead of a planned pro-democracy rally at Nairobi’s Kamukunji grounds, Angaine was implicated in the detention of lawyer and future Supreme Court judge Mohammed Ibrahim, accusing him of being involved in a plot to overthrow the Government.

== Later life and death ==
After losing his seat in 1992 and beginning to suffer with poor health, Angaine retired to his farm in Timau where he was looked after by his 7th wife Jeniffer. He died from heart failure on February 23, 1999.
