= Linda Watiri Muriuki =

Kenyan lawyer and corporate executive

- Born: 1964 (age 61–62); Nigeria
- Citizenship: Kenya
- Education: York University (Bachelor of Arts in Economics); University of Leeds (Bachelor of Laws); Kenya School of Law (Advocates Training Programme); United States International University Africa (Master of Business Administration)
- Occupations: Lawyer, corporate executive
- Years active: 1989–present

Linda Watiri Muriuki (born 1964), is a Kenyan lawyer, who is the managing partner at LJA Associates, a law firm based in Nairobi, Kenya's capital city. Since her appointment in September 2017, she concurrently is a member of the board of directors at Safaricom Plc., the largest mobile network provider in Kenya.

== Background and education ==
Muriuki was born in Nigeria in 1964. In 1983 she was admitted to York University, in Toronto, Canada, where she graduated with a Bachelor of Arts degree in Economics. She then transferred to the University of Leeds in the United Kingdom, where she obtained a Bachelor of Laws degree in 1988. She then underwent training Advocates Training Programme at the Kenya School of Law, in Nairobi and was admitted to the Kenyan Bar. In 2010, she obtained a Global Executive Masters of Business Administration from the United States International University Africa in collaboration with Columbia University, in New York City.

== Work experience ==
Muriuki worked as a law partner with two law firms in Kenya, before joining LJA Associates. She was partner at Daly & Inamdar, Advocates (1997–2003) and at McVicker & Muriuki (2004–2011). In 2011 she joined LJA Associates, where she is a senior partner and the managing partner.

== Other considerations ==
She is a board member of East Africa Reinsurance Company Limited. She was previously a non-executive director of Old Mutual Life Assurance Company Limited (2004–2010) and of the Capital Markets Authority of Kenya (2015–2017). She is a member of the Law Society of Kenya, a member of the Institute of Directors of Kenya, a Chevening Scholar, and an Eisenhower Fellow of Kenya (2003).
