= Justin Muturi =

7th Speaker of the National Assembly of Kenya

Honourable Justin Muturi (E.G.H.)
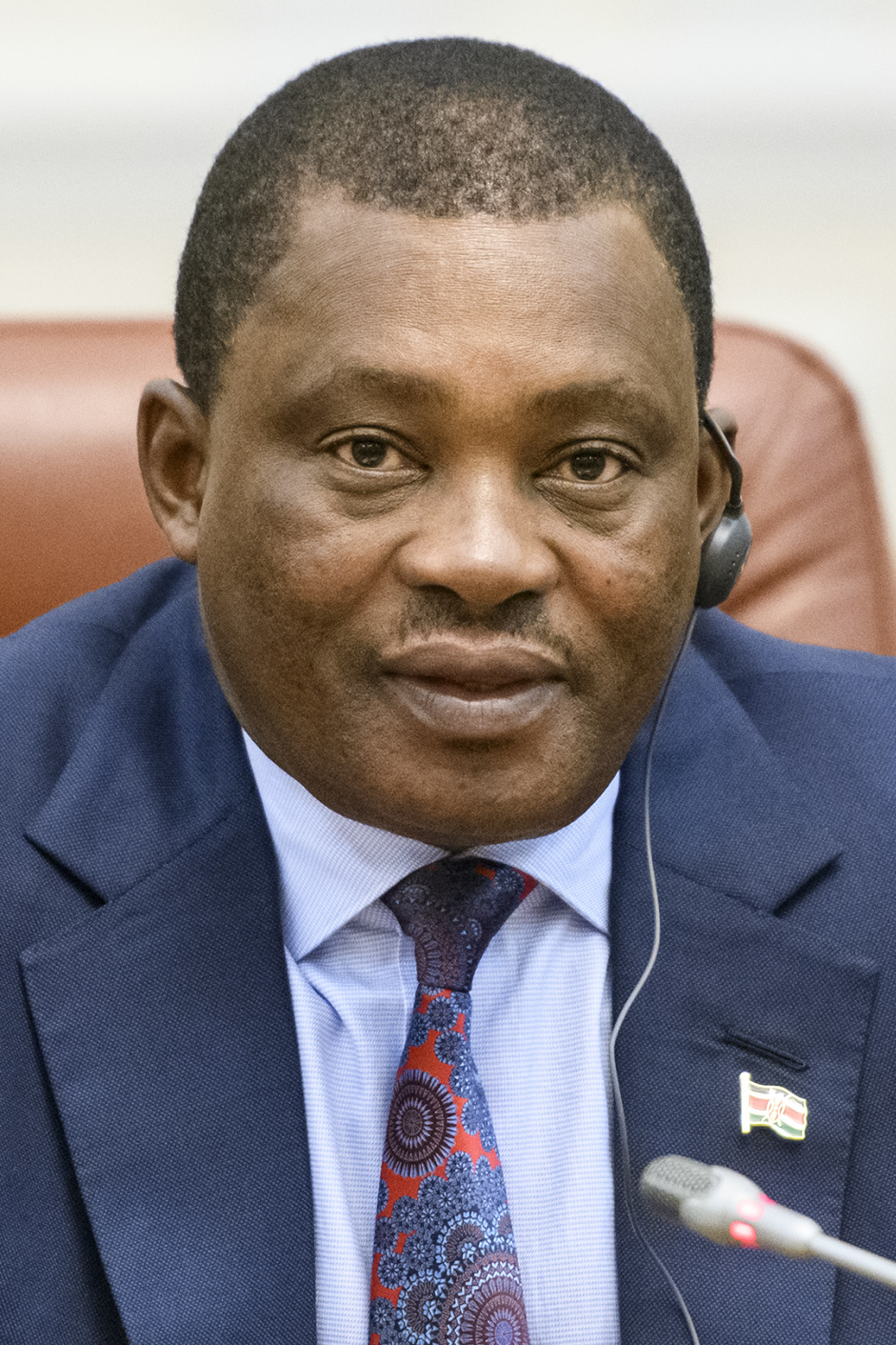
- Muturi in 2019

Cabinet Secretary, Ministry of Public Service and Human Capital Development
- In office 8 August 2024 – 26 March 2025
- President: William Ruto
- Preceded by: Moses Kuria
- Succeeded by: Geoffrey Kiringa Ruku

8th Attorney General of Kenya
- In office 27 October 2022 – 11 July 2024
- President: William Ruto
- Preceded by: Paul Kihara Kariuki
- Succeeded by: Dorcas Oduor

7th Speaker of the National Assembly of Kenya
- In office 28 March 2013 – 8 August 2022
- Deputy: Moses Cheboi
- Preceded by: Kenneth Marende
- Succeeded by: Moses Wetang'ula

Chairman of the Public Investments Committee, National Assembly of Kenya & Opposition Chief Whip
- In office 18 February 2003 – 22 October 2007

Chairman of the Public Investments Committee, National Assembly of Kenya
- In office 18 February 2003 – 22 October 2007
- President: Mwai Kibaki
- Preceded by: Wafula Wamunyinyi
- Succeeded by: Franklin Mithika Linturi

Member of Parliament for Siakago Constituency
- In office 5 October 1999 – 22 October 2007
- President: Daniel arap Moi; Mwai Kibaki
- Preceded by: Silas Ita
- Succeeded by: Lenny Kivuti

Personal details
- Born: Justin Bedan Njoka Muturi; 28 April 1956 (age 69) Kanyuambora, Embu District, Central Province, Kenya Colony
- Party: Kenya African National Union; The National Alliance; Democratic Party; Kenya Kwanza (since 2022)
- Education: University of Nairobi (LLB)

Justin Bedan Njoka Muturi (born 28 April 1956) is a Kenyan politician who was the 7th Speaker of the National Assembly from 2013 to 2022, and 8th Attorney General of Kenya from 2022 to 2024.

== Early life and education ==
Justin Bedan Njoka Muturi was born on 28 April 1956. He attended Kangaru High School. He graduated with a Bachelor of Laws degree from the University of Nairobi after attending from 1978 to 1981. He conducted postgraduate studies at the Kenya School of Law.

== Career ==
=== Law ===
Muturi was admitted to the bar in 1982, and being an advocate of the High Court. From 1982 to 1997, he was a principal magistrate.

Geoffrey Joel Momanyi and Fellgona Akothe Momanyi accused Muturi of trying to solicit a KSh1 million bribe from them. On 28 July 1995, they were arraigned before Muturi for allegations of defrauding the National Hospital Insurance Fund of KSh347,000. The couple were acquitted in 1997. Bribery charges were brought up against Muturi, but he was acquitted in 1997.

=== National Assembly ===
Silas Ita, a member of the National Assembly from the Siakago Constituency, died. Muturi was elected to replace him in a 1999 by-election as a candidate of the Kenya African National Union (KANU) and retained the seat in the 2002 election. Lenny Kivuti defeated Muturi in the 2007 election. He ran in the Mbeere North constituency as a candidate of The National Alliance in the 2013 election, but lost to Muriuki Njagagua.

From 2003 to 2007, Muturi was the chief whip for the opposition. He became national organizing secretary of KANU in 2008. During his tenure in the assembly he was chair of the Public Investments Committee.

Muturi considered running for Speaker in 2008, but withdrew in favour of Francis Ole Kaparo, who lost to Kenneth Marende. Muturi defeated Marende in the second round of voting by a vote of 219 to 129 to become speaker on 28 March 2013. He was reelected speaker in 2017, with his opponent Noah Winja only receiving one vote in the second round.

=== Attorney General ===
Muturi was the leader of the Democratic Party until he resigned from the position to become Attorney General of Kenya.

Muturi joined Kenya Kwanza in 2022.

== Personal life ==
Muturi is married and is the father of three children.

== Works cited ==
=== News ===
- "Muturi elected Speaker of National Assembly". The Standard. 28 March 2013. Archived from the original on 2 April 2015.
- "Muturi re-elected National Assembly Speaker". Kenya Broadcasting Corporation. 31 August 2017. Archived from the original on 31 August 2017.
- "The Ruto administration: Profile of Attorney General nominee, Justin Muturi". NTV. 17 October 2022. Archived from the original on 5 July 2025.
- Mwangi, James (11 October 2015). "Doctor who 'finished' National Assembly Speaker Muturi's legal career dies". The Standard. Archived from the original on 12 November 2015.
- Oeri, William (28 March 2013). "A promise to uphold dignity of the House". Daily Nation. Archived from the original on 5 July 2025.

=== Web ===
- "The Speaker". National Assembly. Archived from the original on 22 June 2013.
