= Gikuyu, Embu, and Meru Association =

Ethnic association in Kenya

The Gikuyu, Embu, Meru, and Akamba (GEMA) is an organisation in Kenya created to presumably advance the social and political needs of the Eastern Kenya Bantu people of Gikuyu, Embu, Meru, and Akamba who though are closely related linguistically and culturally but don't have common mythologies or history. It was founded in 1971, with an economic arm, GEMA Holdings.

GEMA was formally registered by Attorney General Charles Njonjo by the instructions of president Jomo Kenyatta. Njonjo himself became an opponent of the group and in 1976 charged some of its members, including Kihika Kimani and Njenga Karume, with treason: the order was soon rejected by the president, Jomo Kenyatta. Other prominent GEMA figures included Njoroge Mungai, Jeremiah Nyagah, and Jackson Angaine.

GEMA was formally banned in 1980, during a national consultative meeting held at the then Kenya Institute of Administration (KIA)Kabete, which has since been renamed as the Kenya School of Government. An attempt to revive GEMA in the name of GEMA Cultural Association (GCA) under the chairmanship of retired bishop Lawi Imathiu, has been going on since 2008 when the members of the Agikuyu tribe from both Central and Rift Valley regions, alarmed by the events of the 2007 post election violence between them and the Kalenjin and Luo tribes on the other hand, held a consultative meeting in Meru, but which turned chaotic after the Ameru community, which claimed not to have been involved in its planning, rejected its revival citing security concerns and the need for each community, to preserve its own identity and culture, to avoid domination and potential conflicts arising out of misunderstandings, due to the diversities of history, traditions, heritage and cultural norms. The Ameru categorically turned down the idea of forming Gema and warned its proprietors, against involving the Ameru in matters they didn't approve off.

== Etymology ==
A cross-section of Kikuyu politicians with their roots in Kiambu County launched Gema in the late 1960s when opposition to President Kenyatta's rule peaked, especially from Luo Nyanza following the 1966 falling out with his former ally and vice-president Jaramogi Oginga Odinga. The subsequent assassination of then Economic Planning Minister and Kanu Secretary General Tom Mboya in 1969 worsened matters.

In the backlash that resulted from the two events, central Kenya elite, including Njenga Karume and former Nakuru North MP Kihika Kimani, former Defence Minister Njoroge Mungai, former State Minister Mbiyu Koinange, and the president's nephew Ngengi Muigai felt there was a need for a central association bringing together the fractious Kikuyu. Gema was officially registered in 1971, with an economic arm called Gema Holdings that soon set out to acquire vast real estate, including an expansive farm at Kasarani and plots in the Nairobi Central Business District.

Virtually every other senior civil service and parastatal head from the region subscribed to Gema and President Kenyatta is said to have specifically ordered a hesitant Attorney General Charles Njonjo to immediately register the association that also enjoyed the patronage of Lands Minister Jackson Harvester Angaine who exercised considerable sway among the Meru. Others supporting the association included minister Jeremiah Nyagah, who was strategic in mobilising the Embu. Gema is accused of playing a prominent role in mobilising community support in the late 1960s and early 1970s, a period characterised by massive swearing of oaths throughout central Kenya for members to remain loyal to the Kenyatta regime.

But being composed mostly of educated and sophisticated elite, the association was, however, careful to present an image of disinterest in the illegal and divisive activity. With the Luo threat dissolved and most members toeing the line, Gema soon found its next target. Almost clocking ten years in the vice presidency, Daniel arap Moi was supposedly seen as a soft target for the hard-line Gema, which, having gone through the tougher motions of diffusing Jaramogi, Mboya and JM. But Njonjo, who was to be a hard nut to crack, in 1976 warned Gema heavyweights he would not hesitate to open treason charges against them for imagining the death of President Kenyatta.

The warning ended countrywide tours organised by Kihika, Mungai, Karume, Ngengi, and others who had been pushing a 'Change the Constitution' crusade to bar Moi from ascending to the presidency in the event of Kenyatta's death. When Mzee Kenyatta died in his sleep in 1978, Njonjo convened a Cabinet meeting in which Gema kingpins such as Koinange, Mungai, and Angaine had to watch their dream of retaining the presidency dissipate.

With the death of JM Kariuki and the scaring of Mwai Kibaki from the Kenyatta succession yarn around 1976, Gema insiders' vow of preventing the presidential standard from crossing River Chania had sort of come to pass as President Moi took over the reins of power. In 2003, the surviving Gema kingpins watched in horror as this vow was shattered and President Kibaki ascended to power in a competitive but peaceful transition. Moi had formally banned Gema in 1980 together with a plethora of tribal cocoons that run, among others, football teams.

Like the Abaluhya Football Club, which metamorphosed into AFC Leopards or the Luo Union, which was renamed Re-Union, Gema, the elite financial club, continued to function as Agricultural and Industrial Holdings Ltd, with among its properties being the Clay Works Factory on Thika Road and the surrounding ranch. This ranch has since been subdivided into plots and is now home to the fledgling middle class Clay Works Estate, straddling the Kasarani-Mwiki Road and Thika Road. Like the proverbial family hut in a Gikuyu compound, smoke rises from the thick chimneys at Clay Works Ltd daily.
