= Mbeere District =

Administrative district in Kenya

Coordinates: 0°34′N 37°37′E

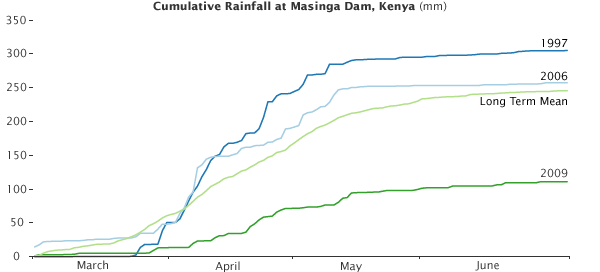
Cumulative rainfall at Masinga dam, Kenya.

Mbeere District was a former administrative district in the Eastern Province of Kenya. Its capital town was Siakago. The district had a population of 170,950 and an area of 2,093 km^{2}. The district was split from Embu District in 1996. In 2010, it was merged into Embu County.

The natives here, the Mbeere people, speak the Kimbeere language, a dialect of Kiembu . There is also a large chunk of peoples from the Akamba community mainly concentrated in the southern parts of the former district.

The former district hosts the famous seven folks dams, which include: Masinga dam, Kamburu dam, Gitaru dam, Kindaruma dam and Kiambere dam which it shares with Machakos County. The dams are a part of Tana River. Other local places of interest include the Mwea National Reserve, and Kiangombe mountain, which peaks at 1804 meters, stands out compared to adjacent topography, although is not as spectacular as the Mount Kenya located less than 100 kilometres northwest.

The dominant crops found here include mangoes, melons, pawpaws and passion fruits. Others include maize, beans, cowpeas, pigeon peas, black peas-njavi and millet which is seasonally grown. Mbeere district also came to be known with miraa, as it was the second largest producer after Meru. The miraa crop is commonly grown in what was the northern part of the district.

Mbeere district had only one local authority, Mbeere county council. The district had two constituencies: Siakago Constituency and Gachoka Constituency. The district was divided into four administrative divisions. More changes were expected with the split of the districts in year 2009; Mbeere South district whose headquarters is in Kiritiri town and Mbeere North district with headquarters in Siakago town.

Currently the constituencies have had their names changed from Gachoka to Mbeere South Constituency and from Siakago to Mbeere North Constituency.

Administrative divisions
Division	Population*	Urban pop.*	Headquarters
Gachoka	59,102	-	
Evurore	36,841	0-	
Mwea	40,680	-	
Siakago	34,330	2,312	Siakago
Total	170,953	--	-
* 1999 census
