= Mbeere people =

Ethnic group in Kenya

Mbeere
- Map of the population around Mount Kenya (in french)

Total population
- 195,250

Regions with significant populations
- Kenya

Languages
- Embu (Kīmbeere dialect) • Swahili • English

Religion
- African Traditional Religion • Christianity

Related ethnic groups
- Kikuyu, Embu, Meru, Kamba, Sonjo and Dhaiso

The Mbeere or Ambeere people are a Bantu ethnic group inhabiting the former Mbeere District in the now-defunct Eastern Province of Kenya. According to the 2019 Kenya National census, there are 195,250 Mbeere who inhabit an area of 2,093 km^{2}. They speak Kīmbeere language, a dialect of Embu, which is very similar to the languages spoken by their neighbours, the Kamba, Embu and Kikuyu.

== History ==
The Mbeere are of Bantu origin. Like the closely related Kikuyu, Embu, Meru and Kamba, they are concentrated in the vicinity of Mount Kenya. The exact place that Mbeere's ancestors migrated from after the initial Bantu expansion from West Africa is unclear. Some authorities suggest they arrived in their present Mount Kenya homeland from earlier settlements to the north and east, while others argue that the Mbeere – along with closely related Eastern Bantu peoples such as the Kikuyu, Embu, Meru and Kamba – moved into Kenya from further south.

== Economy ==
Most Mbeere are farmers who grow a variety of crops including mangoes, melons, pawpaws, passion fruits, maize, beans, cowpeas, pigeon peas, black peas, millet, sorghum, etc.

The former Mbeere District is known for miraa, of which it was the second largest producer after Meru County. The miraa crop is commonly grown in the northern part of the district. Apart from the Miraa and other farming activities, Mbeere District was known as the source of the building materials such as rocks, ballast, and sand used all over Kenya. Charcoal was also widely produced in Mbeere District. Other economic activities such basket making, ropes, and rearing animals such as cows and goats were also prevalent in the district.
