= Kivuti Maxwell =

Kenyan politician

Kivuti Maxwell is a Kenyan politician. He belongs to Safina and was elected to represent the Siakago Constituency in the National Assembly of Kenya since the 2007 Kenyan parliamentary election.
