= Siakago =

Town in Kenya

- Coordinates: 0°35′S 37°38′E
- Country: Kenya
- Province: Eastern Province
- County: Embu
- Constituency: Manyatta

Government
  - Representative: Muriuki Charles Njagagua

Population (1999)
  - Total: 34,330

Siakago is a town in Embu County, Kenya. It was previously the capital of the former Mbeere District in Eastern Province. It hosted the Mbeere county council and was also headquarters of Siakago Division in Mbeere District. In 1999, Siakago Division had a population of 34,330, of whom 2,312 were classified urban (1999 census.) Siakago is located 25 kilometres east of Embu town. The Kiangombe mountain lies just east of Siakago.

On November 6, 2010 Peter Karanja, an Administration Police officer, killed 10 people in a shooting spree.

The immediate former Member of Parliament for Siakago Constituency (now Mbeere North) is the Hon. Muriuki Charles Njagagua. The current member of parliament is Hon. Geoffrey Ruku, the tallest MP in the Kenyan Parliament, elected in the General Elections of 2022.
