= Kinoti Gatobu =

Kenyan politician

Honourable Kinoti Gatobu MP

Member of the Kenyan Parliament
- Incumbent
- Assumed office March 2013
- Constituency: Buuri
- Majority: 15,793

Personal details
- Born: c. 1986 (age 39–40) Kenya
- Party: Independent
- Relations: Married
- Education: University of Nairobi (BCom)
- Occupation: Freelance writer
- Positions: Editor, Unique Homes Magazine
- Nickname: Kijana (young man)

Boniface Kinoti Gatobu is a Kenyan politician who was elected as a member of the Kenyan Parliament in the 2013 parliamentary elections.

At 26, he was the youngest member of Kenya's 11th Parliament.

His grandfather was a squatter. His father, Moses Gatobu, a secondary school teacher, went to a simple high school (Miathene) in Meru; and his mother, Agnes Kinya Gatobu, joined a diploma teacher training college after giving birth to Kinoti, leaving him in the care of his Aunt, Gladys Njiiru. In 2017 December, he expressed his interest to vie for Gubernatorial seat in Meru County instead of parliamentary seat which he had held from 2013 to 2017. 3 days to national elections, he stepped down for his opponent, Governor Kiraitu Murungu. Currently, he does not serve in any governmental capacity. However, it is highly speculated that he is one of the president's advisors.
