= William Kamoti =

Kenyan lawyer and politician

William Kamoti was a Kenyan lawyer and politician who was a member of the 11th and 12th parliament elected from Rabai Constituency in Kilifi County on the ticket of Orange Democratic Movement (ODM) in 2013. He was the first MP of Rabai Constituency following its creation under the new constitution of Kenya. In the parliament, Kamoti was a member of the Departmental Committee on Justice and Legal Affairs. He sponsored 2014 Rabai Supper Cup football tournament to promote peace among his constituents.

Kamoti died on 29 May 2022 shortly after submitting his nomination for MP of Rabai Constituency to Independent Electoral and Boundaries Commission (IEBC) in a fatal auto crash. The accident occurred after the SUV he was travelling on lost control and tumbled several times killing Kamoti on the spot and left his driver with severe injury.
