= Kenya School of Law =

Bar school in Kenya

- Motto: Professional excellence for legal justice
- Established: 1963
- Director: Dr Henry Kibet Mutai
- Students: 1,900
- Location: Nairobi, Kenya; 1°21′41″S 36°44′49″E
- Website: www.ksl.ac.ke

The Kenya School of Law (KSL) is the only bar school in Kenya. After completing an undergraduate degree in law from a recognized university, students attend the Kenya School of Law to prepare for admission to the Kenyan Bar.

== History ==
The Kenya School of Law was established as a law vocational training school for the training of barristers in 1963. It was created by Gerald Davis, who served as a barrister under the patronage of Lord Justice Denning. Under the direction of Davis, the university flourished with many students going on to become prominent judges in both United Kingdom and Canada. However, the establishment of Faculties of Law in East African universities led to a need to change the training offered at the Kenya School of Law. After establishing the Kenya School of Law, Gerald Davis was appointed to run the Aberfan Disaster Fund in 1968. The fund stood at £2,000,000(over £40,000,000 as at 2024). Thereafter, he was appointed Judge in the UK and retired in 1986.

== Programs ==
The Kenya School of Law was re-established as in 1995 to provide the Advocates Training Program which focused on the preparation of young lawyers for entry into the legal profession. In 2005, a ministerial task force on the Development of a Policy and Legal Framework for Legal Education in Kenya expanded the mandate of the Kenya School of Law to include the following: Advocates Training, Continuing Professional Legal Development, Paralegal Training, the provision of Specialized Professional Legal Training in Public Service, Conducting of Projects and Consultancies and Research. The Council of Legal Education Act is the basis of legal training in Kenya.

=== Advocates Training Program ===
This is an eighteen-month course, with twelve months of classes and six months of pupilage. The courses cover civil litigation, criminal litigation, probate and administration, legal writing and drafting, trial advocacy, professional ethics and practice, legal practice management, conveyancing, and commercial transactions. The course is taught through a clinical approach, where problem questions are discussed in simulations, role plays, seminars and moot courts.

== KSL Thola Glass F.C. ==
The Kenya School of Law sponsors Kenya School of Law Thola Glass Football Club, commonly known as KSL Thola Glass or simply Thola Glass or Thola, which competes in FKF Division One, the second tier in the Kenyan football league system.

== Notable alumni ==
- Iddah Asin, lawyer and Johnson & Johnson executive
- Robert Gichimu Githinji, Member of Parliament
- Doreen Majala, lawyer and news personality from Mombasa
- Stephen Mogaka, Member of Parliament
