= Mount Kenya region =

Region in central part of Kenya

Mount Kenya region Eneo la Mlima Kenya (Sw) Murima
- Unofficial geo-political, cultural, and economic region
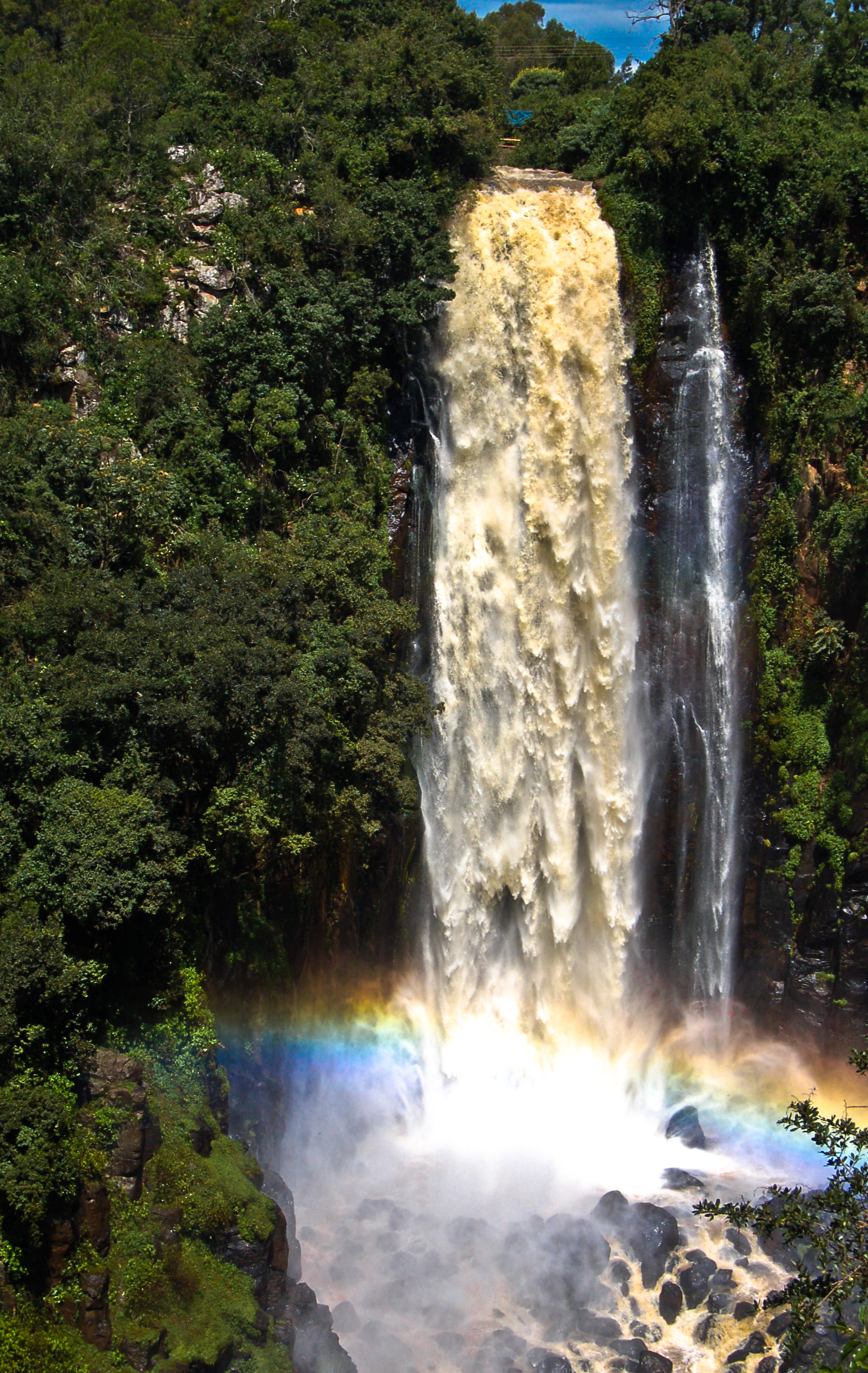
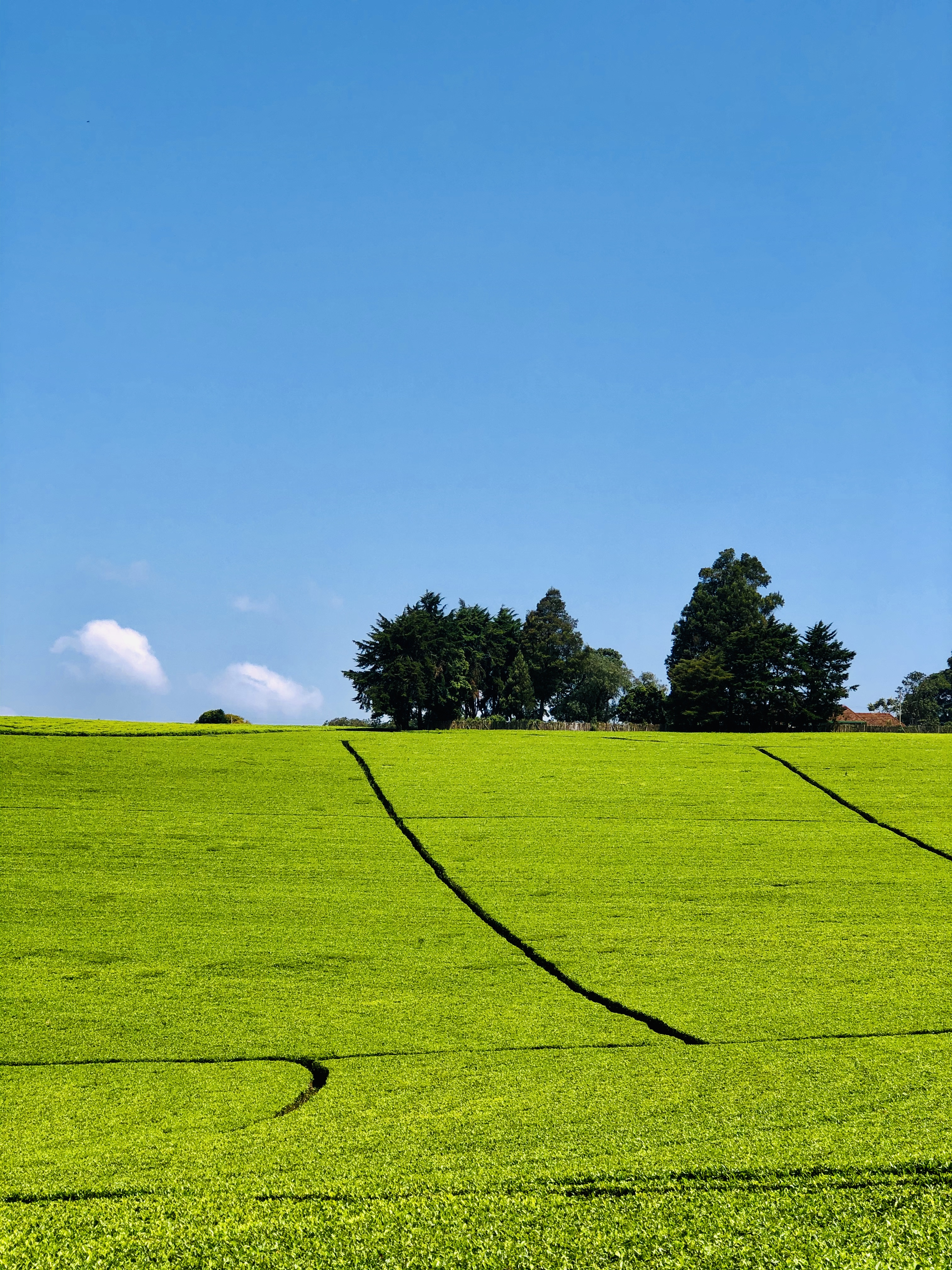
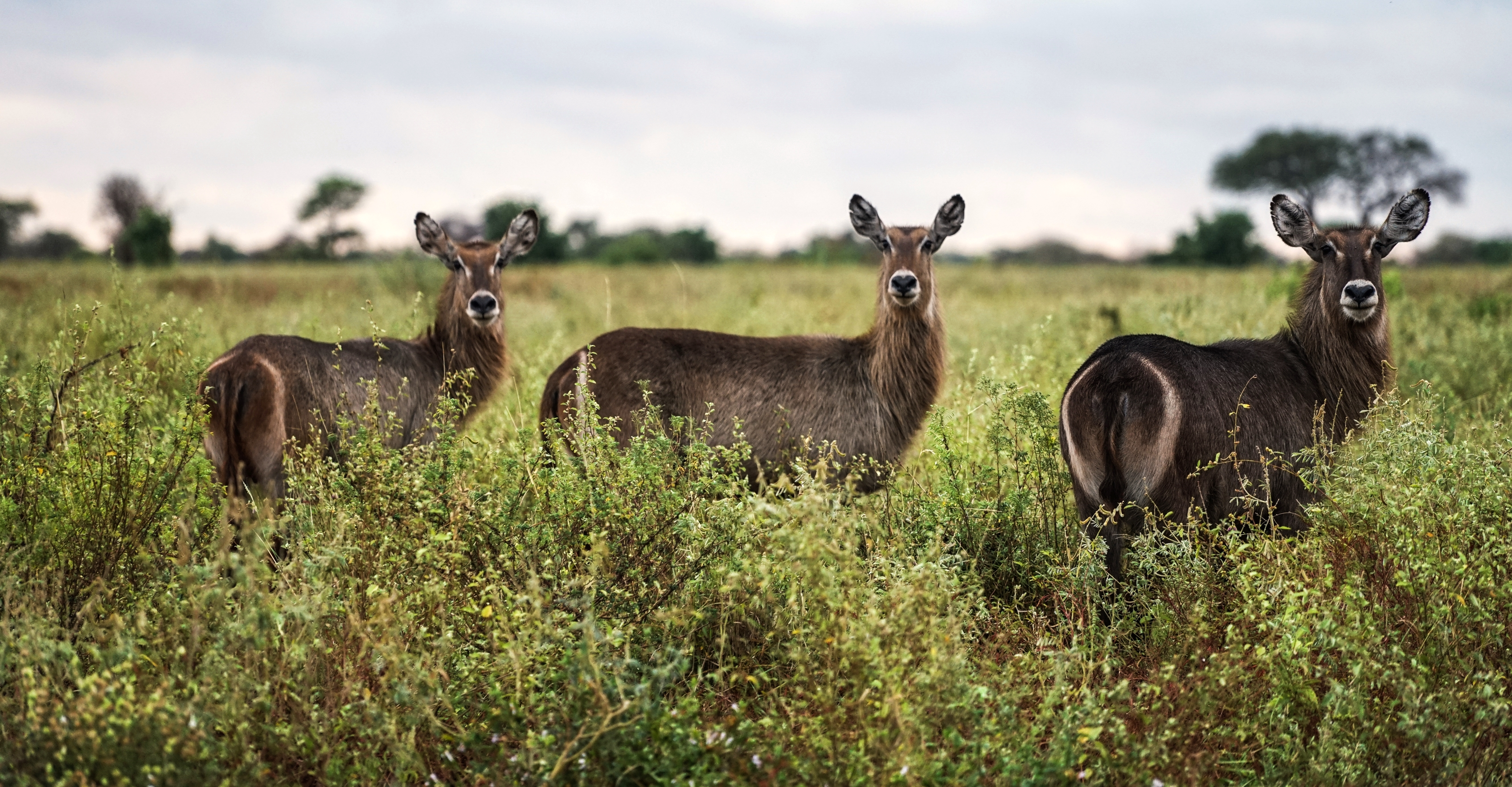
- Thika Highway ,Thompson Falls, Tea Farming in Limuru,Meru National park, Mt Kenya

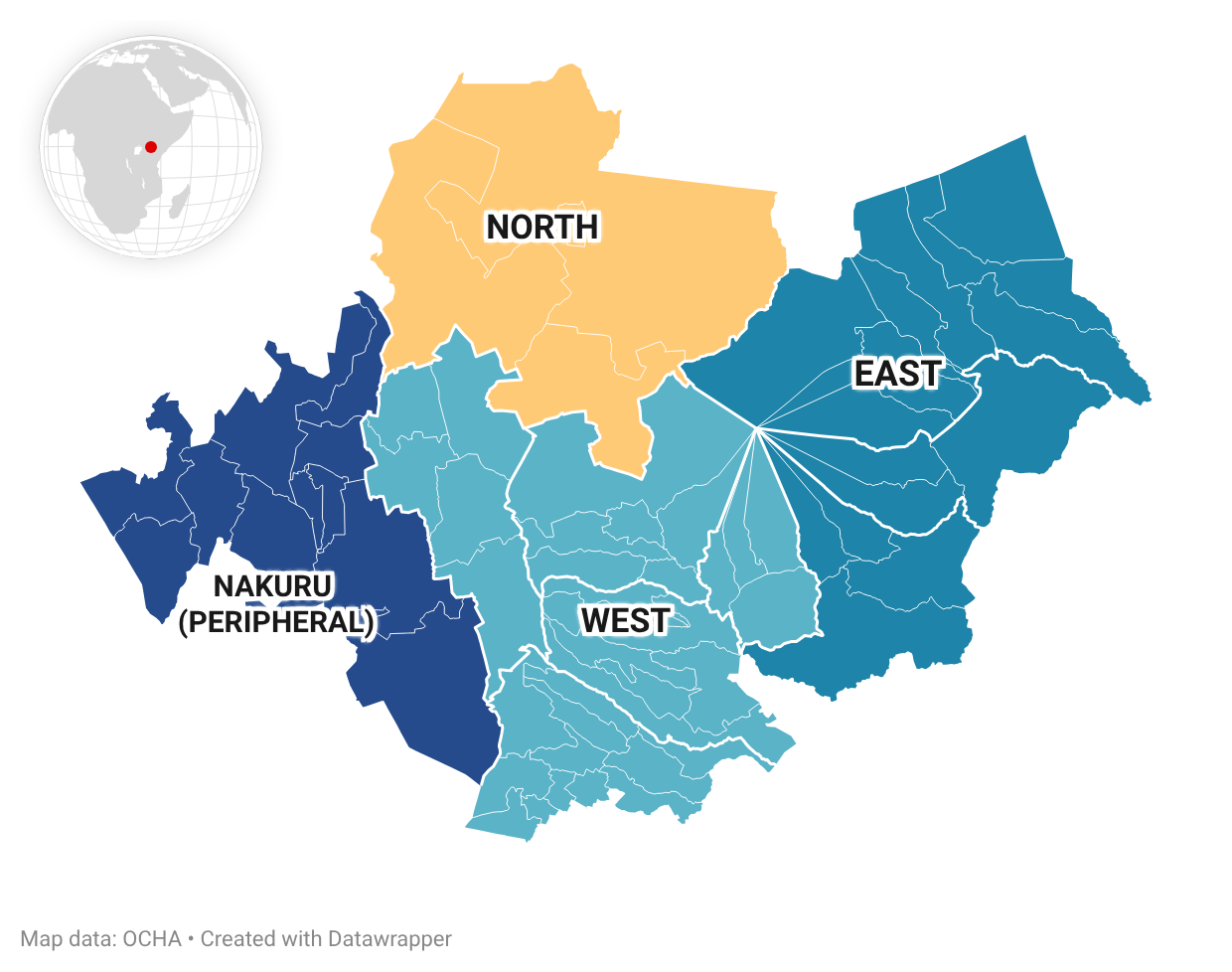
- Counties of the Mount Kenya region
- Country: Kenya
  - Counties of the region: Embu; Kiambu; Kirinyaga; Laikipia; Meru; Murang'a; Nakuru; Nyandarua; Nyeri; Tharaka-Nithi
  - Largest city: Nakuru City
  - Largest town: Thika

Area
  - Total: 34,069 km^{2} (13,154 sq mi)

Population (2019)
  - Total: 10.7 million
  - Estimate (2025): 11.9 million
  - Density: 251.6/km^{2} (652/sq mi)

GDP (PPP)
  - Total: ▲$64.41 billion (2024)
  - Per Capita: ▲$6,900 (2024)

GDP (NOMINAL)
  - Total: ▲$21.57 Billion (2024)
  - Per Capita: ▲$2,310 (2024)
- Time zone: UTC+3 (EAT)
- HDI (2023): ▲0.644: medium
- Data for the Mt Kenya region is an aggregate of individual county figures.

The Mount Kenya region, sometimes referred to as the Mt Kenya region, and referred to as Mlima in the Swahili language or Murima (meaning "The Mountain" in the Kikuyu language), is a geopolitical, cultural and economic area located in the central part of Kenya. The region is mostly centered around and named for Mount Kenya, the highest mountain in Kenya and the second-highest in Africa (after Mount Kilimanjaro).

It is generally considered to consist of 10 of the 47 counties of Kenya: Nyeri, Meru, Kirinyaga, Embu, Tharaka-Nithi, Kiambu, Murang'a, Laikipia, and Nyandarua, and Nakuru. The region is occasionally referred to as consisting of 9 counties, excluding Nakuru, which is sometimes considered as being either on the "periphery" of the Mount Kenya region or as belonging to the Great Rift Valley region. As of early 2026, the inclusion of Kiambu in this bloc has become a subject of political debate. A movement led by some Kiambu leaders has sought to distance the county from the "Mount Kenya" label.

As of 2025, the region has an estimated population of approximately 11.9 million people. The region's major urban centers include Nakuru City, Thika, and Ruiru.

While widely recognized in political discourse, it is not an official administrative or governmental unit under the 2010 Constitution, which recognizes only the national government and the 47 Counties of Kenya.

== Demographics ==
As of 2025, the population of the Mount Kenya region is estimated to be approximately 11.9 million. Kiambu County is the most populous county with, as of 2025, an estimated 2.7 million people, followed by Nakuru County with an estimated 2.4 million people, while Tharaka-Nithi has the smallest population at around 425,000 people. Tharaka-Nithi and Kirinyaga counties had the least population growth with 0.95% and 0.91% respectively.

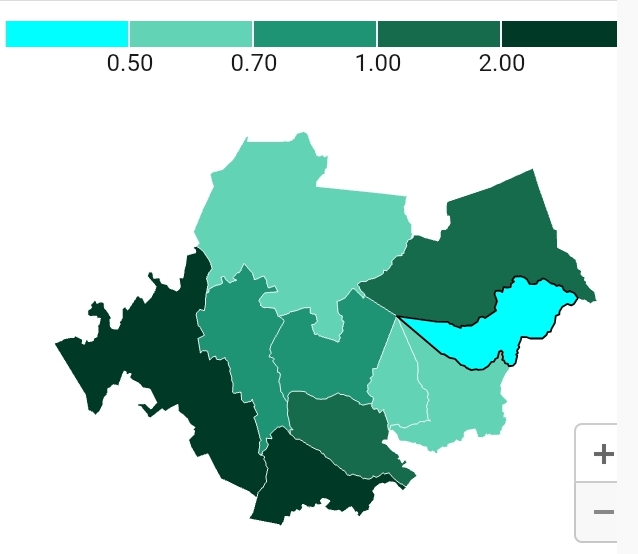
Regional population by county

Population in Mt Kenya (2020–2030) (in thousands)
	County	2020	2021	2022	2023	2024	2025	2030 (projection)
Mt Kenya Region		10,970	11,178	11,390	11,547	11,752	11,909	13,010
1	Kiambu	2,501	2,552	2,602	2,653	2,704	2,754	3,006
2	Nakuru	2,162	2,240	2,320	2,347	2,420	2,445	2,900
3	Meru	1,565	1,586	1,606	1,626	1,646	1,666	1,765
4	Murang'a	1,077	1,088	1,100	1,112	1,124	1,136	1,194
5	Nyeri	810	818	827	835	844	853	895
6	Kirinyaga	657	670	683	696	708	721	783
7	Tharaka-Nithi	403	408	412	416	421	425	446
8	Embu	629	635	642	648	655	662	692
9	Laikipia	529	539	550	561	572	583	639
10	Nyandarua	637	642	648	653	658	664	690

=== Religion ===
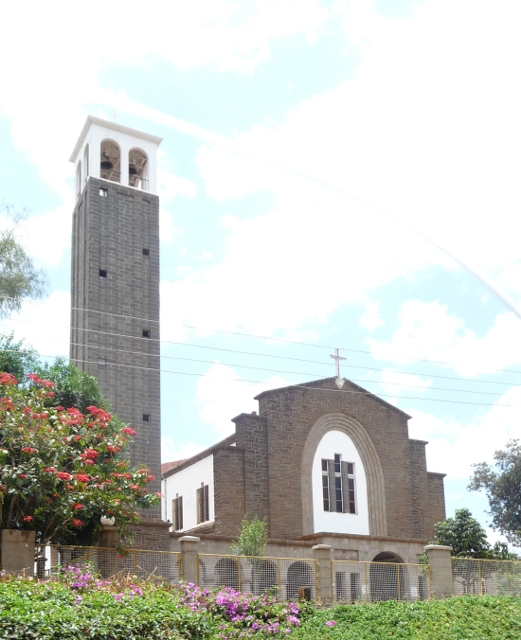
Nyeri Cathedral Church, Nyeri County

As per a 2019 survey, Christianity is the dominant religion within the Mount Kenya region with 96.29% identifying as Christian, 10.79 percentage points greater than Kenya nationally, at 85%. Protestantism was the largest denomination with around 35% being Protestants with Meru County and Tharaka-Nithi County having more than 40% Protestants. Catholicism is the second-largest denomination regionally, with around 26% followed closely by Evangelicalism at about 23%. Independent African churches of Christianity represented 8% of the regional population. Islam constitutes 0.67% of the population. Hindus constitute 0.04% of the regional population. All other religions constitute 1% of the population. 1.63% of the regional population identified as atheists; Nakuru County contained the highest percentage of atheists at 3.16% and Nyeri County contained the fewest, at 0.81%. 0.15% identified as agnostic. About 0.01% of the survey participants did not answer the question regarding their religious beliefs.

Religious affiliation within the Mount Kenya region
County	Christianity	Protestantism	Catholicism	Evangelicalism	African-initiated church	Eastern Orthodox Christianity	Other form(s) of Christianity	Islam	Hindu	Traditional African religions	Other religions	Atheists	"Don't know"	Not stated/no answer
Mount Kenya region	96.29%	35.10%	26.05%	22.75%	7.82%	0.56%	3.90%	0.67%	0.04%	0.23%	1.00%	1.63%	0.15%	0.012%
Embu	97.39%	36.62%	26.98%	22.71%	8.43%	0.60%	2.06%	0.47%	0.02%	0.06%	0.81%	1.14%	0.11%	0.01%
Kiambu	96.66%	36.74%	24.51%	21.86%	7.79%	0.74%	5.01%	0.89%	0.05%	0.13%	0.81%	1.28%	0.16%	0.02%
Kirinyaga	97.94%	39.73%	29.61%	20.19%	5.63%	0.38%	2.40%	0.40%	0.03%	0.04%	0.55%	0.92%	0.12%	0.01%
Laikipia	92.22%	29.71%	28.75%	21.15%	6.86%	0.32%	5.42%	1.65%	0.04%	1.39%	1.41%	3.05%	0.24%	0.01%
Meru	96.26%	40.06%	20.40%	23.82%	8.42%	0.62%	2.96%	0.82%	0.02%	0.13%	1.23%	1.37%	0.15%	0.02%
Murang'a	97.63%	39.42%	24.68%	19.70%	9.86%	0.49%	3.49%	0.35%	0.01%	0.09%	0.73%	1.09%	0.09%	0.01%
Nakuru	93.69%	16.31%	32.85%	30.23%	7.19%	0.57%	6.53%	1.19%	0.08%	0.21%	1.43%	3.16%	0.23%	0.01%
Nyandarua	95.94%	30.46%	17.13%	30.69%	11.15%	0.58%	5.92%	0.15%	0.01%	0.11%	1.38%	2.31%	0.09%	0.01%
Nyeri	97.75%	37.96%	27.95%	19.27%	9.09%	0.63%	2.84%	0.60%	0.02%	0.08%	0.61%	0.81%	0.13%	0.00%
Tharaka-Nithi	97.39%	44.02%	27.67%	17.90%	4.79%	0.68%	2.33%	0.19%	0.00%	0.06%	1.04%	1.14%	0.16%	0.02%

=== Human development ===
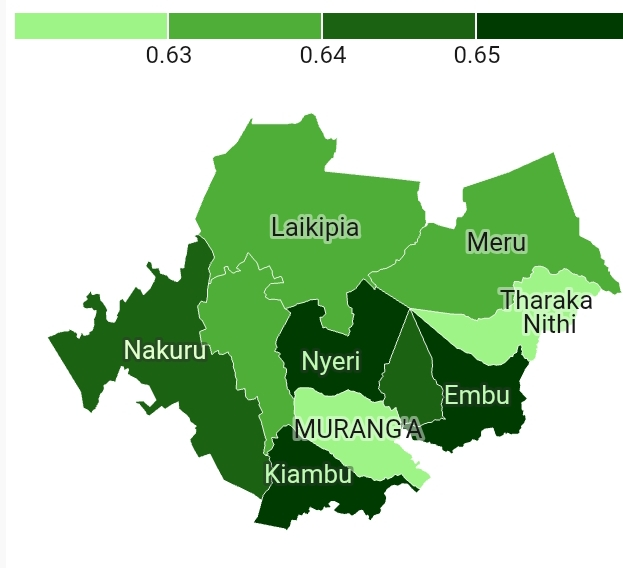
HDI of Mount Kenya region counties

As of 2023, the Human Development Index (HDI) of the Mount Kenya region is 0.643 which was higher than the national average of 0.601. Nyeri County, Kiambu County and Embu County are the most developed, all with an HDI exceeding 0.65, with Nyeri County being number-one regionally at 0.678. Murang'a County and Tharaka-Nithi County have the least human development with an HDI of around 0.62. Nakuru County is the median among the region's counties, at 0.641.

Rank	County	HDI
Mount Kenya region		0.643
1	Nyeri	0.678
2	Kiambu	0.663
3	Embu	0.650
4	Kirinyaga	0.646
5	Nakuru	0.641
6	Nyandarua	0.637
7	Laikipia	0.635
8	Meru	0.632
9	Tharaka Nithi	0.626
10	Murang'a	0.625

=== Age distribution ===
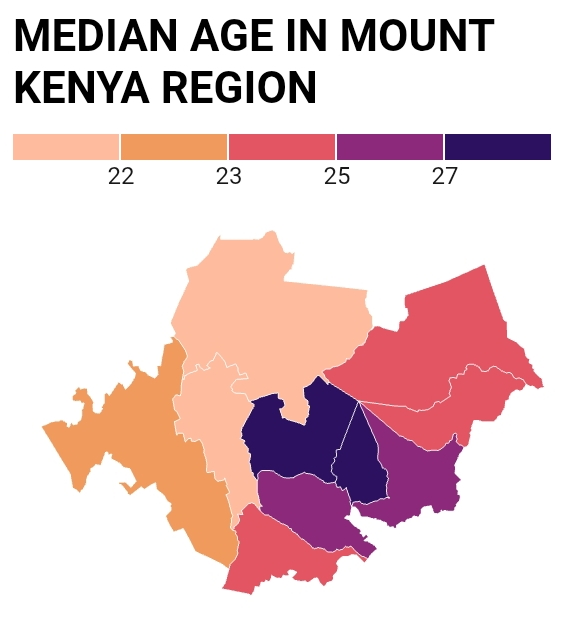
Median Age in Mount Kenya region

The median age of the Mount Kenya region is 24.5 which is the highest in the country. Nyeri County and Kirinyaga County have the highest median age of 27 years, followed by Embu County and Murang'a County with 25 years. Laikipia County and Nyandarua County have the least median age with a median age of 21 years. Central Mount Kenya region and East Mount Kenya region had the highest median age while Western and Northern Mount Kenya region had the lowest median age.

Rank	County	Median age
1	Nyeri	27.8
2	Kirinyaga	27.5
3	Embu	25.9
4	Murang'a	25.7
Mount Kenya (average)		24.5
5	Meru	23.9
6	Tharaka-Nithi	23.8
7	Kiambu	23.5
8	Nyandarua	21.8
9	Laikipia	21.1
Kenya Average		20.1

=== Urban Centers ===
Largest urban centres in Kenya
Rank	Name	Counties of Kenya	Pop.	Rank	Name	Counties of Kenya	Pop.
1	Nakuru	Nakuru County	809,825	11	Nyeri	Nyeri County	96,680
2	Ruiru	Kiambu County	695,513	12	Embu	Embu County	92,210
3	Kikuyu	Kiambu County	453,420	13	Wanguru	Kirinyaga County	73,397
4	Thika	Kiambu County	356,764	14	Githunguri	Kiambu County	63,319
5	Naivasha	Nakuru County	281,605	15	Murang'a	Murang'a County	61,465
6	Karuri	Kiambu County	275,784	16	Njoro	Nakuru County	59,846
7	Juja	Kiambu County	221,433	17	Kenol	Murang'a County	44,086
8	Kiambu	Kiambu County	209,838	18	Mairo Inya	Nyandarua County	43,320
9	Nanyuki	Laikipia County	103,327	19	Kerugoya	Kirinyaga County	39,779
10	Limuru	Kiambu County	99,094	20	Nyahururu	Laikipia County	35,589

== History ==
The Mount Kenya region has long been inhabited by a diverse mix of ethnolinguistic groups for centuries.

The Mount Kenya region has served as a cultural crossroads for centuries, with Cushitic-speaking groups (such as the ancestors of the Dahalo and the now-extinct Yaaku and Taita Cushites), Nilotic-speaking peoples (ancestors of the Kalenjin and Omotik) and later the Bantu groups arriving in waves from the 3rd century CE onwards. This resulted in a complex, intermingled history of migration, interaction, and assimilation, as these communities—including the Kikuyu, Meru, and Embu who established agricultural and trading systems while interacting with earlier hunter-gatherer groups like the Gumba and Athi. The extensive intermingling is evident in modern demographics, with groups like the Kikuyu showing significant genetic and cultural influence from both Cushitic and Nilotic ancestors.

Today the Mount Kenya area is home to predominantly the Kenyan Highland Bantu communities and some Nilotic groups such as the Maasai people, an Eastern Nilotic group, have historically interacted with these Bantu groups, particularly in the lower, drier slopes and surrounding plains, such as in Laikipia. The Gikuyu (Kikuyu), Embu, and Meru are Bantu-speaking peoples who settled in Kenya's central highlands following migrations from the northeast. While their oral tradition and beliefs trace spiritual roots to Mount Kenya (Kirinyaga), the mountain serves as a central landmark in a broader traditional cosmology. Significant settlement occurred between the 17th and 19th centuries, during which these groups adopted social structures like age set systems through interaction with Nilotic and Cushitic neighbors. Governance was maintained through these age-sets and councils such as the Njuri Ncheke and Kiama (the latter being a group related to a cultural rite of passage among the Kikuyu people). Traditional livelihoods of farming and herding were supplemented by 19th-century trade in ivory and hides.

=== Colonial history ===
In the late 19th century, Mount Kenya fell under British colonial control. Much of its fertile highland became part of the "White Highlands", displacing many local farmers to reserves. African political consciousness rose, and by the 1930s the Kikuyu, Embu and Meru communities began organizing through groups like the Kikuyu Central Association and later the Kenya African Union. This culminated in the Mau Mau uprising (1952–1960), an armed anti-colonial rebellion largely led by Kikuyu (with many Embu and Meru supporters) who hid in the forests of Mount Kenya and Aberdares. Thousands of "oathed" insurgents took refuge on Mt. Kenya, attacking settler farms and colonial outposts. The colonial government's brutal Emergency (villagization, detention camps) took a heavy toll on the local population. Notable figures from the region included Dedan Kimathi (Kikuyu freedom fighter executed by the British), Wangari Maathai (later Nobel laureate environmentalist from Nyeri), and Jomo Kenyatta (a Kikuyu leader from Kiambu who was imprisoned during the Emergency but became Kenya's first president in 1964).

== Geography ==
The mountain's steep altitude gradient creates distinct ecological zones. Montane forests (Juniperus, Podocarpus, and bamboo) cover the slopes up to about 2,500–3,000 m, above which dense bamboo zone and heathland ("Afro-alpine" heather and giant Lobelia) extend to ~4,000 m, and moorland tussock-grass plains occur up to ~5,000 m. Twelve small glaciers and about 20 tarns (alpine lakes) remain on the highest peaks, though they are rapidly retreating due to climate change. The lower slopes are drained by rivers (tributaries of the River Tana and River Ewaso Nyiro) and feed several reservoirs. For example, the Lewa Wildlife Conservancy in Laikipia County (north of Mount Kenya) and the Ngare Ndare Forest Reserve form part of the mountain's watershed system. These conservancies link the forested foothills of Mt. Kenya to the adjacent Laikipia plateau and Somalian/Maasai savanna ecosystem.

Mount Kenya and its surroundings are protected as a national park and forest reserve, a UNESCO World Heritage site for its outstanding natural beauty and biodiversity. The Mount Kenya National Park (managed by Kenya Wildlife Service) and the adjacent forest reserve (Kenya Forest Service) cover the highlands above ~2,000 m. They safeguard the mountain's unique flora and fauna (elephants, leopards, endemic rodents, alpine birds, etc.). Lower on the mountain are large tea and coffee farms (especially in Kiambu, Kirinyaga, and parts of Meru, Embu and Nyeri), as well as vast dairy pastures. As of the 2019 census, the ten Mt. Kenya counties ranged from very populous (Kiambu: 2,417,735 people; Nakuru: 2,162,202) to sparsely populated (Laikipia: 518,560). The table below summarizes 2019 population and area for each county in the region.

Counties of the Mt. Kenya Region (Ranked by Area)
Rank	County	Area (km^{2})	Population (2023 est.)	Population Density (per km^{2})
1	Laikipia	9,508	518,560	55
2	Nakuru	7,505	2,162,202	288
3	Meru	7,014	1,545,714	220
4	Nyeri	3,325	759,164	228
5	Nyandarua	3,286	638,289	194
6	Embu	2,821	608,599	216
7	Tharaka-Nithi	2,564	393,177	153
8	Kiambu	2,539	2,417,735	952
9	Murang'a	2,523	1,056,640	419
10	Kirinyaga	1,478	610,411	413
Total		42,563	10,710,491	252

Except for Kiambu and Nakuru counties, most of the region is predominantly rural. For example, Kiambu's urban population (1,706,785) far exceeds its rural (711,450), whereas Kirinyaga's rural residents (474,187) greatly outnumber its urban (136,224). Agriculture dominates the lower regions, with crops like tea (slopes of Kiambu, Kirinyaga, Nyeri, Tharaka Nithi) and coffee (Meru, Nyeri) as cash crops, plus maize, beans and horticulture. The region is also a dairy powerhouse (Meru alone produces ~200 million liters/year of milk) and contains projects like the Mwea irrigation settlement scheme (Kirinyaga).

== Economy ==
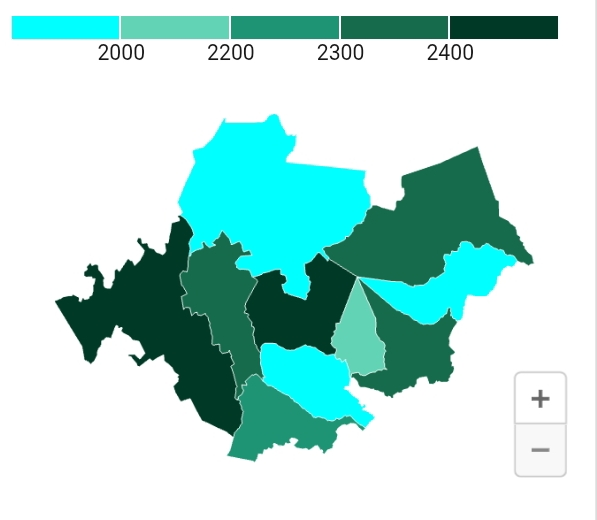
Mount Kenya Region by GDP per capita (nominal)

Agriculture is the backbone of the Mount Kenya economy. The fertile highlands produce tea, coffee, horticultural crops, and dairy on a large scale. With a total GDP of $26 billion, the region contributes around 22% to national GDP. Nakuru and Kiambu are the largest economies contributing around 23% each to the regional GDP. In terms of GDP per capita, Nakuru, Nyeri, Nyandarua and Embu lead with a nominal GDP of more than $7,000 at PPP as of 2023.

Regional economics (2024, USD billions)
Rank	County	GDP (Nominal)	GDP (PPP)	Per Capita (Nominal)	Per Capita (PPP)
Region average				2,248.3	6,650.4
1	Kiambu	6.36	18.99	2,351	7,016
2	Meru	4.08	12.18	2,476	7,389
3	Nakuru	5.13	13.98	2,233	6,080
4	Murang'a	2.29	6.84	2,041	6,090
5	Nyeri	2.22	6.63	2,635	7,862
6	Nyandarua	1.69	5.05	2,388	7,125
7	Embu	1.70	5.08	2,590	7,729
8	Kirinyaga	1.44	4.30	2,190	6,534
9	Laikipia	1.05	3.13	1,828	5,454
10	Tharaka-Nithi	0.74	2.21	1,751	5,225
Regional total		26.70	78.39		

== Politics ==
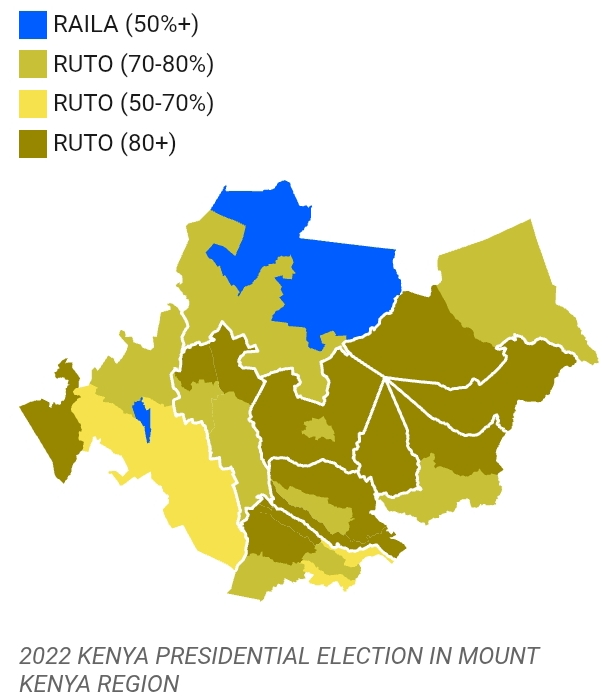
2022 Presidential elections results in Mount Kenya region

The Mount Kenya region is a major political force in Kenya due to its large voting population and cohesive voting patterns. It has historically been a stronghold of Central Kenya leadership – producing presidents Jomo Kenyatta (Kiambu), Mwai Kibaki (Nyeri), and Uhuru Kenyatta (Kiambu/Murang'a) – and commanding a bloc of electoral votes. Traditionally, Mt. Kenya counties have voted largely as a bloc for parties favored by Kikuyu elites, although splits have occurred (e.g. Ford-Asili in the 1970s, NARC in 2002). In the post-2010 era, new political formations emerged: for example, Kirinyaga's Martha Karua ran for president (2013) and became an opposition figure, while Meru leaders such as Peter Munya and Irungu Kang'ata have been influential in Jubilee and UDA administrations.

In the 2022 elections, the region swung behind William Ruto's Kenya Kwanza coalition (UDA party) against the traditional Azimio alliance. Issues like county development funds, coffee pricing, and land rights on the mountain frequently dominate local politics.

As of early 2026, the inclusion of Kiambu in this bloc has become a subject of political debate. A movement led by some Kiambu leaders has sought to distance the county from the "Mount Kenya" label.

== Notable people ==
- Jomo Kenyatta – First President of Kenya
- Wangari Maathai – Nobel Laureate & Environmentalist
- Kithure Kindiki - Current Deputy President of Kenya
- Dedan Kimathi – Mau Mau Leader
- Martha Koome - Chief Justice of Kenya
- Mwai Kibaki – Third President of Kenya
- Uhuru Kenyatta – Fourth President of Kenya
- Justin Muturi - Seventh Speaker of the National Assembly of Kenya and Eighth Attorney General of The Republic of Kenya
- Ngũgĩ wa Thiong'o – Novelist & Decolonization Advocate
- Musa Mwariama – Mau Mau Field Marshal
- Martha Karua – Politician & Former Justice Minister
- Rigathi Gachagua – Deputy President
- Simon Gicharu – Founder, Mount Kenya University
- Cecily Mutitu Mbarire – Second Governor of The County of Embu.
- Kubu Kubu – Mau Mau General.

== See also ==
- 2022 Kenyan Presidential Election in Mount Kenya Region
