= Kirinyaga =

Kirinyaga may refer to:

- Kirinyaga (novel), by Mike Resnick
- "Kirinyaga" (short story), a 1988 short story by Mike Resnick
- Kirinyaga Central Constituency
- Kirinyaga County, Kenya
- Kirinyaga District
- Kirinyaga University
- Mount Kenya
- Diocese of Kirinyaga
