= Kirinyaga District =

Former district of Kenya

Coordinates: 0°30′S 37°17′E

Kirinyaga District was an administrative district in the Central Province of Kenya. Its administrative centre is Kerugoya. As of 1999, the district had a population of 457,105 and an area of 1,478 km².

Kirinyaga District was historically part of Embu District until prior to independence when the colonial government made it its own district. In 2013, Kirinyaga District effectively disappeared and Kirinyaga County was effected as per the constitution of Kenya.

== History ==
Kirinyaga District was created in 1963 out of the western part of Embu District.

In 2007 new districts were created and Kirinyaga District was divided into four new districts: Kirinyaga Central with its administrative centre at Kerugoya; Kirinyaga East with its administrative centre at Kianyaga; Kirinyaga South with its administrative centre at Wanguru; and Kirinyaga West with its administrative centre at Baricho. Following a High Court ruling in September 2009, that there are only 46 legal districts in Kenya.

== Administration ==
The County Council of Kirinyaga administered all of Kirinyaga District, except the area administered by the Municipal Council of Kerugoya /Kutus and the Town council of Sagana-Kagio.

== Subdivisions ==
Kirinyaga District is divided as follows:

Local authorities (councils)
Authority	Type	Population*	Urban pop.*
Kerugoya/Kutus	Municipality	39,441	14,056
Sagana	Town	22,475	3,031
Kirinyaga	County	395,189	13,103
Total	-	457,105	30,190
* 1999 census. Source:

Administrative divisions
Division	Population*	Urban pop.*	Headquarters
Central	74,068	12,585	Kerugoya
Gichugu	121,738	1,988	Kianyaga
Mwea	125,962	7,625	Wanguru
Ndia	135,337	2,960	Baricho
Total	457,105	25,158	-
* 1999 census. Sources: , ,

The district has four constituencies:

- Mwea Constituency
- Gichugu Constituency
- Ndia Constituency
- Kirinyaga Central Constituency
