= Kimemia =

Kimemia is a name of Kenyan origin that may refer to:

- Francis Kimemia (born 1957), Kenyan civil servant currently Secretary to the Cabinet of Kenya
- Amos Kabiru Kimemia, former member of parliament from Nakuru County
- Josiah Munyua Kimemia, former member of parliament from Nyandarua County
