= Martha Karua =

Kenyan politician (born 1957)

Honourable Martha Karua EGH, SC
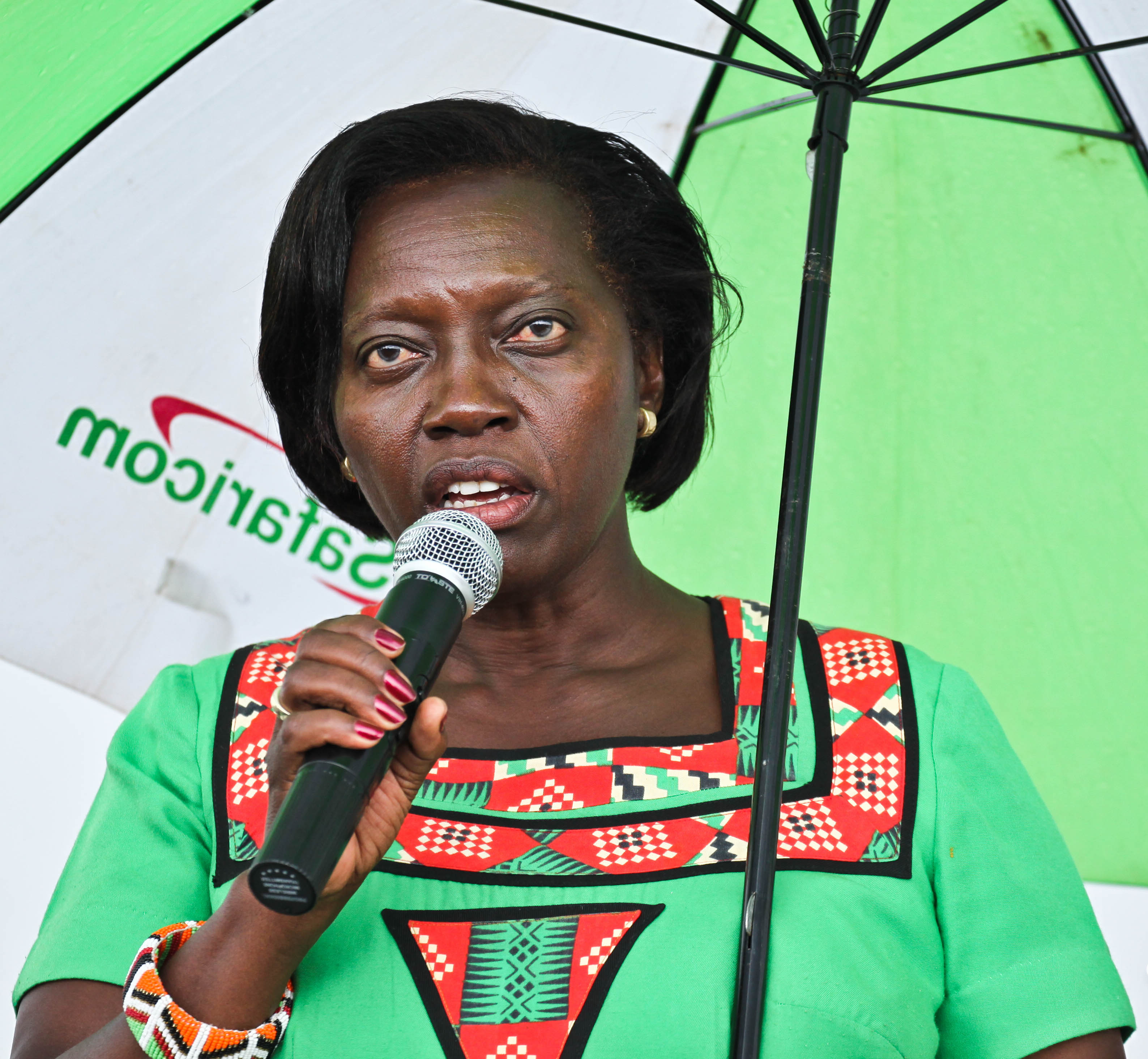

Minister for Justice, National Cohesion and Constitutional Affairs
- In office 7 December 2005 – 6 April 2009
- President: Mwai Kibaki
- Preceded by: Mwai Kibaki
- Succeeded by: Mutula Kilonzo

Minister for Water Resources Management and Development
- In office 3 January 2003 – 24 November 2005
- President: Mwai Kibaki
- Succeeded by: Mutua Katuku

Member of Parliament for Gichugu Constituency
- In office 26 January 1993 – 28 March 2013
- Preceded by: Geoffrey Karekia Kariithi
- Succeeded by: Ejidius Njogu Barua
- Constituency: Gichugu Constituency

Personal details
- Born: Martha Wangari Karua; 22 September 1957 (age 69) Gichugu District, Kenya
- Party: Ford–Asili (1992); Democratic Party (1992–2006); Narc–Kenya (2006–2025); [People's Liberation Party 2025 to Present]
- Other political affiliations: Azimio la Umoja (2022)
- Children: 2
- Education: University of Nairobi; United States International University - Africa
- Profession: Lawyer
- Positions: Partner, Martha Karua & Co. (1987–2002)
- Website: www.joinmarthakarua.com

Martha Wangari Karua (/wænˈɡɑːri kəˈraʊ/; born 22 September 1957) is a Kenyan politician. She is a former long-standing member of parliament for Gichugu Constituency and an Advocate of the High Court of Kenya. She was Minister for Justice until resigning from that position in April 2009. She has consistently fought for the protection of women's rights and improvements to the democratic process.

Karua ran for presidency in 2013 under the Narc-Kenya ticket making her the third woman to run for the highest office, after Charity Ngilu and Wangari Maathai in the 1997 elections. She emerged sixth in the race. She was picked to run for deputy president after being nominated as the running mate of presidential candidate Raila Odinga in the 2022 Kenyan general election. Karua later rebranded NARC Kenya to the People's Liberation Party (PLP) in February 2025.

== Early life and education ==
The daughter of Jackson Karua and his wife Josephine Wanjiru, Martha Karua was born on 22 September 1957 in the then larger Embu District (later Kirinyaga District) in the Central Province of Kenya. Brought up in the village of Kimunye in Gichugu Constituency, she is the second child in a family of eight, four girls and four boys.

She attended Mugumo primary school, Kabare Girls Boarding School, St Michael's boarding school Keroguya. She later attended Kiburia Girls Secondary School, Ngiriambu Girl's secondary school, and Karoti Girl's secondary schools where she passed her East African School Certificate at Karoti Girls High School in Kirinyaga County. She then attended Nairobi Girl's secondary school for A levels. She studied law at the University of Nairobi from 1977 to 1980. Between 1980 and 1981 she was enrolled at the Kenya School of Law for the statutory postgraduate law course that is a prerequisite to admission to the Kenyan roll of advocates and licensing to practice law in Kenya.

== Legal career ==
After graduating, from 1981 to 1987 Karua worked as a magistrate in various courts including those at Makadara, Nakuru and Kibera, receiving credit for careful discernment. In 1987, she left to start her own law firm, Martha Karua & Co. Advocates, which she ran until 2002. Cases included the treason trial of Koigi Wamwere and that of the Kenyan member of parliament Mirugi Kariuki. At the risk of being blacklisted by the Moi government, she defended several human rights activists. Her work contributed to family law, especially in regard to matrimonial property.

Karua has also represented opposition figures in other African countries, including Kizza Besigye in Uganda, and Tundu Lissu in Tanzania. On 18 May 2025, Karua was arrested and deported upon arrival at Julius Nyerere International Airport in Dar es Salaam to represent Tundu Lissu in court.

== Political career ==
=== 1990–2002 ===
Karua was a member of the opposition political movements that successfully agitated for the re-introduction of multi-party democracy in Kenya in the early 1990s. Kenya was at the time under the authoritarian rule of the Kenya African National Union (KANU), the only legally recognised political party in Kenya and which was led by the late president Daniel arap Moi.

Karua joined Kenneth Matiba's Ford-Asili party. In September 1992, she walked out of the party nomination elections which she regarded as compromised leaving her sole opponent Geoffrey Karekia Kariithi to be declared winner. She joined the Democratic Party (DP) where she won the party ticket in November 1992, proceeded to win the election as Gichugu Constituency member of Parliament in December 1992 against the incumbent Kareithi, freeing Gichugu constituents from the Kareithi–Nahashon Njuno rivalry. Karua became the MP for Gichugu constituency and the first woman lawyer to be popularly elected to Parliament. She was elected as the Democratic party's legal affairs secretary in 1993.

In 1998, Karua declined the position of Shadow Minister for Culture and Social Services which conflicted with her position of National Secretary for Constitutional Affairs (an elected office) that made her the official spokesperson on legal matters of the party. She opted to resign her position as the National Secretary for legal and constitutional Affairs.

In 2001, when the Constitutional Review Bill was laid before the House, the entire Opposition with the exception of Karua walked out of Parliament. The Bill had been rejected by the Opposition as well as Civil Society but Karua was of the view that as elected representatives, instead of walking out, it would be more prudent to remain in Parliament and put the objections on record. She therefore chose to remain in the Parliament and her objections to the Bill were duly recorded in the Hansard.

Later she was among those who formed the political coalition NARC that won the 2002 general election in Kenya ending KANU's nearly four decades of leadership in Kenya's politics, having actively participated in agitation for expanded democratic space and respect for human rights as a member and later a leader in the Law Society of Kenya.

=== 2003–2009 ===
Until 6 April 2009 she was the Minister of Justice, National Cohesion & Constitutional Affairs. She also previously served as the Minister of Water Resources Management & Development, and was behind the implementation of the Water Act 2002, which has since then accelerated the pace of water reforms and service provision in Kenya.

Karua remained Justice and Constitutional Affairs Minister in the Cabinet appointed by Kibaki on 8 January 2008, following the controversial December 2007 election. In an interview with BBC's HARDtalk in January 2008, Karua said, regarding the violent crisis that had developed over the election results, that while the government had anticipated that the opposition Orange Democratic Movement (ODM) of Raila Odinga might be "planning mayhem if they lost", it was surprised by "the magnitude" of it, calling the violence "ethnic cleansing". Asked to clarify, Karua said that she was stating "categorically" that the ODM planned ethnic cleansing. Odinga subsequently called Karua's accusation "outrageous". Karua headed the government's team in negotiations with the opposition regarding the political dispute that resulted from the election. The political crisis eventually led to the signing of a power-sharing agreement between Kibaki and Odinga. In the grand coalition Cabinet that was announced on 13 April 2008, Karua remained in her post as Minister of Justice, National Cohesion and Constitutional Affairs.

She was endorsed as the national chairperson of the NARC-Kenya political party on 15 November 2008. There was virtually no competitive election during the party's national delegates' convention at the Bomas of Kenya in Nairobi as all the officials including Ms Karua were being endorsed. After her endorsement she immediately declared she would be gunning for the highest political seat that being President in the Kenya's 2012 elections.

Karua resigned as Minister of Justice and Constitutional Affairs on 6 April 2009, citing frustrations in discharging her duties. A clear example of her frustrations was when President Mwai Kibaki appointed Judges without her knowledge a few days before her resignation. She was the first Minister to resign voluntarily since 2003.

=== 2013–present ===
Karua contested the 2013 Kenyan presidential election, under the NARC Kenya party ticket. New Kenyan law barred presidential contenders from simultaneously seeking a parliamentary seat, so she had to give up her interest in her somewhat safe Gichugu seat, with potential risk of being cast out of politics altogether (if she lost her presidential bid). She came in sixth with 43,881 votes in a contested election outcome.

Martha Karua would make a come-back in Kenya's political scene in the 2017 general election seeking for a gubernatorial seat in Kirinyaga County. She lost to Anne Waiguru in a heavily contested election after garnering 122,091 votes against Waiguru's 161,373 votes. Karua contested the election citing election irregularities and filed a petition at the High Court seeking to have Waiguru's election nullified, losing the petition at the High court through Court of Appeal and ultimately at the Supreme Court. Karua proceeded to file a petition in the East African Court of Justice, suing Kenyan government for failure of its Judicial arm to dispense justice in the petition. She was among the opposition leaders who US President Barack Obama met when he was hosted by Uhuru Kenyatta in 2015 in Obama's only presidential visit to Kenya. Politically, she seems to have inclined toward CORD, the main opposition political outfit led by Raila Odinga. Karua later abandoned her political relationship with Raila and supported Jubilee Party ahead of the 2017 Kenyan general election.

In December 2015 Karua admitted to receiving a Ksh 2 million donation to her presidential campaign costs from British American Tobacco. Karua said that she thought that the contribution by Paul Hopkins, a BAT employee, was a personal donation. The money was paid via Mary M'Mukindia who was running Karua's campaign. Karua has the reputation of being untainted by corruption save for this report of donation of alleged tainted money. No culpability has been proven and the British investigations concluded without any charges against Paul Hopkins. Karua has maintained that she cannot be corrupted and invited Kenyan authorities to investigate any alleged wrongdoing.

On 20 September 2021, Karua was unanimously elected as the Interim Mount Kenya Unity Forum Spokesperson by a section of leaders from Central Kenya.

We have chosen Martha Karua to be our official convener and our spokesperson

— Gatundu South MP Moses Kuria.

=== 2022 general election ===
On 3 June 2022, presidential candidate Raila Odinga named Karua as his running mate making her the first woman in Kenyan history to run for a political ticket of a major political party. This meant that a win for Odinga's Azimio la Umoja–One Kenya Coalition Party in August 2022 would have made her the first Kenyan woman Deputy President, and the highest ranking Kenyan woman in history.

=== Reputation ===
At one time in her Kirinyaga District when KANU was still in power, Karua walked out on President Moi who was then addressing a crowd at the district's stadium. This was an unusual display of open defiance against Moi, who was then feared and ruled the country as an authoritarian.

She has been an activist for the widening of democratic space and gender issues in Kenya. She has been involved in championing women's rights through public interest litigation, lobbying and advocacy for laws that enhance and protect women's rights. This was through her work with various women's organizations, particularly the International Federation of Women Lawyers (FIDA-Kenya) and the League of Kenya Women Voters.

Karua is part of the legal team for the Ugandan opposition politician Kizza Besigye. On 22 June 2026, she was arbitrarily detained at Entebbe International Airport before being forcibly deported from Uganda.

== Awards and recognition ==
In 1991, Karua was recognized by Human Rights Watch as a human rights monitor.

In December 1995, she was awarded by the Federation of Kenya Women Lawyers (FIDA) for advancing the cause of women. In 1999 the Kenya Section of the International Commission of Jurists awarded her the 1999 Kenya Jurist of the Year and in the same year same month, the Law Society of Kenya (LSK) awarded her the Legal Practitioners Due Diligence Award.

== Publications ==
Against The Tide ISBN 9789966690845
