= Daniel Waithaka =

Kenyan politician

Daniel Waithaka Mwangi

1st Governor of Nyandarua County
- Incumbent
- Assumed office 27 March 2013
- Succeeded by: Francis Kimemia

Personal details
- Party: TNA Now Jubilee Party of Kenya
- Education: University of Nairobi ( BCom)
- Profession: entrepreneur, accountant

Daniel Waithaka Mwangi served as the previous governor of Nyandarua County in central Kenya from 2013 to 2017. He was chosen during the 4 March 2013 general elections in Kenya.

== Personal life ==
Daniel Waithaka owns Elite School in Nyahururu and he a Bachelor of Commerce degree from the University of Nairobi as well as CPS and CPA certificates.

== Accountancy ==
Mr. Waithaka Mwangi joined the Ministry of Co-operative Development in 1972 as a lecturer at the Co-operative College, Karen after earning his degree from the University of Nairobi.

Later, he became an auditor working in both Nairobi and Nakuru for the Bell House Mwangi group of auditors.

He also worked as the Chief Accountant at Longman (K) Ltd (now Longhorn Publishers) and as an accountant in charge of the tea factories at the Kenya Tea Development Authority (now Agency).

== Politics ==
Daniel Waithaka first got involved in electoral politics in 2007 when he ran for the Mazingira Greens Party nomination for the Ol Kalou parliamentary seat.

Erastus Mureithi of the PNU Coalition triumphed over him.

In 2012, he entered politics once more and won the Nyandarua governor's race for the Jubilee coalition party TNA.

== Governor Election 2013 ==
He emerged victorious during the election after defeating former Kinangop MP Mr David Ngugi and Mr Peter Gathimba.

Candidate	Party	Votes	Comment
Daniel Waithaka Mwangi	TNA	162,418	Winner
David Mwaniki Ngugi	GNU	19,561	
Peter Mwangi Gathimba	NARC	55,896	
Rejected votes		2,313	
Total votes cast		240,188	
