= Kinangop Constituency =

Kenyan electoral constituency

Kinangop
- constituency for the Parliament of Kenya
- Kinangop Constituency within Nyandarua County

- Nyandarua County within Kenya
- County: Nyandarua
- Population: 111,410
- Area: 294 km^{2} (113.5 sq mi)

Current constituency
- Number of members: 1
- Party: JP
- Member of Parliament: Zachary Thuku Kwenya
- Wards: 8

Kinangop Constituency is an electoral constituency in Kenya. It is one of five constituencies in Nyandarua County. The constituency has five wards, all of which elect Members of County Assembly (MCA's) for the Nyandarua County. The constituency was established for the 1988 elections.

It is not to be confused with Kinango Constituency located in Kwale County.

Main ethnic group: Kikuyu

Main economic activity: Agriculture (Dairy and crop farming)

Main crops: Irish potatoes, Cabbages, Carrots, Fruits, Kales, Wheat, Barley

Main dairy companies: KCC, Tuzo, Brookside, Kinangop dairies and other small dairy companies

== Members of Parliament ==
| Elections | MP | Party | Notes |
|---|---|---|---|
| 1983 | Kabingu Wa Muregi | KANU | One-party System |
| 1988 | Josiah Munyua Kimemia | KANU | One-party system. |
| 1992 | Mary Wanjiru | Ford-Asili | |
| 1997 | Mwangi K.Waithaka | Ford-People | |
| 2002 | Mwangi K.Waithaka | NARC | |
| 2007 | David Mwaniki Ngugi | Sisi Kwa Sisi | |
| 2013 | Stephen Mburu (k.k) | TNA | |
| 2017 | Zachary Kwenya Thuku | Jubilee Alliance Party | |
| 2022 | Zachary Kwenya Thuku | Jubilee Alliance Party | |

== Wards ==
| Ward Number | Ward | Population (2009 Census) | Registered Voters (2012) | Area (Sq. KM) |
|---|---|---|---|---|
| 0441 | Engineer | 26,977 | 11,748 | 118.80 |
| 0448 | Magumu | 25,638 | 10,530 | 53.80 |
| 0445 | Njabini | 20,665 | 9,288 | 98.90 |
| 0442 | Gathara | 26,656 | 13,177 | 109.90 |
| 0444 | Murungaru | 26,920 | 12,572 | 164.80 |
| 0443 | North Kinangop | 20,898 | 8,388 | 134.70 |
| 0447 | Githabai | 19,485 | 8,502 | 107.70 |
| 0446 | Nyakio | 25,140 | 11,360 | 146.10 |
| | Total | 192,379 | 85,563 | 934.7 |
