= David Mwaniki Ngugi =

Kenyan politician

David Mwaniki Ngugi is a Kenyan politician. He belonged to Sisi Kwa Sisi and was elected to represent the Kinangop Constituency in the National Assembly of Kenya since the 2007 Kenyan parliamentary election. He currently belongs to the Grand National Union and is a candidate for the governor of Nyandarua in the 2013 general elections.

He appeared before the Akiwumi Commission in March 2009 and vouched his support for the current MP remuneration package. He also supports the idea of annual increase in pay for members of parliament, which he claims will be an incentive to attract skills and talent to the house.
