= Robert Gichimu Githinji =

Kenyan lawyer and politician

The Honourable Robert Gichimu Githinji MP

Member of Parliament for Gichugu
- Incumbent
- Assumed office 8 August 2017
- Preceded by: Ejidius Njogu Barua

Personal details
- Party: United Democratic Alliance (since 2022)
- Other political affiliations: Jubilee Party (2017–2022); Grand National Union of Kenya (until 2017)
- Education: University of Nairobi (LL.B); Kenya School of Law

Robert Gìchimū Gìthìnji is a Kenyan lawyer and politician who has served in the National Assembly of Kenya since 2017, representing the Gichugu Constituency.

== Career ==
Gìthìnji attended the University of Nairobi from 1995 until 1999, graduating with a Bachelor of Law degree. In 2000, he received a Diploma in Law from the Kenya School of Law. In 2001, Gìthìnji was admitted to the Kenyan Bar, and he began his law practice as an advocate of the High Court of Kenya.

In the 2013 Kenyan general election, Gìthìnji ran for the National Assembly of Kenya, contesting the Gichugu Constituency in Kirinyaga County as a member of the Grand National Union of Kenya. However, Gìthìnji was defeated by Ejidius Njogu Barua of The National Alliance, receiving 20,192 votes compared to Barua's 24,839. In the 2017 Kenyan general election, Gìthìnji joined the newly-formed Jubilee Party and ran again for the same constituency. Though he faced two opponents, Gìthìnji was easily elected, receiving 68,521 votes out of a total of 74,255 votes cast. During this term, Gìthìnji served on the Committee on Trade, Industry and Cooperatives and the Committee on Selection.

Gìthìnji successfully ran for re-election in the 2022 Kenyan general election as a member of the United Democratic Alliance, defeating nine opponents and receiving 33,889 votes. In 2024, Gìthìnji declared his intent to table any amendments to a Constituency Development Fund act which sought to separate bursary awards from other allocations, in order to ensure all constituencies receive equal bursaries in response to a drop-out crisis in urban schools.
