= Shamata =

Constituency ward in Nyandarua County, Kenya

Coordinates: 0.116665°S 36.550005°E

Shamata is a ward in Ndaragwa Constituency of Kenya's Nyandarua County. It is located approximately 222 kilometres (138 mi) from Nairobi.

Shamata Town is located 34 km (21 mi) from Nyahururu and 28 km (17 mi) from Maili-inya, which is only 3.2 kilometres (2 mi) from the Thomson Falls. The area is home to resources such as the Aberdare National Park and Lake Ol'Bolossat. The lake is known for its hippopotamus population.

== Agriculture ==
Shamata is among the most agriculturally productive areas in Kenya. It is known for the production of potatoes, milk, cabbages, peas and pyrethrum in the past.

== Education ==
Schools in the area include Shamata girls high school, Kaheho mixed day secondary school, Lake Olbolosat secondary school that reached the final of the Kenya National Secondary Schools games in 2018 and the semi-finals in 2019, Horizon Hope Academy, Lake View Academy, Mwihang'ia primary school, Itonyero primary school, Simbara primary and secondary schools, Warukira primary school, and others.

== Tourism ==
The area is a tourism hub as it is surrounded by the great Aberdare ranges on one side and Lake Ol'Bolossat on the other. The Aberdare ranges have a variety of animals including the "big five": elephant, lion, leopard, rhinoceros, and buffalo, as well as the cheetah and giraffes. Lake Ol'Bolossat has hippos and unusual birds.
