= John Ngata Kariuki =

Kenyan politician and businessman

John Ngata Kariūki is a Kenyan politician and businessman. He has two children. His wife, Rose Wanjikū Kariūki (educationalist and economist), died in 2015.

He is the Chairman of Sarova Hotels. In 2000, he founded the Ngata Children's Home in Kìrìnyaga

At the 2007 parliamentary elections, he won the Kirinyaga Central Constituency parliamentary seat on FORD-Asili ticket.

However, he lost the seat for Kìrìnyaga central after a court petition filed by Daniel Karaba (Narc-Kenya). Kariūki decided not to defend his seat at the subsequent by-election, where Karaba lost to the PNU candidate Joseph Gitari.

He has served as Non-Executive Chairman and Director in several companies including Kenya Airways, Kenya National Assurance, the Automobile Association of Kenya, the Kenya Post & Telecommunications Corporation (Telkom Kenya) and as a member of the Advisory Committee of the Bank of India.

Kariūki is the second son of Japhet Kariūki Kanyotu. His elder brother is the late James Kanyotu (Kenya's first Director of Intelligence).
