= Kirinyaga University =

Public university in Kutus, Kenya

- Other name: KYU
- Former names: Kirinyaga Technical Institute, Kirinyaga University College.
- Motto: Innovative technology for a dynamic world
- Type: Public
- Established: 2011
- Chairman: Dr. Mechah Charles Moturi
- Vice-Chancellor: Prof. Mary Wambui Ndung’u
- Location: Kutus, Kirinyaga County, Kenya
- Website: kyu.ac.ke

Kirinyaga University is a public university situated in Kutus Kerugoya in Kirinyaga County, Kenya.along the Sagana-Embu Highway approximately 115km northeast of Nairobi.

== History ==
The university has its roots in the Kirinyaga Technical Institute. In 2012 it became a constituent college of the Jomo Kenyatta University of Agriculture and Technology and was renamed Kirinyaga University College. In October 2016 the university was granted the charter to operate as administratively independent university by the president of Kenya Uhuru Kenyatta among eight other universities. After becoming chartered, senior counsel Fred Ojiambo was appointed as chancellor and Prof. Mary Ndung'u as vice chancellor.

== Schools ==
Kirinyaga University has five faculties:

- School of Health Sciences
- School of Pure and Applied Sciences
- School of Hospitality and Textile Technology
- School of Engineering and Technology
- School of Business and Education

== See also ==
- Maasai Mara University
