= Erastus Kihara Mureithi =

Kenyan politician

Honorable Erastus Kihara Mureithi

Member of Parliament for Ol Kalou
- In office 2007–2013
- Preceded by: Karue Muriuki
- Succeeded by: David Njuguna Kiaraho

Personal details
- Born: 17 November 1946 (age 79)
- Party: Agano Party of Kenya (since 2013)
- Other political affiliations: Party of National Unity (formerly)
- Occupation: Politician
- Known for: Business entrepreneurship, corporate leadership

Erastus Kihara Mureithi is a Kenyan politician. He belongs to the Agano Party of Kenya, and while a member of Party of National Unity was elected to represent the Ol Kalou Constituency in the National Assembly of Kenya since the 2007 Kenyan parliamentary election. He vied in 2013 and 2017 and lost both elections.

== Background and Education ==
Hon Mureithi has a Masters of Arts degree in Counselling Psychology from the United States International University (Africa) San Diego, California; a Master’s degree in Agricultural Economics (Agrarian Development Overseas), University of London (Wye College); and a Bachelor of Science degree in Agriculture (Agronomy), Makerere University in Kampala, Uganda.

In his career before entering into politics in the 2000s, Hon Mureithi served in several civil service positions. He served as a Senior Agriculture Officer from 1976 to 1979, and the Assistant Director of Agriculture from 1979-1980. He was appointed Deputy Commissioner of Cooperatives Development from 1983 to 1985, promoted Commissioner for Cooperatives and served in that capacity from 1985 to 1988, and served as the General Manager, and then Managing Director of the Co-operative Bank of Kenya from 1988 to 2001.

== Political career ==
Hon Mureithi was elected as the member of parliament for Ol Kalou Constituency in the Kenyan general election of 2007. This was the last parliament elected under the 1963 Constitution of Kenya, in which Hon Mureithi served as a member of the Agriculture, Livestock and Co-operatives Committee. He vied for and lost the race for the position of the newly created Ol Joro Orok Constituency in the 2013 general election.

== Endeavours after Politics ==
Hon Mureithi has served as the founder and chairman of the Suera Corporation, which is a business with investments in flower farming and the hotel industry. In 2018, he was approached by Daystar University to serve as a member of a special task force to review governance matters at the university. He would be one of the members of that task force that would be incorporated into a new university council later that year, which appointed Professor Laban Ayiro as Vice Chancellor of the university later that year. He would serve on that council until 2025, briefly acting as the chairperson of the council's finance committee.

Hon Mureithi was granted an Honorary Doctorate degree in Christian Counselling from the International Faith Theological Seminary and University College in 2010.
