= Thagana =

Thagana or Sagana can refer to:

== Rivers ==
- Thagana, Kenyan Kikuyu name for the Tana River
- Thagana or Sagana River, a tributary of the Tana River

== Places ==
- Sagana, a geographical settlement near the Tana River
- Thagana, an alternate name for the town Sagana
- Sagana, an early name for what became Saginaw, Michigan
