= Gichugu Constituency =

Kenyan electoral constituency

Gichugu Constituency is an electoral constituency in Kenya. It is one of four constituencies in Kirinyaga County. The constituency was established for the 1963 elections and was known as Kirinyaga East Constituency between the 1966 and 1983 general elections

== Members of Parliament ==
Elections	MP	Party	Notes
1963	Kimamu Njiru Gichoya	KANU	One-party system
1966	Bernard Kathanga	KANU	One-party system
1969	Kimamu Njiru Gichoya	KANU	One-party system
1974	Nahashon Njunu Njuno	KANU	One-party system
1979	Nahashon Njunu Njuno	KANU	One-party system
1983	Nahashon Njunu Njuno	KANU	One-party system.
1988	Goefrey Kariithi Karekia	KANU	One-party system.
1992	Martha Karua	Democratic Party	
1997	Martha Karua	Democratic Party	
2002	Martha Karua	NARC	
2007	Martha Karua	PNU	
2013	Ejidius Njogu Barua	TNA	
2017	Robert Gichimu Githinji	Jubilee Party	
2022	Robert Gichimu Githinji	United Democratic Alliance	IND.

== Locations and wards ==
Locations	Population
Baragwi	21,711
Kabare	20,392
Karumandi	26,898
Kirima	31,697
Ngariama	20,253
Njukini	24,266
Total	145,217

== Registered voters per ward ==
Baragwi	9,697	Kirinyaga county
Kabare	6,867	Kirinyaga county
Karumandi	13,248	Kirinyaga county
Kirima	16,658	Kirinyaga county
Kutus Central	1,795	Kerugoya/Kutus municipality
Ngariama	10,251	Kirinyaga county
Njuki-ini	10,747	Kirinyaga county
Total	69,263	
*September 2005,

== Members of County Assembly (MCAs) 2027 ==
Baragwi	Incoming MCA: Ruth Gacheke Mwangi	Outgoing MCA: David Mathenge
Kabare	Incoming MCA: Alex Mithamo wangui	Outgoing MCA: isaih mbogo
Karumandi	Incoming MCA: Harrison Kariuki Bundi	Outgoing MCA: Munene Roho safi
Kirima (Within Kabare Ward)	John Ndwiga Bosco	
Njuki-ini	Incoming MCA: James Mugo	Outgoing MCA: Cendi

== Electoral history ==
=== 2017 ===
2017 Kenyan general election in Gichugu Constituency
Party	Candidate	Votes	%
Jubilee	Robert Gichimu Githinji	68,521	92.28%
Independent	Andrew Bundi Njogu	4,634	6.24%
PNU	Dominic Ndwiga Ngure	1,100	1.48%
Majority		63,887	86.04%
Turnout		74,255	
Jubilee gain from National Alliance			

=== 2013 ===
2013 Kenyan general election in Gichugu Constituency
Party	Candidate	Votes	%
National Alliance	Ejidius Njogu Barua	24,839	41.38%
GNU	Robert Gichimu Githinji	20,192	33.68%
Agano	James Gachinga	9,088	15.14%
Others		5,897	9.83%
Majority		4,647	7.70%
Turnout		60,016	
National Alliance gain from PNU			
