= Kagumo High School =

- Kiganjo, Nyeri County, Kenya. Nyeri, P. BOX 69-10102

Information
- Other names: Kagumo School
- School type: National School
- Mottoes: Struggle For Excellence; Where The Brains And Talents Of Kenya Are
- Established: 1933
- Sister school: Bishop Gatimu Ngandu Girls High School
- Category: National School (Cluster 1)
- School code: 08200007
- Principal: Dr. Silas Mwirigi
- Teaching staff: 50+
- Enrollment: 2,000+
- Average class size: 48
- Classrooms: 52
- Houses: White House Kimathi House Muhoya House Wambugu House Aggrey House Washington House Kraph House Wilberforce House Dr. Kamunge House Makau house
- Slogan: Developing Gentlemen Of Consolidated Intellect
- Song: Mungu wetu, twakuomba, ushindi uwe wetu. Kwa masomo na michezo, tuzidi kuongoza. Kwa imani twakuomba, amani upendo umoja. Ibariki, ibariki, Kagumo shule yetu.
- Nickname: Kaggz/Kabau
- Rival: Nyeri High School
- National ranking: 1
- Newspaper: The Emerald
- Alumni name: Kagumo Old Boys Association (KOBA)

Kagumo High School is a boys' national high school situated between Kirichu and Kiganjo townships along the Nyeri-Nanyuki road in Kenya. Established in 1933 as a primary institution in Gatitu, its initial aim was to train artisans for Native African training depots. In 1958, the school relocated to its current location in Kiganjo, thanks to land provided by Chief Wambugu wa Muigua. Over the years, Kagumo High School has gained recognition for its academic achievements. In 1946, it was among the first schools in the country to permit Africans to sit for University Level Entrance Exams. Designated a national school in 2012, it now hosts a student population exceeding 1,200, distributed across 11 streams. Notable alumni from Kagumo High School have excelled in various fields, including politics, law, business, and medicine.

== History ==
Kagumo High School is a boys-only national school situated in Kiganjo, Kenya. Its origins trace back to January 1933 when it was established as a primary institution in Gatitu. The primary objective was to train artisans for the Native Industrial Training Depot at Kabete. The land for the school was allocated by the colonial government, facilitated by the Local Native Council in the late 1920s. Initial construction of the school buildings was carried out by businessman and philanthropist Ernest Carr.

During its early years, the school served the educational requirements of African students who were unable to attend white schools due to segregation policies. In response to the increasing demand for African education, the school transitioned into a regular primary school offering classes up to the intermediate level. In 1944, Kagumo Teachers Training College was established adjacent to the primary school. Alexander Gitau and Joseph Koinange were among the first students of this college, benefitting from practical teaching opportunities conveniently available within the same compound as the primary school.

In 1949, the institution established a secondary section alongside the existing teacher training section. In 1951, Kagumo presented 18 students for the "O" Level examination, all of whom successfully passed, qualifying for admission to Makerere University College.

The donation of land by Chief Wambugu wa Muigua in 1958 facilitated the relocation of the school to its present site in Kiganjo along the Nyeri-Nanyuki Road. This relocation occurred in May 1960, under the leadership of Reverend Douglas Melhuish. Despite encountering initial challenges, such as insufficient housing and a lack of laboratories, Reverend Melhuish spearheaded the construction of several essential structures, including the Assembly Hall, which remain in use to this day.

Since its inception as a primary school with 96 students in 1933, Kagumo High School has evolved significantly. It attained national school status in 2012, with a student population of 1,200, and has since grown to accommodate over 2,000 students. In 1946, it played a pioneering role in the country's educational landscape by being among the first schools to permit native black Africans to sit for University Level Entrance Exams.

The completion of a branch railway line to Nanyuki in 1931 played a significant role in the development of the Mount Kenya region and contributed to the establishment of the school.

== Notable alumni ==
- Wahome Gakuru
- Mutahi Kagwe
- Francis Kimemia
- Patrick Makau
- Kenneth Marende
- Anthony Muheria
- James Mwangi
- Francis Nyenze
