= Wanguru =

Kenyan town

Wanguru Wang'uru, Ngurubani
- Location in Kenya
- Coordinates: 00°40′57″S 37°21′25″E
- Country: Kenya
- County: Kirinyaga County
- Elevation: 3,901 ft (1,189 m)

Population (2009 Census)
  - Total: 7,625

Wanguru, also Wang'uru or Mwea, is a town in Kenya. It is one of the urban centres in Kirinyaga County. Other towns in the county include Kagio, Sagana, Kerugoya and the county seat, Kutus.

== Location ==
Wanguru is located in Kirinyaga County, approximately 101 kilometres (63 mi), by road, north-east of Nairobi, Kenya's capital and largest city. The coordinates of Wanguru are: 0°40'57.0"S, 37°21'25.0"E (Latitude:-0.682500; Longitude:37.356944). The town of Wanguru lies at an average elevation of 1,189 metres (3,901 ft), above sea level.

== Overview ==
Wanguru (Mwea) is a rapidly expanding urban center. The Mwea Irrigation Scheme, produces over 50 percent of all the rice grown in Kenya. The town is home to a number of rice stores and several rice mills, which operate throughout the year. Some sources estimate Mwea's contribution to the national rice basket at 80 percent.

== See also ==
- Thika Highway
