= Joseph Ndathi =

Kenyan politician

Joseph Ndathi (born 1957 in Kirinyaga, Kenya) is a Kenyan politician. He is the former governor of Kirinyaga County in Kenya. Ndathi is a member of The National Alliance party. Ndathi is also the first governor of Kirinyaga County.

== Career ==
Before being elected governor Ndathi was the principal Immigration Officer and Director of Immigration Services (Office of the President) in Kenya. He was also the Secretary of Foreign Service Administration (Ministry of Foreign Affairs). In 2013, he resigned that position and ran for governor of Kirinyaga County. He was elected into office that same year as Governor of Kirinyaga County.

== Controversy ==
Ndathi was questioned by the senate committee on Public Accounts and Investments Committee over irregular use of county funds totaling up to KShs234.9million between July 2013 and 30 June 2014. He was asked to provide proper and accurate paperwork to the Auditor general's office.
