= Thumaita =

Coordinates: 0°27′S 37°22′E

Thumaita is rural village on the southern slope of Mount Kenya located in the Kirinyaga District, Central Province, of Kenya.

== Popular culture ==
Part of Haron Wachira's 1999 novel Waiting for Darkness is set in Thumaita.
