= Ol Kalou Constituency =

Electoral constituency in Kenya

Ol Kalou Constituency is an electoral constituency in Kenya. It is one of five constituencies in Nyandarua County. The constituency was established for the 1997 elections.

== Members of Parliament ==
Elections	MP	Party	Notes
1997	Karue Muriuki	DP	
2002	Karue Muriuki	NARC	
2007	Erastus Kihara Mureithi	PNU	
2013	David Njuguna Kiaraho	Jubilee Party	
2017	David Njuguna Kiaraho	Jubilee Party	
2022	David Njuguna Kiaraho	Jubilee Party	Seat became vacant after he died on 29 March 2026.
2026 by-election	Sammy Kamau Ngotho	Democracy for the Citizens Party (DCP)	Won the by-election held on 16 July 2026.

Member of Parliament, David Njuguna Kiaraho served as its representative from 2013 up to his 2026 death. Sammy Kamau serves as its current MP since 28 June 2026.

== 2026 by-election ==
The by-election to find its next Member of the National Assembly was held on 16 July. The campaigns were characterized by violence and accusations of corruption and voter bribery. On 9 July, the Independent Electoral and Boundaries Commission (IEBC) warned that it could be forced to postpone the by-election if the alleged cases of violence, voter bribery, destruction of campaign materials and the use of hired gangs (goons) continued. It also warned that candidates found to have broken the Electoral Code of Conduct would face sanctions like disqualification from participating in the by-election. A day later, former Deputy President and Democracy for Citizens Party (DCP) founder, Rigathi Gachagua claimed that there was no such violence experienced in Ol Kalou. He however made the allegation that public funds were used to bribe voters by giving out cash handouts and development projects. Some individuals and organisations such as Amnesty International Kenya asked the IEBC to postpone the election of it could not ensure that it would be free and fair. On 13 July, the Law Society of Kenya expressed dissatisfaction over the IEBC's threat to postpone the by-election, it instead asked the electoral agency and other law enforcement agencies to investigate and prosecute any persons found violating electoral laws. It likened delaying the elections to punishing voters. On 14 July, the Inspector General of Police, Douglas Kanja, announced that at least 1,000 police officers would be deployed to Ol Kalou during the by-election to prevent "goonism" and violence and ensure the election would be free and fair. On 17 July, Sammy Kamau Ngotho of the DCP was declared the winner in a landslide of 35,440 votes. His closest competitor was Samuel Muchina Nyaga of the United Democratic Alliance (UDA) with 5,450 votes, while Wilson Kigwa of the Jubilee Party had 198. There was a 57% voter turnout, with 41,656 of 73,480 registered voters participating. The voting day was affected by violence from armed men riding in unmarked vehicles who attacked journalists and residents of Ol Kalou. The deployed police officers used teargas to disperse several crowds that had gathered at polling stations.

=== Bribery and violence ===
Both ruling party (UDA) politicians and United Opposition politicians accused each other of planning violence and bribing voters. UDA leaders allegedly attempted to bribe voters by giving them mattresses and cooking gas cylinders, and campaigning using government money. Opposition leaders asked the Directorate of Criminal Investigations and the IEBC to investigate the alleged bribery and take legal action.

== Wards ==
Ward	Registered Voters	Local Authority
Gichungo	3,275	Ol Kalou town
Kaimbaga	2,576	Ol Kalou town
Olkalou	7,732	Ol Kalou town
Olkalou Central	5,380	Ol Kalou town
Rurii	3,867	Ol Kalou town
Dundori	12,052	Nyandarua County
Gathanji	10,440	Nyandarua County
Gatimu	5,965	Nyandarua County
Kanjuiri Ridge	7,942	Nyandarua County
Ol Joro Orok / Kasuku	12,387	Nyandarua County
Total	71,616	
*September 2005.
