= Jeremiah Ngayu Kioni =

Kenyan politician

Member of the Kenyan Parliament
- In office 2007–2013
- Constituency: Ndaragwa
- In office 2017–2022

Personal details
- Education: University of Nairobi (BA), (LL.B), (MA)

Jeremiah Ngayu Kioni is a Kenyan politician. He was elected to represent the Ndaragwa Constituency until 2013 in the National Assembly of Kenya in the 2007 Kenyan parliamentary election. He was re-elected in 2017. Jeremiah Kioni issued a threat of PNU pulling out of the Grand Coalition because of what he termed continued frustration by the ODM party over Mwai Kibaki judiciary nominations. He is a friend of Jamleck Irungu Kamau.

On January 22, 2013, Kioni was selected as the vice presidential running mate for the 2013 general election, but was not elected.

== See also ==
- Politics of Kenya
