= Njabini =

- Location within Kenya
- Coordinates: 0.72°S 36.67°E
- Country: Kenya
- County: Nyandarua County
- Time zone: UTC+3 (EAT)

Njabini is a small town in Nyandarua County, Kenya.

It lies to the west of the Aberdare ranges and due to this receives a significant proportion of the rainfall in the region. It is a highly productive agricultural area with vegetables being the mainstay. Njabini town is the administrative district forSouth Kinangop division. Approximately 40% of the population have clean accessible water. Electricity is supplied mainly to residential and commercial properties but high installation costs put it out of reach of many residents. The Sasumua and Chania rivers traverse the area. Chania river supplements Sasumua river via an underground man-made aqueduct and drain into the Sasumua dam. The impounded water is treated at the water works before being piped to Nairobi. The treated water accounts for roughly 30% of the capital's requirements.

Njabini ward has a population of around 20,665 According to 2024 a study on local conservation efforts surrounding the adjacent Aberdare Range ecosystem.

Njabini is located in the Kinangop constituency of Nyandarua county and borders around the western slopes of Aberdare Range.

== Education ==
There are several primary schools which serve the local community. These are Chania Primary School, Kimathi Primary school, Njabini Primary School, Kiburu Road Primary School, Mucibau Primary School, and Sasumua Primary School. There are six secondary schools: Njabini Boys High School, Sasumua secondary, Mt. Kinangop Girls High School, Njabini Girls School, St' Anuarite Secondary School, Mucibau Secondary and Aberdare Girls. There is also one technical college in Njabini.

== History ==
Njabini has historical roots connected to colonial era. Later the region formed part of "White Highlands" - An area settled down exclusively by European farmers, who took advantage of the better fertile soils and other geographical advantages. Remnants of this change can still be found in its colonial-style architecture, located in the area's older region to this day. After its independence in the 1960s, there were major changes, such as land distribution schemes, that redistributed the lands through government schemes known as "Kinangop Resettlement Scheme", transforming it into the vibrant green farmland we see today.

== Major site ==
- Sasumua Dam
- Aberdare ranges,
