= Daniel Karaba =

Kenyan politician (1948–2026)

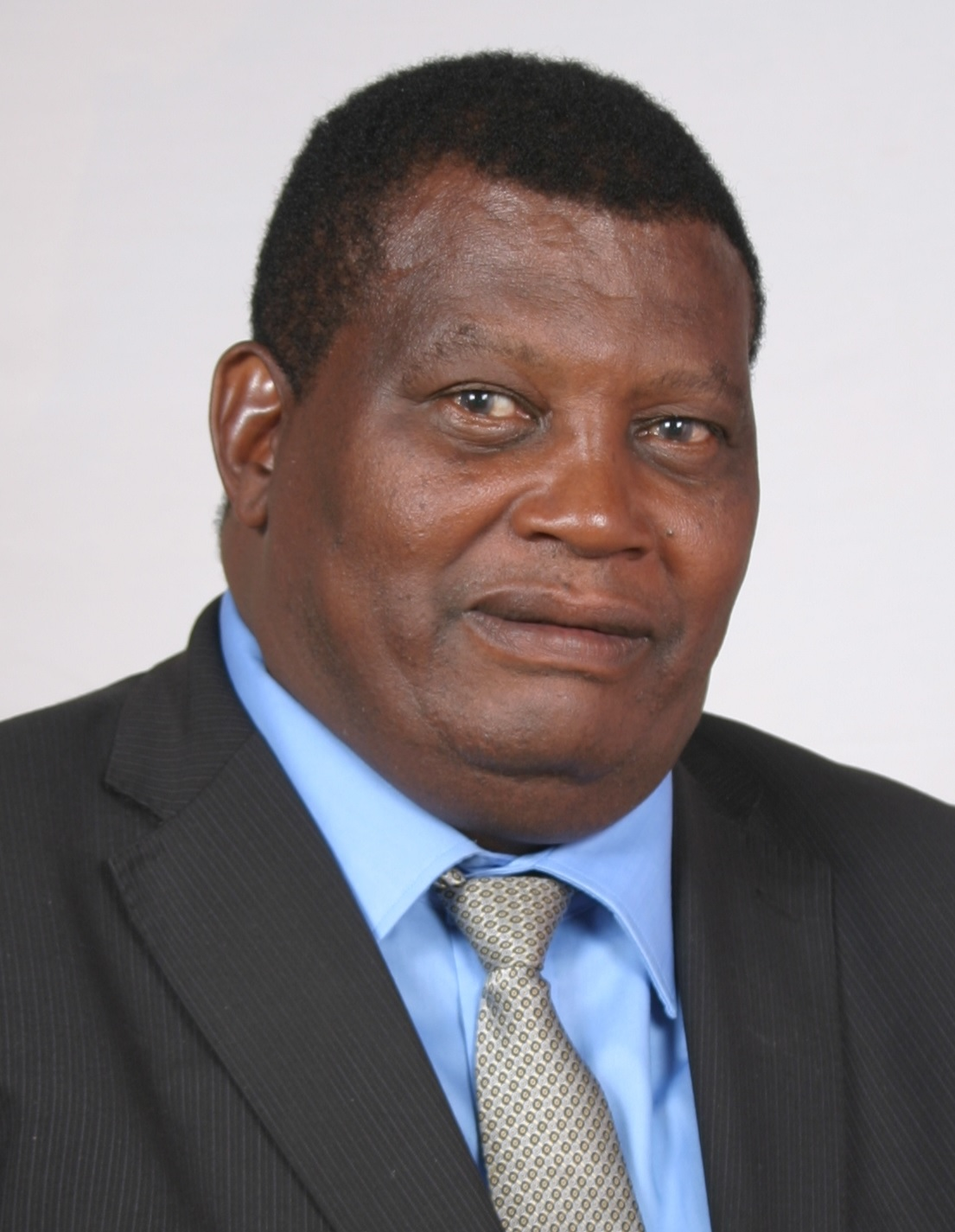

Dickson Daniel Karaba (22 June 1948 – 23 March 2026) was a Kenyan politician. He represented Kirinyaga County in the Kenyan Senate from 2013 to 2017. He was a member of The National Alliance (TNA), a constituent party of the Jubilee Alliance coalition.

== Early life ==
Daniel Karaba was born on 22 June 1948 by Caesarean section in the village of Kiamaina in Kirinyaga County. He attended Kiamaina Primary School and proceeded to Kamuiru High School for his O Levels. He then joined Kagumo high school for his A levels. Karaba enrolled in the University of Nairobi for his bachelor's degree in education.

He became a professional teacher and was promoted to a deputy principal and later a principal of various schools in Kenya including, Kagumo High School, Highway Secondary School, Kianyaga High School, Kirimara High School, Njegas Secondary School.

Karaba was also the Chair of Secondary Schools Heads Association between 1984 and 1998.

== Political career ==
Karaba ventured into politics in 2002, winning the Kirinyaga Central parliamentary seat on a NARC party ticket. In 2007, he lost the seat to John Ngata Kariuki. Karaba filled a petition challenging the election. In October 2010, the Supreme Court nullified the election. In February 2011 Karaba lost to Joseph Gitari.

In 2013, he contested Kirinyaga Senatorial seat on a TNA party ticket and won with a landslide garnering 215,977 votes.

He served as a chairman of education committee in the 9th parliament and was given the same role in the 11th parliament as the Chairman of the Senate Education Committee.

Karaba was a member of two Senate committees, the Committee on Delegated Legislation and Committee on Parliamentary Broadcasting & Library.

== Death ==
Karaba died on 23 March 2026, at the age of 77.

== Sources ==
- "Parliament of Kenya - Establishment and role of Parliament". Parliament.go.ke.
- "Election Petition 8 of 2013". Kenya Law.
- "Daniel Dickson Karaba Experience:: Mzalendo". Info.mzalendo.com.
- "Alumni Welcoming". Kagumooldboys.or.ke. 26 June 2015. Archived from the original on 29 March 2016.
