= Mary M'Mukindia =

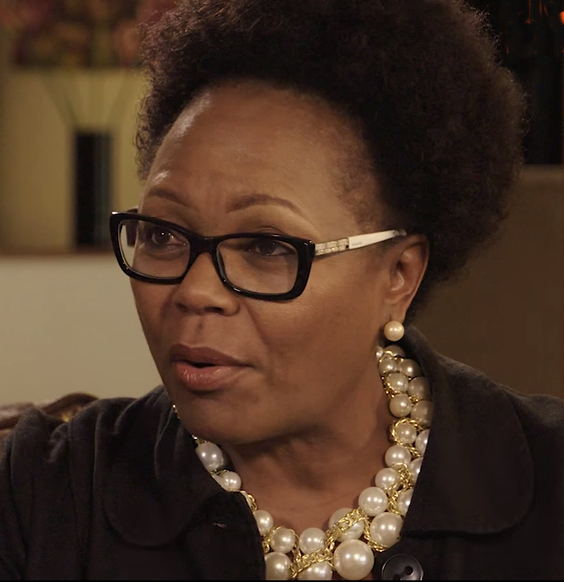
- Born: July 1957 (age 68)
- Education: University of Nairobi
- Known for: Oil & Gas, Directorships, Coaching & Leadership
- Title: Business Consultant, Leadership Trainer, Public Speaker and an Executive Leadership Coach.
- Children: two
- Website: https://www.marymmukindia.co.ke

Mary M'Mukindia MBS (born 1957) is a Kenyan businessperson in the petrochemicals industry, who was CEO of the National Oil Corporation of Kenya (NOCK) from 2003 to 2008. In 2015, several major newspapers implicated her in a bribery scandal connected to the failed 2013 presidential campaign of Martha Karua, but a subsequent court case found these charges to be malicious and false. As of 2018, she works as a consultant and leadership coach.

== Life ==
Mary Kimotho M'Mukindia was born in July 1957. She graduated from the University of Nairobi. She entered the oil and gas industry, working as an executive for ExxonMobil in Kenya and the United Kingdom. She was a founding member and first General Manager of the Petroleum Institute of East Africa (PIEA). She worked on the communications team of Mwai Kibaki and after his election as President of Kenya in 2003, he appointed her CEO of the National Oil Corporation of Kenya (NOCK), as part of his efforts to appoint qualified experts to state managerial positions. In this role she used her links with Kibaki to build up NOCK's oil and gas exploration division. NOCK began to participate in overseas marketing trips and attending major international industry conferences. This resulted in a modest increase of overseas investors' interest in Kenyan oil and gas. M'Mukindia resigned from NOCK in 2008, allegedly due to disappointment at political appointments to NOCK's board and NOCK's loss of access to government funds. She was awarded the Moran of the Burning Spear in 2007. She was with UNEP, working for the Partnership for Clean Fuels and Vehicles from 2007 to 2012.

She was a confidante of the businessman and politician Njenga Karume. Before he died from cancer in 2013 he had formed the Njenga Karume Foundation which was designed to manage his inheritance. A board of trustees was chosen to manage these interests which thereafter appointed M'Mukinda to the Jacaranda Holdings board in October 2012.

In 2013 Martha Karua, a former justice minister, ran unsuccessfully to be President of Kenya and M'Mukindia was a campaign adviser and fundraiser on her campaign. In December 2015 Karua admitted to receiving a multimillion-pound "donation" to her presidential campaign costs from British American Tobacco. Karua said that she thought that the contribution by Paul Hopkins, a BAT employee, was a personal donation. The money was paid according to Karua via M'Mukindia. It was alleged that the money was given in return for details of the technology that Kenya was going to use to identify illegal tobacco smuggling. M'Mukindia, in civil case no. 5 of 2016, sued the Nation Media Group for defamation and in a judgement dated November 29, 2017, was awarded general, aggravated, and exemplary damages against the defendants as the court found the publication was false and actuated by malice on the part of the defendants. As a result of the scandal, M'Mukindia resigned from the board of directors of the Unga Group in April 2016, but she continued as a board member of the Kenya Revenue Authority until the expiry of her term in August 2016.

As of 2018, she was advertising herself as an Executive Leadership Coach, Business Consultant and a Leadership Trainer.
