= Ndaragwa Constituency =

Kenyan electoral constituency

Ndaragwa Constituency is an electoral constituency in Kenya. It is one of five constituencies in Nyandarua County. The constituency has four wards, all of which elect MCAs for the Nyandarua County Government. The constituency was established for the 1988 elections.

== Members of Parliament ==
Elections	MP	Party	Notes
1988	Fredrick Kimondo Wagura	KANU	One-party system.
1992	W. Gichuki Mwangi	DP	
1997	Thirikwa Kamau	DP	
2002	Geoffrey Gachara Muchiri	NARC	
2007	Jeremiah Ngayu Kioni	PNU	
2013	Francis Waweru Nderitu	TNA	
2017	Jeremiah Ngayu Kioni	JP	
2022	George Gachagua	UDA	

== Wards ==
Ward	Registered Voters
Kiriita	6,769
Leshau Pondo	10,529
Ndaragwa	12,888
Shamata	8,600
Total	38,786
*September 2005.
