= Joseph Gitari =

Kenyan politician

Hon. Joseph Gitari is a Kenyan politician. He is the Member of Parliament for Kirinyaga Central Constituency since February 2011. He was elected after the fall of the former MP, Hon Ngata Kariuki.

Joseph Gitari is a former student of Kamuiru Boys High School.
