= Kirichu =

- Country: Kenya
- Province: Rift Valley Province
- Time zone: UTC+3 (EAT)

Kirichu is a settlement in Kenya's Rift Valley Province.
