= Gituamba =

Settlement in kenya

- Location within Kenya
- Coordinates: 0.03°N 36.23°E
- Country: Kenya
- County: Kiambu County
- Time zone: UTC+3 (EAT)

Gituamba is a settlement in Kenya's Kiambu County.
