= Embu =

Embu may refer to:

== Places ==
in Brazil

- Embu das Artes
- Embu-Guaçu

in Kenya

- Embu, Kenya
- Embu County

== Other ==
- Embu people of Kenya
- Embu language, the Bantu language spoken by them
