= Kikuyu =

Kikuyu or Gikuyu (Gĩkũyũ) mostly refers to an ethnic group in Kenya or its associated language. It may also refer to:

- Kikuyu people, a majority ethnic group in Kenya
- Kikuyu language, the language of Kikuyu people
- Kikuyu, Kenya, a town in Central province in the Eastern African country
- Kikuyu Central Association, a political organisation in Kenya
- Kikuyu Constituency, an electoral division in Kenya
- Kikuyu grass, Pennisetum clandestinum
- A fictional corporation in Walter Jon Williams' novel Hardwired
