= Ol Joro Orok Constituency =

Ol Joro Orok
- constituency
- Country: Kenya
- County: Nyandarua County

Ol Joro Orok is a constituency in Kenya. It is one of five constituencies in Nyandarua County. It has an area of 439 km^{2} (169 sq mi), and an approximate polpulation of 95,643. It is further sub-divided into four County assembly wards: Gathanji, Gatimu, Weru, Charagita
