= Kirinyaga Central Constituency =

Kenyan electoral constituency

Kirinyaga Central
- constituency for the Parliament of Kenya
- Kirinyaga Central Constituency within Kirinyaga County

- Kirinyaga County within Kenya
- County: Kirinyaga
- Population: 122,740
- Area: 153 km^{2} (59.1 sq mi)

Current constituency
- Number of members: 1
- Party: UDA
- Member of Parliament: Gachoki Gitari
- Wards: 4

Kirinyaga Central Constituency, formerly known as Kerugoya/Kutus Constituency is an electoral constituency in Kenya. It is one of four constituencies in Kirinyaga County. The constituency was established for the 1997 elections.

== Members of Parliament ==
Elections	MP	Party	Notes
1997	John Matere Keriri	Democratic Party	
2002	Daniel Karaba	NARC	
2007	John Ngata Kariuki	Ford-Asili	Kariuki lost his seat in October 2010 following a court petition
2011	Joseph Gitari	PNU	By-election.
2013	Joseph Gachoki Gitari	TNA	
2017	John Munene Wambugu	Jubilee	
2022	Joseph Gachoki Gitari	UDA	

== Wards ==
Ward	Registered Voters	Local authority
Kerugoya Central	6,474	Kerugoya/Kutus municipality
Kerugoya North	3,051	Kerugoya/Kutus municipality
Nduini	3,501	Kerugoya/Kutus municipality
Inoi	9,683	Kirinyaga county
Kanyeki-ine	10,080	Kirinyaga county
Kerugoya South	4,728	Kirinyaga county
Muruana	8,280	Kirinyaga county
Mutira	12,475	Kirinyaga county
Total	58,272	
*September 2005,
