= Francis Kimemia =

Governor Francis Thuita Kimemia EGH, CBS, HSC (born 27 October 1957) is a Kenyan administrator, politician, securocrat, bureaucrat, and seasonally appointed civil servant.

== Early life ==
Kimemia was born in Gituamba village, Central Province, Kenya, to ex-councillor Mr. Joseph Kimemia Migwi HSC, and Mrs. Maria Nunga Kimemia (née Thuita).

== Education ==
He attended HGM Uplands Primary School (1964–1970) for Eastern African Certificate of Primary Education (EACPE), Nyandarua High School (1971–1974) for Eastern African Certificate of Education (EACE), and Kagumo High School (1975–1976) for the Eastern African Advance Certificate of Education (EAACE). He holds a Bachelors of Arts in Government & Literature, Second Class Honors, Upper Division (1978–1980) from the University of Nairobi, a Bachelors of Arts in Public Administration, First Class Honors, (1981–1983) from Moi University, a Bachelors of Arts in Political Science, First Class Honors, (1986–1989) from the University of Nairobi, and a Master's Degree in Business Administration, (1999–2004) from Eastern Southern African Management Institute.

== Career ==
- Former Secretary to the Cabinet (29 May 2013 – 17 April 2015)

== Family ==
He is married to Ambassador Ann Wangui Thuita, Mrs. (née Wanjohi). They have four children: Abraham Kimemia Thuita, Sarah Mariah Nunga Thuita, David Wanjohi Thuita, and Consolata Njeri Thuita.
