= Sagana =

Town in Kirinyaga County, Kenya

- Town
- Nickname: "Thagana"
- Location within Kenya
- Coordinates: 00°39′S 37°12′E
- Country: Kenya
- County: Kirinyaga
- Founded: 1920

Government
  - Governor: Governor Ann Waiguru

Area
  - Total: 37 km^{2} (14 sq mi)
- Elevation: 2,161 m (7,090 ft)

Population (2014)
  - Total: 13,000
  - Density: 512/km^{2} (1,330/sq mi)
- Estimates
- Time zone: UTC+3 (EAT)
- Area code: 060

Sagana is a small industrial town in Kirinyaga District, Kenya. It is along the Nairobi-Nyeri highway, approximately 100 kilometres north of Nairobi, the capital of Kenya. The town is named after Kenya's longest river, the Sagana River, also known as Thagana. The town also inspired the rhumba song "Afro Mtoto wa Sagana". The town and its surrounding areas are experiencing growth in the hospitality industry, particularly along the banks of River Sagana, where cottages, water sports, and other tourist attractions are being established.

== Climate ==
Sagana has two distinct rainy seasons and dry weather throughout the year. The average 30 year annual rainfall is 1,166 mm.

The warmest period is February through April with a distinct cool season between June and August, when rainfall is at a minimum. Even though there is little rain, the skies tend to be overcast much of the day during this period. A rainy period known as the “short rains” occurs between October and December. The “long rains” fall from March through May with a single-month peak of 500 mm or more in April.

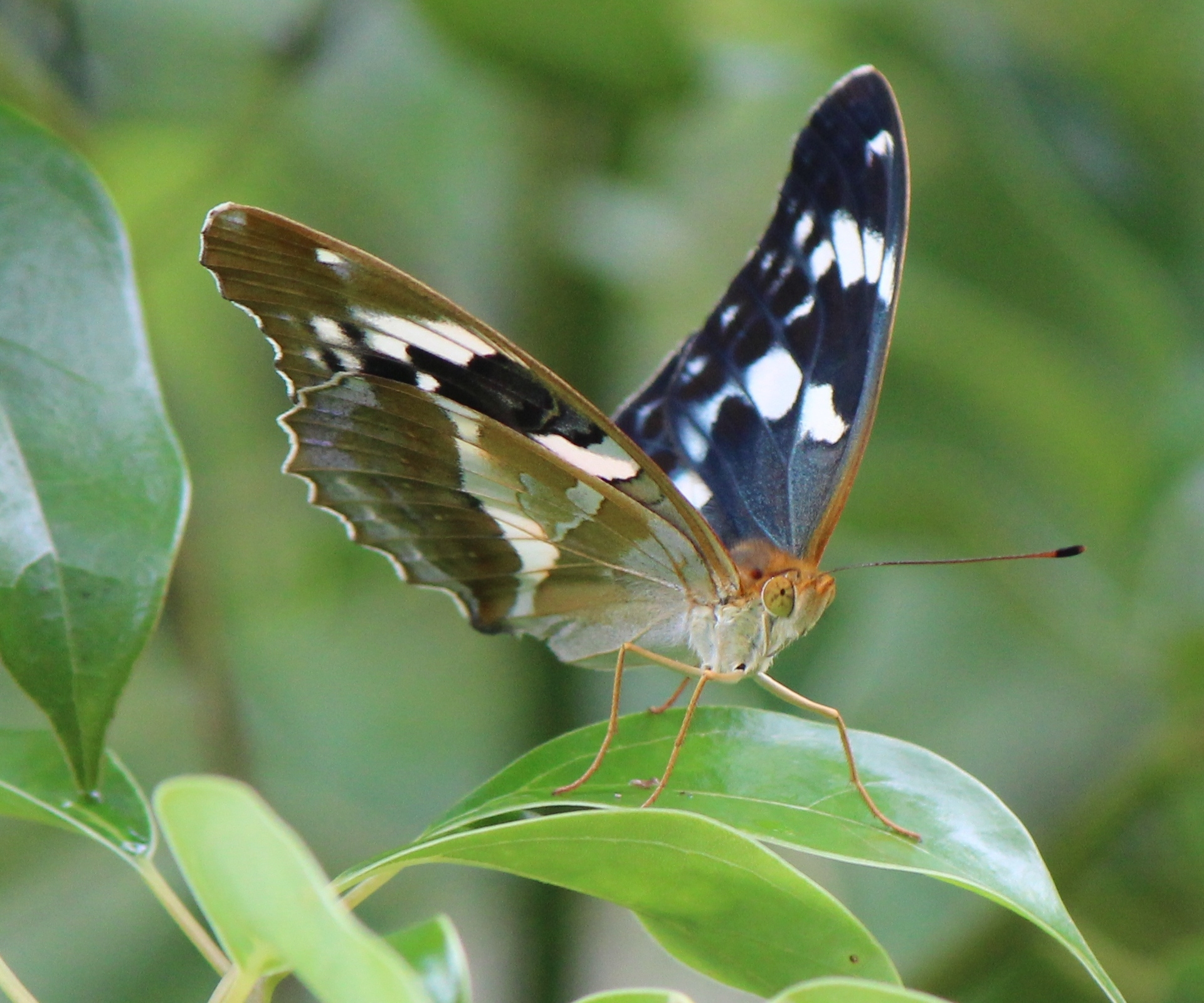
Common Argynnis sagana butterfly common in this area

=== Temperatures ===
Daily average: 17 to 23 °C Cool season average: 17 to 19 °C Warm season average: 19 to 23 °C Daily minimum: 14 to 19 °C Daily maximum: 20 to 30 °C

=== Topography ===
Sagana is situated at the edge of a large plain at the southern foot of Mt. Kenya. Soils were formed on volcanic rocks from Mt. Kenya — latest Pliocene to Pleistocene basalts, phonolites, and pyroclastics. In areas with free drainage conditions on moderate to steep slopes, lateritic and red to reddish brown soils are present. Some areas with black cotton soils indicate that the soils have formed under restricted drainage conditions, which are the result of low rainfall and the presence of level to moderate slopes.

== History ==
The town is known to have started in the early 19th Century. Sagana was home to the only railway station in Kirinyaga district.

== See also ==
- Sagana Lodge
