= Kirinyaga County =

County of Kenya

Coordinates: 0°30′S 37°17′E

- County
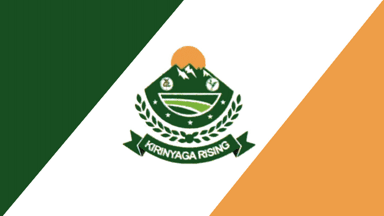
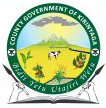
- Flag Coat of arms

- Location in Kenya
- Country: Kenya
- Formed: 4 March 2013
- Capital: Kutus

Government
  - Governor: Anne Waiguru

Area
  - Total: 1,478.1 km^{2} (570.7 sq mi)

Population (2019)
  - Total: 610,411
  - Density: 412.97/km^{2} (1,069.6/sq mi)
- Time zone: UTC+3 (EAT)
- Website: kirinyaga.go.ke

Kirinyaga County is one of the 47 counties of Kenya in the Mount Kenya region of Kenya, south of Mount Kenya. Its capital is Kutus and its largest town is Wanguru. In 2019, the county had a population of 610,411 people and has an area of 1,478.1 km^{2}. The county is bordered to the east and south by Embu County, to the south by a tiny part of Machakos County, to the southwest by Murang'a County and to the northwest by Nyeri County.

Kirinyaga County lies between 1158m and 5199m above sea level; its highest point is the summit of Mount Kenya.

Kirinyaga County's governor is Anne Waiguru, who was elected for her first term in 2017, succeeding Joseph Ndathi. She was re-elected in 2022.

== Etymology ==
The name Kirinyaga is derived from the name of the mountain now called Mount Kenya. When the German explorer Johann Ludwig Krapf came across the mountain, his guide, Kamba trader Chief Kivoi, told Krapf that the mountain was called Kii Nyaa, the Kamba translation of the Kikuyu's Kiri Nyaga. Krapf would then record this as Kenya, a name which would be applied to the mountain and later the country.

== History ==
Kirinyaga District was established in 1963 from the western part of Embu District. Kerugoya was the district's administrative headquarters. After it became a county, Kutus was made the county Headquarters. In 2007, Kirinyaga District was divided into four new districts:

- Kirinyaga Central with its administrative centre in Kerugoya
- Kirinyaga East with its administrative centre in Kianyaga
- Kirinyaga South with its administrative centre in Wanguru
- Kirinyaga West with its administrative centre in Baricho

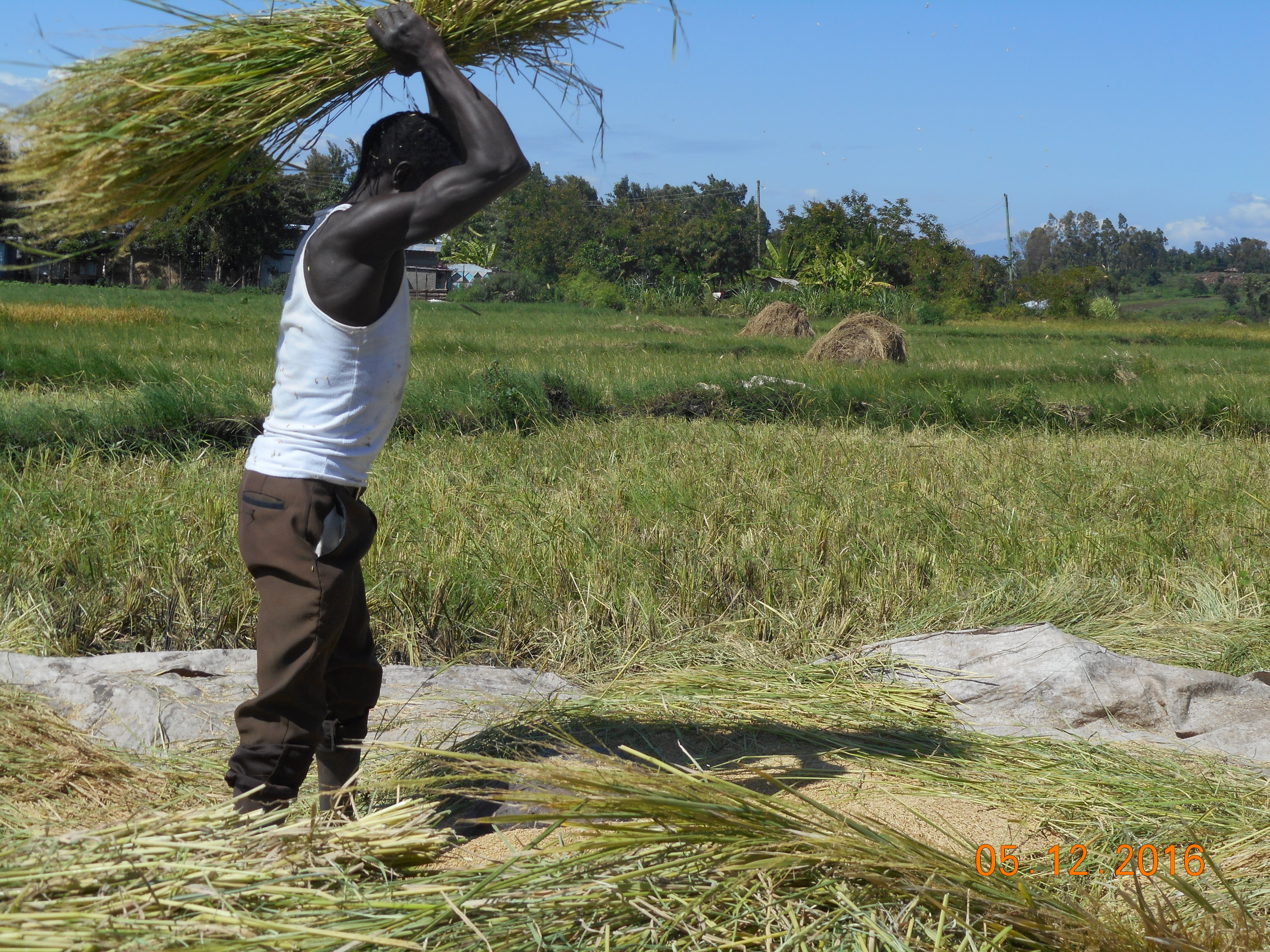
Rice threshing in Mwea

== Administration ==
Since April 2013, the County Government of Kirinyaga has administered all of Kirinyaga County. Formerly, the County Council of Kirinyaga administered the county excluding the area that was administered by the Municipal Council of Kerugoya/Kutus and the Town Council of Sagana-Kagio.

Kirinyaga County's governor is Anne Waiguru, who was elected to her first term in 2017, succeeding Joseph Ndathi. She was re-elected in 2022.

== Subdivisions ==
Kirinyaga District is divided as follows:

Local authorities (councils)
Authority	Type	Population*	Urban pop.*
Kerugoya/Kutus	Municipality	39,441	14,056
Sagana/Kagio	Town	22,475	3,031
Kirinyaga	County	395,189	13,103
Total	-	457,105	30,190
* 1999 census. Source:

Administrative divisions
Division	Population*	Urban pop.*	Headquarters
Central	74,068	12,585	Kerugoya
Gichugu	121,738	1,988	Kianyaga
Mwea	125,962	7,625	Wanguru
Ndia	135,337	2,960	Baricho
Total	457,105	25,158	-
* 1999 census. Sources: ,

=== Electoral constituencies ===
The county has four constituencies:

- Mwea Constituency
- Gichugu Constituency
- Ndia Constituency
- Central Constituency

== Population ==
Historical population
Year	Pop.	±%
1979	291,431	—
1989	391,516	+34.3%
1999	457,105	+16.8%
2009	528,054	+15.5%
2019	610,411	+15.6%

=== Religion ===
Religion in Kirinyaga County

Religion (2019 Census)	Number
Catholicism	179,316
Protestant	240,600
Evangelical Churches	122,301
African instituted Churches	34.072
Orthodox	2,304
Other Cristian	14,564
Islam	2,425
Hindu	169
Traditionists	233
Other	3,314
No Religion/Atheists	5,580
Don't Know	721
Not Stated	31

== Central Kenya Region ==
=== Urbanisation ===
Urbanisation in Central Kenya
County	Urbanisation in Central Kenya (Per cent)
Kiambu County	60.8
Nyeri County	24.5
Nyandarua County	18.5
Muranga County	16.3
Kirinyaga County	15.8
Kenya Average	32.3
Urbanisation by County in Central Kenya

Source: OpenDataKenya

=== Poverty level ===
Wealth/Poverty Level in Central Kenya
County	Poverty Level in Central Kenya (Per cent)
Kirinyaga County	20.2
Muranga County	28.5
Kiambu County	28.9
Nyeri County	32.7
Nyandarua County	46.6
Kenya Average	45.9
Poverty level by County

Source: OpenDataKenya Worldbank

== Economy ==
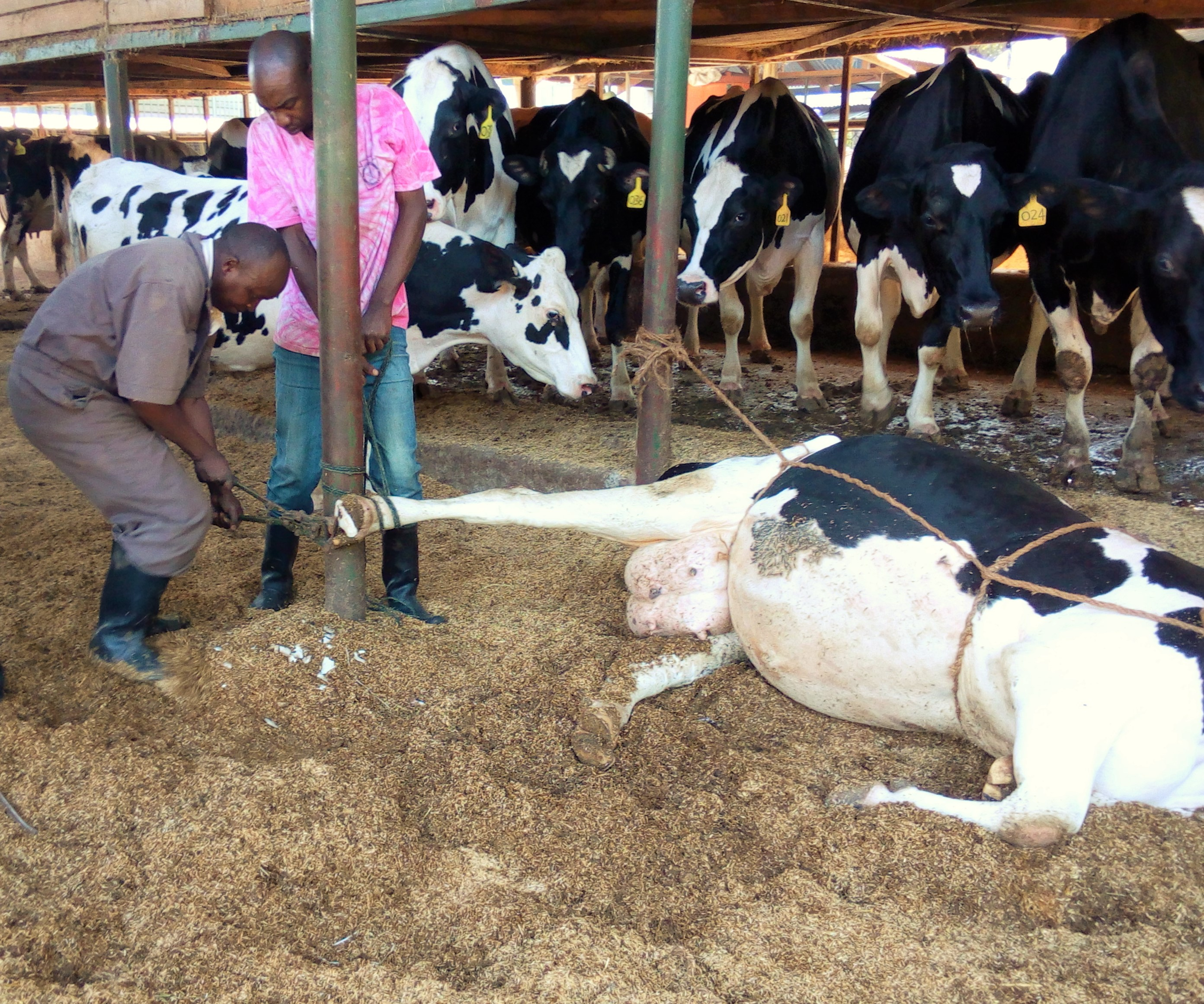
Animal husbandry in Kirinyaga County

Like most counties in the Mount Kenya region, agriculture is the main economic activity in Kirinyaga County. The county is best known for rice production from the Mwea Irrigation Scheme, which is watered by canal from the Thiba River. Coffee and tea are also grown in the cooler areas of the county. Other crops grown in the area include maize, beans, tomatoes, French beans, and other horticultural crops. Due to the scarcity of land and high population, most agriculture is done on a small scale. There is also fishing in Sagana along the Sagana River.

Kirinyaga County's business sector is growing quickly. Another significant economic feature is tourism. In 2013 Kirinyaga was ranked the second richest county in Kenya.

== Villages and settlements ==
- Difatha
- Kibingoti
- Kibirigwi
- Kinyakiiru
- Thumaita
- Mbiri
- Kiamutugu
- Muthigi-ini
- Kairini
- Mukangu
- Kianjege East and Kianjege West
- Gathoge
- Mururi
- Kianjiru
- Kimbimbi
- Part of Makutano
- Kathangarari
- Ngaru
- Kaitheri
- Kiaritha
- Kithioro
- Kerugoya town
- Gathambi
- Ndiriti
- Kandegwa
- Muragara,
- Gathigiriri
- South Ngariama (Mumbu, Kandawa, Itangi,)
