= Nyandarua County =

Coordinates: 0°33′S 36°37′E

- County
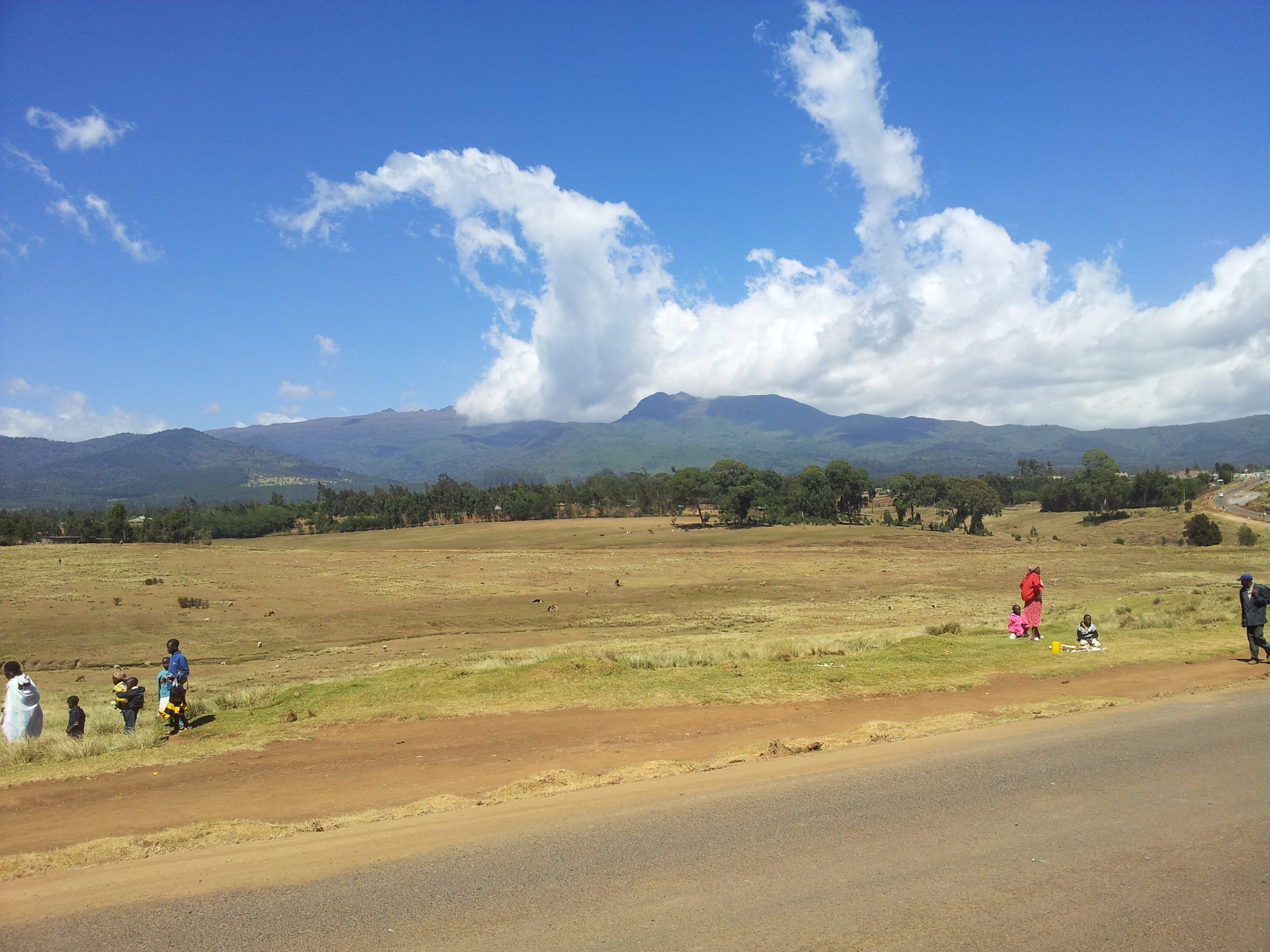
- Aberdare Ranges in Nyandarua County

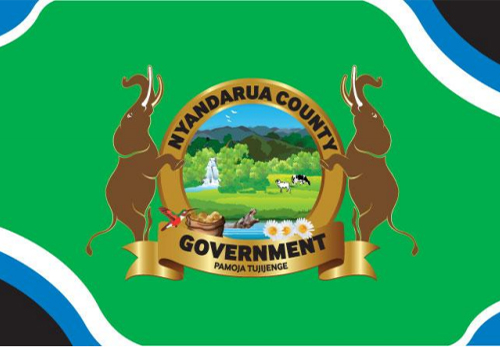
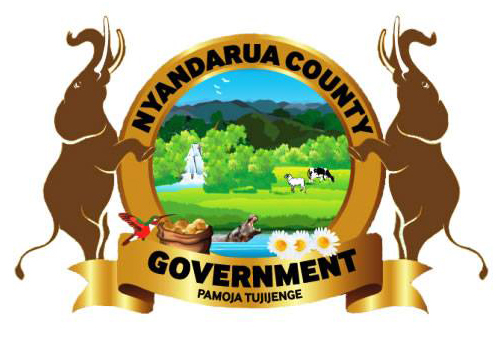
- Flag Coat of arms

- Location in Kenya
- Country: Kenya
- Formed: 4 March 2013
- Capital: Ol Kalou

Government
  - Governor: Moses Kiarie Badilisha

Area
  - Total: 3,107.7 km^{2} (1,199.9 sq mi)

Population (2019)
  - Total: 638,289
  - Density: 205.39/km^{2} (531.96/sq mi)

GDP (PPP)
  - GDP: ▲$4.618 billion (17th)(2022)
  - Per Capita: ▲$6,761 (2022) (5th)

GDP (NOMINAL)
  - GDP: ▲$1.696 billion (2022) (17th)
  - Per Capita: ▲$2,483 (2022) (5th)
- Time zone: UTC+3 (EAT)
- Website: nyandarua.go.ke

Nyandarua County is a county in Central, Kenya in the Mount Kenya region, with its capital and largest town being Ol Kalou. Formerly, the capital was Nyahururu, which is now part of Laikipia County. Nyandarua County had a population of 596,268 in 2009 and 638,289 in 2019 and covers an area of 3,304 km^{2}. The county is located on the northwestern part of the old Central Province, and contains the Aberdare Ranges.

Daniel Waithaka was elected the first governor of the County in the 2013 General Election, followed by Francis Kimemia, who was elected as the second governor in the August 2017 elections. In the 2022 general elections, Moses Ndirangu Badilisha won the seat, becoming the third Governor of Nyandarua County.

== Demographics ==
Local authorities (councils)
Authority	Type	Population*	Urban pop.*
Ol Kalou	Town	47,795	15,186
Nyandarua	County	432,107	21,868
Total	-	479,902	37,054
* 1999 census. Source:

Historical population
Year	Pop.	±%
1979	233,302	—
1989	345,420	+48.1%
1999	479,902	+38.9%
2009	596,268	+24.2%
2019	638,289	+7.0%

=== Religion ===
Religion in Nyandarua County

Religion (2019 Census)	Number
Catholicism	108,971
Protestant	193,696
Evangelical Churches	195,213
African instituted Churches	70,943
Orthodox	3,692
Other Cristian	37,672
Islam	969
Hindu	33
Traditionists	719
Other	8,766
No ReligionAtheists	14.722
Don't Know	556
Not Stated	50

== Administrative divisions ==
Administrative divisions
Sub-County	Male	Female	Intersex	Total
Kipipiri	46,113	47,740	2	93,855
Kinangop	54,727	56,697	4	111,410
Mirangine	33,447	33,766	1	67,214
Nyandarua South	46,157	47,708	5	93,870
Nyandarua North	48,486	50,210	2	90,698
Nyandarua Central	37,329	37,971	2	75262
Nyandarua West	48,752	49,209	4	98,698
Total	315,022	323,247	20	638,289
*2019 census. Sources:,

== Constituencies ==
The county has five constituencies and 25 wards

Constituency	Area km^{2}	Popn census 2009	No of Wards	Wards
Kinangop Constituency	935	192,379	8	Engineer, Gathara, North Kinangop, Murungaru, Njabini/Kibiru, Nyakio, Magumu, Githabai
Kipipiri Constituency	544	95,338	4	Wanjohi, Kipipiri, Geta, Githioro
Ol Kalou Constituency	536	120,282	5	Karau, Kanjuire Ridge, Milangine, Kaimbaga, Rurii
Ol Jorok Constituency	439	95,643	4	Gathanji, Gatimu, Weru, Charagita
Ndaragwa Constituency	655	92,626	4	Leshau/Pondo, Kiriita, Central, Shamata
Total	3,108	596,268	25	

== Health ==
Nyandarua is serviced by several government hospitals; Nyahururu, Ngano. Ol Kalou -JM Kariuki Memorial subcounty hospital, Engineer subcounty hospital and Mission hospitals funded by churches and NGOs. Several dispensaries offer health services to the county's residents, an example being Mirangine Health Centre.

County hospitals receive patients from all over the county and may refer them to Nakuru or Nyeri County Referral hospital and farther to Kenyatta National Hospital.

== Representatives ==
The county is represented by 25 elected ward representatives 5 MPs, a Women representative, a Senator and a Governor.

In 2013 presidential election the county voters voted for Uhuru Kenyatta with 237,975 a 99% of valid votes.

In the 2022 general elections, majority of the voters voted for William Samoei Ruto with 189, 513 votes, 78.76% of valid votes.

August

Members of County Assembly (In reference to August 2022 general elections)

MCA	Ward represented	Political Party
Daniel Gitau	Karau	UDA
Duncan Githinji	Gatimu	Indp
Ebarahim Maina	Murungaru	Jubilee
Elijah Mwangi	Kaimbaga	UDA
Gichuki James	Engineer	Jubilee
Hussein Kassana	Magumu	UDA
Isaac Kung'u	Wanjohi	UDA
Isaac Kamau	Githioro	UDA
James Gachomba	Njabini	Jubilee
John Thuo	Kanjuiri Range	UDA
Joseph Thuo	Gathanji	UDA
Kamwana Geoffrey	Gathara	Indp
King'ori Edinald	North Kinangop	UDA
Milkah Wanjiru	Kiriita	UDA
Paul Wambaire	Kipipiri	CCK
Paul Kiruka	Charagita	UDA
Peter Mwangi	Central	UDA
Peter Thinji	Rurii	Indp
Peter Gathungu	Leshau	UDA
Ruben Gitau	Shamata	UDA
Samuel Kaiyani	Githabai	UDA
Samuel Chege	Geta	UDA
Samuel Mathu	Mirangine	UDA
Simon Mbogo	Weru	UDA
Zachary Njeru	Nyakio	UDA

=== Legislature ===
Current Members of parliament from constituencies in the county are;

Constituency	Formation	MP Name	Political Party	Vote For	Total Vote cast	Note
Kinangop	1988	HON KWENYA	JP	57,895	80,001	
Kipipiri	1988	HON WANJIKU MUHIA	UDA	18,972	36,887	
Ol Kalou	1997	HON. KIARAHO, DAVID NJUGUNA	JP	22,201	46,120	
Ol Joro Orok	2013	HON. MUCHIRA, MICHAEL MWANGI	UDA	23,748	36,445	
Ndaragwa	1988	HON. GACHAGUA GEORGE	UDA	25,171	38,281	
Nyandarua County	2013	HON Faith Gitau	UDA	158,486	239,661	Women Representatives
Nyandarua County	2013	Governor 2013 General election.				

There were three candidates for governorship during 2013 election

Candidate	Party	Votes	Comment
Daniel Waithaka Mwangi	TNA	162,418	Winner
David Mwaniki Ngugi	GNU	19,561	
Peter Mwangi Gathimba	NARC	55,896	
Rejected Votes		2,313	
Total Cast Votes		240,188	

== 2022 General election. ==
Moses Kiarie Ndirangu Badilisha and John Mathara Mwangi won the 2022 election on a United Democratic Alliance ticket both being sworn in on 25 August 2022 at the Ol Kalou Amboretum grounds as Governor and Deputy Governor of Nyandarua County respectively.

John Methu was elected Senator through United Democratic Alliance with 185,337 votes against Theuri Kinyanjui who had 34,845 votes and the former Senator Mwangi Paul Githiomi came in third with 15,015 votes.

Faith Gitau of the United Democratic Alliance won and retained her seat by 159,621 votes against her competitors Esther Muhoho of the Jubilee Party with 40,112 and followed closely by Judy Muhia with 27,819 votes.

In constituency level, Kinangop Constituency saw Mr Kwenya Thuku retain his seat by the Jubilee Party won by 39,321 votes against Chege Mugo who garnered 34, 842 votes and vied in the United Democratic Alliance party, Ol Kalou Constituency Hon. Kiaraho, David Njuguna retained his seat with the Jubilee Party having gained 24,058 votes against United Democratic Alliance contender Sammy Ngotho, who received 19,380 votes. In Kipipiri Constituency they made history by electing the first female Member of Parliament Wanjiku Muhia who was also the First Women Representative for Nyandarua County. Jeremiah Kioni Jubilee Secretary lost his seat of ten years to George Gachagwa of United Democratic Alliance. George who got 30,180 votes against Kioni who had 7,227 votes in the Ndaragwa Constituency.

== Education ==
Children in Nyandarua can access school with ease. Schools are normally situated a walking distance mostly of less than 3 km (for primary school and high school) with a large number of public and private schools. For tertiary education they are a number of colleges and polytechnic but no university.

Education levels vary drastically with 61% of the population having reached primary school, 19% secondary school and only 2% have a tertiary education level.

One of the pioneer schools is Nyandarua high School which was opened 29 March 1965 with 71 students. Other major schools include; Kangui high School, Karima Girls, Kaheho Mix Secondary, Shamata Girls, Wanjohi Girls, Magumu High School, Pasenga Secondary School, Kagondo, Kihingo, Pioneer School-Leshau, Njabini Boys, Leshau Boys High School, St. Joseph-Mkungi Boys, Ndaragwa Girls, Ndaragwa Boys, Kisima mixed Secondary school, Nyakiambi Girls High school, Mt. Kinangop Girls school, Irigithathi Secondary school, Githunguchu Secondary school, Baari Mixed Secondary School, among others. There has been no University in Nyandarua, until Nyandarua Institute was upgraded to a university college under Dedan Kimathi University of Science & Technology. There are some Technical Institutions like Leshau Polytechnic in Ndaragwa Constituency, at Gordon Centre (Next to Kihingo Catholic Church) – Mutanga Parish And Kinagop Technical and Vocational centre in Githioro (kinagop sub county) which was launched in 2017. More Tertiary institution are needed.

== Investment challenges ==
Nyandarua County is a productive area for agriculture, manufacturing and processing. There are a number of challenges including lack of a good road network and adequate distribution of electricity and water.

Interested investors both local and in the diaspora can invest in agriculture, manufacturing, processing and housing.

Nyandarua county is famous for its agricultural productivity. Agricultural produce in terms of Maize, Beans, Irish potatoes, cabbages, spinach, kales, peas, grow in plenty, due to the fertile soils and favourable climate in the county.

== Sport ==
Nyandarua is famous for being the home of athletics such as; John Ngugi, Catherine Ndereba, Stanley Waithaka and the late Samuel Wanjiru (a one-time Olympic champion, three-time major marathon winner, one-time major marathon silver medalist, and two-time world record holder). It is also home to Benson Kariuki and Bernard Ndung'u, who are Kenya Bowling Federation champions both in Africa and globally. The county is also famous for organising cross country races at different administrative levels in attempt to nurture young athletes.

== Economy ==
Nyandarua County is the fastest growing in Kenya with a gdp growth of 10.6% as of 2022.

Nyandarua County is the 17th largest Economy in Kenya with a gdp of $4.6B at PPP and $1.6B at Nominal, Its the 5th richest county in Kenya by gdp per Capita, with a gdp per Capita of $2,482

The main economic activity in Nyandarua is farming (crop cultivation and dairy farming). In late 1990s Nyandarua was a leading producer of pyrethrum, however Kenya Pyrethrum Board the parastatal that was given the role of purchasing, processing and marketing the crop collapsed because of poor management and corruption, severely undermining the livelihood of many farmers. Nyandarua county is well known as a giant in potato farming. However, there has been a number of challenges that are associated with farming such as fluctuation of the market, poor roads, and crop diseases. Aberdare forest which covers a larger area of the country, attract local and international tourist who make a positive income to the local society. The time is now ripe for the people of Nyandarua to initiate new ways of Agribusiness. Constituencies like Ndaragwa should initiate Agribusiness that does well in semi arid areas like mangoes, millet, cassava, pumpkins and other such crops and a processing factory should be established so that the farmers get maximum returns.

== Tourism ==
Nyandarua county is famous for various tourism destination sites attracting both local and international tourists. This include the Aberdare National Park, Mount Kipipiri, Lake Ol Bolossat, Kinangop Plateau and Elephant Hill Hiking Trail.

== Central Kenya Region ==
=== Urbanisation ===
Urbanisation in Central Kenya
County	Urbanisation in Central Kenya (Per cent)
Kiambu County	60.8
Nyeri County	34.7
Nyandarua County	8.9
Muranga County	36.3
Kirinyaga County	25.8
Kenya Average	32.3
Urbanisation by County in Central Kenya

=== Wealth and poverty level ===
Poverty Level in Central Kenya
County	Poverty Level in Central Kenya (Per cent)
Kirinyaga County	34.2
Muranga County	28.5
Kiambu County	19.9
Nyeri County	26.3
Nyandarua County	76.6
Kenya Average	45.9
Poverty level by County
