= Kutus =

- Town
- Location in Kenya
- Coordinates: 0.57310°S 37.32788°E
- Country: Kenya
- County: Kirinyaga County
- Time zone: UTC+3 (EAT)

Kutus is a town in Kirinyaga County, Kenya, serving as the county's administrative headquarters.

== Geography ==
Kutus, forming part of the Kerugoya/Kutus municipality, is the county headquarters of Kirinyaga. The municipality, which also includes the township of Kerugoya, had a combined population of 39,441, with 14,056 classified as urban according to the 1999 census.

The municipality comprises six wards: Kerugoya Central, Kerugoya North, Kerugoya South, Kutus South, Kutus Central, and Nduini. Most of these wards fall under the Kerugoya/Kutus Constituency (also known as Kirinyaga Central Constituency).

== Etymology ==
The name 'Kutus' evolved from the original term 'Mūcakūthi', used by many locals to this day. The town was initially named after its founding chief, Gūtū (the Kikuyu word for 'Ear'). Over time, 'Gūtū's' place transformed linguistically, influenced by the Gichugu Dialect, into 'Kutus', aligning with the English possessive form ('s). Thus, 'Kutus' implies belonging to Gūtū.
