= Kerugoya =

Kerugoya Kiriguoya
- Town
- Kerugoya
- Location of Kerugoya in Kenya
- Coordinates: 0°30′S 37°17′E
- Country: Kenya
- County: Kirinyaga County
- Elevation: 1,548 m (5,079 ft)

Population (1999)
  - Urban: 14,056
  - Total: 39,441
- Time zone: UTC+03:00 (EAT)

Kerugoya is the largest town in Kirinyaga County, located 10 kilometres east of Karatina and 40 kilometres west of Embu. It is situated in the former Kirinyaga district. Travel directions by road from Nairobi is through Thika Road past Thika, Kenol and Makuyu (along the Thika Road). The road leads through Makutano until Sagana town, where a road branches off the East towards Kagio town up to Kirinyaga University branching North towards the town.

You can also drive through the Plains of Mwea branching east at Makutano, famous for the largest rice irrigation scheme in Eastern Africa, passing numerous communes inhabited by the Kikuyu, majority of whom practise Subsistence farming.

Kerugoya town mostly serves as an urban area to the inhabitants of Kangaita, Kimunye, Kagumo and Karia.

== Name ==
The word is Kerugoya comes from Kikuyu words 'Kiri-guoya' which means 'The fearful (Bush)'. The place was formerly covered with thick bushes and when the whites arrived in the villages, they named the so-called 'Githaka kiri guoya' (Gichugu Dialect). Hence the modern name Kerugoya.

== Administration ==
Kerugoya forms a local authority together with another township, Kutus. It is known as Kerugoya/Kutus municipality. The municipality has a population of 39,441, of whom 14,056 are classified as urban (1999 census).

The municipality has six wards: Kerugoya Central, Kerugoya North, Kerugoya South, Kutus South, Kutus Central and Nduini. Most of these wards belong to Kerugoya/Kutus Constituency. Kerugoya was also headquarters of the former Central division of Kirinyaga District.

== Education ==
A famous deaf school Kerugoya School for the Deaf is based in Kerugoya Town. Others are, Kirinyaga Township Primary School, Kerugoya Boys High School, Kerugoya Girls High School, Facing MT. Kenya High. others are Kerugoya Good shepherd academy kerugoya St. Joseph Academy and many more.

In 2011, Kenya Certificate of Primary Education Kirinyaga county mean mark was number 1 out of 47in the whole country.

The Kirinyaga University, formally known as Kirinyaga Technical Institute as well as Kirinyaga University College, is situated in Kerugoya. It received the charter to operate as an independent university in October 2016 by Kenyan president Uhuru Kenyatta among 8 other universities.

== Economy ==
Kerugoya is the biggest town in Kirinyaga County in terms of area, population, business capacity and amenities. It is associated as an economic hub of the region given the big arable farms held by local farmers: Tea, coffee, macadamia and others food stuff are among the crops grown in the upper area, as the region is most suitable for farming.

To support agricultural and dairy farming there are several agro-vet business and officers from the Ministry of Agriculture.

There are various banks (among them Equity bank, CBA, Cooperative Bank, Family Bank, Barclays Bank, Sidian Bank, Bingwa Sacco, Kirinyaga Farmers Sacco, Muhigia Sacco and FEP Bank). This shows good performance economically.

Milk production in Kirinyaga county is on the rise with many farmers favoring dairy farming for its handsome rewards. Kirima Slopes Co-operative Society buys milk from farmers and then sells it to Brookside Dairy. In the year 2014, the cooperative society which is a community-based initiative received Ksh.89 million as payment for milk sold to Brookside company.

== Transport ==
When traveling from Nairobi, the capital city, Kerugoya town is easily accessible by use of public service vehicle (Matatu). it costs an average of 250 to 300 KES and it typically takes about two hours of travel at a legal speed limit of 80 km/h. Mostly these vehicles are located in Tea Room and Nyamakima bus stages. The widely used Saccos are as follows: KUKENA, Supreme Shuttle, 2NK or Private vehicle etc.

Kerugoya has multiple gas stations such as Total, Kobil, and National Oil.
