= List of members of the National Assembly of Kenya, 2017–2022 =

Kenya's Members of 12th Parliament

National Assembly of Kenya
- 12th Parliament of Kenya

Type
- Type: Lower house of the Parliament of Kenya

Leadership
- Speaker: Justin Muturi, Jubilee Party
- Majority Leader: Amos Kimunya, Jubilee Party
- Minority Leader: Mbadi John Ng'ongo, Orange Democratic Movement

Structure
- Seats: 350
- Political groups: Government Jubilee Party (172) National Super Alliance Orange Democratic Movement (73) Wiper Democratic Movement - Kenya (23) Amani National Congress (14) FORD-K (11) Chama Cha Uzalendo (1) Other Opposition Parties Kenya African National Union (10) Independent and other (45) Speaker Jubilee Party (1)
- Length of term: 5 years

Elections
- Voting system: First-past-the-post, nominated members
- Last election: 8 August 2017

Meeting place
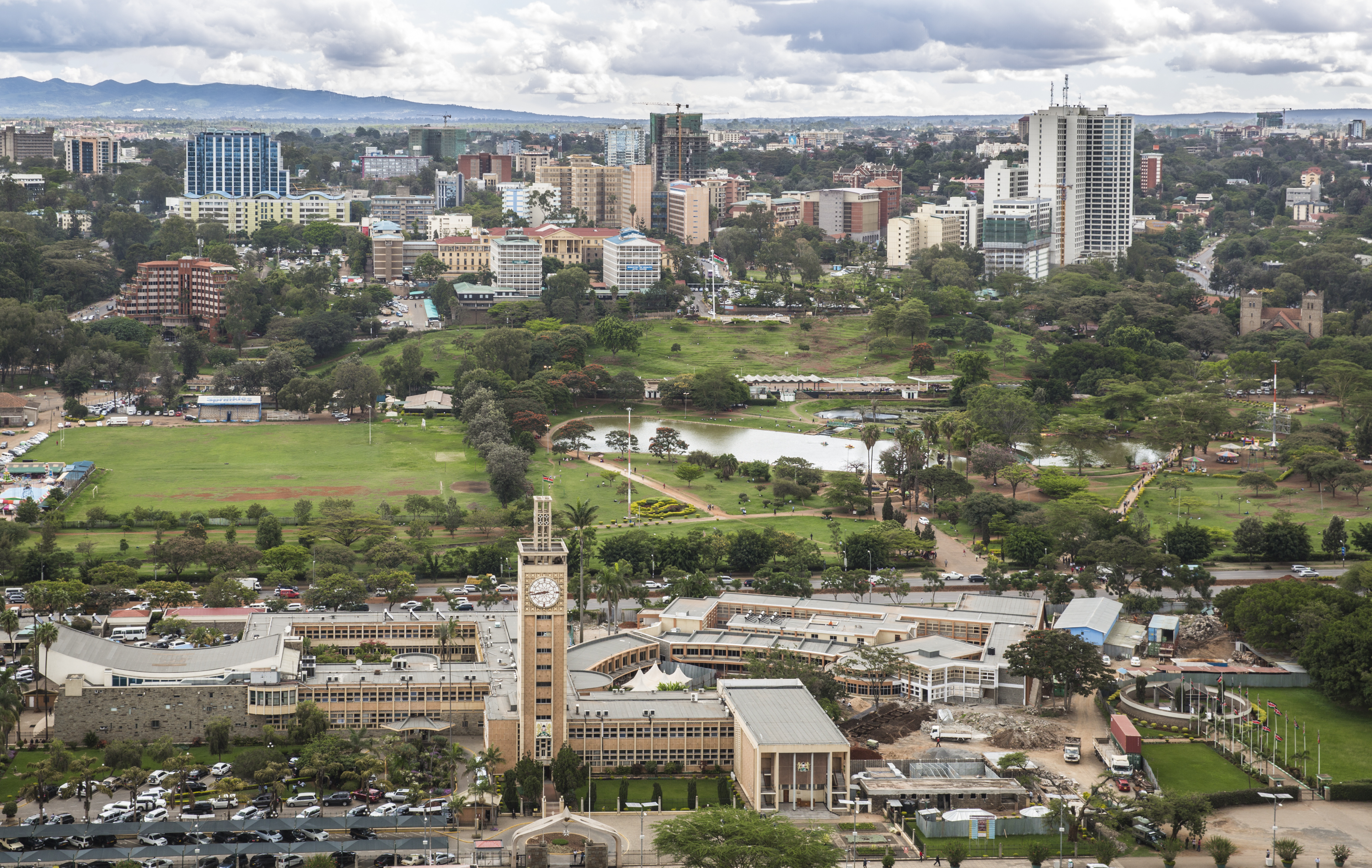
- Parliament of Kenya; Nairobi

Website
- http://www.parliament.go.ke/the-national-assembly

The Kenyan National Assembly is the lower house of the Kenyan legislature. It consists of 350 members, comprising 290 members elected from single-member constituencies, 47 woman representatives elected from each county, 12 members nominated by the political parties, and the speaker of the assembly who is elected by the assembly and serves as an ex-officio member.

The members elected in the 2017 Kenyan general election and nominated afterwards served in the 12th Parliament of Kenya.

== National Assembly Composition ==
The Jubilee Party was the largest party in the assembly with 173 seats (49%), including the Speaker. The National Super Alliance, a coalition of political parties, formed the largest opposition group. The Orange Democratic Movement was the largest opposition party

Affiliation	Members				
Affiliation	Constituency-Elected	Woman Representatives	Nominated	Speaker	Total
Jubilee	141	25	6	1	173
ODM	59	11	3		73
Wiper	19	3	1		23
Amani	12	1	1		14
FORD-K	11	1	1		13
KANU	8	2			10
EFP	4	1			5
MCC	3	1			4
Party of Development and Reforms	3	1			4
Chama Cha Mashinani	2				2
Kenya National Congress	2				2
Kenya People's Party	2				2
PDP	2				2
Chama Cha Uzalendo	1				1
Democratic	1				1
FAP	1				1
MDG	1				1
MP	1				1
National Agenda Party	1				1
New Democrats	1				1
PNU	1				1
Independent	13	1			14
vacant	1				1
Total	290	47	12	1	350

== List of members ==
=== Members elected from constituencies ===
Constituency	Member	Party
Ainabkoi	William Chepkut	Independent
Ainamoi	Sylvanus Maritim	Jubilee Party
Aldai	Cornelly Serem	Jubilee Party
Alego Usonga	Samuel Atandi	Orange Democratic Movement
Awendo	John Owino	Orange Democratic Movement
Bahati	Onesmas Ngunjiri	Jubilee Party
Balamballa	Abdi Omar Shurie	Jubilee Party
Banissa	Kulow Maalim Hassan	Economic Freedom Party
Baringo Central	Joshua Chepyegon Kandie	Maendeleo Chap Chap Party
Baringo North	William Kipkorir	Jubilee Party
Baringo South	Grace Jelagat Kipchoim (2017–18)	Jubilee Party
Baringo South	Charles Kamuren (2018–2022) (Note: Charles Kamuren was elected in a by-election in 2018 after the death of Grace Kimchoim.)	Jubilee Party
Belgut	Nelson Koech	Jubilee Party
Bobasi	Innocent Obiri	Peoples Democratic Party
Bomachoge Borabu	Zadoc Abel Ogutu	Independent
Bomachoge Chache	Miruka Ondieki Alfah	Kenya National Congress
Bomet Central	Ronald Kiprotich Tonui	Jubilee Party
Bomet East	Beatrice Pauline Cherono Kones	Jubilee Party
Bonchari	John Oyioka	Peoples Democratic Party
Bondo	Gideon Ochanda Ogolla	Orange Democratic Movement
Borabu	Ben George Orori Momanyi	Wiper Democratic Movement - Kenya
Budalangi	Raphael Bitta Sauti Wanjala	Orange Democratic Movement
Bumula	Moses Wekesa Mwambu Mabonga	Independent
Bura	Ali Wario	Jubilee Party
Bureti	Japheth Kiplangat Mutai	Jubilee Party
Butere	Nicholas Scott Tindi Mwale	Amani National Congress
Butula	Joseph H. Maero Oyula	Orange Democratic Movement
Buuri	Mugambi Murwithania Rindikiri	Jubilee Party
Central Imenti	Moses Nguchine Kirima	Jubilee Party
Changamwe	Omar Mwinyi	Orange Democratic Movement
Chepalungu	Gideon Kimutai Koske	Chama Cha Mashinani
Cherangany	Joshua Kutuny Serem	Jubilee Party
Chesumei	Wilson Kipngetich Kogo	Jubilee Party
Chuka Igambang'ombe	Patrick Munene Ntwiga	Jubilee Party
Dadaab	Mohamed Dahir Duale	Kenya African National Union
Dagoretti North	Paul Simba Arati	Orange Democratic Movement
Dagoretti South	John Kiarie Waweru	Jubilee Party
Eldama Ravine	Moses Lessonet	Jubilee Party
Eldas	Adan Keynan Wehliye	Jubilee Party
Embakasi Central	Benjamin Gathiru Mwangi	Jubilee Party
Embakasi East	Babu Owino	Orange Democratic Movement
Embakasi North	James Mwangi Gakuya	Jubilee Party
Embakasi South	Julius Musili Mawathe	Wiper Democratic Movement - Kenya
Embakasi West	George Theuri	Jubilee Party
Emgwen	Alexander Kimutai Kigen Kosgey	Jubilee Party
Emuhaya	Jeremiah Omboko Milemba	Amani National Congress
Emurua Dikirr	Johana Ngeno Kipyegon	Kenya African National Union
Endebess	Robert Pukose	Jubilee Party
Fafi	Abdikhaim Osman Mohamed	Kenya African National Union
Funyula	Wilberforce Ojiambo Oundo	Orange Democratic Movement
Galole	Said Buya Hiribae	Forum for Restoration of Democracy - Kenya
Ganze	Teddy Ngumbao Mwambire	Orange Democratic Movement
Garissa Township	Aden Duale	Jubilee Party
Garsen	Ali Wario Guyo	Wiper Democratic Movement - Kenya
Gatanga	Joseph Nduati Ngugi	Jubilee Party
Gatundu North	Annie Wanjiku Kibeh	Jubilee Party
Gatundu South	Moses Kiarie Kuria	Jubilee Party
Gem	Elisha Ochieng Odhiambo	Orange Democratic Movement
Gichugu	Robert Gichimu Githinji	Jubilee Party
Gilgil	Martha Wangari Wanjira	Jubilee Party
Githunguri	Gabriel Kago Mukuha	Jubilee Party
Hamisi	Charles Gumini Gimose	Forum for Restoration of Democracy - Kenya
Homa Bay Town	George Peter Opondo Kaluma	Orange Democratic Movement
Igembe Central	Cyprian Kubai Iringo	Jubilee Party
Igembe North	Richard Maore Maoka	Jubilee Party
Igembe South	John Paul Mwirigi	Independent
Ijara	Sophia Abdi Noor	Party for Development and Reform
Ikolomani	Benard Masaka Shinali	Jubilee Party
Isiolo North	Hassan Oda Hulufo	Kenya Patriots Party
Isiolo South	Abdi Koropu Tepo	Kenya Patriots Party
Jomvu	Bady Twalib Bady	Orange Democratic Movement
Juja	Francis Munyua Waititu	Jubilee Party
Kabete	James Githua Kamau Wamacukuru	Jubilee Party
Kabondo Kasipul	Eve Akinyi Obara	Orange Democratic Movement
Kabuchai	James Lusweti Mukwe	Forum for Restoration of Democracy - Kenya
Kacheliba	Mark Lomunokol	Party for Development and Reform
Kaiti	Joshua Kivinda Kimilu	Wiper Democratic Movement - Kenya
Kajiado Central	Elijah Memusi Kanchory	Orange Democratic Movement
Kajiado East	Peris Pesi Tobiko	Jubilee Party
Kajiado North	Joseph Manje	Jubilee Party
Kajiado South	Katoo Judah Katoo	Jubilee Party
Kajiado West	George Risa Sunkuyia	Jubilee Party
Kaloleni	Paul Kahindi Katana	Orange Democratic Movement
Kamukunji	Yusuf Hassan Abdi	Jubilee Party
Kandara	Alice Muthoni Wahome	Jubilee Party
Kanduyi	Wafula Wamunyinyi	Forum for Restoration of Democracy - Kenya
Kangema	Clement Muturi Kigano	Jubilee Party
Kangundo	Fabian Kyule Muli	Muungano Party
Kapenguria	Samwel Moroto	Jubilee Party
Kapseret	Oscar Sudi	Jubilee Party
Karachuonyo	Andrew Adipo Okuome	Orange Democratic Movement
Kasarani	Mercy Gakuya	Jubilee Party
Kasipul	Charles Ong'ondo	Orange Democratic Movement
Kathiani	Robert Mbui	Wiper Democratic Movement - Kenya
Keiyo North	James Kipkosgei Murgor	Jubilee Party
Keiyo South	Daniel Kipkogei Rono	Jubilee Party
Kesses	Swarup Ranjan Mishra	Jubilee Party
Khwisero	Christopher Aseka Wangaya	Amani National Congress
Kiambaa	John Njuguna Wanjiku	United Democratic Alliance
Kiambu	Jude L. Kangethe Njomo	Jubilee Party
Kibra	Benard Otieno Okoth	Orange Democratic Movement
Kibwezi East	Jessica Nduku Kiko Mbalu	Wiper Democratic Movement - Kenya
Kibwezi West	Patrick Mweu Musimba	Independent
Kieni	Mathenge James Kanini Kega	Jubilee Party
Kigumo	Ruth Wangari Mwaniki	Jubilee Party
Kiharu	Ndindi Nyoro	Jubilee Party
Kikuyu	Anthony Kimani Ichung'wah	Jubilee Party
Kilgoris	Gideon Sitelu Konchela	Jubilee Party
Kilifi North	Owen Yaa Baya	Orange Democratic Movement
Kilifi South	Richard Ken Chonga Kiti	Orange Democratic Movement
Kilome	Thuddeus Kithua Nzambia	Wiper Democratic Movement - Kenya
Kimilili	Didmus Wekesa Barasa Mutua	Jubilee Party
Kiminini	Chrisantus Wamalwa Wakhungu	Forum for Restoration of Democracy - Kenya
Kinango	Benjamin Dalu Stephen Tayari	Orange Democratic Movement
Kinangop	Zachary Kwenya Thuku	Jubilee Party
Kipipiri	Amos Kimunya	Jubilee Party
Kipkelion East	Kirui Joseph Limo	Jubilee Party
Kipkelion West	Hilary Kiplang’at Kosgei	Jubilee Party
Kirinyaga Central	John Munene Wambugu	Jubilee Party
Kisauni	Ali Menza Mbogo	Wiper Democratic Movement - Kenya
Kisumu Central	Fred Odhiambo Ouda	Orange Democratic Movement
Kisumu East	Shakeel Shabbir	Independent
Kisumu West	John Olago Aluoch	Forum for Restoration of Democracy - Kenya
Kitui Central	Benson Makali Mulu	Wiper Democratic Movement - Kenya
Kitui East	Nimrod Mbithuka Mbai	Jubilee Party
Kitui Rural	David Mwalika Mboni	Chama Cha Uzalendo
Kitui South	Rachael Kaki Nyamai	Jubilee Party
Kitui West	Edith Vethi Nyenze	Wiper Democratic Movement - Kenya
Kitutu Chache North	Jimmy Nuru Ondieki Angwenyi	Jubilee Party
Kitutu Chache South	Richard Momoima Onyonka (Note: The election in Kitutu Chache South was postponed until November 2017 due to the death of a candidate.)	Forum for Restoration of Democracy - Kenya
Kitutu Masaba	Shadrack John Mose	Jubilee Party
Konoin	Yegon Brighton Leonard	Jubilee Party
Kuresoi North	Moses Kipkemboi Cheboi	Jubilee Party
Kuresoi South	Joseph Tonui Kipkosgei	Jubilee Party
Kuria East	Marwa Kemero Maisori Kitayama	Jubilee Party
Kuria West	Mathias Nyamabe Robi	Jubilee Party
Kwanza	Ferdinard Kevin Wanyonyi	Forum for Restoration of Democracy - Kenya
Lafey	Abdi Mude Ibrahim	Economic Freedom Party
Lagdera	Mohamed Hire Garane	Kenya African National Union
Laikipia East	Amin Deddy Mohamed Ali	Jubilee Party
Laikipia North	Sarah Paulata Korere	Jubilee Party
Laikipia West	Patrick Kariuki Mariru	Jubilee Party
Laisamis	Marselino Malimo Arballe	Jubilee Party
Lamu East	Sharif Athman Ali	Jubilee Party
Lamu West	Stanley Muiruri Muthama	Maendeleo Chap Chap Party
Langata	Nixon Kiprotich Korir	Jubilee Party
Lari	Jonah Mburu Mwangi	Jubilee Party
Likoni	Mishi Juma Khamisi Mboko	Orange Democratic Movement
Likuyani	Enoch Wamalwa Kibunguchy	Forum for Restoration of Democracy - Kenya
Limuru	Peter Mungai Mwathi	Jubilee Party
Loima	Jeremiah Ekamais Lomorukai	Orange Democratic Movement
Luanda	Christopher Omulele	Orange Democratic Movement
Lugari	Ayub Savula Angatia	Amani National Congress
Lunga Lunga	Khatib Abdallah Mwashetani	Jubilee Party
Lurambi	Titus Khamala Mukhwana	Amani National Congress
Maara	Japhet Miriti Kareke Mbiuki	Jubilee Party
Machakos Town	Victor Kioko Munyaka	Jubilee Party
Magarini	Michael Thoyah Kingi	Orange Democratic Movement
Makadara	George Aladwa Omwera	Orange Democratic Movement
Makueni	Daniel Kitonga Maanzo	Wiper Democratic Movement - Kenya
Malava	Moses Malulu Injendi	Jubilee Party
Malindi	Aisha Jumwa Karisa Katana	Orange Democratic Movement
Mandera East	Omar Mohamed Maalim Hassan	Economic Freedom Party
Mandera North	Bashir S. Abdullah	Jubilee Party
Mandera South	Adan Haji Ali	Jubilee Party
Mandera West	Adan Haji Yussuf	Economic Freedom Party
Manyatta	John Muchiri Nyaga	Jubilee Party
Maragwa	Mary Wamaua Waithira Njoroge	Jubilee Party
Marakwet East	David Kangogo Bowen	Jubilee Party
Marakwet West	William Kipkemoi Kisang	Jubilee Party
Masinga	Joshua Mbithi Mwalyo	Wiper Democratic Movement - Kenya
Matayos	Geoffrey Makokha Odanga	Orange Democratic Movement
Mathare	Anthony Tom Oluoch	Orange Democratic Movement
Mathioya	Peter Kimari Kihara	Jubilee Party
Mathira	Rigathi Gachagua	Jubilee Party
Matuga	Kassim Sawa Tandaza	Amani National Congress
Matungu	Justus Murunga Makokha	Amani National Congress
Matungulu	Stephen Mutinda Mule	Wiper Democratic Movement - Kenya
Mavoko	Patrick Makau King'ola	Wiper Democratic Movement - Kenya
Mbeere North	Charles Muriuki Njagagua	Jubilee Party
Mbeere South	Geoffrey Kingagi Muturi	Jubilee Party
Mbooni	Erastus Kivasu Nzioka	New Democrats
Mogotio	Daniel Kamuren Tuitoek	Jubilee Party
Moiben	Silas Kipkoech Tiren	Jubilee Party
Molo	Francis Kuria Kimani	Jubilee Party
Mosop	Vincent Kipkurui Tuwei	Jubilee Party
Moyale	Qalicha Gufu Wario	Jubilee Party
Msambweni	Suleiman Dori (2017–20) (Note: Suleiman Dori died on 9 March 2020.)	Orange Democratic Movement
Msambweni	Feisal Bader (2020–22)	Independent
Mt. Elgon	Fred Kapondi Chesebe	Jubilee Party
Muhoroni	James Onyango Oyoo	Orange Democratic Movement
Mukurweini	Anthony Githiaka Kiai	Jubilee Party
Mumias East	Benjamin Jomo Washiali	Jubilee Party
Mumias West	Johnson Manya Naicca	Orange Democratic Movement
Mvita	Abdullswamad Sherrif Nassir	Orange Democratic Movement
Mwala	Vincent Musyoka Musau	Maendeleo Chap Chap Party
Mwatate	Andrew Mwadima	Orange Democratic Movement
Mwea	Josphat Kabinga Wachira	Jubilee Party
Mwingi Central	Gideon Mutemi Mulyungi	Wiper Democratic Movement - Kenya
Mwingi North	Paul Musyimi Nzengu	Wiper Democratic Movement - Kenya
Mwingi West	Charles Ngusya Nguna	Wiper Democratic Movement - Kenya
Naivasha	Jayne Njeri Wanjiru Kihara	Jubilee Party
Nakuru Town East	David Gikaria	Jubilee Party
Nakuru Town West	Samuel Arama	Jubilee Party
Nambale	Sakwa John Bunyasi	Amani National Congress
Nandi Hills	Alfred Kiptoo Keter	Jubilee Party
Narok East	Lemanken Aramat	Jubilee Party
Narok North	Richard Moitalel Kenta	Orange Democratic Movement
Narok South	Korei Lemein	Jubilee Party
Narok West	Gabriel Koshal Tongoyo	Chama Cha Mashinani
Navakholo	Emmanuel Wangwe	Jubilee Party
Ndaragwa	Jeremiah Ngayu Kioni	Jubilee Party
Ndhiwa	Martin Peters Owino	Orange Democratic Movement
Ndia	George Macharia Kariuki	Jubilee Party
Njoro	Charity Kathambi Chepkwony	Jubilee Party
North Horr	Francis Chachu Ganya	Frontier Alliance Party
North Imenti	Abdul Rahim Dawood	Jubilee Party
North Mugirango	Joash Nyamache Nyamoko	Jubilee Party
Nyakach	Joshua Aduma Owuor	Orange Democratic Movement
Nyali	Mohamed Ali Mohammed	Independent
Nyando	Jared Odoyo Okelo	Orange Democratic Movement
Nyaribari Chache	Richard Nyagaka Tongi	Jubilee Party
Nyaribari Masaba	Ezekiel Machogu Ombaki	National Agenda Party of Kenya
Nyatike	Tom Mboya Odege	Orange Democratic Movement
Nyeri Town	Martin Deric Ngunjiri Wambugu	Jubilee Party
Ol Jorok	Michael Mwangi Muchira	Jubilee Party
Ol Kalou	David Njuguna Kiaraho	Jubilee Party
Othaya	James Gichuki Mugambi	Jubilee Party
Pokot South	David Losiakou Pkosing	Jubilee Party
Rabai	William Kamoti Mwamkale	Orange Democratic Movement
Rangwe	Lillian Gogo	Orange Democratic Movement
Rarieda	Otiende Amollo	Orange Democratic Movement
Rongai	Kipruto Moi	Kenya African National Union
Rongo	Paul Abuor	Orange Democratic Movement
Roysambu	Isaac Waihenya Ndirangu	Jubilee Party
Ruaraka	Kajwang Tom Joseph Francis	Orange Democratic Movement
Ruiru	Simon Nganga Kingara	Jubilee Party
Runyenjes	Eric Muchangi Njiru	Jubilee Party
Sabatia	Alfred Agoi Masadia	Amani National Congress
Saboti	Caleb Amisi Luyai	Orange Democratic Movement
Saku	Dido Ali Raso	Jubilee Party
Samburu East	Lentoi Joni L. Jackson Lekumontare	Kenya African National Union
Samburu North	Alois Musa Lentoimaga	Jubilee Party
Samburu West	Josephine Naisula Lesuuda	Kenya African National Union
Seme	James Wambura Nyikal	Orange Democratic Movement
Shinyalu	Justus Gesito Mugali M'mbaya	Orange Democratic Movement
Sigor	Peter Lochakapong	Jubilee Party
Sigowet Soin	Kipsengeret Koros	Independent
Sirisia	John Waluke Koyi	Jubilee Party
Sotik	Dominic Kipkoech Koskei	Jubilee Party
South Imenti	Kathuri Murungi	Independent
South Mugirango	Silvanus Osoro Onyiego	Kenya National Congress
Soy	Caleb Kipkemei Kositany	Jubilee Party
Starehe	Charles Kanyi Njagua	Jubilee Party
Suba North	Millie Grace Akoth Odhiambo	Orange Democratic Movement
Suba South	Mbadi John Ng'ongo	Orange Democratic Movement
Subukia	Samuel Kinuthia Gachobe	Jubilee Party
Suna East	Junet Sheikh Nuh	Orange Democratic Movement
Suna West	Peter Francis Masara	Independent
Tarbaj	Ahmed Bashane Gaal	Party for Development and Reform
Taveta	Naomi Shaban	Jubilee Party
Teso North	Edward Oku Kaunya	Amani National Congress
Teso South	Geoffrey Omuse	Orange Democratic Movement
Tetu	James Gichuhi Mwangi	Jubilee Party
Tharaka	George Gitonga Murugara	Democratic Party of Kenya
Thika Town	Patrick Kimani Wainaina Jungle	Independent
Tiaty	William Kamket Kassait	Kenya African National Union
Tigania East	Josphat Gichunge Mwirabua Kabeabea	Party of National Unity
Tigania West	John Kanyuithia Mutunga	Jubilee Party
Tinderet	Julius Kibiwott Melly	Jubilee Party
Tongaren	David Eseli Simiyu	Forum for Restoration of Democracy - Kenya
Turbo	Janet Jepkemboi Sitienei	Independent
Turkana Central	John Lodepe Nakara	Orange Democratic Movement
Turkana East	Lokiru Ali Mohammed	Orange Democratic Movement
Turkana North	Christopher Doye Nakuleu	Jubilee Party
Turkana South	Ekomwa Lomenen James	Jubilee Party
Turkana West	Daniel Epuyo Nanok	Jubilee Party
Ugenya	Chris Karan (2017–18) (Note: Chris Karan's election was nullified by the Supreme Court of Kenya in 2018. David Ochieng was elected in a by-election in 2019)	Orange Democratic Movement
Ugenya	David Ouma Ochieng (2018–2022)	Movement for Democracy and Growth
Ugunja	James Opiyo Wandayi	Orange Democratic Movement
Uriri	Mark Ogolla Nyamita	Orange Democratic Movement
Vihiga	Ernest Ogesi Kivai	Amani National Congress
Voi	Jones Mwagogo Mlolwa	Orange Democratic Movement
Wajir East	Rashid Kassim Amin	Wiper Democratic Movement - Kenya
Wajir North	Ahmed Abdisalan Ibrahim	Orange Democratic Movement
Wajir South	Mohamud Sheikh Mohamed	Jubilee Party
Wajir West	Ahmed Kolosh Mohamed	Orange Democratic Movement (2017–19)
Wajir West	Ahmed Kolosh Mohamed	Jubilee Party (2019–2022) (Note: Ahmed Kolosh Mohamed left the Orange Democratic Movement and joined the Jubilee party in 2019.)
Webuye East	Bernard Alfred Wekesa Sambu	Amani National Congress
Webuye West	Daniel Wanyama Sitati	Jubilee Party
West Mugirango	Vincent Kemosi Mogaka	Forum for Restoration of Democracy - Kenya
Westlands	Tim Wanyonyi	Orange Democratic Movement
Wundanyi	Danson Mwashako Mwakuwona	Wiper Democratic Movement - Kenya
Yatta	Charles Kilonzo	Independent

=== Woman representatives ===
County	Member	Party
West Pokot	Lilian Tomitom	Jubilee Party
Wajir	Fatuma Gedi Ali	Party of Development and Reforms
Vihiga	Beatrice Adagala	Amani National Congress
Uasin Gishu	Gladys Boss Shollei	Jubilee Party
Turkana	Joyce Emanikor	Jubilee Party
Trans Nzoia	Janet Nangabo Wanyama	Jubilee Party
Tharaka–Nithi	Beatrice Nkatha	Jubilee Party
Tana River	Rehema Hassan	Maendeleo Chap Chap Party
Taita Taveta	Lydia Haika Mnene Mizighi	Jubilee Party
Siaya	Christine Ombaka Oduor	Orange Democratic Movement
Samburu	Maison Leshoomo	Kenya African National Union
Nyeri	Rahab Mukami Wachira	Jubilee Party
Nyandarua	Faith Wairimu Gitau	Jubilee Party
Nyamira	Jerusha Mongina Momanyi	Jubilee Party
Narok	Roselinda Soipan Tuiya	Jubilee Party
Nandi	Tecla Tum	Jubilee Party
Nakuru	Chelule Liza	Jubilee Party
Nairobi City	Esther Muthoni Rosanna Passaris	Orange Democratic Movement
Muranga	Maitu Sabina Wanjiru Chege	Jubilee Party
Mombasa	Asha Hussein Mohamed	Orange Democratic Movement
Migori	Pamela Awuor Ochieng	Orange Democratic Movement
Meru	Kawira Mwangaza	Independent
Marsabit	Safia Sheikh Adan	Jubilee Party
Mandera	Amina Gedow Hassan	Economic Freedom Party
Makueni	Rose Museo Mumo	Wiper Democratic Movement - Kenya
Machakos	Joyce Kamene	Wiper Democratic Movement - Kenya
Lamu	Ruweida Mohamed Obo	Jubilee Party
Laikipia	Catherine Wanjiku Waruguru	Jubilee Party
Kwale	Zuleikha Juma Hassan	Orange Democratic Movement
Kitui	Irene Muthoni Kasalu	Wiper Democratic Movement - Kenya
Kisumu	Rozaah Akinyi Buyu	Orange Democratic Movement
Kisii	Janet Ong'era	Orange Democratic Movement
Kirinyaga	Purity Wangui Ngirici	Jubilee Party
Kilifi	Gertrude Mbeyu Mwanyanje	Orange Democratic Movement
Kiambu	Gathoni Wa Muchomba	Jubilee Party
Kericho	Florence C.K. Bore	Jubilee Party
Kakamega	Elsie Busihile Muhanda	Orange Democratic Movement
Kajiado	Janet Marania Teyiaa	Jubilee Party
Isiolo	Rehema Dida Jaldesa	Jubilee Party
Homa Bay	Gladys Wanga	Orange Democratic Movement
Garissa	Anab Mohamed Gure	Jubilee Party
Embu	Jane Wanjuki Njiru	Jubilee Party
Elgeyo/Marakwet	Jane Jepkorir Kiptoo Chebaibai	Jubilee Party
Busia	Florence Mwikali Mutua	Orange Democratic Movement
Bungoma	Catherine Wambilianga	FORD - Kenya
Bomet	Joyce Korir Chepkoech	Jubilee Party
Baringo	Gladwell Jesire Cheruiyot	Kenya African National Union

=== Nominated members ===
The 2010 Kenyan constitution provides for 12 members to be nominated by the political parties to represent women, youth, people with disabilities, and workers. Parties can nominate members according to their proportional representation in the house.

Member	Party
Wilson Sossion	Orange Democratic Movement
Sammy Kipkorir Seroney	Wiper Democratic Movement - Kenya
Jacquiline Adhiambo Oduol	Orange Democratic Movement
Nasri Sahal Ibrahim	FORD - Kenya
Maina Kamanda	Jubilee Party
Jennifer Shamalla	Jubilee Party
Halima Yussuf Mucheke	Jubilee Party
Godfrey Osotsi	Amani National Congress
Gideon Keter	Jubilee Party
Dennitah Ghati	Orange Democratic Movement
David Ole Sankok	Jubilee Party
Cecily Mutitu Mbarire	Jubilee Party

== Speaker and Deputy Speaker ==
The Speaker of the National Assembly is elected by the parliament and serves as an additional ex-officio member. The speaker from 2017 to 2022 was Justin Muturi. Moses Cheboi of the Jubilee Party was elected unopposed as deputy speaker.

== Party leadership ==
Aden Duale was chosen by the Jubilee Party as the majority leader in 2017. He served in this office until he was replaced by Amos Kimunya in 2020. The majority whip was Emmanuel Wangwe.

John Mbadi of the Orange Democratic Movement was the minority leader. Junet Mohammed served as minority whip.
