= Joyce Chepkoech Korir =

Kenyan politician

Joyce Chepkoech Korir Honourable

Former County women representative for Bomet County
- Preceded by: Cecilia Ng'etich
- Succeeded by: Linet Toto

Mayor, Bomet Municipality
- Preceded by: Leonard Barsumei
- Succeeded by: Erick Mutai

Deputy Mayor, Bomet Municipality

Personal details
- Born: Joyce Chepkoech; 1 July 1981 (age 44)
- Party: Jubilee Party (JP)
- Spouse: Leonard Korir (died 2016)
- Children: 4
- Education: Tendwet Primary School; Mugango Secondary
- Alma mater: Kenya Institute of Legal Studies; Jomo Kenyatta University of Agriculture and Technology (JKUAT)
- Occupation: politician

Joyce Chepkoech Korir is a Kenyan politician who was the Women Representative for Bomet County in the 12th Parliament of Kenya from 2017 to 2022. She was also the first female mayor of Bomet Municipality and served in this position between 2007 and 2013.

== Background and education ==
Korir attended Tendwet Primary School between 1987 and 1995. Later on she enrolled at Mugango Secondary for her schooling between 1996 and 1999 before joining the Kenya Institute of Legal Studies in 2004 from which she obtained a Certificate of Legal Studies. She then received a Diploma in County Governance from the Jomo Kenyatta University of Agriculture and Technology in 2014.

== Career ==
In 2007, Korir was the elected Councillor for Singorwet Ward as well as a Deputy Mayor. In 2011, she was elected the first female Mayor of Bomet Municipality and served as Mayor until 2013.

Under the Jubilee Party in 2017, Korir, who was then Bomet County Assembly Deputy Speaker contested for and won the office of Woman Representative in Kenya's 12th Parliament replacing Cecilia Ng'etich.

== Personal life ==
Korir was married to Leonard Korir who died in 2016.

== See also ==
- List of members of the National Assembly of Kenya, 2017–present
- Jubilee Party
