= Jerusha Mongina Momanyi =

Kenyan politician (born 1956)

- Born: 12 December 1956 (age 69)
- Education: Nairobi University
- Occupation: politician
- Political party: Jubilee Party

Jerusha Mongina Momanyi (born 12 December 1956) is a Kenyan politician who was elected to parliament in 2017.

== Life ==
She was born in 1956. She attended Rigoma Girls Secondary School and Masaba High School in the 1980s. She became a qualified primary school teacher at a teacher training college. From 1992 to 2008 she was employed as a teacher at first Itongo Sengera Primary School and then at Rigoma Primary School.

In 2003 she began studies at Nairobi University and she graduated in 2008 as a Bachelor of Education. She later studied for a master's degree in Distant Education.

From 2013 to 2017 she was a member of the County Nyamira County Assembly. She joined the Jubilee Party. In 2017 she was elected to the National Assembly. She joined the Kenya Women Parliamentary Association (KEWOPA). In April 2025 she was at a KEWOPA meeting at Borabu Comprehensive School to protest about gender-based violence. Other KEWOPA members present included Ruth Odinga who is the MP for the (Kisumu Central Constituency) and Beatrice Adagala who represents the Vihiga Constituency.

In 2025, she was part of a campaign to get her elected as governor. She was supported by Pamela Njoki who is also an MP.
