= Lilian Tomitom =

Kenyan politician

Lilian Cheptoo Tomitom is a Kenyan Jubilee Party politician who is currently a member of the National Assembly as county woman representative for West Pokot County.

She attended Kacheliba Mixed Secondary School and Moi University before working as a university administrator. She was elected to the national assembly in 2017.

== Election results ==
General election 2017: West Pokot
Party	Candidate	Votes	%
Jubilee	Lilian Cheptoo Tomitom	62,785	41.6
KANU	Catherine chepkemoi Mukenyang	52,988	35.1
Independent	Rodah Chepkopus Rotino	23,703	15.7
The National Vision Party	Emily Chesang Partany	2,849	1.9
Party Of National Unity	Teresa Peter Lokichu	2,568	1.7
Chama Cha Mashinani	Regina Chang'orok	2,535	1.7
ODM	Lilian Janice Plapan	1,411	0.9
Amani	Bridgid Florence Clement	839	0.6
Independent	Night Cherop Chongorio	716	0.5
Maendeleo Chap Chap Party	Mary Rikiriko	613	0.4
Majority		9,797	6.5
