= Catherine Wanjiku Waruguru =

Kenyan politician

Women's Representative Laikipia County
- In office 31 August 2017 – 9 August 2022
- Preceded by: Jane Machira Apolos
- Succeeded by: Jane Kagiri

Nominated Member of the Laikipia County Assembly
- In office 2013–2017

Personal details
- Born: 1987 (age 38–39)
- Party: DCP

Catherine Wanjiku Waruguru is a Kenyan politician from Laikipia County. She was elected the women's representative for Laikipia County in the 12th Parliament, and a Nominated member of the first Laikipia County Assembly.

== Education ==
Catherine earned her KCSE from Kanyama High School, before proceeding to Karatina Institute of Theological College where she gained a diploma in Theology. She also earned a diploma in Business Management from the Kenya Institute of Management. She further gained a certification in Public Relations from the Institute of Commercial Management, before gaining a Bachelors Degree in Business Management from Karatina University in 2016.

== Political career ==
Waruguru was nominated to the Laikipia County Assembly, on a TNA ticket, in the 2013 General Elections. In 2017, she successfully vied for the Women's representative seat in Laikipia County on a Jubilee Party ticket. During the 12th Parliament of Kenya, she was the Vice-Chaiperson of the National Assembly's Members & Services Facilities Committee, and a member of the Departmental Committee on Lands. She also launched a program in her home county to train youths in constrauction, in partnership with the National Industrial Training Institute. She challeneged incumbent Amin Deddy for the Laikipia East Constituency seat in the 2022 general elections, but the seat was won by Mwangi Kiunjuri.
