= Joyce Emanikor =

Kenyan politician

Joyce Akai Emanikor is a Kenyan politician who is currently a member of the National Assembly as the county woman representative for Turkana County. She is a member of the Jubilee Party.

She studied at Daystar University and the University of Manchester before working at OXFAM and UNICEF. She was elected to parliament in 2013.

== Election results ==
General election 2017: Turkana
Party	Candidate	Votes	%
Jubilee	Joyce Akai Emanikor	53,731	40.9
ODM	Pauline Akai Lokuruka	49,433	37.6
Independent	Jecinta Ngasike Abenyo	12,731	9.7
Chama Cha Mashinani	Beatrice Asukul Nakusa	12,106	9.2
Independent	Rhoda Arupe Loyor	2,016	1.5
Maendeleo Chap Chap Party	Cicilia Nangetei Namulen	1,319	1.0
Majority		4,298	3.3
