= Gladwell Jesire Cheruiyot =

Kenyan politician

Honorable Gladwell Jesire Cheruiyot

County Woman Repr wayesentative of Baringo County
- Incumbent
- Assumed office 8 September 2022
- President: William Ruto

Personal details
- Born: Gladwell Jesire Cheruiyot Baringo County, Kenya
- Party: Kenyan Africa National Union(KANU)
- Education: Kisii University
- Occupation: Politician

Gladwell Jesire Cheruiyot is a Kenyan politician and a current member of the Kenyan Africa National Union (KANU) party since 2017. She is the former Women Representative for Baringo County.

== Education ==
She attended the Kisan Primary School where she obtained her Kenya Certificate of Primary Education (KCPE) from 1982 to 1989. She obtained her Kenya Certificate of Secondary Education (KCSE) in Kituro Secondary School from 1990 to 1993. Between 1995 and 1998 she obtained a Diploma in Pharmacy in Kenya Medical Training College (KMTC). She also attended Kisii University where she obtained a Bachelor of Arts in Criminology.

== Political career ==
Gladwell Jesire served at the Kenya Ministry of Health from 2003 to 2017 as Senior Pharmacy Technician. She was elected in the Kenyan National Assembly as the Baringo County Member of Parliament since 2017 till date. She is a member of the Departmental Committee on Health and a member of the Parliamentary Powers and Privileges Committee. She supports Girls running away from female genital mutilations, distributing sanitary pads and empowering the girls to grow into productive individuals, she also trains women and people living with disabilities to lead normal lives. She advocates for the interests of women in by ensuring that the needs of women and girls as a special interest group are addressed as the National Assembly transacts its business as the Women Representative.
