= Chepalungu Constituency =

Kenyan electoral constituency

Chepalungu
- constituency for the Parliament of Kenya
- Chepalungu Constituency within Bomet County

- Bomet County within Kenya
- County: Bomet
- Population: 164,837
- Area: 461 km^{2} (178.0 sq mi)

Current constituency
- Number of members: 1
- Party: CCM
- Member of Parliament: Victor Koech
- Wards: 5

Chepalungu Constituency is an electoral constituency in Kenya. It is one of five constituencies of Bomet County. The constituency was established for the 1966 elections.

== Members of Parliament ==
Elections	MP	Party	Notes
1966	Alfred Kimunai Arap Soi	KANU	
1969	Paul Tamason Arap Barmalel	KANU	One-party system
1974	Alfred Kimunai Arap Soi	KANU	One-party system
1979	John Kipsang Arap Koech	KANU	One-party system
1983	John Kipsang Arap Koech	KANU	One-party system
1988	John Kipsang Arap Koech	KANU	One-party system
1990	Alfred Kimunai Arap Soi	KANU	By-election, one-party system
1992	John Kipsang Arap Koech	KANU	General Election Multi-party
1997	Isaac Kiprono Arap Rutto	KANU	General Election
2002	John Kipsang Arap Koech	KANU	General Election
2007	Isaac Kiprono Arap Rutto	ODM	General Election
2013	Paul Savimbi Arap Bii	URP	General Election
2017	Gideon Kimutai Arap Koskei	CCM	General Election
2022	Victor Kipng'etich Arap Koech Mandazi	CCM	General Election

== Wards ==
Ward	Member of County Assembly	Notes
Nyangores	Joseah Samoei	
Chebunyo	Hon. Kiprotich Cheplanget	
Sigor	Peter Mutai	
Siongiroi	Kibet Bursar	
Kong'asis	Dennis Kiplangat Arap Ngeno	
Total Voters		
*January 2021.

== See also ==
- Bomet Central Constituency
- Sotik Constituency
- Konoin Constituency
- Bomet East Constituency
