= Catherine Wambilianga =

Kenyan politician

Women Representative for Bungoma County
- Incumbent
- Assumed office 2017

Personal details
- Party: Forum for the Restoration of Democracy – Kenya

Catherine Nanjala Wambilianga is a Kenyan politician. She is a member of the FORD–Kenya party.

== Political career ==
She was elected women's representative in the National Assembly from Bungoma County in the 2017 general election. She was re-elected in 2022.

== Personal life ==
In 2021, she was seriously injured in a car crash while campaigning.

== See also ==
- List of members of the National Assembly of Kenya, 2017–2022
- 13th Parliament of Kenya
