= Tecla Tum =

Kenyan politician

Tecla Chebet Tum is a Kenyan politician who is currently Director of gender in the office of the President, She is a Former member of the National Assembly as county woman representative for Nandi County. She was a member of the Jubilee Party and currently UDA party.

She studied at University of Nairobi, Moi University and Denver University and worked at Moi University as a lecturer before her election to the National Assembly in 2017. She is a member of the Departmental Committee on Administration & National Security and the Departmental Committee on Sports, Tourism & Culture.

== Election results ==
General election 2017: Nandi
Party	Candidate	Votes	%
Jubilee	Tecla Chebet Tum	247,696	92.1
Progressive Party Of Kenya	Nolega Valtine Nandoya	13,051	4.9
KANU	Jane Chebet	8,055	3.0
Majority		234,645	87.3
