= Lydia Haika =

Kenyan politician

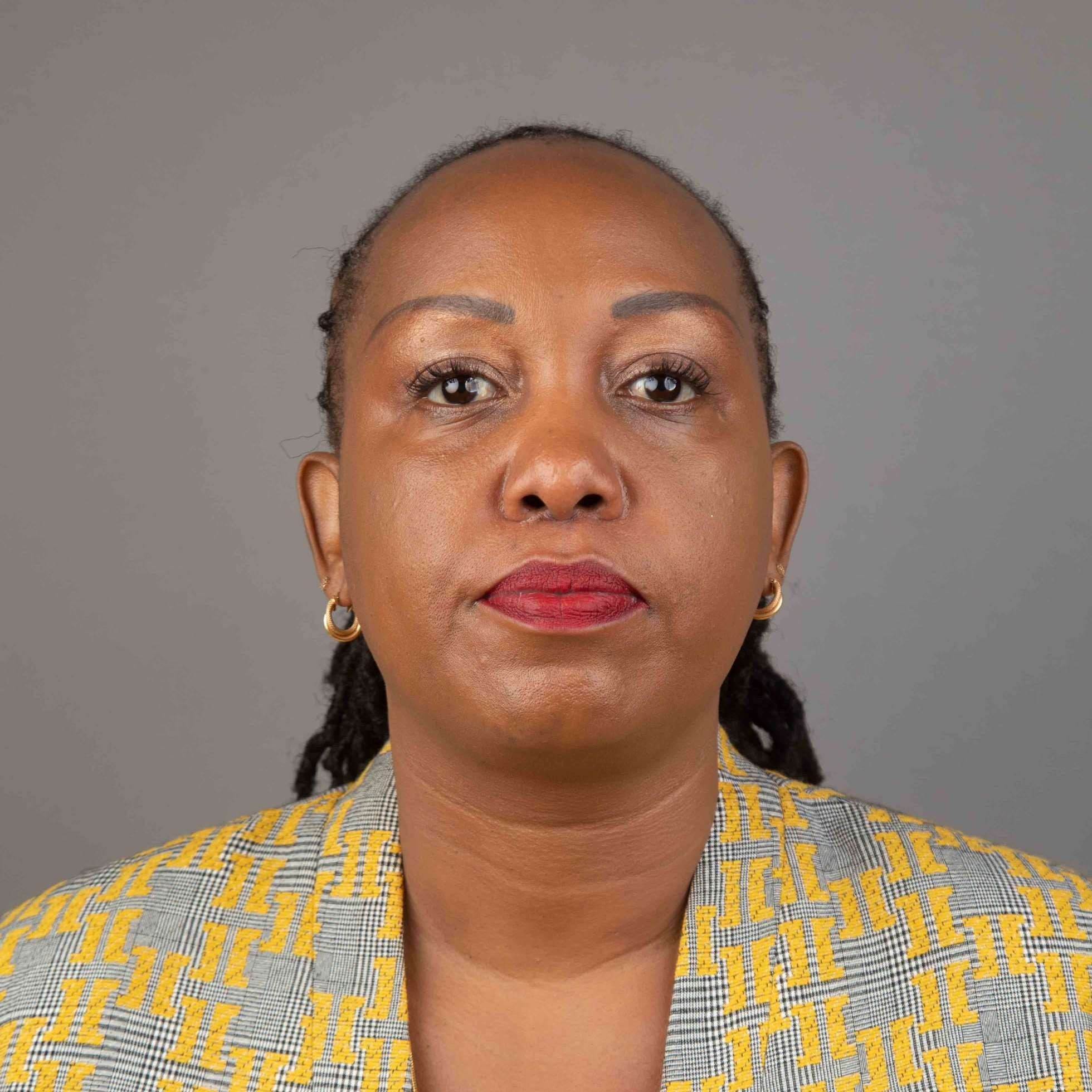

County woman representative for Taita–Taveta County
- Incumbent
- Assumed office 31 August 2017

Personal details
- Party: United Democratic Alliance

Lydia Haika Mnene Mizighi is a Kenyan politician from the United Democratic Alliance. She is women's representative in the National Assembly from Taita–Taveta County.

== See also ==
- List of members of the National Assembly of Kenya, 2017–2022
- 13th Parliament of Kenya
