= Kawira Mwangaza =

Kenyan politician

Governor of Meru County
- In office August 2022 – 14 March 2025
- Deputy: Isaac Mutuma
- Preceded by: Kiraitu Murungi
- Succeeded by: Isaac Mutuma

Women's Representative for Meru County
- In office 2017–2022
- President: Uhuru Kenyatta

Personal details
- Born: Meru County, Kenya
- Profession: Politician

Kawira Mwangaza is a Kenyan politician, who served as the Governor of Meru County from August 2022 until 14th March, 2025 when her impeachment case was upheld by the High Court of Kenya. Previously she served as the Women's Representative for Meru County in the 12th Parliament of Kenya. She was the 3rd Governor of Meru County from August 2022 to 21 August, 2024. She was impeached by the MCAs on 21 August, 2024 despite a spirited attempt by her legal team to convince the Senate of Kenya of her innocence in light of the multiple allegations of abuse of office and incompetence against her. The High Court of Kenya upheld Kawira Mwangaza's impeachment on 15th March, 2025 and Her deputy, Isaac Mutuma was sworn in as the 4th Governor of Meru County on 17th March, 2025.

== See also ==
- List of members of the National Assembly of Kenya, 2017–2022
