= Bomet University College =

University in Kenya

Bomet University is a constituent of Moi University and was established 27 July 2017, and chartered on 4 February 2026. Bomet University is the first public university in Bomet County and is strategically placed at the heart of Bomet town. Its establishment is a step towards the realization of a fully-fledged University in line with the government policy to establish at least one University in every County in Kenya.

The first cohort of GSSP students were admitted on 31 August 2016 to Bomet College and over the years the students’ population has grown to over 8,000. BU in the initial stages started with five programmes of Moi University and this is envisaged to grow to 11 schools and five centres of research in the next five years. BU endeavours to develop creativity and innovation to enable students to fit in the job market, by taking a practical approach to learning emphasizing the element of attachments and fieldwork in the training of its students and integrating ICT in their learning.

Nine years after its establishment, Bomet University College was granted a Charter on Wednesday 4 February 2026, making it independent from Moi university. The institution becomes the 36th public university to be awarded the charter in the country.

== Bomet University ==
The Chairman of Council for Bomet University is Prof. John O. Shiundu while the Vice Chancellor is Prof. Charles Mutai.
