= Faith Gitau =

Kenyan politician

Faith Gitaū
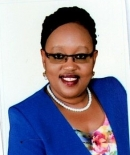

Women Representative for Nyandarua County
- Incumbent
- Assumed office 2017

Personal details
- Born: Faith Wairimū Gitaū
- Party: UDA

Faith Wairimū Gitaū is a Kenyan politician. She is a member of the United Democratic Alliance (UDA).

== Political career ==
She was elected women's representative in the National Assembly from Nyandarua County in the 2017 general election. She was re-elected in 2022.

== See also ==
- List of members of the National Assembly of Kenya, 2017–2022
- 13th Parliament of Kenya
