= Abdi Omar Shurie =

Kenyan politician

Abdi Omar Shurie is a Kenyan politician from the Jubilee Party. In the elections of 2017 and 2022, he was elected to the National Assembly in Balambala Constituency. The constituency is in Garissa County. In 2024 Hon Shurie was awarded 1st Class Honours Chief of the Order of the Burning spear, CBS by President William Ruto.

== See also ==
- 12th Parliament of Kenya
- 13th Parliament of Kenya
