= Sabina Chege =

Kenyan politician (born 1978)

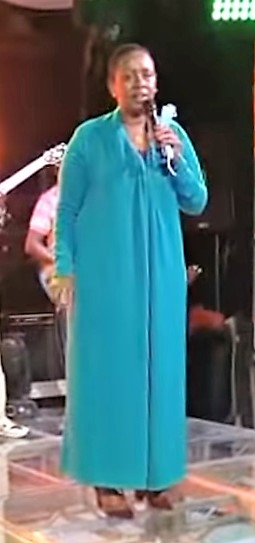

Nominated MP to National Assembly
- Incumbent
- Assumed office 8 September 2022

Woman Representative for Murang'a County
- In office 28 March 2013 – 8 September 2022
- Preceded by: Position established
- Succeeded by: Beatrice Maina

Personal details
- Born: Sabina Wanjirū Chege; 22 August 1978 (age 48)
- Party: Jubilee Party
- Education: University of Nairobi

Sabina Wanjirū Chege (born 22 August 1978) is a Kenyan politician and former television actress and radio presenter who is a member of the Kenyan Parliament.

She served as the Woman Representative in the National Assembly for Murang'a County (2013–2022).

== Education and early career ==
Sabina Wanjirū Chege attended Our Lady Consolata Mūgoiri Girls High School in Murang'a County, and thereafter the Kenya Institute of Management and the University of Nairobi, where she obtained a Bachelor of Education degree and a master's degree in communication. Prior to entering politics, she was an actress in the television soap Tausi, where she played the role of Rehema. She subsequently worked as a radio presenter on Coro FM and in radio management at Kameme FM and Kenya Broadcasting Corporation. She is married with three children.

== Political career ==
She was elected to the National Assembly as a women's representative for Mūrang'a County in 2013 with 96.6% of the vote. She was a member of the National Alliance party. In the 2017 general election, she was re-elected, now as a member of the Jubilee Party. The Jubilee party was formed in 2016 as a successor to the Jubilee Alliance, a coalition of several political parties, including Chege's National Alliance party. In her first term in parliament she was chairperson of the Departmental Committee on Education, Research & Technology and a member of the Constitutional Implementation Oversight Committee. Since 2017 she has served as chairperson of the Parliamentary Committee on Health.

In 2019 she sponsored the Kenya National Blood Transfusion Service Bill which commercialized blood transfusions and created a new national body to coordinate blood donations nationally. This move was criticized by the Kenya National Union of Medical Laboratory Officers. She also sponsored the Breastfeeding Mothers Bill that would require employers to provide facilities and breaks for employees who were breastfeeding. In September 2024, she sponsored the Horticultural Crops Authority Bill 2024 that sought to introduce licensing, regulation, postharvest handling, and marketing by a Horticultural Crops Authority. The bill was controversial and has since not been passed to law.

She was succeeded by Beatrice Njeri Maina in the 2022 Kenyan general elections for the Mūrang'a Women Rep position. She had declared an interest in becoming the running mate for Kenyan Deputy President William Ruto in the 2022 presidential election. She then supported Raila Odinga.

In May 2023, she pledged allegiance to President William Ruto. for disloyalty, former president Uhuru Kenyatta expelled her from the Jubilee party.

=== Election results ===
General election 2017: Murang'a
Party	Candidate	Votes	%
Jubilee	Maitu Sabina Wanjiru Chege	391,825	77.4
Independent	Evelyn Waithira Nyoike	114,684	22.6
Majority		277,141	54.7
Turnout			

General election 2013: Murang'a
Party	Candidate	Votes	%
National Alliance	Sabina Wanjiru Chege	402,380	96.6
Kenya National Congress	Mercy Wanjiku Kimwe	8,510	2
ODM	Hellen Njeri Kiarie	5,832	1.4
Majority		393,870	94.5
Turnout			

== See also ==
- Murang'a County
- Parliament of Kenya
