= Kagiri =

Kagiri may refer to:

- Jane Kagiri, Kenyan politician
- Kono Yo no Kagiri, Japanese single
