= Oscar Sudi =

Kenyan politician

Oscar Sudi MP

Member of Parliament for Kapseret
- Incumbent
- Assumed office 4 March 2013
- Majority: 27,601 (55.6%)

Personal details
- Party: UDA Party

Oscar Kipchumba Sudi is a Kenyan politician who is currently a member of the National Assembly representing Kapseret constituency, found in Uasin Gishu county. He is a member of the ruling party, United Democratic Alliance (UDA), and a close ally to the fifth President of Kenya, William Ruto.

== Political career ==
=== Member of Parliament ===
From 2013 to 2017 he was a member of the Departmental Committee on Lands, the Constitutional Implementation Oversight Committee and the Procedure and House Rules Committee. Since 2017, he has been a member of the Departmental Committee on Energy.

==== Election results ====
General election 2017: Kapseret
Party	Candidate	Votes	%
Jubilee	Oscar Kipchumba Sudi	35,340	71.1
KANU	John Joseph Rono Kipkurui	7,739	15.6
Independent	John Kipkoech Rotich	4,818	9.7
Labour Party of Kenya	Christopher Kiplagat Serem	1,060	2.1
Independent	Joel Kipkemboi Bett	714	1.4
Majority		27,601	55.6

== Controversy ==
=== Hate Speech ===
In September 2020, he was accused of hate speech towards Kenyan president Uhuru Kenyatta and a disturbance occurred when locals used logs and stones to prevent police from accessing his home to arrest him. He surrendered himself to a police station on 13 September.

=== Forged Academic Credentials & Botched Police Investigation ===
In September 2016, Sudi was reported to have presented forged academic papers to IEBC and EACC with an intention to deceive the two commissions that he had requisite credential to be allowed to vie as MP. In October 2016, he was charged in court with forgery of academic papers for presenting a fake diploma certificate from Kenya Institute of Management and a fake KCSE certificate from Highway High School, and was released on bail.In May 2022, former Highway High School principal testified in court that Sudi did not sit for any KCSE exam in 2006 as he had claimed in the forgeries.In June 2024, Oscar Sudi was acquitted of academic forgery charges due to a botched police investigation, which had been conducted in a hotel. Sudi has maintained his Member of Parliament seat with the forgeries.

=== Parliamentary Record ===
While serving as Member of Parliament, Sudi has been described in media and public commentary as having zero participation in plenary debates in the National Assembly of Kenya, as reflected in Hansard records of parliamentary proceedings. He has been controversially known to only yawn and drink water during plenary debates in the house throughout his parliamentary career.
