= Nyamai =

Nyamai is a Kenyan surname. Notable people with the surname include:

- Charles Mutisya Nyamai, Kenyan politician
- Kaloki Nyamai, Kenyan painter and sculptor
- Rachael Kaki Nyamai (born 1976), Kenyan politician
