= Pamela Awuor Ochieng =

Women Representative for Migori County
- In office 31 August 2017 – 2022
- Constituency: Migori County

Personal details
- Education: Bachelor of Education (Arts); Master of Business Administration (MBA); PhD in Business Administration
- Alma mater: Kenyatta University; Jomo Kenyatta University of Agriculture and Technology
- Occupation: Politician
- Profession: Business Administrator
- Known for: Serving as Women Representative for Migori County in the 12th Parliament of Kenya

Pamela Awuor Ochieng (also known as Dr. Pamela Odhiambo) was a Kenyan female politician, who represented the county of Migori as the Woman Representative to the National Assembly of Kenya from 2017 to 2022, under the Orange Democratic Movement (ODM).

== Education background ==
Pamela Awuor Ochieng holds a Bachelor of Education (B.Ed., Arts) as well as a Master in Business Administration (MBA), both attained at the University of Nairobi. She pursued her advanced studies at the University of Jomo Kenyatta of Agriculture and Technology (JKUAT), where she obtained a Doctorate (PhD) in Business Administration. In an intervention at the National Assembly in February 2020, she highlighted her academic journey by paying tribute to the former president Daniel Arap Moi for his support to children from disadvantaged backgrounds, affirming that it is largely thanks to the education access policies that she was able to attain a doctoral degree.

== Career ==
During the August 2017 general elections, Pamela Awuor Ochieng won the seat for women representative (Women Representative) for Migori County situated in the west of Kenya, on the Orange Democratic Movement (ODM), the opposition party of Raila Odinga. She took up her seat on 31 August 2017.

During the 12th legislative assembly of Kenya (2017–2022), Pamela Awuor Ochieng actively participated in parliamentary works. According to the Mzalendo parliamentary observation platform, she has expressed herself on 148 occasions during the sessions of the National Assembly. Her speeches have focused on a wide range of subjects, including the rights of minority groups, the funds for community development (NG-CDF) and questions related to the condition of women in the county of Migori.

She has particularly expressed herself on the question of the Uwezo Fund, a Governmental initiative aimed at the economic empowerment of women, by clarifying the respective competencies of the representatives of women and of the constituency parliamentarians in the management of this initiative.

During the August 2022 general elections, Pamela Awuor Ochieng did not retain her seat. The seat for the woman representative for Migori County was taken by Fatuma Zainab Mohammed, an independent candidate, who defeated the official ODM candidate, former Migori Woman Member of Parliament Dennitah Ghati. This victory made Fatuma Mohammed the first woman elected on an independent list in the Nyanza region, the traditional stronghold of the ODM.

Pamela Awuor Ochieng a regularly participated in public debates and media discussions related to Local Governance and electoral issues. She has notably expressed herself on the weak voter mobilisation in Kenya, attributing this disaffection to a loss of confidence of citizens in the Independent Electoral Commission (IEBC).

She is also a member of Kisii University council.

== See also ==
- Migori County
- Orange Democratic Movement
- National Assembly of Kenya
- Women Representatives in Kenya
