= Konoin Constituency =

Kenyan electoral constituency

Konoin
- constituency for the Parliament of Kenya
- Konoin Constituency within Bomet County

- Bomet County within Kenya
- County: Bomet
- Population: 163,507
- Area: 393 km^{2} (151.7 sq mi)

Current constituency
- Number of members: 1
- Party: UDA
- Member of Parliament: Yegon Brighton Leonard
- Wards: 5

Konoin Constituency is an electoral constituency in Bomet County, Kenya. It is one of five constituencies in Bomet County and was one of three constituencies of the former Buret District. The constituency has seven wards, all electing councillors for the Bureti County Council. The constituency was established for the 1988 elections. The Konoin Technical Training Institute is located within the constituency.

== Members of Parliament ==
| Elections | MP | Party | Notes |
|---|---|---|---|
| 1988 | Nathaniel K. arap Chebelyon | KANU | One-party system. |
| 1990 | John K.Terer | KANU | By-election. One-party system. |
| 1992 | Nathaniel K. arap Chebelyon | KANU | |
| 1997 | Raphael K. A. Kitur | KANU | |
| 2002 | Sammy Cheruiyot Koech | KANU | |
| 2007 | Julius Kipyegon Kones | ODM | |
| 2013 | Sammy Cheruyot Koech | URP | |
| 2017 | Lenny Brighton Yegon alias LapaaTaa | JP | |
| 2022 | Lenny Brighton Yegon | UDA | |

== Wards ==
Wards
| Ward | Registered Voters |
| Boito | 5,743 |
| Embomos | 3,149 |
| Kimulot | 6,699 |
| Chepchabas | Unknown as of now |
| Mogogosiek | 7,277 |
| Total | 48,919 |
*September 2005.

== See also ==
- Bomet Central Constituency
- Chepalungu Constituency
- Sotik Constituency
- Bomet East Constituency
