= Khatib Mwashetani =

Kenyan politician

Khatib Abdalla Mwashetani is a Kenyan politician and former MP of Lunga Lunga Constituency in Kwale County, Kenya. He was first elected in the 2013 Kenyan General Elections as a member of the FORD-Kenya party. He was re-elected in the 2017 elections under the Jubilee Party.

Mwashetani ran for re-election in the 2022 elections as part of the UDA party, but ultimately lost the seat to Mangale Chiforomodo of the UDM party.

In 2025 he was appointed by President William Ruto as the non-executive chairperson of the Board of Directors of the National Transport and Safety Authority (NTSA). Mwashetani replaces Timothy Bosire, treasurer of the ODM, who declined the appointment by Ruto.
