= Bomet Central Constituency =

Constituency in Bomet County

Bomet Central
- constituency for the Parliament of Kenya
- Bomet Central Constituency within Bomet County

- Bomet County within Kenya
- County: Bomet
- Population: 175,215
- Area: 286 km^{2} (110.4 sq mi)

Current constituency
- Number of members: 1
- Party: UDA
- Member of Parliament: Richard Kilel
- Wards: 5

Bomet Central is a constituency in Kenya inhabited by the Kipsigis community. It is one of five constituencies in Bomet County. It has a population of 175,215 as of 2019 and an area of approximately 286 km^{2} (110 sq mi).

== Administrative and political units ==
Bomet central is headed by member of parliament Hon Cheruiyot Richard Kilel and has five county assembly wards namely Silibwet Township, Singorwet, Ndarawetta, Chesoen and Mutarakwa.

=== Members of parliament ===
Elections	MP	Party	Notes
2013	Ronald Kiprotich Tonui	Jubilee Party	
2017	Ronald Kiprotich Tonui	Jubilee Party	Re
2022	Richard Cheruiyot Kilel	UDA	

== Agriculture ==
The main economic activity practiced in the area is farming, some of the crops grown include tea, sweet potatoes and maize.

== See also ==
- Sotik Constituency
- Chepalungu Constituency
- Konoin Constituency
- Bomet East Constituency
