= Sotik Constituency =

Kenyan electoral constituency

Sotik
- constituency for the Parliament of Kenya
- Sotik Constituency within Bomet County

- Bomet County within Kenya
- County: Bomet
- Population: 227,855
- Area: 544 km^{2} (210.0 sq mi)

Current constituency
- Number of members: 1
- Party: UDA
- Member of Parliament: Francis Sigei
- Wards: 5

Sotik Constituency is an electoral constituency in Kenya established for the 1997 elections. It is one of five constituencies in Bomet County. Sotik has one major river, River Kipsonoi. Sotik is also a hilly place with the main crops being grown are tea and maize. The Nairobi Kisii highway passes through Sotik. Recently, many developments have occurred; Sotik Market was put up by the former governor Hon Isaac Ruto, since then infrastructure has been improving. Sotik is also a religious center with over 10 churches set up in the area, e.g., Bethel AGC, St Joseph's Sotik catholic church and Gustavo D' Kerich chapel.

== History ==
Sotik would have been Abagusii and Maasai territory before 1800 but with a treaty put forward by Menya arap Kisiara, the Maasai migrated to Narok; and in the 1830s the arrival of the three sons of arap Turgat from Nandi; led to a forceful and violent eviction of the Abagusii from the reaches of Bureti (Kapkatet), to Keroka which has a meaning of 'look at home' in Kipsigis dialect.

The arrival of the three sons of arap Turgat was followed by the arrival of the British and the Kipsigis rallied alongside the Nandi and resisted the construction of the Uganda railway; which upon the death of Koitalel and by the agenda of the church against the Orgoik, the Kipsigis signed the Lumbwa Treaty which saw the end of their resistance against the British.

Sotik in its initial status was a stretch of plains where big game was practiced. It is in American records that America's 26th President:- Theodore Roosevelt Jr. liked to use the 405 Winchester centerfire rifle cartridge and on occasion killed lions. Sotik later became an agricultural district producing: Tea, Pyrethrum, Cotton, maize and dairy products.

Sotik is understood by the Belgut Kipsigis to be a general term for Bomet and its residents (Usually derogative as Bomet Kipsigis, especially those from Trans-Mara are seen to be primitive and conservative- An attitude with roots from Lubwa treaty). This is because Bomet town used to be called Sot, only to be changed to Bomet because it used to host an industry scale slaughter house during early post Independence period.

== Members of Parliament ==
| Elections | MP | Party | Notes |
|---|---|---|---|
| 1997 | Anthony Kipkoskei Arap Kimeto | KANU | |
| 2002 | Anthony Kipkoskei Arap Kimeto | KANU | |
| 2007 | Lorna Chepkemoi Laboso | ODM | Laboso died alongside Kipkalya Kones in an air crash in June 2008. |
| 2008 | Joyce Cherono Laboso | ODM | By-election |
| 2013 | Joyce Cherono Laboso | URP | General Election |
| 2017 | Dominic Kipkoech Arap Koskei(Sotet Junior) | JP | He is the son of former MP Anthony Kipkosgei Arap Kimeto(Sotet) |
| 2022 | Francis Kipyegon Arap Sigei | UDA | Sigei won the seat after trying to capture the seat five times. |

== Wards ==
Wards
| Ward | Registered Voters(2022 elections) | Current Member of County Assembly (MCA) |
| Rongena Manaret | 12,034 | Rosaline Cheptoo |
| Chemagel | 18,870 | Busienei Dennis Kiprotich |
| Kipsonoi | 17,736 | Peter Ronoh |
| Kapletundo | 20,992 | Nathan Kibet |
| Ndanai Abosi | 17,049 | Kirui Paul Kipyegon |

== See also ==
- Bomet Central Constituency
- Chepalungu Constituency
- Konoin Constituency
- Bomet East Constituency
