= Jennifer Shamalla =

Kenyan politician

Member of the National Assembly
- In office 2017–2022
- Constituency: nominated member

Personal details
- Political party: Jubilee Party

Jennifer Shamalla is a Kenyan lawyer and politician from the Jubilee Party. She was a nominated member of the National Assembly.

== See also ==
- List of members of the National Assembly of Kenya, 2017–2022
