= Julius Kipyegon Kones =

Kenyan statistician and politician

Julius Kones

Chairman National Water Conservation & Pipeline Corporation
- In office 10 January 2014 – Present

Member of Parliament for Konoin constituency
- In office December 2007 – March 2013

Personal details
- Born: 1972 (age 53–54) Bomet County, Kenya
- Education: Moi University (BSc); Moi University (MSc); University of Nairobi (PhD)

Julius Kipyegon Kones (born 1972) is a Kenyan statistician and politician. He serves as the Chairman of the Board of Directors of National Water Conservation & Pipeline Corporation. He also served as the Member of Parliament for Konoin constituency, Bomet County in Rift Valley Kenya.

== Background ==
Dr. Kones was born and raised in Cheptalal village, Bomet County. He went to Kitala Primary School and later joined Kaboson Secondary School in Bomet District in the year 1986. He has a PhD in Statistics from the University of Nairobi, a Master and Bachelor of Science degrees in Mathematics and Statistics from Moi University.

== Political career ==
In the 2007 General Elections, Dr Kones was elected to represent the Konoin Constituency in the 10th parliament of Kenya. The former statistics lecturer at the University of Nairobi says he had given little thought to running for an elective position but some residents pushed him into it. He was initially skeptical about contesting but made up his mind only four weeks into party nominations. The former politician owes his past political success to his grassroots connections and his academic credentials.

On 27 December 2013, President Uhuru Kenyatta appointed Dr Kones the Chairman of National Water Conservation and Pipeline Corporation.
