= Christine Ombaka =

Kenyan politician

Christine Ombaka Oduor

Women's Representative
- In office 2017–Incumbent
- Constituency: Siaya County

Personal details
- Party: Orange Democratic Movement
- Education: Isles International University, Lancaster University, University of Nairobi
- Occupation: Politician

Christine Ombaka Oduor is a Kenyan politician from the Orange Democratic Movement.

== Education ==
Ombaka has graduated from the following institutions:

- Isles International University
- Lancaster University
- University of Nairobi

== Political career ==
Ombaka was elected women's representative in the National Assembly from Siaya County in the 2017 general election. She was re-elected in the 2022 general election.
