= Jane Jepkorir Kiptoo Chebaibai =

Kenyan Politician

Woman Representative for Elgeyo Marakwet County
- In office 31 August 2017 – 2022

Personal details
- Party: Jubilee Party United Democratic Alliance
- Education: Alphax College
- Alma mater: African International University
- Occupation: Politician

Jane Jepkorir Kiptoo Chebaibai is a Kenyan politician who served as the Woman Representative for Elgeyo Marakwet County in the National Assembly. She previously worked in the public service and was appointed chairperson of the Board of Directors of Bomas of Kenya.

== Early life and education ==
Chebaibai attended Kimnai Primary School, where she obtained her Kenya Certificate of Primary Education. She later studied at Moi Girls Kapsowar, earning her Kenya Certificate of Secondary Education in 1996. In 2016, she obtained a certificate from Alphax College. She holds a bachelor's degree in psychology from African International University.

== Career ==
Before becoming a politician, Chebaibai worked in public service. She served as a clerical officer at Kenya Railways from 2002 to 2005. She later joined the Kenya Prisons Service, where she worked as a constable from 2006 to 2017.

On 10 February 2023, she was appointed chairperson of the Board of Directors of Bomas of Kenya by President William Ruto.

=== Political career ===
In the 2017 Kenyan general election, Chebaibai was elected as Woman Representative for Elgeyo Marakwet County on a Jubilee Party ticket, assuming office on 31 August 2017. She contested re-election in the 2022 general election representing United Democratic Alliance (UDA) but lost to independent candidate Caroline Ngelechei, who won with 104,928 votes against Chebaibai's 58,928 votes.

During her tenure in the 12th Parliament (2017–2022), she served on the Departmental Committee on Sports, Tourism and Culture and the Committee on National Cohesion and Equal Opportunity.
