= Nkubu =

Town in Meru County, Kenya

Coordinates: 0°04′S 37°40′E

Nkubu is a town in Kenya. It is located on the eastern slopes of Mount Kenya, within Meru County. It falls in one of the most-fertile and best-watered parts of Africa, with tea, coffee and dairy farming as the main economic activities in the area. It is also the lead town in South Imenti Constituency.

== Location ==
Nkubu is 211 kilometres (131 miles) from Nairobi on the Nairobi-Embu-Meru road. The town is situated on the southern banks of the river Thingithu, which has its origins on Mount Kenya. Transport includes public service minibuses, taxis and boda boda motorbikes. The town is connected to surrounding towns, by tarred roads to Chuka, Meru and Mikumbune, Kithurine, Kionyo towns to the west and a tarred toad to Mitunguu town to the east.

== Economy ==
The town is a trade hub with several businesses, and several banks: Equity Bank, Family Bank, Cooperative bank, Kenya Commercial Bank and the Yetu Sacco Bank, Capital Sacco Bank, Times U Sacco and Bimas. There are three major hospitals, Nkubu Consolata Mission hospital jekim hospital and Kanyakine district hospital, 4 kilometres (2.5 miles) away. The infrastructure developments initiated by the Senator Kiraitu Murungi has made the place attractive to entrepreneurs and buildings are coming up overnight.

Nkubu is the home of South Imenti Tea Farmers Sacco, a bank with the tallest building in East and Central Kenya. The building houses the Nkubu campus of Mount Kenya University.

== Educational institutions ==
Education institutions in the town include, Nkubu High school, St.Pius x Seminary, Nkubu Primary school, Stella Maris mission day and boarding primary school, Winners Academy, Kenrama Educational Centre, Nkubu Youth Polytechnic, Kanyakine Boys' Boarding school and Kaguru Agricultural Training Centre. The town is involved in commercial banana production.

Some of the estates in the town's outskirts include Taita, Kiigene, Kaguru and Muthaiga (Muguru).
