= Meru County =

County in Kenya

Meru
- County
- Meru County
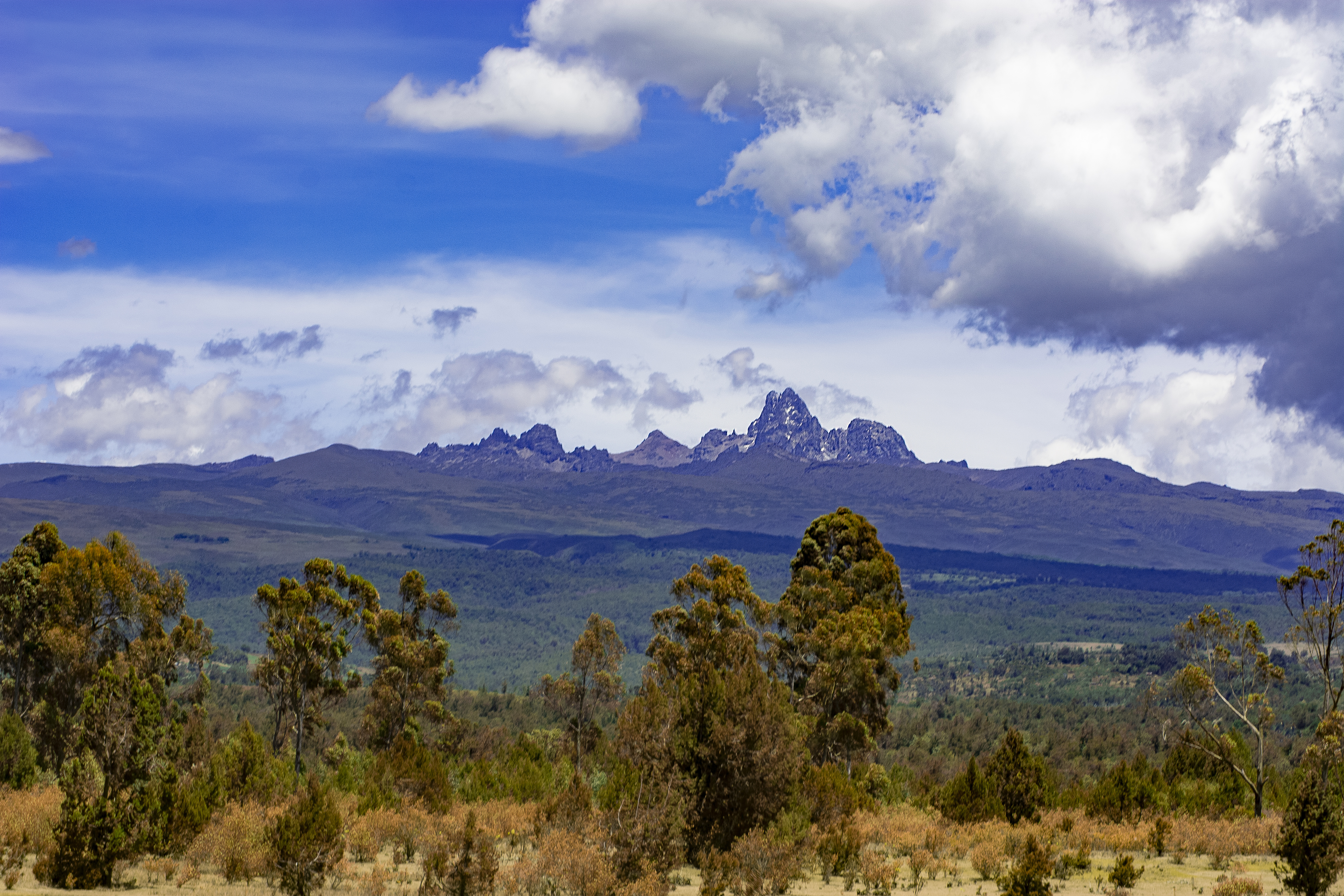
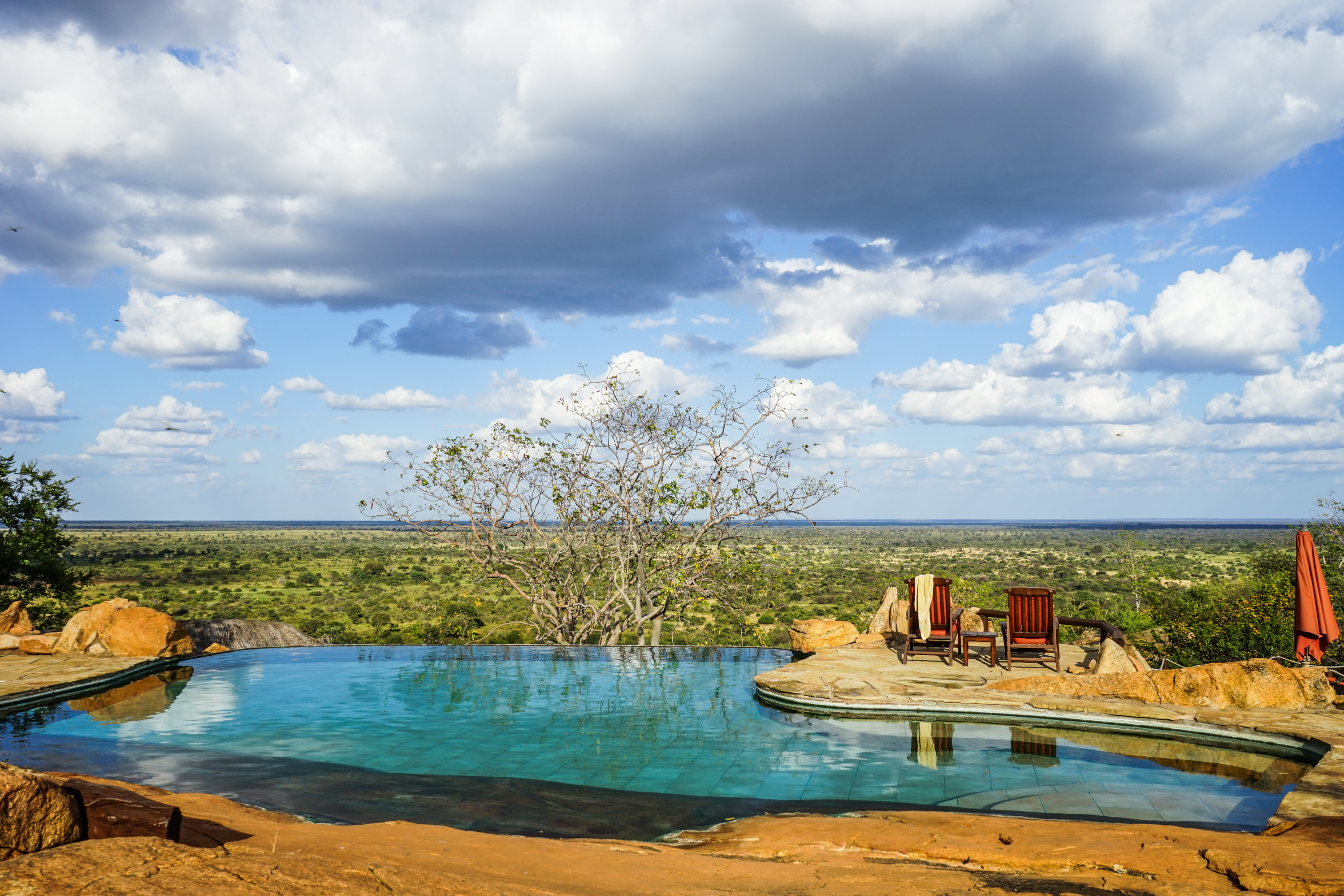
- From Top to bottom: Mount Kenya and Meru National Park

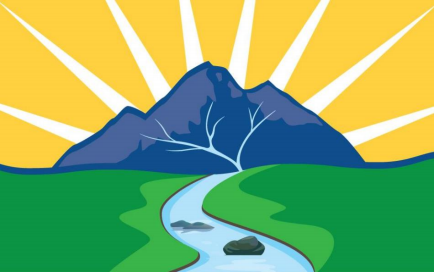
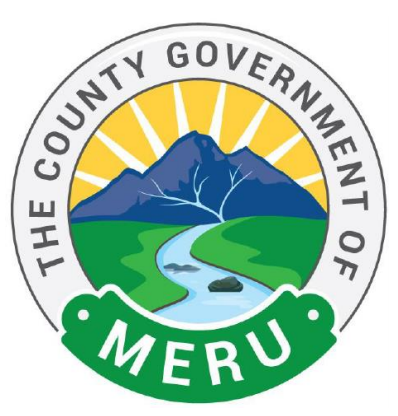
- Flag Coat of arms

- Location of Meru County in Kenya
- Coordinates: 0°3′N 37°38′E
- Country: Kenya
- Formed: 4 March 2013
- Capital and largest town: Meru

Government
  - Governor: Isaac Mutuma M'Ethingia

Area
  - Total: 7,006 km^{2} (2,705 sq mi)

Population (2019)
  - Total: 1,545,714
  - Density: 220.6/km^{2} (571.4/sq mi)
- Time zone: UTC+3 (EAT)
- GDP (PPP): ▲$9.484B (5th)
- Per Capita (PPP): ▲$5,905 (10th)
- GDP (nominal): ▲$3.482B (5th)
- Per Capita (nominal): ▲$2,168 (10th)
- Website: meru.go.ke

Meru County is one of the 47 counties of Kenya located in the Northern Mount Kenya region. It borders Isiolo County to the north, Tharaka-Nithi County to the south, Nyeri County to the southwest and Laikipia County to the west. Meru County has a population of 1.35 million people. It is home to the Meru people. The County headquarters and largest town is Meru.

The current governor of Meru County is Isaac Mutuma M'ethingia.

== Economy ==
Meru County is the 5th largest economy in Kenya with a GDP of $3.48B and $9.48B (PPP). Meru County is the leading county in agricultural production contributing 7.6% to Kenya's agricultural production.

Agriculture is the main economic activity due to rich volcanic soils in high altitude areas. Meru County is the leading County in Kenya by Horticultural production of Coffee, tea, French-beans and dairy products. Wholesale and retail trade also play an important role in the county's economy. It's the Leading County that produces Miraa (Khat) for export and hence boosting the economic national grid.

Meru town is the largest and main financial hub of Meru County.

== Physical and topographic features ==
Mount Kenya (now politically divided between Meru and other counties) has been influenced by the climate of the coast, especially the eastern slopes of the mountain with altitude ranges from 300m to 5,199m above sea level. Many rivers have their streams originating from Mount Kenya and Nyambene streams. Tana and Ewaso Nyiro Rivers are used for domestic and agricultural use.

When Kenya replaced its provinces with counties, Meru County was created out of the Eastern Province. It covers a total area of 7,006 km^{2} out of which 972.3 km^{2} is gazetted as forest.

== Climate ==
Annual rainfall ranges between 300 mm annually in the lower midlands to 2500 mm in the southeast. Long rains fall from mid-March to May and short rains are present from October to December.

== Demographics ==
As of the 2019 census, the county has a total population of 987,653 of which 489,691 are males, 497,942 females and 20 intersex persons. There are 244,669 households with an average household size of 4.0 persons per household.

=== Religion ===
Religion in Meru County

Religion (2019 Census)	Number
Catholicism	313,277
Protestant	615,129
Evangelical Churches	365,759
African instituted Churches	129,224
Orthodox	9,479
Other Christian	45,405
Islam	12,531
Hindu	336
Traditionists	18,898
Other	20,985
No Religion Atheists	12,551
Don't Know	2,348
Not Stated	242

== Administrative and political units ==
=== Administrative units ===
Meru County has nine sub counties, thirty five divisions, one hundred and sixty one locations and three hundred and eighty six sub-locations. It has nine constituencies and forty five county assembly wards.

==== Sub-counties ====
- Buuri East
- Buuri West
- Igembe North
- Igembe South
- Igembe Central
- Imenti North
- Imenti South
- Imenti Central
- Tigania East
- Tigania West

===== Constituencies =====
- Buuri
- Igembe North
- Igembe Central
- Igembe South
- North Imenti
- South Imenti
- Central Imenti
- Tigania East

Tigania central

- Tigania West

Kibirichia buuri

=== Political leadership ===
The first governor of Meru County was Peter Munya, elected in the 2013 election. In the 2017 election, Kiraitu Murungi defeated Munya to become the second governor. The third governor, Kawira Mwangaza, was elected in the 2022 election. However Kawira mwangaza was impeached in 2024 after surviving 2 impeachment motions in the Senate but the 3rd one wasn't successful when 26 senators upheld the impeachment of governor from the county assembly.

After her impeachment she decided to appeal the ruling at high court of Kenya where the court upheld the ruling of the Senate on March 14 2025 paving way for swearing in of her embattled deputy H.E. Rev. Isaac Mutuma M'Ethingia as the 4th and current governor of Meru county.

Murungi was elected in 2013 to be the senator from Meru County. When he ran for governor, Franklin Linturi was elected to the Senate.

Florence Kajuju was the county's first woman representative. She was defeated in 2017 by Kawira Mwangaza.

The Meru County Executive Committee comprises:

County Executive Committee
	Number
Governor	1
Deputy Governor	1
County Secretary	1
Other members	10
Total	13

== Education ==
There are 1,437 ECD centres, 1,030 primary schools and 372 secondary schools. The county has also 7 tertiary institutions, 6 special schools 7,483 adult education centres and 7 university campuses. Meru University of Science and Technology and Meru National Polytechnic are the largest education centers in Meru County.

== Health ==
There is a total of 460 health facilities, 995 hospital beds and 73 cots in the county, staffed by 1325 health personnel.

HIV prevalence rate was 2.9% in 2017, lower than the national rate of 5.9%.

== Transport ==
The county is covered by 1,260 km of road network. Of this, 767.5 km is covered by earth surface, 266.7 km is marram surface and 225.7 km of surface is covered by bitumen. During the rainy seasons, some sections of gravel and earth surface roads are impassable.

The county is served by one airstrip; Gaitu airstrip in Meru Central.

== Posts and telecommunications ==
There are six post offices and four sub-post offices with 7,600 installed letter boxes, 5,937 rented letter boxes, and 1,663 vacant letter boxes with numerous registered stamp vendors in the county. The six post offices are located in Meru, Maua, Nkubu, Timau, Muthara and Laare. They offer mail services, parcel delivery and other services. Most private and public organizations have embraced ICT in the day-to-day operations. Private entrepreneurs have continued to set up cyber cafes in major towns and trading centers due to high demand for internet services among others. Most of the areas in the county are covered by mobile phone network with the coverage being 95 per cent. Areas without mobile network coverage are mainly areas of Tigania bordering Isiolo County. Most of the community members rely on radio, television and newspapers as the major sources of information.

== History ==
In 1992, Meru District was split into Meru Central District, Meru North District, Meru South District, and Tharaka District In 1998, Tharaka District was again split into Nithi District and Tharaka District. A High Court decision in September 2009 ruled that the split had been unconstitutional, and the first two of these were re-amalgamated into Meru District, which became Meru County in 2010.

== Population ==
Historical population
Year	Pop.	±%
1999	1,102,930	—
2009	1,356,301	+23.0%
2019	1,545,714	+14.0%

Constituency Name	Number of wards	Wards
Imenti North	5	Municipality, Ntima East, Ntima West, Nyaki East, Nyaki West
Imenti South	6	Abogeta East, Abogeta West, Igoji West, Igoji East, Nkuene, Mitunguu
Imenti Central	4	Abothuguchi Central, Abothuguchi West, Kiagu, Mwanganthia
Buuri	5	Kiirua Naari, Timau, Kisima, Kibirichia, Ruiri Rwarera
Tigania West	5	Kianjai, Nkomo, Mbeu, Akiithi, Athwana
Tigania East	5	Muthara, Special, Karama, Kiguchwa, Mikinduri, Thangatha
Igembe Central	5	Kangeta, Njia, Igembe East, Akirang'ondu, Athiru Ruujine
Igembe South	5	Akachiu, Kanuni, Kegoi Antobuchiu, Maua, Athiru Gaiti
Igembe North	5	Amwathi, Naathu, Antubetwe Kiongo, Antuambui, Ntuene
Total	45	

== Villages and settlements ==
- Ardencaple Farm
- Magado
- Nkubu
- Inghi Farm
