= Jane Wanjuki Njiru =

Kenyan politician

Women Representative for Embu County
- In office 2017–2022

Personal details
- Party: Jubilee Party
- Education: Advanced Diploma in Management; Advanced Diploma in Sales and Marketing; Diploma in Public Relations
- Alma mater: Kenya Management and Training Institute
- Occupation: Politician

Jane Wanjūki Njirū is a Kenyan politician. She served as the Embu County women representative(2017-2022) and a member of the ruling political party, the jubilee party of Kenya. She vied and won the Embu woman representative post in the 2017 General election.

== Early life and education ==
She went to Mulango Girls High School for her Kenya Certificate of education in 1971 to 1974. She furthered her education at Kenya Management and Training Institute where she acquired a Advanced Diploma in management, Advance Diploma in Sale and Marketing and Diploma in Public Relations. She was once the vice-chairperson of the Communication, Information and Innovation committee in the parliament. She was also a member of Departmental Committee on Lands and Constitutional Implementation Oversight Committee in 12th parliament.

== Career ==
Njirū was elected as the Embu county women representative in 2017. She worked as a Chief Executive Officer at New day Motors Limited in 2006 to 2017 and in 1979 to 2006 she was Sales and Marketing Associate at Telecom Kenya.
