= Florence Bore =

Kenyan politician

Florence Chepngetich Koskey Bore

Cabinet Secretary for Labour and Social Protection
- In office September 2022 – 11 July 2024
- President: William Ruto
- Preceded by: Simon Chelugui

County Woman Representative for Kericho County
- In office 2017–2022

Personal details
- Born: 1 January 1972 (age 54) Kericho County, Kenya
- Occupation: Politician

Florence Chepngetich Koskey Bore is a Kenyan politician from the United Democratic Alliance (Kenya) who is a former Minister of Labour and Social Protection since 2022. She was sacked from her Cabinet position on July 11, 2024, when President Ruto sacked every one of the country's cabinet ministers. She previously worked as Cabinet Secretary. She was elected County woman representative for Kericho County in the 2017 Kenyan general election.

== Biography ==
Florence Bore was born January 1 1972, completing her primary education in her home region of Kericho in 1983. Bore finished her secondary studies at the Kipsigis Girls School in 1992. Thereafter, she enrolled at the Kagumo Teachers Training College where she obtained a degree in education. In 1992 and 2013, she pursued a baccalaureate in educational sciences.

== Professional and political career ==
From teaching, Bore went on to become director of the Geothermal Development Company before running for Kericho MP in the 2017 Kenyan general election.

In September 2022, she became secretary to the Minister for Labour and Social Protection before exiting on July 11 2024, when virtually all of the Kenyan government was sacked by President William Ruto.
