= Beatrice Pauline Cherono Kones =

Kenyan politician

Hon. Beatrice Pauline Cherono Kones

Member of Parliament for Bomet East Constituency
- In office 2017–2022

Member of Parliament for Bomet East Constituency
- In office 2008–2013
- Preceded by: Kipkalya Kones

Personal details
- Born: September 9, 1957 (age 69) Bomet County, Kenya
- Education: Kericho Teachers Training College
- Occupation: Politician, teacher
- Profession: Educator

Beatrice Pauline Cherono Kones (born 9 September 1957) was a Kenyan politician and a Member of the National Assembly representing Bomet East constituency.

== Early life and education ==
Kones was born on 9 September 1957 in Bomet County. She attended Cheptuiyet Primary School and was awarded a Certificate of Primary Education (CPE). She later joined Sosiot Girls High School for the secondary level and earned a Certificate of Secondary Education (CSE).She then joined Kericho Teachers Training College for the teacher training course and graduated in 1983.

== Career ==
Beatrice Pauline Cherono Kones started her career as a teacher in 1983 through the Kenya Teachers Service Commission.

In 2008, she contested and won the by-election for Member of Parliament representing Bomet East Constituency. The by-election was a result of a plane crash that claimed the life of Kipkalya Kones who was the Member of Parliament for Bomet Constituency and also a minister.

In 2017, she was re-elected as a Member of the National Assembly for Bomet East. In 2022 she was replaced by Richard Yegon. She also served in the Maendeleo ya Wanawake organization in different capacities.

== Personal life ==
Beatrice Pauline Cherono Kones was married to the Late Kipkalya Kones. Together they had three children.

== See also ==
- Kipkalya Kones
- Bomet East constituency
- Kenya National Assembly
- Maendeleo ya Wanawake
