= Onesmas Ngunjiri =

Kenyan politician

Onesmas Kìmani Ngūnjiri is a Kenyan politician who was a member of the National Assembly for Bahati Constituency under the Jubilee Party.

Kìmani Ngūnjiri is, as of June 2021, in the Jubilee Tanga Tanga formation and is an ardent supporter of Rigathi Gachagua, the Former Deputy President of the Republic of Kenya. He is a politician from Nakuru, Kenya, widely known for his anti-Finance Bill 2024 stance.

== Early life and education ==
Ngūnjiri was born at Banita Sisal Estate in 1953. He had his primary in 1965 and Secondary education in 1971 at Michinda primary and Michinda secondary school for his EACE.

== Political career ==
He is a member of the Departmental Committee on Lands and the Committee on Implementation.There is no information on how many terms he has been in office

== Election results ==
General election 2017: Bahati
Party	Candidate	Votes	%
Jubilee	Onesmas Kimani Ngunjiri	60,650	82.5
Independent	John Mbugua Honest	8,604	11.7
Independent	Dedan Mwenda Gikwa Gichuhi	3,039	4.1
Independent	John Thuo Mwaura	561	0.8
Independent	Joseph Kamau Kimani	360	0.5
Independent	Eliud Mungai Kamau	282	0.4
Majority		52,046	70.8
