= Buuri Constituency =

Electoral district of Kenya

Coordinates: 0.1263°N 37.563°E

Buuri
- constituency for the Parliament of Kenya
- Buuri Constituency within Meru County

- Meru County within Kenya
- County: Meru
- Population: 109,803 (2022)
- Area: 961.80 km^{2} (371.35 sq mi)

Current constituency
- Number of members: 1
- Party: UDA
- Member of Parliament: Mugambi Ridikiri Murwithania
- Wards: 5

Buuri Constituency is an electoral constituency in Kenya. It is one of nine constituencies in Meru County. The constituency was split from North Imenti Constituency.

Buuri Constituency contains five county assembly wards: Timau, Kisima, Kiirua/Naari, Ruiri/Rwarera and Kibirichia.

Elijah Thuranira was the assembly member from Kibirichia, Martin Kimathi Muriungi is from Timau, Joy Karambu is from Kisima, Peter Kalembe was from Ruiri. Jennifer Makena Murogocho is the MCA Kiirua-Naari ward from 2022.

== Description ==
Buuri Constituency is located in Meru County in the Mount Kenya region, covering approximately 961.80 km^{2} (371.35 sq mi). The constituency was created in 2012 from parts of North Imenti Constituency.

As of 2012, it has an approximate population of 109,803.

== Members of Parliament ==
| Elections | MP | Party |
Buuri Constituency created from North Imenti Constituency
| 2013 | Boniface Kinoti Gatobu | Independent |
| 2017 | Rindikiri Mugambi Murwithania | JP |
| 2022 | Rindikiri Mugambi Murwithania | UDA |

== Locations and wards ==
There are 5 wards in Buuri Constituency: Timau, Kisima, Kiirua/Naari, Kibirichia, and Ruiri/Rwarera. As of 2022, there are 82,341 registered voters.

| Ward | Population |
|---|---|
| Timau | 22,215 |
| Kisima | 18,075 |
| Kirua/Naari | 15,690 |
| Ruiri/Rwarera | 14,840 |
| Kibirichia | 11,521 |
| Total | 82,341 |
*As of 2022
