= Kubai Iringo =

Kenyan politician and diplomat

Kubai Cyprian Iringo is a Kenyan politician and diplomat currently serving as Kenyan ambassador to Somalia. He was a member of the 11th parliament of Kennya elected from Igembe Central Constituency on the Orange Democratic Movement (ODM) and with the support of CORD Coalition. He served on the house committee on Finance, Planning and Trade and spoke 462 times on the floor of the house during the 11th parliament. In December 2013, his party, ODM threatened to expel him and a fellow MP Mpuru Aburi from the party for expressing willingness to work with Jubilee Coalition government. He was appointed Kenyan ambassador to Somalia in October 2023. Iringo is a recipient of Shujaa Parliamentarian Award for “Championing Wananchi in matters of health” (2015) given by Mzalendo Trust.

He graduated from Kenya Methodist University in 2016.
