= Balambala Constituency =

Constituency in Garissa County, Kenya

Balambala
- constituency for the Parliament of Kenya
- Balambala Constituency within Garissa County

- Garissa County within Kenya
- County: Garissa
- Population: 32,257
- Area: 3,684 km^{2} (1,422.4 sq mi)

Current constituency
- Number of members: 1
- Party: JP
- Member of Parliament: Abdi Omar Shurie
- Wards: 5

Balambala is a constituency in Kenya. It is one of six constituencies in Garissa County. Its representative in the National Assembly is Hon Abdi Omar Shurie of Jubilee Party.
