= Beatrice Adagala =

Kenyan politician

Beatrice Kahai Adagala

County Woman Representative for Vihiga County
- Incumbent
- Assumed office 2017
- Preceded by: Position established
- Constituency: Vihiga County

Personal details
- Occupation: Politician

Beatrice Kahai Adagala is a Kenyan politician who currently serves in the Kenya National Assembly as a county woman representative for Vihiga.

She was elected to parliament as the county woman representative for Vihiga in 2017, representing the Amani National Congress.

She was one of 10 members of parliament who called for an investigation into the wealth of Deputy President William Ruto in 2020. She was re-elected in the 2022 Kenyan general election.

== See also ==
- 12th Parliament of Kenya
- 13th Parliament of Kenya
