= Igembe Central Constituency =

Electoral constituency of Kenya

Igembe Central
- constituency for the Parliament of Kenya
- Igembe Central Constituency within Meru County

- Meru County within Kenya
- County: Meru
- Population: 221,412
- Area: 603 km^{2} (232.8 sq mi)

Current constituency
- Number of members: 1
- Party: JP
- Member of Parliament: Dan Kiili Karitho
- Wards: 5

Igembe Central is a constituency in Kenya. It is one of nine constituencies in Meru County.

Igembe Central constituency is situated in Eastern Region . It borders Tigania east constituency to the west, Meru national park to the east, Igembe south constituency to the south and Igembe North constituency to the North. The constituency is divided into five wards; Akirang’ondu, Njia, Kangeta, Kiengu and Athiru ruujine wards. The NGCDF office is located at Kangeta in kangeta ward
