= Jane Kagiri =

Kenyan politician

Jane Wangechi Kagiri

Women's Representative for Laikipia County
- Incumbent
- Assumed office 8th September 2022

Personal details
- Born: Kenya
- Party: United Democratic Alliance
- Education: Othaya Girls High School; Babson College; United States International University; University of Madras
- Occupation: Politician

Jane Wangechi Kagiri is a Kenyan politician from the United Democratic Alliance. In the 2022 Kenyan general election, she was elected women's representative for Laikipia County.

== Education ==
Kagiri attended the following educational institutions:

- Othaya Girls High School
- Babson College
- United States International University
- University of Madras

== See also ==
- 13th Parliament of Kenya
