= Elsie Busihile Muhanda =

Woman Representative of the Kenya National Assembly
- Incumbent
- Assumed office 2017

Personal details
- Born: 10th of October, 1961 Kakamenga County
- Education: Kenyatta University, University of Nairobi
- Occupation: Politician; Educator

Elsie Busihile Muhanda (born 10 October 1961) is a Kenyan politician who has served as the Woman Representative for Kakamenga County in the National Assembly Since 2017. She is a member of the Orange Democratic Movement.

== Early life and education ==
Muhanda was born in Kakamenga County and she obtained her elementary education from the county. She earned her Bachelor degree in education with a focus in Economics from the Kenyatta University between 1980-1984. She obtained her postgraduate diploma in population studies from the University of Nairobi in Kenya.

== Political career ==
Muhanda was elected as Woman representative for Kakamenga County in the 2017 general election representing the ODM party. She was re-elected in the 2022 general election and continues to serve in the 13th parliament till 2027.
