= Khwisero Constituency =

Electoral constituency of Kenya

Khwisero
- constituency for the Parliament of Kenya
- Khwisero Constituency within Kakamega County

- Kakamega County within Kenya
- County: Kakamega
- Population: 113,476
- Area: 146 km^{2} (56.4 sq mi)

Current constituency
- Number of members: 1
- Party: ODM
- Member of Parliament: Christopher Aseka Wangaya
- Wards: 4

Khwisero Constituency is an electoral constituency in Western Kenya. It is one of the twelve constituencies in Kakamega County with a population of 113,294 people (2019 census). The constituency has four wards, all electing MCAs to the Kakamega county assembly. It was established for the 1997 elections.

== Members of Parliament ==
Elections	MP	Party	Notes
1997	Harrison Aywa Odongo	KANU	One Party System
2002	Julius Odenyo Arungah	NARC	
2007	Evans Bulimo Akula	ODM	
2013	Benjamin Andola	ODM	First General Elections under the 2010 Constitution
2017	Christopher Aseka Wangaya	ANC	2017 General Elections held by IEBC on 8 August 2017
2022	Christopher Aseka Wangaya	ODM	2022 General Elections held by IEBC on 9 August 2022

== Wards ==
Voters in 2022
Ward	Registered Voters
Kisa Central	23,081
Kisa North	10,810
Kisa East	10,385
West Kisa	10,815
Total	55,091
