= Dennitah Ghati =

Kenyan politician

Dennitah Ghati MP

Nominated Member of Parliament
- Incumbent
- Assumed office 8 August 2017

Woman Representative for Migori
- In office 4 March 2013 – 8 August 2017
- Majority: 132,852 (51.4%)

Personal details
- Born: 1980 (age 45–46)
- Party: Orange Democratic Movement

Dennitah Ghati is a Kenyan politician who is a nominated member of the Kenya National Assembly, representing people with disabilities. She is a member of the Orange Democratic Movement.

== Early life ==
Dennitah Ghati was born in 1980 in a rural village in Migori and attended Kenya Institute of Mass Communication in Nairobi and Kenyatta University before working as a journalist at The East African Standard Newspaper.

Ghati obtained a scholarship to Columbia University in the USA where she obtained a Master's degree and worked in New York for the American Jewish World Service. She subsequently worked for the League of Kenyan Women Voters and as a program manager for UNICEF Somalia.

== Political career ==
Ghati was elected to the National Assembly at the 2013 general election as the woman representative for Migori county with a majority of 51%, representing the Orange Democratic Movement. Following the election the Peoples' Democratic Party candidate Fatuma Zainabu Mohammed challenged the election result in court, alleging intimidation, vote buying and bribery. The case was dismissed confirming Ghati's election.

In 2014 she was involved in a road traffic accident in which she suffered a broken spine, leaving her permanently disabled. She now uses a wheelchair.

In 2017 Ghati was nominated by the ODM to serve in one of the appointed seats in the national assembly as one of 12 members nominated by the political parties. These 12 un-elected seats were introduced by the Constitution of Kenya in 2010 to represent the special interests of youth, persons with disabilities and workers. Ghati is a representative of people with disabilities.

=== Election results ===
General election 2013: Migori
Party	Candidate	Votes	%
ODM	Dennitah Ghati	193,324	74.7
Peoples Democratic Party	Fatuma Zainab Mohammed	60,472	23.4
National Alliance	Elsheba Akinyi Ayoma	4,857	1.9
Majority		132,852	51.4
Turnout			
