= Kisii University =

University in Kenya

Coordinates: 0.691231°S 34.783058°E

- Former name: Kisii University College
- Motto: Fons Scientiae
- Established: 2013
- Vice-Chancellor: Prof. Nathan Oyori Ogechi
- Students: 10,000+
- Location: Kisii, Kenya
- Campus: 61 acres (25 ha)
- Website: www.kisiiuniversity.ac.ke

Kisii University is a public university located in Kisii. It was founded in 1965 as a primary teachers’ training college on a 61-acre land that was donated by the County Council of Gusii. The college continued up to 1983 where it was upgraded to a secondary teachers’ college to offer Diploma programmes.

== History ==
The Government of Kenya mandated the university to take over the college as its campus in 1994. Kisii Campus was one of the earliest campuses to be created in Kenya by the then Head of State, H.E. Daniel arap Moi. In 1999, the Faculty of Commerce established a Bachelor of Business and Management as its first degree programmes within the campus to run alongside a postgraduate Diploma in Education, which was phased out in 2001.

On 23 August 2007, Kisii University College was established through a Government Legal Notice No.163 of 2007 as a constituent college of Egerton University. On 6 February 2013, it was awarded a charter to become the 13th public university in Kenya.

The university main campus is situated 2 km from Kisii Town Centre, off the Kisii – Kilgoris Road.

== Campuses and schools ==
The students are distributed over the Main Campus, Kisii Town Campuses, Keroka Campus, Nyamira Campus, kisumu, Ogembo Campus and migori Campus.

The university has the following faculties, schools and institutes:

- School of Law

Founded in 2009, Kisii University School of Law has gained national recognition for registering impressive results in the Kenya School of Law examinations. For instance, of the International and local Universities represented in the November 2018 bar examinations, Kisii University emerged top after 20 of its 60 students passed for admission.

- School of Pure and Applied Sciences
- School of Health Sciences
- School of Business and Economics
- School of Education and Human Resource Development
- School of Arts and Social Science
- School of Information Science and Technology
- School of Agriculture and Natural Resource Management

As part of its expansion programme, the university has opened campuses in Nairobi, Eldoret, Kisumu, Kitale and Kabarnet.

Directorate of E-Learning

Due to the COVID-19 virus that was ravaging the whole world, e-learning is becoming a model of teaching for the university with a full directorate that is spearheading offering of learning through that platform.

Departments

The university has several other departments that support the academic wing of the university. One of the notable ones is the Anti-Ada Unit that coordinates the prevention, early detection and mitigation of substance abuse through education, advocacy, empowerment and partnership for a productive university community - students and staff.

Other Supportive Programmes

- Online Orientation

Special moments call for special interventions. The university through the vice chancellor's officer is now offering online orientation for students who want to enrol into new semesters. This is saving both students and staff time and money that they could have used to come physically on campus to participate in the exercise.

- Selfcare

Staff and students have been enabled to request for university services at the comfort of their homes through the selfcare platform of the university.

Up-Coming Centre

The main mission of a university is research and teaching. While the later is obvious, the former is yet to be well cultivated. In responding to the global mandate of universities, Kisii University is setting up a Centre for Natural Products and Drugs at Nyangweta farm in South Mugirango Constituency of Kisii County. This centre will have a botanical garden of flora and fauna of medicinal value found in the western region of Kenya from which natural products of medicinal value will be extracted, isolated and elucidated for the healing of diseases.
