= Vihiga Constituency =

Electoral constituency of Kenya

Vihiga
- constituency for the Parliament of Kenya
- Vihiga Constituency within Vihiga County

- Vihiga County within Kenya
- County: Vihiga
- Population: 95,292
- Area: 90 km^{2} (34.7 sq mi)

Current constituency
- Number of members: 1
- Party: JP
- Member of Parliament: Ernest Ogesi
- Wards: 4

Vihiga constituency is an electoral district for the National Assembly of Kenya, encompassing Vihiga, Kenya. It is one of five constituencies in Vihiga County.

The current member of parliament (MP) for the district is Ernest Ogesi Kivai, who won on an Amani National Congress party ticket with 48.44% of the vote. His nearest challenger, Dorcas Kedogo of the Orange Democratic Party slate, received 20.14% of the vote.
