= Fatuma Zainab Mohammed =

Kenyan politician

Parliament of Kenya
- Constituency: Migori

Personal details
- Citizenship: Kenya
- Occupation: Politician

Fatuma Zainab Mohammed is a Kenyan politician who is an Independent member of Parliament and National Assembly.

== Career ==
Mohammed was a Business Manager at Fiera Milano then she advanced to the role of Business Administrator at Tibb S.R.L. before becoming a Director at Kenya Regular Services (KRS) until 2022 when she entered in politics.

== Political career ==
In 2022 Kenyan general election she entered the election as an Independent candidate and made history by winning a Woman Representative seat for Migori County. Her victory was very notable after being the first independent candidate to win Woman Representative seat in Nyanza region.

After entering the Parliament she quickly gained the recognition as she was elected to be the Chairperson of Special Funds Account Committee and she is also a member of Liaison committee.
