= Bomet East Constituency =

Bomet East
- constituency for the Parliament of Kenya
- Bomet East Constituency within Bomet County

- Bomet County within Kenya
- County: Bomet
- Population: 144,275
- Area: 305 km^{2} (117.8 sq mi)

Current constituency
- Number of members: 1
- Party: UDA
- Member of Parliament: Richard Yegon Kipkemoi
- Wards: 5

Bomet East is a constituency in Kenya. It is one of five constituencies in Bomet County.

== Administrative and political units ==
Bomet East is headed by member of parliament Richard Kipkemoi Yegon and has five county assembly wards namely Merigi, Kembu, Kipkeres, Chemaner and Longisa.

== Electoral history ==
Members of parliament
Election	MP	Party	Notes
Bomet East Constituency created from Bomet
2013	Bett Bernard Kipkirui	URP	
2017	Bett Bernard Kipkirui	Independent	
2022	Richard Kipkemoi Yegon	UDA	

== See also ==
- Sotik Constituency
- Chepalungu Constituency
- Konoin Constituency
- Bomet Central Constituency
