= Rachael Kaki Nyamai =

Kenyan politician (born 1976)

Member of Parliament for Kitui South
- Incumbent
- Assumed office 2013

Personal details
- Born: 1976 (age 49–50) Kitui County, Kenya
- Party: Jubilee Party
- Spouse: Titus Mavui Ngumu
- Children: Yes
- Education: Kyatune Primary School; Muthale Girls High School; Kenyatta University (BEd, MEd); University of Aarhus (PhD)
- Occupation: Politician, lecturer

Rachael Kaki Nyamai is a Kenyan politician. She is a member of parliament for Kitui south constituency in Kitui County under Jubilee Party.

== Early years and education ==
Nyamai was born in 1976 in Kitui county. She had her primary and secondary education at Kyatune primary school and Muthale Girls High school for her secondary education respectively. She furthered her education at Kenyatta University where she acquired a bachelor's degree in Education and master's degree in sociology. Between 2006 and 2009, she attended the University of Aarhus in Danish School of Education in Denmark to study a Doctor of Philosophy (PhD).

== Career ==
She was a lecturer at Kenyatta University and South Eastern University college of Kitui. She was elected to the 11th parliament in 2013 on a NARC party ticket and in 2017 She won re-election on Jubilee party. She became the Member of Parliament for Kitui South constituency in 2013, and a member of the National Assembly Liaison Committee and the House Business Committee.

== Personal life ==
She is married to Titus Mavui Ngumu with children. She released a gospel song in collaboration with Justus Myello. She is also a staunch Christian and a church elder.
