= Annie Wanjiku Kibeh =

Kenyan politician

Member of the National Assembly of Kenya
- In office 2017–2022
- Constituency: Gatundu North Constituency

Personal details
- Party: Jubilee Party
- Occupation: Politician, Media practitioner

Annie Wanjiku Kibeh is a Kenyan politician and former media practitioner who served as the Member of the National Assembly for Gatundu North Constituency from 2017 to 2022. She was elected during the 2017 Kenyan general elections on a Jubilee Party ticket.

== Early life and education ==
Kibeh was educated in Kenya, having attended St. Francis Girls Mang’u and Mukurerwe Primary School. She later pursued higher education at Kenyatta University and the University of Nairobi, where she obtained degrees in Education and Business Administration.

== Early career ==
Before entering elective politics, Kibeh worked in the media and education sectors. She served in various roles including radio presenter, head of radio, and media director at organisations such as Mediamax Ltd and Waks Media Ltd. She also worked as a headteacher at Kenvale Academy between 2000 and 2002.

== Political career ==
Kibeh began her political career as a Member of the Kiambu County Assembly, serving from 2013 to 2017. In 2017, she was elected as Member of Parliament for Gatundu North Constituency under the Jubilee Party ticket.She became part of the 12th Parliament of Kenya, representing her constituency at the national level.

== Election dispute and court case ==
Kibeh’s 2017 election was challenged in court by former MP Clement Kung’u Waibara, who alleged that she had not properly resigned from her position as a Member of County Assembly before contesting for Parliament. The High Court initially nullified her election and declared the Gatundu North parliamentary seat vacant. However, the Court of Appeal later overturned the decision, reinstating her position and clarifying the legal interpretation of eligibility and resignation requirements for elective officeholders.

== Political affiliation ==
She is a member of the Jubilee Party, one of Kenya’s major political parties during the 2017–2022 parliamentary term.
