= Kapseret Constituency =

Electoral constituency in Kenya

Kapseret
- constituency for the Parliament of Kenya
- Kapseret Constituency within Uasin Gishu County

- Uasin Gishu County within Kenya
- County: Uasin Gishu
- Population: 198,499
- Area: 299 km^{2} (115.4 sq mi)

Current constituency
- Number of members: 1
- Party: UDA
- Member of Parliament: Oscar Kipchumba Sudi
- Wards: 5

Kapseret is a constituency in Kenya, one of six constituencies in Uasin Gishu County.
