= Bomet County =

- County
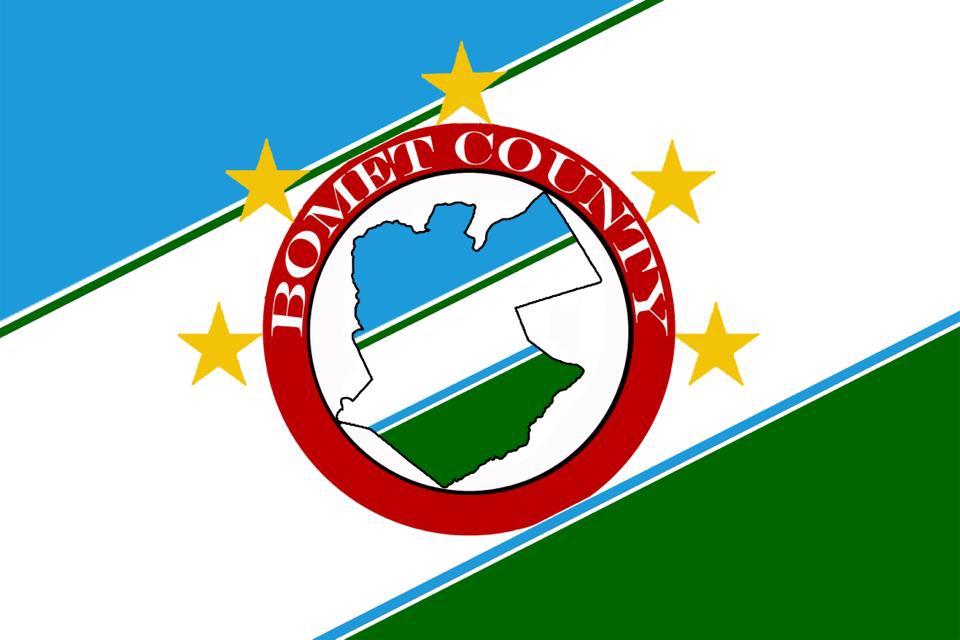
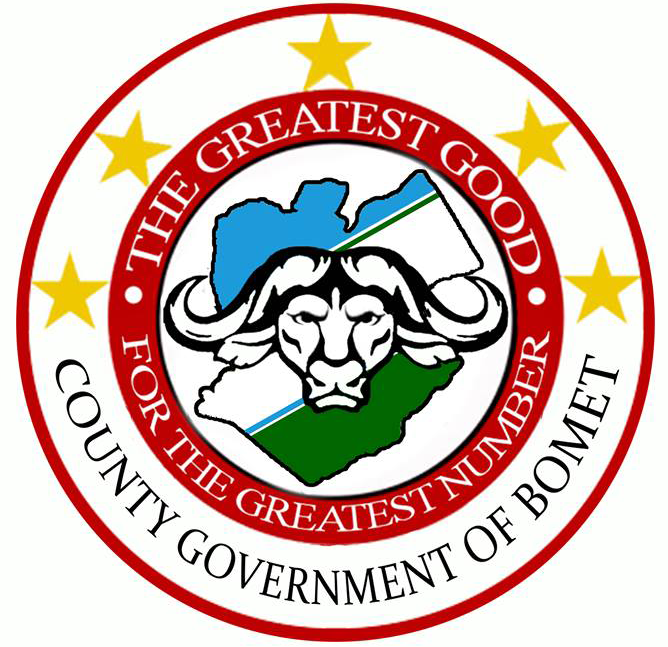
- Flag Coat of arms

- Location of Bomet County in Kenya
- Coordinates: 0.8°S 35.2333°E
- Country: Kenya
- Formed: 4 March 2013
- Capital: Bomet

Area
  - Total: 1,630.0 km^{2} (629.3 sq mi)
- Elevation: 1,962 m (6,437 ft)

Population (2019)
  - Total: 875,689
  - Density: 537.23/km^{2} (1,391.4/sq mi)
- Time zone: UTC+3 (EAT)
- Website: www.bomet.go.ke

Bomet County is located in the Rift Valley region of Kenya, was established in 2010 and had a population of approximately 875,689[¹], (2009 census) making it the 32nd largest county in Kenya by population. It is bordered by Kericho County to the west, Nakuru County to the northwest, and Narok County to the southeast. The county is characterized by its rolling hills, fertile agricultural land, and significant natural resources, including the Mau Forest and rivers such as Nyangores and Chepalungu. The predominant ethnic group is the Kalenjin.

== Local authorities ==
Local authorities (councils)
Authority	Type	Population*	Urban pop.*
Bomet	Municipality	42,024	4,426
Bomet County	County	340,770	244
Total	–	382,794	4,670
* 1999 census. Source:

== Administrative and political units ==
Bomet county has five sub-county administrative units with 25 county assembly wards and 66 locations.

Administrative Units and area by Sub-County/Constituency
Sub-County (Constituency)	Wards	Area in km sq.	No. of locations	No. of Sub-locations
Bomet Central	Silibwet, Singorwet, Ndarawetta, Chesoen & Mutarakwa	266	8	23
Bomet East	Longisa, Kembu, Chemaner, Merigi & Kipreres	311.3	10	27
Chepalungu	Sigor, Kongasis, Chebunyo, Nyongores & Siongiroi	535.8	15	42
Sotik	Ndanai/Abosi, Kipsonoi, Kapletundo, Chemagel & Manaret/Rongena	479.2	17	36
Konoin	Kimulot, Mogogosiek, Boito, Embomos & Chepchabas	445.1	16	37
	Total	2037	66	176

== Leadership ==
Governors Of Bomet County
Term of office	Governor's Name	Political Party
2013–2017	Isaac Ruto	URP
2017–2019	Joyce Laboso	Jubilee
2019–2022	Dr. Hillary Barchok	N/A
2022	Dr. Hillary Barchok	UDA

== County government ==
Bomet has had three governors since devolution, Isaac Ruto was the first Governor and was replaced by Joyce Laboso who died of cancer while in office. Dr. Hillary Barchok, being the deputy, was sworn in as the third governor on 8 August 2019. Linet Chepkorir Toto is the current women representative and Lawyer Hillary Sigei is currently serving as a Senator. The county ward assemblies are run by members of county assemblies.

== Electoral constituencies ==
The county has five electoral constituencies:

- Bomet Central Constituency
- Bomet East Constituency
- Chepalungu Constituency
- Sotik Constituency
- Konoin Constituency

== Demographics ==
Bomet has a population of 875,689 person with a population density of 346 persons per square km as per the 2019 census report, out of this 434,287 are females, 441,379 males and 23 intersex persons.

=== Religion ===
Religion in Bomet County

Majority of the residents of Bomet County are Christians. Islam and Hinduism is adhered to by less than 1% of the population of whom majority of the same are non residents of Bomet County.

Religion (2019 Census)	Number
Catholic	129,547
Protestant	387,001
Evangelical Churches	225,608
African Instituted Churches	56,401
Orthodox	2,858
Other Christian	32,527
Islam	997
Hindu	96
Traditionalists	2,514
Other	11,045
No ReligionAtheists	23,413
Don't Know	957
Not Stated	59

== Economy ==
The county is part of the Lake Region Economic Bloc (LREB) established in 2018 to foster regional economic, industrial, social, and technological collaboration.

== Services/Urbanisation ==
Stats for Bomet County
County	Stats for the County (Per cent)
Urbanisation	13.8
Literacy	63.8
Attending School (15-18 Yrs)	88.6
Paved Roads	5.4
Good Roads	39.6
Electricity Access	4.3
Poverty Rate	46.5
Stats for the County

Source: USAid Kenya

== Secondary schools ==
- Tenwek Boys High
- Longisa Boys High School
- Moi Siongiroi Girls High School
- Kabungut Boys High
- Ndaraweta Girls secondary School
- Kipsingei Mixed Day Secondary School
- Kaboson Girls School
- Chepalungu Boys High School
- Chebunyo Boys Secondary School
- Chebunyo Girls Secondary School
- Siwot Secondary School
- Kiptobit Secondary School
- Kaplong Boys high school
- kimuchul Secondary school
- Kaplong Girls Secondary school
- Moi Minariet Boys Secondary School
- Muiywek Secondary School
- Gorgor Secondary School
- Chebilat Boys High School
- Kamung'ei Secondary School
- Kamureito Secondary School
- Ndanai Girls High School
- Solyot Secondary School
- Olbutyo Boys High School
- Olbobo Secondary School
- Mulot High School
- Kakimirai High school
- Lelkatet High School
- Saseta Girls Secondary School
- Simoti Secondary School
- Merigi Secondary School
- Kaporuso Secondary School
- Sigowet Secondary School
- Chemaner Secondary School
- Sigor Boys High School
- Kaboson Secondary School
- Sugumerga Secondary School
- Kipreres Secondary School
- Toronik Secondary School
- Plokyi Girls Secondary School
- Itembe secondary school

== Universities ==
The Bomet University College, a constituent of Moi University, is located in Bomet town.

== See also ==
- Nakuru County
- Narok County
- Kericho County
- Nyamira County
- Tenwek Mission Hospital
