= Lunga Lunga Constituency =

Electoral constituency of Kenya

Lungalunga
- constituency for the Parliament of Kenya
- Lungalunga Constituency within Kwale County

- Kwale County within Kenya
- County: Kwale
- Population: 198,423
- Area: 197 km^{2} (76.1 sq mi)

Current constituency
- Number of members: 1
- Party: UDM
- Member of Parliament: Mangale Munga Chiforomodo
- Wards: 4

Lunga Lunga is a constituency in Kenya. It is one of four constituencies in Kwale County.
