= Kisumu Central Constituency =

Electoral constituency of Kenya

Kisumu Central
- constituency for the Parliament of Kenya
- Kisumu Central Constituency within Kisumu County

- Kisumu County within Kenya
- County: Kisumu
- Population: 174,145
- Area: 37 km^{2} (14.3 sq mi)

Current constituency
- Number of members: 1
- Party: ODM
- Member of Parliament: Joshua Odongo Oron
- Wards: 6

Kisumu Central is a constituency in Kenya. It is one of seven constituencies in Kisumu County.
