= John Mbadi =

Kenyan politician

Mbadi John Nganga

Cabinet Secretary for the National Treasury and Economic Planning
- Incumbent
- Assumed office August 8, 2024
- President: William Ruto

Member of Parliament for Suba Constituency
- In office March 4, 2013 – August 2022
- Succeeded by: Caroli Omondi

Personal details
- Born: Mbadi John Ng'ongo Kenya
- Education: University of Nairobi (BCom, MBA)
- Occupation: Politician, Accountant
- Profession: Certified Public Accountant

Mbadi John Ng'ongo is a Kenyan politician who has been serving as the Cabinet Secretary for the National Treasury and Economic Planning since August 8, 2024.

== Education ==
Mbadi attended Lingongo Primary School and later joined Kokuro Boys Secondary School for his secondary education. He attended the University of Nairobi in 1992 and graduated in 1996 with a Bachelor of Commerce. In 2007, he obtained a Master of Business Administration. He is also a Certified Public Accountant and member of the Institute of Certified Public Accountants of Kenya.

== Career ==
He was employed by the University of Nairobi as a senior accountant, where he worked until 2011. He was very vocal and instrumental in parliament. In September 2012, Mbadi was appointed the Assistant Minister in the Office of the Prime Minister, a position he held until the 2013 general elections. Mbadi was a Suba Constituency Member of Parliament after he was elected in the March 4, 2013, elections.

On July 24, 2024, President William Ruto nominated Mbadi as Kenya's Cabinet Secretary for the National Treasury and Economic Planning. He assumed office on August 8, 2024.
