= Chama Cha Mashinani =

Kenyan political party

- Leader: Isaac Ruto
- Founded: 7 September 2016

Chama Cha Mashinani is a political party in Kenya. It is currently headed by veteran politician Isaac Ruto. The Chama Cha Mashinani had four elected members of the Kenyan National Assembly in the 12th Parliament of Kenya.
