= 12th Parliament of Kenya =

←	11th	13th	→
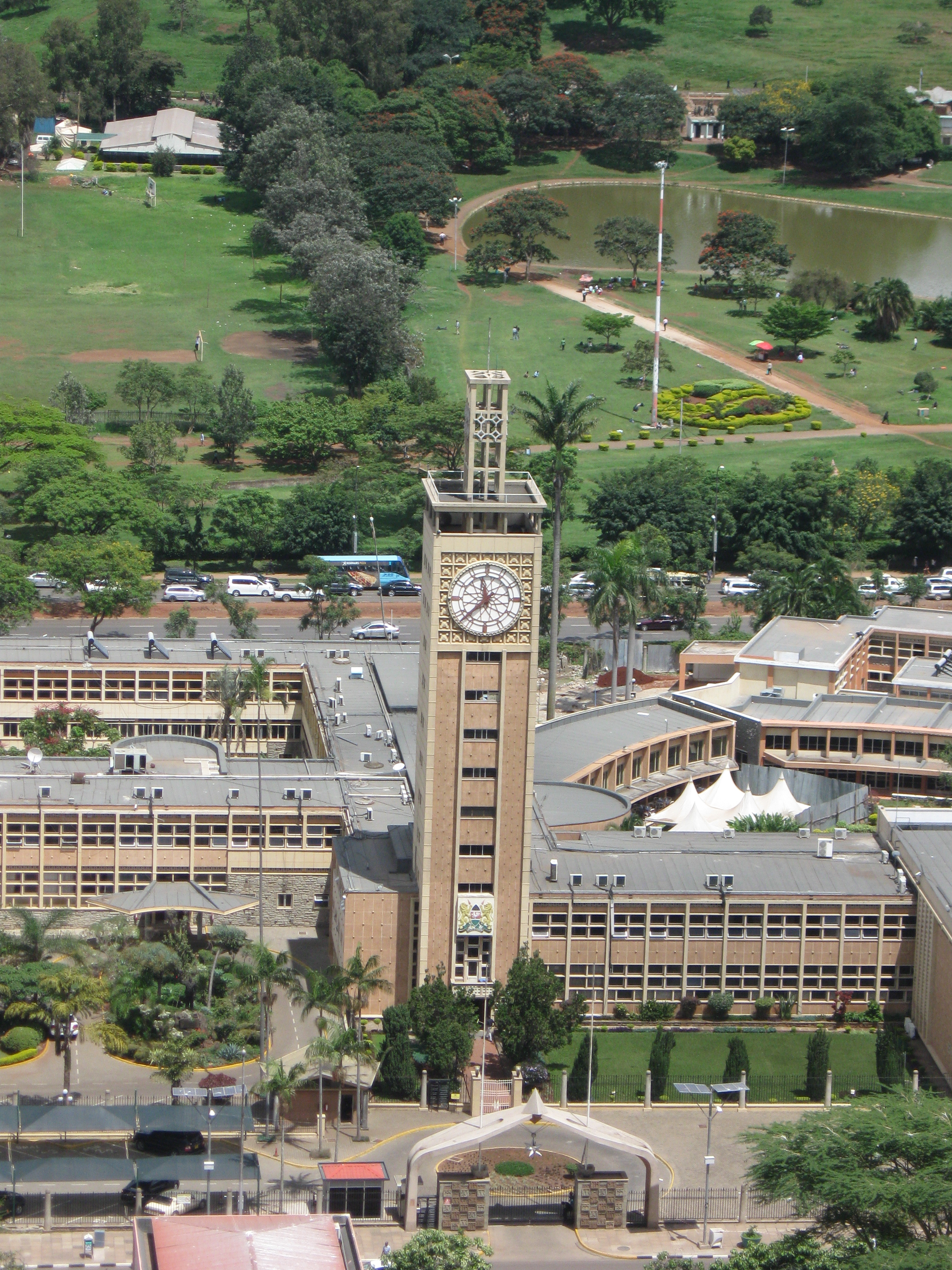
- Parliamentary Buildings, Nairobi

Overview
- Legislative body: Parliament of Kenya
- Meeting place: Nairobi
- Term: 31 August 2017 – 8 September 2022
- Election: 8 August 2017
- Government: Jubilee Party
- Opposition: National Super Alliance
- Website: www.parliament.go.ke

National Assembly
- Members: 349
- Speaker: Justin Muturi
- Deputy Speaker: Moses Cheboi
- Majority Leader: Aden Duale (2017–2020); Amos Kimunya (2020–2022)
- Minority Leader: John Mbadi
- Party control: Jubilee Party

Senate
- Members: 67
- Speaker: Kenneth Lusaka
- Deputy Speaker: Kithure Kindiki (2017–2020); Margaret Kamar (2020–2022)
- Majority Leader: Kipchumba Murkomen (2017–2020); Samuel Poghisio (2020–2022)
- Minority Leader: Moses Wetang'ula
- Party control: Jubilee Party

Sessions
- 1st: 31 August 2017 – 7 December 2017

The 12th Parliament of Kenya was the meeting of the legislative branch of the national government of Kenya constituted following the general election of 8 August 2017 and held its inaugural sitting on 31 August 2017. Serving during the second term of President Uhuru Kenyatta, it comprised 416 members, 349 in the National Assembly and 67 in the Senate. It was a bicameral legislature dominated by the Jubilee Party, with the National Super Alliance (NASA) serving as the principal opposition coalition. Its tenure was characterised by significant political developments, including the 2018 Kenya handshake between Kenyatta and opposition leader Raila Odinga, the subsequent formation of the Building Bridges Initiative (BBI), and the constitutional controversy surrounding the initiative, which was ultimately declared unconstitutional by the Supreme Court of Kenya in March 2022.

== Overview ==
The 12th Parliament of Kenya served from 2017 to 2022, overlapping with Uhuru Kenyatta's second term in office. The period was marked by political realignments, increased party loyalty in legislative voting, and legal and political disputes surrounding constitutional changes such as the Building Bridges Initiative (BBI). Researchers have defined the 12th Parliament as a turning point in Kenya's democratic consolidation and the balance between the executive and legislature.

== Background ==
After the 2017 general election, the Jubilee Party coalition rose as the leading force in Parliament. The initial years of the Parliament functioned through high levels of party loyalty and broad support of the executive branch. However, this dynamic shifted in 2018 when President Kenyatta and Raila Odinga, the opposition leader, made changes to Kenya's political environment and set the foundation for the Building Bridges Initiative (BBI).

During this period, Parliament functioned under Kenya's 2010 Constitution, a document that featured checks on the executive, a more independent judiciary and the improvement of county governments, structuring how the 12th Parliament carried out its work. As a result, the 12th Parliament took on an important role in both enforcing and interpreting the reforms mandated by the constitution. Yet, the combination of a new constitutional framework and Kenya's political landscape with shifting alliances led to divisions within the parties and shaped policy direction.

== Political Dynamics and Party Alliances ==
Research suggests that Kenya's members of Parliament often vote along party lines, displaying loyalty to their political parties. According to Jensen, Kuenzi, and Lee (2020), party dominance reduced the members of Parliament's freedom to vote independently and this dynamic continued throughout the period of the 12th Parliament.

Following the Handshake, the opposition coalition, NASA and the Jubilee Party coalition experienced political realignments. These shifting alliances impacted committee membership, changed legislative efforts, and affected the unity of the parliamentary coalitions.

== Legislative Behavior and Oversight Capacity ==
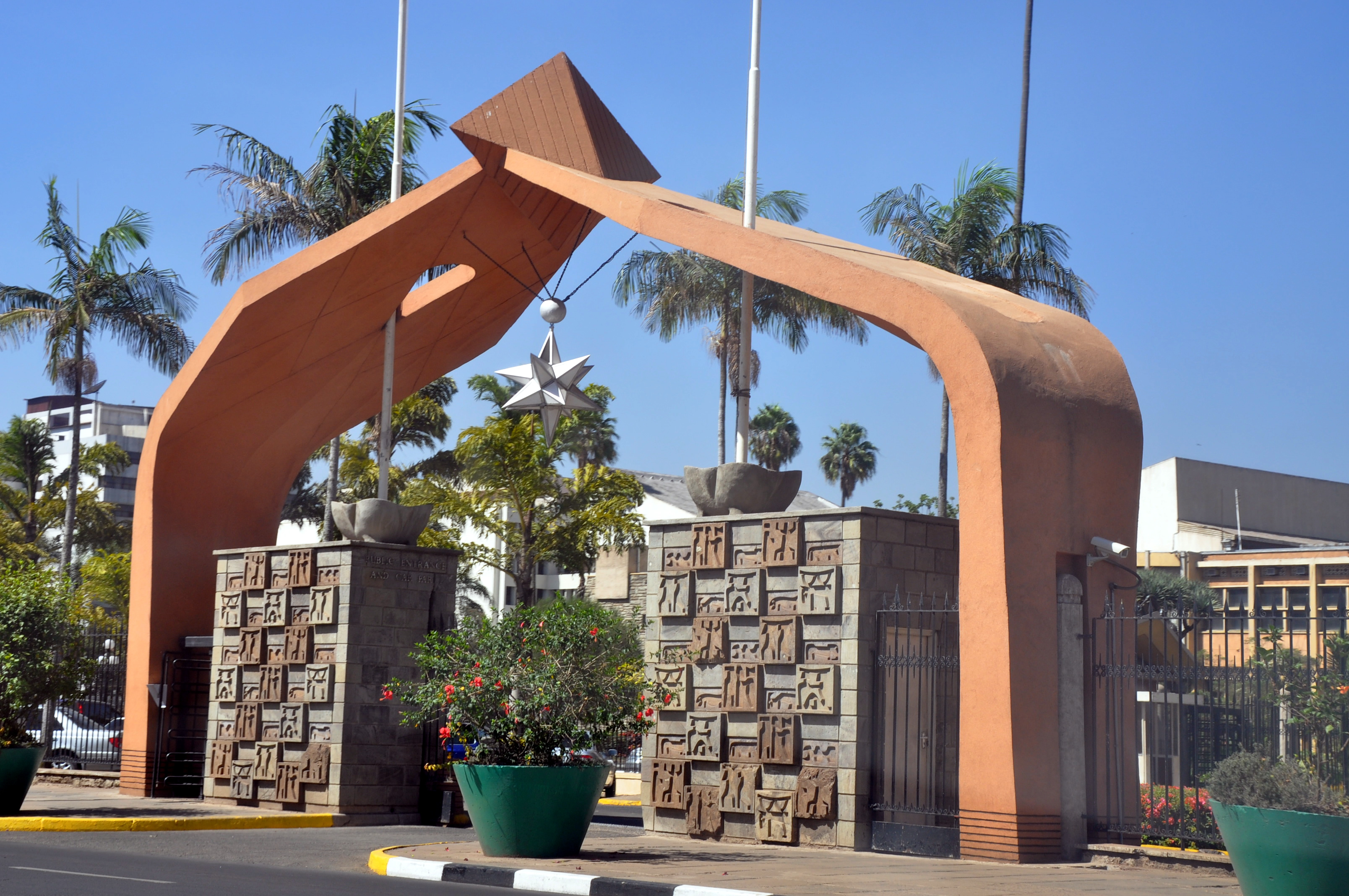
The Parliament Buildings in Nairobi, Kenya. CC-BY-SA 2.0

=== Parliament & the Executive ===
While Parliament grew stronger, it did not limit the strength of the executive branch, causing the executive to have control over lawmaking and dominate the legislative agenda. Cheeseman (2024) notes that even with improvements in the judiciary, Parliament remained limited by executive authority. As a result, Parliament was prevented from challenging or monitoring government actions.

=== Oversight on Public Debt ===
According to a 2022 report from the National Democratic Institute (NDI), Parliament faced difficulties in exercising strong oversight of government borrowing, which made them unable to manage the growing public debt. Since members of Parliament relied on information relayed from the executive, they were unable to independently exercise oversight over financial decisions.

=== Committee System ===
During the 12th Parliament, legislative committees maintained their importance in distributing political influence. Opalo (2022) argues that committee placements were shaped by patronage ties, enabling members of Parliament to use them for political power instead of policy or oversight.

=== The Building Bridges Initiative ===
The Building Bridges Initiative (BBI) was born following the Handshake between Kenyatta and Odinga as a set of constitutional reforms that sought to reduce electoral violence, build unity, and modify the executive system. The central reforms of the initiative included adding a Prime Minister to redistribute executive authority from a single office and expanding legislative representation, increasing the number of elected representatives.

=== Constitutional Process ===
Bhatia (2025) and other experts emphasize that the Building Bridges Initiative (BBI) raised concerns about the amendment processes of the constitution and public participation. The judiciary blocked the initiative after concluding that parts of it overstepped constitutional amendment constraints, ruling it as unconstitutional.

=== The Building Bridges Initiative's Failure ===
According to Omulo (2023), the failure of the Building Bridges Initiative (BBI) was due to internal divisions and shifting alliances among members of Parliament. A combination of conflicting party agendas, concerns over executive empowerment, and divisions in the Jubilee Party coalition contributed to the initiative's failure.

== Accountability & Governance ==
=== Sanctions & Local Accountability ===
Mbate (2023) finds that Parliament lacked the tools for sanctions and their oversight capacities remained weak. Political pressures and a lack of enforcement authority interfered with Parliament's ability to monitor and hold officials accountable across all levels of government.

=== Impact on Democratization ===
Experts are divided on whether the 12th Parliament had a role in strengthening Kenya's democratization. Although the period of the Parliament had seen institutional strengthening, executive dominance and authority, party loyalty, and limited oversight ultimately restricted democratic growth and reform.

=== Overall Impact ===
The 12th Parliament is widely viewed as a significant turning point in Kenya's government institutions. The legislature had presided over the Building Bridges Initiative (BBI), reform effort, major realignments, illustrating the capacities and weaknesses of Kenya's constitutional system.

== See also ==
- List of members of the National Assembly of Kenya, 2017–2022
