= Bomet =

Bomet County
- Municipality
- Location within Kenya
- Coordinates: 0°47′S 35°21′E
- Country: Kenya
- County: Bomet County

Population (2009)
  - Total: 110,963
- Time zone: UTC+3 (EAT)
- Climate: Cfb

Bomet town is the capital and largest town of Bomet County, Kenya. Bomet town has a total population of 110,963 (2009 census). It is located along the B3 Mai Mahiu-Narok-Kisii road. Bomet town is one of the eight sister cities to Milwaukee.

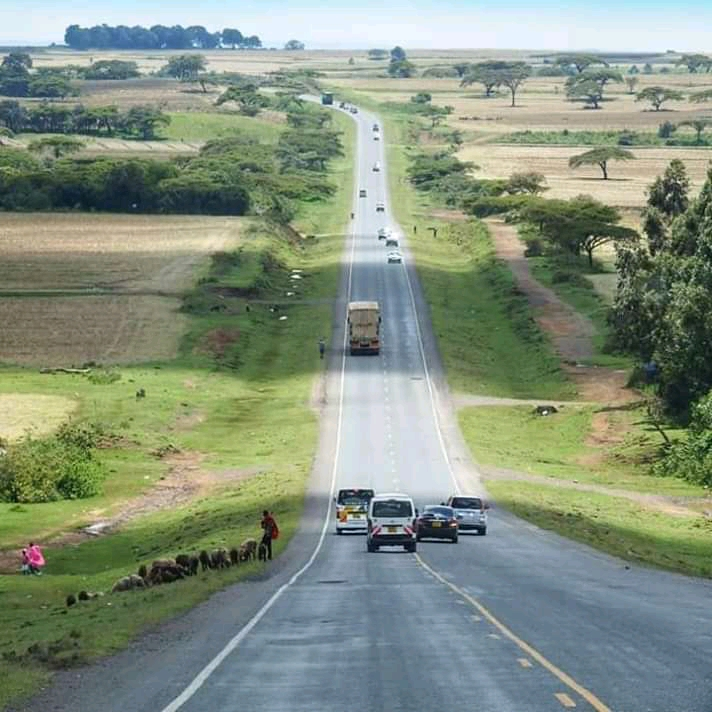
Narok-Bomet road, near Maasai Mara game reserve

== Etymology ==
Bomet is a borrowed word from Swahili language word 'boma' meaning a traditional fenced parameter for cattle to spend the night in. The Kipsigis word 'Kaaptich' is the correct term for such a structure though. The eponymous term was coined following establishment of an industrial scale butchery which used to observe large herds of cattle rounded together in a large scale cow parameter.

== History ==
Bomet used to be known as Soot or So`t (not to be confused with Sotik) but was eventually renamed Bomet to in part break the confusion between Bomet town and Sotik town.

== Administration ==
Bomet municipality has six wards (Cheboin, Emkwen, Itembe, Township and Tuluapmosonik). These wards are split between Bomet, Chepalungu, Konoin and Sotik constituencies.

== Economic activities ==
The main economic activity in Bomet is agriculture. Tea is mostly grown in the eastern region of the district bordering the Mau forest. Farmers in the tea-producing region sell their produce to KTDA (Kenya Tea Development Agency) factories such as those at Kapset, Mogogosiek, Rororok, Kapkoros and Tirgaga located in Bomet county. There are also other multinational tea companies such as George Williamson, Unilever and James Finlay (Kenya) Limited which have tea factories in the county.

== Medical facilities ==
Tenwek Mission Hospital is a 300+ bed hospital and training center located in Bomet. Being the area's primary hospital, Tenwek serves as a referral hospital.

Longisa hospital is a level 4 county government health care facility located in Longisa which has a bed capacity of 144.

== High schools in Bomet ==
- Moi Siongiroi Girls
- Sibaiyan Secondary School
- Makimeny secondary school
- Kanusin Secondary School
- Kaptulwa secondary school
- Kaboson Secondary school
- Chebunyo secondary School
- Gelegele Secondary School
- Ndanai Secondary School
- Kapoleseroi Secondary school
- Kipsonoi Secondary School
- Mogor Secondary School
- Longisa Boys High School
- Sigor High school
- Kamureito High School
- Kabusare Secondary School
- Olbutyo Boys High School
- Saseta Girls Secondary School
- Tenwek High School
- Chemaner High School
- Kimuchul Secondary School
- Kipsuter Boys Secondary School
- Kabungut Boys
- Boito Boys High School
- Itembe Secondary school
- Manyatta Secondary School
- Solyot Secondary School
- kaptebengwet secondary school
- Tarakwa High School

∗ Chepwostuiyet High School

- Kaplong Boys High School
