= County woman representative =

Member of the Kenyan National Assembly

A county women representative is a member of the National Assembly of Kenya who represents each one of the 47 counties in an at-large seat reserved for female members. The county women representatives serve in the national assembly alongside the 290 members elected from the constituencies, 12 nominated members and the Speaker of the National Assembly.

== History ==
The role of Women's Representative was created by the current Constitution of Kenya, which was adopted in a referendum in 2010, in order to increase the representation of women in parliament. Prior to the 2010 constitution there were fewer than 20 female members in the Kenyan parliament. The first woman representatives were elected in the 2013 Kenyan general election.

The women representatives are elected by all registered voters in the county they represent, not only female voters. In 2019 the Committee on Implementation and Oversight of the Constitution proposed abolishing the role after the next general election.

While the Constitution of Kenya requires that no more than two thirds of the National Assembly or the Senate be of the same gender, this requirement has not been met. In 2017 the High Court ruled that the two houses had failed to perform their constitutional obligation. Despite attempts to introduce new legislation to ensure increased representation of women in parliament, this situation has not been resolved.

Following the 2017 general election, in addition to the 47 woman representatives, 23 women were elected to the constituency seats and 5 women were nominated. Consequently, a total of 75 women served in the National Assembly during the 12th Parliament of Kenya, comprising 21% of the members of the assembly.
