= Jubilee Party =

Nationalist political party in Kenya

Jubilee Party of Kenya
- Secretary-General: Moitalel Ole Kenta
- Founded: 7 September 2016
- Merger of: see below
- Headquarters: State House Road Nairobi
- Ideology: Conservatism; Economic liberalism National conservatism African socialism
- Political position: Centre-right to right-wing
- European affiliation: European Conservatives and Reformists Party (regional partner, until 2022)
- Colours: Red
- Slogan: Mbele Pamoja ("Forward Together")
- National Assembly: 29 / 349
- Senate: 3 / 67
- Governors: 1 / 47

Website
- jubileeparty.ke

The Jubilee Party of Kenya is a major political party in Kenya. It has significantly influenced the country's political landscape since its founding on 8 September 2016. Emerging from a merger of 11 smaller parties, including The National Alliance (TNA) led by then-President Uhuru Kenyatta and the United Republican Party (URP) led by then-Deputy President William Ruto, Jubilee quickly became the ruling party. It secured a strong plurality in Parliament during the 2017 elections, cementing its dominance as Uhuru Kenyatta won re-election as president.

However, internal divisions surfaced soon after the 2017 election. President Kenyatta criticized Deputy President Ruto for "kutangatanga" (loitering around), accusing him of prioritizing political campaigns over his responsibilities. These tensions escalated over time, culminating in Ruto's departure from Jubilee in 2022 to join the United Democratic Alliance (UDA). He used UDA as his political platform, successfully winning the presidency in the August 2022 general elections.

President Kenyatta openly endorsed opposition leader Raila Odinga in the run-up to those elections forming the Azimio la Umoja Coalition between Jubilee and the Orange Democratic Movement (ODM). This unusual alliance failed to secure victory, relegating Jubilee and Azimio to opposition status after UDA's triumph.

As of 2024, Jubilee remains deeply divided, with factions split between supporting the government and maintaining their opposition stance.

Rafael Tuju, former Member of Parliament for Rarieda Constituency was the party's first Secretary General. The officials were named during the party's first National Governing Council (NGC) meeting held at the Bomas of Kenya Auditorium, in November 2016. Each of the political parties that merged had elected leaders at different levels of government, as follows:

	Governors	Senators	Women Reps.	MPs.
TNA	8	11	14	75
APK	1	2		5
URP	10	9	10	65
GNU	1			
NFK	1		2	4
Ford People				4
UDF	1	2		12
CCU				2
Republican Congress				
JAP				1
TIP				1

== Membership ==
Membership of the party is acquired by application, recommendation, nomination and registration. On payment of the prescribed fee, a member is issued a membership number in digital form and a smart card. The card is proof of membership and contains the name, identity number and mobile phone number. While the card was intended to prevent fraud during party primaries and nominations before the general election of 2017, those without the card were still able to vote in the primaries if they had a Kenyan identity card.

== History ==
=== Founding ===
The Jubilee Party is considered to be the successor of the Jubilee Alliance. The Jubilee Alliance was a political alliance established in January 2013 to support Kenyatta's presidential campaign. Under President Uhuru Kenyatta, the Jubilee Alliance governed through a party coalition. However, the stability of this system was threatened by tribalism and disagreements between parties. In 2016, the Jubilee Alliance's leadership, including President Kenyatta, decided to transition from a coalition government to a single unified party, the Jubilee Party. The new party was formed from the principal members of the Jubilee Alliance's previous coalition, as well as new political parties. These founding parties were:

1. Jubilee Alliance Party (JAP)
2. Alliance Party of Kenya (APK)
3. United Republican Party (URP)
4. Grand National Union (GNU)
5. New FORD–Kenya (NFK)
6. FORD People (FP)
7. United Democratic Forum (UDF)
8. Chama Cha Uzalendo (CCU)
9. Republican Congress (RC)
10. The National Alliance (TNA)^{[5]}
11. The Independence Party (TIP)

The party merger was made official on 7 September 2016, when all involved parties held their respective National delegates Conferences (NDC). The new political party was announced to the public at a ceremony held at the Safaricom Kasarani Stadium on 8 September 2016.

=== 2017 general election ===
The Jubilee Party was one of the primary competitors during Kenya's 2017 general elections. The election was preceded by multiple acts of violence, challenging the lawfulness of the elections. Deputy President William Ruto's house was attacked by a single intruder, who killed a guard in the process. In addition, Christopher Msando, a senior election official, was found murdered only a few days before voting began. His death raised concerns, both domestically and abroad, regarding the possibility of electoral fraud.

After months of campaigning, elections were held on 8 August 2017. The Jubilee Party made significant gains in the 2017 General election, winning 140 of 290 parliamentary seats, 25 of 47 County women representatives seats, 24 of 47 senatorial seats, and 25 of the 47 governors. The party's candidate and the incumbent president, Uhuru Kenyatta, won the election by a comfortable margin, receiving 8,223,369 which was 54.17% against ODM leader Raila Odinga who garnered 6,822,812 which translates to 44.94% of the total votes cast. However, the results of the first election were annulled by the Supreme Court of Kenya following a successful petition from the runner-up, Raila Odinga, who questioned the authenticity of the official vote. A second election was held on 26 October, which Odinga boycotted, citing his desire for electoral reform. Opposition protests in Nairobi, Kisumu and Mombasa were banned by the Jubilee Party in the weeks leading up to the second election. With no formal opposition, the Jubilee ticket received a near unanimous percentage of the vote, ensuring Kenyatta's victory.

Large protests broke out soon after the results of the second round of voting were announced. Protesters suggested that the original election had been rigged by the Jubilee Party, allegations which the government denied. These protests, while far more subdued than the crisis following the 2007 elections, resulted in the deaths of dozens of civilians. According to Amnesty International, at least 33 of these deaths were attributed to Kenyan police.

=== 2019 party infighting ===
In January 2019, the Jubilee Party experienced a significant amount of political infighting, beginning when interim vice-chairman David Murathe resigned from the party. His resignation was a response to the 2022 Presidential election, which had been the primary focus of party debate. In particular, the Jubilee Party had been internally divided over its support of Deputy President Ruto as the official party candidate. The struggle led to the politicization of government initiatives, resulting in delays in public infrastructure programs, such as dam construction, as well as anti-corruption efforts targeting Ruto. Some experts expressed concerns that the growing schism within the party could reignite ethnic conflict within the Rift Valley region. Mass ethnic violence has occurred in the region previously, in the aftermath of the 2007 election results, during which 650 people were killed, and tens of thousands were internally displaced.

In the following months, the situation within the party worsened. In the aftermath of Murathe's resignation, Secretary-General Tuju announced an expansion in party offices and infrastructure, as well as promising to hold party meetings and elections. However, party leadership was either unable or unwilling to carry out these commitments. As a result of infighting, the Jubilee's Party's position over the nation's politics weakened. The number of party applications skyrocketed, with over 30 parties forming since the 2017 election.

== Leadership ==
As of January 2026 Hon. Moitalel Ole Kenta, was picked as the new Secretary General from the former SG, Jeremiah Ngayu Kioni. Uhuru Kenyatta resigned as its party leader on 15 September after a High Court ruling regurgitated that former presidents can't serve as party leaders after 6 months of leaving office.

== Electoral history ==
=== Presidential elections ===
Election	Party Candidate	Running mate	Votes	%	Result
2013	Uhuru Kenyatta	William Ruto	6,173,433	50.07%	Won
2017	Uhuru Kenyatta	William Ruto	8,223,369	54.17%	Won
Oct 2017	Uhuru Kenyatta	William Ruto	7,483,895	98.26%	Won
2022	None (supported Azimio la Umoja)	—	—	—	Lost

=== National Assembly elections ===
Election	Party leader	Votes		%	Seats	+/–	Position
2017	Uhuru Kenyatta	Constituency	6,029,273	40.20%	169 / 349	▲169	▲1st
2017	Uhuru Kenyatta	County	6,337,957	41.79%	169 / 349	▲169	▲1st
2022	Uhuru Kenyatta	Constituency	—	—	28 / 349	▼141	▼3rd
2022	Uhuru Kenyatta	County	—	—	28 / 349	▼141	▼3rd

=== Senate elections ===
Election	Party leader	Votes	%	Seats	+/–	Position
2017	Uhuru Kenyatta	6,265,112	41.46%	34 / 67	▲34	▲1st
2022	Uhuru Kenyatta	—	—	3 / 67	▼31	▼3rd
