= 13th Parliament of Kenya =

2022– 2027 parliament of Kenya

| ← | 12th | 14th | → |
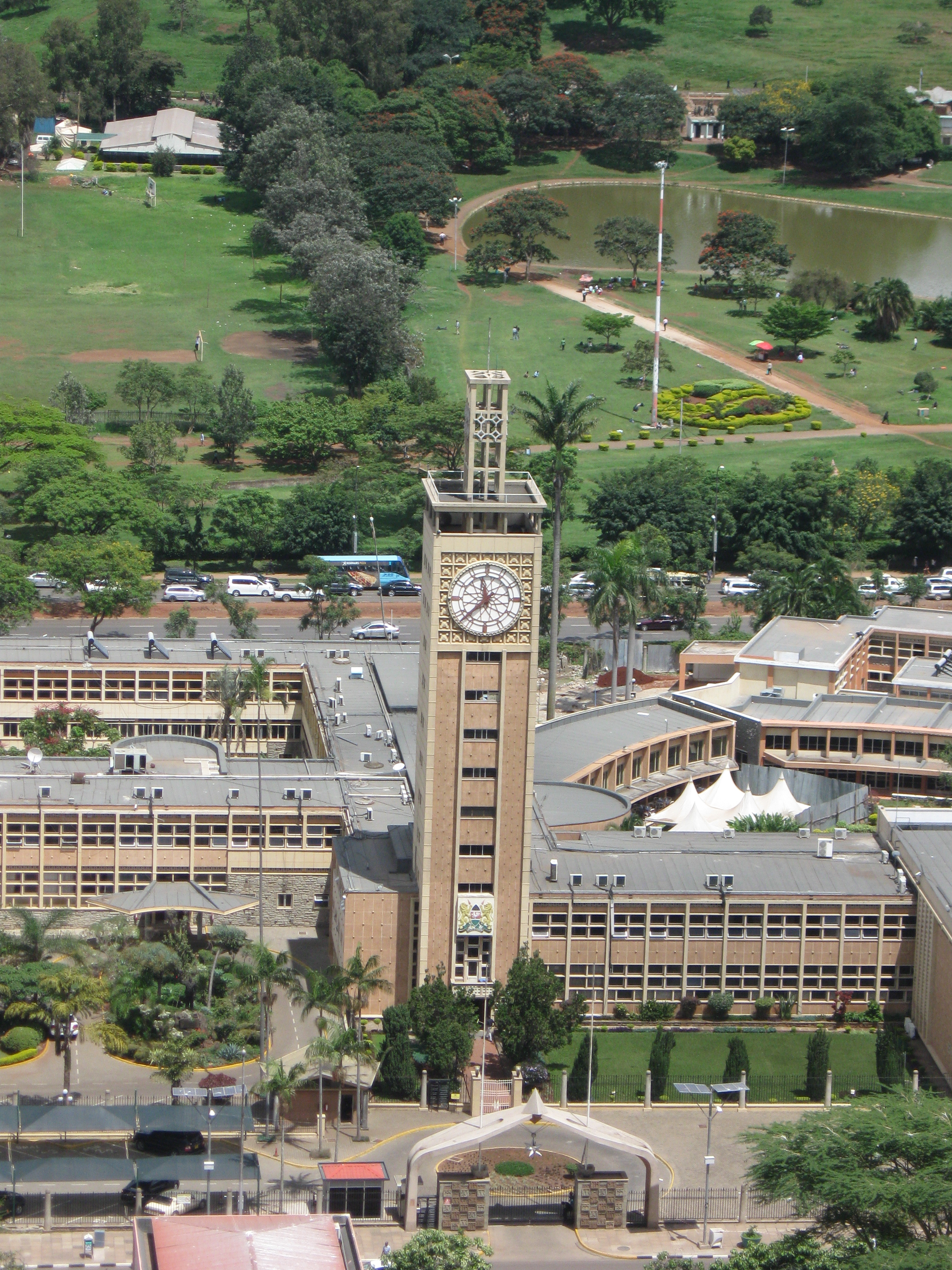
- Parliamentary Buildings, Nairobi

Overview
- Legislative body: Parliament of Kenya
- Meeting place: Nairobi
- Term: 8 September 2022 –
- Election: 9 August 2022
- Government: Kenya Kwanza
- Opposition: Azimio la Umoja–One Kenya Coalition
- Website: www.parliament.go.ke

National Assembly
- Members: 349
- Speaker: Moses Wetang'ula
- Deputy Speaker: Gladys Boss Shollei
- Majority Leader: Kimani Ichung'wah
- Minority Leader: Junet Mohamed
- Party control: Kenya Kwanza

Senate
- Members: 67
- Speaker: Amason Kingi
- Deputy Speaker: Kathuri Murungi
- Majority Leader: Aaron Cheruiyot
- Minority Leader: Stewart Madzayo
- Party control: Kenya Kwanza

Sessions
- 1st: 8 September 2022 –

The 13th Parliament of Kenya was constituted following the general election of 9 August 2022 and held its inaugural sitting on 8 September 2022. Serving during the first term of President William Ruto, it comprises 416 members, 349 in the National Assembly and 67 in the Senate. Its a bicameral legislature split between the Kenya Kwanza and Azimio la Umoja coalitions. The National Assembly has 82 women members, six more than in the 12th Parliament, while 193 of its members were re-elected in 2022, an increase of 50 from the 2017 general election. Its tenure has been characterised by significant legislative and political developments including the controversy surrounding the Finance Bill 2024 and the impeachment of Deputy President Rigathi Gachagua in October 2024.

== Composition ==
The composition of both chambers is as follows: Azimio la Umoja makes up the majority in the National Assembly, while Kenya Kwanza has the majority in the Senate.

=== National Assembly ===
| Party or alliance | | Constituency | | | County | | | Seats | | |
| Party or alliance | | Votes | % | Seats | Votes | % | Seats | Appointed | Total | +/– |
|---|---|---|---|---|---|---|---|---|---|---|
| Azimio La Umoja | ODM | | | – | | | – | – | 85 | – |
| Azimio La Umoja | JP | | | | | | | – | 29 | – |
| Azimio La Umoja | Wiper | | | | | | | – | 25 | – |
| Azimio La Umoja | DAP – K | | | | | | | – | 5 | New |
| Azimio La Umoja | KANU | | | | | | | – | 5 | – |
| Azimio La Umoja | UDM | | | | | | | – | 5 | New |
| Azimio La Umoja | PAA | | | | | | | – | 4 | New |
| Azimio La Umoja | MCCP | | | | | | | – | 2 | – |
| Azimio La Umoja | UPIA | | | | | | | – | 2 | New |
| Azimio La Umoja | MDG | | | | | | | – | 1 | New |
| Azimio La Umoja | UPA | | | | | | | – | 1 | New |
| Azimio La Umoja | UDP | | | | | | | – | 2 | New |
| Azimio La Umoja | KUP | | | | | | | – | 1 | New |
| Azimio La Umoja | Total | | | | | | | – | 167 | – |
| Kenya Kwanza | UDA | | | | | | | – | 138 | New |
| Kenya Kwanza | ANC | | | | | | | – | 7 | – |
| Kenya Kwanza | FORD – K | | | | | | | – | 6 | – |
| Kenya Kwanza | TSP | | | | | | | – | 2 | New |
| Kenya Kwanza | CCK | | | | | | | – | 1 | New |
| Kenya Kwanza | DP | | | | | | | – | 1 | – |
| Kenya Kwanza | Total | | | | | | | – | 155 | – |
| GDDP | | | | | | | | – | 1 | New |
| KENDA | | | | | | | | – | 1 | – |
| NOPEU | | | | | | | | – | 1 | New |
| Independents | | | | | | | | – | 12 | New |
| Total | | | | | | | | – | 337 | 0 |
Source: NTV (Kenya)

=== Senate ===
| Party | Seats |
|---|---|
| Kenya Kwanza | 24 |
| Azimio La Umoja | 23 |
| Other parties and independents | – |
| To be declared | – |
| Total | 47 |
Source: NTV Kenya

== National Assembly members ==
=== Constituency members of parliament ===
| Constituency | MP | Party |
|---|---|---|
| Ainabkoi | Samuel Chepkonga | UDA |
| Ainamoi | Benjamin Langat | UDA |
| Aldai | Marianne Jebet Kitany | UDA |
| Alego Usonga | Samuel Atandi | ODM |
| Awendo | John Owino | ODM |
| Bahati | Irene Mrembo Njoki | Jubilee Party |
| Balambala | Abdi Omar Shurie | Jubilee Party |
| Banissa | Kulow Maalim Hassan | UDM |
| Baringo Central | Joshua Chepyegon Kandie | UDA |
| Baringo North | Joseph Kipkoross Makilap | UDA |
| Baringo South | Charles Kamuren | UDA |
| Belgut | Nelson Koech | UDA |
| Bobasi | Innocent Obiri | Wiper |
| Bomachoge Borabu | Obadiah Barongo | ODM |
| Bomachoge Chache | Miruka Ondieki Alfah | UDA |
| Bomet Central | Richard Kilel | UDA |
| Bomet East | Richard Yegon Kipkemoi | UDA |
| Bonchari | Charles Mamwacha Onchoke | UPA |
| Bondo | Gideon Ochanda Ogolla | ODM |
| Borabu | Patrick Kibagendi Osero | ODM |
| Budalangi | Raphael Bitta Sauti Wanjala | ODM |
| Bumula | Jack Wamboka | DAP–K |
| Bura | Yakub Adow | UPIA |
| Bureti | Kibet Kirui Komingoi | UDA |
| Butere | Nicholas Scott Tindi Mwale | ODM |
| Butula | Joseph Maelo Oyula | ODM |
| Buuri | Mugambi Ridikiri Murwithania | UDA |
| Central Imenti | Moses Nguchine Kirima | UDA |
| Changamwe | Omar Mwinyi | ODM |
| Chepalungu | Victor Koech | CCM |
| Cherangany | Patrick Simiyu Barasa | DAP–K |
| Chesumei | Paul Kibichiy Biego | UDA |
| Chuka Igambang'ombe | Patrick Munene Ntwiga | UDA |
| Dadaab | Farah Maalim | Wiper |
| Dagoretti North | Beatrice Elachi | ODM |
| Dagoretti South | John Kiarie Waweru | UDA |
| Eldama Ravine | Musa Sirma | UDA |
| Eldas | Adan Keynan Wehliye | ODM |
| Embakasi Central | Benjamin Mwangi | UDA |
| Embakasi East | Babu Owino | ODM |
| Embakasi North | James Gakuya | UDA |
| Embakasi South | Julius Mwathe | Wiper |
| Embakasi West | Mark Mwenje | Jubilee Party |
| Emgwen | Josses Kiptoo Kosgei Lelmengit | UDA |
| Emuhaya | Milemba Amboko | ANC |
| Emurua Dikirr | David Keter | UDA |
| Endebess | Robert Pukose | UDA |
| Fafi | Salah Yakub Farah | UDA |
| Funyula | Wilberforce Oundo | ODM |
| Galole | Said Buya Hiribae | ODM |
| Ganze | Charo Kenneth Kazungu Tungule | PAA |
| Garissa Township | Aden Duale | UDA |
| Garsen | Ali Wario Guyo | ODM |
| Gatanga | Edward Muriu | UDA |
| Gatundu North | Elijah Njoroge Kururia | Independent |
| Gatundu South | Gabriel Gathuka Kagombe | UDA |
| Gem | Elisha Odhiambo | ODM |
| Gichugu | Robert Gichimu Githinji | UDA |
| Gilgil | Martha Wangari Wanjira | UDA |
| Githunguri | Gathoni Wamuchomba | UDA |
| Hamisi | Charles Gimose | ANC |
| Homa Bay Town | Peter Kaluma | ODM |
| Igembe Central | Dan Kiili Karitho | Jubilee Party |
| Igembe North | Julius Taitumu M'anaiba | UDA |
| Igembe South | John Paul Mwirigi | UDA |
| Ijara | Abdi Ali Sheikhow | NAP–K |
| Ikolomani | Bernard Shinali | ODM |
| Isiolo North | Joseph Samal Lomwa | Jubilee Party |
| Isiolo South | Mohamed Tupi | Jubilee Party |
| Jomvu | Bady Twalib | ODM |
| Juja | George Koimburi Ndungu | UDA |
| Kabete | James Githua Kamau Wamacukuru | UDA |
| Kabondo Kasipul | Eve Akinyi Obara | ODM |
| Kabuchai | Joseph Simiyu Wekesa Majimbo Kalasinga | FORD–Kenya |
| Kacheliba | Titus Lotee | KUP |
| Kaiti | Joshua Kivinda Kimilu | Wiper |
| Kajiado Central | Elijah Memusi Ole Kanchory | ODM |
| Kajiado East | Kakuta Maimai Hamisi | ODM |
| Kajiado North | Onesmus Ngogoyo Nguro | UDA |
| Kajiado South | Samuel Parashina Sakimba | ODM |
| Kajiado West | George Sunkuyia Risa | UDA |
| Kaloleni | Katana Paul Kahindi | ODM |
| Kamukunji | Yusuf Hassan Abdi | Jubilee Party |
| Kandara | Alice Muthoni Wahome | UDA |
| Kanduyi | John Makali | FORD–Kenya |
| Kangema | Peter Irungu Kihungi | UDA |
| Kangundo | Fabian Kyule Mule | GDDP |
| Kapenguria | Samwel Moroto Chumel | UDA |
| Kapseret | Oscar Kipchumba Sudi | UDA |
| Karachuonyo | Andrew Adipo Okuome | ODM |
| Kasarani | Ronald Karauri | Independent |
| Kasipul | Boyd Were Ong'ondo | Orange Democratic Movement (ODM) |
| Kathiani | Robert Mbui | Wiper |
| Keiyo North | Adams Kipsanai Korir | UDA |
| Keiyo South | Gideon Kimaiyo Kipkoech | UDA |
| Kesses | Julius Kipletting Rutto | UDA |
| Khwisero | Christopher Aseka Wangaya | ODM |
| Kiambaa | John Njuguna Wanjiku | UDA |
| Kiambu | John Machua Waithaka | UDA |
| Kibra | Peter Ochieng Orero | ODM |
| Kibwezi East | Jessica Nduku Kiko Mbalu | Wiper |
| Kibwezi West | Eckomas Mwengi Mutuse | MCCP |
| Kieni | Antony Njoroge Wainaina | UDA |
| Kigumo | Joseph Kamau Munyoro | UDA |
| Kiharu | Samson Ndindi Nyoro | UDA |
| Kikuyu | Kimani Ichung'wah | UDA |
| Kilgoris | Julius Sunkuli | KANU |
| Kilifi North | Owen Yaa Baya | UDA |
| Kilifi South | Richard Ken Chonga Kiti | ODM |
| Kilome | Thuddeus Kithua Nzambia | Wiper |
| Kimilili | Didmus Wekesa Barasa Mutua | UDA |
| Kiminini | Maurice Kakai Bisau | DAP–K |
| Kinango | Samuel Gonzi Rai | PAA |
| Kinangop | Zachary Thuku Kwenya | Jubilee Party |
| Kipipiri | Muhia Wanjiku | UDA |
| Kipkelion East | Joseph Kimutai Cherorot | UDA |
| Kipkelion West | Hillary Kiplangat Kosgei | UDA |
| Kirinyaga Central | Gachoki Gitari | UDA |
| Kisauni | Rashid Juma Bedzimba | ODM |
| Kisumu Central | Joshua Odongo Oron | ODM |
| Kisumu East | Shakeel Shabbir | Independent |
| Kisumu West | Rozaah Akinyi Buyu | ODM |
| Kitui Central | Makali Benson Mulu | Wiper |
| Kitui East | Nimrod Mbithuka Mbai | UDA |
| Kitui Rural | David Mwalika Mboni | Wiper |
| Kitui South | Rachael Kaki Nyamai | Jubilee Party |
| Kitui West | Edith Vethi Nyenze | Wiper |
| Kitutu Chache North | Nyakundi Japheth Mokaya | UDA |
| Kitutu Chache South | Antoney Kibagendi | ODM |
| Kitutu Masaba | Clive Ombane Gisairo | ODM |
| Konoin | Yegon Brighton Leonard | UDA |
| Kuresoi North | Alfred Kiprono Mutai | UDA |
| Kuresoi South | Joseph Kipkosgei Tonui | UDA |
| Kuria East | Marwa Kitayama | UDA |
| Kuria West | Mathias Robi | UDA |
| Kwanza | Ferdinand Kevin Wanyonyi | FORD–Kenya |
| Lafey | Mohamed Abdi Abdirahman | Jubilee Party |
| Lagdera | Abdikadir Hussein Mohamed | ODM |
| Laikipia East | Mwangi Kiunjuri | TSP |
| Laikipia North | Sarah Paulata Korere | Jubilee Party |
| Laikipia West | Wachira Wachira Karani | UDA |
| Laisamis | Joseph Lekuton | UDM |
| Lamu East | Ruweida Mohamed Obo | Jubilee Party |
| Lamu West | Muiruri Muthama Stanley | Jubilee Party |
| Langata | Phelix Odiwuor Khodhe | ODM |
| Lari | Joseph Mburu Kahangara | UDA |
| Likoni | Mishi Juma Khamisi Mboko | ODM |
| Likuyani | Innocent Mugabe | ODM |
| Limuru | John Kiragu Chege | UDA |
| Loima | Protus Ewesit Akuja | UDA |
| Luanda | Dick Maungu | DAP–K |
| Lugari | Nabii Daraja Nabwera | ODM |
| Lunga Lunga | Mangale Munga Chiforomodo | ODM |
| Lurambi | Titus Khamala | ODM |
| Maara | Japhet Miriti Kareke Mbiuki | UDA |
| Machakos Town | Caleb Mutiso Mule | Wiper |
| Magarini | Harrison Garama Kombe | ODM |
| Makadara | George Aladwa | ODM |
| Makueni | Suzanne Ndunge Kiamba | Wiper |
| Malava | Moses Malulu Injendi | ANC |
| Malindi | Amina Laura Mnyazi | ODM |
| Mandera East | Husseinweytan Mohamed Abdirahman | ODM |
| Mandera North | Bashir Sheikh Abdullahi | UDM |
| Mandera South | Abdul Ebraim Haro | UDM |
| Mandera West | Adan Haji Yussuf | UDM |
| Manyatta | John Gitonga Mwaniki Mukunji | UDA |
| Maragwa | Mary Wamaua Waithira Njoroge | UDA |
| Marakwet East | David Kangogo Bowen | UDA |
| Marakwet West | Timothy Kipchumba Toroitich | Independent |
| Masinga | Joshua Mbithi Mutua Mwalyo | Independent |
| Matayos | Godffrey Odanga | ODM |
| Mathare | Anthony Oluoch | ODM |
| Mathioya | Edwin Mugo Gichuki | UDA |
| Mathira | Eric Mwangi Kahugu | UDA |
| Matuga | Kassim Sawa Tandaza | ANC |
| Matungu | Peter Oscar Nabulindo | ODM |
| Matungulu | Stephen Mutinda Mule | Wiper |
| Mavoko | Patrick Makau King'ola | Wiper |
| Mbeere North | Geoffrey Kariuki Kiringa Ruku | DP |
| Mbeere South | Benard Muriuki Nebert | Independent |
| Mbooni | Erastus Kivasu Nzioka | Wiper |
| Mogotio | Reuben Kiborek Kipngor | UDA |
| Moiben | Phylis Jepkemoi Bartoo | UDA |
| Molo | Francis Kuria Kimani | UDA |
| Mosop | Abraham Kipsang Kirwa | UDA |
| Moyale | Guyo Waqo Jaldesa | UPIA |
| Msambweni | Feisal Abdallah Bader Salim | UDA |
| Mt. Elgon | Fred Kapondi Chesebe | UDA |
| Muhoroni | James Onyango Oyoo | ODM |
| Mukurweini | Kaguchia John Philip Gichohi | UDA |
| Mumias East | Peter Kalerwa Salasya | DAP–K |
| Mumias West | Johnson Manya Naicca | ODM |
| Mvita | Machele Mohamed Soud | ODM |
| Mwala | Vincent Musyoka Musau | UDA |
| Mwatate | Peter Mbogho Shake | JP |
| Mwea | Mary Maingi | UDA |
| Mwingi Central | Gedion Mutemi Mulyungi | Wiper |
| Mwingi North | Paul Musyimi Nzengu | Wiper |
| Mwingi West | Charles Ngusya Nguna | Wiper |
| Naivasha | Jayne Wanjiru Njeri Kihara | UDA |
| Nakuru Town East | David Gikaria | UDA |
| Nakuru Town West | Samuel Arama | JP |
| Nambale | Geoffey Mulanywa | Independent |
| Nandi Hills | Benard Kibor Kitur | UDA |
| Narok East | Lemanken Aramat | UDA |
| Narok North | Agnes Mantaine Pareyio | JP |
| Narok South | Kitilai Ole Ntutu | Independent |
| Narok West | Gabriel Koshal Tongoyo | UDA |
| Navakholo | Emmanuel Wangwe | ODM |
| Ndaragwa | George N. Gachagua | UDA |
| Ndhiwa | Martin Peters Owino | ODM |
| Ndia | George Kariuki | UDA |
| Njoro | Charity Kathambi Chepkwony | UDA |
| North Horr | Adhe Wario Guyo | KANU |
| North Imenti | Rahim Dawood Abdul | Independent |
| North Mugirango | Joash Nyamoko | UDA |
| Nyakach | Joshua Aduma Owuor | ODM |
| Nyali | Mohammad Ali | UDA |
| Nyando | Jared Okello Odoyo | ODM |
| Nyaribari Chache | Zeheer Jhanda | UDA |
| Nyaribari Masaba | Daniel Ogwoka Manduku | ODM |
| Nyatike | Tom Mboya Odege | ODM |
| Nyeri Town | Duncan Maina Mathenge | UDA |
| Ol Jorok | Michael Muchira | UDA |
| Ol Kalou | Vacant | |
| Othaya | Wambugu Wainaina | UDA |
| Pokot South | David Pkosing | KUP |
| Rabai | Kenga Anthony Mupe | PAA |
| Rangwe | Lillian Gogo | ODM |
| Rarieda | Paul Otiende Amollo | ODM |
| Rongai | Paul Chebor | UDA |
| Rongo | Paul Abuor | ODM |
| Roysambu | Augustine Kamande Mwafrika | UDA |
| Ruaraka | Joseph Tom Kajwang' Francis | ODM |
| Ruiru | Simon Ng'ang'a Kingara | UDA |
| Runyenjes | Eric Muchangi | UDA |
| Sabatia | Clement Sloya | UDA |
| Saboti | Caleb Amisi Luyai | ODM |
| Saku | Dido Ali | UDA |
| Samburu East | Lentoijoni Jackson Lekumontare | KANU |
| Samburu North | Dominic Eli Letipila | UDA |
| Samburu West | Naisula Lesuuda | KANU |
| Seme | James Nyikal | ODM |
| Shinyalu | Fred Akana | ANC |
| Sigor | Peter Lochakapong | UDA |
| Sigowet Soin | Justice Kipsang Kemei | UDA |
| Sirisia | John Waluke Koyi | JP |
| Sotik | Francis Sigei | UDA |
| South Imenti | Shadrack Mwiti Ithinji | JP |
| South Mugirango | Silvanus Osoro | UDA |
| Soy | David Kiplagat | UDA |
| Starehe | Amos Mwago | JP |
| Suba North | Millie Odhiambo | ODM |
| Suba South | Caroli Omondi | ODM |
| Subukia | Samuel Kinuthia Gachobe | UDA |
| Suna East | Junet Mohamed | ODM |
| Suna West | Peter Masara | ODM |
| Tarbaj | Hussein Abdi Barre | UDA |
| Taveta | John Okano Bwire | Wiper |
| Teso North | Edward Oku Kaunya | ODM |
| Teso South | Mary Otucho Emaase | UDA |
| Tetu | Geoffrey Wandeto Mwangi | UDA |
| Tharaka | George Gitonga Murugara | UDA |
| Thika Town | Alice Wambui Ng'ang'a | UDA |
| Tiaty | William Kamket Kassait | KANU |
| Tigania East | Lawrence Mpuru Aburi | NOPEU |
| Tigania West | John Kanyuithia Mutunga | UDA |
| Tinderet | Julius Kibiwott Meli | UDA |
| Tongaren | John Chikati Murumba | FORD–Kenya |
| Turbo | Janet Jepkemboi Sitienei | UDA |
| Turkana Central | Joseph Namuar Emathe | UDA |
| Turkana East | Nicholas Ngikor Nixon Ngikolong | JP |
| Turkana North | Paul Ekwom Nabuin | ODM |
| Turkana South | John Ariko Namoit | ODM |
| Turkana West | Daniel Epuyo Nanok | UDA |
| Ugenya | David Ochieng | MDG |
| Ugunja | Opiyo Wandayi | ODM |
| Uriri | Mark Ogolla Nyamita | ODM |
| Vihiga | Ernest Ogesi | JP |
| Voi | Abdi Chome | JP |
| Wajir East | Adan Mohamed Daud | JP |
| Wajir North | Ibrahim Abdi Saney | UDA |
| Wajir South | Mohamed Adow | ODM |
| Wajir West | Yusuf Farah | ODM |
| Webuye East | Martin Manyonyi | FORD–Kenya |
| Webuye West | Daniel Wanyama | UDA |
| West Mugirango | Stephen Mogaka | JP |
| Westlands | Tim Wanyonyi | ODM |
| Wundanyi | Danson Mwashako | Wiper |
| Yatta | Robert Basil Ngui | Wiper |

=== County Women Representatives ===
| Code | County | Name | Party |
|---|---|---|---|
| 1 | Mombasa | Zamzam Mohamed | ODM |
| 2 | Kwale | Fatuma Masito | ODM |
| 3 | Kilifi | Gertrude Mwanyanje | ODM |
| 4 | Tana River | Amina Dika | KANU |
| 5 | Lamu | Muthoni Marubu | JP |
| 6 | Taita-Taveta | Lydia Haika | UDA |
| 7 | Garissa | Edo Udgoon Siyad | Jubilee Party |
| 8 | Wajir | Fatuma Abdi Jehow | ODM |
| 9 | Mandera | Umul Ker Kassim | UDM |
| 10 | Marsabit | Naomi Waqo | UDA |
| 11 | Isiolo | Mumina Gollo Bonaya | Jubilee Party |
| 12 | Meru | Elizabeth Kailemia Karambu | UDA |
| 13 | Tharaka Nithi | Susan Ngugi | TSP |
| 14 | Embu | Pamela Njeru | UDA |
| 15 | Kitui | Irene Kasalu | Wiper |
| 16 | Machakos | Joyce Kamene Kasimbi | Wiper |
| 17 | Makueni | Rose Museo | Wiper |
| 18 | Nyandarua | Faith Gitau | UDA |
| 19 | Nyeri | Rahab Mukami | UDA |
| 20 | Kirinyaga | Jane Njeri Maina | UDA |
| 21 | Murang'a | Betty Maina | UDA |
| 22 | Kiambu | Anne Wamuratha | UDA |
| 23 | Turkana | Cecilia Asinyen | UDA |
| 24 | West Pokot | Rael Aleutum | KUP |
| 25 | Samburu | Pauline Lenguris | UDA |
| 26 | Trans-Nzoia | Lilian Siyoi | UDA |
| 27 | Uasin Gishu | Gladys Boss Shollei | UDA |
| 28 | Elgeyo-Marakwet | Caroline Jeptoo Ngelechei | Independent |
| 29 | Nandi | Cynthia Muge | UDA |
| 30 | Baringo | Florence Sergon | UDA |
| 31 | Laikipia | Jane Kagiri | UDA |
| 32 | Nakuru | Liza Chelule | UDA |
| 33 | Narok | Rebecca Tonkei | UDA |
| 34 | Kajiado | Leah Sopiato | UDA |
| 35 | Kericho | Beatrice Kemei | UDA |
| 36 | Bomet | Linet Toto | UDA |
| 37 | Kakamega | Elsie Muhanda | ODM |
| 38 | Vihiga | Beatrice Adagala | ANC |
| 39 | Bungoma | Catherine Wambilianga | FORD–Kenya |
| 40 | Busia | Catherine Omanyo | ODM |
| 41 | Siaya | Christine Ombaka | ODM |
| 42 | Kisumu | Ruth Odinga | ODM |
| 43 | Homa Bay | Joyce Osogo | ODM |
| 44 | Migori | Fatuma Mohamed | Independent |
| 45 | Kisii | Dorice Donya Aburi | Wiper |
| 46 | Nyamira | Jerusha Momanyi | Jubilee Party |
| 47 | Nairobi City | Esther Passaris | ODM |

== Senators ==
| Code | County | Name | Party |
|---|---|---|---|
| 1 | Mombasa | Mohamed Faki Mwinyihaji | ODM |
| 2 | Kwale | Issa Boy Juma | ODM |
| 3 | Kilifi | Stewart Madzayo | ODM |
| 4 | Tana River | Danson Mungatana | UDA |
| 5 | Lamu | Joseph Githuku | Jubilee Party |
| 6 | Taita-Taveta | Johnes Mwaruma | ODM |
| 7 | Garissa | Abdulkadir Haji | Jubilee Party |
| 8 | Wajir | Abbas Sheikh | UDM |
| 9 | Mandera | Ali Roba | UDM |
| 10 | Marsabit | Mohamed Chute | UDA |
| 11 | Isiolo | Fatuma Adan Dulo | Jubilee Party |
| 12 | Meru | Kathuri Murungi | UDA |
| 13 | Tharaka Nithi | Mwenda Gataya | UDA |
| 14 | Embu | Alexander Mundigi | DP |
| 15 | Kitui | Enoch Kiio Wambua | Wiper |
| 16 | Machakos | Agnes Kavindu | Wiper |
| 17 | Makueni | Daniel Maanzo | Wiper |
| 18 | Nyandarua | John Methu | UDA |
| 19 | Nyeri | Wahome Wamatinga | UDA |
| 20 | Kirinyaga | Kamau Murango | UDA |
| 21 | Murang'a | Joe Nyutu | UDA |
| 22 | Kiambu | Karungo Thang'wa | UDA |
| 23 | Turkana | James Lomenen Ekomwa | Upya Party |
| 24 | West Pokot | Julius Murgor | UDA |
| 25 | Samburu | Steve Lelegwe | UDA |
| 26 | Trans-Nzoia | Allan Chesang | UDA |
| 27 | Uasin Gishu | Jackson Mandago | UDA |
| 28 | Elgeyo-Marakwet | Kipchumba Murkomen | UDA |
| 29 | Nandi | Samson Cherargei | UDA |
| 30 | Baringo | William Cheptumo | UDA |
| 31 | Laikipia | John Kinyua | UDA |
| 32 | Nakuru | Tabitha Karanja | UDA |
| 33 | Narok | Ledama Olekina | ODM |
| 34 | Kajiado | Samuel Seki | UDA |
| 35 | Kericho | Aaron Cheruiyot | UDA |
| 36 | Bomet | Hillary Sigei | UDA |
| 37 | Kakamega | Boni Khalwale | UDA |
| 38 | Vihiga | Godfrey Osotsi | ODM |
| 39 | Bungoma | Moses Wetangula | FORD–Kenya |
| 40 | Busia | Okiya Omtatah | NRA |
| 41 | Siaya | Oburu Odinga | ODM |
| 42 | Kisumu | Tom Ojienda | ODM |
| 43 | Homa Bay | Moses Kajwang' | ODM |
| 44 | Migori | Eddy Oketch | ODM |
| 45 | Kisii | Richard Onyonka | ODM |
| 46 | Nyamira | Okong'o Omogeni | ODM |
| 47 | Nairobi City | Edwin Sifuna | ODM |

== See also ==
- Parliament of Kenya
