= Parliament of Kenya =

Bicameral legislature of Kenya

Parliament of Kenya Majilisi la Kenya (Swahili)
- 13th Parliament

Type
- Type: Bicameral
- Houses: Senate (upper house); National Assembly (lower house)

History
- Founded: 17 August 1906 (120 years ago)
- Preceded by: Legislative Council of Kenya
- New session started: 8 September 2022 (3 years ago)

Leadership
- Speaker of the Senate: Amason Kingi, Kenya Kwanza since 8 September 2022
- Speaker of the National Assembly: Moses Wetangula, Kenya Kwanza since 8 September 2022

Structure
- Seats: Senate: 67; National Assembly: 349
- Senate political groups: Government (66): Kenya Kwanza (33); Azimio la Umoja (30); Vacant (1): Vacant (1)
- National Assembly political groups: Government (337): Kenya Kwanza (179); UDA (143); ANC (7); FORD–K (6); TSP (2); CCK (1); DP (1); GDDP (1); PAA (3); UDM (5); MCC (2); UPIA (2); UPA (2); MDG (1); Azimio la Umoja (158); ODM (89); Jubilee (30); WPF (26); DAP (5); KANU (5); KUP (3); NOPEU (1); NAP (1); UDP (1); Independents (12): Independents (12)
- Length of term: 5 years, renewable
- Authority: Constitution of Kenya

Elections
- Senate voting system: First-past-the-post
- National Assembly voting system: First-past-the-post
- Last general election: 9 August 2022
- Next general election: On or before 10 August 2027
- Redistricting: Independent Electoral and Boundaries Commission

Motto
- For the Welfare of Society and the Just Government of the People

Meeting place
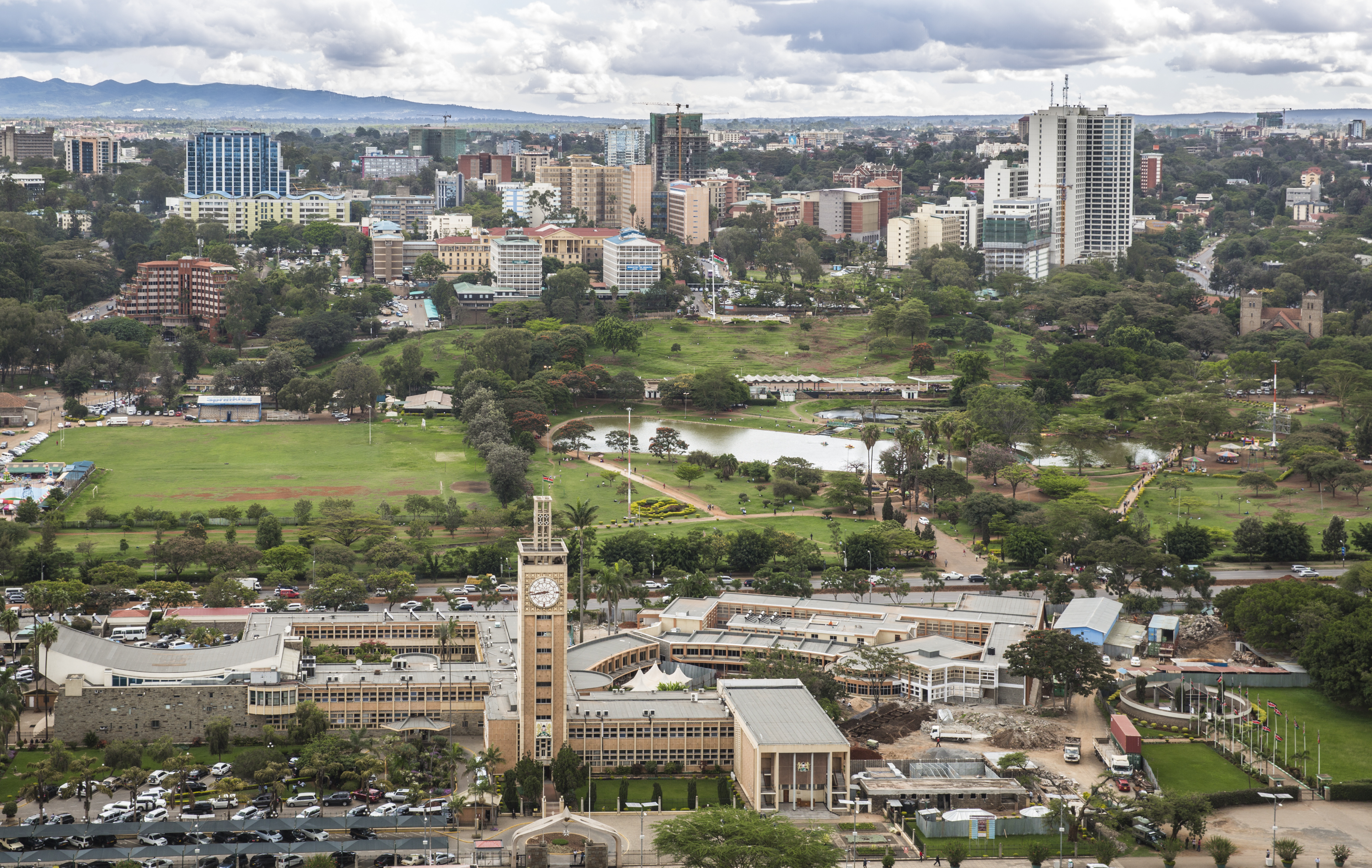
- Parliament Buildings; 1°17′24″S 36°49′12″E; Nairobi, Kenya

Website
- www.parliament.go.ke

Constitution
- Constitution of Kenya

The Parliament of Kenya (Swahili: Majilisi la Kenya) is the bicameral legislature of Kenya. It is based at Parliament Buildings in Nairobi and consists of two houses. The upper house is the Senate, and the lower house is the National Assembly.

Kenya’s current structure of parliament is a result of the creation and ratification of the Constitution of 2010 after widespread turmoil following the 2007 elections. This amendment created 47 counties and gave them significant powers, effectively working to decentralize the government. It also established the bicameral legislature of an assembly and a senate, which was first used in the 2013 elections. The Senate has 68 members including one elected from each county (of which there are 47), 16 female senators who are nominated by political parties, 4 members to represent those with disabilities and the youth, and a Speaker who is also nominated. The second legislative body is the National Assembly, which totals 350 members. This includes 290 Members of Parliament (MPs), 47 women who are each elected from a county, 12 members nominated by political parties to represent special interests like those of disabled people and youth, and a Speaker.

== History ==
Kenya, at the time known as the East Africa Protectorate, first established a legislative body, called the Legislative Council, in 1906 while still under British colonial rule. This council first met in 1907 and its main purpose was to secure benefits for white settlers while working against the interests of the many non-Europeans within the Protectorate. The seven member council was headed by the Governor and also included four civil servants and two individuals that the Governor appointed.

In 1919, an amendment was passed that added 11 members to the Council that were to be elected, but only those of European origin were permitted to vote or run for these seats. In 1924, another significant amendment was passed that gave the right to vote to those of Arab and Indian descent, and enumerated the creation of five seats for Indian council members and one seat for an Arab council member.

Eliud Mathu was the first African elected to the council in 1944, and by 1948, 4 African members held seats. Substantial change came in 1954 with the introduction of the Lyttleton Constitution which created a council of ministers, and the council was expanded in 1958.

In 1963, the Lancaster Parliament came into session which replaced the legislative council with a bicameral legislature called The National Assembly. This National Assembly consisted of a senate and house of representatives. There were 41 Senators, 40 from administrative districts and one from Nairobi, and 117 House Representatives elected by constituencies. This arrangement lasted until 1966, at which point the Senate was abolished and Kenya once again had a unicameral legislature. This was done through a constitutional amendment proposed in 1965.

This unicameral legislature, known as the National Assembly, stood as the sole legislative body until 2013. The 2013 elections were the first held under the 2010 Constitution, which recreated the Senate and county assemblies. The time between 1966 and 2010 saw significant changes in Kenyan politics, including the Constitution of Kenya Act of 1982. This act amended the Constitution of Kenya and made the country a de jure one-party state under the rule of the Kenya African National Union party. This amendment was then revoked in 1991. The country has functioned under a multi-party system since the 1992 elections.

== Rules and Restrictions for the Legislature ==
These national legislatures focus generally on national-level issues while county legislatures are free to craft laws regarding issues specific to their areas. The Parliament typically focuses on issues immigration, education, labor laws, and transportation. This is outlined in the 4th schedule of the 2010 Constitution. The National Assembly focuses on economic policy as they hold the power of the purse, and it also can commence the impeachment process against the President and other officials. The Kenyan Senate's role is more limited, with focus on legislation that impacts county governments. It is only involved in voting for impeachment proceedings that are initiated in the National Assembly.

Both the National Assembly and Senate possess the power to form committees. The National Assembly currently has over 40 committees addressing a wide range of issues from sports and culture to health, lands, or defense. Committees hold public meetings and are meant to serve in part as a forum for public opinion and feedback. This is in addition to the most notable and widely used mechanism of voicing opinions, which is through voting.

The minimum age to run for Parliament is 18, which is also the voting age. This restriction is the same for both the Assembly and the Senate. Members are elected to 5 year terms for both legislatures, although an amendment proposed in 2024 would have expanded terms to 7 years. Elections are held every 5 years in August, on the second Tuesday of the month.

Other election restrictions are enumerated in the Constitution and are enforced by the Independent Electoral and Boundaries Commission. This commission was formed to officiate and conduct all elections in Kenya. It is how candidates register to run for office and is meant to be a neutral party to ensure fair elections.

== Political parties ==
Kenya in 2013 had approximately 60 nationally registered parties. Generally, around 20 parties have elected representatives across the National Assembly and the Senate. There are currently 2 major coalitions. In the most recent general elections, held in 2022, the major coalitions were Azimio la Umoja and Kenya Kwanza. Kenya Kwanza is the coalition of the current president, William Ruto. Generally politics, and therefore political parties, in Kenya are influenced by and associated with various ethnic groups and political parties often play into ethnic ties to garner support. Although some politicians have tried to gain favor by invoking other identities, like gender and religion, ethnicity has the strongest grasp on party divisions. Some believe this has led to campaigns becoming personal contests.

The most popular party by current representation across Parliament is the United Democratic Alliance, or UDA. They currently hold 22 of 47 elected Senate seats and 138 elected National Assembly seats. They are a part of the Kenya Kwanza coalition and therefore are affiliated with president William Ruto. The party also has ties to the Kalenjin ethnic group.

The second most popular party in the 2022 elections, the Orange Democratic Movement, earned 13 of 47 elected Senate seats and 87 of the elected members of the National Assembly. The Orange Democratic Movement is part of the Azimio la Umoja coalition and had backed Raila Odinga in his candidacy for the presidency in 2022. The party is considered to be center-left and is associated with the Luo ethnic group.

The third-most popular party by Parliament seats is the Jubilee Party, who hold 29 elected National Assembly seats and 3 elected senate seats. They are part of the Azimio la Umoja coalition along with the Orange Democratic Movement. They are considered a center-right party and draw much of their support from the Kalenjin and Kikuyu ethnic groups. While there are over 70 distinct ethnic groups in Kenya, since independence, Kenya's presidents have only been of Kalenjin or Kikuyu ethnic origin.

== See also ==
- Politics of Kenya
- List of legislatures by country
- Legislative branch
