= Rahab Mukami =

Kenyan politician

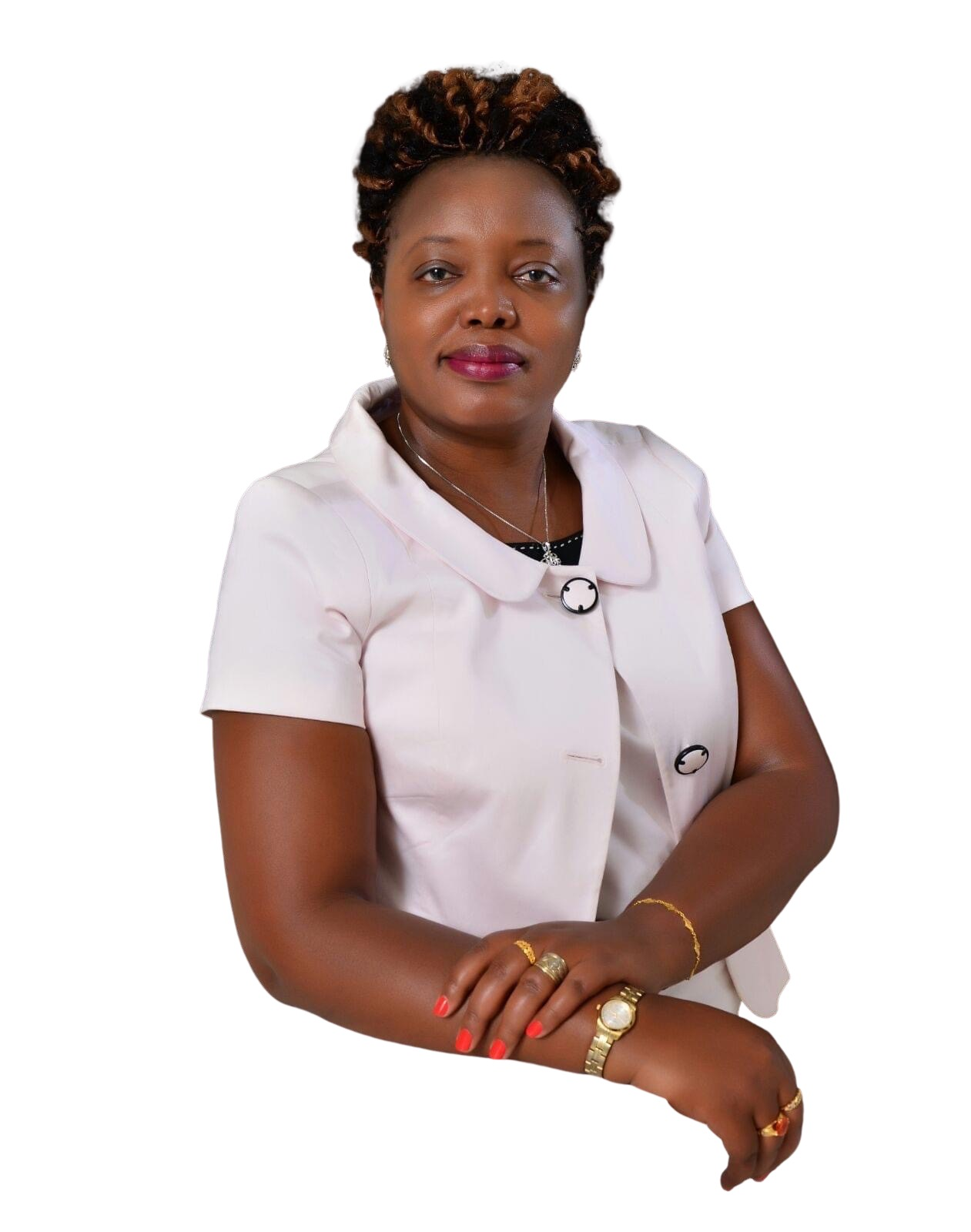
Hon Rahab Mukami Wachira, The Nyeri County Member of Parliament

Rahab Mukami Wachira (born c. 1974) is a Kenyan politician who currently serves as the Woman Representative for Nyeri County in the National Assembly of Kenya. She sits in the Committee on Appointments, National Cohesion and Equal opportunity Committee and the Departmental Committee on Labour, in the 13th Parliament. She is a member of the Pan African Parliament. She was first elected to Parliament in 2017 and re-elected in 2022 on the ticket of the United Democratic Alliance (UDA), a party affiliated with the Kenya Kwanza coalition.

== Early life and education ==
Mukami holds a Bachelor of Arts degree in Leadership and Management from St. Paul’s University (2013–2021). She also completed a certificate program in Emerging Economies at Harvard Business School in 2020.

== Career ==
Before entering politics, Mukami served as the Director at Ramaca Investment Limited, where she worked from 2004 to 2016.

Mukami was elected Women Representative for Nyeri County in the 2017 general election and retained her seat in 2022 with 87.98% of the vote, making her one of the most popularly elected women leaders in the country.

== Legislative work and initiatives ==
As a Member of Parliament, Mukami has focused on grassroots development under the banner of “Mukami Maendeleo Mashinani”. Her key areas of focus include:

- Education support: Provision of bursaries to financially disadvantaged students at the secondary and tertiary levels.
- Economic empowerment: Distribution of tools and equipment to women, youth, and people with disabilities to promote self-employment.
- Housing support: Construction of houses for vulnerable families across Nyeri County.
- School infrastructure: Rehabilitation of sanitation facilities in public schools.
- Food programs: Implementation of lunch programs to improve school attendance among disadvantaged children.

== Public engagement and advocacy ==
Mukami has advocated for issue-based politics and condemned incitement and divisive rhetoric. She encourages youth and fellow politicians to prioritize development and unity.

In 2023, she garnered national attention for supporting the education of Grace Nyakinyua Njeri, a student who had gone viral on social media after an appeal for school fees.

== Personal life ==
Mukami resides in Nyeri County and continues to support community-based initiatives benefiting marginalized populations.

== See also ==
- Parliament of Kenya
- Nyeri County
