= 2013 Kilifi local elections =

2013 Kenyan county elections in Kilifi County

Local elections were held in Kilifi County to elect a Governor and County Assembly on 4 March 2013. Under the new constitution, which was passed in a 2010 referendum, the 2013 general elections were the first in which Governors and members of the County Assemblies for the newly created counties were elected.

== Gubernatorial election ==
Amason Jeffa Kingi of the Orange Democratic Movement was elected governor of Kilifi County, receiving 94,868 votes. Independent candidate Lenno Mwambura Mbaga received 3,803 votes, and the county recorded 214,361 valid votes.

Candidate	Running Mate	Coalition	Party	Votes
Bayah, Francis	Amir, Abdulhakim		United Republican Party	--
Gona, Gabriel Katana	Said, Abdul Rahaman		KADU-ASILI	--
Katsoleh, Geoffrey Charo Kahindi	Chitavi, Patrick Fafali		Shirikisho Party of Kenya	--
Kazungu, Anthony Kingi	Dzombo, George Ngamba		Republican Congress Party	--
Kingi, Amason Jeffa	Kamto, Kenneth Mwakombo		Orange Democratic Movement	94,868
Lenga, John Mwapahe	Abubakar, Seif Athman		Chama Cha Uzalendo	--
Mbaga, Lenno Mwambura	Mrabu, Eunice Tumaini		Independent	3,803
Mumba, John Safari	Kalama, Leonard Jefa		Party of Independent Candidates of Kenya	--
Tinga, Michael Jefwa	Kitsao, Harrison Kalume	Jubilee	The National Alliance	--

== Aftermath ==
In August 2013, the Malindi High Court upheld Kingi's election as Kilifi governor, dismissing two petitions filed against him.
