= Edo Udgoon Siyad =

Kenyan politician

Edo Udgoon Siyad Kuno
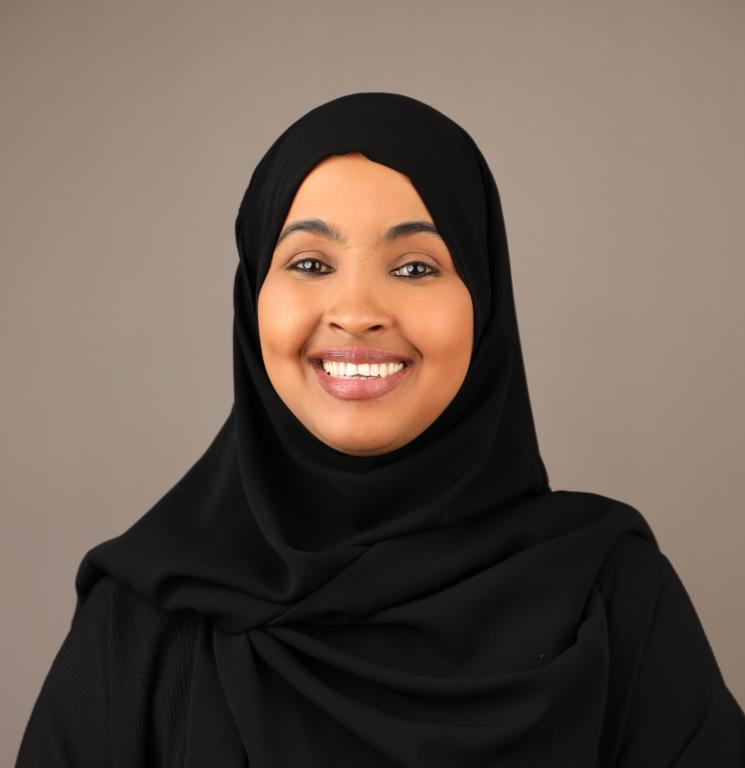
- Official 2022 portrait

Woman Representative for Garissa County
- Incumbent
- Assumed office 9 August 2022
- Preceded by: Anab Mohamed Gure

Personal details
- Party: Jubilee Party
- Education: Kenya Methodist University

Edo Udgoon Siyad is a Kenyan politician who is currently a member of the Kenya National Assembly as the woman representative for Garissa. She is a member of the Jubilee Party. She underwent controversy in June 2026 after allegations came out of an improper relationship between Udgoon and a sugar company.
