= Naomi Waqo =

Kenyan politician

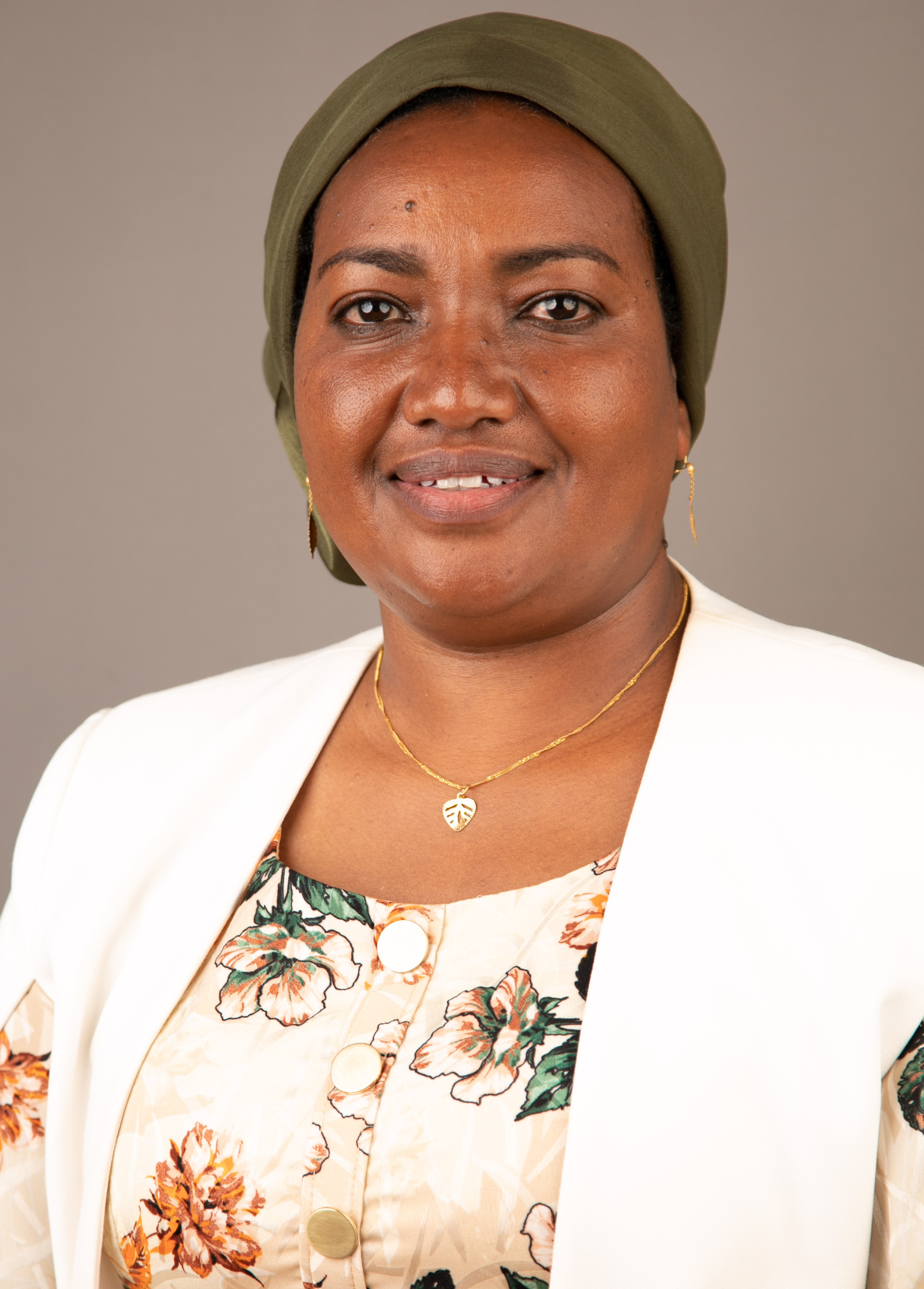

Women Representative for Marsabit County
- Incumbent
- Assumed office 16 August 2022
- Preceded by: Safia Sheikh Adan

Personal details
- Party: UDA
- Spouse: William Waqo d. 2006
- Education: St. Paul's University, University of Oslo, University of Wales

Naomi Jillo Waqo is a Kenyan politician who is currently a member of the Kenya National Assembly as the woman representative for Marsabit. She is a member of the UDA. She previously worked for the Parliamentary Service Commission from 2017 to 2022 and before that worked for some time in the Anglican Church of Kenya. She has declared interest in running for Marsabit county governor in 2027. Her husband, an Anglican bishop, died in a plane crash in 2006. In the National Assembly, she became Deputy Majority Whip.

== See also ==
- 13th Parliament of Kenya
