= Kabondo Kasipul Constituency =

Kenyan electoral constituency

Kabondo Kasipul
- constituency for the Parliament of Kenya
- County: Homa Bay

Current constituency
- Created: 2013
- Number of members: One
- Party: Orange Democratic Movement
- Member of Parliament: Eve Akinyi Obara
- Created from: Kasipul Kabondo

Kabondo Kasipul is a constituency in Kenya. It is one of eight constituencies in Homa Bay County.

== Members of Parliament ==
Elections	Member of Parliament	Party	Notes
2013	Silvance Osele	ODM	
2017	Eve Obara	ODM	
2022	Eve Obara	ODM	
