= Navakholo Constituency =

Electoral constituency in Kenya

Navakholo
- constituency for the Parliament of Kenya
- Navakholo Constituency within Kakamega County

- Kakamega County within Kenya
- County: Kakamega
- Population: 153,977
- Area: 259 km^{2} (100.0 sq mi)

Current constituency
- Number of members: 1
- Party: ODM
- Member of Parliament: Emmanuel Wangwe
- Wards: 5

Navakholo is a constituency in Kenya. It is one of twelve constituencies in Kakamega County. The Luhya subtribes found in Navakholo sub-county are Banyala ba Ndombi, Kabras and Batsotso. The major cash crop in Navakholo is sugarcane, with maize as the main food crop grown on small-scale farms. The mode of transport is by road (rough roads) that link the area with Mumias via shianda to the west, Malava to the east, Bungoma to the North, and Kakamega Town to the South. Due to the poor state of roads, most of people opt to use motorbikes (boda-bodas) as the roads are mostly impassable during rainy seasons. This is because there are no bitumen roads in the area. Secondary schools found in Navakholo constituency are Namirama Girls, Chebuyusi Boys, Ingotse Boys, St Paul's Emulakha, Navakholo Secondary, Friends School Sidikho, Sivilie Secondary, Friends school Simuli Secondary, among others. Some of the primary schools in the area are Mukangu Primary, Lwakhupa Primary, Simuli Primary, Siyenga Primary, Nambacha Primary, Chebuyusi Friends Primary School(in Naulu), Musaga Primary, Nderema Primary, Makhima Primary, Emuhuni Primary, Siyombe Primary, Tomliza Academy, Bright Academy, among others. The area has produced football teams, among them are Simuli FC,Nambacha FC, Musaga FC, Forest FC, etc.

Navakholo constituency comprises five county assembly wards;

1. Bunyala West
2. Bunyala Central
3. Bunyala East
4. Shinoyi-shikomari-esumeiya
5. Ingotse-matiha

== Parliamentary representation ==
Navakholo Constituency was established in 2012 by the Independent Electoral and Boundaries Commission (IEBC) as one of the new constituencies created under the 2010 Constitution of Kenya. The first election for the seat was held in 2013.

The constituency has been represented by a single Member of Parliament since its creation:

Parliament	Years	Member	Party	Notes
11th	2013–2017	Emmanuel Wangwe	UDF (2013); Jubilee Party (aligned)	First election; multi-party system under new constitution
12th	2017–2022	Emmanuel Wangwe	Jubilee Party	Re-elected
13th	2022–present	Emmanuel Wangwe	Orange Democratic Movement	Re-elected
