= Silvanus Osoro =

Kenyan politician (born 1987)

The Honourable Sivanus Osoro

Member of Parliament for South Mugirango Constituency
- In office 2017 – 8 September 2022
- Preceded by: Manson Nyamwea
- Constituency: South Mugirango
- Incumbent
- Assumed office 8 September 2022

Personal details
- Born: Silvanus Osoro Onyiego; 21 December 1987 (age 38) Kisii, Kenya
- Citizenship: Kenya
- Party: United Democratic Alliance
- Other political affiliations: Kenya National Congress
- Spouse: Stela Osoro (m. 2009)
- Children: 7
- Parents: Meshack Onyiego; Sarah Kemunto
- Education: Mount Kenya University, Bachelor of Laws
- Occupation: Politician
- Profession: Businessman

Silvanus Osoro Onyiengo (born 21 December, 1987) is a Kenyan politician and current member of parliament for South Mugirango Constituency. He is the Majority Party Whip of the National Assembly. He contested for the seat during the 2022 general elections under the United Democratic Alliance party ticket, getting elected with 25,152 votes against ODM's Dennis Sonko with 21,710 votes, UPA's Daniel Apepo with 1,213 votes and KNC's Willis Omwoyo, who had 1,100 votes. He is the founder and owner of Pitchface Marketing Limited. Osoro was a member of the 12th Parliament representing South Mugirango Constituency after being elected on a KNC party ticket.

== Early life and education ==
Osoro was born on 21 December 1987 in Kisii County as the fifth born in a family of six siblings. His father, Meshack Onyiengo, was a secondary school teacher and his mother, Sarah Kemunto, worked as a nurse at Kaplong Hospital in Bomet County. His primary education was at Chemasingi Primary School in Kimulot, Bomet County, from 1995 to 2002, where he attained his Kenya Certificate of Primary Education. For his secondary education, Osoro started at Kamungei Secondary School at the start of 2003 before joining St Joseph's Nyabigena Secondary School in Kisii County and finally joined Hill Secondary School for his Kenya Certificate of Secondary Education in 2006.

He started pursuing a Bachelor of Education at Kenyatta University before pivoting to focus on commerce, attaining CPA I and II certificates. In 2014, Osoro enrolled for a Bachelor of Laws at Mount Kenya University and graduated in 2017.

== Career ==
Osoro started as a trader in Nairobi selling newspapers in the streets of the Central Business District, then went on to sell second-hand clothes at Gikomba Market.

He registered a company by the name Pitch Face Group Limited in 2012. The company is now involved in sales and marketing across East Africa.

=== Political career ===
His first appearance in politics was during the 2017 general elections, winning the South Mugirango parliamentary seat with a party ticket of the Kenya National Congress. Osoro was elected with 11,168 votes against Makori Denis Magare of the Restore and Build Kenya party, who had 10,424 votes, Peoples Democratic Party's Bichang'a Samson with 7,074 votes, while Marube Vincent of Jubilee managed to get 6,458 votes. During his period at the 12th parliament, he served as a committee member of the Departmental Committee on Defence and Foreign Relations and of the Departmental Committee on Agriculture, Livestock and Co-Operatives and Committee on Implementation.

Osoro contested for the South Mugirango Constituency parliamentary seat for the second term under the United Democratic Alliance party. He managed to garner 25,152 votes, winning with a margin of 6.61 per cent to second-place Dennis Sonko, who was contesting as the Orange Democratic Movement candidate. Dennis Sonko had 21,710 votes, in third place we had United Progressive Alliance candidate Daniel Apepo with 1,213 votes, who was followed by Willis Omwoyo with the Kenya National Congress party ticket with 1,100 votes. He is serving as a member of the Constitutional Implementation Oversight Committee, the Departmental Committee Justice and Legal Affairs and the House Business Committee. On 6th October 22, the National Assembly elected him as the Majority Party Whip.

== Awards ==
On 12 December 2022, during the 59th Jahuri Day celebrations at Nyayo Stadium, President William Ruto awarded Osoro the Chief of the Order of the Burning Spear (CBS), among thirty-three others.

== Personal life ==
Osoro has been married to Stela Osoro since 2009 and together they have five children. In total, he has 7 children.

== See also ==
- 13th Parliament of Kenya
- 12th Parliament of Kenya
- South Mugirango Costituency
- United Democratic Alliance
- Kenya National Congress
