= Charles Kamuren =

Kenyan politician

Charles Kamuren MP

Member of Parliament for Baringo South
- Incumbent
- Assumed office 28 August 2018
- Preceded by: Grace Kipchoim

Personal details
- Party: United Democratic Alliance

Charles Kamuren is a Kenyan politician who is currently a member of the National Assembly for the Baringo South Constituency representing the United Democratic Alliance.

== Biography ==
Kamuren graduated from Loboi Primary School in 1983 and Ng'ambo Secondary School in 1987. He earned a Teachers certificate from Thogoto Teachers College in 1991 and a Diploma in Control and Management of HIV from Kenyatta University in 2002. He earned his Bachelor of Arts in Leadership and Management from St. Paul's University in 2016.
