= Amina Dika Abdullahi =

Kenyan Politician

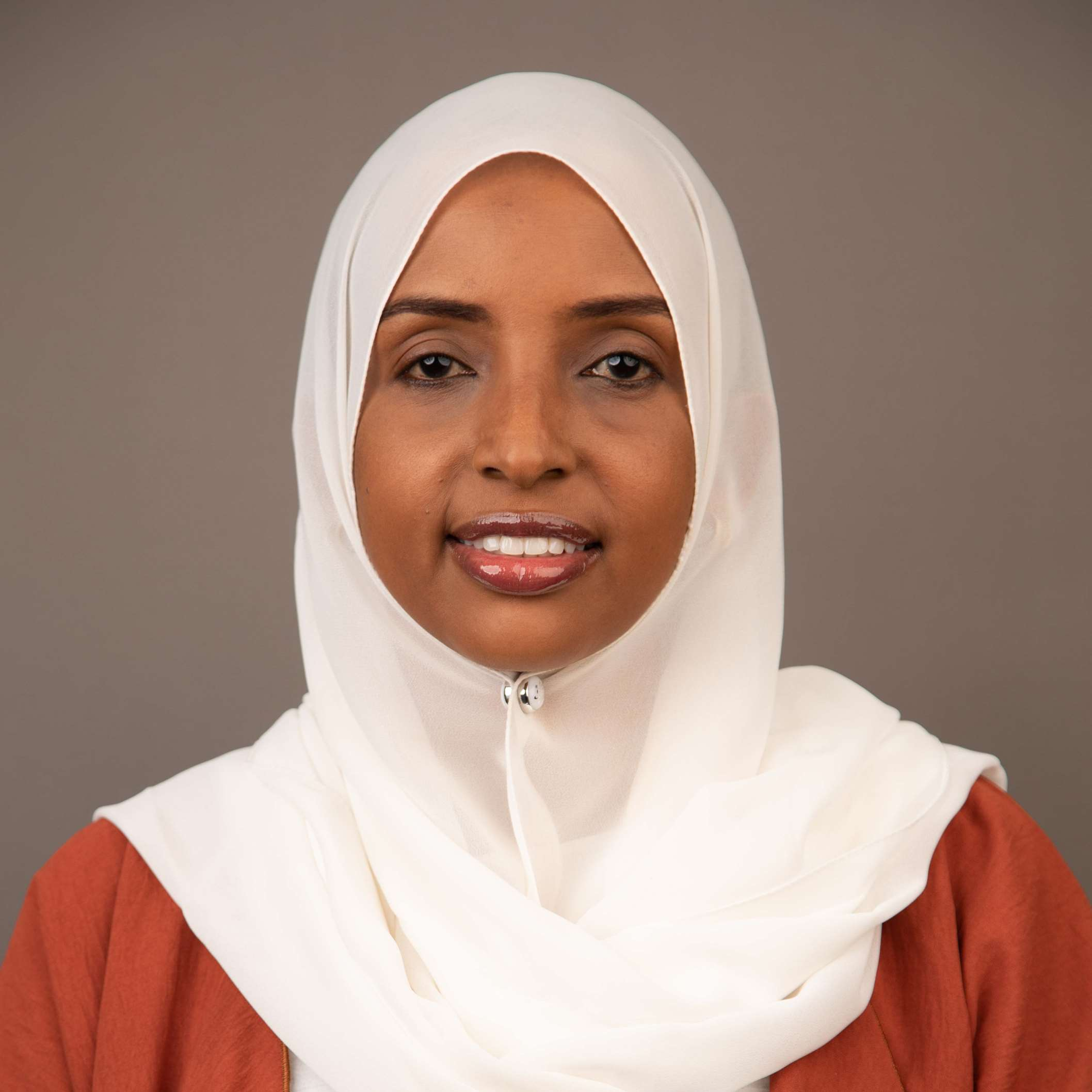

Woman Representative for Tana River County
- Incumbent
- Assumed office 16 August 2022
- Preceded by: Rehema Hassan

Personal details
- Party: KANU

Amina Dika Abdullahi is a Kenyan Politician from Tana River county and a member of the National Assembly of Kenya. Amina is the Women Representative of Tana River County. She was elected in the 2022 Kenya general election through the Kenya African National Union Party under the coalition of AZIMIO LA UMOJA Party.

== Education and career ==
She has a Diploma from the Institute of Commercial Management from 2002 to 2003. In between 2005 and 2015 she pursued Certificate in Sales & Marketing at the Marriott Learning Center. She also has a Degree in Business Management Sales & Marketing from the East African University.

Amina was the Nominee of the Ritz-Carlton awards in both 2012 and 2016 Quarters.

From 2008 to 2011, She was a Sales Executive at the Dusit Marina/Princess. She was also a Sales Executive for four years at the Ritz-Carlton, from 2011 to 2014. An Assistan Sales Manager at the Ritz-Carlton from 2014 to 2015. Amina was promoted to be a Group Sales Manager at the Ritz-Carlton in 2015. And in 2020 she was the Operations Manager at the Samua Medicals till 2021.
