= Dorice Donya Aburi =

Kenyan politician

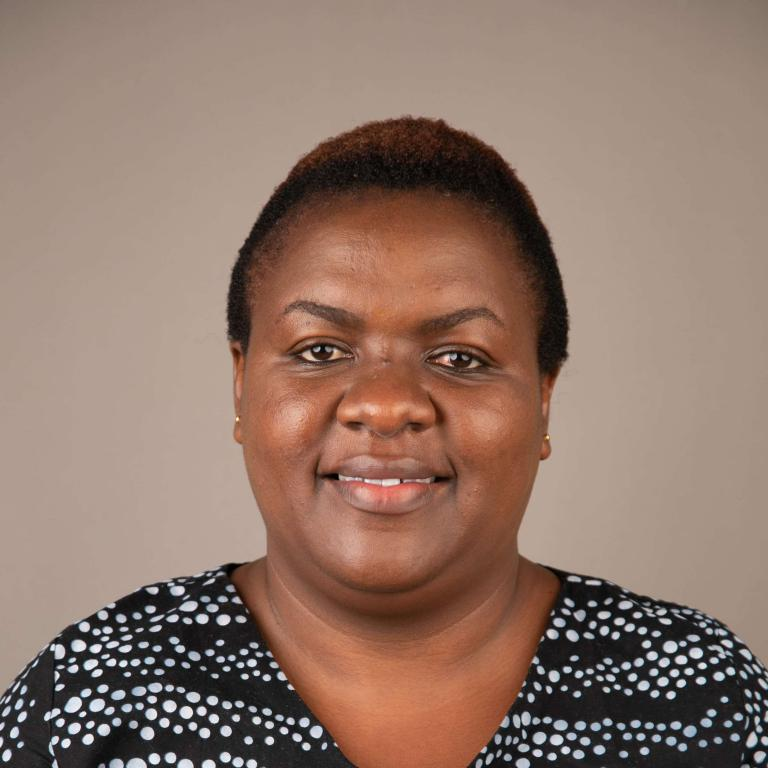

Women Representative for Kisii County
- Incumbent
- Assumed office 2022

Personal details
- Party: Wiper Democratic Movement – Kenya

Dorice Donya Aburi is a Kenyan politician. She is a member of the Wiper Democratic Movement – Kenya party.

== Early life ==
Aburi was born in Ichuni Ward, Kisii County.

== Political career ==
She left her career as a radio host to stand as a candidate in the 2017 general election but was not elected. She was elected as women's representative in the National Assembly from Kisii County in the 2022 Kenyan general election. She is an advocate against gender-based violence.

== Personal life ==
Aburi and her husband have two children.

== See also ==
- 13th Parliament of Kenya
