= Rose Museo Mumo =

Kenyan politician

Hon Rose Museo Mumo

Woman Representative
- In office 2013–2017
- Constituency: Makueni County

Woman Representative
- In office 2017–2022

Woman Representative
- In office 2022–2027

Personal details
- Born: Rose Museo Makueni County Kenya
- Education: Kenya Methodist University Africa Regional Counselling and Training Institute
- Profession: Politician
- Awards: First Class Chief of the Order of the Burning Spear

Rose Museo Mumo is a Kenyan politician serving as the Woman Representative for Makueni County in the National Assembly of Kenya. She was first elected in the 2013 Kenya General Election under the Wiper Democratic Movement and has subsequently been re-elected in 2017 and 2022.

== Early life and education ==
Mumo was born in Makueni County,Kenya. She attended Mary Cliff Primary School in Mombasa before joining H.H Aga Khan High School for her secondary education. She later studied at Southon's Secretarial College and obtained a Diploma in Social Work and Community Development from the Africa Regional Counselling and Training Institute. She also earned a Bachelor of Arts degree in Counselling Psychology from Kenya Methodist University.

== Career ==
Before entering politics, Mumo worked as a Programme Officer at Action Aid Kenya. She later served as an administrator at the Makueni Paralegal Coordinating Agency (MAPACA) and as a director in the Children and Women's department of the Seventh Day Adventist Church in the Central Kenya Conference.

== Political career ==
Mumo was elected Woman Representative for Makueni County in the 2013 general election on a Wiper Democratic Movement ticket. She was re-elected in subsequent elections, in the 2017 and 2022 general elections, serving in the 11th, 12th and 13th Parliaments of Kenya.

During her parliamentary career, she has served on several committees of the National Assembly, including committees dealing with labor and social welfare, national cohesion, implementation and health club.

== Public image and advocacy ==
In 2007, Mumo was involved in a road accident that resulted in a broken leg and led to her disability. In media interviews, she has spoken publicly about disability inclusion and social welfare issues.

Mumo has represented Kenya in East African Community (EAC) Inter-Parliamentary Games for persons with disabilities, where she competed in darts competitions in South Sudan and Rwanda.

== Recognition ==
In December 2024, Mumo, was among Kenyan public officials awarded the First Class Chief of the Order of the Burning Spear (C.B.S) by President William Ruto.
