= Linet Toto =

Kenyan politician

Honourable Linet Toto Chepkorir

County Woman Representative of Bomet County
- Incumbent
- Assumed office 8 September 2022
- Preceded by: Joyce Chepkoech Korir

Personal details
- Born: Linet Chepkorir; 19 April 1997 (age 29) Chemomul, Bomet County, Kenya
- Party: United Democratic Alliance
- Education: Bachelor's Degree in Procurement
- Alma mater: Tharaka Nithi University
- Occupation: Politician
- Nickname: Linet Toto

Linet Chepkorir Toto (born 1997) is a Kenyan politician and member of the UDA party. Following the general election on 9 August 2022, Toto is presumed to be the youngest woman to be elected to the National Assembly as the Woman County Representative for Bomet County.

== Early life ==
Linet Chepkorir, popularly known as Toto, was the third born child to Leonard Lang’at and Betty Lang’at in Chemomul, Bomet County. She went to Kapsimbiri Elementary School, where she sat for her KCPE and later on joined Kapsimbiri Secondary School before transferring to Siwot Secondary for her secondary education. She graduated from Tharaka University in April 2021.

== Political career ==
Linet was elected woman representative in the National Assembly for Bomet County in the 2022 general election. She won 242,775 votes. She is presumed to be the youngest member of the 13th Parliament of Kenya.

== Legal issues ==
In August 2023,, Linet Toto was sued by a former staff member in her office for alleged wrongful dismissal from service.

== Personal life ==
On 14 February 2023, she was engaged to be married. She married her fiancé Godfrey Kimutai on 4 March in a traditional Kalenjin Koito ceremony.

== See also ==
- 13th Parliament of Kenya
