= James Omingo Magara =

Kenyan politician

James Omingo Magara (born 20 September 1961) is a Kenyan politician. He is the Party Leader of People's Democratic Party (PDP) and was the MP for South Mugirango Constituency in the National Assembly of Kenya from the year 2000 – 2009. He first won the seat in the by-elections in 2001 on Ford-Kenya ticket, replacing his brother Enoch Nyakieya Magara of Ford-Kenya, who had died in a car accident. He retained the seat at the 2002 elections, but now representing Ford-People, and in the 2007 elections representing ODM. He was the assistant minister of trade until December 2009 the High court of Kenya declared the South Mugirango parliamentary seat vacant due to irregularities in the election process, although Magara himself was not found guilty of any rigging. Subsequent South Mugirango by-election was held in June 2010. Magara decamped to the little-known People's Democratic Party (PDP) after being denied ODM's nomination apparently because he had fallen out of favour with party leader Raila Odinga. The by-election was won by Manson Nyamweya of Ford-People, who beat Magara and Ibrahim Ochoi of ODM. In 2013, Omingo Magara Vied for Kisii Senatorial seat where he came far 3rd as Chris Obure worn in the fiercely contest elections
