= South Mugirango Constituency =

Kenyan electoral constituency

South Mugirango
- constituency for the Parliament of Kenya
- County: Kisii County

Current constituency
- Created: 1988
- Number of members: One
- Party: UDA
- Member of Parliament: Silvanus Osoro
- Created from: Wanjare–South Mugirango

South Mugirango is an electoral constituency in Kenya. It is one of nine constituencies in Kisii County. The constituency was established for the 1988 elections.

== Members of Parliament ==
Elections	MP	Party	Notes
1988	David Kombo	KANU	
1992	Reuben Oyondi	KANU	
1997	Enoch Nyakieya Magara	Ford-K	Magara died in a car accident in 2001
2001	James Omingo Magara	Ford-K	By-elections
2002	James Omingo Magara	Ford-People	
2007	James Omingo Magara	ODM	The High Court declared the seat vacant in December 2009 due to irregularities in the election
2010	Manson Nyamweya	Ford-People	By-election
2013	Manson Nyamweya	KNC	
2017	Silvanus Onyiego Osoro	KNC	
2022	Silvanus Onyiego Osoro	UDA	

== Etago and Gucha South Sub-counties ==
South Mugirango has two sub-counties within its boundaries: Etago and Gucha South. Each sub-county is headed by the Deputy County Commissioner under the Ministry of Interior and National Government.
