= Emmanuel Wangwe =

Kenyan politician

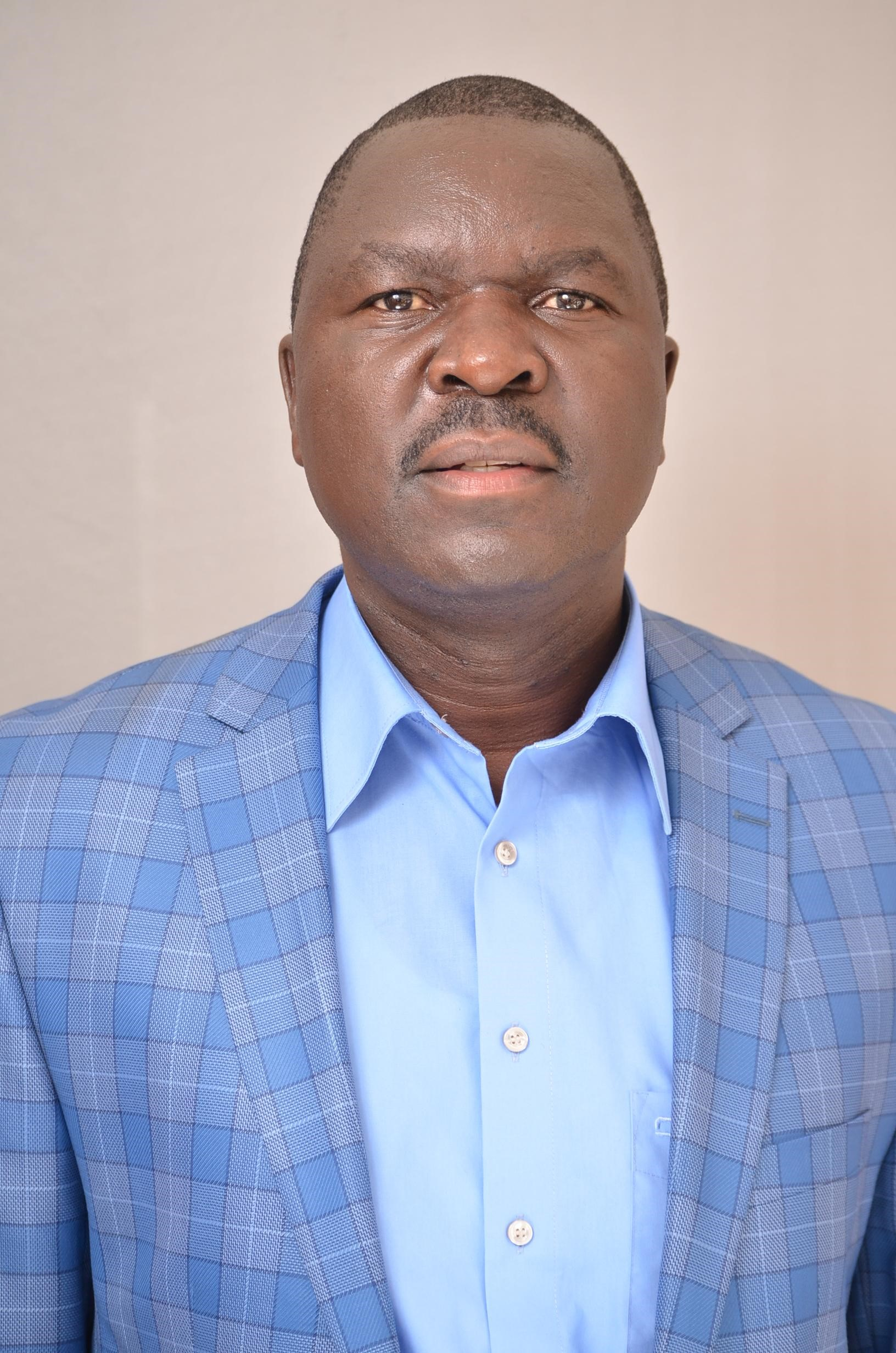
- HON. EMMANUEL WANGWE

Member of Parliament
- In office 4 March 2013 – Incumbent
- Constituency: Navakholo Constituency

Majority Whip, National Assembly
- In office June 2020 – 2022

Vice Chairperson, Agriculture and Livestock Committee
- In office 2017–2020

Chairperson, Public Investments Committee on Social Services, Administration and Agriculture
- In office 2025–Incumbent

Personal details
- Party: Orange Democratic Movement

== Political history ==
Emmanuel Wangwe entered elective politics in 2013, when he successfully contested the Navakholo Constituency parliamentary seat in the first general election held under Kenya's 2010 Constitution. His victory marked the beginning of his national legislative career.

During his first term (2013–2017), Wangwe served on parliamentary committees related to transport, public works, housing, urban development, and the National Government Constituencies Development Fund (NG-CDF). His election was challenged in court, but the result was upheld.

In the 2017 general election, Wangwe was re-elected as Member of Parliament for Navakholo Constituency. During his second term, he was appointed Vice Chairperson of the Agriculture and Livestock Committee.

In June 2020, he became the Majority Whip of the National Assembly, coordinating government legislative business and party voting strategy until 2022.

Following the 2022 general election, Wangwe retained his seat and now serves in the 13th Parliament under the Orange Democratic Movement. In 2025, he was appointed Chairperson of the Public Investments Committee on Social Services, Administration and Agriculture, overseeing state agencies within the committee's mandate.

Since 2013, Wangwe's political career has been characterised by electoral continuity, parliamentary leadership, and committee service, making him a long-serving legislator in Kenya's National Assembly.

== Election results ==
General election 2017: Navakholo
Party	Candidate	Votes	%
Jubilee	Emmanuel Wangwe	17,876	45.0
Maendeleo Democratic Party	Joseph Amisi Omukanda	9,882	24.9
Amani	Lawrence Simbauni Ndombi	5,265	13.3
Independent	Jacob Wasai Nanjakululu	2,336	5.9
ODM	Vance Paul Udoto	2,177	5.5
Independent	Dr-moni Wekesa	932	2.3
FORD-K	Leonard Mayende	665	1.7
United Democratic Party	Ladan Bitonye Wakhisi	339	0.9
Independent	Livingstone Wawire Karakacha	221	0.6
Majority		7,994	20.1
