= Kenya Union Party =

Political party in Kenya

- Abbreviation: KUP
- Founded: 2021
- Headquarters: Nairobi, Kenya
- National affiliation: Azimio la Umoja
- Colors: Blue
- National Assembly: 2 / 349
- Senate: 0 / 67

The Kenya Union Party (KUP) is a political party in Kenya.

== History ==
The party was founded in 2021 by then Governor of West Pokot County, John Krop Lonyangapuo and then Pokot South Constituency Member of Parliament, David Pkosing.

The party was one of 23 that contested the 2022 Kenyan general election as part of the Azimio La Umoja alliance. 3 were elected to the 13th Parliament of Kenya. After the election they dismissed claims of a change to Kenya Kwanza. On 27 April 2023, former Governor John Lonyang'apuo signed a post-election pre-coalition agreement to join Kenya Kwanza.

== Elected representatives ==
=== MPs ===
Constituency	MP
Kacheliba	Titus Lotee
Pokot South	David Pkosing
West Pokot	Rael Chepkemoi Aleutum

=== Governors ===
- John Krop Lonyangapuo

== See also ==
- List of political parties in Kenya
