= Fatuma Abdi Jehow =

Kenyan politician

Hon. Fatuma Abdi Jehow

Women Representative for Wajir County
- Incumbent
- Assumed office 2022
- Preceded by: Fatuma Gedi
- Constituency: Wajir County

Personal details
- Education: Bachelor of Information Technology; Master of Arts in Governance and Ethics
- Occupation: Politician
- Profession: ICT specialist
- Known for: Women Representative for Wajir County

Fatuma Abdi Jehow is a Kenyan politician from Wajir county. A member of the National Assembly of Kenya, she is the current women representative for Wajir county. She won the seat through the Orange Democratic Movement in the 2022 Kenya General Elections. It has been six months since Jehow gained the Women representative seat.

Jehow won the seat by 36,064 votes against eleven candidates competing for the same seat. Among those she defeated was the then incumbent women representative for Wajir County, Fatuma Gedi, who managed to get 22,956 votes.

== Career ==
Jehow studied Bachelor in Information Technology. She further studied Masters in Arts, Governance and Ethics. Jehow is interested in conflict resolution and community service. She was awarded the Best Relationship Officer Excellence by the Kenya Bankers Association. She has worked as an ICT Officer at the National Bank of Kenya. At Gulf African Bank, she worked as the Senior Relationship Officer. She also worked as a Private Consultant at the Ethics and Governance Consultancy Firm.
