= Joyce Kamene =

Kenyan Politician

Joyce Kamene Kasimbi

County Woman Representative

Hon
- In office August 2017 – 2022
- Constituency: Machakos County

County Woman Representative
- Incumbent
- Assumed office September 2022
- Constituency: Machakos County

Personal details
- Born: Joyce Kamene; 15 June 1978 (age 48)
- Party: Wiper Democratic Movement
- Education: University of Nairobi Alliance Française de Nairobi
- Occupation: Politician
- Committees: Departmental Committee on Agriculture and Livestock Special Funds Committee Catholic MPs’ Spiritual Support Initiative Committee

Joyce Kamene Kasimbi (born 15 June 1978) is a Kenyan politician serving as the Woman Representative for Machakos County, having been elected in 2017 and re-elected in 2022 under the Wiper Democratic Movement. She is a member of the National Assembly.

== Early life and education ==
Kasimbi obtained her Kenya Certificate of Secondary Education from Visa Oshwal Girls Secondary School. She later pursued an Accountants Clerk National Certificate at Universal College. She also holds an Advanced Certificate in French from Alliance Française de Nairobi and a Bachelor of Arts degree in Political Science, Philosophy, and Religious Studies from the University of Nairobi.

== Career ==
Prior to entering politics, Kasimbi worked in public service as a clerk at the Ministry of Information and Communication and later held a similar role at the Kenya Broadcasting Corporation. She later joined the private sector, serving as a director at Hill Farm Enterprises.

== Political career ==
Kasimbi was elected Woman Representative for Machakos County in 2017 and re-elected in 2022 under the Wiper Democratic Movement (WDM). In the 2022 election, she received 253,113 votes, defeating her closest opponent, Ritah Ndunda of the Maendeleo Chap Chap (MCC), who received 93,778 votes. She had previously contested the same position in 2013 but was unsuccessful.

During her tenure in the 12th Parliament, she served on the Agriculture and Livestock Committee and the Special Funds Committee, and was Vice Chairperson of the Catholic MPs' Spiritual Support Initiative. She currently serves on the Trade Committee of the National Assembly.

== Awards and recognition ==
Kasimbi was named the Eastern Region Best Performing Woman Representative at the County Gala Awards in 2021 and 2022.
