= Anab Mohamed Gure =

Kenyan Politician

Anab Mohamed Gure is a Kenyan politician and a former Women's Representative for Garissa country in the Kenya National Assembly from 31st August, 2017 to 2022. She previously served as a Research Assistant at the Kenya Bureau of Statistics and also a Civic Education Officer with the Independent Electoral and Boundaries Commission (IEBC).

== Education ==
Anab Gure graduated from East African University with a Bachelor degree in Business Management (Human Resource Option). She also holds a Diploma in Community Development and Counseling.

== Career ==
Anab served as the Women Representative for Garissa country in the National Assembly of Kenya from 31st August, 2017 to 2022. Before that, she served as a Research Assistant at the Kenya Bureau of Statistics and a Civic Education Officer with the Independent Electoral and Boundaries Commission (IEBC). In 2023, she was nominated for Chief Administrative Secretary. IN 2024, she was nominated as a member of the Nairobi Rivers Commission by the Kenya President, William Ruto.
