= Amason Kingi =

Kenyan politician

The Right Honourable Amason Kingi EGH
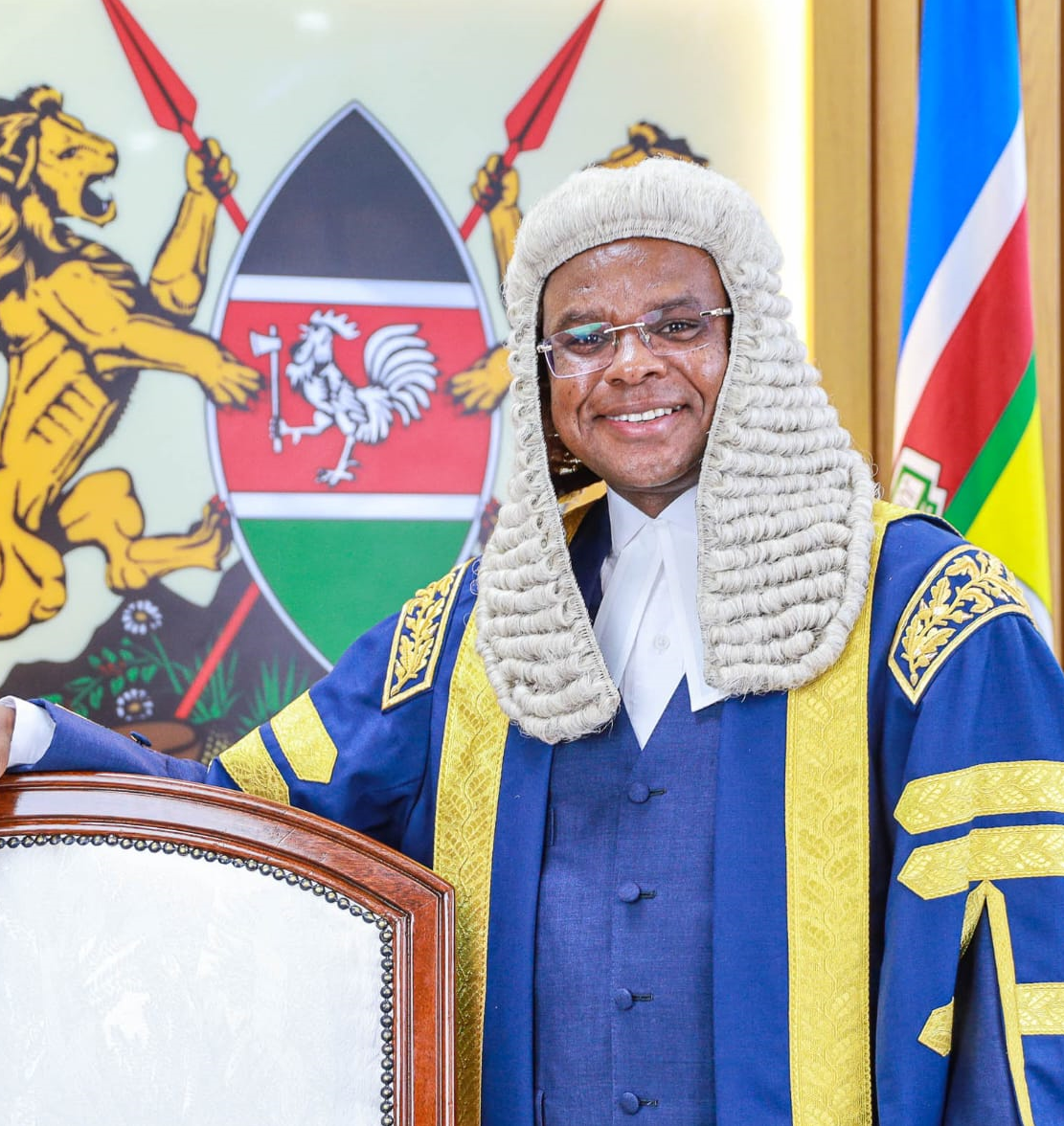

3rd Speaker of the Kenyan Senate
- Incumbent
- Assumed office 8 September 2022
- Preceded by: Kenneth Lusaka
- President: William Samoei Ruto

1st Governor of Kilifi County
- In office 27 March 2013 – 25 August 2022
- Preceded by: Position established
- Succeeded by: Gideon Mung'aro

Member of the Kenyan Parliament
- In office 2008–2013
- Succeeded by: Gideon Mung'aro
- Constituency: Magarini

Personal details
- Born: 1973 (age 52–53) Magarini Constituency
- Party: Pamoja African Alliance
- Other political affiliations: Kenya Kwanza
- Spouse: Liz Kingi
- Occupation: Politician

Amason Jeffah Kingi EGH (born 1973) is a Kenyan politician currently serving as the Speaker of the Senate of Kenya. He is a member and leader of the Pamoja African Alliance party, which he founded. The party is part of the Kenya Kwanza alliance. He served as the first governor of Kilifi County from 2013 to 2022, having been elected twice to the position.

He formed his own party, Pamoja African Alliance which later joined the United Democratic Alliance, FORD–Kenya, the Amani National Congress and other small parties to form the Kenya Kwanza alliance, which was elected into government in the 2022 Kenyan general election.

== Career ==
Kingi studied law and graduated from the University of Nairobi in 1998. As a member of the Orange Democratic Movement (ODM), he was elected to represent the Magarini Constituency in parliament during the 2007 Kenyan parliamentary election.

His growing reputation was spotted by president Mwai Kibaki and prime minister Raila Odinga, who gave him a position as Minister for the East African Community in the Grand Coalition government that was formed after the 2007 post-election violence. He served as Minister for Fisheries Development from 2010 to 2013.

Kingi ran for and won the governorship of Kilifi County in 2013, and he was reelected in 2017. He established the Pamoja African Alliance party in an effort to free coastal Kenya from ODM's control. This party originally aligned itself with Azimio la Umoja, which supported Raila Odinga for president, but severed relations with the group in 2022 and joined Kenya Kwanza, which supported William Ruto. Kenya Kwanza and Ruto won the 2022 elections, and Kingi was elected Speaker of the Senate.
