= Eve Akinyi Obara =

Kenyan politician

Parliament for Kabondo Kasipul Constituency
- Incumbent
- Assumed office 2022

Personal details
- Born: Eve Akinyi
- Party: Orange Democratic Movement
- Education: University of Nairobi (Bachelor of Arts in Sociology and Social Science) University of Illinois Masters in Business Administration,
- Occupation: Politician

Eve Akinyi Obara is a Kenyan politician and the current Member of Parliament for Kabondo Kasipul Constituency in Homabay County. She has been a member of the Orange Democratic Movement (ODM) since 2017.

== Education ==
Obara attended Loreto High School for her East African Certificate of Education (EACE) in 1972 and she went to Lwak Girls High School for her East African Advanced Certificate of Education (EAACA) in 1976. Between 1978 and 1981, she studied at University of Nairobi to earn a Diploma in Home Science Hotel and catering Management, and from 1990 to 1991 attended the University of Illinois to pursue a Bacholors Degree in Business Administration.

== Career ==
Obara was employed at the Ministry of Agriculture as a personnel officer from 1982 to 1984, and was later employed as Deputy Managing Director, Personnel and Admin Manager from 1995 to 2007 at the Kenya Literature Bureau.

== See also ==
- 13th Parliament of Kenya
