= Junet Mohamed =

Kenyan politician

Honorable Junet Mohamed
- Born: 1977 (age 48–49); Mandera, Kenya
- Citizenship: Kenyan
- Education: Lenana School; University of Nairobi; Woodvale Institute
- Occupation: Politician
- Office: Minority Leader in the Kenya National Assembly; Suna East Constituency Member of Parliament
- Political party: ODM
- Spouse: Khadija Faiza Jama

Junet Mohamed is a Kenyan politician from the Orange Democratic Movement (ODM). He is the minority leader in the National Assembly of the 13th Parliament of Kenya.

== Early life ==
Junet Mohamed was born on 25 October 1977 in Mandera District, Kenya. He grew up in a large family as the second-born among nine siblings. His father, Sheikh Nuh Mohamed, originally hailed from Mandera but later moved the family to South Nyanza to pursue a wholesale business. This relocation exposed Junet to diverse cultures and experiences, shaping his outlook and future endeavors.

== Education ==
Mohamed's educational journey began at Mandera D.E.B. Primary School, where he completed his primary education. He attended Lenana School, a prestigious secondary institution in Nairobi, for his high school studies. He pursued higher education at the University of Nairobi, earning a Bachelor of Business Administration degree. Additionally, he holds a Diploma in Business Management from the Woodvale Institute.

== Politics ==
Mohamed's political career began in 2005, when he was nominated as a councillor and later served as the mayor of Migori County Council. In 2013, he was elected as the Member of Parliament for Suna East Constituency on an ODM party ticket, becoming the first Kenyan Somali to win a parliamentary seat in the predominantly Luo region. He was re-elected in 2017 and 2022, serving three consecutive terms.

Throughout his tenure, Mohamed has been an active member of various parliamentary committees, including the House Business Committee, the Justice and Legal Affairs Committee, and the Public Debt and Privatization Committee. He is also known for his robust contributions to debates on bills, motions, and reports in the National Assembly.

Mohamed currently serves as the Minority Leader in Kenya's National Assembly, a position he assumed in September 2022.

== Controversy ==
=== NYS scandal ===
Junet was implicated in the NYS Scandal where it was alleged that he won dubious contracts and for it he received money worth hundreds of millions of Kenya shillings through his companies, money some of which he is alleged to have shared with the then ODM Party leader Raila Odinga. He denied any involvements in the matter and no investigations have since been done on the same.

== See also ==
- 11th Parliament of Kenya
- 12th Parliament of Kenya
- 13th Parliament of Kenya
