= Zamzam Mohamed =

Kenyan politician

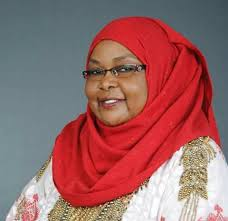

Zamzam Mohamed is a Kenyan politician from the Orange Democratic Movement.

== Political career ==
Mohamed was elected women's representative in the National Assembly from Mombasa County in the 2022 general election.
