= Economic Freedom Party =

Political party in Kenya

The Economic Freedom Party (EFP) is a left-leaning political party in Kenya that seeks to establish the economic freedom of the Kenyan people.

== History ==
The EFP was established in March 2017 by politicians from Mandera County including Senator Billow Kerrow and MPs Mohamed Huka and Fathia Mabub after they had left the United Republican Party and the Jubilee Alliance. The party was officially launched in Nairobi in April. In the 2017 general elections, the party won five seats in the National Assembly. It is a member of the Kenya Kwanza alliance. The EFP regards itself as the sister party of South Africa's Economic Freedom Fighters.
