= Anne Wamuratha =

Kenyan politician

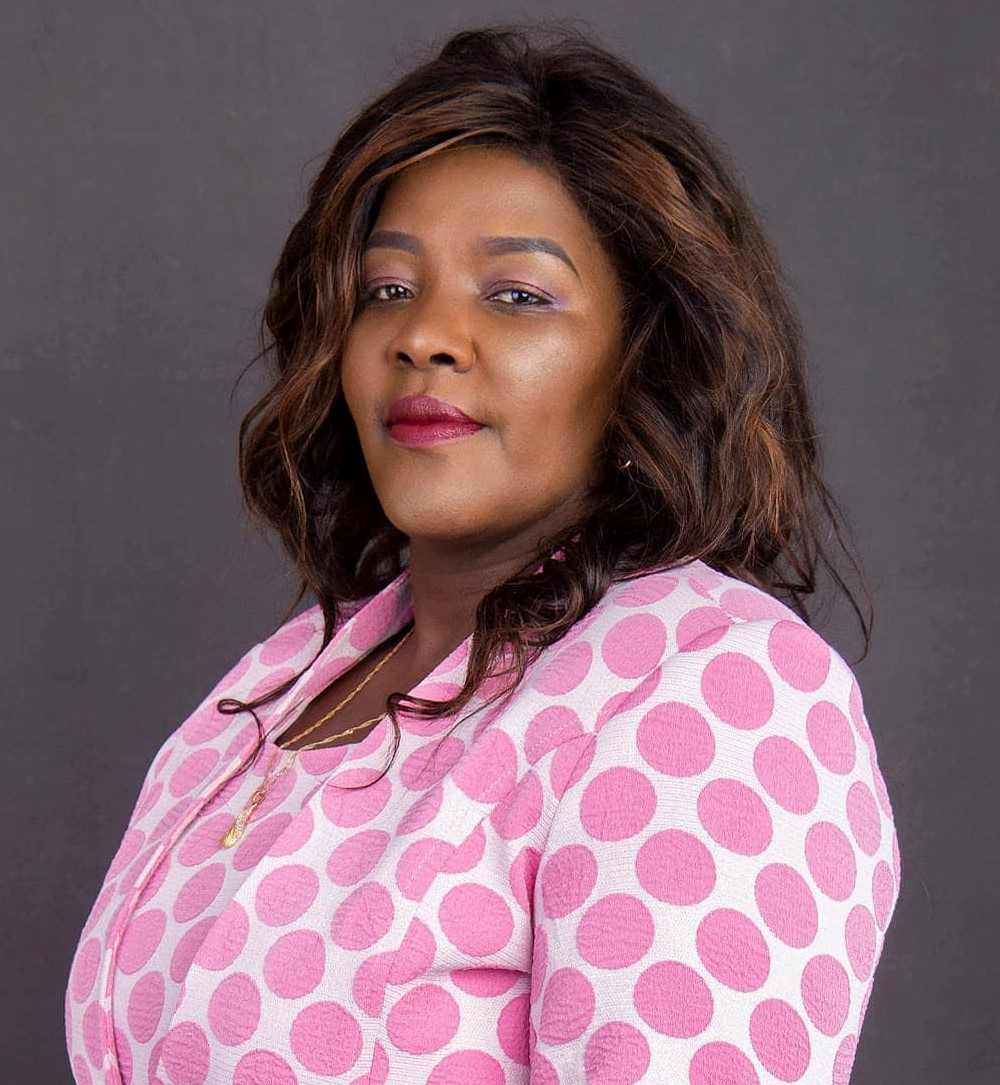

Women Representative for Kiambu County
- Incumbent
- Assumed office 16 August 2022
- Preceded by: Gathoni Wa Muchomba

Personal details
- Party: UDA

Anne Wamuratha is a Kenyan politician who is currently a member of the Kenya National Assembly as the woman representative for Kiambu. She is a member of the UDA. Before politics, she worked as a family counselor. She has received praise for strong constituent service, but simultaneously voted for some unpopular measures, such as in favor of the controversial 2024 Kenya finance bill and to impeach deputy president Rigathi Gachagua.
