= Movement for Democracy and Growth =

Political party in Kenya

- Headquarters: Nairobi, Kenya
- National affiliation: Azimio la Umoja
- Colors: Green
- National Assembly: 1 / 349
- Senate: 0 / 67

The Movement for Democracy and Growth is a political party in Kenya.

== History ==
The party contested the 2022 Kenyan general election as part of Azimio La Umoja. After the election party leader David Ochieng Ouma, Senator Fred Outa, Olago Oluoch and Governor Jack Ranguma joined Kenya Kwanza.
