= Pamela Njoki Njeru =

Embu county Woman Representative

Pamela Njoki Njeri

Parliament of Kenya

Personal details
- Citizenship: Kenya
- Party: United Democratic Alliance (UDA)
- Education: Bachelor Degree in Communications and Public Relations from Moi University
- Occupation: Politician
- Awards: Honorary Doctorate Degree In Leadership from Darcas International College

Pamela Njoki Njeru is a Kenyan politician and member of Parliament through United Democratic Alliance (UDA) political party.

== Education background ==
Njeru studied secretarial course at Nairobi Baptist Center, she also studied Certificate in Radio Production and Diploma in Journalism and Mass Communication at Kenya Institute of Mass Communication (KIMC). She holds Bachelor Degree in Communications and Public Relations from Moi University.

== Career ==
She is a journalist by profession. She started her media career by being a Secretary at Kenya Broadcasting Corporation (KBC) then she became the Radio Head at the same Institution. Later she joined Royal Media Services as a Radio Manager until 2022 when she transitioned into a political career.

== Political career ==
Njeru is a member of United Democratic Party (UDA) political party. She was elected as Women's Representative for Embu county at Kenyan National Assembly since August 2022 until now.

== Awards ==
Honorary Doctorate Degree In Leadership from Darcas International College
