= United Progressive Alliance (Kenya) =

Political party in Kenya

- Abbreviation: DAP
- Headquarters: Nairobi, Kenya
- National affiliation: Azimio la Umoja
- Colors: Red
- National Assembly: 2 / 349
- Senate: 0 / 67

The United Progressive Alliance is a political party in Kenya.

== History ==
The party contested the 2022 Kenyan general election as part of the Azimio La Umoja political alliance and one MP was elected to the 13th Parliament of Kenya.
