= United Party of Independent Alliance =

Political party in Kenya

- Abbreviation: UPIA
- Headquarters: Nairobi, Kenya
- National affiliation: Kenya Kwanza (since 2022); Azimio la Umoja (until 2022)
- Colors: Red
- National Assembly: 2 / 349
- Senate: 0 / 67

The United Party of Independent Alliance (UPIA) is a political party in Kenya.

== History ==
The party contested the 2022 Kenyan general election as part Azimio La Umoja. Two members were elected to the National Assembly. After the general election, the two UPIA elected members switched to the rival Kenya Kwanza alliance.

== Elected representatives ==
Constituency	MP
Bura	Yakub Adow
Moyale	Guyo Waqo Jaldesa

== See also ==
- List of political parties in Kenya
