= Pamoja African Alliance =

Kenyan political party

- Abbreviation: PAA
- Leader: Amason Kingi
- Headquarters: Nairobi, Kenya
- National affiliation: Azimio la Umoja
- Colors: Blue
- National Assembly: 3 / 349
- Senate: 0 / 67

The Pamoja African Alliance (PAA) is a political party in Kenya. It is led by Amason Kingi.

== History ==
In May 2022, the party left the Azimio La Umoja alliance and joined the Kenya Kwanza coalition. It presented contestants in the August 2022 general election and won 4 seats in the National Assembly.

== See also ==
- List of political parties in Kenya
