= Betty Maina =

Kenyan politician

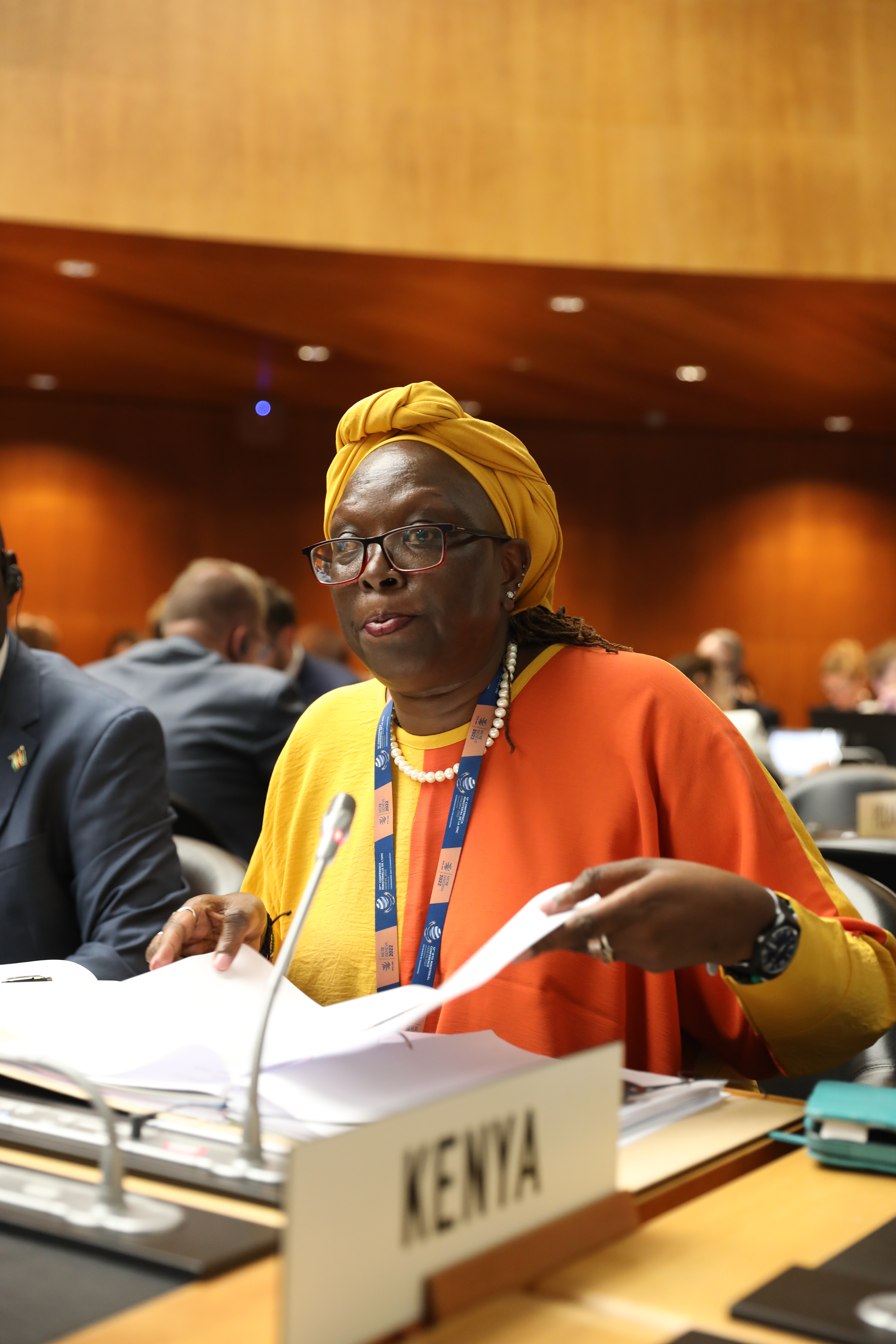

Secretary for Industrialization, Trade and Enterprise Development

Personal details
- Education: University College of London
- Occupation: Politician

Betty Maina is a Kenyan politician who is currently Cabinet Secretary for Industrialization, Trade and Enterprise Development in the cabinet of Kenya.

Prior to taking up her position in the cabinet in 2020 she held roles at the Kenya Association of Manufacturers and the United Nations and as the Principal Secretary of the department for Industrialization, Trade and Enterprise Development.

== Education ==
Maina obtained a Master of Science Degree in Development Administration and planning from the University College of London in 1998.
