= Irene Muthoni Kasalu =

Kenyan politician

- Citizenship: Kenya
- Education: University of Nairobi (BSc, PhD) Leicester University (MSc, PhD)
- Alma mater: Leicester University
- Occupation: Kenya Politician
- Organization: British American Insurance Company Ltd (BAIC)
- Known for: Women Representative for Kitui County
- Political party: Wiper Democratic Movement- Kenya party

Irene Muthoni Kasalu is a Kenyan politician. She is the Woman Representative for Kitui County in Kenya and has been serving in this position since 2017 and was re-elected in 2022. She is also a Wiper Democratic Movement party member. Kasalu worked as a lecturer before her political career.

== Education ==
Between 1995 and 1998, Irene Kasalu attended Kenya High School to complete her secondary education and receive her KCSE Between 2002 and 2005, she furthered her education at the University of Nairobi, where she graduated with a Bachelor of Science in Mathematics and later from 2012 to 2014, she completed a Postgraduate Diploma in Actuarial Science.

Building on her academic journey, she earned a Master of Science in Finance from that same institution between 2012 and 2014, and subsequently completed her PhD in Applied Mathematics at Leicester University from 2014 to 2016. She is also a member of the Actuarial Institute .

== Career ==
Irene Kasalu started her Professional career in the development and mathematical sectors. She worked from 2004 to 2007 as Regional Administrator for the African Millenium Mathematics Initiative. Afterwards, she worked with British American Insurance Company Ltd (BAIC) from 2008 to 2011 as a Financial Advisor. She is also a Lecturer who taught Mathematics and Finance at Meru University and University of Nairobi from 2011 to 2015.

She is a member at the National Assembly of Parliament which began on 31 August 2017. She is also a member of Wiper Democratic Movement Kenya at the National Assembly which also began in August 2022.
