= Grand Dream Development Party =

Political party in Kenya

- Abbreviation: GDDP
- Headquarters: Nairobi, Kenya
- Colors: Blue
- National Assembly: 1 / 349
- Senate: 0 / 67

The Grand Dream Development Party (GDDP) is a political party in Kenya.

== History ==
The party endorsed Mwangi wa Iria in the 2022 Kenyan presidential election. One member of the National Assembly was elected in the 2022 general election, Fabian Kyule Mule in Kangundo constituency.
