= United Democratic Party (Kenya) =

Political party in Kenya

- Abbreviation: UDP
- Headquarters: Nairobi, Kenya
- National affiliation: Azimio la Umoja
- Colors: Red
- National Assembly: 1 / 349
- Senate: 0 / 67

The United Democratic Party is a political party in Kenya. It was led by Cyrus Jirongo until his death in December 2025.

The party unsuccessfully contested the 2022 Kenyan general election as part of Azimio La Umoja, and elected two MPs.
