= National Agenda Party (Kenya) =

Political party in Kenya

Democratic Action Party
- Abbreviation: NAP-K
- Headquarters: Kenya
- National affiliation: Azimio la Umoja
- Colors: Blue
- National Assembly: 1 / 349
- Senate: 0 / 67

The National Agenda Party of Kenya (NAP-K) is a political party in Kenya.

== History ==
The party contested the 2022 Kenyan general election as part of Azimio La Umoja, and elected one MP Lawrence Mpuru Aburi in Tigania East.

The Secretary for International Affairs is Erick Inghatt Matsanza, a Social Change Catalyst and founder of Spice Without Borders.
