= Chama Cha Kazi =

Political party in Kenya

- Abbreviation: CCK
- Founder: Moses Kuria
- Founded: 2021
- Headquarters: Nairobi, Kenya
- National affiliation: Kenya Kwanza
- Colors: Blue
- Slogan: "Kazi na Pesa"
- National Assembly: 1 / 349
- Senate: 0 / 67

The Chama Cha Kazi (lit. 'Party of Labour' or 'Labour Party') is a political party in Kenya. The party motto "Kazi na Pesa" loosely translates into "Work and Money".

== History ==
The party was founded in 2021 by Moses Kuria after he left the People's Empowerment Party.

In April 2022, the party faced a schism. They contested the 2022 Kenyan general election as part of Kenya Kwanza, and elected one MP. Following his nomination as a cabinet secretary, Kuria started a process of disbanding his party to join the United Democratic Alliance.

Chama Cha Kazi stood candidates in the November 2025 by-elections in Embu.
