= Baringo South Constituency =

Baringo South
- constituency
- Country: Kenya
- County: Baringo County

Baringo South is a constituency in Kenya. It is one of six constituencies in Baringo County.

2013_2017: Hon. Grace Kipchoim- URP

2017-2018: Hon. Grace Kipchoim- Jubilee

2018-2022: Hon. Charles Kamure- Jubilee( By-election)

2022- Incumbent : Hon. Charles Kamuren-UDA
