= Maendeleo Chap Chap Party =

Political party in Kenya

- Abbreviation: MCC
- Leader: Alfred Mutua
- Headquarters: Nairobi, Kenya
- National affiliation: Azimio la Umoja
- Colors: Purple
- National Assembly: 2 / 349
- Senate: 0 / 67

The Maendeleo Chap Chap Party (MCC) is a political party in Kenya.

== History ==
The MCC was established by Alfred Mutua, Governor of Machakos County, on 25 August 2016. In the 2017 general elections the party endorsed incumbent President Uhuru Kenyatta, also winning four seats in the National Assembly.
