= Democratic Party (Kenya) =

Political party in Kenya

Democratic Party of Kenya
- Founder: Mwai Kibaki
- Founded: 25 December 1991
- Headquarters: Gitanga Road, Lavington, Nairobi
- Ideology: Conservatism
- Political position: Centre-right to right-wing
- National affiliation: Kenya Kwanza
- Regional affiliation: Democrat Union of Africa
- International affiliation: International Democracy Union
- Slogan: Unity & Peace

Website
- https://www.democraticpartyofkenya.co.ke

The Democratic Party (DP) is a conservative political party in Kenya. The party was founded in 1991 by John Keen and Mwai Kibaki after section 2A of the constitution was repealed.

== History ==
At the legislative elections, 27 December 2002, the party was a partner in the National Rainbow Coalition, which won 56.1% of the popular vote and 125 out of 210 elected seats. The party itself took 36 of these seats. At the presidential elections of the same day, the party supported Kibaki, who won 62.2% and was elected.

At the 2007 Kenyan general election, the Democratic Party formed part of the Party of National Unity led by Kibaki. One of the DP's members, Wilfred Machage, was named a cabinet minister in the half cabinet which Kibaki named prior to the formation of the Grand Coalition government.

In the 2022 Kenyan general election, the party aligned itself with the Kenya Kwanza alliance of William Ruto, who would go on to become Kenya's next president.
