= Amani National Congress =

Political party in Kenya

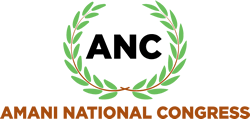
- Leader: Issa Timamy
- Chairman: Kelvin Lunani
- Founder: Musalia Mudavadi
- Founded: 2015
- Split from: United Democratic Forum Party
- Ideology: Social liberalism
- Political position: Centre
- National affiliation: Kenya Kwanza
- National Assembly: 7 / 349
- Senate: 3 / 67
- Governors: 1 / 47

Website
- ANC

The Amani National Congress (ANC) is a social-liberal political party in Kenya. It tends to be more popular among the Luhya people.

== History ==
The party was established by Musalia Mudavadi in 2015 after he left the United Democratic Forum Party, with around 300 UDF members from Nairobi joining the new party.

Prior to the 2017 general elections Mudavadi formed the National Super Alliance, which supported Raila Odinga as its presidential candidate. The parties contested the parliamentary elections alone, with the ANC becoming the fourth largest in Parliament, winning three seats in the Senate and fourteen in the National Assembly.
