= Kenya Kwanza =

Coalition of political groups in Kenya

Kenya First Kenya Kwanza
- Leader: William Ruto
- Deputy Leader: Kithure Kindiki
- Founded: January 2022
- Political position: Big tent
- Members: UDA; ANC; FORD–Kenya; EFP; TSP; UMP; TWP; CCK; DPK; FP; DP
- Colours: Yellow; Green; Black
- National Assembly: 161 / 349
- Senate: 33 / 67
- Governors: 24 / 47

Kenya Kwanza (Swahili: "Kenya First") is a Kenyan political alliance currently headed by William Ruto. The political coalition currently holds the speakership position in both the National Assembly and Senate of Kenya. It was formed in the period leading up to the 2022 Kenyan general election, originally consisting of three parties: the United Democratic Alliance (UDA), Amani National Congress and FORD–Kenya. By 8 April 2022, several more political parties had joined the alliance, bringing the total number of constituent parties to 12. On 18 August 2022, a number of politicians from the United Democratic Movement announced they would be joining the alliance.

The coalition instruments affirm that the constituent parties themselves remain independent with their own leadership structures. In practice, however, the various party organs and committees harmonize their decisions with each other. In addition to supporting a common presidential and vice presidential candidate, the constituent parties do, upon consensus, field a common candidate in various other elective positions.

== History ==
After arriving at a coalition deal, the Kenya Kwanza Alliance announced that the positions of the coalition's flag-bearer and running-mate were reserved for the UDA. Thus, UDA party leader William Ruto became the coalition's designated presidential candidate. William Ruto chose Rigathi Gachagua as his running mate, in what was perceived as a blunder at the time, overlooking Kithure Kindiki, the senator for Tharaka Nithi. The Kenya Kwanza coalition deal also stipulated that, upon winning the election, the position of Prime Cabinet Secretary was to be created and reserved for the founding party, the Amani National Congress. The positions of Speaker of the National Assembly and Speaker of the Senate were reserved for FORD-Kenya and the Pamoja African Alliance, respectively.

After the 2022 elections, a dispute ensued between Kenya Kwanza and its main rival coalition, Azimio la Umoja, after both sides claimed to hold the majority in Parliament. Both the Speaker of the National Assembly, Moses Wetangula, and his Senate counterpart, Amason Kingi, ruled in favor of Kenya Kwanza.

In 2024, the Kenya Kwanza coalition and President Ruto faced widespread popular protests over proposed tax hikes.

== Current composition ==
Alternate logo

As of 12 April 2022, the alliance consisted of the following political parties:

Name	Leader	Main ideology	Political position
United Democratic Alliance (UDA)	William Ruto	Conservatism	Centre-right
Amani National Congress (ANC)	Musalia Mudavadi	Social liberalism	Centre
Forum for the Restoration of Democracy (FORD–Kenya)	Moses Wetangula	Social democracy	Centre-left
National Agenda Party of Kenya (NAP-K)	Alfayo Alfonze Agufana	Social Democracy	Centre-left
Economic Freedom Party (EFP)	Issack Hassan	Economic freedom	Centre-left
The Service Party (TSP)	Mwangi Kiunjuri		
Umoja na Maendeleo Party (UMP)	Martin Wambora		
Tujibebe Wakenya Party (TWP)	William Kabogo		
Chama Cha Kazi (CCK)	Moses Kuria	Populism	
Devolution Party of Kenya (DPK)	Gunga Mwinga	Devolution	Centre
Farmers Party (FP)	Irungu Nyakera	Agrarianism	Centre-right
Democratic Party (DP)	Justin Muturi	Conservatism	Centre-right
