= Azimio la Umoja =

Azimio la Umoja–One Kenya Coalition Party
- Leader: Stephen Kalonzo Musyoka
- General Secretary: Caroli Omondi
- Deputy Leader: Martha Karua
- Patron: Uhuru Kenyatta
- Founded: 12 March 2022
- Preceded by: National Super Alliance
- Members: Jubilee, ODM, Wiper, KANU, NARC, MP, CCU and others
- Colours: Blue; Orange
- National Assembly: 173 / 349
- Senate: 33 / 67
- Governors: 22 / 47

Azimio la Umoja–One Kenya Coalition Party, popularly referred to as Azimio la Umoja (Swahili for "Resolution for Unity"), or simply Azimio, is a Kenyan political alliance and party. It is composed of the Orange Democratic Movement, the Jubilee Party, NARC–Kenya, KANU, and other parties. Former president Uhuru Kenyatta is the party's patron. The alliance fielded the late Raila Odinga as its presidential candidate and Martha Karua as its deputy presidential candidate in the 2022 Kenyan election, which they lost.

== History ==
The alliance unveiled their manifesto at Nyayo National Stadium in June 2022. On 18 August 2022, 7 MPs, 2 senators, and two governors left Azimio and joined the rival Kenya Kwanza alliance of president-elect William Ruto. The next day, 2 more MPs, one from the UPIA and another from the DAP-K, switched to Kenya Kwanza as well.

After losing the 2022 elections, Azimio la Umoja became the main opposition alliance. On 4 October 2022, Ruto lifted the ban on genetically modified crops, making Kenya the second country in Africa to approve them. Wiper Democratic Movement leader Kalonzo Musyoka has asked the president to reconsider the ban and also urged the clergy to intervene in the matter.

On 3 February 2026, the coalition patron, Former President Uhuru Kenyatta, announced that Kalonzo Musyoka would take over as party leader following the death of former Prime Minister Raila Odinga.

== Composition ==
It was composed of 26 different parties on registration. On 12 April 2022, the alliance consisted of mainly 23 parties: As of March 2026, its member parties were National Rainbow Coalition-Kenya (Narc-K), Labour Party of Kenya (LPK), Wiper Democratic Movement (WDM), Party of National Unity (Kenya) (PNU), Orange Democratic Movement (ODM), Jubilee Party (JP), National Rainbow Coalition (NARC), Kenya African National Union (KANU), Chama Cha Uzalendo (CCU), United Party of Independent Alliance (UPIA), Muungano Party (MP), Ubuntu People’s Forum, United Democratic Party (Kenya) (UDP), Kenya Reforms Party (KRP), Peoples Trust Party (PTP), National Liberal Party (NLP), Movement for Democracy & Growth (MDG), United Progressive Alliance (UPA), Democratic Action Party (Kenya), Party for Peace and Democracy (PPD), Kenya Union Party (KUP), Party for Growth and Prosperity (PGP).

== 2026 planned ODM exit ==
On 2 February 2026, the Azimio Coalition Party Council and National Executive Committee, removed Junet Mohamed as the coalition's secretary general, replacing him with Caroli Omondi, Raphael Tuju replaced with Philip Kisiwa as executive director and Kalonzo Musyoka as the new party leader. These actions were taken due to the individuals' support of the government, which is at odds with Azimio's official stance. The council determined to give opportunities to new parties to join the coalition. ODM responded by issuing a 90 day formal notice of withdrawal from the Azimio Coalition by its National Executive Committee. Acting ODM leader Oburu said the Orange Democratic Movement was not consulted and termed the moves as "inconsequential", since ODM was the largest party in the coalition. On 9 March, the coalition removed Junet Mohamed as leader of its parliamentary group, replacing him with Suba South MP Caroli Omondi.

== See also ==
- Kenya Kwanza – Coalition of political groups in Kenya
- Coalition for Reforms and Democracy
