= National Assembly (Kenya) =

Lower house of the Parliament of Kenya

Coordinates: 1°17′24″S 36°49′12″E

National Assembly of the Republic of Kenya Bunge la Taifa la Kenya
- 13th Parliament

Type
- Type: Lower house of the Parliament of Kenya Unicameral (1966–2013) Lower house (1963–1966)

History
- Founded: 1963
- Preceded by: Legislative Council of Kenya
- New session started: 8 September 2022

Leadership
- Speaker: Moses Wetang'ula, Kenya Kwanza since 8 September 2022
- Deputy Speaker: Gladys Boss Shollei, Kenya Kwanza
- Majority Leader: Kimani Ichungwah, Kenya Kwanza
- Majority Whip: Silvanus O. Osoro, Kenya Kwanza
- Minority Leader: Junet Mohamed, Azimio la Umoja
- Minority Whip: Millie Odhiambo, Azimio la Umoja

Structure
- Seats: Speaker (non-voting); 349
- Political groups: Government (337): Kenya Kwanza (179); UDA (143); ANC (7); FORD–K (6); TSP (2); CCK (1); DP (1); GDDP (1); PAA (3); UDM (5); MCC (2); UPIA (2); UPA (2); MDG (1); Azimio la Umoja (158); ODM (89); Jubilee (30); WPF (26); DAP (5); KANU (5); KUP (3); NOPEU (1); NAP (1); UDP (1); Independents (12): Independents (12)

Elections
- Voting system: First-past-the-post voting
- First election: 18–26 May 1963
- Last election: 9 August 2022
- Next election: By 10 August 2027

Meeting place
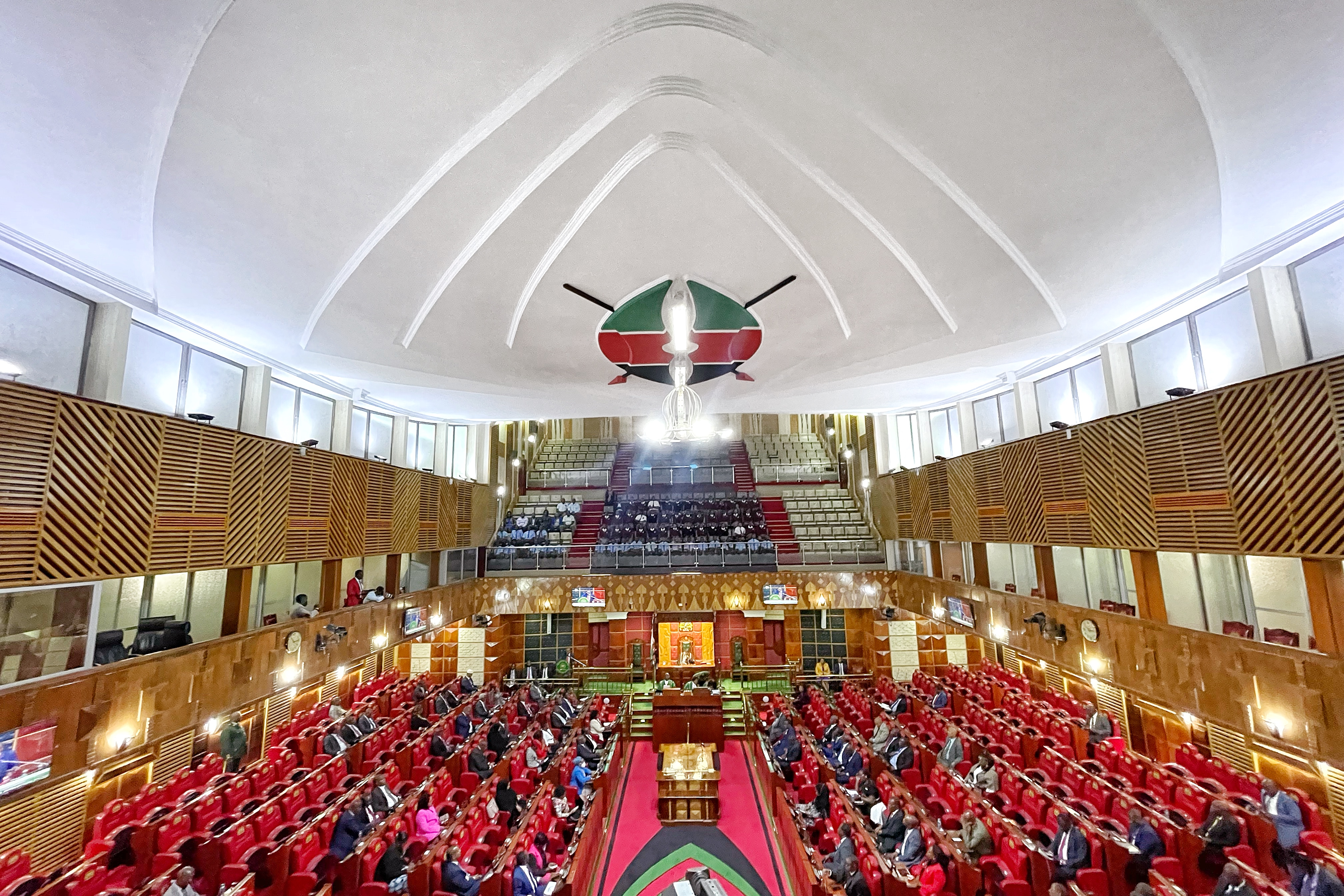
- National Assembly Chamber; Parliament buildings, Nairobi, Kenya

Website
- Official website

The National Assembly of the Republic of Kenya (formerly House of Representatives) is one of the two Houses of the Parliament of Kenya. Between 1966 and 2013, it served as a unicameral house. In 2013 (11th Parliament), it became the lower house when the Senate was reestablished.

It has a total of 349 seats: 290 elected from the constituencies, 47 women elected from the counties and 12 nominated representatives. The Speaker of the National Assembly of Kenya serves as an ex officio member.

The High Court of Kenya ordered lawmakers to introduce gender quotas, or face dissolution in the mid-2010s, following the implementation of the 2010 Constitution.

== Committees ==
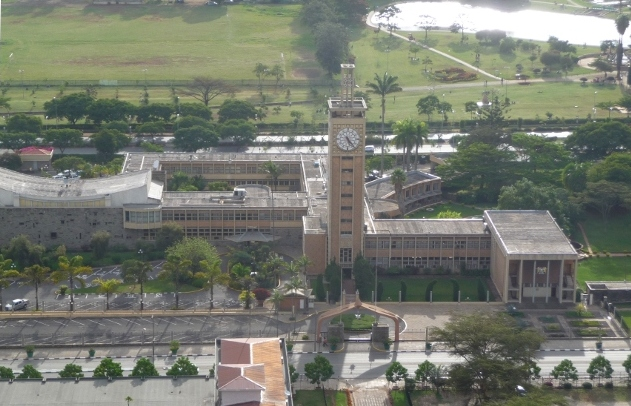
Parliament Buildings, Nairobi, Kenya

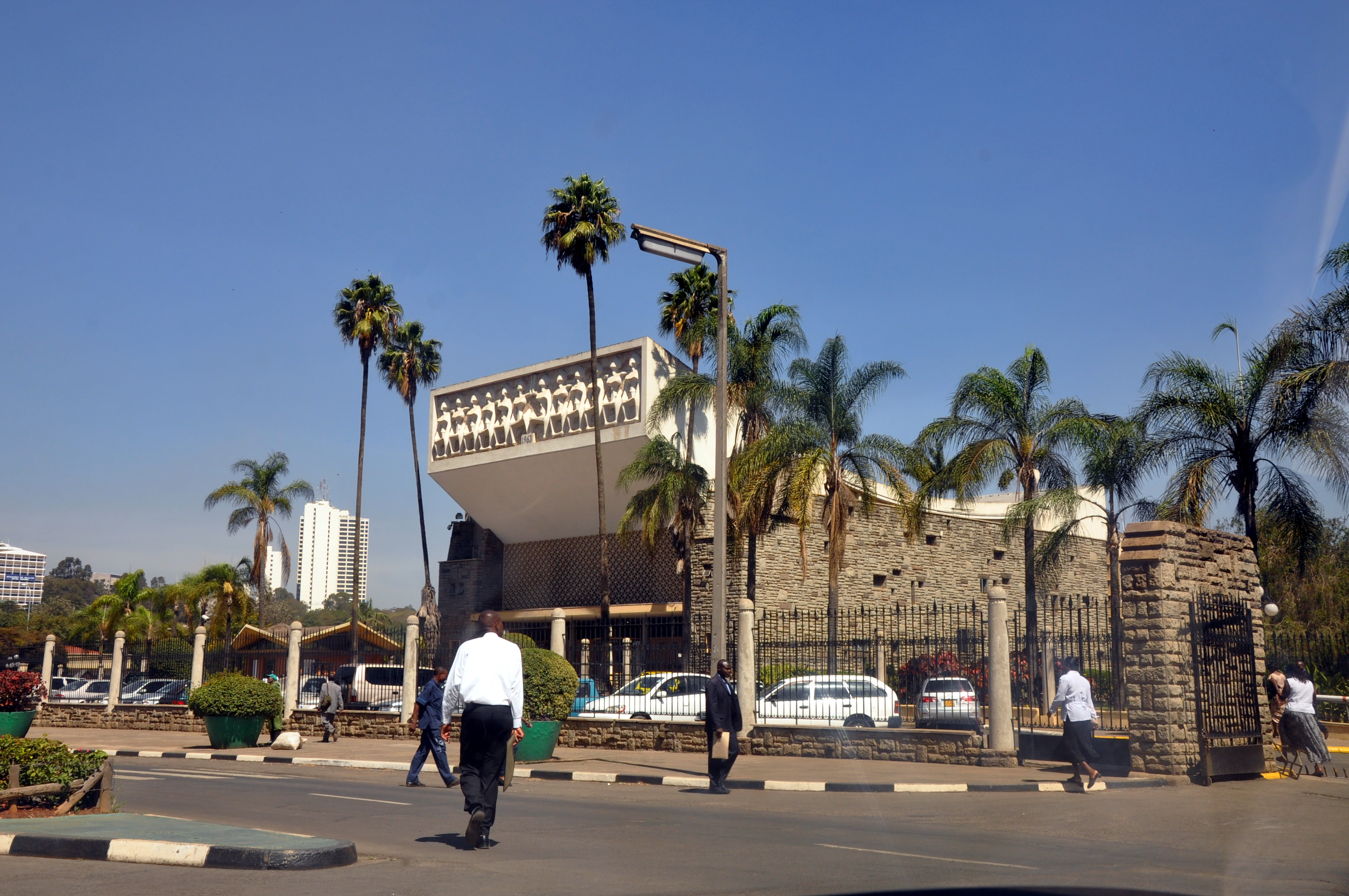
Parliament buildings, Nairobi

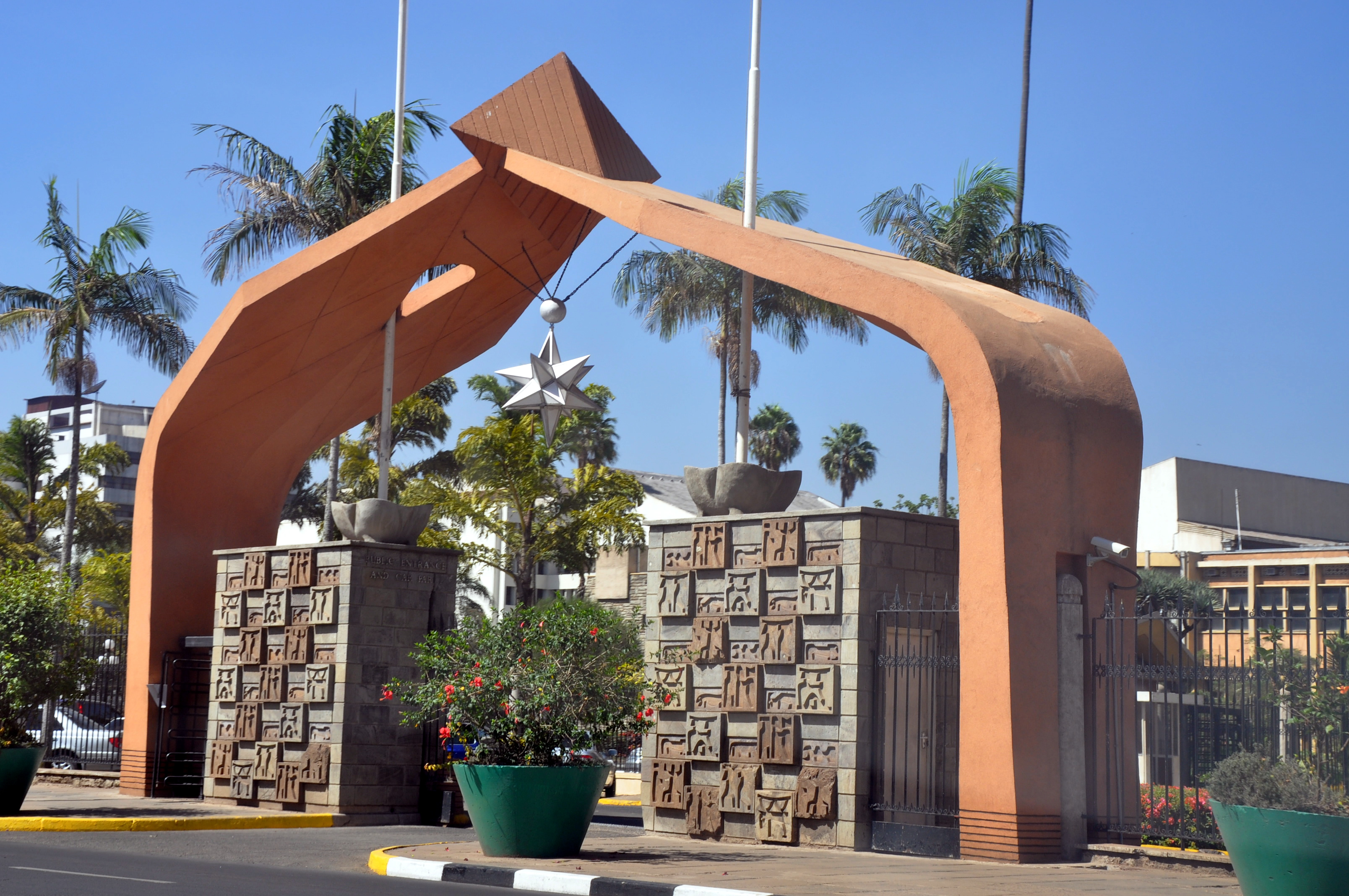
Entrance to the Parliament Buildings, Nairobi

House Keeping committees

- House Business Committee: creates Parliamentary calendar; schedules committee business; issues directives and guidelines to prioritise or postpone any business of the House.
- Procedure & House Rules Committee: proposes rules for the orderly and effective conduct of committee business.
- Liaison Committee: guides and co-ordinates the operations, policies and mandates of all committees.
- Committee on Selection: nominates members to serve in committees.
- Committee on Members Services & Facilities.

Investigatory Committees

- Public Accounts Committee: responsible for the examination of the accounts showing the appropriations of the sum voted by the House to meet the public expenditure and of such other accounts
- Public Investments Committee: examines the reports and accounts of public investments

Special Funds Accounts Committee: examines the reports and accounts of national Funds except the National Governments Constituency Development Fund (NGCDF)

Departmental committees:

- Defence and Foreign Relations Committee: Defence, intelligence, foreign relations diplomatic and consular services, international boundaries, international relations, agreements, treaties and conventions
- Administration and National Security Committee: National security, police services, home affairs, public administration, public service, prisons, immigration and the management of natural disasters, community service orders
- Agriculture & Livestock Committee: Agriculture, livestock, irrigation, fisheries development, co-operatives development, production and marketing
- Environment and Natural Resources Committee: Matters relating to climate change, environment management and conservation, forestry, water resource management, wildlife, mining and natural resources, pollution and waste management
- Education & Research Committee: Education, training, research and technological advancement
- Energy Committee: Fossil fuels exploration, Development, production, maintenance and regulation of energy, communication, information, broadcasting and Information Communications Technology (ICT) development and management
- Finance and Planning: Public finance, monetary policies, public debt, financial institutions, investment and divestiture policies, pricing policies, banking, insurance, population, revenue policies, planning, national development, trade, tourism promotion and management, commerce and industry
- Health Committee: Matters related to health, medical care and health insurance
- Justice and Legal Affairs Committee: Constitutional affairs, the administration of law and justice, including the Judiciary, public prosecutions, elections, ethics, integrity and anti-corruption and human rights
- Labour and Social Welfare Committee: Labour, trade union relations, manpower or human resource planning, gender, culture and social welfare, youth, National Youth Service children's welfare; national heritage, betting, lotteries and sports
- Lands Committee: Matters related to lands and settlement
- Transport, Public Works and Housing Committee: Transport, roads, public works, construction and maintenance of roads, rails and buildings, air, seaports and housing
- Trade, Industry and Cooperatives Committee
- Communication, Information and Innovation Committee

Other Select committees:

- Budget and Appropriations Committee: investigates, inquires into and reports on all matters related to co-ordination, control and monitoring of the national budget; examines the Budget Policy Statement; examines bills related to the national budget, specifically the Appropriations Bill, the Supplementary Appropriation Bill, the Division of Revenue Bill and the County Allocation of Revenue Bill
- Committee on Implementation: responsible for scrutinising the resolutions of the House (including adopted committee reports), petitions and the undertakings given by the National Executive
- Committee on Delegated Legislation: delegates on statutory instruments submitted to the Assembly
- Committee on Regional Integration: examine the records of all the relevant debates and resolutions of the meetings of the East African Legislative Assembly; inquires into and examines any other matter relating to regional integration generally requiring action by the House
- Committee on Appointments:
- National Government Constituency Development Fund Committee
- Constitution Implementation Oversight Committee
- Pensions Committee
- Committee on National Cohesion and Equal Opportunity
- Parliamentary Broadcasting and Library Committee

== Coalition and party summary ==
See also, Kenya National Assembly elections, 2013. For a list of current members, see 12th Parliament of Kenya#Members

Prior to the 2013 elections, the Jubilee Alliance consisted of The National Alliance, United Republican Party, and the National Rainbow Coalition. After the results were announced, Jubilee made post-election agreements with the New Ford Kenya, Alliance Party of Kenya, Chama Cha Uzalendo, People's Democratic Party, Ford People, Kenya African National Union, and United Democratic Forum. Reports indicate that two independents, NARC-Kenya, and one member of the Federal Party of Kenya also agreed to work with Jubilee.

== Composition of the Kenyan National Assembly (11th Parliament, 2013–2017) ==
Coalition	Party	Constituency Representatives	Women County Representatives	Nominated Representatives	Total
Kenya Kwanza (Government)	UDA	103	25	5	133
Kenya Kwanza (Government)	ANC	7	1	0	8
Kenya Kwanza (Government)	FORD-K	5	0	1	6
Kenya Kwanza (Government)	TSP	2	0	0	2
Kenya Kwanza (Government)	CCK	1	0	0	1
Kenya Kwanza (Government)	DP	1	0	0	1
Kenya Kwanza (Government)	GDDP	1	0	0	1
Kenya Kwanza (Government)	PAA*	3	0	0	3
Kenya Kwanza (Government)	UDM*	6	2	0	8
Kenya Kwanza (Government)	MCC*	2	0	0	2
Kenya Kwanza (Government)	UPIA*	2	0	0	2
Kenya Kwanza (Government)	UPA*	2	0	0	2
Kenya Kwanza (Government)	MDG*	1	0	0	1
Kenya Kwanza (Government)	*Post-election transfers*	10	0	0	10
Kenya Kwanza Total		143	28	8	179
Azimio la Umoja (Opposition)	ODM	64	15	3	82
Azimio la Umoja (Opposition)	JUBILEE	21	3	1	25
Azimio la Umoja (Opposition)	WIPER	20	6	1	27
Azimio la Umoja (Opposition)	DAP-K	5	0	0	5
Azimio la Umoja (Opposition)	KANU	5	1	0	6
Azimio la Umoja (Opposition)	KUP	2	1	0	3
Azimio la Umoja (Opposition)	NOPEU	1	0	0	1
Azimio la Umoja (Opposition)	NAP	1	0	0	1
Azimio la Umoja (Opposition)	UDP	1	0	0	1
Azimio Total		120	26	5	158
Unaffiliated	Independent	2	0	0	12
Unaffiliated	Total	2	0	0	12
Vacant		2	0	0	2
Grand Total		290	47	12	349

== Composition of the Kenyan National Assembly (12th Parliament, 2017–2022) ==
12th Parliament Grouped by Political Affiliation
Coalition / Affiliation	Party	Constituency	Women Reps	Nominated	Speaker	Total
Jubilee & Affiliates (Government)	Jubilee Party	141	25	6	1	173
Jubilee & Affiliates (Government)	KANU	8	2	0	0	10
Jubilee & Affiliates (Government)	EFP	4	1	0	0	5
Jubilee & Affiliates (Government)	MCCP	3	1	0	0	4
Jubilee & Affiliates (Government)	PDR / PNU / DP / Others	7	1	0	0	8
Jubilee & Affiliates (Government)	Subtotal	163	30	6	1	200
NASA (Opposition)	ODM	59	11	3	0	73
NASA (Opposition)	Wiper	19	3	1	0	23
NASA (Opposition)	ANC	12	1	1	0	14
NASA (Opposition)	FORD–Kenya	11	1	1	0	13
NASA (Opposition)	CCM / Muungano / Others	4	0	0	0	4
NASA (Opposition)	Subtotal	105	16	6	0	127
Others	Independent	13	1	0	0	14
Others	Small Parties / Vacant	9	0	0	0	9
Others	Subtotal	22	1	0	0	23
Total		290	47	12	1	350

Notes: The two primary blocs were the Jubilee Coalition (ruling) and the National Super Alliance (NASA) (opposition).

- The Jubilee Giant: The Jubilee Party alone held nearly 50% of the house. With its affiliates, it maintained a comfortable working majority (over 200 seats).
- The NASA Bloc: While a formidable opposition with 127 seats, the coalition was significantly smaller than the ruling bloc, making it difficult to block legislation without the help of independents or disgruntled Jubilee members.
- Independents: With 14 members, Independents actually held more seats than several established political parties like FORD-Kenya or KANU.
- Jubilee Leaners: Includes PDR, PNU, DP, Frontier Alliance, and NAPK.
- NASA Leaners: Includes CCM, Muungano, MDG, and CCU.
- Others: Includes KNC, KPP, PDP, ND, and the vacant seat.*

== Composition of the Kenyan National Assembly (13th Parliament, 2022–2027) ==
Composition of the National Assembly of Kenya 13th Parliament (2022–2027) by Coalition
Coalition	Party	Constituency	Woman Rep	Nominated	Total
Kenya Kwanza (Government)	United Democratic Alliance (UDA)	103	25	5	133
Kenya Kwanza (Government)	Amani National Congress (ANC)	6	1	1	8
Kenya Kwanza (Government)	United Democratic Movement (UDM)*	5	2	1	8
Kenya Kwanza (Government)	FORD–Kenya	6	0	0	6
Kenya Kwanza (Government)	Pamoja African Alliance (PAA)*	3	0	0	3
Kenya Kwanza (Government)	Maendeleo Chap Chap Party (MCCP)*	2	0	0	2
Kenya Kwanza (Government)	The Service Party (TSP)	2	0	0	2
Kenya Kwanza (Government)	United Party of Independent Alliance (UPIA)*	2	0	0	2
Kenya Kwanza (Government)	Chama Cha Kazi (CCK)	1	0	0	1
Kenya Kwanza (Government)	Democratic Party (Kenya) (DP)	1	0	0	1
Kenya Kwanza (Government)	Grand Dream Development Party (GDDP)	1	0	0	1
Kenya Kwanza (Government)	Movement for Democracy and Growth (MDG)*	1	0	0	1
Kenya Kwanza (Government)	Post-election Independent transfers	10	0	0	10
Kenya Kwanza Total		143	28	8	179
Azimio la Umoja (Opposition)	Orange Democratic Movement (ODM)	64	13	3	80
Azimio la Umoja (Opposition)	Jubilee Party	21	3	1	25
Azimio la Umoja (Opposition)	Wiper Democratic Movement – Kenya	20	4	1	25
Azimio la Umoja (Opposition)	Kenya African National Union (KANU)	5	1	0	6
Azimio la Umoja (Opposition)	Democratic Action Party – Kenya (DAP-K)	5	0	0	5
Azimio la Umoja (Opposition)	Kenya Union Party (KUP)	2	1	0	3
Azimio la Umoja (Opposition)	United Progressive Alliance (UPA)	1	0	0	1
Azimio la Umoja (Opposition)	Others (NOPEU, NAP-K)	2	0	0	2
Azimio Total		120	22	5	147
Uncommitted	Independent (Not aligned)	2	0	0	2
Uncommitted	Speaker (Ex-Officio)	-	-	-	1
Grand Total		290	47	12	350

Break down of the 13th Parliament of Kenya by its two primary coalitions: Kenya Kwanza (Government) and Azimio la Umoja One Kenya (Opposition).

Notes:

- Since the 2022 election, several parties (such as UDM and MDG) and Independent members signed "post-election cooperation agreements" with the government, effectively moving them from the Azimio/Independent column to the Kenya Kwanza voting bloc.
- Coalition Shifts (*): Parties marked with an asterisk were originally part of Azimio or were independent but moved to Kenya Kwanza shortly after the election to grant President William Ruto a working majority.
- **The Speaker:** While Moses Wetang’ula is the leader of FORD-Kenya, as Speaker, he is an ex-officio member and does not vote except in the case of a tie.
- Majority Threshold: A simple majority in the 349-member house (excluding the Speaker) requires 175 seats.

== See also ==
- National Assembly of Kenya elections, 2007
- Constitution of Kenya

General:

- History of Kenya
- List of national legislatures
- Legislative branch
