= Kajiado West Constituency =

Electoral sub-county in Kajiado County, Kenya

Kajiado West
- constituency for the Parliament of Kenya
- Kajiado West Constituency within Kajiado County

- Kajiado County within Kenya
- County: Kajiado
- Population: 182,849
- Area: 7,862 km^{2} (3,035.5 sq mi)

Current constituency
- Created: 2013
- Number of members: 1
- Party: UDA
- Member of Parliament: George Risa Sunkuyia
- Created from: Kajiado North
- Wards: 5

Kajiado West constituency is an electoral constituency in Kajiado County Kenya. The current member of parliament is George Sunkuyia who came after winning 2017 election over Moses Ole Sakuda. Kajiado West has five wards, They include Keekonyokie, Magadi ward, Iloodokilani, Ewuaso Oonkidong'i ward and Mosiro ward. Each of which has a member of the County Assembly. This constituency has a population of about 182,849 people (2019 census) and 52,453 registered voters (2014). Kajiado west has major towns such as Kiserian which also include Ngong Hills, Ololoitikosh, Kisamis, Magadi and the Kiserian Dam.

== Electoral history ==
Elections	MP	Party	Notes
Kajiado West Constituency created from Kajiado North
2013	Moses ole Sakuda	TNA	
2017	George Risa Sunkuyia	Jubilee Party	
2022	George Risa Sunkuyia	UDA	

== 2026 plane crash ==
On the morning of 18 September 2026, a light plane operated by the Kenya School of Flying departed from Orly Park in Birika. On board were two people: a flight instructor and their student. They were conducting a routine training exercise. The pilot reportedly attempted to make an emergency landing after encountering heavy mist that caused poor visibility. The plane crashed in Kipeto, Kajiado West Constituency, a few kilometers west of the school close to the Kipeto Wind Power Project. The student died on the spot while his instructor died while en route to the hospital.
