= Joseph Manje =

Kenyan politician

The Honourable Joseph Manje
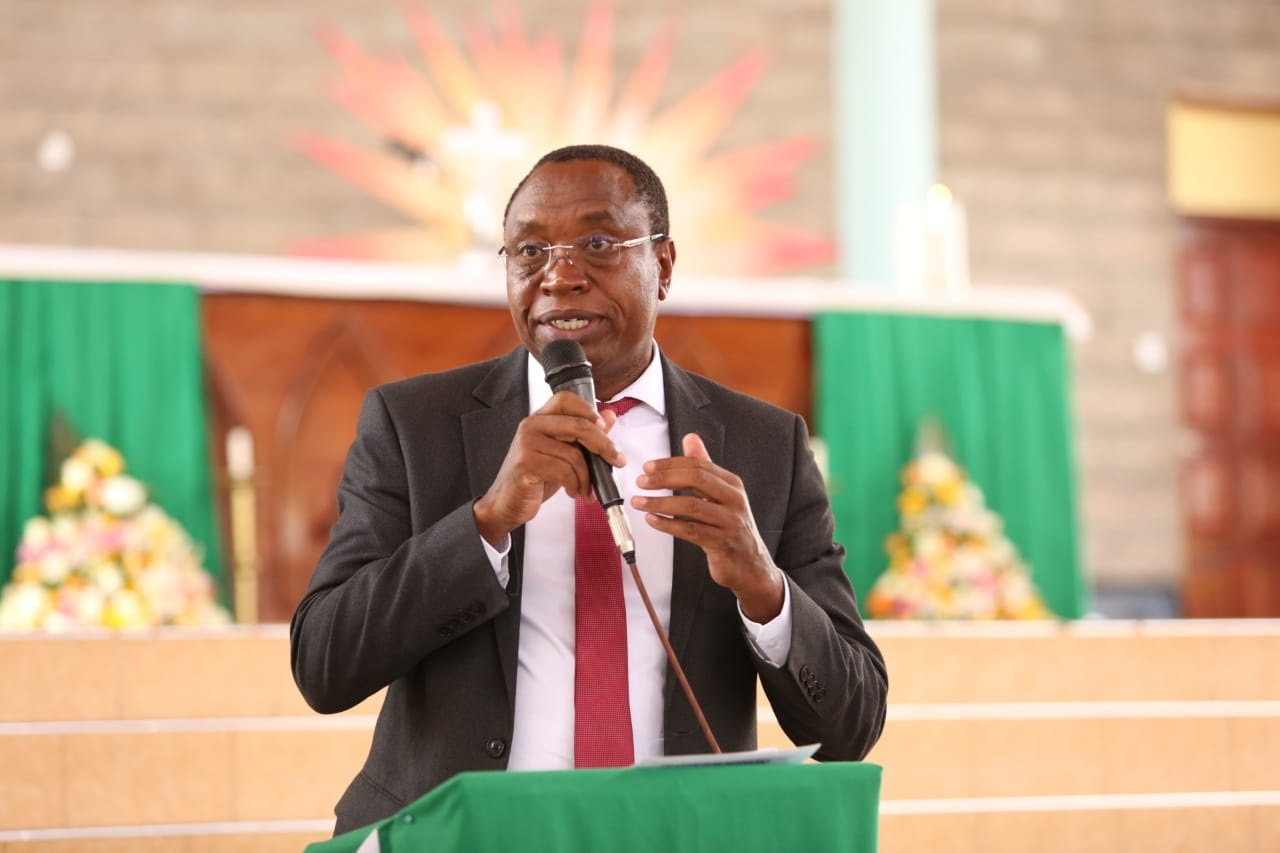

Member of Parliament
- In office 23 March 2013 – 8 August 2017
- Preceded by: Moses Ole Sakuda
- Constituency: Kajiado North
- Incumbent
- Assumed office 31 August 2017

Personal details
- Born: 20 October 1962 (age 63) Kiserian
- Citizenship: Kenyan
- Party: Jubilee
- Other political affiliations: TNA
- Spouse: Ann Wathigo
- Education: University of Nairobi; Kenya Science Teachers College
- Occupation: Politician
- Profession: Teacher

Joseph Wathigo Manje (born 20 October 1962) is a Kenyan politician, a teacher, and an entrepreneur, and currently the Member of Parliament for Kajiado North Constituency in Kajiado County. He is a member of the ruling Jubilee Party under President Uhuru Kenyatta. He previously served as a Commissioner at the Teachers Service Commission (TSC) as well as the Electoral Commission of Kenya's (ECK) South Rift Presidential Election Zonal Coordinator. He also served as a teacher employed by Kenya's Teachers Service Commission. He has business interests in the leather and construction industries.

Having previously contested and lost the seat of the Member of Parliament for Kajiado North in 2002, Manje was finally successful in the 2013 Kenyan General Elections that were held on 4 March 2013. He was reelected for a second term in the 2017 Kenyan General Elections.

== Early life and education ==
Manje was born on 20 October 1962 in Kiserian, Kajiado County. His parents were Moses Manje and Veronica Manje. As a young boy, he was involved in helping his family to farm as well as herding of goats and cattle.

He began his education at Kiserian Primary School before transferring to Nkoroi Primary School (now Arap Moi Primary School). After sitting for his primary school examinations, he joined Olekejuado Secondary School and later Njiiris High School for his A - levels.

After completing his secondary school education, Manje joined Kenya Science Teachers College where he trained as a teacher.

== Teaching and business career ==
Manje served as a high school teacher as an employee of the Teachers Service Commission from 1986 to 1992. His stint as a teacher was underscored by his return to his former school Olekejuado High School as a Mathematics teacher. He also served as a Commissioner at the Teachers Service Commission (TSC) from 2005 to 2011.

Manje also pursued business with his major interests being in the leather industry. He served as a Manager at both Manyatta Hides and Skins (1992 - 2002) and Nannet Limited, a construction company. During the General Elections of 2002, he served as the South Rift Presidential Election Zonal Coordinator for the Electoral Commission of Kenya (ECK). He is involved in the leather industry through the operation of a franchise by the name Manje Leather.

== Political career ==
Manje first political attempt was during the 2007 Kenyan General Elections where he faced off with the former Member of Parliament for Kajiado North Constituency and the 6th Vice-President of Kenya George Saitoti.

Following the death of the sitting Member of Parliament George Saitoti in a helicopter crash in 2012, Manje sought to contest for the vacant position in Kajiado North Constituency in the subsequent by-election via The National Alliance party ticket. He later withdrew his candidature in support of Moses ole Sakuda in the party's (TNA) nomination elections.

After losing the first attempt at the seat in 2007, he contested again in 2013 on a The National Alliance (TNA) party ticket. He garnered 43,199 votes out of the 81,075 votes cast which translated to over 50% of the votes. He beat six other candidates with the Orange Democratic Movement (ODM) candidate coming second with 20,561 votes.

In 2017, Manje presented himself as a candidate in the Jubilee Party primaries seeking a ticket to contest for a second term. The nomination process was marred with irregularities allegations. He waded off stiff competition to clinch the Jubilee Party nomination and contested in the year's Kenyan General Elections(2017). He defended his seat garnering 63,595 votes.

On 14 August 2014, he was caught in a violent confrontation between protesters and Kenya Police officers in Ngong. He was injured during the melee and was consequently admitted to Karen Hospital before he was flown to India for further treatment.

On 30 October 2021, Manje was unveiled as a running mate to David ole Nkedianye for the Kajiado County gubernatorial race in the 9th August 2022 Kenyan General Elections.
