= Rombo, Kenya =

Rombo
- Location within Kenya
- Coordinates: 2.9°S 37.8°E
- Country: Kenya
- County: Kajiado County
- Sub County: Loitokitok
- ROMBO Ward: 2010

Population (2019)
  - Total: Estimated 56,783
- 15,498 registered voters
- Time zone: UTC+3 (EAT)

Rombo is a settlement in Kenya's Kajiado County. It is a division in the Loitokitok sub county. It borders Tanzania to the south and Illasit town to the west and Taveta to the south east.

Rombo is an agricultural dependent region. Agriculture is difficult due to the semi-arid climate which does not favor farming, but irrigation is practiced through small irrigation schemes such as Kisioki irrigation scheme, Njoro and others. There are some non governmental organizations which work to help the Masai community who are pastoralists.
