= Ongata Rongai =

Town in Kajiado County, Kenya

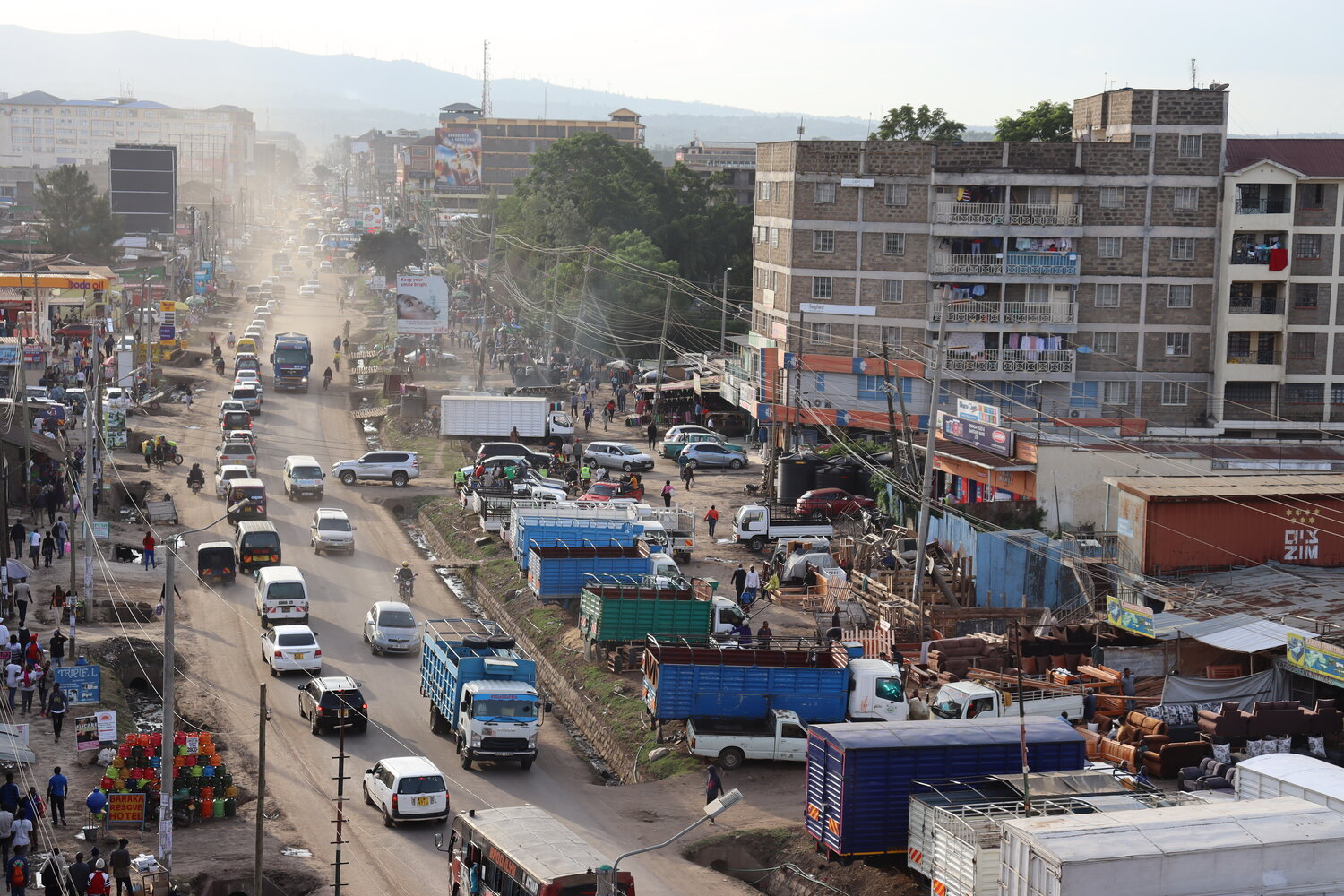
- View of Ongata Rongai from a local arcade

- Location within Kenya
- Coordinates: 1.4°S 36.77°E
- Country: Kenya
- County: Kajiado County

Population (2019)
  - Total: 172,570
- Time zone: UTC+3 (EAT)

Ongata Rongai (also known as Ronga in local slang) is a town located in Kajiado North, Kajiado County, Kenya. The town is situated 17 km (10.6 mi) south of the Nairobi CBD, East of the Ngong hills, and within the greater Nairobi Metropolitan Region. It lies 1,731 meters (5,682 feet) above sea level. According to the 2019 Census, it is the most populous town in Kajiado County and eleventh largest urban centre by population in Kenya.

Known locally as Rongai or simply Ronga, the populated town is a fast-growing community with an approximate population of 172,590.

== History ==
Historically occupied by the Maasai community, the name Ongata Rongai is a Maasai phrase which translates to "narrow plains". Present-day Ongata Rongai grew from a meeting of a cattle market in the northernmost tip of Kajiado county and the quarry township in present-day Kware. The cattle market and the quarry spread rapidly and joined in the late 1950s. Due to rapid real estate development starting in the 1990s, Ongata Rongai has evolved into a high-population Nairobi suburb covering around 16 square kilometres. Greater Ongata Rongai is a medium-to-low population area. The neighborhoods of Kandisi, Rimpa, Nkoroi, Merisho, Olekasasi, Tuala, Rangau and Maasai Lodge are located to the south and east of Ongata Rongai. Ongata Rongai has a diverse population due to its proximity to Nairobi. Ethnic communities represented include Kalenjin, Maasai, Kikuyu, Kamba, Luhya, Luo and Kisii. One of Rongai's oldest founders is Olekyalosingi.

== Education ==
Ongata Rongai is home to a number of institutions of higher learning, such as the Africa Nazarene University, Eagle Air Aviation College, Belmont International College (located at the junction of Magadi/Gataka road in Ongata Rongai Town), Adventist University of Africa, Nairobi Institute of Business Studies (NIBS College) and the nearby Multimedia University of Kenya in Mbagathi. Other learning institutions are Ongata Academy, Laiser Hill Academy, Ongata Royal Academy, Azuri School Ltd Nkaimurunya Secondary School, Prime Junior School, Nakeel Primary, Nakeel Boys, Arap Moi Primary, Olekasasi Mixed School, and Maxwell Adventist Academy, which together with the Adventist University sit on the property of the headquarters of the Seventh-day Adventist Church for the East-Central African Division. There is also St. Mary's Primary School, Olerai School, P.C.E.A Educational Centre and the latest school in the region, The Champions Academy located at House of Grace Church Ongata Rongai; 300 meters from Laiser Hill School.

However the education sector in the area has been hit hard by the forceful subdivision of school land in order for the government to construct the affordable housing project. This move has highly disappointed the locals especially the founders of the Ongata Rongai town whose parents donated the lands for schools and hospital purpose. The affordable housing project marked the end of the long time Japanese funded Matumaini Children's Home. The project will also affect and end the Oloolaiser Water purification plant which has its water collection dam on site bearing in mind that there is no sewerage system in the area

== Cuisine ==
Ongata Rongai serves as a primary entry point where most fresh produce is transported directly to the towns from the farms. It has a major market for fresh produce around the area of Kware known as Soko Mjinga. The large number of butcheries across Ongata Rongai also bear testimony to the popularity of meat and precisely nyama choma. Sellers of fresh fish are also making their presence felt, citing its immense benefits to the health of consumers.

== Urban culture ==
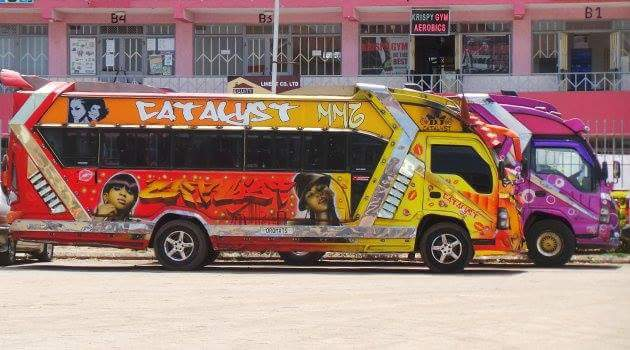
Catalyst Best Matatu in Kenya at Nganya Awards 2016 and Hulla Oop.

Rongai is popular for its pimped matatus. Matatus are the main mode of public transport in most urban areas in Kenya. Matatus in Nairobi are identified by a route number. The route number for Rongai is 125 and they operate from a terminus in Nairobi CBD along Moi Avenue next to the Haille Selassie roundabout. Rongai matatus are very colorful and are decorated with graffiti representing the latest or popular pop culture: artists, brands or anything trending. The interior is decorated with flashy lights, multiple TV screens, and speakers that entertain the commuters with very loud music. There is also free WIFI onboard and mobile charging ports.

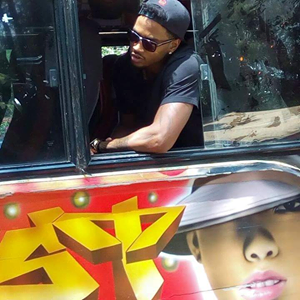
American RnB singer Trey Songz riding in a rongai matatu when he visited Nairobi in 2016.

Some popular matatus that have operated in Rongai are: Catalyst (which won the Best Matatu of the year at Nganya Awards 2016), Boombox, Bond 007, Shakur, Bumblebee, Batman and Superman, Emperor, Amaru, Phantom, Moneyfest e.t.c. Rongai also won the best route at the Nganya Awards event.

== Climatic conditions ==
Summers are usually overcast and winters are generally cloudy; summers are rarely warm. Winters are brief and cool.

=== Temperature ===
With a positive trend indicating warmer weather and a negative trend indicating colder weather, Ongata Rongai's temperature trend reflects the ongoing climate change.

== Sports ==
The town has several sports grounds like Nakeel Stadium which is an arena for Men and women's football. The stadium is still under renovation.

There is amateur boxing, taekwondo, judo and kungfu at the social hall. However, there is a shortage of equipment for these combat sports. Fitness facilities are available as are several fields for jogging and other outdoor fitness.

== Human–wildlife conflict ==
Rongai, located on the southern outskirts of Nairobi near Nairobi National Park, has experienced increasing human–wildlife conflict in recent years, particularly involving large predators such as lions. The area lies along important wildlife dispersal corridors linking the park to rangelands in Kajiado County, resulting in frequent interactions between wildlife and human settlements.

Reported incidents in Rongai and surrounding areas include livestock predation, attacks on domestic animals, and occasional threats to human safety. Sightings of lions within residential areas have been documented, raising concerns among residents and local authorities.

The increase in conflict has been attributed to rapid urbanization and population growth in Rongai, which has led to the encroachment of settlements into wildlife habitats and migratory routes. Infrastructure developments, including road construction, have contributed to habitat fragmentation. Additionally, recurrent drought conditions in southern Kenya have reduced prey availability within protected areas, prompting predators to move beyond park boundaries in search of food.

The lack of continuous fencing along sections of Nairobi National Park allows wildlife to move freely into adjacent communities. While this open ecosystem supports ecological connectivity, it also increases the likelihood of conflict in peri-urban areas such as Rongai.

Mitigation measures have included community awareness initiatives, compensation schemes for livestock losses, and efforts to preserve wildlife corridors. Conservation stakeholders continue to seek long-term solutions that balance urban expansion with ecosystem conservation in the greater Nairobi region.

== Environmental issues ==
Ongata Rongai lacks a comprehensive sewage system which has led to notable concerns such as rental apartments discharging untreated sewage along the roadsides. This unregulated practice has resulted in the contamination of both the land and nearby rivers like Mbagathi River.

Due to the discharge of untreated sewage in the town, grievances have risen concerning both odor and aesthetic problems. This significantly impacts the residents' quality of life.

== See also ==
- Githurai
- Kahawa
- Kasarani
- Dandora
- Kiserian
- Kitengela
- Ruiru
