= Joseph Ole Lenku =

Kenyan politician

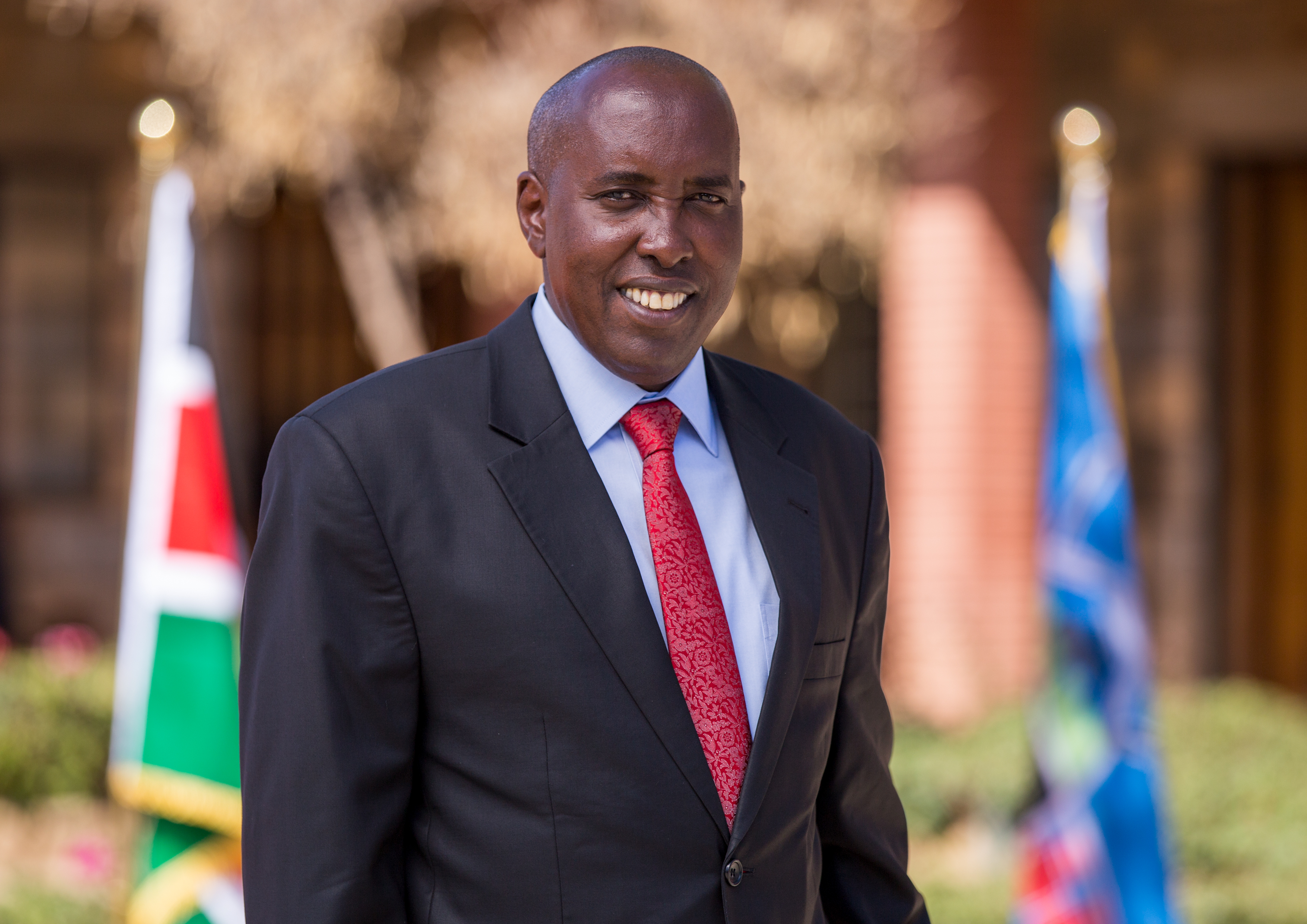
- Governor Joseph Ole Lenku

2nd Governor Kajiado County
- In office 18 August 2017 – 7 August 2022
- President: Uhuru Kenyatta
- Preceded by: David ole Nkedianye

Interior Cabinet Secretary
- In office May 2013 – December 2014
- Preceded by: Katoo Ole Metito
- Succeeded by: Joseph Ole Nkaissery

Personal details
- Born: Joseph Jama Ole Lenku; 20 October 1970 (age 55) Loitokitok, Kajiado District, Kenya
- Spouse: Edna Chelangat Lenku
- Education: University of Nairobi (MBA, BCom); Kenya Utalii College (diploma)
- Occupation: Politician

Joseph Jama Ole Lenku (born 20 October 1970) is a Kenyan politician who is the second Governor of Kajiado County after winning in the Kenyan General Elections on 8 August 2017 and retained his seat in the 2022 General elections held on 8 August. Lenku was Cabinet Secretary for Interior and Coordination of National Government from 2013 to 2014.

Ole Lenku is a graduate of the University of Nairobi, where he obtained his Master of Business Administration in strategic management and Bachelor of Commerce in Marketing. He has worked in different management positions for various hotels in Kenya and Tanzania.

On 23 May 2013, Ole Lenku was appointed Cabinet Secretary in President Uhuru Kenyatta's cabinet, surprisingly with no experience on security matters, becoming the only Maasai person appointed and the pioneering chief executive of the newly created ministry under Kenya's new constitution. During his first year in office, Ole Lenku steered significant reforms in the security sector, including a robust crack-down on drug trafficking, reforms of the police force and increase in its budget and devolution of security. In the wake of the terrorist attack on the Westgate Mall in September 2013, Lenku spearheaded the rolling out of a new security framework known as "Nyumba Kumi" (ten households) anchored on the larger concept of community policing.

Ole Lenku's appointment came as Kenya was transitioning to a new constitutional dispensation as well as a devolved government. His tenure as Cabinet Secretary has also been met with increased acts of terrorism culminating in the Westgate Mall attack, which left 69 dead and scores of people injured. On 17 June 2014, Lenku dismissed calls for his resignation by the opposition and civil society led by the Law Society of Kenya (LSK). On 25 June 2014, Member of Parliament for Kisumu Central Ken Obura, a member of the Coalition for Reforms and Democracy (CORD) Now National Super Alliance (NASA), gave a notice of the motion to impeach Ole Lenku, who fought back as the motion collapsed when the opposition quickly retreated.

Following repeated Al-Shabaab attacks in Kenya amongst other security lapses, Ole Lenku was dropped from his post on 2 December 2014, with Kenyatta nominating Joseph Ole Nkaissery to replace him.

In August 2017 Joseph ole Lenku was inaugurated as the second Governor of Kajiado County.

== Early life ==
Ole Lenku was born on 20 October 1970 in Lenkisim sub-location, Entonet location in the Loitokitok Division of Kajiado County. He spent his childhood like other Maasai boys in rural areas, herding goats and sheep, running errands and undergoing the necessary ceremonies, rituals and rites of passage in line with Maasai culture. His father Lenku Ole Mpaa Kapei was a senior chief in Kajiado South. A respected leader of the Iterito age-group of the Maasai, he is reputedly one of the wealthiest Maasai leaders with more than 2,000 heads of cattle and a large family. His mother, Sentema Lenku, also hailed from the lineage of a powerful Maasai family. Keton ole Soipei, Lenku's maternal grandfather was second in line in the leadership of Iterito age-group having lost the top position to Kapei. On his father, Joseph Ole Lenku recalls that, "Perhaps the only person who was wealthier than Ole Kapei in the region was Stanley Oloitiptip." (The former Cabinet Minister and revered Maasai political kingpin who died on 22 January 1985). His double pedigree has placed Ole Lenku on the top rack of Maasai leadership, also widely viewed as the youthful leader in line to inherit the mantle of William Ole Ntimama as the community's spokesperson.

== Education and Training ==
In 1979, Ole Lenku was enrolled to the Lenkisim Primary School. Because of the rough and tumble of Kajiado, Ole Lenku had to be moved to three other elementary schools, including Ilbisel Primary School (1980–1981), Nkama Primary School (1982–1983) and D.E.B. Loitokitok (1984–1986), where he excelled in his Certificate of Primary Education (CPE) exams. In 1987, Ole Lenku proceeded to the Nakuru High School, where he attained his Kenya Certificate of Secondary Education in 1990.

After high school, Ole Lenku was admitted to study at Kenyatta University. However, he proceeded to the Kenya Utalii College where he attained a diploma in Hotel Management in 1995. He then proceeded to the University of Nairobi where he graduated in 2006 with a Bachelor of Commerce in Marketing and a Master of Business Administration in Business Administration. He further obtained a certificate in Project Management from Greece Ote Academy and a certificate in Corporate Governance (Centre for Corporate Governance), and has attended many other workshops and conferences on corporate governance, public service and security management.

== Career in Public Management ==
=== Serena Hotels ===
Ole Lenku started his career in corporate sector management immediately after his graduation from the Kenya Utalii College. In 1996, he joined the prestigious Serena Hotels, a chain of luxury resorts, safari lodges and hotels that operates in Eastern Africa (Kenya, Tanzania, Uganda, Rwanda and Mozambique) and in Southern Asia (Afghanistan, Pakistan and Tajikistan). He started off as Assistant Lodge Manager at Lake Manyara Serena Lodge in Tanzania where he served for two years.

In 1998, Ole Lenku was moved to the Serengeti Serena, still in Tanzania. He developed training standards for the food and beverage departments for which he got commendation from the top leadership of Serena Hotels. He returned to Kenya in 1999, joining the Kilaguni Serena Lodge as a Lodge Manager. A year later, he was promoted to General Manager. He served in this corporate management position until 2003 when he joined the elective politics of Kajiado South.

In 2003, following the death of Kajiado South Member of Parliament Geoffrey Mepukori Parpai, Ole Lenku vied for the seat on the National Rainbow Coalition (NARC) ticket, but lost the nomination to Katoo Ole Metito. After the by-election, Ole Lenku resumed his corporate management career in the hospitality and tourism industry. In 2004, he was appointed General Manager of the David Livingstone Safari Resort, a five-star lodge in the Maasai Mara He served in this capacity until 2005 when he left the corporate sector and joined public service.

=== Kenya Utalii College ===
In 2005, Ole Lenku joined government service, serving in the tourism and hospitality industry as the General Manager of Kenya Utali College, a state-owned corporation designed as the country's centre of excellence in technical training in the tourism and hospitality industry.

In 2006, Ole Lenku chaired a team that forged a partnership framework between the college and the Kenya Commercial Bank (KCB), enabling it to run the bank's Karen Leadership Centre. Moreover, between 2006 and 2009, Ole Lenku oversaw the execution of another partnership framework which enabled the Kenya Utalii College to manage the hospitality operations of the Kenya School of Monetary Studies. He served at the college until May 2013, when President Uhuru Kenyatta appointed him as the Cabinet Secretary for Interior and Coordination of National Government.

== Cabinet Secretary ==
President Uhuru Kenyatta appointed Ole Lenku as Cabinet Secretary for Interior and Coordination of National Government on 23 May 2013, becoming the third minister in the security docket to come from Kajiado County, after George Saitoti and Katoo Ole Metito. Like many of his predecessors in the security department, such as John Michuki, Saitoti and Ole Metito, Ole Lenku did not have a background or training in security prior to his appointment. Critics, mainly in opposition, cited his training in hotel management and lack of prior background in security matters to demand for his sacking.

Upon his appointment, Ole Lenku initiated police reforms focused on putting in place the relevant new structures and laws, dealing with the general resistance to reforms within the police service, speedy implementation of the new reforms, and dealing with the high corruptibility of police officers, inadequate management, supervision and monitoring of the force and lack of reasonable and transparent standards of vetting police recruits and those in service. The reforms have been internationally hailed as more successful than many thought. The Foreign Policy magazine noted that Kenya "has actually made substantial—if incomplete and fragile—progress on police reform." Under Ole Lenku, the funding for police reforms increased remarkably from Kenya shilling 50 billion (approx. US$586 million) in 2012–13 to Ksh. 67 billion (approx US$784 million) in the 2013–14 budget.

=== Nyumba Kumi Initiative ===
After the September 2013 terrorist attack on Westgate Mall in Nairobi, Ole Lenku spearheaded the Nyumba Kumi (ten households) security initiative aimed at bringing to the door step of individual citizens the mandate to ensure their own safety by knowing a few things about their neighbours as a security strategy to contain insecurity. On 7 October 2013, he announced that the government was working on a framework to put in place the Nyumba Kumi initiative across the country. He asked all County Commissioners to embark on its implementation to ensure security is enhanced in most parts of the country. In the same month, he unveiled a committee headed by a former provincial administrator, Joseph Kaguthi, to oversee the implementation of the Nyumba Kumi initiative that requires Kenyans to know at least ten households within their neighbourhood as a way of fighting crime.

The initiative, modelled on the Tanzanian "nyumba kumi" structure, has reported success in formerly insecure areas like Kirinyaga East in central Kenya, but not in places like Lamu at the Coast where gangs have continued to terrorise communities. On 20 November 2013, Ole Lenku was forced to robustly defend the initiative from criticism by the opposition, which termed it unconstitutional.

=== Drug Trafficking ===
July 2013 alone saw high-profile deportation of 24 foreigners believed to be key members of drug cartels operating in Kenya and who had been in the past arrested on narcotic offences. Among those deported were Nigerians Anthony Chinedu and his brother Johnson Obina, whose deportation created a diplomatic crisis when the government of Nigeria held a Kenyan chartered plane, seven crew members and 12 security personnel at the Murtala Muhammed International Airport in Lagos for close to three weeks. In another high-profile case, two South African women, Taran Louise Chukwu and Alicia Coetzer, were arrested and arraigned in court on charges of drug smuggling.

== Kajiado Governor ==
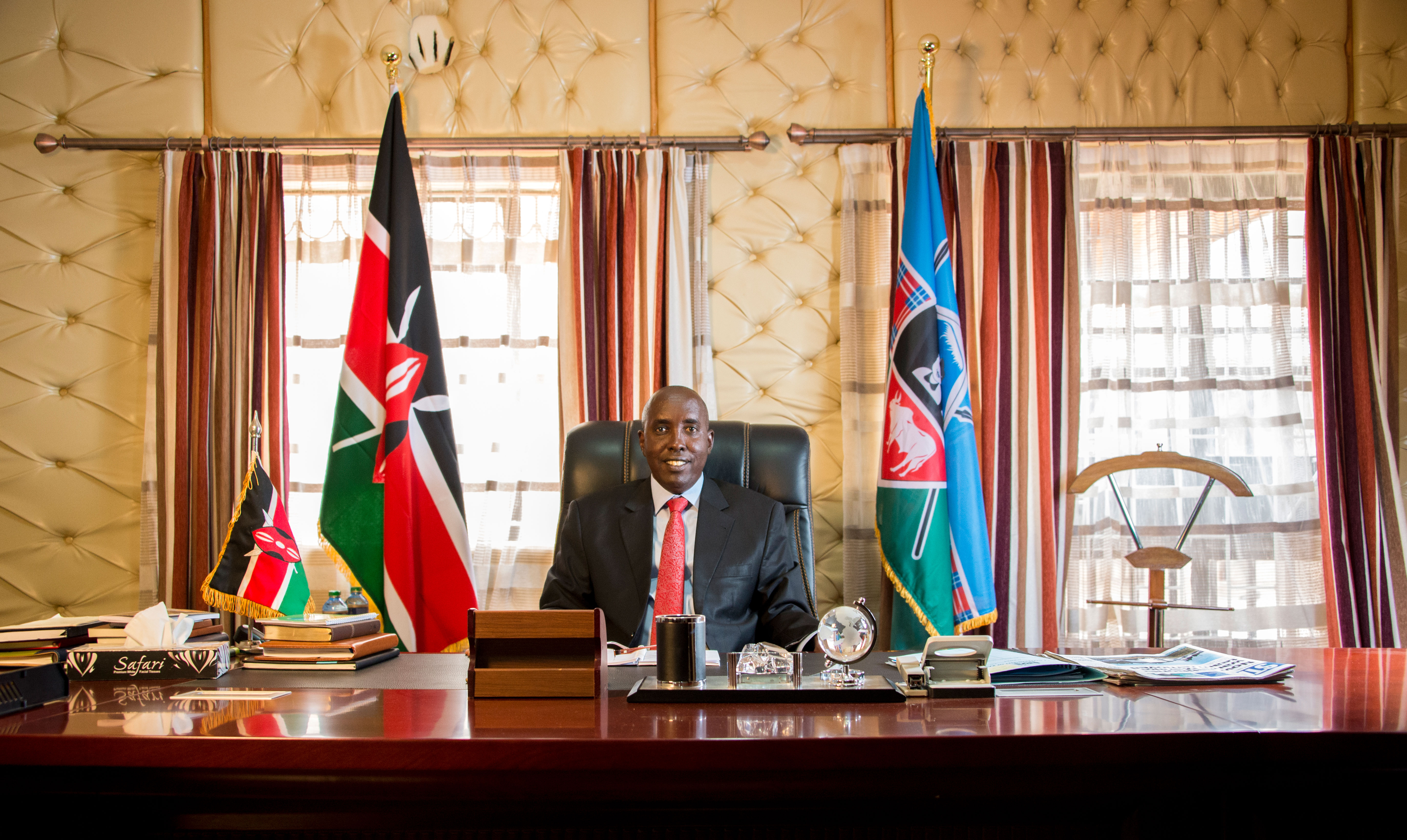

Joseph Ole Lenku assumed the office of the Governor on 8 August 2017. Since taking office he has implemented a series of reforms in the County Government and has focused development efforts in the sectors of Health, Lands and Education.

In the sector of health there are now 227 health facilities across the county and have seen significant improvements in almost all areas since 2017. The Kajiado Referral Hospital now a Level 5 facility complete with a renal unit with 500 patients have benefited from it saving them thousands of money and time they would have otherwise used in the private hospitals. There are 5 functional dialysis machines in the hospital. The new construction of a Maternal Child Health Complex with 2 theaters and wards with a bed capacity of 180 is about to open.

One of the Governor's Flagship Projects is the Mbuzi Moja Afya Bora initiative which sensitizes the community to embrace health insurance as a means of reducing the out of pocket household expenditure. The department targeted 5,000 vulnerable households with an average membership of 5 people per household, bringing the total number of beneficiaries to 25,000 people. 3,512 households were realized during the exercise and this culminated in the auction which was presided over by H.E. the Deputy President where a total of KES 26 million was raised. All those who contributed a goat or paid KES 4,000 were registered and issued with an NHIF card and started benefiting from the insurance cover.

Once a scourge in Kajiado County the lands sector has largely been turned around through a series of reforms and projects. These include the digitization of the land registry, a physical and digital validation of all plots in 28 towns, and the operationalizing a Geographic Information System Lab, the first county in Kenya to do so.

In the Education sector many new ECE centres and classrooms were built, millions of shillings in bursaries distributed, and 67 new ECD teachers employed.

== Criticism ==
=== Westgate Shopping Mall Attack ===
Ole Lenku came under scrutiny as the Cabinet Secretary responsible for internal security after the Westgate Shopping Mall Attack where unidentified gunmen attacked the Westgate shopping mall in Nairobi on 21 September 2013. By 24 September, at least 67 people, including four attackers, were reported killed and 175 others wounded in the mass shooting. On 29 September, Kenya's Foreign Affairs Cabinet Secretary Amina Mohamed told the Public Broadcasting Service (PBS) that there was a woman involved in the attack. "From the information that we have, two or three Americans (were involved) and I think, so far, I have heard of one Brit, a woman, and I think she has done this many times before." This spurned speculation that the woman in question could be Samantha Lewthwaite, also known as the "White Widow", who was wanted by Kenyan police over alleged links with a terrorist cell involved in attacks at the Coast. Ole Lenku disputed the alleged presence of the British terrorist.

Alleged reports of leaked intelligence files also surfaced in Kenyan papers, indicating that Kenya's top security agents knew of an "increasing threat of terrorism" days before the mall was attacked. The reports also alleged that the National Intelligence Service had issued warnings of a possible attack a year before. Ole Lenku declined to answer questions from journalists about possible intelligence failings, stating that intelligence issues were confidential and would not be discussed in public. The number of attackers involved in the attack was also a burning issue, oscillating between 4 and 15. Finally, Ole Lenku ascertained that four gunmen were involved in the killings, and reported that all of them were killed.

After the siege, some quarters called for Ole Lenku's transfer to "a lighter ministry", but the Kenyatta government maintained that Lenku had the requisite management tools to run the ministry.

Several Kenyans heavily criticised Ole Lenku after the crisis. On 5 April 2014, Bemih Kayonge of The Star described him as "gravely misinformed" on matters of national security, adding that ever since it came into power, the Kenyatta government "has shown no respect for the rule of law". A writer at Bubblews called for Ole Lenku's resignation, stating that "there has been increasing insecurity since he stepped into that office."

=== Mpeketoni Attacks ===
Ole Lenku was back on the spotlight again after the 2014 Mpeketoni attacks, when marauding gunmen shot more than 60 people in and around Mpeketoni town in Lamu County between 15 and 17 June. Although the Al-Shabaab militant group claimed responsibility for the attacks, Ole Lenku said that the government was not ruling out a political link in the Mpeketoni attack. A few days later, President Uhuru Kenyatta confirmed the political link stating that "The attack was well planned, orchestrated and politically motivated ethnic violence against the Kenyan community with the intention of victimization for political reasons." Over the next few days, Ole Lenku reiterated the President's message.

Coalition for Reforms and Democracy (CORD) leader Raila Odinga called for Ole Lenku's resignation after the attacks, criticising the cabinet secretary over his statements that linked the attack to politics. The opposition, civil society, Senate and National Assembly representatives also called for Ole Lenku's resignation, citing his ministry's failure to adequately respond to the attacks.

=== Mandera Attacks ===
Criticism against Ole Lenku reached fever pitch when on 22 November 2014 some 28 Kenyans travelling from the Northern town of Mandera were ordered off a bus and killed, with some of the bodies beheaded. Ten days later, on 2 December 2014, another 34 Kenyans who were asleep in a quarry in the outskirts of Mandera town were killed. Al Shabaab militiamen claimed responsibility for both attacks. Kenyans protested on the streets of Nairobi, calling for the removal of Ole Lenku and the Inspector General of Police, David Kimaiyo.

The President succumbed to the pressure and announced that Ole Lenku had been dismissed, while the Inspector General of Police had resigned.

== Personal life ==
After his unsuccessful debut into elective politics in 2003, Ole Lenku ventured into business and farming, and partly because of his cultural status as a leader in the Maasai community, he has kept a relatively large herd of cattle, estimated at 600 animals. He is married to Edna Chelangat Lenku, with whom he has four children.
