= Loitokitok District =

Former district in Kenya

Coordinates: 3°20′S 38°15′E

Loitokitok District was a former district in Kenya. In 2010, it was merged into Kajiado County.

== Location ==
The district was located in Rift Valley Province, in southeastern Kenya, at the border with the Republic of Tanzania, adjacent to Mount Kilimanjaro. The town of Loitokitok where the district maintained its headquarters, lies approximately 255 kilometres (158 mi), by road, southeast of Nairobi, the capital of Kenya and the largest city in that country.

== See also ==
- Loitokitok Airport
