= Keekonyokie =

Kenyan electorate ward

Keekonyokie ward is an electorate ward that was established in 2012 after devolution as per the Kenyan constitution of 2010 and was ranked as number 187 in Kenyan constituencies. Keekonyokie has a population of approximately 33,562 and was devolved from Kajiado North Constituency after devolution. Moses Saoyo became the second MCA (member of county assembly) for keekonyokie after Hon George Sunkuya is the current member of county assembly for Keekonyokie after the 2013 general elections. Keekonyokie is the most dense ward and the smallest in Kajiado West constituency with an area of 807 km^{2} and has Kisamis near Kiserian as the administration centre for the ward.

== Keekonyokie slaughter house ==
The Keekonyokie slaughterhouse is particularly famous due to its innovative strides in the Biogas industry. The Keekonyokie slaughterhouse stores biogas created by the slaughtering of animals in cylinders and sells them at a price about half of that of conventional liquefied petroleum (LP) gas. The Kiserian dam is also situated in the area.

== See also ==
- Ongata Rongai
