= David ole Nkedianye =

Kenyan politician

1st Governor of Kajiado County
- In office 27 March 2013 – 18 August 2017
- Deputy: Paul Ole Ntiati
- Succeeded by: Joseph Ole Lenku

Personal details
- Born: 20 December 1963 (age 62) Kitengela, Kajiado District, Kenya
- Party: Orange Democratic Movement
- Education: University of Nairobi

David Ole Nkedianye (born 20 December 1963) is a Kenyan politician who served as the 1st governor of Kajiado County. Nkedianye won the Kajiado county 2013 gubernatorial elections closely defeating Parantai Moses of the Democratic Party (Kenya).

In 2017, while defending his gubernatorial seat in an ODM ticket, Ole Nkedianye lost the elections to Jubilee party's Joseph Jama Ole Lenku.

Ole Nkedianye has previously served as a community facilitator for International Livestock Research Institute helping in the provision of breeding bulls for farmers in pastoral regions in Kajiado, Kenya.

Born in Kitengela, Kajiado County. Nkedianye is a graduate of the University of Nairobi and holds a PhD in Pastoralism land-use and conservation from the University of Edinburgh. Nkedianye also hold a Bachelor of Education in Social education and ethics from the Catholic University of East Africa.
