= Fred Matiang'i =

Kenyan politician

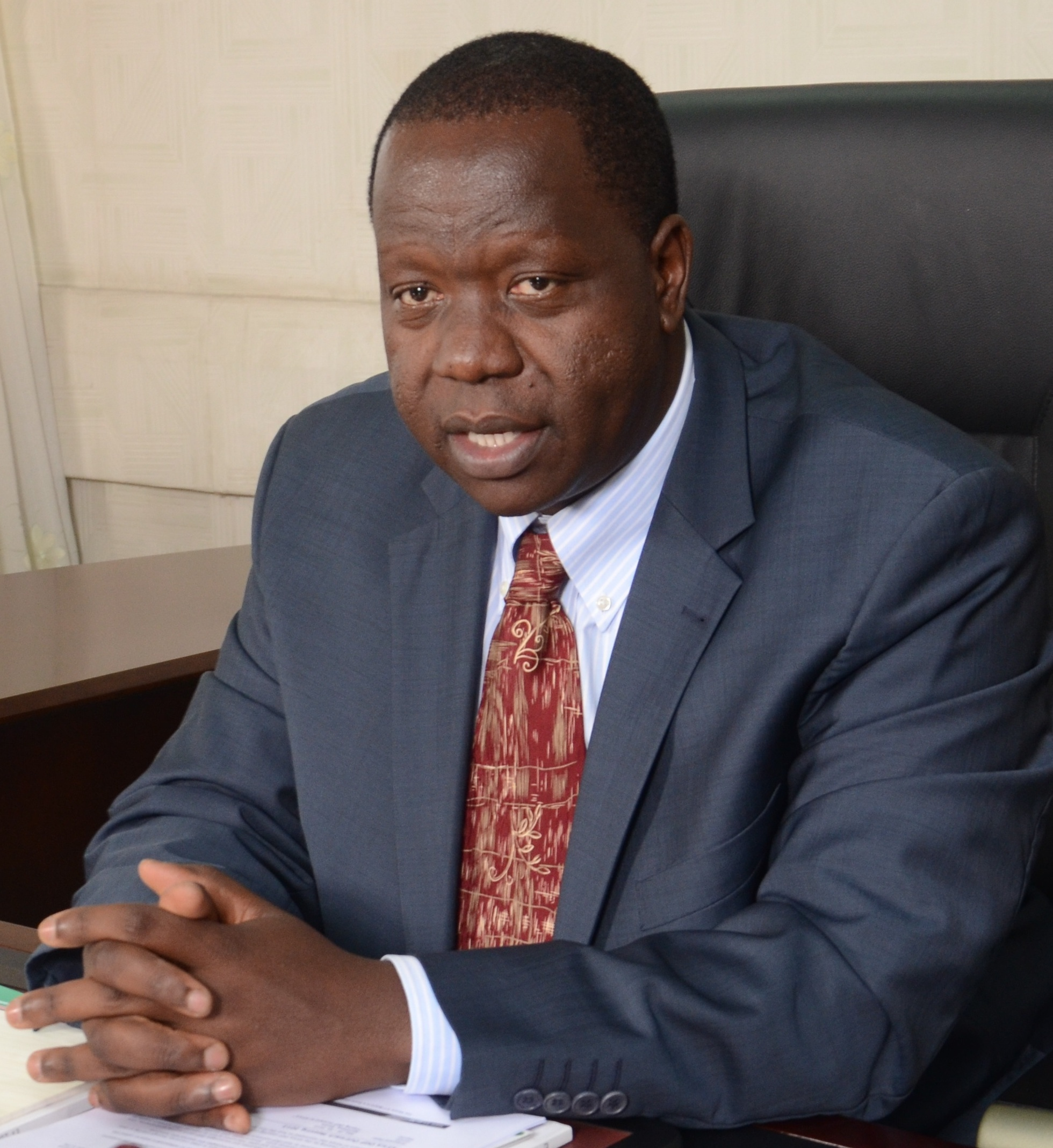
- Matiang'i in 2013

Cabinet Secretary, Ministry of Interior & Coordination of National Government
- In office 8 July 2017 – 27 October 2022
- President: Uhuru Kenyatta
- Preceded by: Joseph Ole Nkaissery
- Succeeded by: Kithure Kindiki

Cabinet Secretary for Education, Science and Technology
- In office 24 November 2015 – 26 January 2018
- President: Uhuru Kenyatta
- Preceded by: Jacob Kaimenyi
- Succeeded by: Amina Mohamed

Cabinet Secretary for Information, Communications and Technology
- In office April 2013 – 24 November 2015
- President: Uhuru Kenyatta
- Succeeded by: Joe Mucheru

Personal details
- Born: Fred Okengo Matiang'i Kisii District, Nyanza Province, Kenya
- Children: 2
- Education: Kenyatta University (BA); University of Nairobi (MA), (PhD)

Fred Okengo Matiang'i is a Kenyan academic and former Cabinet Secretary who served in various high-profile dockets under the administration of President Uhuru Kenyatta. He served as the Cabinet Secretary for the Ministry of Interior and Coordination of National Government from 2017 to 2022, a tenure characterized by a "super-minister" status following a 2019 executive order that granted him oversight over all cabinet sub-committees. While credited with implementing stringent reforms in the education and security sectors, his time in office was often marked by friction with the Judiciary of Kenya and criticism from human rights organizations regarding the expansion of executive power and the use of state security apparatus against political opponents.

His tenure at the Ministry of Interior was under scrutiny due to the repeated disregard for judicial mandates; including the defiance of ten separate High Court orders to facilitate the return of lawyer Miguna Miguna, resulting in a 2018 ruling by Justice George Odunga finding Matiang'i in contempt of court for defiance of the judiciary. Additionally, the ministry delayed the restoration of broadcasting signals for Citizen TV, KTN, and NTV in early 2018 despite a High Court injunction, and oversaw mass evictions in Kariobangi and Ruai during the COVID-19 pandemic in violation of humanitarian stay orders.

== Career ==
=== University Lecturer ===
He formerly taught at Egerton University and the University of Nairobi.

=== Rockefeller College of Public Affairs and Policy ===
Prior to his entry into the Cabinet, Matiang'i served as the Eastern Africa Regional Representative for the Centre for International Development at the Rockefeller College of Public Affairs and Policy, State University of New York (SUNY). In this capacity, he oversaw various programs aimed at strengthening legislative institutions and parliamentary processes across the East African region. His tenure at Rockefeller College concluded in April 2013, following his nomination as the Cabinet Secretary for Information, Communication and Technology (ICT) in the first administration of President Uhuru Kenyatta.

=== Cabinet Secretary for Education ===
On 24 November 2015, President Uhuru Kenyatta appointed Matiang'i as the Cabinet Secretary for Education, Science and Technology in a major cabinet reshuffle. He moved to the education docket after a brief stint in an acting capacity at the Ministry of Lands. His appointment coincided with a period of significant public concern regarding massive leakages in the Kenya Certificate of Secondary Education (KCSE) national examinations.

Upon assuming office, Matiang'i initiated a radical overhaul of the Kenya National Examinations Council (KNEC), dismissing several senior officials and restructuring security protocols for exam handling. Key policies implemented during his tenure to eliminate cheating and systemic delays included:

- Principal accountability: Headteachers and principals were made directly responsible for the security of examination centers, replacing the previous system of county-level oversight.
- Third term restrictions: A ban was placed on social activities, including prayer days and visiting days, during the third term to minimize contact between candidates and external parties.
- Compressed timeline: The duration of the KCSE examinations was reduced from six weeks to four.
- Expedited processing: The turnaround time for releasing national examination results was shortened from three months to one month, a move designed to reduce the window for potential result alteration by corrupt officials.

These reforms earned him widespread national accolades and established his reputation for administrative efficiency and reformist leadership within the Executive.

==== Relationship with Teacher's Unions ====
Matiangi's relationship with KNUT and KUPPET was generally seen as a complicated one. This was due to the "bulldozing" nature of Matiangi while working in the ministry of education. After the results on the 2016 KCSE the Kenya National Union of teachers demanded a forensic audit of the examination results after a dismal performance led to quite a steep decline in the number of students achieving top grades. This was though attributed to the hard hitting changes that Matiangi had introduced to the ministry less than a year after joining it.

==== Cabinet Secretary for Interior and Coordination of National Government ====
Following the death of Joseph Ole Nkaissery on 8 July 2017, Matiang'i was appointed in an acting capacity as the Cabinet Secretary for Interior and Coordination of National Government. This appointment saw him hold two cabinet portfolios concurrently, including his existing role in the Ministry of Education. His elevation to the security docket was attributed by analysts to his reputation as a "fix-it man" for the President, following his successful management of the contentious digital television migration at the Ministry of ICT and his widely praised reforms to secure national examinations at the Ministry of Education.

In January 2018, President Uhuru Kenyatta confirmed Matiang'i as the substantive Cabinet Secretary for Interior during his second-term cabinet appointments. His executive influence expanded significantly on 22 January 2019, when Executive Order Number 1 of 2019 appointed him chairperson of the National Development Implementation and Communication Cabinet Committee. In this role, he oversaw all Cabinet Secretaries, the Attorney-General, and the Head of Public Service, leading the media to characterize him as a "Super Cabinet Secretary" with powers effectively second only to the President and Deputy President.

Matiangi received general public backlash over the government's decision to shut down media houses during the swearing-in of Raila Odinga by his supporters as the People's president. On the day of the swearing in, 3 radio and television broadcasting stations were switched off by the Communications Authority of Kenya by a directive from the Ministry of Interior. In a televised broadcast the following day, Matiangi indicated that the broadcasting stations would remain off for the better part up until they had completed investigations into some people that he accused of being complicit in actions that would have led to the deaths of innocent Kenyans due to the buildup of incitement that was witnessed in the early hours of the morning of 30 January 2018

===== (2017–2018) post-election crisis and opposition crackdown =====
Matiangi while occupying one of the highest dockets a public civil servant can hold, has not been short of conflicts with the opposition. During the 2017 Kenya presidential election, Matiangi took a hard stance against the opposition protests aimed at the Independent Electoral and Boundaries Commission. His ministry, of which the national police falls under would clash with the opposition violently during their demonstrations.

Following the unofficial "swearing-in" of opposition leader Raila Odinga in January 2018, Matiang'i formally outlawed the National Resistance Movement (NRM), the activist wing of the NASA coalition, by gazetting it as an organized criminal group under the Prevention of Organized Crimes Act. In a subsequent government statement, the Cabinet Secretary characterized the events at Uhuru Park as a "well-choreographed attempt to subvert or overthrow the legally constituted Government of the Republic of Kenya." Matiang'i further alleged that the NRM's activities posed a significant threat to national security, using this justification to launch a crackdown on opposition figures and the media houses that had broadcast the event.

Following his press briefing, officers from the Flying Squad picked up some individuals aligned to the opposition and some media personalities for questioning regarding their association with the swearing in of Raila Odinga the day before. The individuals picked up were Member of Parliament for Ruaraka TJ Kajwang, Miguna Miguna, Linus Kaikai and Larry Madowo.

== Controversies ==
=== Disregard for court orders and Miguna Miguna deportation ===
During his tenure as Cabinet Secretary for Interior, Matiang'i was accused by the judiciary and legal activists of undermining the rule of law through the persistent defiance of court orders, this was seen in 2018 during the detention and subsequent deportation of lawyer and activist Miguna Miguna. the Ministry of Interior oversaw his forced removal to Dubai and later Canada despite multiple High Court orders directing the government to release Miguna and allow his re-entry into Kenya. In 2018, High Court Judge George Odunga found Matiang'i in contempt of court and imposed a personal fine, citing defiance of the judiciary. In September 2025, the Court of Appeal overturned this contempt verdict, ruling that the High Court had failed to follow proper due process during the original conviction. Matiang'i defended his stance by alleging that judges were sympathizing with criminals and undermining national security. The Law Society of Kenya argued that this rhetoric and the non-enforcement of orders created a "constitutional crisis" that eroded the separation of powers.

=== 2017 elections and 2018 media and internet shutdown ===
During the 2017 general elections, Matiang'i faced international condemnation from Human Rights Watch and Amnesty International for overseeing a violent crackdown on opposition protesters that resulted in dozens of deaths, including a six-month-old infant. Although he characterized the victims as "criminal elements", the Kenya National Commission on Human Rights (KNCHR) documented systemic police brutality and the use of lethal force under his Interior docket.

In January 2018, following the unconstitutional swearing-in of opposition leader Raila Odinga, Matiang'i's ministry directed the Communications Authority of Kenya to shut down three of the country's largest private television stations—NTV, KTN News, and Citizen TV. Matiang'i defended the shutdown by alleging that the media houses were complicit in a plot to "subvert and overthrow" the government. The stations remained off-air for several days, directly defying a High Court order that suspended the shutdown and mandated the immediate restoration of signals. Human rights groups labeled this as an unprecedented assault on press freedom in Kenya's post-2010 constitutional era.

=== IDP compensation ===
Matiang'i was implicated in financial fraud concerning a KSh 6.85 billion fund intended for the compensation of Internally Displaced Persons (IDPs) in Kisii and Nyamira counties. In late 2024, a lawsuit was filed in the Kisii High Court accusing Matiang'i and other senior officials of diverting these resettlement funds.

=== Human rights and River Yala controversy ===
Reports of police brutality and extrajudicial killings occurred during his tenure as Interior CS. In 2021 and 2022, the discovery of dozens of unidentified bodies in River Yala sparked national outrage. Human rights groups and some lawmakers held Matiang'i's ministry responsible for overseeing a period of heightened police violence: He has distanced himself from the scandal. In July 2025, Matiang'i called for a public inquest into the killings, asserting that he did not interfere with police investigations and had left an open investigation file upon exiting government.

=== Ruaraka land controversy ===
Matiang'i was an implicated in the Ruaraka land scandal, where a parliamentary committee recommended his prosecution for the loss of KSh 1.5 billion used to purchase land for two public schools that was allegedly already public property. While he denied any wrongdoing, the Ethics and Anti-Corruption Commission (EACC) named him as a person of interest for allegedly ignoring quality assurance reports before authorizing the compensation.

== Presidential Ambition ==
He is currently eyeing for the Presidential seat in 2027 general elections in Kenya.

== See also ==
- David Maraga
- Education in Kenya
- George Magoha
