= Kiserian Dam =

Water catchment project In Kenya

Coordinates: 1.4379°S 36.6965°E

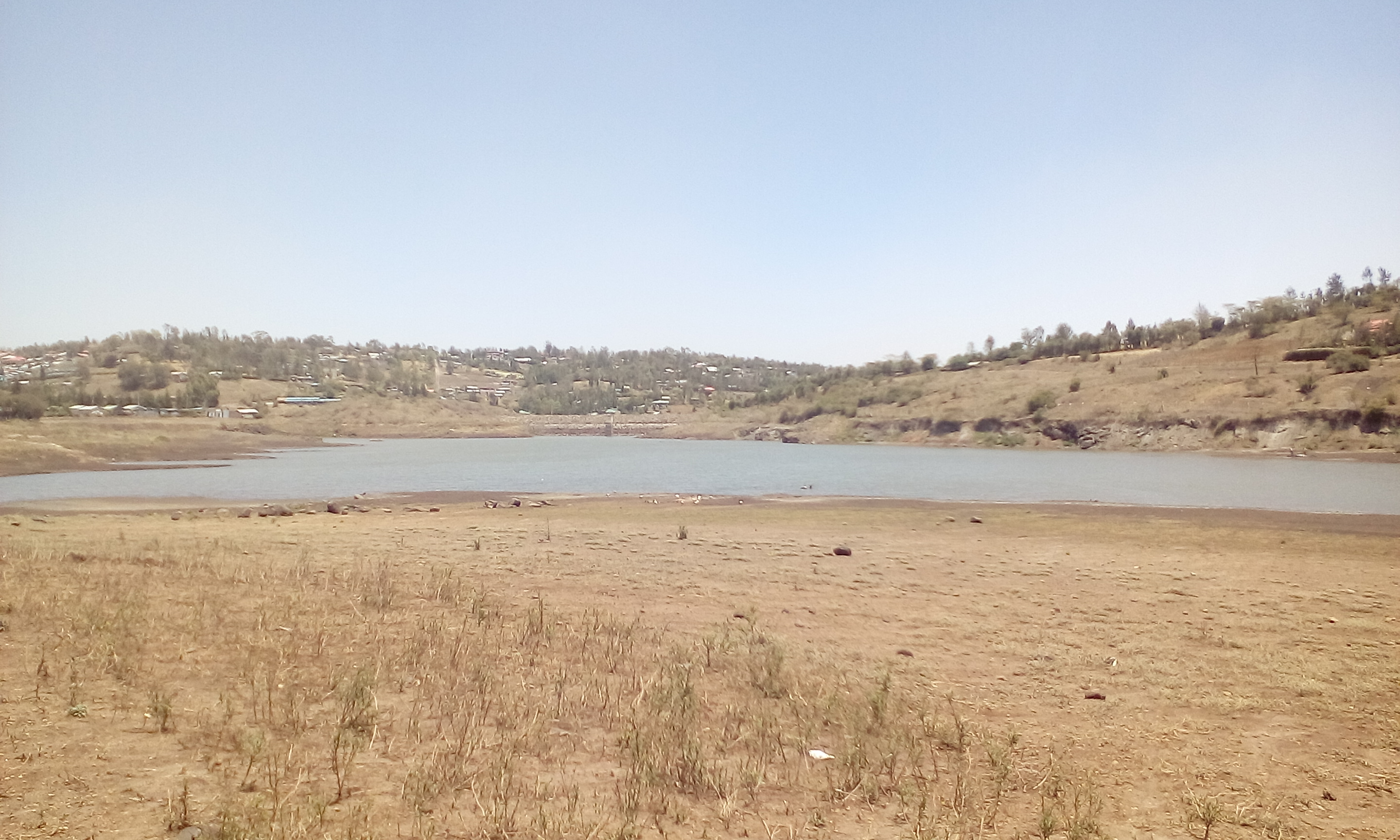
Kiserian dam view from the horn of the dam

Kiserian Dam is a water catchment project by the government of Kenya located along the Kiserian River about 2 km from Kiserian Town, Keekonyokie Ward.

The dam construction started in 2008 and ended in 2013. The dam has a height of 18 metres and a capacity of 1.8 million litres. The dam has a water treatment storage of 5000 m³ and was intended to serve over 253,000 residents. However, the dam cannot be used as it was poorly constructed and sited at a wrong location. It is currently of no benefit to residents. Kiserian dam relies on four seasonal rivers, two of which originate from Ngong Hills.

This project was set up in order to overcome water challenges in Kajiado county and parts of Nairobi county by supplying 15,700 cubic metres of domestic water. It is under maintenance by Oloolaiser Water and Sewage Company who are also in charge of water and sewage treatment and supply.

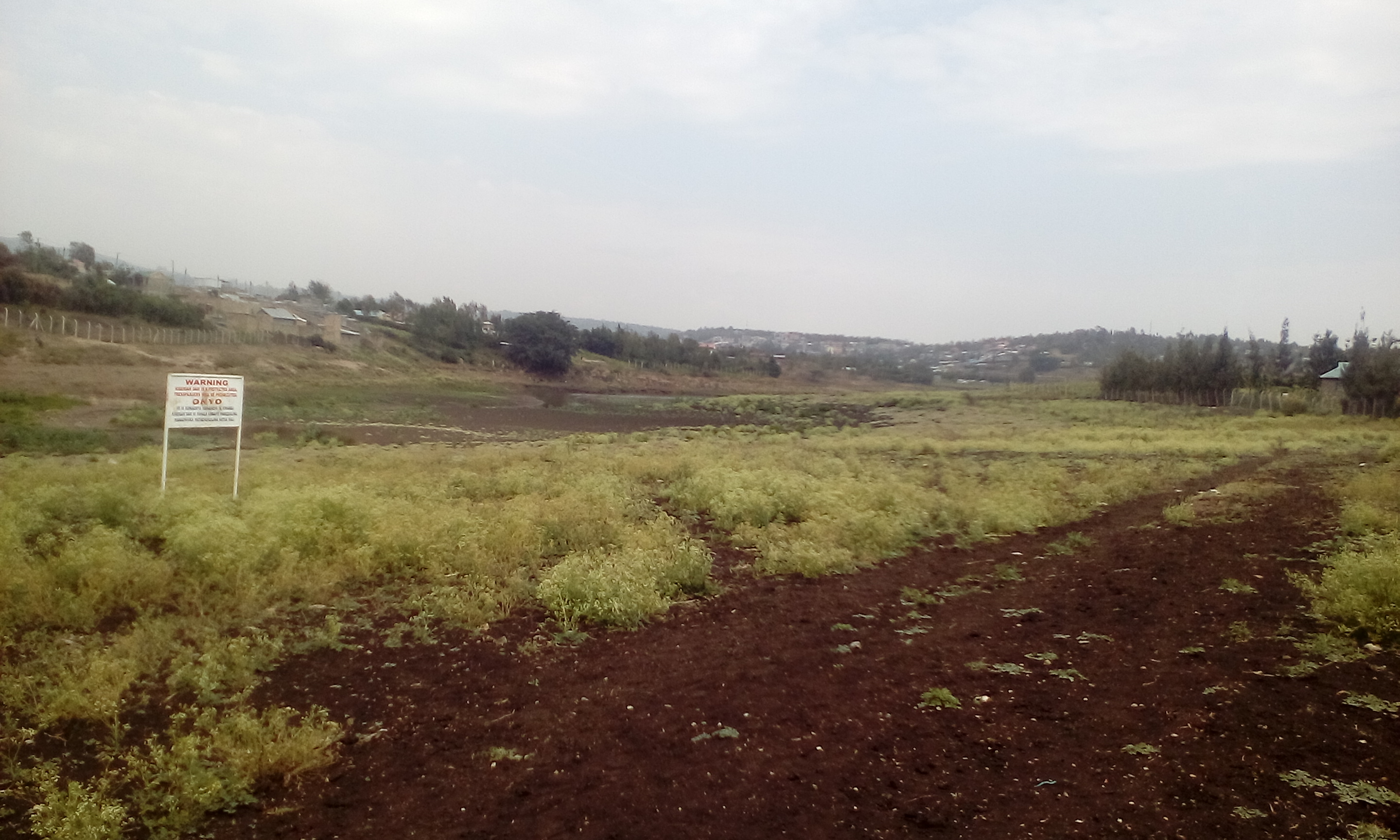
This image shows a part of Kiserian Dam when dry.

== See also ==
- Kiserian
- Keekonyokie ward
- Ngong Hills
