= Oluyemi Adetiba-Orija =

Nigerian Criminal lawyer and founder of Headfort Foundation

- Born: c. 1989
- Education: Ekiti State University
- Occupation: Lawyer
- Employer: Headfort Foundation
- Known for: Pro-bono legal services

Oluyemi Adetiba-Orija (born 1989) is a Nigerian criminal lawyer and founder of Headfort Foundation, which offers pro-bono legal services. She was named as one of the BBC's 100 inspiring women in 2021.

== Life ==
Adetiba-Orija was born in about 1989. She graduated in law in 2012 from Ekiti State University.

She founded the Headfort Foundation that is made up of women who offers free legal services in 2018.

She is concerned about the large number of people in prison. Many are there awaiting trial or for minor charges. The law requires that those who are arrested must be charged within 48 hours but these laws are frequesntly ignored. The police can made up charges because of prejudice or to encourage people to bribe them. Some people who are accused stay on remand. They are not able to probe their innocence because the police are granted an adjournment without the case being tested. Even those who are finally found not guilty can find their reputation and finances ruined.

In 2021, the annual list of the BBC's 100 inspiring women was announced and Adetiba-Orija was included together with the writer Chimamanda Ngozi Adichie and Kenyan YouTuber Lynn Ngugi. It was estimated that the four women employed at Headfort had represented over 120 people in court pro bono. Many of these were under-age. Adetiba-Orija's team regularly visit Ikoyi Prison, where they take on up to 30 non-capital offences. Some of those in prison are not aware that they can be given bail because they cannot afford a lawyer to tell them that this is their right.
