= Kiserian =

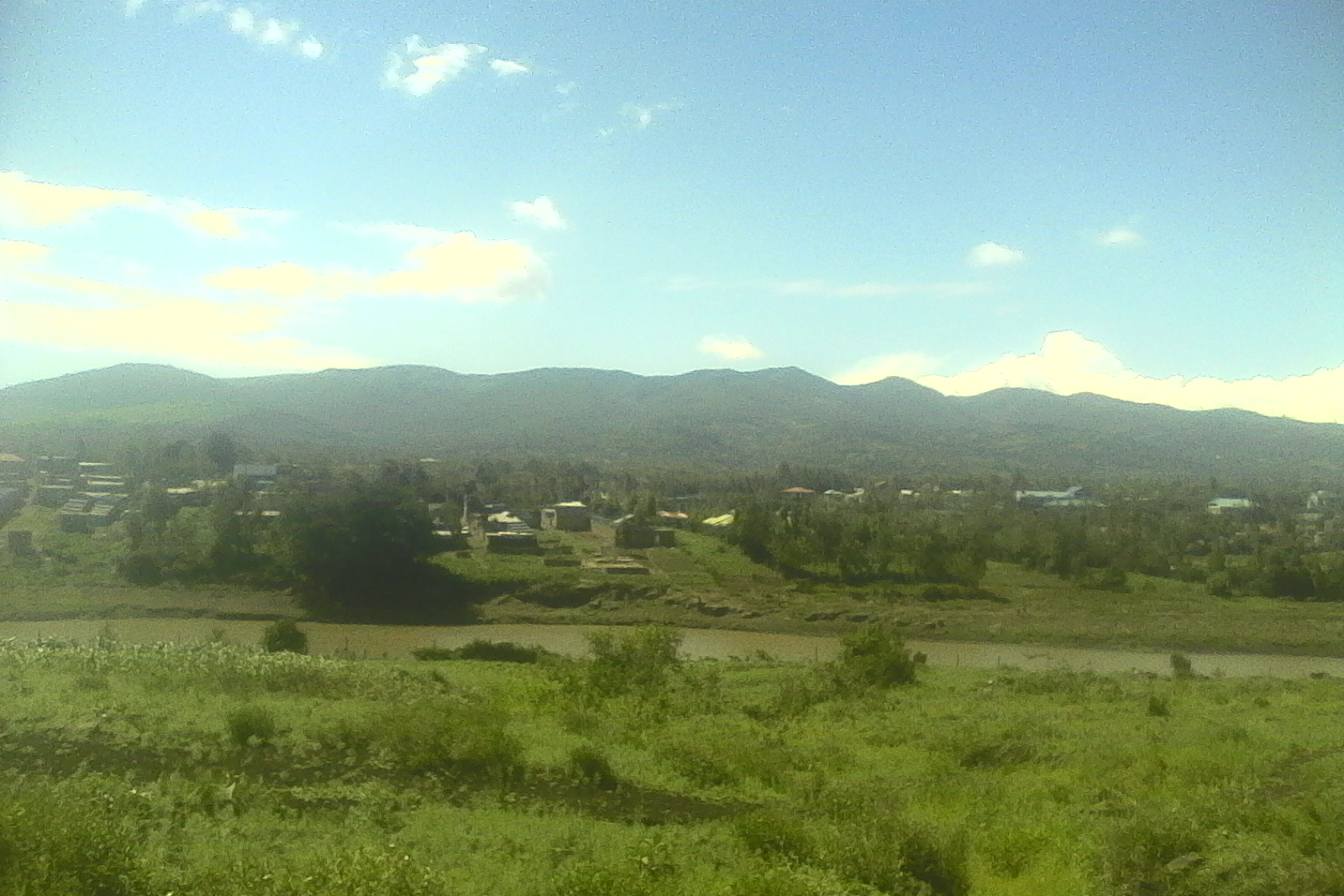

- Location within Kenya
- Coordinates: 1.430°S 36.687°E
- Country: Kenya
- Province: Rift Valley Province (formerly)
- County: Kajiado county

Population (2019)
  - Urban: 76,903
- Time zone: UTC+3 (EAT)

Kiserian is a town in Kenya's Rift Valley Province, Kajiado County. Kiserian Town is bordered by Ongata Rongai, Ngong Town, Enoomatasiani Town and Kisamis Town. It is located on the boundary between Kajiado North and Kajiado West constituencies. It lies at the foot of the Ngong Hills, along Magadi Road just adjacent to the Kiserian dam. There is a famous Maasai community around Kiserian town and small Maasai villages called Olteyani and Olooseos. Among other social amenities, Kiserian has several primary schools and secondary schools, and a few higher education institutions. In the language of the Maasai, Kiserian means "a place of peace".

The Keekonyokie slaughter house located in Kiserian Center, just next to the Catholic Church or seminary, serves as an important economic hub for the people of Kiserian and its environs. This is because meat slaughtered from the abattoir is transported to Nairobi city and other towns in Kenya. The Kiserian dam constructed down the river approximately 1 km (0.6 mi) away provides environmental and social benefits to the people of Kiserian town. Kiserian market is also an economic hub; various products get exchanged in the market, notably Maasai chukkas and food stuffs like potatoes, carrots, and cabbages that get transported from Narok and other highland places.

One of the major challenges facing Kiserian is its lack of proper roads and a sewerage system.

== See also ==
- Isinya
- Ngong
- Loitokitok
