= Sakuda =

Sakuda is a surname. Notable people with the surname include:

- Kevin Sakuda (born 1980), American soccer player
- Yuji Sakuda (作田 裕次, born 1987), Japanese footballer

== See also ==
- Moses ole Sakuda, Kenyan politician
