= Ebbie Noelle Samuels =

Kenyan girl who was flogged to death

Ebbie Noelle Samuels (born 2003/2004; died 9 March 2019) was a Kenyan girl who was flogged to death by the deputy principal of her school.

Ebbie Samuels attended Gatanga CCM Secondary School, a boarding school in Murang'a County, Kenya. On 9 March 2019, she died under disputed circumstances: the school say she died in her sleep, but witnesses alleged she was beaten by the deputy principal, Elizabeth Wairimu Gtaimu, over how she styled her hair. Ebbie's mother, Martha Wanjiro Samuels, was informed only after Ebbie was taken to the hospital, where she found her daughter already dead.

In 2022, the Director of Criminal Investigations George Kinoti said that school managers had provided the police with false information on what led to Ebbie's death. He said that evidence showed that Ebbie was assaulted by a senior staff member in the evening prior to her death; however, the school told detectives that she had fallen from her bed in the night. The statement also said that the school had created a hostile environment for witnesses giving evidence in the case.

Gtaimu was arrested on a charge of murder in January 2023 and dismissed from teaching by the Teachers Service Commission. Martha Samuels responded on Instagram: "After 1419 DAYS of Praying and waiting. Finally we see Justice's wheels begin to roll. It is Happening. See you in Court!". Gtaimu was charged with murder on 27 April 2023 by the High Court at Kiambu.
