= Lynn Ngugi =

Kenyan journalist and media personality

- Born: Lynn Nyambura Ngugi
- Education: East Africa School of Media Studies
- Occupation: YouTuber
- Employer: Tuko.co.ke (until 2021)
- Known for: Media personality
- Television: Lynn Ngugi Media Network

Lynn Nyambura Ngugi is a Kenyan journalist and media personality. She was one of the BBC's 100 inspiring women, a Commonwealth change ambassador and a campaigning YouTuber.

== Life ==
Lynn grew up in Huruma, which is a low-income residential estate in the north-east of Nairobi. Her father was an abusive husband and after the marriage ended her mother and her three sisters shared a single room in Huruma. Her mother sold shoes and her father stopped supporting his children.

In 2004, she left secondary education and began studying journalism at the East Africa School of Media Studies.

Lynn worked for years in Qatar and Dubai serving coffee, as she found it difficult to get a job in the media. She volunteered to care for cancer patients. In 2011, she began to gain influence on social media, first with Kiwo films and then with the Qatar Foundation. She worked at Tuko until 2021. when she decided to launch her own channel which soon gathered 100,000 subscribers.

Lynn wrote about human interest stories and campaigned for justice - including for Ebbie Noelle Samuels. Ebbie had died as the result of a head injury at her boarding school.

== Recognition ==
- Cafe Ngoma humanitarian journalist of the year award (2020)
- Ambassador for Change for the Commonwealth of Nations (2021).
- BBC list of the 100 most influential women of 2021
- Gender justice champion award by Echo Network Africa (2023)
- Media Personality of the Year by East Africa Women of Excellence (2024).
