= Ngong Hills Forest Reserve =

Protected area in Kenya

- Location within Kenya
- Nearest city: Nairobi
- Coordinates: 1°24′54.3″S 36°38′30.7″E
- Area: 21,105 square kilometres (8,149 mi^{2})
- Elevation: 2,483 meters (8,146 ft) ASL
- Established: 1981; 45 years ago (as a forest reserve)
- Governing body: Kenya Wildlife Service; Kenya Forest Service

Ngong Hills Forest Reserve is the protected area of the larger Ngong Hills, Ngong, Kenya. The reserve is located on the southern tip of the Rift Valley region, 25 kilometres (16 miles) away from Kenya's capital, Nairobi. With the tallest peak standing at an altitude of 2,460 meters (8,070 ft) above sea level, it is the highest point in Ngong.

== History ==
The history of Ngong Hills Forest Reserve dates back to 1981 when it was officially Gazetted by Government of Kenya as a forest reserve.

== Geography ==
The forest reserve is situated on 21,000 km^{2} of an undulating terrain along the knuckle-shaped Ngong Hills. The highest point of the terrain is the Ngong Hills, standing at an altitude of 2,160 km above sea level.

== Climate ==
The climate of the reserve is mainly sub-humid and semi-arid with a patches of humid climate around the Ngong Hills themselves. Short rains occur between October and December while long rains between March and May.

== Biodiversity ==
=== Vegetation ===
The eastern side of the hills are predominated by montane dry forest and wooded grassland while the western side is primarily made of bushlands.

=== Wildlife ===
The wildlife of Ngong Hills Forest Reserve mainly consists of buffaloes, vervets and colobus monkeys, baboons, duikers, bush pigs, water bucks and leopards. Leopards are, however, mostly found in the remnants of the indigenous forest along the river valleys.

== Tourism ==
"A very pretty neighbourhood on the edge of a thick wood behind which dwelt the dreaded people of the Kikuyu, while on the south stretched vast pastures tenanted by the great herds of cattle belonging to the Masai" Lieutenant Ludwig von Hohnel, of the Ngong Hills in 1887

== See also ==
- List of national parks of Kenya
