= John Keen (Kenya politician) =

Kenyan politician (1930–2016)

John Keen was a Kenyan politician. He served as an assistant minister for agriculture and member of parliament (MP) for Kajiado North Constituency from 1969 to 1979. In 1991 together with Mwai Kibaki, he founded the Democratic Party, for which he served as secretary general. He carved a reputation as a defender of the Maasai community's land rights.

== Early life ==
Keen was born to a German-British man and a Samburu woman in Kajiado in 1930. He joined Government African School in Narok in 1937. After completing his studies there, he went to The Alliance High School in Kikuyu. After graduation from Alliance, he joined the British Army regiment in Kenya for a short while.

In 1962 together with, among others, Jomo Kenyatta and Ronald Ngala, he was part of the Kenyan delegation to the second Lancaster House Conference that negotiated for Kenya's independence from British colonial rule. At the conference, Keen pushed for the compensation of Maasai land forcefully taken by British colonialists.

== Post-Independence ==
After independence, Keen was one of the first Kenyans chosen to represent the country in the East African Legislative Assembly in Arusha. In this capacity, he fought for the formation of a union of the three countries into a federalized state on the East African Community. In 1967, Keen was detained and later put behind bars by the Kenyatta administration after he accused him, Tanzania's Julius Nyerere, and Uganda's Milton Obote as being the main obstacles towards the formation of the East African Community.

As a member of KANU, Keen served as the party's national organizing secretary.

== Multi-Party Democracy ==
He was on the forefront of advocating for multi-party democracy, together with Oginga Odinga, Raila Odinga, Kenneth Matiba, Paul Muite, and James Orengo, among others. When section 2A of the Kenyan constitution was repealed allowing the country to be a multi-party state once again, Keen quit KANU and formed the Democratic Party of Kenya together with Mwai Kibaki. He became the party's secretary general while Kibaki became its chairman.

== Personal life ==
Keen was married to four wives and had over ten children. Having been a keen wildlife conservationist all his life, in 2005 he donated 300 acres of his personal land to the Kenya Wildlife Service. KWS named the area after his daughter Silole.

In 2015, Keen was the beneficiary of a multi-million shilling deal when the National Lands Commission bought 89 acres of his personal land to give to the Nairobi National Park as compensation for land it had lost in the construction of the southern bypass.

In 2016, high court judge Mumbi Ngugi dismissed a case in which Ruby Karimi had sued Keen and the Registrar of Births and Deaths to change her name and recognize the former as her father. Karimi relied on an affidavit in which her mother stated that Keen had forced himself on her at a hotel in Namanga in 1980. Justice Ngugi threw the case out citing the fact that Karimi's mother had neither reported the alleged rape to the police, nor had she talked about it to her father or brother whom she lived with.

== Death ==
Keen died on Christmas Day 2016 at the Aga Khan Hospital. He was buried in his home in Namanga
