= 2013 Kajiado local elections =

Local elections in Kenya

Local elections were held in Kajiado County to elect a Governor and County Assembly on 4 March 2013. Under the new constitution, which was passed in a 2010 referendum, the 2013 general elections were the first in which Governors and members of the County Assemblies for the newly created counties were elected.

== Gubernatorial election ==
| Candidate | Running Mate | Coalition | Party | Votes |
|---|---|---|---|---|
| Kimani, Njoroge Obadiah | Tinaayi, Daniel K. | | Party of Action | -- |
| Nina, Daniel Mpute | Gathogo, George Kingori | | United Republican Party | -- |
| Nkedianye, David K. | Ntiati, Paul Mpute | Cord | Orange Democratic Movement | -- |
| Parantai, Moses | Kamau, Patrick Mburu | | Democratic Party | -- |

=== Prospective candidates ===
The following are some of the candidates who have made public their intentions to run:

- Obadiah Kimani
- Simon Ole Meeli
- Daniel Ole Nina
- Francis Sakuda
- Taraiya Ole Kores
- Moses Ole Parantai
- David Nkedianye

== County Assembly ==
Elected representatives included:

- Kajiado North - Joseph Manje
- Kajiado Central - Joseph Nkaisere
- Kajiado East - Terris Tobiko
- Kajiado West - Moses Sakuda
- Kajiado South - Juda Katoo
