= Loitokitok Airstrip =

- IATA: none; ICAO: none

Summary
- Airport type: Public, Civilian
- Serves: Loitokitok, Kenya
- Location: Loitokitok, Kenya
- Elevation AMSL: 5,322 ft / 1,622 m
- Coordinates: 02°54′25″S 37°31′17″E

Map
- Location of Loitokitok Airstrip in Kenya; Placement on map is approximate

Runways
Direction	Length		Surface
Direction	ft	m	Surface
14/32	3,281	1,000	Unpaved

Loitokitok Airstrip is an airstrip in Loitokitok, Kenya.

== Location ==
Loitokitok Airstrip is located in the town of Loitokitok, Kajiado County, in southeastern Kenya, at the International border with the Republic of Tanzania. The airport lies to the northeast of the town's central business district.

Its location is approximately 195 kilometres (121 mi), by air, southeast of Nairobi International Airport, the country's largest civilian airport. The geographic coordinates of this airport are:2° 54' 25.00"S, 37° 31' 17.00"E (Latitude:-2.9069453; Longitude:37.521389).

== Overview ==
Loitokitok Airstrip serves the town of Loitokitok and the adjacent communities. Situated at 5,322 feet (1,622 m) above sea level, as a single unpaved runway that is 3,281 feet (1,000 m) long.

== Airlines and destinations ==
At the moment there are no regular, scheduled airline services to Loitokitok Airstrip.

== See also ==
- Kenya Airports Authority
- Kenya Civil Aviation Authority
- List of airports in Kenya
