= Acacia Crest Academy =

Religiously affiliated PK-8 school in Kitengela, Kenya

- Acacia Road; Kitengela, Kajiado; Kenya

Information
- Type: day and boarding school
- Motto: Knowledge is Power
- Religious affiliation: Christian
- Founded: 2001
- Director: Stephen Kimang'a
- Head teacher: Catherine W. Maina
- Gender: Mixed
- Age: 3 to 14
- Houses: 3
- Colours: Blue and White
- Website: acaciacrest.co.ke

Acacia Crest Academy is a Christian learning institution located in Kitengela, Kenya. It was founded by Mr. and Mrs. Maina, and after a year of construction, Acacia opened in 2001. It is located 8 kilometres (5.0 mi) from town. The school began with preschool to class 4 initially and as a day school. Boarding facilities were added for 5–8 students.

It is a Christian school and Christianity is the foundation of its morals. The school is a member of the Kenya Private Schools Association (KPSA), in which the eighth class students sit for the Kenya Certificate of Primary Education (KCPE). The first KCPE was held in 2005, where the first student earned an outstanding 435 marks out of 500.

== History ==
Before the couple thought of building a school in the municipality, most of Kitengela was a bushy grassland. Kitengela at that time had not become a Nairobi suburb. Rapid growth came later. It was cited as one of Kenya's fastest-growing towns. After the school opened, co-founder Catherine Maina experienced a difficult time. Most of the pioneer parents removed their children, leaving only two students in class 2.

Initially, the school had one dormitory hosting two girls and one boy. The boy, slept alone, and the girls, who were sisters, slept in the upper story. One matron kept watch.

Soon after, enrollment increased, and more pupils moved into the dormitories. As the school grew, more dorms were added, reaching two for girls and two for boys. The boys' dorms are Mara Dorm, the initial dorm, followed by Samburu Dorm. The girls have Amboseli Dorm and Tsavo Dorm. Four matrons and the boarding master are present.

== Facilities ==
The school hosts over 800 pupils.

The dining hall is close to the classes. It is used for various other activities. On Sundays, it is converted into a church. On other occasions, (e.g., the day before closing day), it is converted into a cinema hall.

== Activities ==
The school participates in drama and music festivals up to the provincial level and offers subjects such as French, computers, and music. It also hosts clubs like: coding and robotics, music, wildlife, young farmers, scouts, st'johns and more. Educational trips and swimming are supported. The students engage in outside sports competitions.

=== Examination progress ===
Students first took the KCPE in 2005, attaining a mean score of 385.2 and taking position 49 nationally. 2006, with a mean score of 378.6 marks, took them to position 62 nationally, and in 2007, with a mean score of 381.86, the school reached 60 nationally and number 10 in Rift Valley Province. The 2008 mean score was 381.88.

KCPE scores
Year	No. of Pupils	Mean score
2005	16	385.19
2006	23	378.66
2007	28	381.86
2008	50	390.30
2009	46	369.04
2010	54	377.56
2011	68	373.68

In 2025, the candidates were called the "Indomitable Champions" and were striving to break the record of the most number of EEs (exceeds expectations) in one school.
