= Joseph Ole Nkaissery =

Kenyan politician and former general

Joseph Kasaine Ole Nkaissery

Cabinet Secretary for Interior and Coordination of National Government
- In office 2 December 2014 – 7 July 2017
- President: Uhuru Muigai Kenyatta
- Preceded by: Joseph ole Lenku
- Succeeded by: Fred Matiang'i

Assistant Minister, Defense
- In office February 2008 – March 2013
- President: Mwai Kibaki

Member of Parliament for Kajiado
- In office December 2002 – December 2014
- Preceded by: David Lenante Sankori
- Succeeded by: Elijah Memusi

Personal details
- Born: 28 November 1949 Kajiado District, Kenya Colony
- Died: 8 July 2017 (aged 67) Nairobi, Kenya
- Party: ODM (2005–2014)
- Spouse: Hellen Nkaissery (m. 1978–2017)
- Education: Kenyatta University; US Army War College

Military service
- Branch/service: Kenya Army
- Years of service: 1972 - 2002
- Rank: Major General

Major-General Joseph Kasaine Ole Nkaissery (28 November 1949 – 8 July 2017) was a Kenyan politician, serving as a Member of Parliament in the National Assembly of Kenya from 2002 to 2014, when he resigned to take up a cabinet position as Secretary for Internal Security and Coordination of National Government. He was also a senior elder of the Maasai community until his sudden death on 8 July 2017.

== Life and career ==
Before joining politics, Nkaissery served in the Kenya Defence Forces since 1973, rising to the rank of major-general in the Kenya Army. In 1987, he was appointed the military assistant to the Chief of General Staff. He also served as a commandant of the Armed Forces Training College. He retired in December 2002 after 29 years of military service.

Nkaissery was elected to the National Assembly in 2007 and served as an Assistant Minister for Internal Security in the cabinet of President Mwai Kibaki from 2008 to 2013. When Operation Linda Nchi was launched in 2011, he served as the assistant minister to the Kenyan Ministry of Defence.

On 2 December 2014, Nkaissery was nominated by President Uhuru Kenyatta for the post of Cabinet Secretary for Internal Security, to replace Joseph Ole Lenku, and subject to approval by the Parliament of Kenya. Following his approval as Cabinet Secretary, Nkaissery stepped down as Member of Parliament for Kajiado Central Constituency.

Nkaissery was a member of the Orange Democratic Movement (ODM) from 2007 to 2014. He was also coalition member of Coalition for Reforms and Democracy (CORD) from 2013 to 2014. He was first elected Member of Parliament on an ODM ticket in the 2007 general election before being re-elected on the same party ticket in 2013.

== Death ==
Nkaissery was admitted to Karen Hospital in Nairobi after reportedly collapsing at his home. He was pronounced dead in the morning on 8 July 2017, with post-mortem results showing that he had suffered from an acute myocardial Infarction.
