= Kajiado South Constituency =

Electoral constituency in Kenya

Kajiado South Constituency, also known as Loitoktok Constituency, is an electoral constituency in Kenya. It is one of five constituencies in Kajiado County. The constituency was established for the 1963 elections. The entire area of the constituency is located in Olkejuado county council.

== Members of Parliament ==
Elections	MP	Party	Notes
1963	Stanley Shapashina ole Oloitipitip	KADU	
1969	Stanley Shapashina ole Oloitipitip	KANU	One-party system
1974	Stanley Shapashina ole Oloitipitip	KANU	One-party system
1979	Stanley Shapashina ole Oloitipitip	KANU	One-party system
1983	Stanley Shapashina ole Oloitipitip	KANU	One-party system.
1986	Moses ole Kinah	KANU	By-elections, One-party system.
1988	Philip Lampat Sing’aru	KANU	One-party system.
1992	Philip Lampat Sing’aru	KANU	
1997	Geoffrey Mepukori Parpai	DP	
2002	Geoffrey Mepukori Parpai	NARC	
2003	Katoo ole Metito	NARC	
2007 to date	Katoo ole Metito	NARC-K	

== Wards ==
Wards
Ward	Registered Voters
Meto	2,156
Lenkisim	2,320
Entonet	4,785
Mbirikani	3,120
Kimana	4,972
Kuku	8,831
Rombo	8,708
Namanga	5,113
Mailua	1,060
Total	41,065
*September 2005.
