= Kajiado North Constituency =

Electoral constituency in Kenya

Kajiado North
- constituency for the Parliament of Kenya
- Kajiado North Constituency within Kajiado County

- Kajiado County within Kenya
- County: Kajiado
- Population: 306,596
- Area: 111 km^{2} (42.9 sq mi)

Current constituency
- Number of members: 1
- Party: UDA
- Member of Parliament: Onesmus Ngogoyo Nguro
- Wards: 5

Kajiado North Constituency is an electoral constituency in Kenya. It is one of five constituencies in Kajiado County. The constituency was established for the 1966 elections. The entire area of the constituency is located in Kajiado County.

Onesmus Ngogoyo of the United Democratic Alliance (UDA) represents the constituency in the National Assembly since August 2022, succeeding Joseph Manje who unsuccessfully contested to be Deputy Governor in the same general elections.

== Members of Parliament ==
Elections	MP	Party	Notes
1966	G. K. ole Kipury	KANU	
1969	John Keen	KANU	One-party system
1974	John Keen	KANU	One-party system
1979	John Keen	KANU	One-party system Died
1983	Philip Odupoy	KANU	One-party system.
1988	George Saitoti	KANU	One-party system.
1992	George Saitoti	KANU	
1997	George Saitoti	KANU	
2002	George Saitoti	NARC	
2007	George Saitoti	PNU	Died in June 2012 helicopter crash
September 2012	Moses Ole Sakuda	TNA	
March 2013	Joseph Manje	TNA	
August 2017	Joseph Manje	JP	
August 2022	Onesmus Ngogoyo	UDA	

== Locations and wards ==
Locations
Location	Population*
Central Keekonyokie	12,547
Isinya	8,178
Kiserian	22,635
Kitengela	23,770
Magadi	6,303
Mosiro	4,426
Nkaimoronya	50,221
Ngong	22,065
North Keekonyokie	16,962
Oldonyo Nyoike	3,391
Olkiramatian	10,187
Oloolua	24,647
Ongata Rongai	33,151
Olturoto	6,864
Shompole	7,678
South Keekonyokie	18,570
Total	x
1999 census.

Wards
Ward	Registered voters
Central Keekonyokie	3,285
Kaputei North	4,706
Kiserian	6,226
Kitengela	6,631
Magadi	2,812
Mosiro	1,374
Ngong	8,176
Nkai-Murunya	11,855
North Keekonyokie	5,172
Olkiramatian	1,991
Oloolua	6,717
Ongata rongai	9,343
Shompole	1,877
South Keekonyokie	4,163
Total	74,328
*September 2005.

== See also ==
Other constituencies in Kajiado County include Kajiado West constituency and Kajiado Central Constituency constituency.
