= Illasit =

- Location within Kenya
- Coordinates: 2.95°S 37.57°E
- Country: Kenya
- Province: Rift Valley Province
- Time zone: UTC+3 (EAT)

Illasit is a settlement in Kenya's Rift Valley Province near the Kenya-Tanzanian border.

== Location ==
Illasit literally basks in the face and foothills of Mt. Kilimanjaro. It is approximately 270 km by road southeast of Nairobi, the capital city of Kenya.

== Overview ==
Illasit is small but growing town in Loitokitok sub county, southeastern Kenya. The town has its administrative HQ in Loitokitok sub-county in which it is located. Illasit is served by social amenities like the Loitokitok general government hospital and Loitokitok Airstrip.

== Population ==
At this time there is no recent, reliable population estimate for the town of Illasit.
