= Loitokitok =

- Location within Kenya
- Coordinates: 2.9250°S 37.5100°E
- Country: Kenya
- County: Kajiado County
- Elevation: 1,622 m (5,322 ft)
- Time zone: UTC+3 (EAT)

Loitokitok, also Oloitokitok, or Loitoktok is a town in Kajiado County, Kajiado South Constituency close to the Tanzania and Kenya border. It is a vibrant multi cultural, multi ethnic border town.

== Location ==
Loitokitok town lies within the foothills and in a view of the highest mountain in Africa, Mount Kilimanjaro, found in Tanzania.

This location lies approximately 255 kilometres (158 mi), by road, southeast of Nairobi, the capital of Kenya and the largest city in the country.

== Overview ==
Loitokitok is a small but growing town in southeastern Kenya, bordering Tanzania. The town was previously the administrative headquarters of the former Loitokitok District, in which it was located. Loitokitok is served by a general government hospital and by Loitokitok Airstrip.

== Population ==
At this time there is no recent, reliable population estimate for the town of Loitokitok.

== Points of interest ==
Loitokitok or its environs is the location of the following points of interest:

- The offices of Loitokitok Town Council
- Loitokitok Mosque
- The headquarters of Loitokitok District Administration
- Loitokitok General Hospital - owned and administered by the Kenya Ministry of Health
- Loitokitok Post Office
- The international border between Kenya and the Republic of Tanzania - the border lies immediately southwest of the central business district of Loitokitok.
- A branch of Kenya Commercial Bank - a private financial institution
- A branch of Equity Bank Kenya - a private financial institution
- Loitokitok Airport - a public, civilian airfield
- A branch of Kenya Women Microfinance Bank - a private financial institution
- The African Plate - a restaurant
- Entepesi Kenya - a local Non-Governmental Organization focusing on healthcare issues within the community (www.entepesikenya.org)
