= Mbirikani =

- Location within Kenya
- Coordinates: 2.53°S 37.53°E
- Country: Kenya
- Province: Rift Valley Province
- Time zone: UTC+3 (EAT)

Mbirikani is a settlement in Kenya's Rift Valley Province.
