= Kajiado Central Constituency =

Kenyan electoral constituency

Kajiado Central
- constituency for the Parliament of Kenya
- Kajiado Central Constituency within Kajiado County

- Kajiado County within Kenya
- County: Kajiado
- Population: 161,862
- Area: 4,239 km^{2} (1,636.7 sq mi)

Current constituency
- Number of members: 1
- Party: ODM
- Member of Parliament: Elijah Memusi Ole Kanchory
- Wards: 5

Kajiado Central Constituency is an electoral constituency in Kenya. It is one of five constituencies in Kajiado County. The constituency was established for the 1988 elections.

== Members of Parliament ==
Elections	MP	Party	Notes
1988	Godfrey Kailol Parsaoti	KANU	One-party system.
1992	David Lenante Sankori	KANU	
1997	David Lenante Sankori	KANU	
2002	Joseph Ole Nkaissery	KANU	
2007	Joseph Ole Nkaissery	ODM	
2013	Joseph Ole Nkaissery	ODM	
2015	Elijah Memusi	ODM	By-election
2017	Elijah Memusi	ODM	

== Wards ==
Wards
Ward	Registered Voters	Local Authority
Eiti	504	Kajiado town
Esukuta	559	Kajiado town
Hospital	675	Kajiado town
Majengo	1,968	Kajiado town
Market	1,714	Kajiado town
Olopurupurana	805	Kajiado town
Ildamat	498	Olkejuado County
Kaputei Central	3,977	Olkejuado County
Kenyawa / Merrueshi	2,186	Olkejuado County
Loodokilani	3,346	Olkejuado County
Matapato East	2,492	Olkejuado County
Matapato West	5,184	Olkejuado County
North Dalalakutuk	2,509	Olkejuado County
Poka	3,700	Olkejuado County
Purko	2,005	Olkejuado County
South Dalalakutuk	1,855	Olkejuado County
Torosei	1,112	Olkejuado County
Total	35,089	
*September 2005.
