= Jacob Kaimenyi =

Kenyan politician

Hon Jacob Kaimenyi EBS
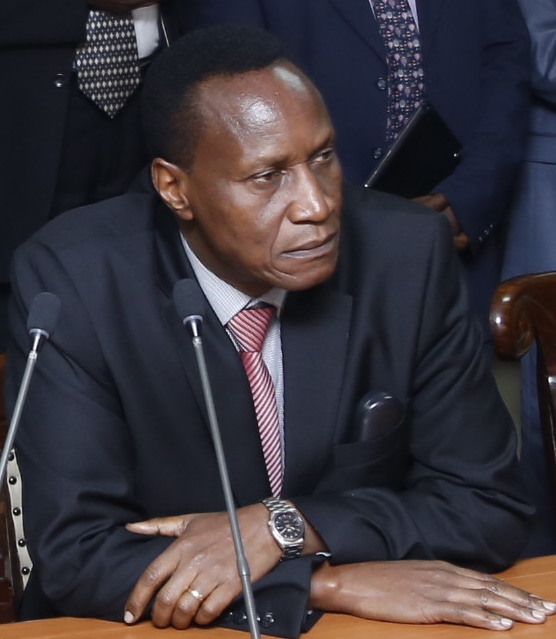

Kenyan Ambassador to Belgium
- Incumbent
- Assumed office 10 July 2018
- President: Uhuru Kenyatta
- Preceded by: Margaret Kamar

Cabinet Secretary for Education
- In office 25 April 2013 – 22 November 2015

Cabinet Secretary for Land, Housing and Urban Development
- In office 23 November 2015 – 14 January 2018

Personal details
- Born: 10 July 1952 (age 74) Kenya Colony
- Party: TNA
- Children: 5
- Education: University of Nairobi (BDS), (PhD); University of Mangalore (MDS)
- Occupation: Politician
- Profession: Dentist
- Positions: Professor, University of Nairobi (1998-2013)
- Religion: Catholic

Jacob Thuranira Kaimenyi (born 10 July 1952) is a Kenyan dentist who served as Cabinet Secretary for Education, and then Land, Housing, and Urban Development, in the Cabinet of President Uhuru Kenyatta, before being appointed as the Ambassador to Belgium.

He was on October 22, 2026 appointed as the second chancellor of the Management University of Africa (MUA).

== Early life and education ==
Kaimenyi was born in 1952. He holds a Bachelor of Dental Surgery Degree (BDS) and a Master of Dental Surgery in Periodontology (MDS) from University of Nairobi. He furthered his education at Nairobi University and acquired a Phd in periodontology.

== Honors and awards ==
- Order of the Burning Spear EBS by the president.
- Elder of the Golden Heart E.G.H
