= Katoo Ole Metito =

Kenyan politician

Judah Katoo Ole Metito EGH

State House Comptroller of Kenya
- Incumbent
- Assumed office 2022
- President: William Ruto

Member of Parliament for Kajiado South Constituency
- In office 2003–2022
- Preceded by: Geoffrey Mepukori Parpai

Minister for Provincial Administration and Internal Security
- In office 20 September 2012 – 2013
- President: Mwai Kibaki
- Preceded by: Yusuf Haji
- Succeeded by: Joseph Ole Lenku( As Cabinet Secretary for Interior and National Coordination]

Personal details
- Born: 1973 (age 52–53) Kenya
- Party: United Democratic Alliance (UDA)
- Education: University of Nairobi (PhD, B.Sc.); Strathmore University (Higher Diploma)
- Profession: Politician, Administrator
- Known for: Political leadership, public administration

Judah Katoo Ole Metito EGH (born 1973) is a Kenyan politician who is the current State House Comptroller of Kenya since 2022. Prior to becoming Statehouse Comptroller, he served as the elected Member Of Parliament of Kajiado South Constituency in Kajiado county from 2003 to 2022.

The office holder is appointed by the President.

== Education ==
Katoo Ole Metito holds a PhD in Business Administration from the University of Nairobi, B.Sc. in Microprocessor Technology and Instrumentation from the University of Nairobi and a Higher Diploma (Management of Information Systems) from Strathmore College.

Judah Katoo Ole Metito began his political career when he was elected Member of Parliament for Kajiado South Constituency in 2002 (serving from 2003 after the general election). Between 2006 and 2008, he served as Assistant Minister for Youth Affairs and Sports. In 2008, he was appointed Assistant Minister for Regional Development, a position he held until 2012. Following the death of George Saitoti, President Mwai Kibaki appointed him Minister of State for Provincial Administration and Internal Security in September 2012.

After the 2013 General Election, he served as the Majority Chief Whip in the National Assembly during the 11th Parliament. He later returned as Member of Parliament for Kajiado South in the 12th Parliament, where he also chaired the Departmental Committee on Defence and Foreign Relations.

In the 2022 General Election, Ole Metito contested the Kajiado County gubernatorial seat on a United Democratic Alliance (UDA) ticket but was defeated by the incumbent Governor, Joseph Ole Lenku. Following the election, President William Ruto appointed him State House Comptroller, a position he has held since 2022.

== Professional life ==
Outside politics, Katoo Ole Metito has served as an Administrator & Accountant for the Kenya Economic Pastoralist Development Association (2000 2001). He has also worked for the United Nations World Food Programme as a Divisional Controller in Kenya from 1998 to 2000. Before this appointment, he was an accountant with Amboseli Tsavo Group Ranches Conservation Association.

Katoo Ole Metito was elected in 2003 following the death of his predecessor Geoffrey Mepukori Parpai and intends to vie for Kajiado County gubernatorial seat come 2022 on a UDA ticket.
