= Teachers Service Commission =

Kenyan government body

The Teachers Service Commission (TSC) of Kenya is an Independent government Commission established under the Constitution of Kenya, article 237 to manage human resources within the education sector. It is based in the capital city, Nairobi with offices in the counties

== Roles of tsc ==
The role of the commission as defined in the constitution are:

- Register trained teachers
- Recruit and employ registered teachers
- Assign teachers employed by the commission for service in any public school or institution
- Promote and transfer teachers
- Exercise disciplinary control over teachers
- Terminate the employment of teachers

Other Roles are:

- Review the standards of education and training of persons entering the teaching service
- Review the demand for and the supply of teachers
- Advise the national government on matters relating to the teaching profession.

== Membership ==
The current membership of the Commission consists of:

- Dr Jamleck Muturi John- Chair
- Leila Ali- Vice- Chair
- Mbage Njuguna Nganga
- Timon Oyucho
- Sharon Kisire
- Annceta Wafukho
- Dr Nichodemus Anyang
- Christine Kahindi
- Salesa Abudo

== TSC Allowances ==
Here are some allowances that TSC may provide to teachers:

1. House Allowance: This allowance is provided to teachers to assist with housing expenses. The amount may depend on factors such as the teacher's job group and the location of their duty station.
2. Commuter Allowance: Teachers may receive a commuter allowance to cover transportation costs incurred while commuting to and from work. The amount may vary based on the teacher's duty station.
3. Medical Allowance: This allowance is meant to contribute to medical expenses. The amount may be influenced by factors such as the teacher's job group and other considerations.
4. Hardship Allowance: Teachers serving in hardship areas or locations with challenging living conditions may be eligible for hardship allowances. These allowances are designed to attract teachers to work in areas facing difficulties.
5. Special School Allowance: Teachers working in special schools or institutions catering to students with special needs may receive a special school allowance.
6. Responsibility Allowance: Teachers taking on additional responsibilities, such as administrative roles or serving as headteachers, may receive responsibility allowances to recognize the extra workload.
7. Professional Development Allowance: Teachers engaged in ongoing professional development activities, such as pursuing further education or attending relevant training programs, may receive allowances to support their continuous learning.

== TSC Payslip Online ==
The Teachers Service Commission has introduce an online portal where teachers registered with the commission can check their payslip information or updates.

T-Pay is a service provided by the Teachers Service Commission (TSC) in Kenya that allows teachers to access and manage their payslips online.

To check their payslips, Kenyan teachers can visit this page.
