= Moses ole Sakuda =

Kenyan politician

Dr. Moses Somoine Ole Sakuda

Member of Parliament for Kajiado West Constituency
- In office 2013–2017
- Preceded by: Constituency established
- Succeeded by: George Sunkuyia

Member of Parliament for Kajiado North Constituency
- In office September 2012 – March 2013
- Preceded by: George Saitoti
- Succeeded by: Joseph Manje

Assistant Minister for Regional Development
- In office 12 December 2012 – April 2013
- President: Mwai Kibaki

Assistant Minister for Foreign Affairs
- In office April 2013 – April 2013
- President: Mwai Kibaki

Personal details
- Party: TNA (formerly); Orange Democratic Movement (formerly)
- Education: PhD in Educational Leadership; MAEd in Educational Leadership; MDiv in Divinity; BA in Education
- Occupation: Politician, Academic
- Known for: Former MP for Kajiado North and Kajiado West

Moses Somoine Ole Sakuda is a Kenyan politician who was elected Member of Parliament for Kajiado North Constituency on a TNA ticket in a by-election in September 2012.

== Career ==
In 2013 he was elected as the first Member of Parliament for Kajiado West Constituency He had contested the seat, against former incumbent George Saitoti, running for ODM in the 2007 Kenyan general election. He was appointed a member of Multimedia University of Kenya Council on 10 November 2023 for three years (reference Kenya Gazette 10 November 2023).

== Education ==
He has a PHD in Educational Leadership, two masters degrees, in Educational Leadership and Divinity (MAed, MDiv) and a BA in Education . He is Currently the Acting Chairman of Multimedia University of Kenya. Previously served as Member of Parliament for Kajiado North and Kajiado West respectively. Previously he was Director of Programs and Projects in the Ministry of Energy, GM Administration GDC (Geothermal Development Authority). On 12/12/12 President Kibaki appointed him to his Cabinet as an Assistant Minister for Regional Development and later as Assistant Minister For Foreign Affairs.
