= Kitengela =

Plain in Kenya, close to Nairobi

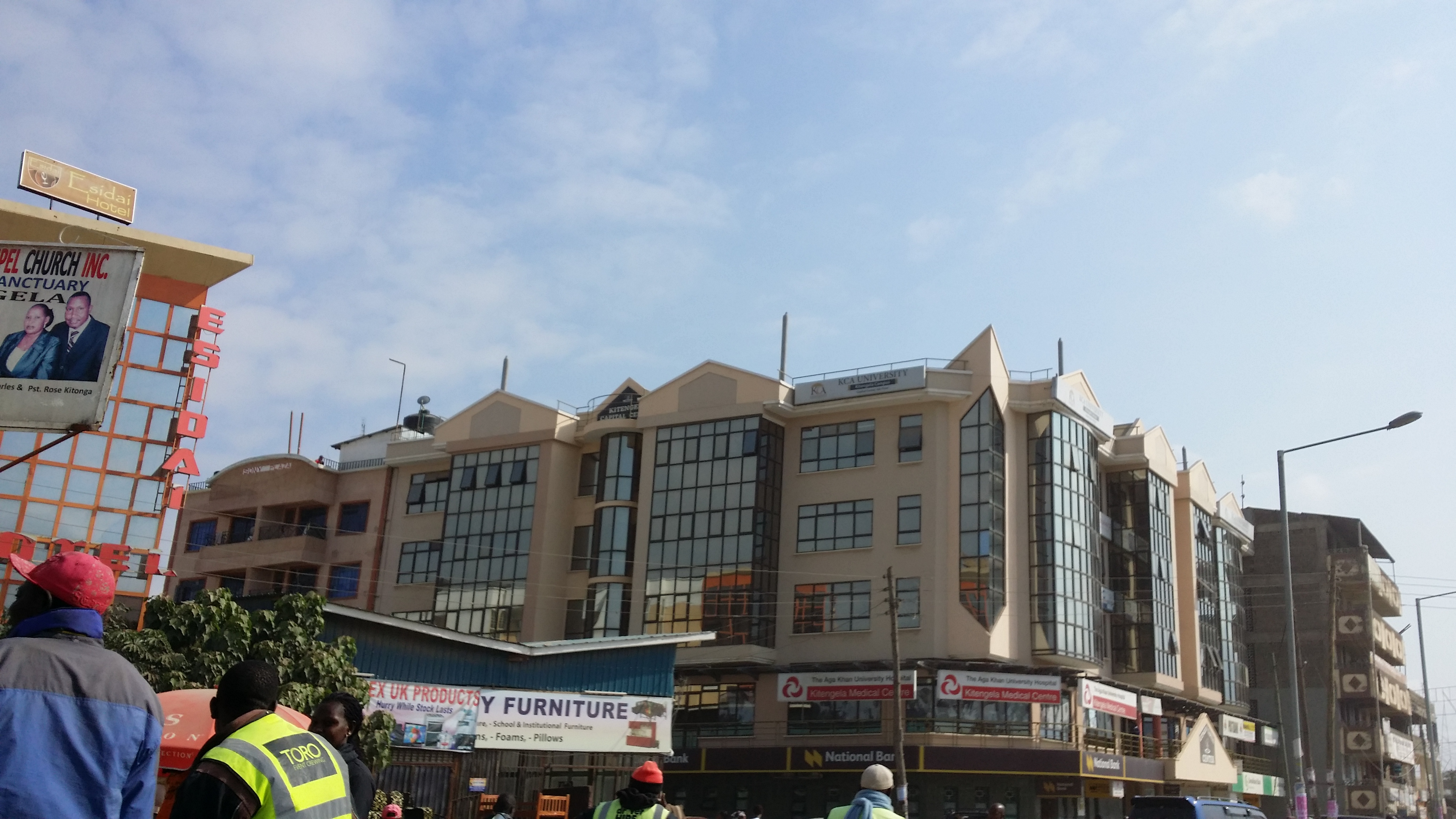
- Kitengela
- Nicknames: "Kite," Dusty South, Dustbowl County (DC), Triple K (Kitengela, Kajiado, Kenya)
- Location in Kenya
- Coordinates: 1°31′S 36°51′E
- Country: Kenya
- County: Kajiado County

Population (2009)
  - Total: 154,436
- Time zone: UTC+3 (EAT)

Kitengela is a municipality in the Kajiado County of Kenya, located 34 kilometres (21 mi) south of the capital Nairobi, forming part of the greater Metropolitan Area, Founded by Chief Ole Mutunkei and his son Simeon Sinkeet circa 1940 and named Kitengela, Later as government intervention ensued it was renamed to The Kitengela group ranch, made up of 18,292 hectares (45,200 acres) and 214 registered members which was subdivided in 1988 in efforts by the Government to encourage private land ownership in pastoral systems. This had the aim of intensifying and commercializing livestock production. After subdivision of the group ranch, land fragmentation and sales have continued at a steady and escalating pace. The human population within the Kitengela area has more than doubled in the last 10 years, from 6,548 in 1989 to 17,347 in 1999 to 58,167 in 2009. There is also a town named Kitengela in the area.

Close to Nairobi National Park is also the Kitengela Game Conservation Area populated with buffalo, Masai giraffe, eastern black rhino, Common eland, impala, Grant's and Thomson's gazelle, common waterbuck and Defassa waterbuck, hippopotamus, common warthog, olive baboon, monkeys and the attendant carnivores – lion, spotted hyena, cheetah, side-striped and black-backed jackals, African golden wolves, bat-eared fox and smaller carnivores.

The diversity of species is decreasing in the Kitengela area adjacent to the Nairobi National Park, where land-uses not compatible with wildlife are increasing.

== Kitengela town ==
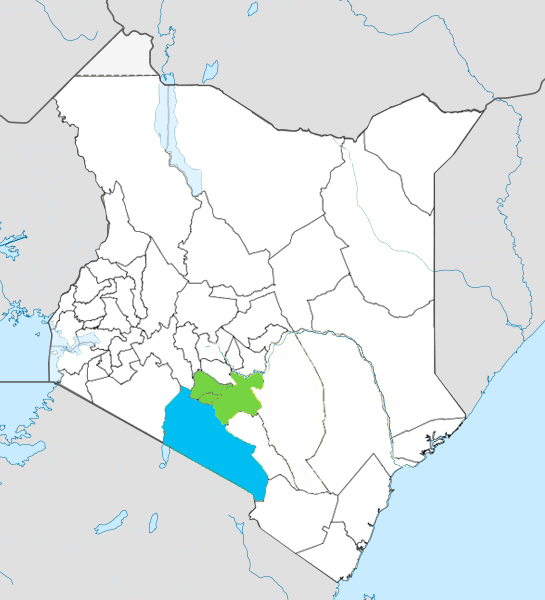
Kajiado County (blue) within Nairobi Metro (green)

Kitengela is a town in Kajiado County just 30 km (19 mi) south of Nairobi and is part of the Nairobi Metropolitan Area. Kitengela is one of the fastest growing urban areas of Kenya according to census data of 2019, having tripled in population inflows since 2009. It has an urban population of 154,436 people.

Kitengela is located nearAthi River town in Machakos County, in the former Eastern Province, and falls within Kajiado County, in the former Rift Valley Province. The area has experienced rapid growth, driven by an influx of middle-class Nairobi residents investing in gated communities and local businesses. This construction boom has been supported by more affordable land prices than in Nairobi, the presence of five cement companies and ongoing improvements to local infrastructure and amenities. Residents often describe Kitengela as offering “the best of both worlds”, combining convenient access to Nairobi with a more relaxed, rural pace of life and a strong sense of community among its residents.

Kitengela is famous for nyama choma (roast meat) – a Kenyan delicacy. The town has a wide variety of restaurants that serve this delicacy. Some of the most famous ones include the famous Yukos, Enkare, Arusha Meat Den and numerous more.

Kitengela has a wide variety of financial institutions and saccos (savings and credit cooperatives) that have flooded the town to finance the construction boom as well as cater to the soaring middle class population. It also has seen a boom in posh hotels, clubs and other entertainment facilities. In recent times Kitengela has developed a reputation for new, unique cutting-edge entertainment facilities such as Charlie's Bistro, Sparrows, Quiver, Guru, and 034, a 5 star club nestled in an airplane have sprung up in the town – a first for Kenya.

As Kitengela's middle class population has boomed, so has its wide variety of high end schools and universities to cater to the children of the middle classes. Some of the schools include Kitengela International Schools, Acacia Crest, Chuna Preparatory, Orchard Schools, Kennedy International School, Nova Pioneer Kitengela and numerous more. Some of the universities and colleges include KCA University Kitengela campus, Kitengela Institute of Management Studies, KAG East University, East African University, RAF International University among others.

Kitengela's gated communities for the middle classes include Chuna, Milimani, Royal Gates, New Valley, Muigai Prestige, New World Gardens, Safaricom 1 & 2 estates, Police Sacco Estate, EPZ estate, Fountain View, Riverside, Upper Valley, Kenpipe Gardens, Acacia and many more. These estates have seen an unprecedented boom due to the fact that most of them are controlled, not allowing unsightly flats or small businesses/kiosks within their gated walls. Chuna Estate, Royal Finesse and Royal Gates are considered among the best organised of them but many more are coming up each year. With the construction and completion of Isinya pipeline road, as well as the ongoing construction of the Mlolongo to Waiyaki Way expressway, as well as Konza City Metropolis nearby, Kitengela is poised to experience even more growth and development.

Kitengela is served by Jomo Kenyatta International Airport, Athi River SGR station as well as a future commuter rail station that is currently under construction that will connect commuters to Nairobi CBD.

== See also ==
- Acacia Crest Academy
- Isinya, a town located south of Kitengela
