= Ngong Hills =

Range of hills in Kenya

Coordinates: 1°24′S 36°38′E

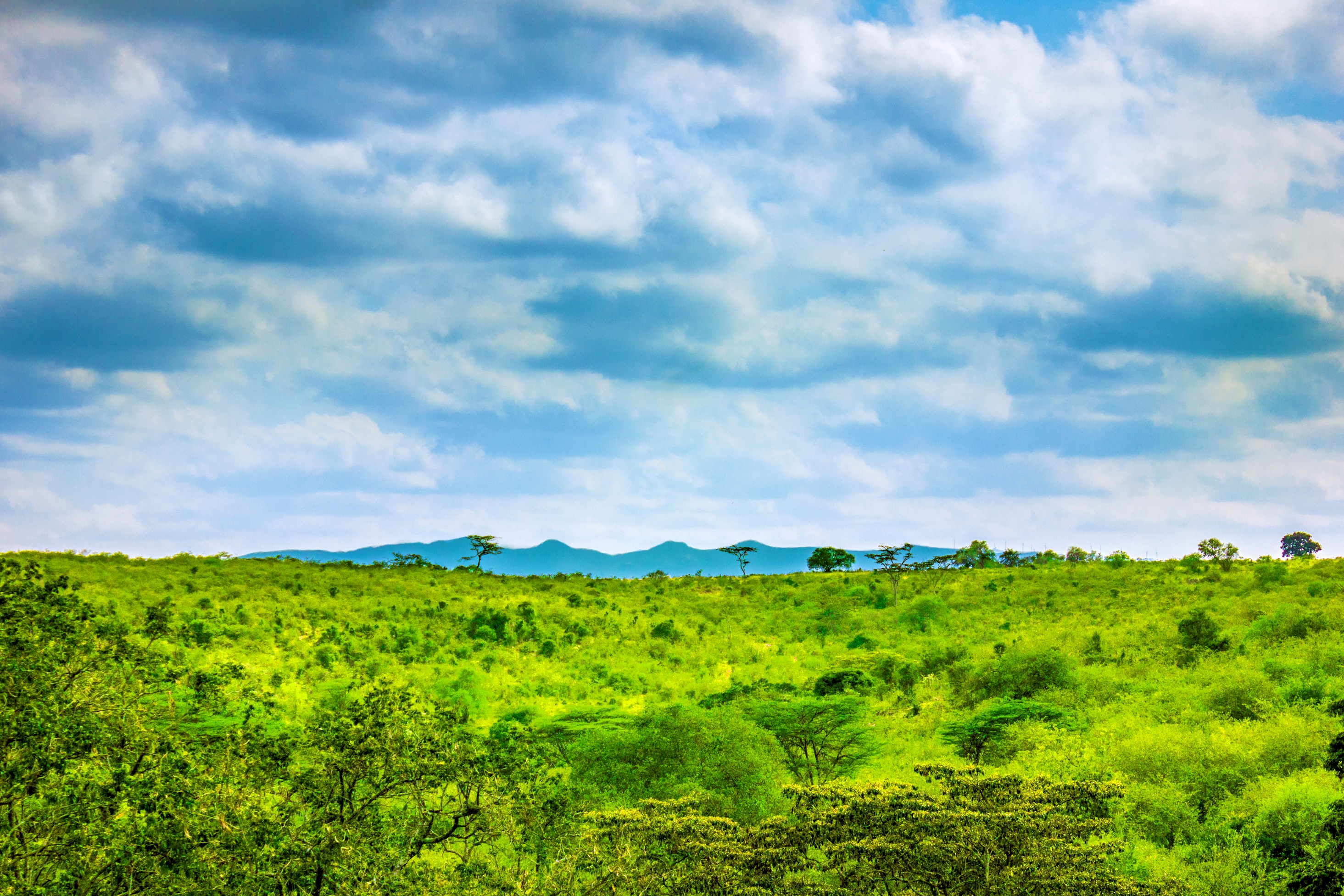
Ngong Hills, Nairobi, Kenya as viewed from Maasai Lodge, Ongata Rongai, Kenya

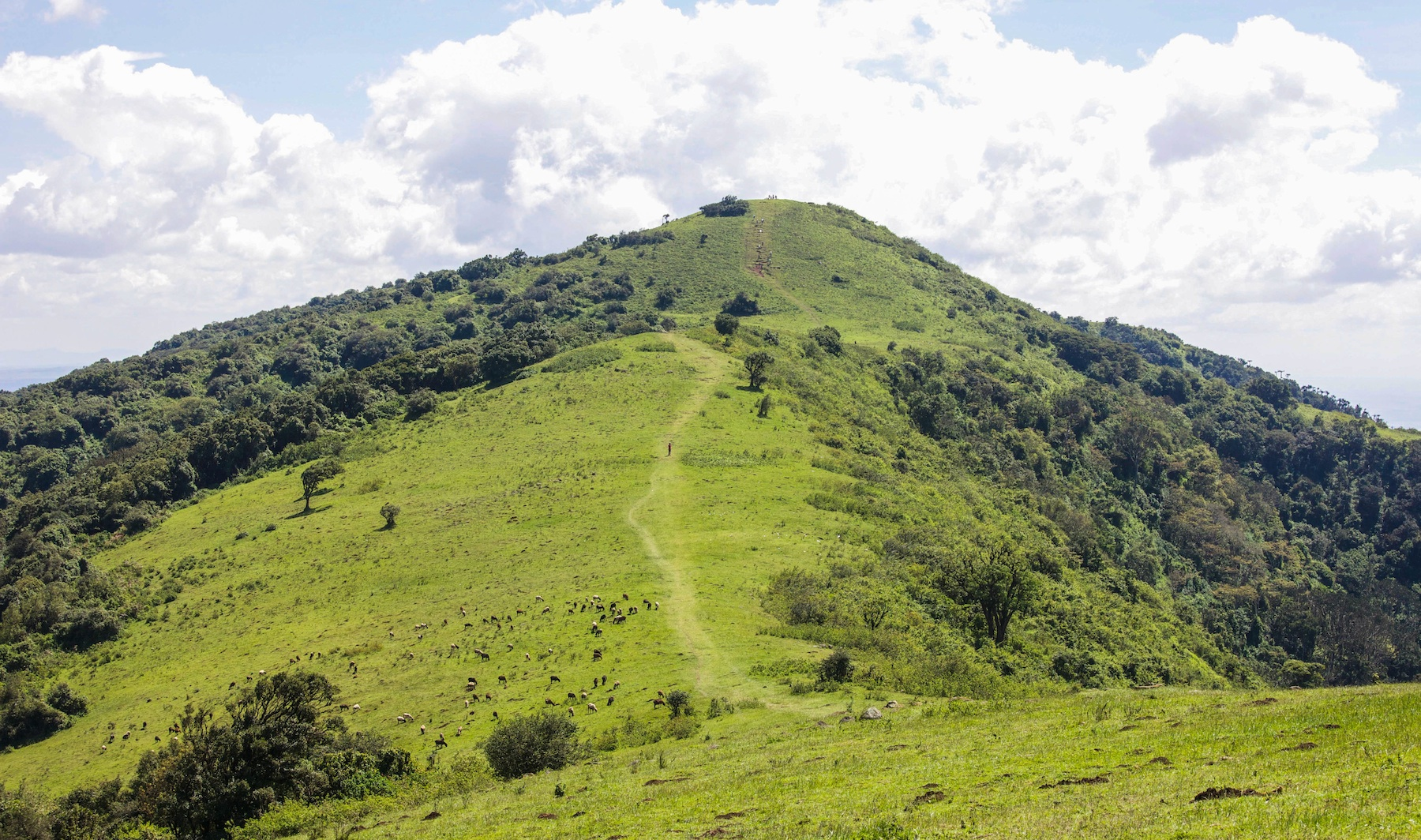
Ngong Hills

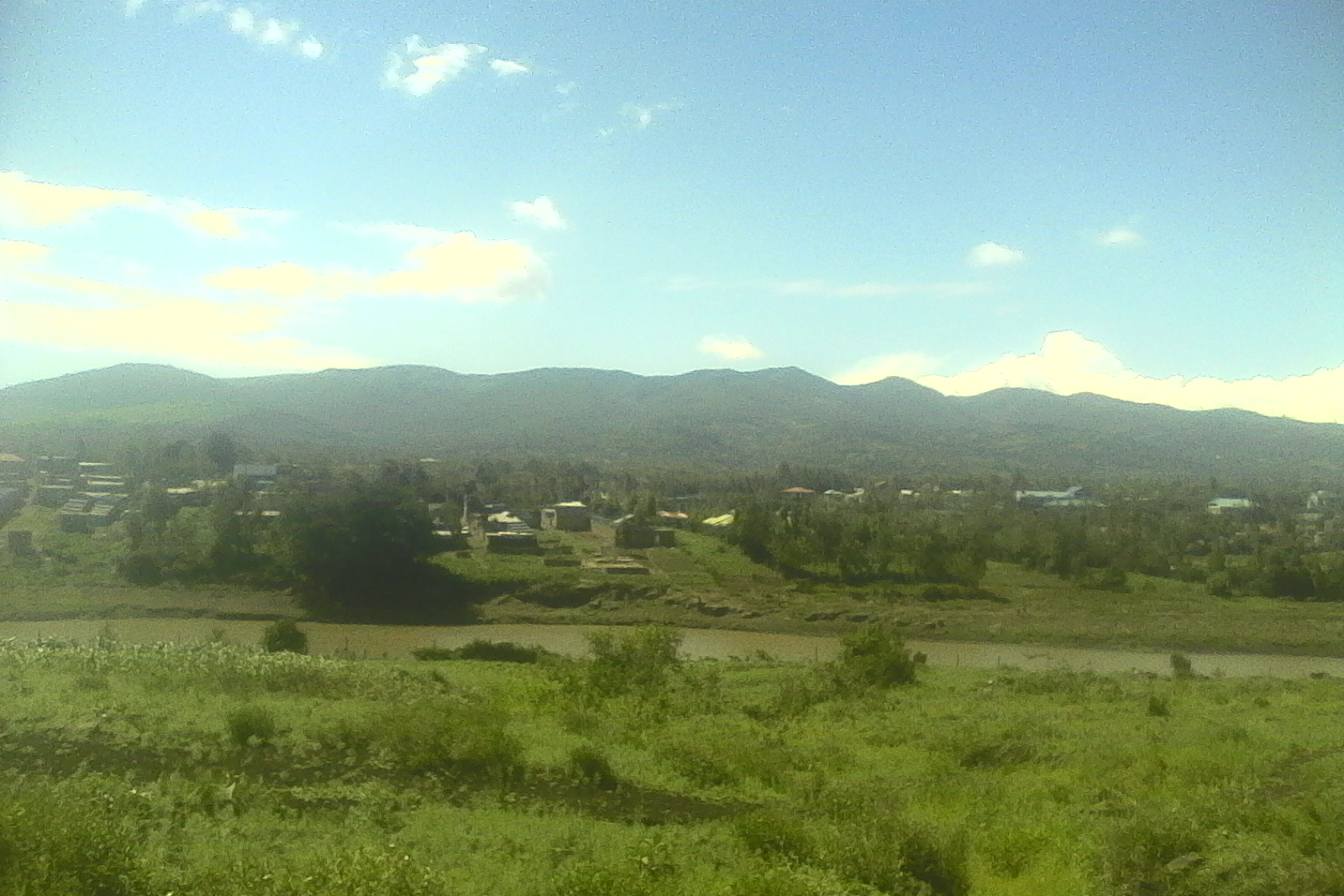
Ngong Hills as seen from Kiserian

The Ngong Hills are peaks in a ridge along the Great Rift Valley, located southwest near Nairobi, in southern Kenya. The word "Ngong" is an Anglicization of a Maasai phrase "enkong'u emuny" meaning rhinoceros spring, and this name derives from a spring located near Ngong Town.

The Ngong Hills, from the eastside slopes, overlook the Nairobi National Park and, off to the north, the city of Nairobi. The Ngong Hills, from the westside slopes, overlook the Great Rift Valley dropping over 1,000 m (3,281 ft) below, where Maasai villages have been developed. The peak of the Ngong Hills is 2,460 m (8,071 ft) above sea level.

During the years of British colonial rule, the area around the Ngong Hills was a major settler farming region, and many traditional colonial houses are still seen in the area. In the 1985 film Out of Africa, the four peaks of the Ngong Hills appear in the background of several scenes near Karen Blixen's house. Local residents still reported seeing lions in the Hills during the 1990s. The solitary grave of Denys Finch Hatton, marked by an obelisk and garden, is located on the eastern slopes of the Ngong Hills, overlooking the Nairobi National Park.

There is a walking trail along the tops of the Ngong Hills. Kenya Forest Service has a post at the NE foot of the park, where a fee is charged for touring. Local residents have sometimes held church services on the southern peak, overlooking the Great Rift Valley.

Near the hills is the town of Ngong. The Ngong Hills Wind Power Station, the first wind farm in the country, was completed in 2015. Kenya Forest Service offers guides and security to accompany hikers for an extra fee.

Ngong Hills Mbagathi Water Resource Users Association / Ngong Hills Mbagathi WRUA has been making the Ngong area Water Catchment area better by planting indigenous trees and town cleaning activities. Ngong Water catchment area covers Thogoto, Kibiko, Oloolua, Ngong Hills Forest Reserve and Nairobi National Park. It is a water catchment area for several important rivers.
