= Kajiado County =

Coordinates: 2°S 36.8667°E

- County
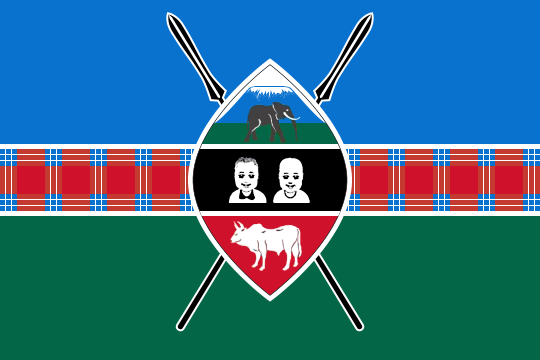
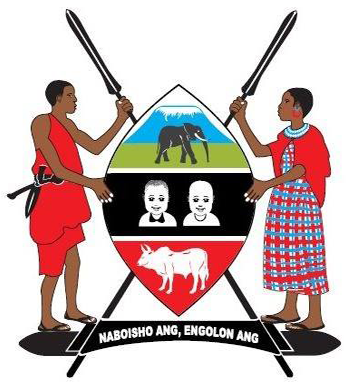
- Flag Coat of arms

- Location in Kenya
- Country: Kenya
- Formed: 4 March 2013
- Capital: Kajiado

Government
  - Governor: Joseph Ole Lenku

Area
  - Total: 21,292.7 km^{2} (8,221.2 sq mi)

Population (2019)
  - Total: 1,117,840
  - Density: 52.4987/km^{2} (135.971/sq mi)

GDP (PPP)
  - GDP: ▲$4.362 billion (22nd)(2022)
  - Per Capita: ▲$3,524 (2022) (29th)

GDP (NOMINAL)
  - GDP: ▲$1.604 billion (2022) (22nd)
  - Per Capita: ▲$1,294 (2022) (29th)
- Time zone: UTC+3 (EAT)
- Website: kajiado.go.ke

Kajiado County is a county in the former Rift Valley Province of Kenya. As of 2019, Kajiado county spanned an area of 21,292.7 km^{2}, with a recorded population of 1,117,840. The county borders Nairobi and to its south it borders the Tanzanian regions of Arusha and Kilimanjaro. The county capital is Kajiado town but the largest town is Ongata Rongai. Its main tourist attraction is wildlife. Parts of its northern boundaries, containing towns like Kitengela, Ngong, Ongata Rongai, and Kiserian are part of the Nairobi Metropolitan Area, forming the largest metropolitan area in East Africa.

== Demographics ==
Kajiado County has a total population of 1,117,840 people, of which 557,098 are males, 560,704 are females, and 38 intersex people. There are 316,179 households with an average size of 3.5 people per household and a population density of 51 people per square kilometre.

Population Density by Sub-County
Sub-county	Population
Isinya	210,473
Kajiado Central	161,862
Kajiado North	306,596
Kajiado West	82,849
Loitokitok	191,846
Mashuuru	64,214
Total	1,117,840

=== Religion ===
Religion in Kajiado County

Religion (2019 Census)	Number
Catholicism	204,086
Protestant	461,955
Evangelical Churches	260,678
African instituted Churches	53,865
Orthodox	4,162
Other Cristian	60,271
Islam	26,779
Hindu	379
Traditionists	3,421
Other	12,229
No ReligionAtheists	15,071
Don't Know	4,083
Not Stated	247

== Administrative and political units ==
Kajiado County is divided into 5 sub-counties and 25 Wards with Kajiado West being the largest and Kajiado North Sub-county being the smallest in terms of area in km^{2}.

== Administration units ==
Kajiado is subdivided into five sub-counties with 25 county assembly wards across the county. All the five constituencies have 5 county assembly wards each. There are 17 divisions which is further subdivided into 101 locations and 212 sub-locations.

Administrative Units by Sub-County
Sub County	Division	Location	Sub Location
Kajiado North	4	30	72
Kajiado Central	5	35	69
Isinya	2	9	18
Mashuru	2	11	19
Loitokitok	4	16	34
Total	17	101	212

=== Constituencies ===
- Kajiado Central Constituency
- Kajiado North Constituency
- Kajiado South Constituency
- Kajiado East Constituency
- Kajiado West Constituency

== Political leadership ==
Joseph Jama Ole Lenku is the governor serving his second term after being elected in 2017 and 2022. He is deputised by Martin Moshisho Martin. Phillip Salau Mpaayeiwas is serving his second term as the senator and was elected in 2017. Janet Marania Teyiaa is the second woman representative for the county and was also elected in 2017 on a Jubilee Party ticket.

== Education ==
Kajiado has 811 ECD centres, 568 primary schools, 124 secondary schools, 18 tertiary institutions and 7 polytechnics.

Education Institutions in Kajiado County 2014
Category	Public	Private	Total	Enrolment
ECD Centres	423	388	811	24,631
Primary schools	372	186	568	158,064
Secondary schools	71	53	124	24,709
Youth Polytechnics	7	0	7	
Technical Training Institutes	7	0	7	
University Campuses	1	5	6	
Universities	5		5	

== Health ==
The doctor population ratio is 1:26,094, Public Health Staff is 1: 7,619, and the nurse population ratio is 1: 1,068.

Health Facilities by Ownership
	Government	FBO	Private	NGO	TOTAL
Hospitals	4	1	10	16	41
Health centres	16	6	20	3	45
Dispensaries	74	13	4	2	93
Clinics	1	2	149	7	159

== Transport and communication ==
A total of 2,419.2 km of road network cover the county, of which 1,111.9 km is covered by earth surface, 932.3 km is murram surface and 375 km is covered by bitumen.
There are 11 Post Offices with 4,105 installed letter boxes, 3,220 rented letter boxes and 885 vacant letter boxes.

Trade and commerce

There are one hundred trading centres in the county.

Tomato, Cabbage, Kales and Banana are mainly grown for horticulture production. Crops grown for cereal production include maize, sorghum millet, beans, cowpeas and greengrams. Some of the tubers grown are sweet potatoes, cassava, Irish potatoes.

The three main livestock kept are cattle, sheep, goats and they are kept for meat, offal, raw fats, fresh hides and skins.

== Services ==
Stats for Kajiado County
County	Stats for the County (Per cent)
Literacy	55.4
Attending School (15-18 Yrs)	44.9
Paved Roads	5.9
Good Roads	38.4
Electricity Access	39.8
Stats for the County

Source: USAid Kenya

== Nairobi metro ==
Some Northern areas of Kajiado County bordering Nairobi are within Greater Nairobi metro.

== Stats ==
=== Population development ===
Historical population
Year	Pop.	±%
1979	149,005	—
1989	258,659	+73.6%
1999	406,054	+57.0%
2009	687,312	+69.3%
2019	1,117,840	+62.6%

=== Urbanisation ===
Urbanisation in Nairobi Metro
County	Urbanisation in Nairobi Metro (Per cent)
Nairobi County	100
Kiambu County	60.8
Machakos County	52
Kajiado County	41.4
Kenya Average	32.3
Urbanisation by County within Nairobi Metro

Source: OpenDataKenya

=== Wealth/Poverty Level ===
Wealth/Poverty Level in Nairobi Metro
County	Poverty Level in Nairobi Metro (Per cent)
Kajiado County	11.6
Kiambu County	21.8
Nairobi County	22
Machakos County	59.6
Kenya Average	45.9
Poverty level by County

Source: OpenDataKenya Worldbank

== See also ==
- Amboseli Reserve is in Kajiado County
- Nyiri Desert, a high proportion of the county lies in the desert
- Kitengela, a plain and a town of the same name in Kajiado County

== See also ==
- Taita Taveta County
- Machakos County
- Makueni County
- Kiambu County
- Nakuru County
- Narok County
- Nairobi County
