= Gerald Nathaniel Kalya =

Gerald Nathaniel Kalya was a former Member of Parliament for Mosop and Tinderet Constituencies.

== Early life ==
Hon. Gerald who hailed from Mosop, Nandi North District started as a teacher at St. Joseph, Kitale and later became an Education Officer during the pre-independence times. He attended the current Kapsabet High School for his education.

== Politics ==
Kalya joined politics as the First Senator of the then Nandi District in 1963 to 1966 when the senate was abolished. Consequently, he became Member of Parliament for Mosop from 1966 - 1974. In 1974 elections he was trounced by Robert Tiongoi arap Tanui. A year later Jean Marie Seroney was detained following the fallout with Government over his remarks about KANU when he upheld Martin Shikuku's claims that KANU is dead in parliament session where he sat on behalf of the speaker since he was the Deputy Speaker during that term. Kalya was urged by the opinion sharpers of Tinderet Constituency to run there as Seroney had been detain and lost his Tinderet Constituency Seat; he run for the parliamentary seat and won serving from 1976 to 1979 when he quit politics to concentrate in farming. He was succeeded by Henry Kosgey.

== Death ==
Kalya, 85, died on January 10, 2016, at an Eldoret hospital due to complications of stroke and diabetes was buried at his Mosoriot home in Nandi on Saturday. He is survived by his wife Emily and five children.
