= Nandi District =

Former district of Kenya

Coordinates: 0.166667°N 35.15°E

Nandi District was an administrative district in the Rift Valley Province of Kenya. Its capital town was Kapsabet.

Following the transfer of some of territory from Uganda to British East Africa, Nandi District was a subdivision of Kisumu Province. In 1929, it was when it was transferred to the newly created Nzoia Province. In 1934, the district was transferred to Rift Valley Province after the latter absorbed Nzoia Province. In 1963, Nandi District was one of the forty districts of Kenya.

In 2005, Nandi District was eliminated after it was split to form Nandi North and Nandi South, and later Nandi Central, Nandi East and Tindret. All the four districts had a combined population of 752,965.

As per the new law new counties were to be created based on the districts of Kenya that existed as at 1992. This effectively led to the creation of Nandi County.

The topography of the former district is dominated by the Nandi Hills. The local people are mostly of the Nandi tribe.

== Local authorities ==
Authority	Type	Population*	Urban pop.*
Kapsabet	Municipality	64,830	17,918
Nandi Hills	Town	63,134	3,575
Nandi county	County	450,787	3,156
* 1999 census. Source:

== Administrative divisions ==
Division	Population*	Urban pop.*	Headquarters
Aldai	96,220	200	Kobujoi
Kabiyet	43,367	751	Kabiyet
Kapsabet	125,115	16,942	Kapsabet
Kaptumo	26,782	150	Kaptumo
Kilibwoni	62,692	116	Kilibwoni
Kipkaren	52,753	0	
Kosirai	35,383	957	
Nandi Hills	77,514	3499	Nandi Hills
Tinderet	58,925	0	
* 1999 census. Sources: , ,

== Constituencies ==
The district had four constituencies:

- Mosop Constituency
- Emgwen Constituency
- Aldai Constituency
- Tinderet Constituency
