= Elijah Lagat =

Kenyan marathon runner and politician (1966–2025)

Personal information
- Nationality: Kenyan
- Born: 19 June 1966 Saniak, Nandi, Kenya
- Died: 29 September 2025 (aged 59) Eldoret, Kenya
- Education: University of Eastern Africa, Baraton; Africa Nazarene University
- Occupation: Politician

Sport
- Sport: Athletics
- Event: Marathon

Achievements and titles
- Olympic finals: DNF
- Personal best: 2:07:41

Elijah Kiptarbei Lagat (19 June 1966 – 29 September 2025) was a Kenyan marathon runner and politician who was the winner of the 104th running of the Boston Marathon held in 2000. He won in the closest finish in the race's history when he edged out Gezahegne Abera of Ethiopia and fellow Kenyan and previous year's champion, Moses Tanui. Abera and Lagat were both clocked at 2 hours 9 minutes and 47 seconds while Tanui finished three seconds back. Lagat's win enabled the Kenyans to capture the individual men's Boston Marathon title for the 10th straight year. This is a record that still stands.

== Early life ==
Lagat was born and raised in Saniak, Kenya in the Nandi District.

== 2000 Sydney Olympics Marathon Controversy ==
Lagat's win in the Boston Marathon initially gave him a spot on Kenya's marathon team in the 2000 Olympics. Lagat indicated his enthusiasm for running in the Olympics immediately after Boston. However, later in the year the director of the Kenyan Amateur Athletics Association, David Okeyo, replaced the three runners who had initially made the team (Lagat, Tanui and Japhet Kosgei) with three other Kenyans Ondoro Osoro, Erick Wainaina and Kenneth Cheruiyot. He claimed that the three who had initially made the team had not been training hard enough. This move may have been precipitated by poor Kenyan showings in the Olympic marathons in the past. It also may have been brought about by the three initial qualifiers' criticism of the Kenyan Amateur Athletics Association officials. Despite Kenya's many successes in marathoning, they were unable to secure an Olympic gold medal until Samuel Wanjiru's record setting run in the 2008 Beijing games.

Later in the summer of 2000 however, Osoro was shot in a carjacking incident. Lagat found his way back onto the team as a replacement after being clearly miffed by what he called a strange dismissal from the team. When the Sydney Olympics finally came about, Lagat was on the team and started the race but did not finish. He blamed his failure to finish on excessive preparation for the Olympic marathon; he claimed he wanted to show the Kenyan athletics officials he really could win but overtrained as a result.

== Motivation ==
Lagat began running simply to lose weight and not necessarily to compete at the highest level of the sport. As a young man, a physician told him that he "had a lot of fat around his heart" and needed to lose weight. He obliged and his weight decreased from 158 pounds in 1992 to 125 by the time he won the Boston Marathon. He started jogging in 1993 and began competing in 1994. He was already 27 when he first began competing; his late start in the sport is unusual and a testament to his innate talent. Before running, Lagat worked as an educational administrator before switching to full-time athlete.

== Other victories ==
Lagat won the Prague Marathon in 1998 and the Berlin Marathon in 1997. His best time was a 2:07:41 during his win in Berlin.

He tried to defend his Boston title in 2001 but finished 17th with a time of 2:17:59 that year. He did not compete at the same level afterwards.

== Politics ==
Prior to the 2002 general elections, Lagat was persuaded by his friends to vie for the Emgwen Constituency parliamentary seats. After initial resistance, Lagat agreed and vied for the seat on KANU ticket. He lost, however, to Stephen Kipkiyeny Tarus who represented the victorious NARC coalition. After the elections, Lagat continued his athletics career.

At the 2007 parliamentary elections, Lagat successfully vied for Emgwen Constituency parliamentary seat on ODM ticket, beating Tarus, who now represented the PNU party.

== Education ==
Lagat had a degree in history from University of Eastern Africa, Baraton, and a degree for an MBA in Strategic Management at Africa Nazarene University.

== Personal life and death ==
Lagat was a member of the Seventh-day Adventist Church. He died after a short illness at the Eldoret Hospital, on 29 September 2025, at the age of 59.

== Achievements ==
Year	Competition	Venue	Position	Event	Notes
Representing Kenya
1993	Mombasa Marathon	Mombasa, Kenya	2nd	Marathon	2:17:14
1995	Frankfurt Marathon	Frankfurt, Germany	2nd	Marathon	2:12:40
1996	Rotterdam Marathon	Rotterdam, Netherlands	7th	Marathon	2:11:54
1996	New York City Marathon	New York City, United States	19th	Marathon	2:18:35
1997	Turin Marathon	Turin, Italy	2nd	Marathon	2:09:19
1997	Berlin Marathon	Berlin, Germany	1st	Marathon	2:07:41
1998	Prague Marathon	Prague, Czech Republic	1st	Marathon	2:08:52
1998	Chicago Marathon	Chicago, United States	10th	Marathon	2:10:33
1999	Paris Marathon	Paris, France	5th	Marathon	2:08:50
1999	New York City Marathon	New York City, United States	6th	Marathon	2:09:59
2000	Boston Marathon	Boston, United States	1st	Marathon	2:09:47
2000	Olympic Games	Sydney	—	Marathon	DNF
2001	Boston Marathon	Boston, United States	17th	Marathon	2:17:59
2001	Madrid Marathon	Madrid, Spain	6th	Marathon	2:12:25

== See also ==
- List of winners of the Boston Marathon
