= Kimaiyo Sego =

Kimaiyo Karoney Arap Sego (born September 1952) is a lawyer and a former prominent politician from Kenya. Between 1988 and 1992, he served as Member of Parliament (MP) for Tinderet Constituency and briefly as Minister of Commerce in the Moi government. He also served as Chairman of the Kenyan National Anti-corruption Campaign Steering committee.

== Biography ==
Kimaiyo Arap Sego was born in 1952 in Kilibwoni location, Tinderet constituency, Nandi County to Sylvester Sego and Felister Sego, both farmers. His father served in the King's African Rifles (KAR) as a soldier of the battalion during the East African campaign of the Second World War. During his early years, he was educated at Kapchemoiywo Primary School. He later joined the prestigious Kapsabet High School for his O-levels and together with his younger brother Alexander Kiplimo Sego who is an accomplished career banker, were among the first students from Tinderet to be accepted into the prestigious boy's high school. He is also one of the prominent Old Boys of the school.

He later studied law at the University of Nairobi's School of Law and was admitted to the bar in 1973.

== Political career ==
Arap Sego launched his political bid for the Tinderet Constituency parliamentary seat during the 1988 general elections. He won by a landslide victory, trouncing the incumbent and two time MP Henry Kosgey. After the elections, he was appointed by then President Daniel Toroitich arap Moi to the cabinet as Minister of Commerce. During his tenure, he oversaw the amendment of the Trade Licensing Act which promoted the growth of domestic industries and as Minister, he represented Kenya in the Uruguay Round of the WTO Multilateral Trade Negotiations under the auspices of GATT. His Ministerial tenure, however ended prematurely when he was sacked just after nine months in office by Moi and replaced by fellow Nandi MP John Cheruiyot.

Reasons for his dismissal have been a source of much debate as regards the unconstitutional sweeping powers of the presidency. Political analysts such as Lynch observe that the grounds for his sacking were political since at the time, "Moi sustained internecine battles so that politicians expended much of their energy on fighting one another rather than on expanding their local support base."

During the first multi-party national elections in Kenya in 1992, he defected from the ruling political party Kenya African National Union (KANU) and joined the opposition party DP. This move proved a costly political decision. Whilst en route to submit his nomination papers for the Tinderet seat on a DP Party ticket, he was attacked and escaped narrowly. He later lost the election to Henry Kosgey.

== Public Service ==
After spending a number of years away from the public spotlight, he resumed public service in 2003 when he was appointed as Delegate to the National Constitutional Conference. The Bomas conference was created under the Constitution of Kenya Review Commission Act with the objective of reforming the 1969 Kenyan Constitution. Arap Sego served in the Technical Working Committee K which was in charge of Constitutional Commission and Amendments to the Constitution.

In 2005, he was appointed as Chairman of the National Anti-corruption Campaign Steering Committee (NACCSC) created in May 2004 to spearhead the fight against corruption in Kenya. He successfully led anti-corruption campaigns across the country and headed the committee until 2014. Arap Sego currently runs a private law practice in Nandi County in Kenya.
