= Donald Garvie =

European settler in Kenya (1873–1912)

Donald Sutherland Garvie
- Born: June 3, 1873; Edinburgh, Scotland
- Died: October 22, 1912 (aged 39); Nairobi, British East Africa
- Occupations: Settler, newspaper editor, cinema owner
- Known for: Opened the first movie theatre in Kenya
- Spouse: Nellie Steyn
- Children: 1

Donald Sutherland Garvie (3 June 1873 – 22 October 1912) was a pioneer European settler in Kenya. In 1909, he opened Garvie's Bioscope in Nairobi, the first movie theatre in Kenya.

== Early life ==
Garvie was born in Edinburgh, Scotland, and moved to South Africa in 1883 with his parents and two brothers. In the mid-1890s he travelled around Southern and Central Africa. During the Boer War he took part in the Siege of Kimberley. Thereafter, he married Nellie Steyn, an Afrikaner and relation of Martinus Theunis Steyn, then president of the Orange Free State.

== Kenya ==
In 1902, Garvie, his wife, and his wife's younger brother moved to the East Africa Protectorate. They were amongst the first settlers from South Africa, and travelled inland to settle amongst the Nandi tribe. Their home was approximately four miles from the British fort at Kaptumo and in April 1904, Richard Meinertzhagen noted that the only European settlers in Nandi country were two Boer families, the Garvie and Steyn, and that they lived in filthy grass huts with no attempts made to make them comfortable, sanitary or waterproof. Meinertzhagen also remarked how they had taken no steps to protect themselves from attack and seemed terrified of the local Nandi people. When Nellie gave birth to their first child in February 1905, the Nandi chief was so taken at seeing a white woman with long golden hair and a small white baby that he told them no harm would come to them.

Following a peace treaty between the Protectorate government and the Nandi tribe in December 1905, Garvie received a land grant of just over 20,000 acres on territory formerly belonging to the Nandi. Garvie later sold his land to his brother John and moved to Nairobi where he opened a boarding-house. In 1907, he co-founded The Advertiser of East Africa, a subsidiary of The East African Standard and remained its editor until 1909. The Advertiser was the official advertiser of Nairobi. In 1908, when his house on Victoria Street was burgled, he launched a campaign in the paper criticising the state of policing in Nairobi. In 1909, he opened the first movie theatre in Kenya on Government Road.

== Death ==
Garvie died in Nairobi on 22 October 1912, aged 39. His wife Nellie later moved to Kent, England, where she died in 1979 aged 94.
