= Jean-Marie Seroney =

Kenyan legislator (1927–1982)

Hon Jean-Marie Seroney OGW
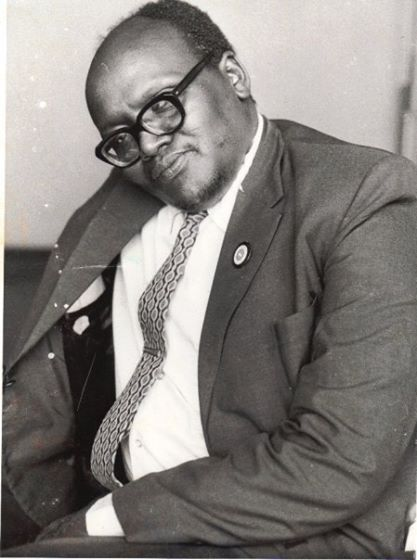
- Born: 25 July 1927; Kapsabet, Nandi District, Kenya Colony
- Died: 6 December 1982 (aged 55); Parklands, Nairobi, Kenya
- Burial place: Tinderet, Nandi County, Kenya
- Other name: Eric Kipketer
- Education: University of East Africa, Makerere University College; University of Allahabad; University of London; Inner Temple
- Occupations: Member of Kenyan Parliament and barrister
- Known for: Human rights advocacy, prisoner of conscience
- Political party: KANU

Jean-Marie Seroney (25 July 1927 – 6 December 1982) was a Kenyan human rights advocate, legislator, and an Amnesty International prisoner of conscience. He was detained as a prisoner of conscience for 1,155 days.

Seroney served as the Member of the Legislative Council for Nandi Constituency from 1961 to 1963 and a Member of Parliament (MP) for Nandi North from 1963 to 1966 before becoming the Member for the newly formed Tinderet Constituency from 1966 to 1975. As a legislator, he worked hard to introduce bills that would remove or at least check the excessive powers vested in the president as a result of the numerous amendments to the Constitution. He also brought in the first private member's bill to help ensure that Kenya's elections were free, fair, and inclusive.

Seroney decried what he described as the wanton abuse of power by the executive and condemned corruption, the unfair distribution of national wealth, theft of land from the poor by the ruling elite, and the failure to resettle the landless. He made powerful enemies, and his detention in harsh prison conditions for three and a half years set in motion the events that eventually led to his death.

== Early life ==
Jean-Marie Seroney was born Eric Kipketer Seroney on Monday, 25 July 1927 at Kapsabet, Nandi District of Kenya. He was the first child of the recently converted Africa Inland Mission (AIM) teacher/evangelist Reuben Seroney and Leah Jeptarus Tapmaina Seroney. Shortly after his birth, the Rev. Stuart M. Bryson took over the Kapsabet AIM Mission.. Bryson turned out to be a controversial missionary challenging the deeply held traditions of the Nandi in a bid to increase his numbers. He immediately sent Reuben Seroney to start a new Mission station and school at Surungai some 32 miles north of the Kapsabet Mission. Reuben and Leah taught at the Surungai School in the afternoons and spent their mornings preaching in the nearby villages.

The Seroney family lived in the Surungai Mission until 1933 when Reuben was asked to move to Kapsowar in Elgeyo-Marakwet area to pioneer the new Mission station together with Rev. and Mrs. R. V. Reynolds. The AIM had also started a hospital there which stands to date. Reuben Seroney stayed at Kapsowar as an evangelist and the lead teacher of the school for five years. He visited nearby villages and far-off areas teaching and preaching. It was during one of his visits to Kabartonjo in Tugen country that Reuben Seroney met Daniel Toroitich arap Moi, later to become President of Kenya. He became Moi's teacher and mentor and was instrumental in placing him at Government African School Kapsabet in 1938.

=== Education ===
The young Seroney began formal schooling in 1935 at Kapsowar with his father and Mrs. Reynolds as his instructors. Following his father's return to Kapsabet in May 1938, he joined the Government African School at Kapsabet (now Kapsabet High School) from 1938 to 1940. Seroney passed his Primary School Examination and was the only one in his class to be admitted to the Alliance High School in Kikuyu which was then Kenya's only secondary school. He obtained a scholarship from the Local Native Council (LNC) at Kapsabet which paid for him the required Sh. 200 annual fee. Seroney stayed at Alliance from 1941 to 1944, where he studied under Edward Carey Francis.

He sat for the Cambridge School Certificate and obtained a Division 1, which meant he could then proceed to Makerere for higher studies. He enrolled at the Makerere College in Kampala, Uganda in 1945 taking the Higher Studies in Arts. At Makerere, he won the prestigious Arts Research Prize. He was the founding President of the Political Society and served as the president of the Dramatic Society in his final year. After performing well at Makerere, he got the Government of India Scholarship to study at the prestigious University of Allahabad in the state of Uttar Pradesh, India. He began his studies there in September 1947 at the William Holland University College, a constituent college of the University of Allahabad. He completed his BA degree in 1949 obtaining a Second-class Honours, Upper Division. He began to study for his LL.B degree at the same university and completed it in December 1951 and obtained first-class honours.

=== Religion ===
In 1938, Reuben Seroney had a serious misunderstanding with outgoing missionary Stuart M. Bryson and his replacement Reginald V. Reynolds. Bryson was one of the most significant AIM missionaries to the Nandi people (a sub-tribe of the Kalenjin People) and helped translate the Bible into the Nandi language with Rev. Samuel Gimnyigei). Reuben Seroney disagreed with them over Nandi cultural practices that the AIM church continued to strongly oppose as well as the failure of the organization to grant him pastoral authority.

Reuben Seroney was then licensed to become an evangelist/teacher by the African Church Council of the 'Native Anglican Church' on 29 November 1942.

==== Becoming Catholic ====
The young Eric Seroney was baptized an Anglican in 1944 but also fell out with his own father in the matter of religion while attending Makerere College in 1946 where he became a Roman Catholic. It was from his conversion to the Catholic faith that he changed his name to John Marie Therese out of his devotion to St. Marie Therese of Liseux. He later Francized and hyphenated the name to Jean-Marie Seroney, dropping the active use of 'Therese'. He remained a practicing Catholic the remainder of his life devoted to St. Therese, even choosing to remain celibate.

== Political activities ==
While in India, Jean-Marie Seroney had kept the political pressure on the colonial government by various methods, even publishing an article in the Indian Review of January 1950 entitled 'Threat of South African Fascism to East Africa.'

The colonial administration in Kenya was impressed with his political activities and so it was felt that he should proceed to England for further studies. In February 1952, he was offered a loan by the Administration and in July 1952 he was admitted to the University College of the South-West of England at Exeter (now the University of Exeter) where he would study for an Intermediate LL.B of the University of London and at the same time study for the Bar at the Inner Temple London. Shortly before he went to Exeter, he attended and addressed the World Assembly for Moral Re-Armament in Caux, Switzerland in August 1952 and called for a new way of dealing with the issue of colonialism.

After differences with university authorities at Exeter over what he considered a repetition of his degree from India, he opted to go straight for the Bar instead of going through with the intermediate LLB. After much struggle with the colonial authorities both in England and in Kenya, he eventually sat for his Bar finals in December 1955, and on 7 February 1956, he was admitted to the Bar of England by the Honorable Society of the Inner Temple. He made history as only the third Kenyan to become a barrister after Chiedo More Gem Argwings-Kodhek and Charles Njonjo, and the first to also hold a law degree. He returned to Kenya fully qualified to practice law as a barrister before Her Majesty's High Courts.

=== Employment and entry into politics ===
On his return to Kenya in 1956, Seroney was appointed as a legal assistant in the office of the Registrar-General on 21 June 1956. In December 1957, he was promoted to the position of the public prosecutor in charge of bankruptcy offenses through a Kenya Gazette notice no. 4067 dated 3 December 1957.

On 25 September 1958, he applied to be admitted as a member of the Law Society of Kenya which had just been formed in 1948. Seroney had made history as the second black Kenyan African to qualify in law after the late Chiedo More Gem Argwings-Kodhek. At the time of his application in 1958, the Hon. Justice Chanan Singh was the Chairman of the Law Society of Kenya.

It was not until 1959 that Seroney finally ventured into politics proper when he called for the formation of a political party that took the interests of the Africans at heart. The following year he announced his intention to vie for the Nandi open seat at the Legislative Council (LegCo) on Sunday 27 November 1960.

On 13 February 1962, he was in the Kenyan Delegation to the Lancaster House Conference and the final Independence talks in September 1963. In 1963 he was elected Member of Parliament for Nandi North Constituency on a Kenya African Democratic Union ticket and also took his seat in the regional assembly that met in Nakuru. He crossed the floor, however, and joined the Kenya African National Union together with Taita araap Towett the MP for Bureti and William Murgor the MP for Elgeyo on 21 November 1963. This rubbed many the wrong way especially his friend-turned-foe Daniel arap Moi who had remained in KADU. On 27 November 1963, he invited Prime Minister Jomo Kenyatta to address a public rally in Kapsabet and Eldoret.

=== The Nandi Hills Declaration ===
The document was deemed seditious and Seroney was arrested on Saturday, 20 September 1969 at Eldoret and transported to Nakuru with his friend Mitei. On Tuesday 23 September charged with sedition in a Nakuru court. The defense was led by P.J. Wilkinson QC, a former Attorney General of Uganda assisted by Sibi-Okumu. They were convicted and fined KShs. 6,000 each by Resident Magistrate R.P. Maini.

=== Fallout with Moi ===
Some strong political forces in the Rift Valley started to gang up against Seroney ahead of the 1974 general election held on 14 October. Most notable was the then Councillor Ezekiel Barngetuny who was Moi's closest confidant in Nandi.

== Detention without trial ==
On 9 October 1975, Jean-Marie Seroney got in trouble again when as Deputy Speaker of Parliament after he refused to ask Martin Shikuku MP for Butere to substantiate his remark that "Kanu was dead". He replied to Kihika Kimani who had sought a substantiation of the remarks of Shikuku that "why substantiate the obvious...". This remark. led to his detention on 15 October 1975 at his office in Parliament at 7:15 pm.

Seroney never spoke of his days behind bars. However, those who visited him there said he took it stoically. He suffered terrible withdrawal symptoms from his addiction to tobacco but soon became stable.

Seroney was released from detention through a presidential pardon on 12 December 1978. He was released with 25 other prisoners, most of whom were prisoners of conscience. Among them were Ngũgĩ wa Thiong'o, Koigi wa Wamwere, George Anyona, Martin Shikuku, Wasonga Sijeyo, and others.

== Elections of 1979 ==
In January 1979, just 3 weeks after his release from detention, he was invited together with a large delegation from his Tinderet Constituency to Moi's home at Kabarak on 1 January 1979 ostensibly to begin a new year with new things. During the meeting, President Moi praised Seroney as a good leader and played down their differences, pledging to work with him. He reportedly said that if there were only a few others like Seroney, this nation would be very different. The truce was to last only a few days.

Seroney conceded defeat, pledging to work with the new MP, citing "grave irregularities during the election campaign and on the polling day..."

=== Violence against Seroney ===
Seroney had been physically harassed, beaten, and even denied permits to hold public rallies and where he did, they were disrupted. It was clear that someone desperately didn't want him to go back to Parliament. According to Peter Sang, an Eldoret businessman and supporter of Seroney, there was a deliberate scheme to rig out Seroney right from the start. He narrated a story told to him by H. K. Burrows the proprietor of Ogirgir Tea estate who found a mob of rowdy youth that had captured Seroney, roughed him up, spat on him all over, soiled him and mocked him in public as he was on the campaign trail.

Burrows intervened and had Seroney released by the mob. Seroney's supporter John Rugut a colleague of Sang at the Kibwari Tea Estate who witnessed this ordeal. Rugut says he found a dejected Seroney on the scene and helped calm the mob. He whisked Seroney to the safety of his car together with Burrows and drove him off to safety. It is clear that if they had not done that, Seroney might have been killed. It was soon clear that his re-election efforts were futile. He lost by an unreasonably huge margin. It was not probable, but it happened. On 16 November 1979 he issued a press statement pledging to work with the new MP and pledging his loyalty to President Moi.

== Investment and destitution ==
By 15 May 1980, he owed a whopping KShs. 1,545,012.15

== Death and controversy ==
On the afternoon of Tuesday, 30 November 1982 Seroney was admitted at MP Shah Hospital in Nairobi complaining of chest pains. He had been unwell for a number of days, avoiding going to the hospital. His secretary then called a doctor who took him to the hospital from his house in Mariakani (South B) Nairobi. He spent 5 days in the general ward and was due to be discharged on Friday of that week. However, his condition took a sudden turn for the worse shortly after a visit by some of his most ardent opponents. He was taken to ICU on Saturday where was put under further treatment when his condition worsened. On Monday 6 December at 6:45 am Hon. Jean- Marie Seroney died. His personal doctor Dr. Nalini P. Mandevia said that he died of "hepatitis failure, jaundice and anemia"

=== Legacy ===
Seroney helped champion social justice, the rule of law, and democracy through much of the early independence years of Kenya. His ideas of Devolution which he kept active through much of the sixties and seventies are now part of the Constitution of Kenya(2010). In 1969 Seroney is on record as having called for the release from detention of Oginga Odinga following his detention after the Kisumu riots. He called for the Government to clear Odinga and members of his Party the Kenya People's Union before the elections and to end the practice of detention without trial. He vigorously opposed attempts to make Kenya a single-party state strongly rooting for pluralism and political tolerance as well as national cohesion with the presence of active parliamentary opposition to check government. He championed press freedom famously calling for a 'free, frank and fearless' press in Kenya.

== Seroney's biography ==
A biographical book entitled Just for Today: The Life and Times of Jean-Marie Seroney by Godfrey K. Sang was launched at Jesus College, Oxford on 13 November 2015 by former Prime Minister Hon. Raila Amolo Odinga. The book was first published by Dolman Scott before being republished by Gapman Publications in 2018 and is now on the second edition. It contains a foreword by former UK High Commissioner to Kenya Sir Edward Clay and fellow detainees Koigi wa Wamwere and Ngugi wa Thiong'o as well as later detainee Raila Odinga. His co-detainee Martin Shikuku was extensively interviewed by the author.

On 13 April 2023, Kakamega County Senator Boni Khalwale mentioned the biography in the Kenyan Senate while contributing to a motion to recognize Kenyan heroes. He described the biography as a 'beautiful book..'
