= Nandi Hills Constituency =

Nandi Hills
- constituency
- Country: Kenya
- County: Nandi County

Nandi Hills is a constituency in Kenya. It is one of six constituencies in Nandi County. The constituency was established for the 2013 elections after being carved out of Tinderet constituency.

== Parliament ==
Elections	MP	Party	Notes
2022	Hon. Bernard Kitur	UDA	
2013	Alfred Keter	URP	
2017	Alfred Keter	JP	
