= Kapsabet High School =

High school in Kenya

Coordinates: 0.2032°N 35.1176°E

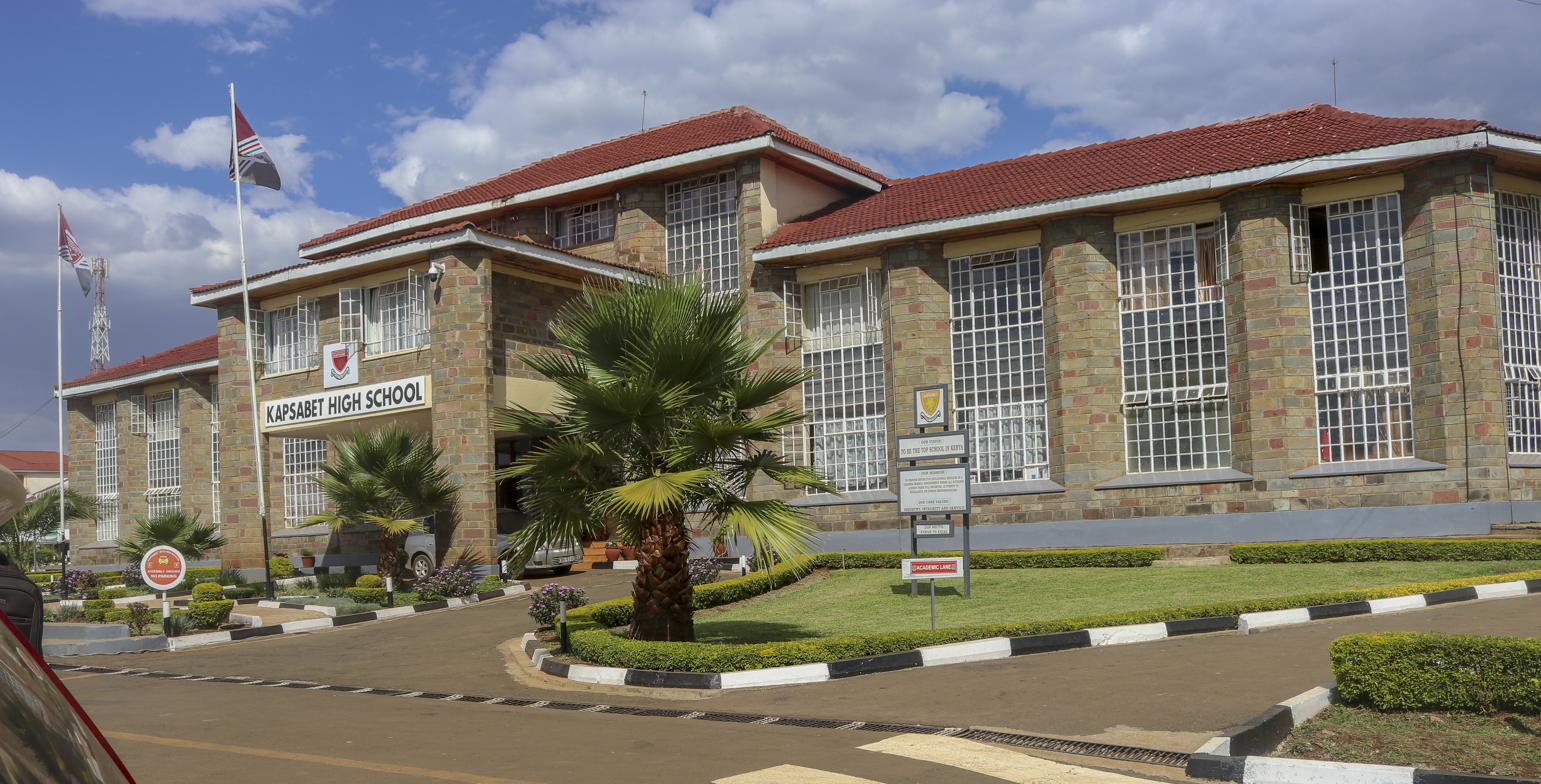
- Kapsabet, Nandi County; Kenya

Information
- Type: Public
- Motto: Strive to Excel
- Established: 1925
- Principal: Mr. Maiyo, Sammy Kipchumba (Arap)
- Grades: 9-12
- Enrolment: 2000+
- Color: Maroon
- Mascot: Lion
- Rivals: Kenya High School
- Website: www.kapsabethighschool.sc.ke

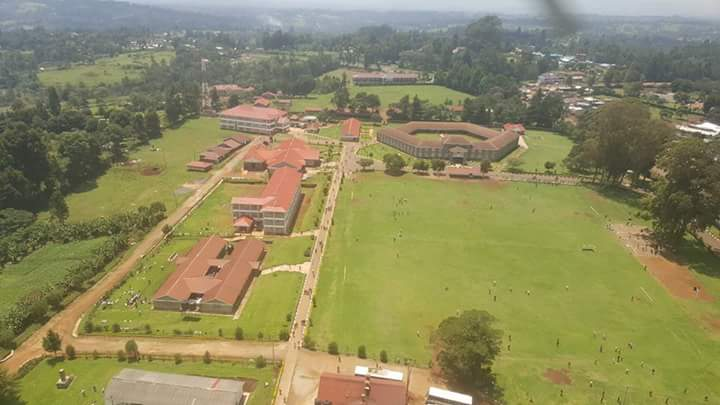
Aerial view of the campus

Kapsabet High School popularly known as KB is a public national high school for boys located in Kapsabet in Nandi County, about 40 kilometers from Eldoret.

== History ==
The school was founded in 1925 as the Government African School (GAS). It is one of the oldest high schools in the country. It was established to cater for African students at a time when schools were still segregated by the British colonialists.

It has undergone many transformations over the past century. The old school campus where the school stood at first is now used as a primary school, Kapsabet High Primary School.

The school now celebrates its Founders' Day on 4 February, every year.

== Ranking ==
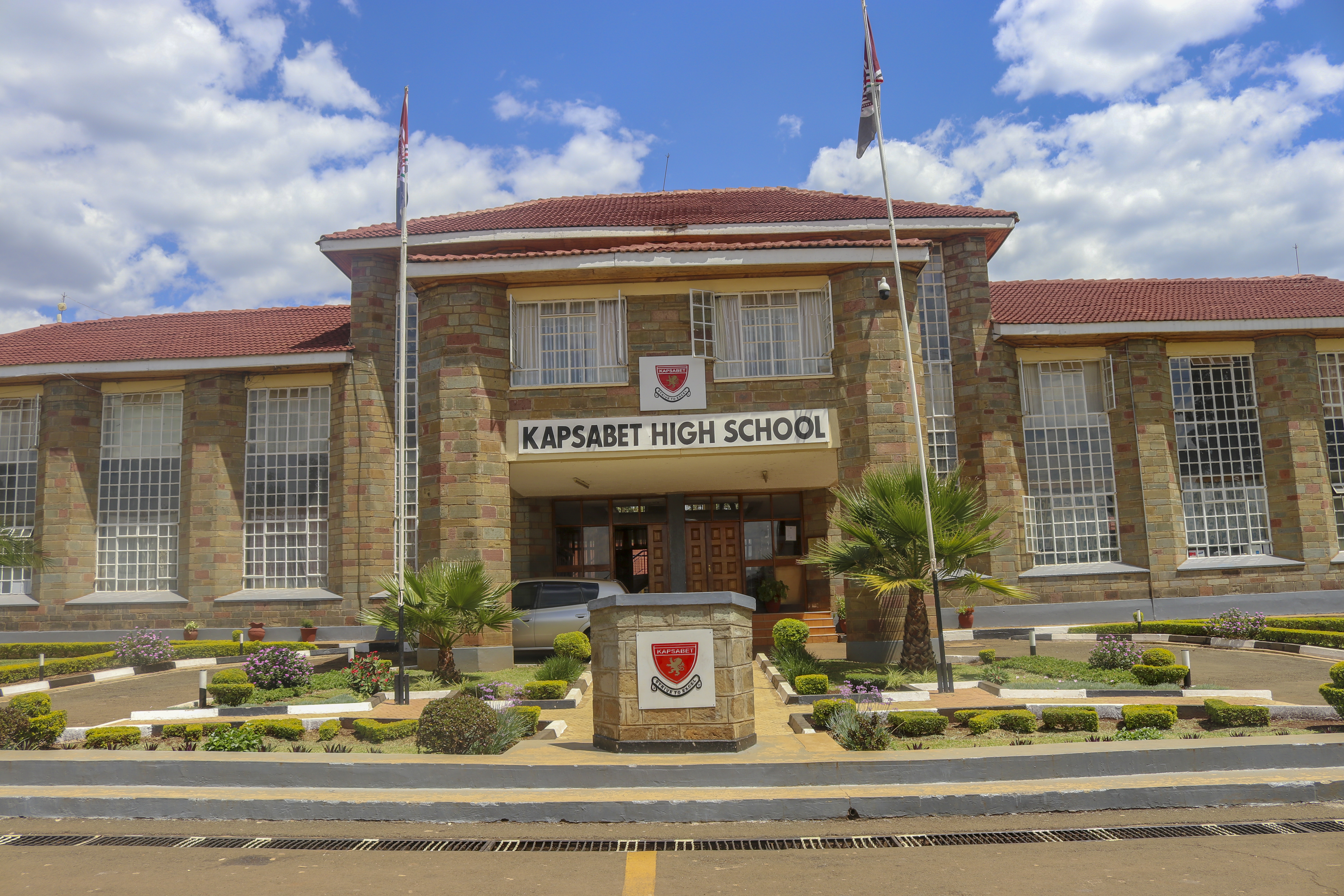
Kapsabet High School

Kapsabet is consistently ranked among the top schools in Kenya in the Kenya Certificate of Secondary Education, an examination which is taken nationally at the completion of Secondary Education.

The school has one of the lowest acceptance rates in the country. During the 2019 admission cycle 70,921 applied for admission but only 432 were admitted (a 0.6 percent acceptance rate).

Kenya Certificate of Secondary Education national rankings from 2013 to present:

- In 2013 it was ranked 4th nationally.
- In 2014 it was ranked 2nd nationally.
- In 2015 it was ranked 5th nationally.
- In 2016 it was ranked 15th nationally.
- In 2017 it was ranked 8th nationally.
- In 2018 it was ranked 4th nationally.
- In 2019 it was ranked 2nd nationally. The school also produced the top student in the country in 2019.
- In 2021 it was ranked 1st nationally.nationally.

== Management ==
The school's current board of management is chaired by Prof. Simeon Arap Mining, and the secretary is the chief-principal Mr Maiyo, Sammy Kipchumba (Arap) MBS, OGW.

== Notable alumni ==
- Nicholas Biwott, former Cabinet Minister and Member of Parliament from Keiyo South.
- Samson Cherarkey, the incumbent senator from Nandi County.
- Kipruto Rono Arap Kirwa, former Cabinet Minister for Agriculture and Member of Parliament from Cherang'any.
- Henry Kosgey, former long-serving Cabinet Minister and Member of Parliament from Tinderet.
- Daniel arap Moi, the second President of Kenya.
- William Ruto, the fifth President of Kenya.
- Stephen Sang, the incumbent Governor of Nandi County, and former Senator for Nandi County.
- Kimaiyo Sego, former Cabinet Minister and Member of Parliament from Tinderet.
- Jean-Marie Seroney, Kenyan legislator, human rights advocate and an Amnesty International prisoner of conscience.
- Julius Yego, the 2016 Olympics Javelin silver medalist; 2015 IAAF Javelin world champion.
