= Chesumei Constituency =

Electoral constituency of Kenya

Chesumei
- constituency for the Parliament of Kenya
- Chesumei Constituency within Nandi County

- Nandi County within Kenya
- County: Nandi
- Population: 164,133
- Area: 475 km^{2} (183.4 sq mi)

Current constituency
- Number of members: 1
- Party: UDA
- Member of Parliament: Paul Kibichiy Biego
- Wards: 5

Chesumei is a constituency in Kenya. It is one of six constituencies in Nandi County. The constituency was carved out from Emgwen and Mosop constituencies in 2013. It borders Emgwen to the South and Mosop to the North.
