= Henry Kosgey =

Kenyan politician

Henry Kiprono Kosgey is a Kenyan politician who was a member of parliament for Tinderet Constituency and was a Minister for Industrialization. He was also the Chairman of the Orange Democratic Movement (ODM);The longest serving Mp for Tinderet who is also a renowned large scale owner of tea farms.

== Early life ==
Henry Kiprono Kosgey was born on 14 July 1947 to Kipkosgey arap Moita and Martha Moek. Kosgey's father was a member of the Nandi sub-tribe of the Kalenjin community and his mother was from the Keiyo sub-tribe. Kosgey was raised in Nandi, Rift Valley Province where the family first lived in village called Kipkabos before later moving and settling in another village also in Nandi called Lelwak.

Kosgey attended Lelwak Primary and later Kilibwoni Primary for his primary school education. For his "O" Level secondary education he attended Kapsabet High School. He then went to Strathmore College in Nairobi for his "A" Levels. Kosgey then studied at the University of Nairobi where he graduated with a degree in Chemistry. He later won a scholarship to attend Ballarat University in Australia, where he studied and obtained a postgraduate degree.

== Politics ==
Kosgey has been in Kenyan politics for more than 30 years, serving both in Parliament and the Cabinet.

=== Parliament ===
Kosgey was first elected as MP of Tinderet Constituency in Rift Valley Province in 1979 under Daniel Arap Moi's Kenya African National Union (KANU) party. Kosgey won the seat in a hotly contested election where he defeated veteran vocal politician, Jean-Marie Seroney. Many thought that Kosgey who at the time was only 32 years old and a very shy public speaker, would not last very long and would soon be out of office. However, Kosgey surprised all by working diligently for the people of Tinderet. He subsequently won re-election to Parliament on five occasions (1983, 1992, 1997, 2002 and 2007)

Kosgey is the second longest-serving Member of Parliament after current President Mwai Kibaki (first elected in 1963).

However, Kosgey spent the period 1988 to 1992 outside Parliament. During the infamous 1988 elections, nearly all sitting M.Ps were forced out of office by an increasingly dictatorial regime. The controversial elections of that year precipitated a political crisis that eventually led to changes in the constitution to allow for more than one political party, paving the way for the historic 1992 multi-party elections.

Despite the presence of different political parties in the 1992 elections, KANU remained the dominant party in the Rift Valley Province due to the fact that its party leader and incumbent President Moi came from the Province. Kosgey therefore stood on a KANU ticket and was overwhelmingly re-elected to Parliament by the people of Tinderet. However KANU only won a narrow majority of parliamentary seats in the 1992 elections. The party retained this narrow majority in the 1997 elections. In both cases, Kosgey formed part of the KANU parliamentary majority.

In the 2002 elections, although Kosgey once again won his Tinderet parliamentary seat, KANU lost its majority in parliament. The party also lost the presidential elections. Kosgey together with other members of KANU found themselves in the Opposition. While in Opposition, Kosgey was able to re-invent himself as a popular national figure. When Raila Odinga and other key members of parliament formed a new party called Orange Democratic Movement, they elected Kosgey as the Party's National chairman.

In the 2007 elections, Kosgey stood and was elected to Parliament by the people of Tinderet on an ODM ticket. He, and other members of ODM, supported and campaigned for the party's presidential candidate, Raila Odinga. Following the disputed 2007 elections, Raila's ODM and President Kibaki's Party of National Unity agreed to work together. Kosgey alongside other members of parliament passed the National Accord and Reconciliation Act of 2008. This provided for the formation of the Grand Coalition government that would ensure peace and work for the best interests of all Kenyans.

=== Cabinet ===
During his political career, Kosgey has served in the following ministerial positions:

1. 1979 to 1985: Minister for Transport and Communications At the age of 32, Kosgey became one of Kenya's youngest ever Cabinet Ministers when he was appointed in 1979 to head the Ministry of Transport and Communications. The early 1980s was a period of rapid growth for Kenya's economy and as Minister, Kosgey was in charge of supervising the constructions of numerous roads; the setting up of Kenya Airways, Kenya Railways, Kenya Ports Authority following the disintegration of the East African Community. He also worked to modernise the telecommunications sector, making changes to what was then known as the Kenya Posts and Telecommunications Corporation (KPTC).

2. 1985 to 1987: Minister for Co-operative Development Following a re-shuffle in 1985, Kosgey was moved to the less high-profile Ministry of Co-operative Development. As Minister, Kosgey was tasked with improving and developing the co-operative movement in Kenya.

3. 1987 to 1988: Minister for Culture and Social Services In 1987, with only a few months remaining to the 1988 All Africa Games that were scheduled to take place in Kenya, Kosgey was moved to the Ministry of Culture and Social Services. The Ministry was in charge of organising the games. At the time there were numerous last minute preparations that needed to be done and Kosgey was given the responsibility of putting things in place. This was achieved, eventually resulting in the games taking place successfully. However, after the games, it was discovered that millions of shillings had been lost as a result of an advertising contract that had been awarded to a company owned by an American called Dick Berg. Berg had fled the country soon after the games concluded. Kosgey was accused of having been involved in the scandal. Kosgey denied the allegations claiming that the contract was awarded to Berg before he was moved to the ministry. A subsequent Commission of Inquiry cleared Kosgey of any wrongdoing. Nonetheless, the controversy tainted Kosgey's political career and continues to be cited by critics as examples of mistakes that he committed in the past.

4. 1988 to 1992: Not in Parliament or Cabinet. 1990 to 1992: served as chairman, Kenya National Assurance Company. In 1990 Kosgey was appointed Chairman of the Kenya National Assurance Company (KNAC). He served in this position until 1992 when he resigned to contest that year's elections. In 1996, KNAC collapsed due to a huge amount of debt. Critics accused Kosgey of having mismanaged the company during the period when he was chairman. Kosgey however maintains that he only headed the company for 2 years and that it collapsed 4 years after he left office. In addition, the 1990s was a period in Kenya's history where corruption and mismanagement had reached enormous proportions. The problems that affected KNAC affected numerous other state corporations because the underlying causes were systemic and not particular to any individual.

5. 1996 to 1997: Minister for Environment and Natural Resources: Kosgey was elected as a member of parliament in 1992 but spent the period 1992 to 1996 outside Cabinet in the back-bench. In 1996, during a mini re-shuffle he returned to the Cabinet when he was appointed Minister for Environment and Natural Resources.

6. 1998 to 1999: Minister for Tourism After the 1997 elections, Kosgey was appointed Minister for Tourism. At the time Kenya's Tourism sector was going through a very difficult period due to bad publicity in the international media following the 1997 elections. Matters worsened in 1998 when Osama Bin Laden's Al Qaeda terrorist group bombed the American Embassy in Nairobi. Kosgey therefore had the difficult task of restoring confidence in the tourism industry while managing and improving Kenya's image abroad.

7. 1999 to 2001: Minister for Science and Technology In 1999 Kosgey was moved and made Minister of Science and Technology, in the larger Ministry of Education, Science and Technology. He served in this position until 2001.

8. 2001 to 2002: Minister for Education In 2001, he was made Minister for Education. Kosgey spent most of this period negotiating with teachers who were pushing for salary increases.

9. 2008 to March 2013: Minister for Industrialization (suspended from 4 January 2011 to 10 August 2012) Following the disputed 2007 elections and the formation of the grand coalition government, Kosgey was appointed Minister for Industrialization. Kosgey decided to step aside in January 2011 to face charges of abuse of office relating to the importation of vehicles older than 8 years. Following a lengthy court case, the High Court cleared Kosgey of any wrongdoing on 28 June 2012. On 10 August 2012 President Kibaki reinstated Kosgey as Minister for Industrialization.

== Court case ==
On 4 January 2011, Kosgey was arrested and charged in court over allegations that he authorised the importation of 113 vehicles that were older than eight years. The law bars the importation of vehicles older than 8 years but gives the Minister powers to exempt imports from this rule. The law provides for the National Standards Council to advise the Minister on the issuance of such exemptions. It also states that the Minister should satisfy himself that it is in the national interests to grant the exemptions. Kosgey is accused of having exempted 113 vehicles from this rule without obtaining advice from the National Standards Council and without satisfying himself that it is in the national interests to give these exemptions, and by so doing abusing his office. He has denied the charges.

During the trial, the Prosecution made the case that the requirement to obtain advice from the NSC is mandatory and the fact that the Minister granted exemptions without such advice meant that he broke the law. They further argued that the exemptions were not motivated by any national interests as required by law. Kosgey's defence argued that the requirement to obtain advice is not mandatory. As for the issue of national interests, they stated that this is subjective and is a matter of opinion. They also argued that Kosgey was acting according to the precedent set by his predecessors. His immediate predecessor, former Minister Mukhisa Kituyi, issued approximately 3,000 exemptions using the same law and in exactly the same manner as Kosgey without obtaining any advice from the NSC. This fact is not disputed by the Prosecution who argued that two wrongs do not make a right. Kosgey's defence have also argued that the issuance of the exemptions did not result in any loss of revenue for the government, if anything the government collected taxes for each of the 113 vehicles that had been exempted from the 8-year rule.

On Thursday 28 June 2012, the High Court in Nairobi dismissed the case against Kosgey and cleared him of any wrongdoing. In his ruling, Justice Nicholas Ombija said that Kosgey's prosecution had arisen due to differences that existed between Kosgey as the Minister and his Permanent Secretary, Karanja Kibicho. He termed the case as a gross abuse of the judicial system and an error in law.

== ICC 2007 election allegations ==
Following the 2007 Kenyan presidential election, the incumbent, President Mwai Kibaki was declared the winner but this was disputed by the opposition who alleged fraud. The following 2007–2008 Kenyan crisis resulted in around 1,000 deaths on both sides and 200,000 people displaced. Human Rights Watch said that on the opposition side, politicians had met with Kalenjin leaders to "organise, direct and facilitate" violent attacks against Kikuyus. Following mediation, the parties agreed to establish the Waki Commission to investigate the violence. The Waki Commission recommended the establishment of a local Tribunal and, failing that, referral to the International Criminal Court.

In March 2010, the Prosecutor of the International Criminal Court (ICC) requested the Court to open an investigation into the Kenyan situation. On 15 December 2010, the Prosecutor announced that Kosgey was one of six Kenyans he had applied to the court for summons to be issued alleging crimes against humanity. The Prosecutor alleged that Kosgey was a "principal planner and organiser of crimes against PNU supporters".

On 8 March 2011, the Court issued summons for Kosgey together with the other five Kenyans to appear before the Court. Kosgey appeared voluntarily before the court on 7 April 2011. A date for confirmation of charges hearings was fixed for 1 September 2011.

The hearing to decide whether or not to confirm the charges against Kosgey took place before the ICC Pre-Trial Chamber II from Thursday 1 September 2011 to Thursday 8 September 2011. The Prosecution put forward a case alleging that Kosgey together with William Ruto and Joshua Sang were members of a network that organised violence in Kenya. Kosgey's lawyers presented his defence during the hearings and denied that Kosgey was a member of any illicit network, if indeed such a network existed. They argued that the Prosecution's case against Kosgey rests entirely on a single, anonymous witness, known only as witness 6. This witness claims that Kosgey attended planning meetings of the alleged network. Witness 6 is the only Prosecution witness to implicate Kosgey in this manner. Aside from the statement of witness 6, the Prosecution had no other evidence or proof of Kosgey's involvement in the planning of any violence. Kosgey's defence argued that the fact that the statement of witness 6 was not corroborated by any other source or any real material evidence means that it is unreliable. This view, they claim, is backed up by the ICC's own previous rulings and jurisprudence. According to Kosgey's defence, witness 6's statement amounts to hearsay and should therefore be dismissed. Kosgey's defence also complained that the Prosecution failed to carry out proper investigations in Kenya, noting that at no point did they interview or request to meet with Kosgey himself or even inform him that he was a suspect. They state that had this been done, Kosgey would have at least had an opportunity to understand the charges and offer exonerating and exculpatory evidence.

On 23 January 2012, the International Criminal Court pre-trial chamber II declined to confirm any of the charges against Kosgey, citing insufficient prosecution evidence to sustain a full trial. Charges against his two co-accused were confirmed.

== Post 2013 Elections ==
On the general elections held on 4 March 2013, Henry Kosgey contested the Nandi County Senate seat on an ODM ticket. The seat was won by Stephen Sang who was the URP candidate.
