= David Koech =

Kenyan politician

David Koech is a Kenyan politician. He belongs to the Orange Democratic Movement and was elected to represent the Mosop Constituency in the National Assembly of Kenya since the 2007 Kenyan parliamentary election.
