= Kapsabet =

- Town
- Location within Kenya
- Coordinates: 0°20′N 35°10′E
- Country: Kenya
- County: Nandi County

Population (2009)
  - Total: 86,803
- Time zone: UTC+3 (EAT)
- Climate: Cfb

Kapsabet is a town in Kenya. It is the capital of Nandi County and is located 40 kilometres southwest of Eldoret on the way to Chavakali.

The name Kapsabet comes from "Kap"- 'belong to/area of' and "sabit" or "sobet" – 'live' and has come to mean 'a place of life' though external influences and documentation refer it as Kapsabet. The locals praise it as 'Kapsabit ak mego'. Kapsabet municipality has a total population of 86,803 (2009 census).

== Demographics and culture ==
=== Ethnicity and language ===
Kapsabet municipality has a total population of 86,803 (2009 census). The majority of residents belong to the Nandi section of the Kalenjin ethnic group. There is also a substantial number of Maragoli, Tiriki (both subtribes of Luhya). Gusii, Somali, Indians and Luos are also residents of the town

=== Religion ===
Kapsabet is predominantly a Christian town. Major churches include AIC Kapsabet, CITAM (Christ Is The Answer Ministries) St Peters' Catholic Parish, ACK St Barnabas, and Seventh Day Adventist church. The town is the headquarters of the Roman Catholic Diocese of Kapsabet, which was created on 10 July 2025.

The town is also home to a thriving community of members of the Islam and Hindu. In fact there are three mosques, one in the town, another in Kamobo just outside the town and one in Surungai estate opposite the Chebut tea factory. Most Muslims are Sunni.

== Administration ==
Kapsabet municipality was previously the headquarters of the then Kapsabet Municipality which was run by the Municipal Council. It was last headed at the civic level by His Worship Councillor Michael Rono and at the executive level by Mr. Shedd D. Simotwo, the Town Clerk.

Today the town acts as the headquarters of Nandi County. The first county administration was headed by Cleophas Lagat, who served from 2013 to 2017. As of 2017 the county administration has been headed by the governor, Hon Stephen Arap Sang.

== Economy ==
Kapsabet is an agricultural town. Within its environs are large tea and maize farms as well as a number of horticulture and dairy concerns. The town has a milk depot operated by New Kenya Cooperative Creameries (New KCC) and the KTDA Chebut Tea Factory.

There are also a number of tourist sites in Nandi county. Notable sites in the county include the rare Sitatunga antelopes found at Kingwal Swamps, and the ‘Cliff of Death’ where suicidal people have reportedly ended their lives.

The Nandi county government inherited about 400 acres from the defunct Kapsabet Municipal Council, on which it plans to build an industrial park, a marketplace and some houses.

Real estate development has seen substantial growth particularly since the advent of devolution. Evidence of demand for space in the town is seen through the entry of 11 bank branches and popular retail stores such as Naivas.

Major financial institutions present in Kapsabet Town are Kenya Commercial Bank, Co-operative Bank of Kenya, Barclays Bank, Kenya Women Finance Trust(KWFT), Equity Bank and National Bank of Kenya. Nandi Teachers and Nandi Hekima Saccos are based in the town.

== Education ==
The notable educational institutions in this town are Kapsabet High School, Kapsabet Girls High School, Janeth Jepkosgei Shoe4Africa School, and University of Eastern Africa Baraton.

It also has a few colleges, and teacher's training institutions are very common.

== Health ==
Major hospitals are Kapsabet County Referral Hospital, Nandi Hills hospital and St Francisca Hospital.

== Sport ==
Many successful long distance runners have been born in or near Kapsabet, including Rodgers Rop, Bernard Lagat, Robert Kipkoech Cheruiyot, Peter Rono, Wilfred Bungei, Pamela Jelimo, Janeth Jepkosgei and Martin Lel. Also from Kapsabet are two members of the 2012 US Olympic Team: Janet Cherobon-Bawcom and Bernard Lagat.

The town plays host to the start of the annual Kass FM Marathon which starts in Kapsabet Town and ends in Eldoret.

== Transport ==
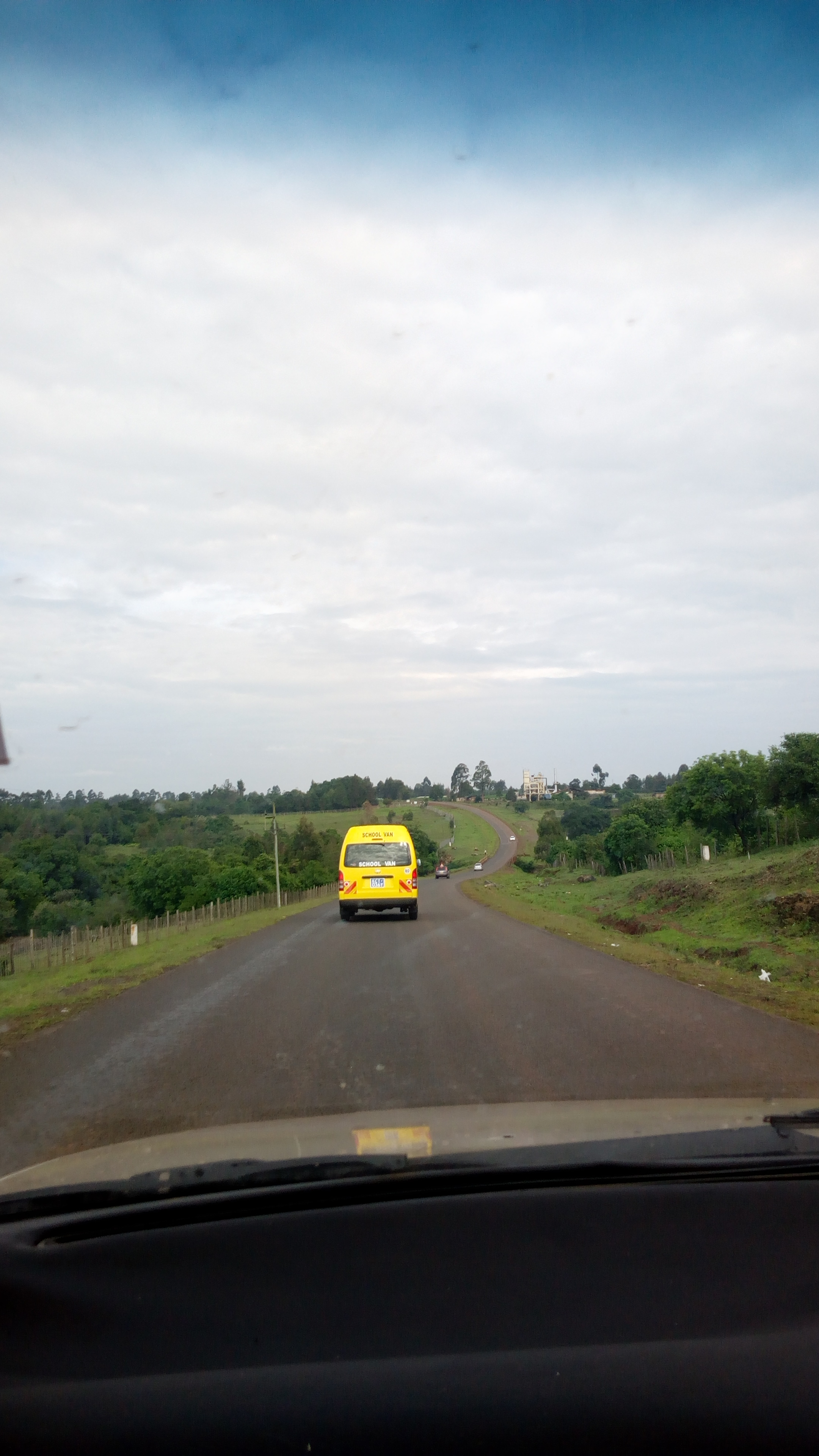
Eldoret-Kapsabet highway

Eldoret International Airport is approximately 30 km away on Kapsabet-Mosoriot-Eldoret Road.

Kapsabet is a connection town for Kisumu, Kakamega, Kericho, Eldoret and Nakuru towns.

== Recent events ==
The town was in the media spotlight in July 2014 when adulterated alcohol killed people in Nandi and Uasin Gishu counties.
