= Stephen Sang =

Kenyan politician

Stephen Kipyego Sang

2nd Governor of Nandi County
- Incumbent
- Assumed office 2017
- Deputy: Yulita Cheruiyot
- Preceded by: Cleophas Lagat

Member of the Senate of Kenya
- In office 2013–2017
- Preceded by: Inaugural officeholder
- Succeeded by: Samson Cherargei
- Constituency: Nandi County
- In office 2022–2027

Personal details
- Born: 1 January 1985 (age 41) Kenya
- Party: United Democratic Alliance
- Spouse: Sheila Sang

Stephen Sang is a Kenyan lawyer and politician who currently serves as the second Governor of Nandi County in Kenya. He previously served as Senator for Nandi County from 2013 to 2017.

== Early life and education ==
Stephen Kipyego Sang was born on 1 January 1985. He attended Kapsabet High School in Nandi County, and the University of Nairobi, where he graduated with Bachelor of Laws in the year 2008.

== Electoral history ==
On August 8, 2017, Sang was elected as the youngest Governor in Kenya at 32, since the adoption of the devolved system in 2010. In 2013 he also made history when he was elected the youngest Senator at 28 in Kenya's inaugural Senate. Sang has recently been at the forefront in condemning drug trafficking in the country terming some politicians beneficiaries of the trade.
