= Governor of Nandi County =

Governor of the Nandi County
- County Governor Standard
- Incumbent; Stephen Sang since 22 August 2017
- Style: His Excellency (formal)
- Member of: County Executive Committee; Budget and Economic Forum; Council of Governors; County Policing Authority
- Appointer: Direct popular vote in Nandi County
- Term length: Five years renewable once
- Inaugural holder: Dr. Cleophas Kiprop Lagat; 27 March 2013
- Salary: KSh. 13,340,000/= (US$140,421) annually

Deputy Governor of the Nandi County
- County Governor Standard
- Incumbent; Dr Yulita Cheruiyot since 22 August 2017
- Style: Her Excellency (formal)
- Member of: County Executive Committee
- Appointer: Direct popular vote in Nandi County as running mate to Governor Candidate
- Term length: Five years renewable once
- Inaugural holder: Dominic Kimutai Chepyagan Biwott; 27 March 2013
- Salary: KSh. 8,750,000/= (US$92,062) annually

The office of the County Governor of Nandi is one of the State Offices in 47 devolved governments in 47 Counties of Kenya. The county governor and the deputy governor are the chief executive and the deputy chief executive of the county. The first Governor of Nandi is Dr. Cleophas Kiprop Lagat who was elected on 4 March 2013 General Election, directly by the registered voters in the county. His deputy is Dominic Chepyagan Biwott who was his running mate. Dr. Lagat appointed, on 3 June 2013, the following 10 County Executive Committee(CEC) Members to representing their departments, in the exercise of the powers conferred to him by Article 179 (2) (b) of the Constitution of Kenya as read with sections 30 (2) (d), (e) and 35 of the County Governments Act, 2012, and upon approval by the Nandi County Assembly in its session. He later on appointed Chief Officers for respective Departments who are by law the accounting and authorized public officers.

== Powers and duties ==
1. Appointment of Members of the County Public Service Board, County Executive Committees and Task forces
2. Appointment of County chief Officers and other officers as per provisions of laws of Kenya
3. Chair of County Executive Committee Meetings
4. Custodian of County Seal and Flag
5. County Honors, Awards and Reception
6. Boundaries
7. Protection of the county's interest
8. Direct and control functions of Departments
9. Veto county assembly approvals as per the constitution

== County secretary and Other Members of Nandi County Public Service Board ==
Mr. Francis Angueyah Ominde was appointed as the first County Secretary and Head of Public Service of Nandi by the Governor of Nandi on 14 August 2013 alongside the following other members of Nandi County Public Service Board, in the exercise of the powers conferred to him by article 235 (1) of the Constitution as read with section 57 and 58 (1) (b), (c), (2), (3) and (4) of the County Governments Act, 2012, and upon approval by the Nandi County Assembly;

Member Name	Designation
Samuel Kipkemboi Too	Chairman, Public Service Board
Esther Chelagat Keter	Secretary, Public Service Board
Grace Jepchirchir Sugut	Member, Public Service Board
Mary Chepkemboi Ngeny	Member, Public Service Board
Kimeli Chepsiror	Member, Public Service Board
Francis Kipkemboi Sang	Member, Public Service Board
Sammy Kipchirchir Sareto	Member, Public Service Board

== CEC Members Chief Officers appointments ==
The Governor and the deputy are also part of the county executive committee which is established in Article 179(2) (a)of the Constitution of Kenya. As per the laws of the Republic of Kenya, particularly Article 183 of the Constitution and section 36(1) of the County Governments Act, CEC Members are charged with the following responsibilities;

1. Implementing county legislation
2. Implement, within the county, national legislation to the extent that the legislation so requires;
3. Manage and coordinate the functions of the county administration and its departments;
4. Supervise the administration and delivery of services in the county and all decentralized units and agencies in the county;
5. The county executive committee may prepare proposed legislation for consideration by the county assembly; and they shall also provide the county assembly with full and regular reports on matters relating to the county.

CEC Member's Names	Chief Officer's Name	Department
Patrick K.Sang	Emily Sigot	Youth, Gender, Sports and Social Services
Mary Jerubet Ngelechei	Willy K Too	Agriculture, Livestock and Fisheries Development
James Kipchoge Kijo	Mrs. Elzeba J Arusei	Tourism, Culture and Co-operative Development
Paul Kipchoge Rop	Mary Tanui	Education, Research and Vocational Training
Rosemary Chemeli Korir	Peter Too	Transport and Infrastructure
John Kipkorir Chumo	David Kosgey	Land, Environment and Natural Resources
Mathew Rotich Kiprono	Dr. Edward Serem	Health and Sanitation
Consolata Chepkorir Kuto	Julius Koech	Devolved Units and Special Programmes
Charles Kimeli Muge	H.M.Koech-Finance&John Lelei-ICT	Finance and Economic Planning
Josiah Kiprotich Korir	Jacob Sisey	Trade, Investment and Industrial Development

== CEC Reshuffles ==
Rosemary Chemeli Korir was later transferred to the Department of Education, Research and Vocational Training. Mr. Josiah Kiprotich Korir was mentioned alongside Henry Maritim Koech as among the 175 persons listed by the Ethics and Anti Corruption Commission in a report tabled in Parliament on and therefore had to step aside to pave way for investigations on impropriety of public funds in the fencing of markets by the County Government. The Deputy Governor H.E Biwott has been acting as CEC Member for Trade, Investment and Industrial Development while Mr. Charles Kimeli Muge has been the acting CEC Member for Transport and Infrastructure. Paul Kipchoge Rop was later transferred by the Governor to the Department of Tourism, Culture and Cooperative Development after he had sacked Mr. James Kipchoge Kijo allegations of impropriety in his department. Mr James Kipchoge Kijo has since been replaced by Mr. Style K.A Kessio who hails from Terik Ward in Aldai Sub County.

== Chief Officer's Reshuffles ==
Mr. Peter Kimeli Too who was the first Chief Officer for Transport and Infrastructure was sacked by the Governor and replaced by a little known Eng. Alex Buguit who has since been handling the problems arising from delayed payments of contractors during Too's tenure.

== Other Offices of the County Governor ==
=== Advisors, Chief of Staff and other support staff to the County Governor ===
The Transition Authority together with the Public Service Commission in consultation with the Council of Governors and the Salaries and Remuneration Commission approved the creation of a cadre of five staff to be known as advisors to the Governors. Also three support staff was approved for each Governor. These staff exists as advisors and not as executives or administrators in the hierarchy of the County Government. It is ultra vires the Kenyan laws for these staff to issue directives of a binding nature unless they are communicating the Governor's message or providing information to facilitate decision-making. The Governor of Nandi has Legal Advisor, Political Advisor, Economic Advisor, Chief of Staff and other support staff in line with this approval.
