= Cleophas Lagat =

Kenyan politician

Governor of Nandi County
- In office 2013–2017
- Deputy: Dominic Biwott
- Preceded by: Inaugural Holder
- Succeeded by: Stephen Sang

Cleophas Lagat is a Kenyan politician and the former Governor of Nandi County, who served from 2013 to 2017. He joined politics after resigning as the Principal of Eldoret Polytechnic in 2012. He had previously held other positions in Kenyan tertiary colleges. He was succeeded by Stephen Sang.
