= Mosop Constituency =

Kenyan electoral constituency

Mosop Constituency is an electoral constituency in Kenya. It is one of six constituencies of Nandi County. The constituency was established for the 1966 elections. The constituency has seven wards, all electing Members of County Assembly (MCAs) for the Nandi County Assembly.

== Members of Parliament ==
Elections	MP	Party	Notes
1966	Hon Gerald Nathaniel Kalya	KANU	Multi-party.
1969	Hon Gerald Nathaniel Kalya	KANU	One-party system, de facto.
1974	Hon Robert Tiongoi arap Tanui	KANU	One-party system, de facto.
1979	Hon Stanley Kiptoo Metto	KANU	One-party system, de facto.
1983	Hon Stanley Kiptoo Metto	KANU	One-party system, de jure.
1988	Hon Robert Tiongoi arap Tanui	KANU	One-party system, de jure, mlolongo system of election deployed.
1990	Hon Benjamin Kiprono Kositany	KANU	By-elections, One-party system.
1992	Hon John Kipkorir Sambu	KANU	Multi-party.
1997	Hon John Kipkorir Sambu	KANU	Multi-party.
2002	Hon John Kipkorir Sambu	KANU	Multi-party.
2007	Hon David Koech	ODM	Multi-party.
2013	Hon Stephen Kirwa Bitok	URP	Multi-party.
2017	Hon Vincent Kipkurui Tuwei	Jubilee Party	Multi-party.
2022	Hon Abraham Kirwa	UDA	Multi-party.

== Wards ==
Wards
Ward	Area Sq. km	Registered Voters
Kabisaga	78.80	19,029
Kabiyet	77.20	19,262
Kipkaren	93.90	19,147
Kurgung / Surungai	82.20	18,225
Ndalat	75.10	18,651
Sangalo	121.10	21,390
Total	601.60	134,648
*September 2005.
