= Emgwen Constituency =

Electoral consistuency in Kenya

Emgwen Constituency is an electoral constituency in Kenya. It is one of six constituencies of Nandi County. The constituency was established for the 1997 elections.

== Members of Parliament ==
Elections	MP	Party	Notes
1997	Joseph T. A. Leting	KANU	
2002	Stephen Kipkiyeny Tarus	NARC	
2007	Elijah Lagat	ODM	
2013	Alexander Kosgey	URP	
2017	Alexander Kosgey	JP	
2022	Josses Lelmengit	UDA	

== Wards ==
Wards
Ward	Area Sq. Km	Registered Voters	Local Authority
Chepkumia	87.00	21,283	Nandi North County
Kapkangani	43.20	23,994	Nandi North County
Kapsabet	74.50	35,962	Kapsabet municipality
Kilibwoni	163.70	48,845	Nandi North County
Total	368.40	130,084	
*September 2005.
