= Kaptumo =

- Location within Kenya
- Coordinates: 0.07°N 35.07°E
- Country: Kenya
- Province: Rift Valley Province
- Time zone: UTC+3 (EAT)

Kaptumo is a settlement in Kenya's Rift Valley Province in Nandi County.
