= Tinderet Constituency =

Electoral constituency of Nandi County, Kenya

Tinderet
- constituency for the Parliament of Kenya
- Tinderet Constituency within Nandi County

- Nandi County within Kenya
- County: Nandi
- Population: 115,931
- Area: 557 km^{2} (215.1 sq mi)

Current constituency
- Number of members: 1
- Party: UDA
- Member of Parliament: Julius Kibiwott Meli
- Wards: 4

Tinderet Constituency is an electoral constituency in Kenya. It is one of six constituencies of Nandi County (formerly Nandi District). The constituency was established for the 1966 elections. It has recently been delimited to create two new constituencies after the parliamentary approval, the newly created constituencies are Tinderet and Nandi Hills.

== Members of Parliament ==
Elections	MP	Party	Notes
1966	Marie-Jean Seroney	KANU	
1969	Marie-Jean Seroney	KANU	One-party system
1974	Marie-Jean Seroney	KANU	One-party system
1976	Gerald Nathaniel Kalya	KANU	By-elections, One-party system
1979	Henry Kiprono Kosgey	KANU	One-party system
1983	Henry Kiprono Kosgey	KANU	One-party system
1988	Kimaiyo Keronei arap Sego	KANU	One-party system
1992	Henry Kiprono Kosgey	KANU	
1997	Henry Kiprono Kosgey	KANU	
2002	Henry Kiprono Kosgey	KANU	
2007	Henry Kiprono Kosgey	ODM	
2013-2017	Julius Kibiwott Melly	URP	under 2010 constitution
2017-2022	Julius Kibiwott Melly	Jubilee	

== Wards ==
Ward	Area Sq. Km	Registered Voters	Local Authority
Soghor / Soba	192.50	39,934	Tinderet
Tinderet	159.20	27,896	Tinderet
Chemelil/Chemase	140.11	12000	Nandi Hills
Kapsimotwa	161.30	17,818	Nandi Hills
Total	580.90	105,044	Nandi
*September 2005.
