= Kabiyet =

- Location within Kenya
- Coordinates: 0.4°N 35.08°E
- Country: Kenya
- Province: Rift Valley Province
- Time zone: UTC+3 (EAT)

Kabiyet is a settlement in Kenya's Rift Valley Province.
