= Samson Cherarkey =

Kenyan politician

Honourable Samson Kiprotich Cherargei Senator

Member of the Kenyan Parliament
- Incumbent
- Assumed office August 2017

Samson Kiprotich Cherargei is a Kenyan politician who is the current senator representing Nandi County in the senate of Kenya.

== Education ==
Cherarkey attended Cheptarit Primary School, Mosoriot from 1996 to 2002 for his primary education and later proceeded to Kapsabet Boysʼ High School, Nandi for his secondary education in the year 2003 to 2006. He then attended the prestigious School of Law of Moi University, Eldoret, and graduated in 2011 with a Bachelor of Laws (LLB) honours. He immediately enrolled at the Kenya School of Law for his Post Graduate Diploma in Law and subsequently qualified as an advocate of the High Court of Kenya.
