= Nandi County =

- County
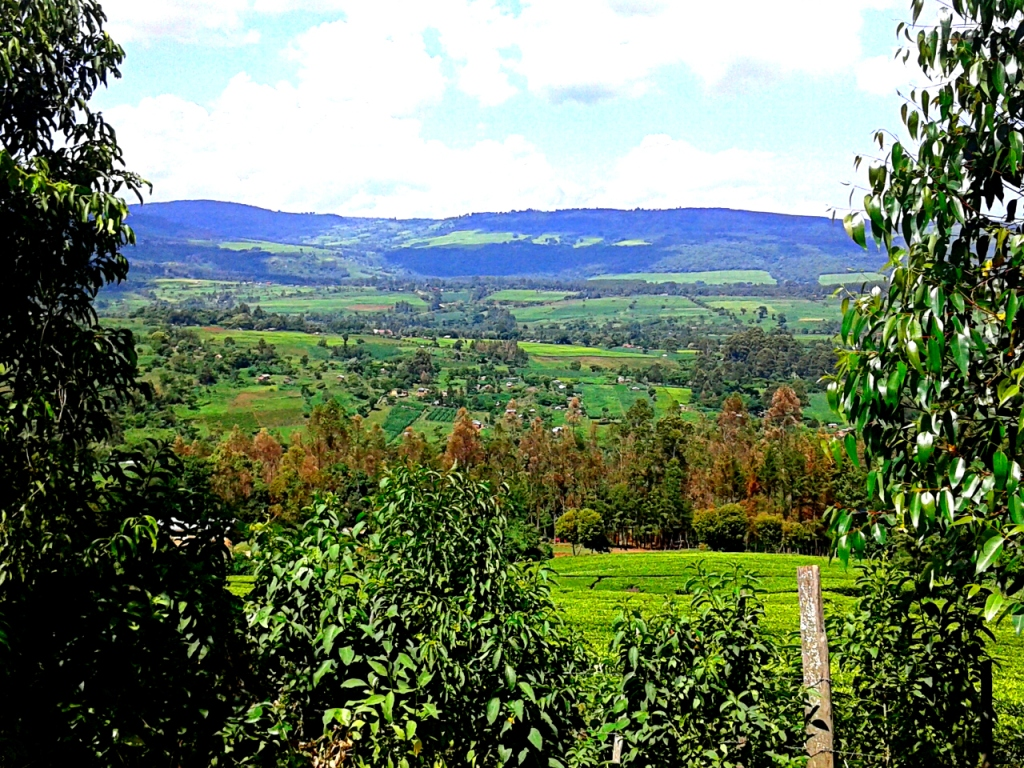
- Nandi Hills

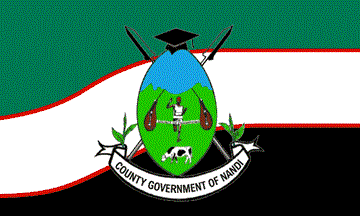
- Flag

- Location in Kenya
- Coordinates: 0.166667°N 35.15°E
- Country: Kenya
- Formed: 4 March 2013
- Capital and largest town: Kapsabet

Government
  - Governor: Stephen Sang
  - The Senate: Samson Cherargei

Area
  - Total: 2,884.5 km^{2} (1,113.7 sq mi)

Population (2019)
  - Total: 885,711
  - Density: 307.06/km^{2} (795.28/sq mi)
- Time zone: UTC+3 (EAT)
- Website: nandi.go.ke

Nandi County is a county in Kenya in the North Rift, occupying an area of 2,884.4 square kilometres. Its capital, Kapsabet, is the largest town in the county while other towns include Mosoriot, Tinderet, Kobujoi, Kaiboi, Kabiyet and Nandi Hills. According to a 2019 census, the county has a population of 885,711, made up of a number of Kenyan communities, the majority of whom belong to the native tribe called Nandi.

Geographically, the unique jug-shaped structure of Nandi County is bound by the Equator to the south and extends northwards to latitude 0034’N. The western boundary extends to west. The county's major area is covered by the Nandi Hills.

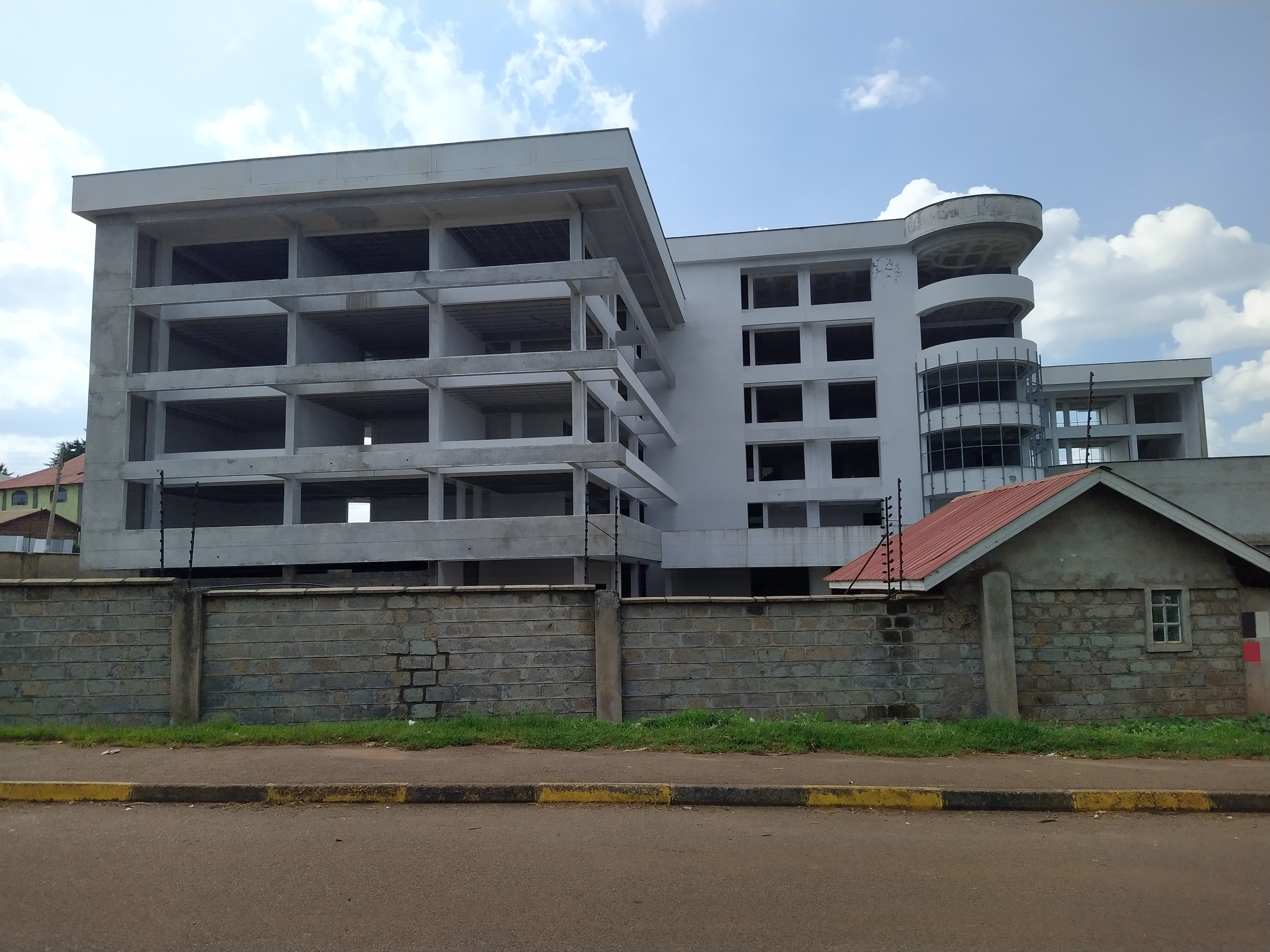
The upcoming Nandi County Assembly Headquarters (June 2021)

== History ==
Historically, Nandi like other Kalenjin areas was divided into districts known as emotinwek (sing. emet). There were six emotinwek in Nandi which were Wareñg in the north, Mosop in the East, Soiin (also known as Pelkut) in the south-east, Aldai and Chesumei in the west and Em'gwen in the center.

The districts were further divided into divisions known as bororiōsiek (sing. bororiet) which were made up of several villages known as koret.

=== Settlement ===
The traditional Nandi account is that the first settlers in Nandi came from Elgon and formed the Kipoiis clan; a name that possibly means 'the spirits'. They were led by a man named Kakipoch, founder of the Nandi section of the Kalenjin and are said to have settled in the emet of Aldai in south-western Nandi. One of the early Nandi bororiōsiek was named after Kakipoch.

Studies of the settlement pattern indicate that the southern regions were the first to be settled. As of 1910, these comprised the emet of Aldai on the west and the, by then annexed, emet of Soiin on the east. It was conjectured that the first pororiosiek were Kakipoch in Aldai and Tuken in Soiin.

It is notable that Sirikwa holes (known to the Nandi as mukowanisiek) were almost non-existent in the areas first settled, being only present on the Nandi Escarpment itself. They were however found in great numbers in the northern regions of Nandi.

Inward migrants and general population growth are thought to have led to a northward expansion of the growing identity during the eighteenth century. This period is thought to have seen the occupation and establishment of the emotinwek of Chesume, Emgwen and Masop. This period would also have seen the establishment of more pororosiek.

The final expansion occurred during the middle of the nineteenth century when the Nandi took the Uain Gishu plateau from the Uasin Gishu. Traditions contained in the tale of Tapkendi however seem to indicate that the plateau was previously held by the Nandi and that Nandi place names were superseded by Maasai names. This is further evidenced by certain "Masai place-names in eastern Nandi which indicate that the Masai had temporary possession of strip of Nandi roughly five miles wide", these include Ndalat, Lolkeringeti, Nduele and Ol-lesos, which were by the early nineteenth century in use by the Nandi as koret names.

=== Late 19th century ===
Nandi county was the scene of the resistance struggle that has come to be known as the Nandi Resistance. The traditional system of governance came to an end c.1905 with the end of the resistance struggle. This was followed by the subsequent absorption of Nandi into the East African Protectorate in 1905 and later into the Kenya Colony in 1920.

The Emet of Wareng was merged into the Uasin Gishu district during the colonial period. It is today part of Uasin Gishu County and last bore its name as a county of Eldoret South Constituency. The Emet of Soiin would be appropriated for European occupation, as part of what were known as the white highlands, during the colonial period. It was later split in two and is today named after the Tinderet and Nandi Hills.

== Population ==
Historical population
Year	Pop.	±%
1979	299,319	—
1989	433,613	+44.9%
1999	578,751	+33.5%
2009	752,965	+30.1%
2019	885,711	+17.6%

=== Religion ===
Religion in Nandi County

Religion (2019 Census)	Number
Catholicism	216,901
Protestant	401,975
Evangelical Churches	153,342
African instituted Churches	49,849
Orthodox	14,936
Other Christian	21,776
Islam	5,755
Hindu	90
Traditionists	630
Other	7,580
No Religion	10,002
Don't Know	749
Not Stated	58

== Sub-counties ==
The county has six subcounties:

- Mosop Subcounty
- Emgwen Subcounty
- Aldai Subcounty
- Tinderet Subcounty
- Nandi Hills Subcounty
- Chesumei Subcounty

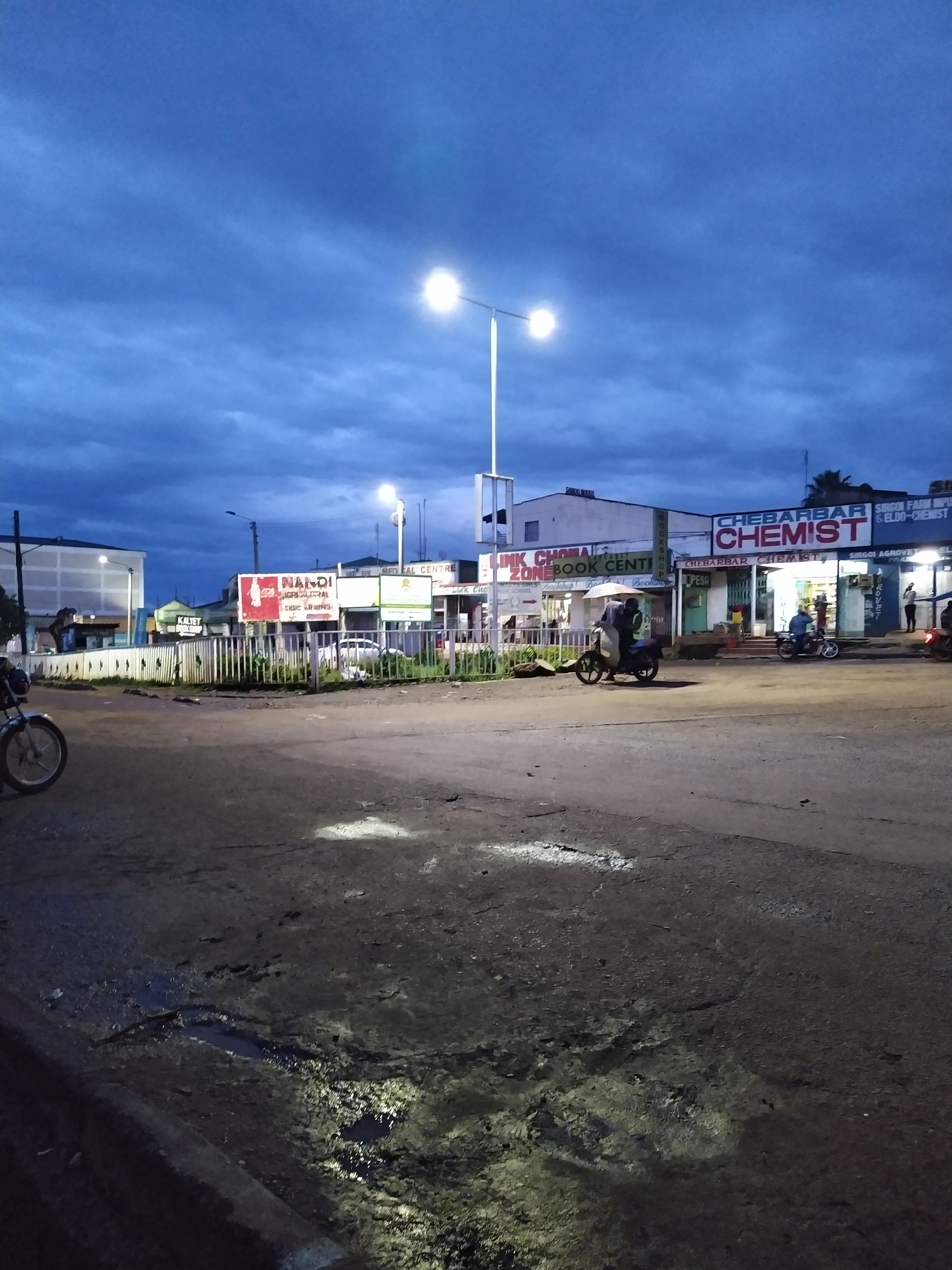
Kapsabet Town at night

=== Wards ===
The county (2,884.5 km^{2} or 1,113.7 sq mi) is further sub-divided into 30 wards namely:

Ward	Area		2009 pop.
Ward	km^{2}	sq. mi.	2009 pop.
Songhor/Soba	193	75	39,934
Tindiret	159	61	27,896
Chemelil/Chemase	128	49	14,479
Kapsimotwo	73	28	18,362
Kabwareng	47	18	22,807
Terik	48	19	20,456
Kemeloi	115	44	35,085
Kobujoi	81	31	26,539
Kaptumo/Kaboi	98	38	24,464
Koyo/Ndurio	69	27	19,905
Nandi Hills	74	29	33,545
Chepkunyuk	129	50	36,775
Ol'lessos	68	26	19,396
Kapchorua	161	62	17,818
Chemundu/Kapng'etuny	52	20	25,403
Kosirai	93	36	25,741
Lelmokwo/Ngechek	106	41	23,354
Kaptel/Kamoiywo	150	58	31,375
Kiptuiya	71	27	24,879
Chepkumia	87	34	21,283
Kapkangani	43	17	23,994
Kapsabet	75	29	35,962
Kilibwoni	164	63	48,845
Chepterwai	73	28	18,944
Kipkaren	94	36	19,147
Kurgung/Surungai	82	32	18,225
Kabiyet	77	30	19,262
Ndalat	75	29	18,651
Kabisaga	79	31	19,029
Sangalo/Kebulonik	121	47	21,390

=== Constituencies ===
The county consists of six constituencies: 151. Tinderet, 152. Aldai, 153. Nandi Hills, 154. Chesumei, 155. Emgwen, 156. Mosop.

== Economy ==
The county is part of the Lake Region Economic Bloc (LREB) established in 2018 to foster regional economic, industrial, social, and technological collaboration.

=== Agriculture ===
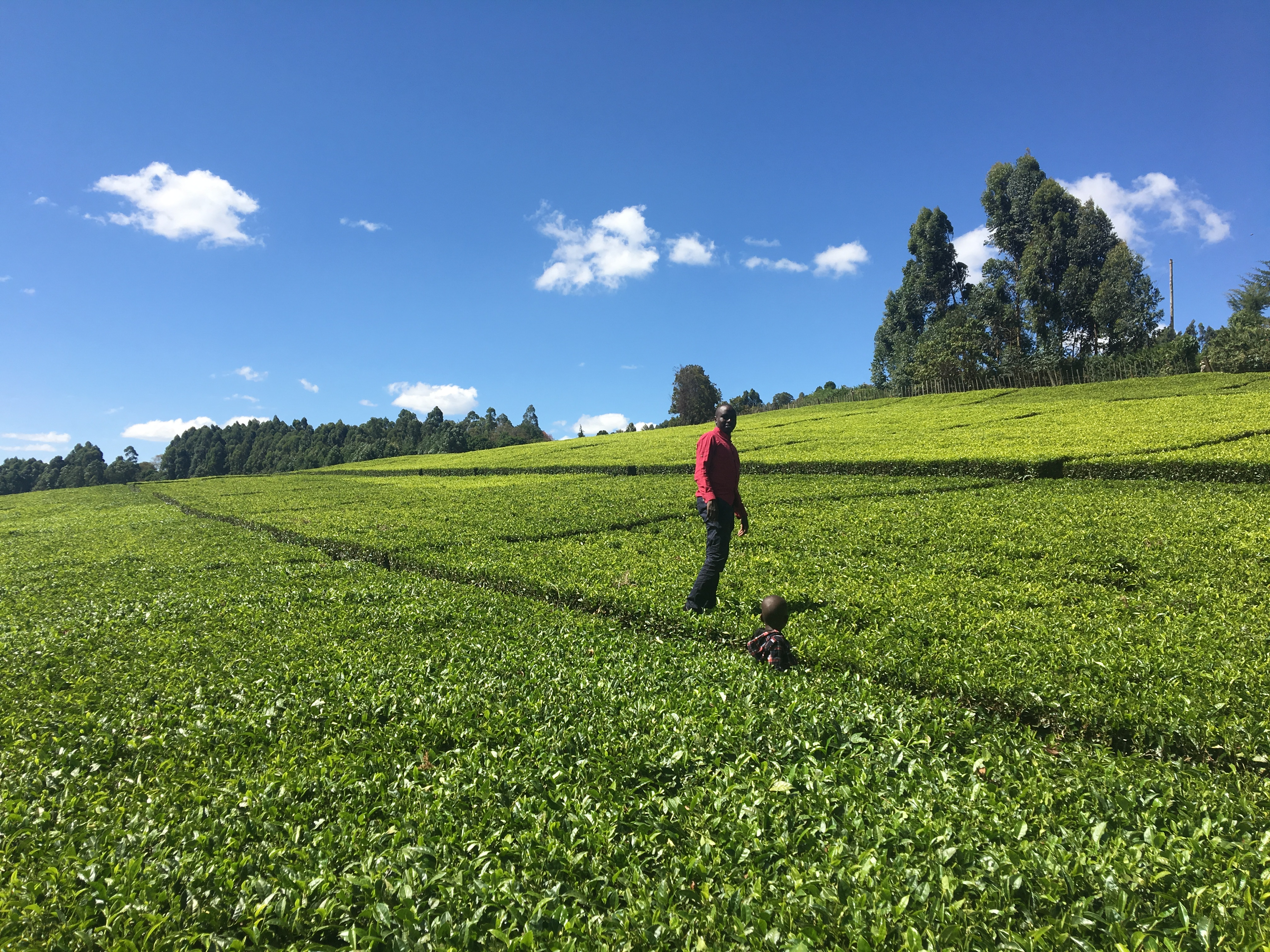
A man and boy in the field

Agriculture is the backbone of Nandi County’s economy, supported by fertile volcanic soils and a cool, wet climate. The main crops are tea and maize, alongside dairy farming. The county hosts about 15–19 tea factories, many under the Kenya Tea Development Agency (KTDA), with catchments like Kaptumo supporting over 7,700 growers on 2,140 hectares. Daily green-leaf production often exceeds local processing capacity, leading to calls for more factories. Maize is grown widely as both staple and cash crop, with farmers benefiting from county-backed insurance schemes. Dairy farming is highly developed, with about 320,000 dairy cows producing nearly 195 million litres annually, valued at KSh 5.9 billion.

=== Agro-processing ===
Value addition has become a key economic priority.

- Tea: Over a dozen KTDA and multinational factories process green leaf, though capacity remains below production levels.
- Dairy: The Nandi Dairy Cooperative Union (NDCU), formed in 2016, aggregates milk through 45 coolers with a chilling capacity of 300,000 litres. In 2025, the county under Governor Stephen Sang opened the Kabiyet Milk Processing Plant (Nandi Cooperative Creameries), a KSh 1.2 billion facility with a 200,000 litre/day capacity and an Ultra-High Temperature (UHT) line, enabling production of long-life milk for regional and international markets.
- Poultry: A semi-automated slaughterhouse in Kapsabet, supported by the World Bank’s NARIGP project, processes up to 500 birds per hour, offering poultry farmers (many women and youth) a stable market.
- Garments: The Nandi Textile Unit (NaTeX), based in Mosoriot, Chesumei Sub-County, specializes in producing premium garments including uniforms, cultural attire, and ready-to-wear fashion. Equipped with modern machinery and staffed by skilled local artisans, the plant provides hundreds of jobs—particularly for women and youth—while promoting value addition and local economic empowerment. It is positioning Nandi as a regional hub for textile manufacturing.

=== Tourism ===
Tourism is an emerging sector, leveraging Nandi’s scenic highlands, tea estates, and cultural heritage. Attractions include the Nandi Hills, known for scenic landscapes and tea tours; Chepkiit Waterfalls; and cultural sites such as the Nandi Bears Club golf course and memorials linked to Koitalel arap Samoei, a celebrated anti-colonial leader. Adventure tourism and eco-tourism potential remain underdeveloped but are recognized by the county as future growth areas.

== Notable destinations ==
=== Nandi Hills town and the surrounding region ===
Home to a number of tea estates as well as the Koitalel Samoei Museum, Kapsimotwa Gardens and the Nandi Bears Club.

=== Koitalel arap Samoei mausoleum and museum ===
Koitalel Arap Samoei Museum was instituted in commemoration of Koitalel arap Samoei, a traditional spiritual leader of the Nandi. It incorporates a mausoleum as well as a center that display of the cultural heritage of the larger Kalenjin community.

=== Keben ===
The area is home to the Ngabunat caves, the site of ancient battles between the Nandi and Maasai – one of which led to the capture of Moki chebo Cheplabot and establishment of the second Orkoinotet.

=== Nandi rock ===
This, is the most prominent rock formation along the whole length of the Nandi (Nyando) Escarpment, is a 30-minute walk from the KWS post at Kaptumek.

=== Chepkiit Waterfall (Mlango Water Falls) ===
Located two kilometres from Eldoret International Airport, off the Eldoret-Kapsabet road, Chepkiit Waterfall offers visitors views of the waterfall and local landscape.

== Education and sports ==
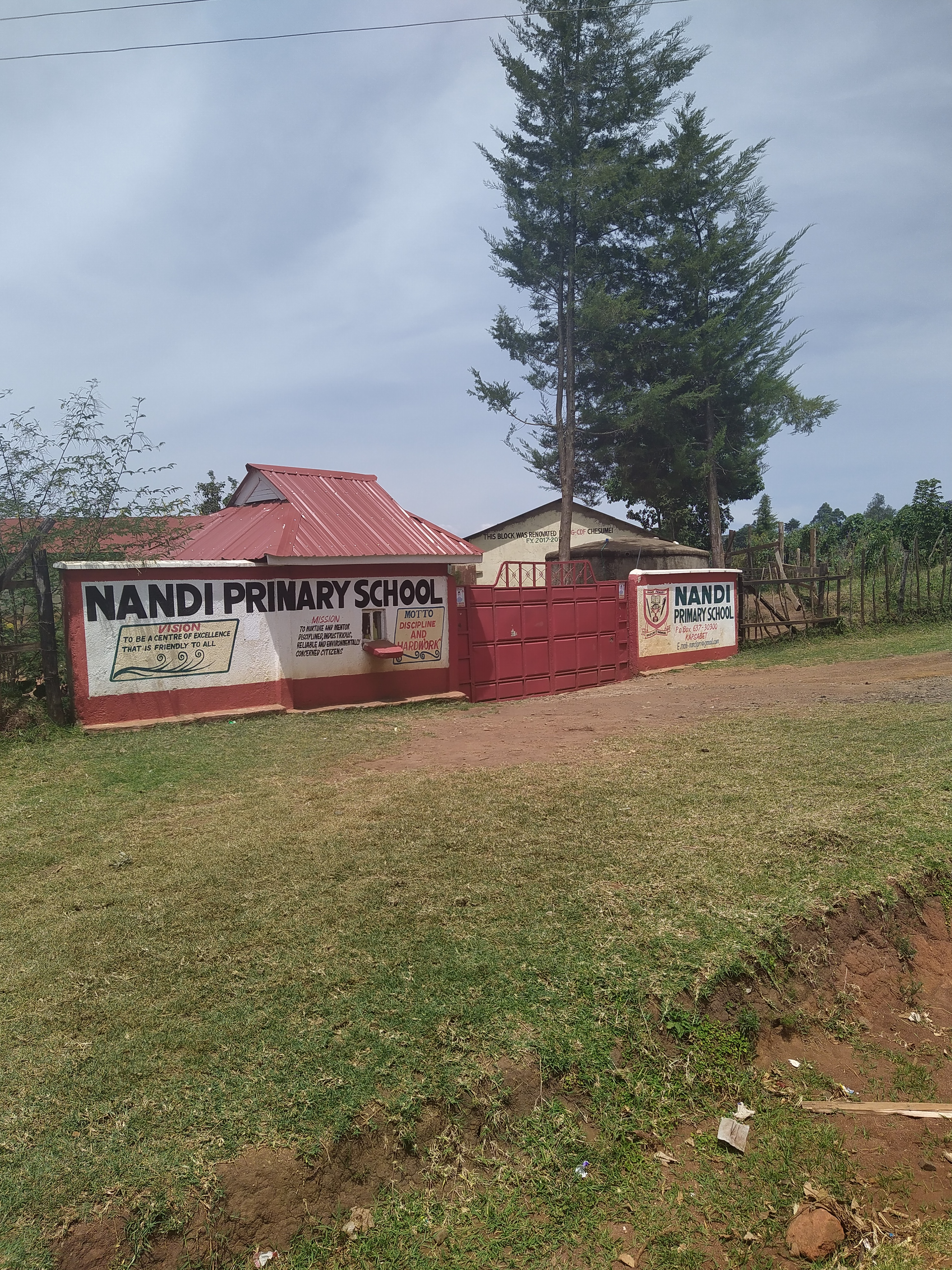
Nandi Primary School in Kapsabet

Nandi County is home to many world record holders in athletics, including Kipchoge Keino, Henry Rono, Eliud Kipchoge, Pamela Jelimo, Janeth Jepkosgei, Moses Tanui, Julius Yego, Jairus Birech, Simon Kipleting, Conseslus Kipruto and Bernard Lagat.

There are 443 primary education schools and 80 secondary education schools in Nandi.

Kapsabet Boys High school, situated in Kapsabet and founded in 1925, is a prominent national school. Its list of alumni includes cabinet ministers such as Nicholas Biwott, Kipruto Arap Kirwa, Henry Kosgey and William Arap Ruto who is currently the Kenyan President. Sports stars such as Julius Yego went here and a former President of Kenya, Daniel Arap Moi.

== Health ==
There are three hospitals, 45 dispensaries, and 9 health care centers in Nandi. It has a doctor to population ratio of 1:94,000

== Exteran link ==
- Media related to Nandi County at Wikimedia Commons
