= Nairobi =

Capital and largest city of Kenya

Nairobi Jiji la Nairobi (Swahili)
- Consolidated city-county
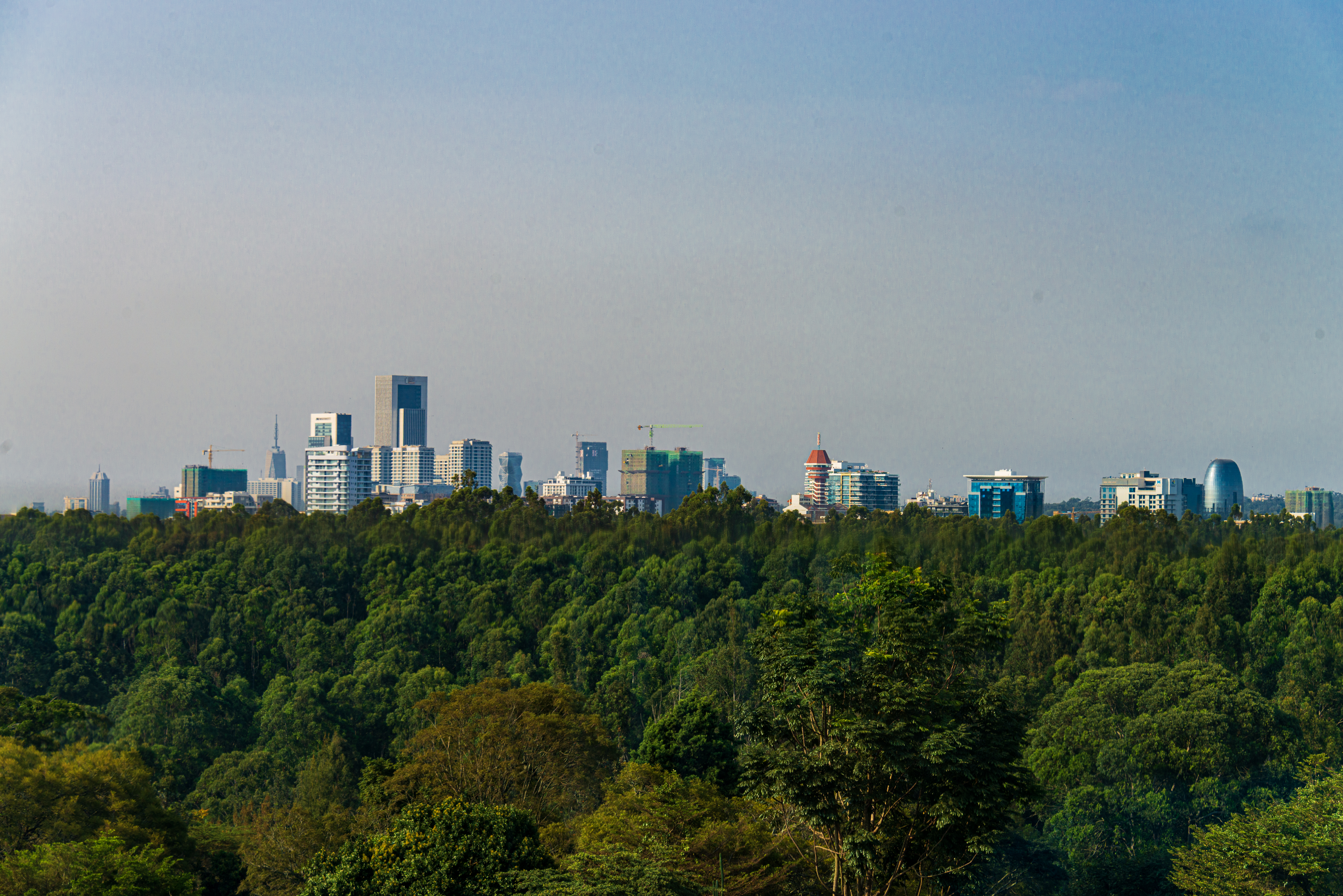
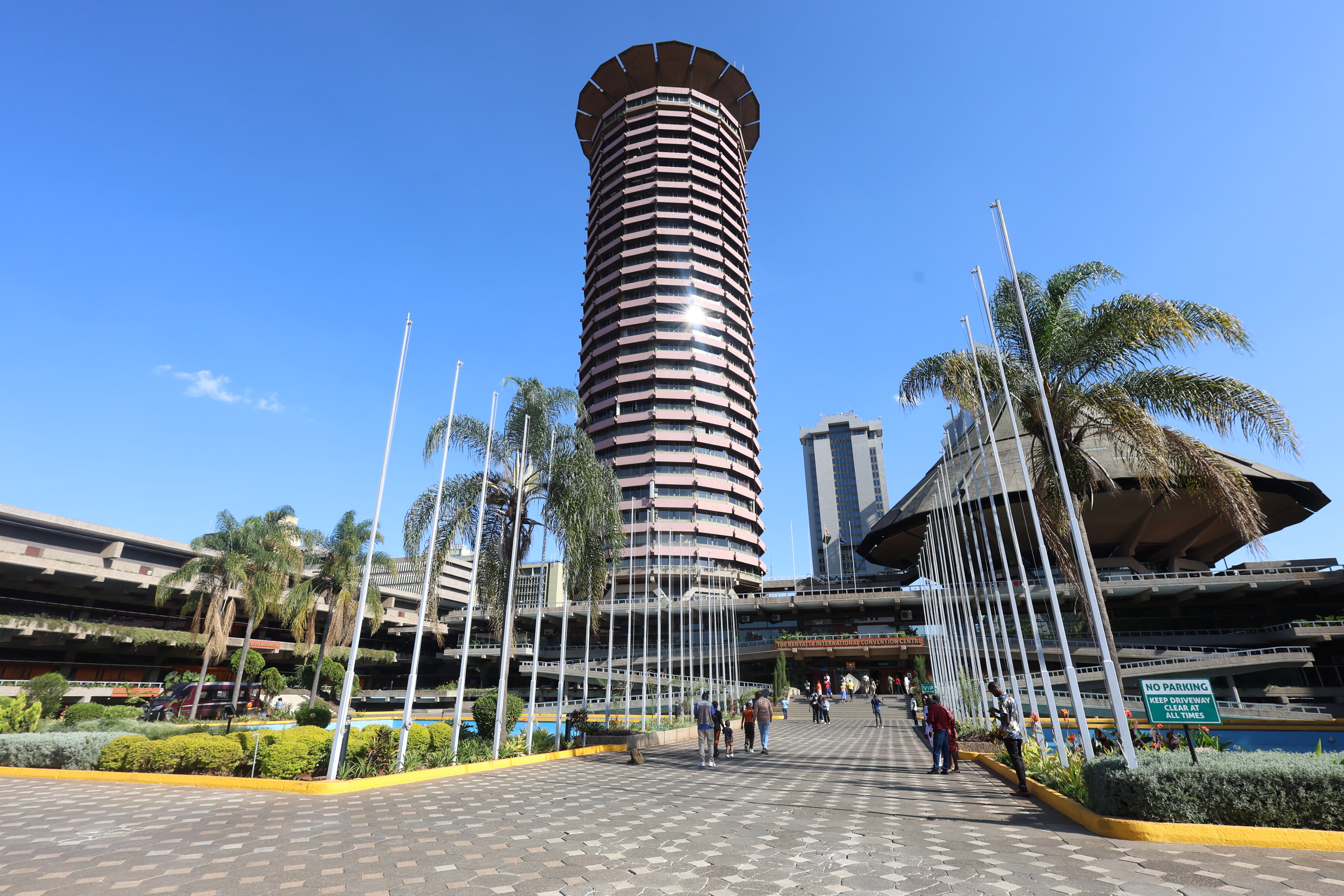
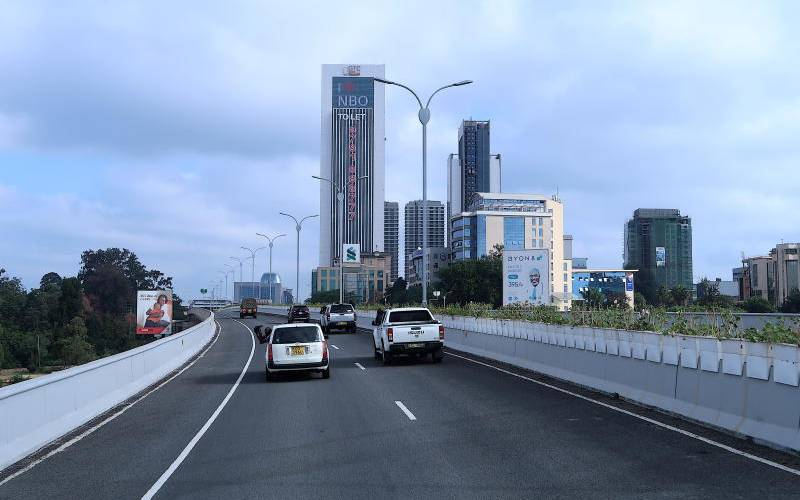
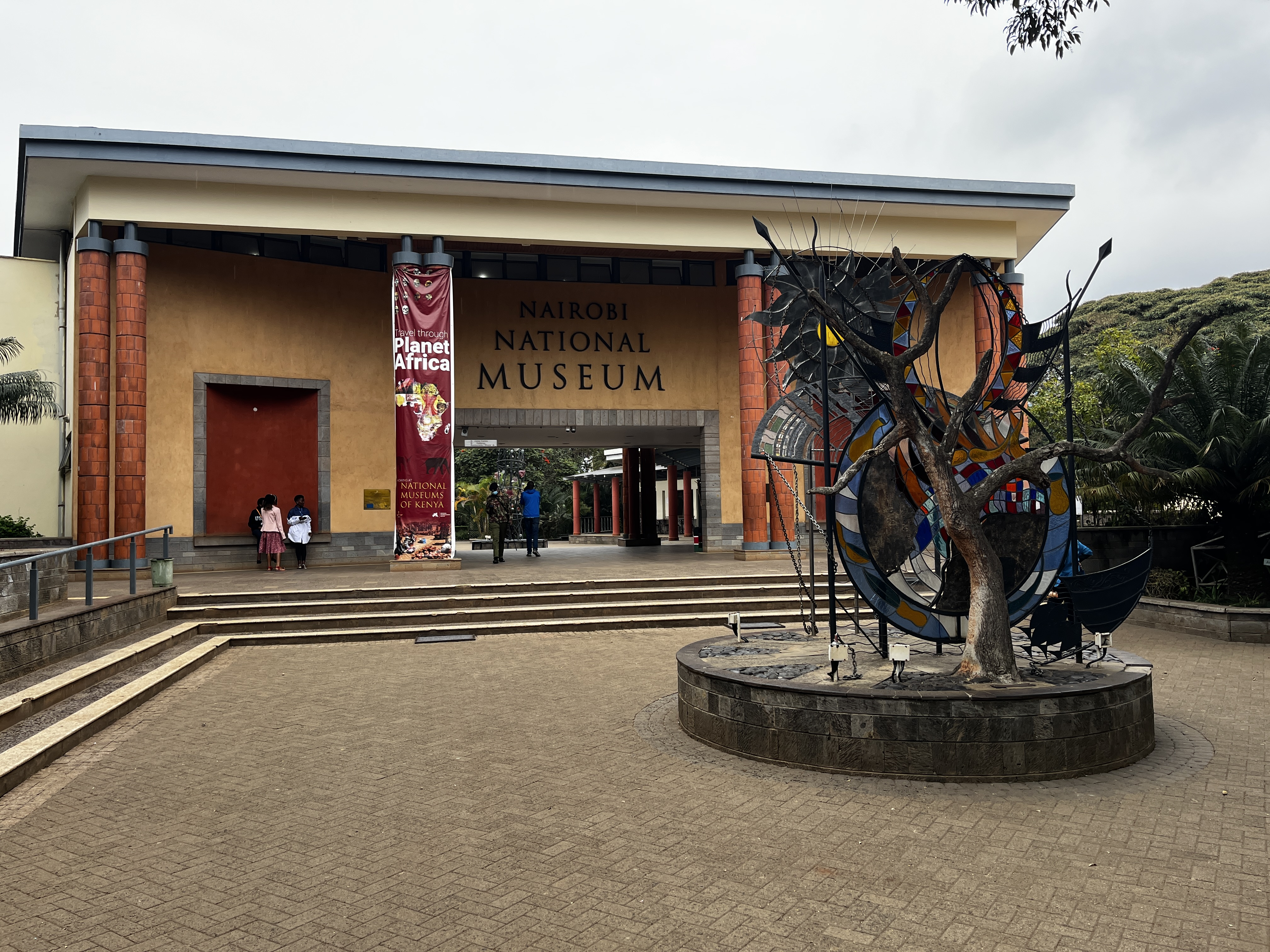
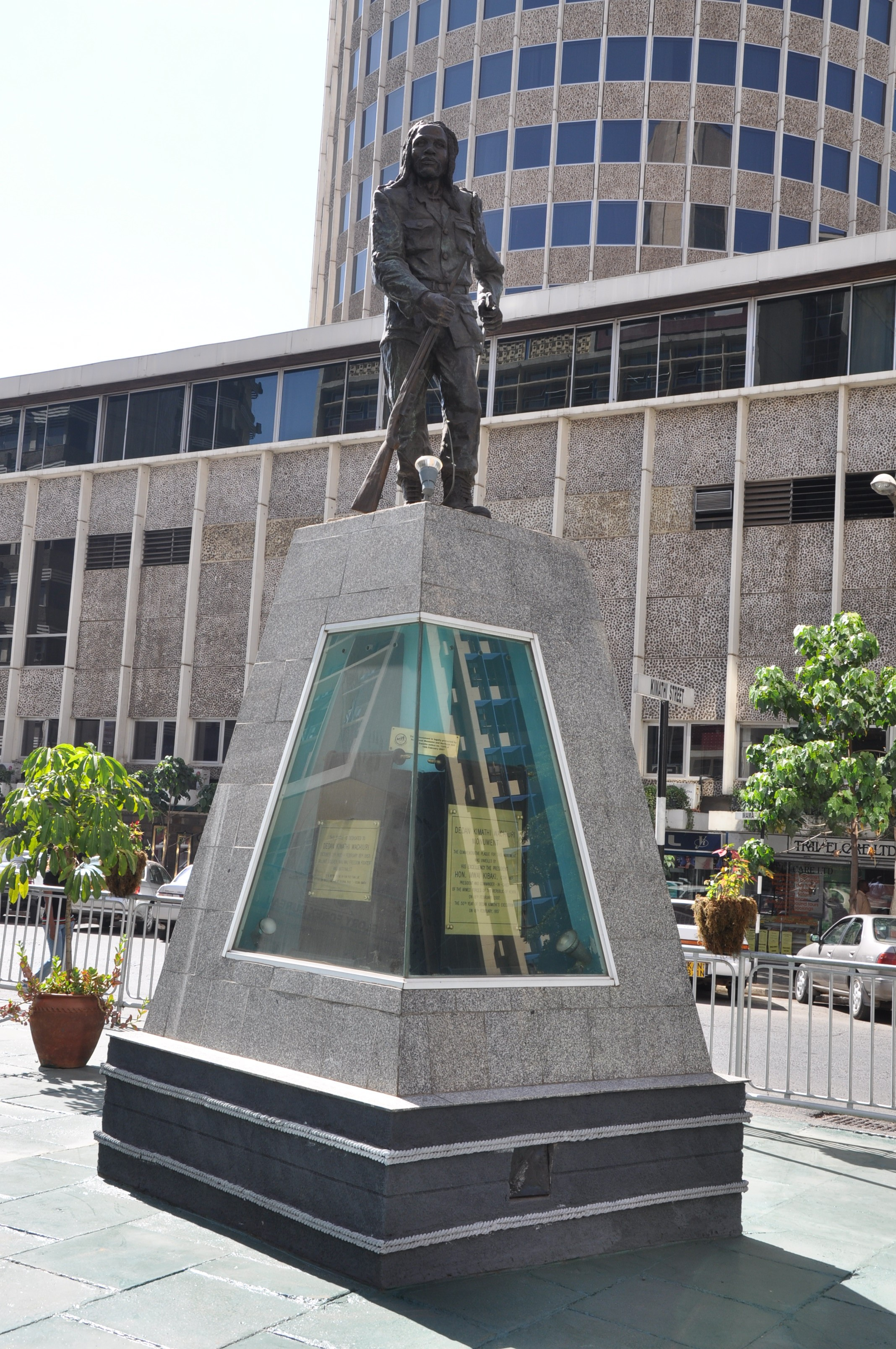
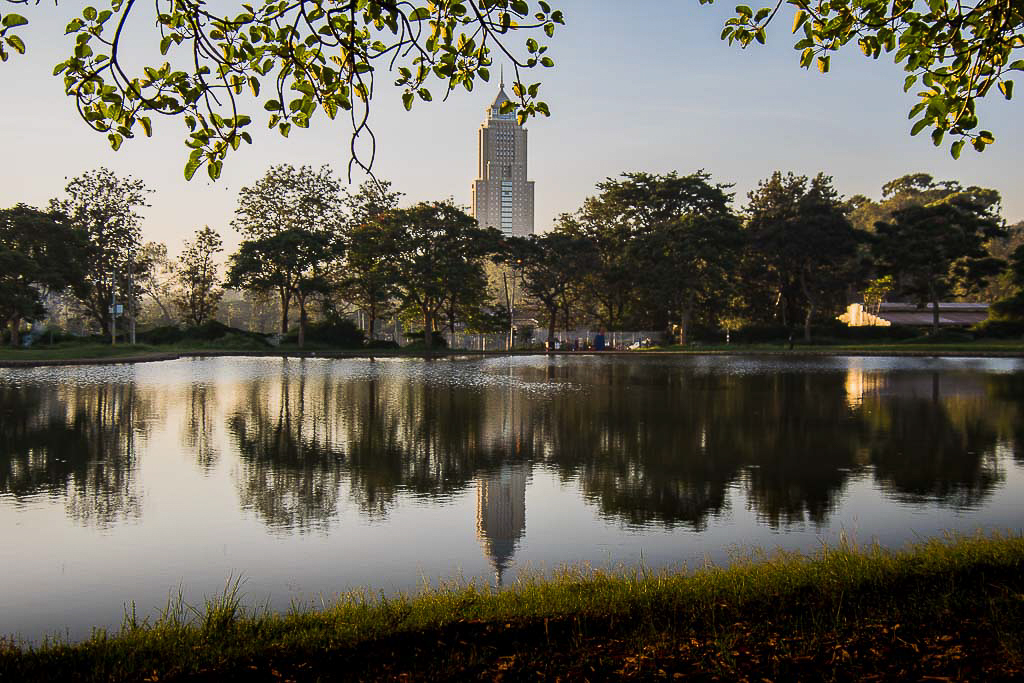
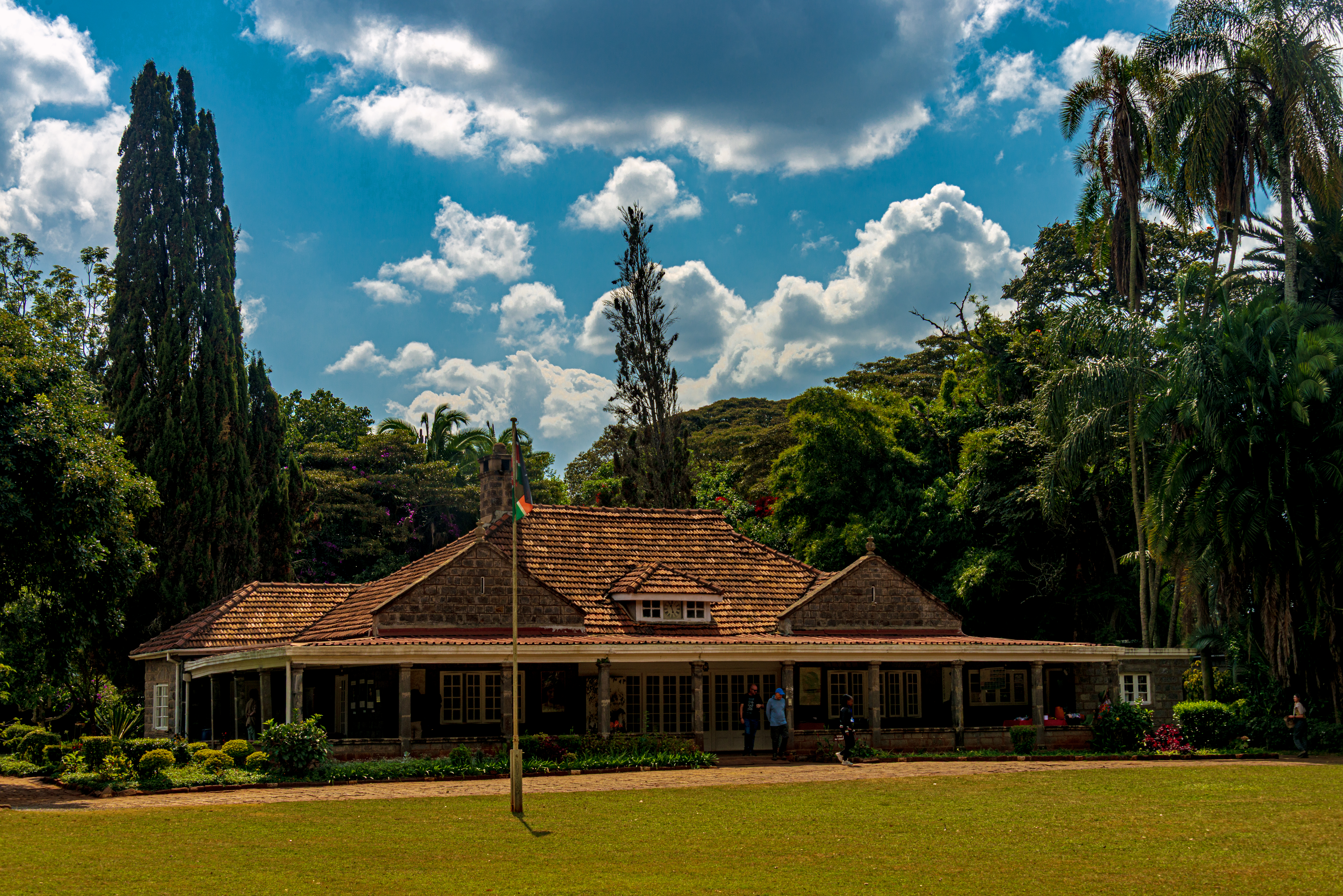
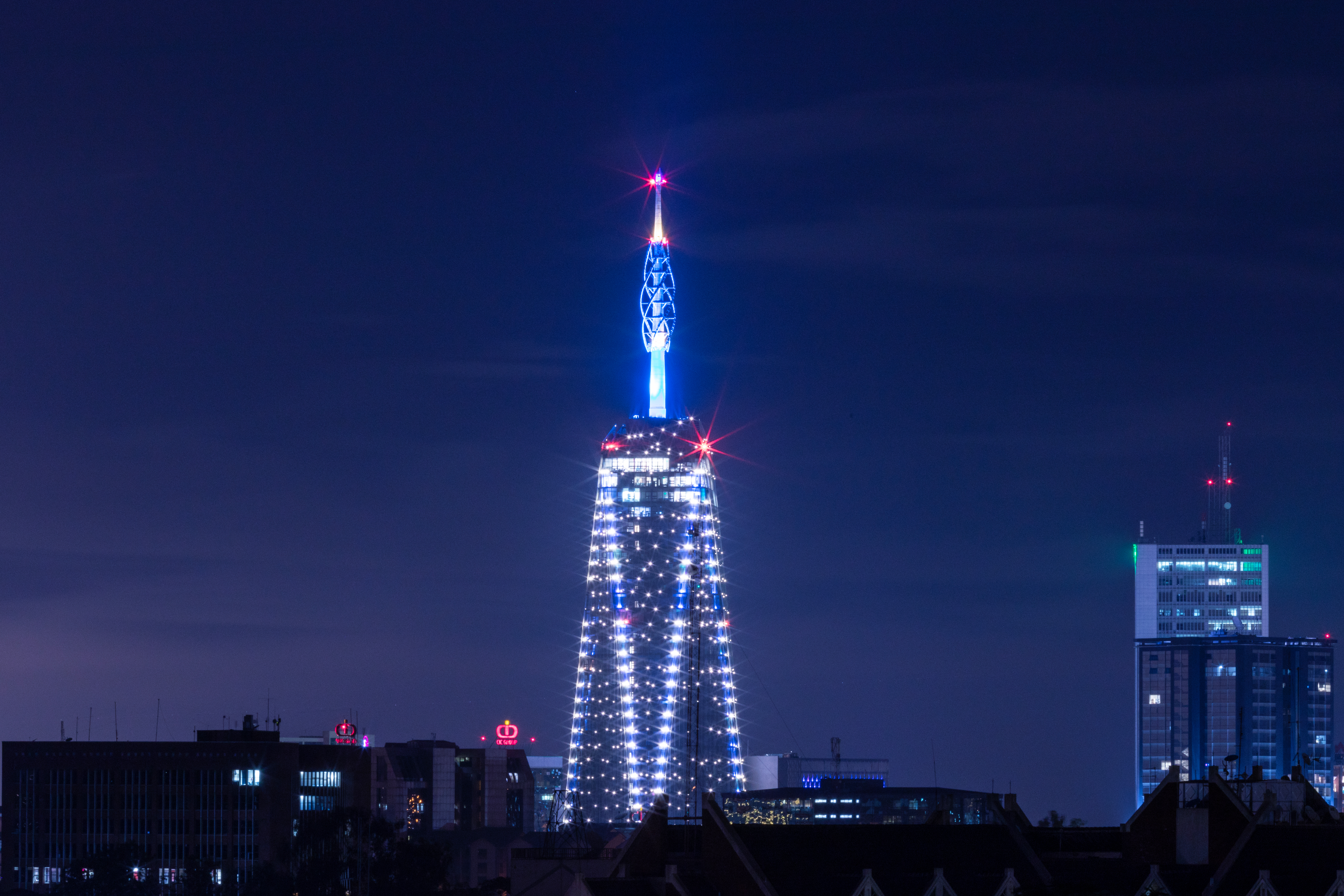
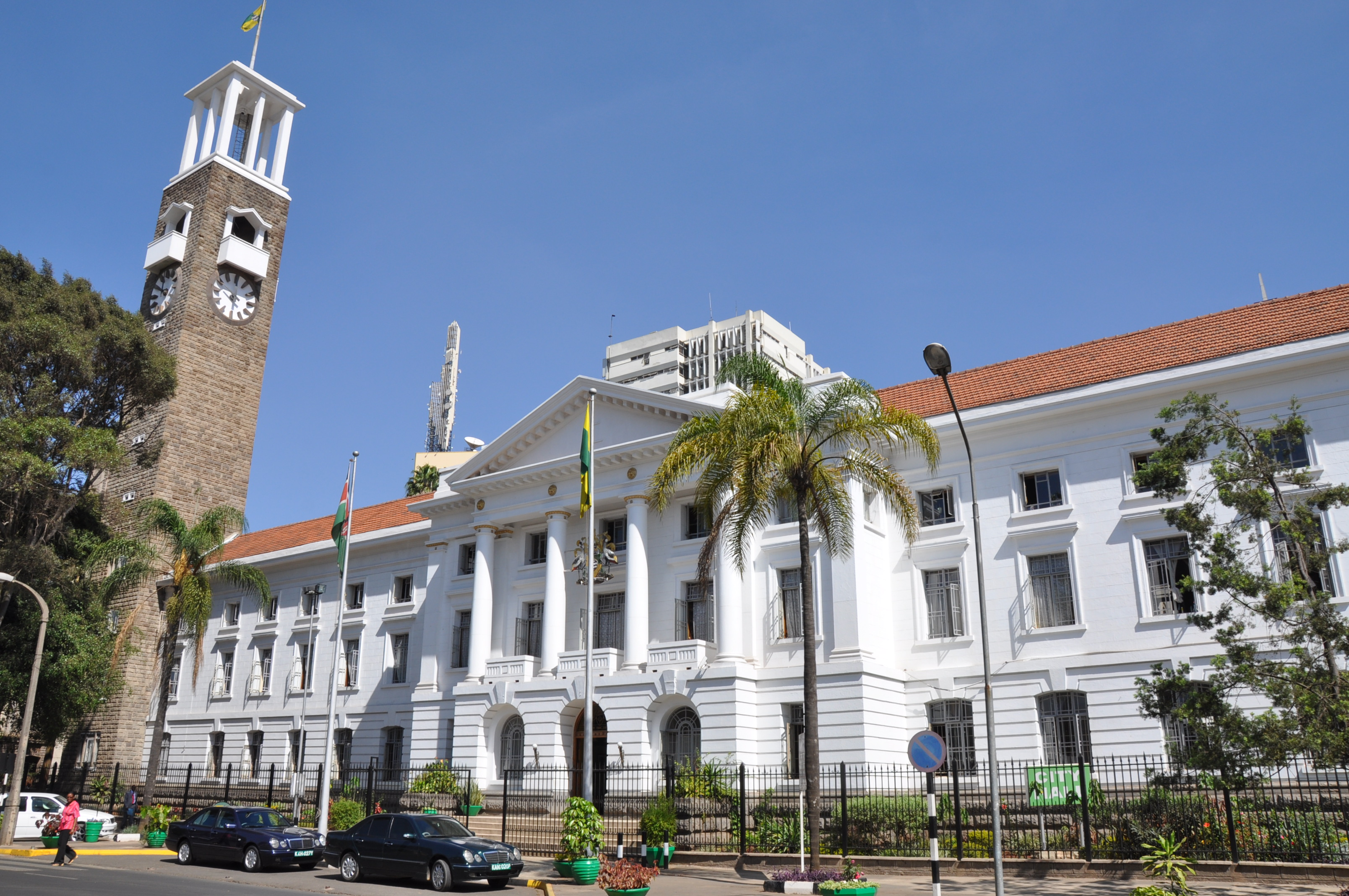
- Skyline of Nairobi and the Karura Forest KICC Nairobi Expressway National Museums of Kenya Dedan Kimathi Statue Uhuru Park Karen Blixen Museum Britam Tower Nairobi City Hall

- Flag Coat of arms
- Nickname: "The Green City under the Sun"
- Interactive map of Nairobi
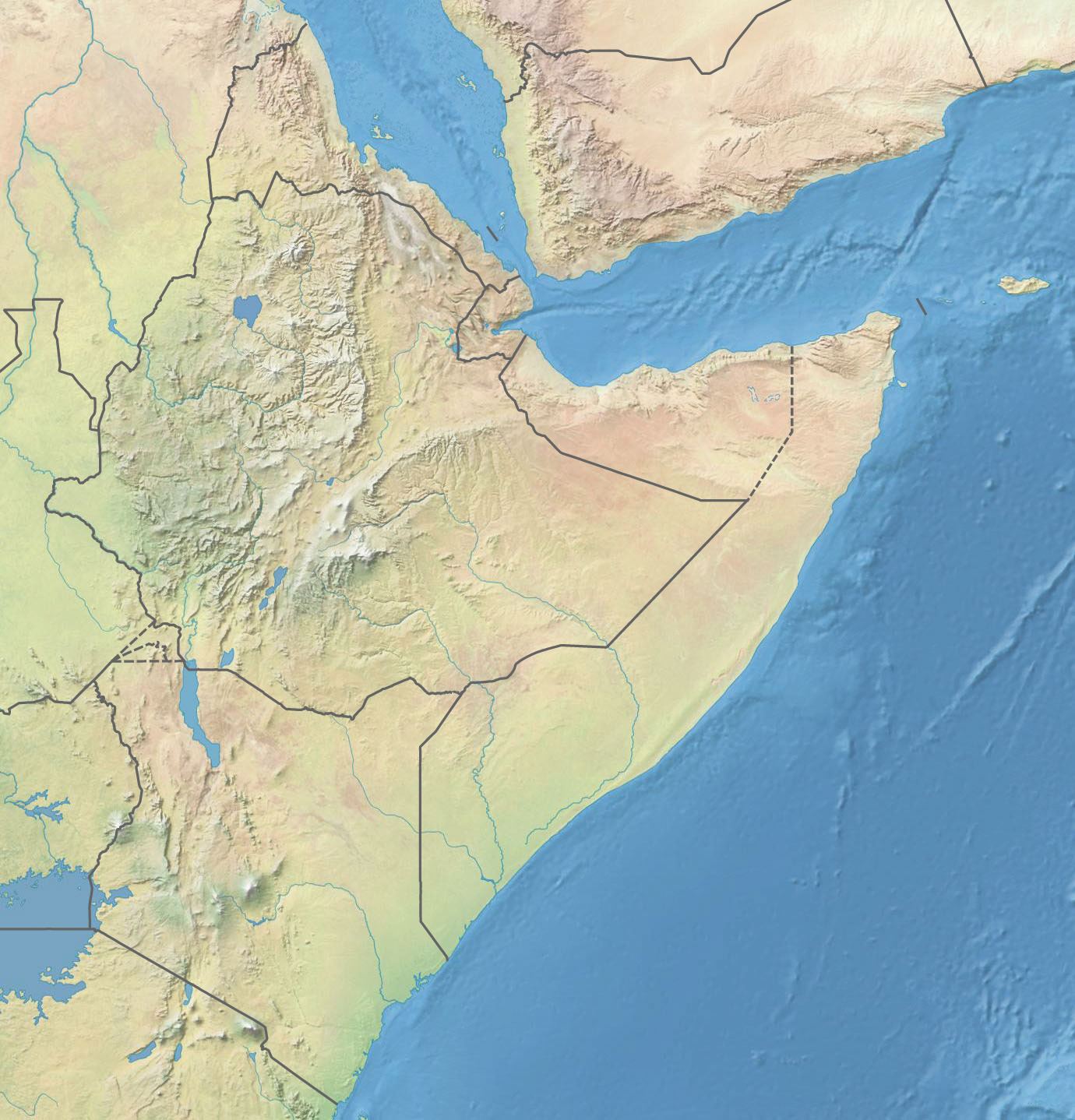
- Location within Kenya Nairobi (Horn of Africa) Nairobi (Africa)
- Coordinates: 01°17′11″S 36°49′02″E
- Country: Kenya
- County: Nairobi City
- Founded: 1899; 127 years ago
- Sub-counties: List: Dagoretti; Embakasi; Lang'ata; Kamukunji; Kasarani; Kibra; Makadara; Mathare; Njiru; Starehe; Westlands

Government
  - Body: Nairobi City County
  - Legislature: County Assembly
  - Governor: Johnson Sakaja

Area (Note: Some sources indicate Nairobi has an area of 703.9 km^{2} (271.8 sq mi))
  - Consolidated city-county: 696.1 km^{2} (268.8 sq mi)
- Elevation: 1,795 m (5,889 ft)

Population (2019)
  - Consolidated city-county: 4,397,073
  - Estimate (2026): 5,603,502
  - Rank: 1st
  - Density: 6,317/km^{2} (16,360/sq mi)
  - Urban: 6,002,000
  - Metro: 15,950,000
- Demonym: Nairobian

GDP (PPP)
  - Total: City ▲$91.0 B (1st) Metro $150B
  - Per Capita: ▲$18,958 (1st)

GDP (nominal)
  - Total: City ▲$35 billion (1st) Metro $106B
  - Per Capita: ▲$7,291 (1st)
- Time zone: UTC+03:00 (EAT)
- Area code: 020
- HDI (2022): 0.771high
- Climate: Cwb
- Website: nairobi.go.ke

Nairobi (/naɪˈroʊbi/ ny-ROH-bee) (Jiji kuu la Nairobi, in Swahili) is the capital and largest city of Kenya, located in the south-central part of the country. As of 2026, it has a population of 5.6 million and a metropolitan population of 15.95 million, making it the 8th most populous city in Africa and the 4th most populous metropolitan area. The city goes beyond its borders and has expanded into neighbouring counties, making it the 4th largest metropolitan area in Africa.

Nicknamed the "Green City under the Sun", Nairobi is uniquely notable for being the only capital city in the world that hosts a national park within its boundaries. Its name originates from the Maasai phrase Enkare Nyirobi, meaning "place of cool waters".

As the national capital, Nairobi is home to the Kenyan Parliament Buildings, the State House and the Supreme Court Building. It is the major financial and economic hub of East Africa, hosting thousands of Kenyan businesses and international companies and organisations, including the United Nations Environment Programme (UN Environment) and the United Nations Office at Nairobi (UNON). The Nairobi Securities Exchange (NSE) is one of the largest stock exchanges in Africa and the second-oldest exchange on the continent. It is Africa's fourth-largest stock exchange by trading volume, capable of processing 10 million trades a day. Nairobi is considered a global city and was ranked as a "Beta World City" by the Globalisation and World Cities Research Network as of 2024.

Nairobi was founded in 1898 by colonial authorities in British East Africa, as a rail depot on the Uganda–Kenya Railway, on the site of the current Nairobi Railway Station. The authorities favoured it as an ideal resting place due to its high elevation, temperate climate, and adequate water supply. The town expanded rapidly on the north side of the railway tracks, and grew to replace Mombasa as the capital of Kenya in 1907.

After independence in 1963, Nairobi became the capital of the Republic of Kenya. During Kenya's early period, the city became a centre for the coffee, tea and sisal industries. Successive post-independence governments have built and turned Nairobi into a modern metropolitan city with a diverse population and a growing economy.

== History ==
=== Early years ===
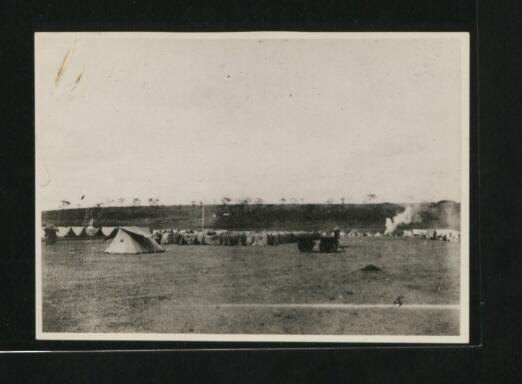
Nairobi in 1899

The site of Nairobi was originally a swamp land occupied by a pastoralist people, the Maasai, the long-distance trader community, Akamba People, as well as the agriculturalist Kikuyu people. The name Nairobi comes from the Maasai expression meaning 'cool waters'. referring to the cold water stream which flowed through the area. With the arrival of the Uganda Railway, the site was identified by Sir George Whitehouse for a store depot, shunting ground and camping ground for the Indian labourers working on the railway.

Whitehouse, chief engineer of the railway, favoured the site as an ideal resting place due to its high elevation, temperate climate, adequate water supply and being situated before the steep ascent of the Limuru escarpments. His choice was criticised by officials within the Protectorate government who felt the site was too flat, poorly drained and relatively infertile.

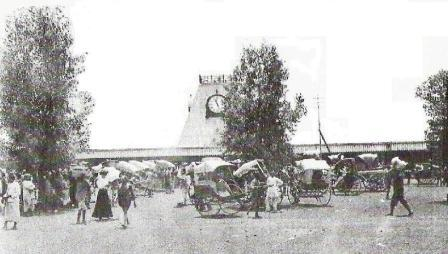
The entrance to Nairobi railway station in 1899

In the pre-colonial era, the people of modern Kenya mostly lived in villages amongst their tribes and cultural groups, where they had rulers within their communities rather than one singular government or leader.

In 1898, Arthur Church was commissioned to design the first town layout for the railway depot. It constituted two streets – Victoria Street and Station Street, ten avenues, staff quarters and an Indian commercial area. The railway arrived at Nairobi on 30 May 1899, and soon Nairobi replaced Machakos as the headquarters of the provincial administration for the Ukamba province.

On the arrival of the railway, Whitehouse remarked that "Nairobi itself will in the course of the next two years become a large and flourishing place and already there are many applications for sites for hotels, shops and houses." The town's early years were however beset with problems of malaria leading to at least one attempt to have the town moved. In the early 1900s, Bazaar Street, now Biashara Street, was completely rebuilt after an outbreak of plague and the burning of the original town.

Between 1902 and 1910, the town expanded rapidly on the north side of the railway tracks, with its population rising from 5,000 to 16,000. It initially grew around administration and tourism, in the form of big game hunting. In 1907, Nairobi replaced Mombasa as the capital of the East Africa Protectorate. In 1919, Nairobi was declared to be a municipality.

=== Growth ===
In 1921, Nairobi had 24,000 residents, of which circa 12,000 were native Africans. The next decade saw growth in native African communities in Nairobi, and they began to constitute a majority for the first time. This growth caused planning issues, described by Thorntorn White and his planning team as the "Nairobi Problem". In February 1926, colonial officer Eric Dutton passed through Nairobi on his way to Mount Kenya, and said of the city:

Maybe one day Nairobi will be laid out with tarred roads, with avenues of flowering trees, flanked by noble buildings; with open spaces and stately squares; a cathedral worthy of faith and country; museums and art; theatres and public offices. And it is fair to say that the Government and the Municipality have already bravely tackled the problem and that a town-plan ambitious enough to turn Nairobi into a thing of beauty has been slowly worked out, and much has already been done. But until that plan has borne fruit, Nairobi must remain what she was then, a slatternly creature, unfit to queen it over so lovely a country.

After World War II, continuous expansion of the city angered both the indigenous Maasai and Kikuyu. This led to the Mau Mau Uprising in the 1950s, and the Lancaster House Conferences, which initiated a transition to Kenyan independence in 1963.

In the spring of 1950, the East African Trades Union Congress (EAUTC) led a nine-day general strike in the city.

=== Post independence ===
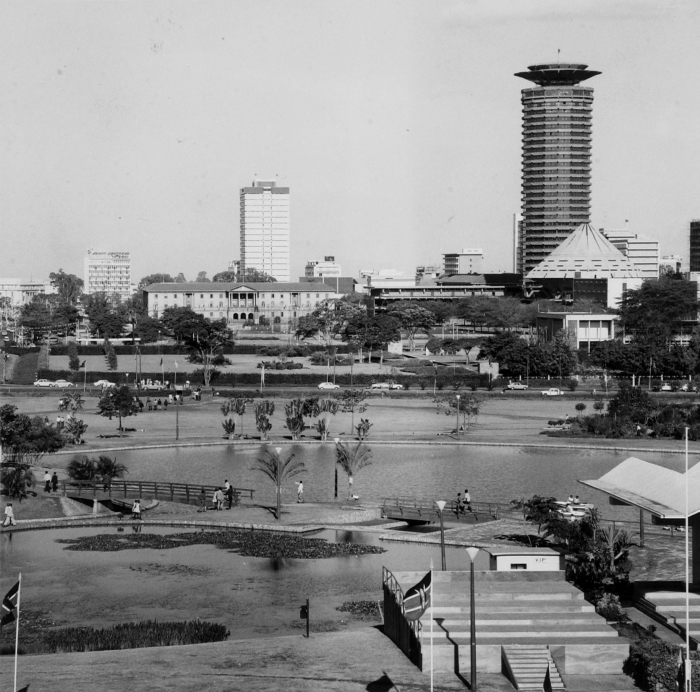
Nairobi in 1973

Nairobi remained Kenya's capital after independence, and its continued rapid growth put pressure on the city's infrastructure, with power cuts and water shortages becoming a common occurrence.

In September 1973, the Kenyatta International Conference Centre (KICC) was opened to the public. The 28-story building at the time was designed by the Norwegian architect Karl Henrik Nøstvik and Kenyan David Mutiso. It is the only building within the city with a helipad that is open to the public. Of the buildings built in the Seventies, the KICC was the most eco-friendly and most environmentally conscious structure. Its main frame was constructed with locally available materials like gravel, sand, cement and wood, and it had wide open spaces which allowed for natural aeration and lighting. Cuboids made up the plenary hall, the tower consisted of a cylinder composed of several cuboids, and the amphitheatre and helipad both resembled cones. The tower was built around a concrete core, and it had no walls but glass windows, which allowed for maximum natural lighting. It had the largest halls in eastern and central Africa.

In 1972, the World Bank approved funds for further expansion of the then Nairobi Airport (now Jomo Kenyatta International Airport), including a new international and domestic passenger terminal building, the airport's first dedicated cargo and freight terminal, new taxiways, associated aprons, internal roads, car parks, police and fire stations, a State Pavilion, airfield and roadway lighting, fire hydrant system, water, electrical, telecommunications and sewage systems, a dual carriageway passenger access road, security, drainage and the building of the main access road to the airport (Airport South Road). The cost of the project was more than US$29 million, US$111.8 million in 2013 dollars. On 14 March 1978, construction of the terminal building was completed on the other side of the airport's single runway and opened by President Jomo Kenyatta less than five months before his death. The airport was renamed Jomo Kenyatta International Airport in memory of its first president.

The United States Embassy, then located in downtown Nairobi, was bombed in August 1998 by Al-Qaeda and the Egyptian Islamic Jihad, as one of a series of US embassy bombings. It is now the site of a memorial park.

=== 21st century ===
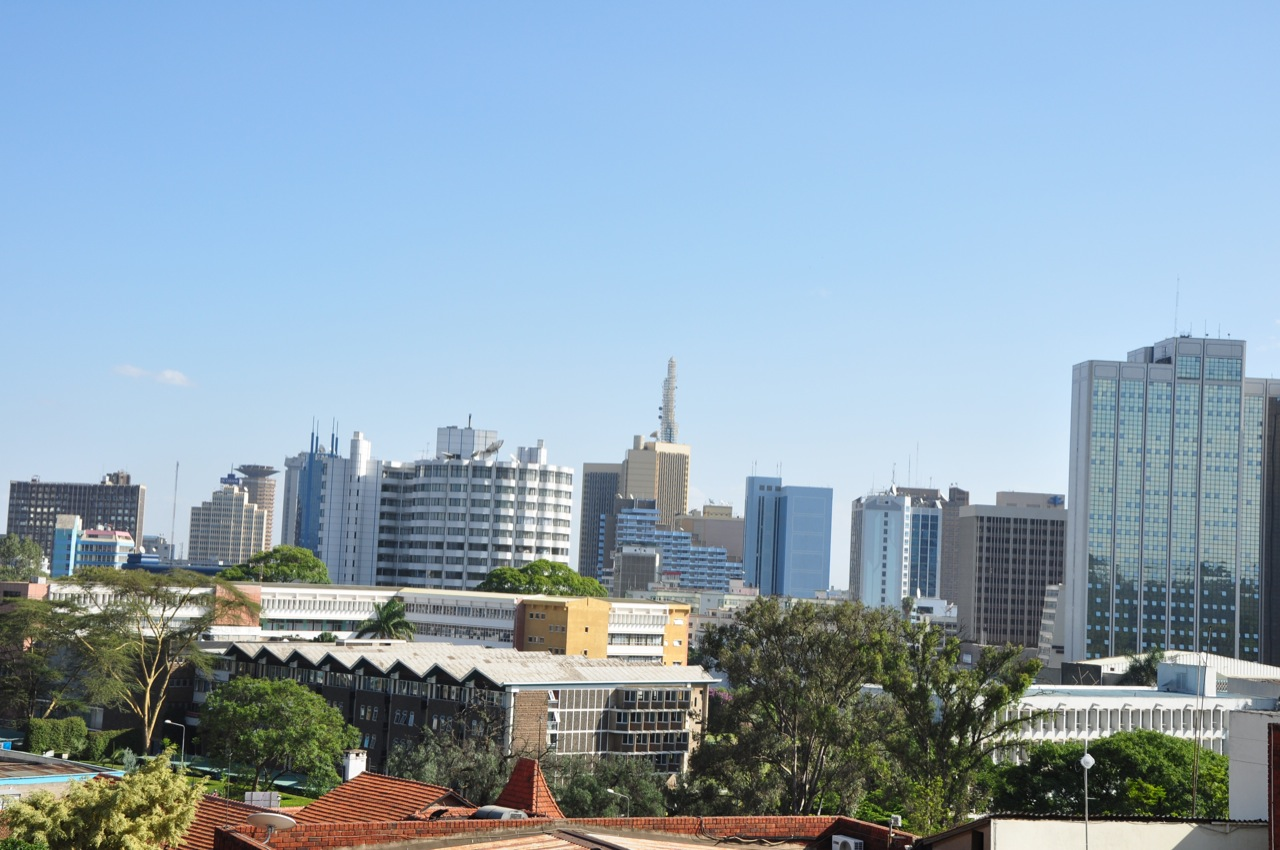
Nairobi showing Fedha Towers, ICEA Building, the Nairobi Safari Club and Anniversary Towers

In November 2012, President Mwai Kibaki opened the KES 31 billion Thika Superhighway. This mega-project in Kenya started in 2009 and ended in 2011. It involved expanding the four-lane carriageway to eight lanes, building underpasses, providing interchanges at roundabouts, erecting flyovers and building underpasses to ease congestion. The 50.4-kilometre road was built in three phases: Uhuru Highway to Muthaiga Roundabout; Muthaiga Roundabout to Kenyatta University and; Kenyatta University to Thika Town.

In May 2017, President Uhuru Kenyatta inaugurated the Standard Gauge Railway, which connects Nairobi to Mombasa. It was primarily built by a Chinese firm with about 90% of total funding from China and about 10% from the Kenyan government. A second phase is also being built, which will link Naivasha to the existing route and also the Uganda border.

Nairobi has seen several major infrastructure projects in the 2020s. The Nairobi Expressway, completed in 2022, was developed to reduce traffic congestion along Mombasa Road. In 2021, the Green Park Bus Terminal, part of efforts to improve public transport, began operations. In line with the Kenyan government's Affordable Housing Program, various housing developments are underway to accommodate the city's growing population.. As of November 2026, preparations are ongoing for the construction of Nairobi Railway City. Initially mooted in 2012, and slightly larger than the current core central business district, the project is envisioned to transform the southern side of the railway station area into a modern expansion of the CBD, and the railway station into a high-capacity multimodal interchange.

== Geography ==
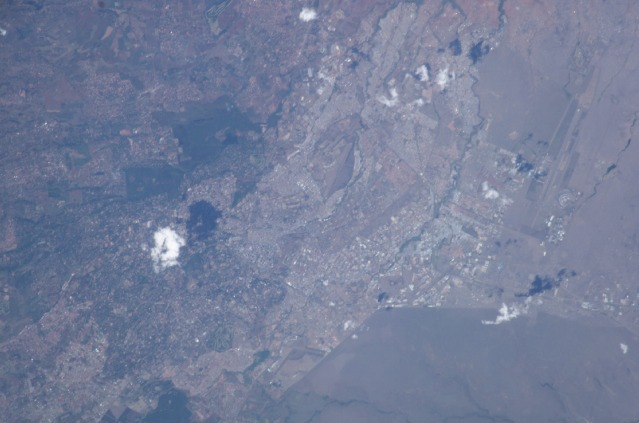
A satellite view of Nairobi, 2004

Nairobi is situated at 1°09′S 36°39′E and 1°27′S 37°06′E and occupies 696 square kilometres (270 sq mi).

Nairobi is situated between the cities of Kampala and Mombasa. As Nairobi is adjacent to the eastern edge of the Rift Valley, minor earthquakes and tremors occasionally occur. The Ngong Hills, located to the west of the city, are the most prominent geographical feature of the Nairobi area. Mount Kenya is situated north of Nairobi, and Mount Kilimanjaro is towards the south-east.

The Nairobi River and its tributaries traverse through the Nairobi County and join the larger River Athi on the eastern edge of the county.

Nobel Peace Prize laureate Wangari Maathai fought fiercely to save the indigenous Karura Forest in northern Nairobi, which was under threat of being replaced by housing and other infrastructure.

Nairobi's western suburbs stretch all the way from the Kenyatta National Hospital in the south to the UN headquarters at Gigiri suburb in the north, a distance of about 20 kilometres (12 mi). The city is centred on the City Square, which is located in the Central Business District. The Kenyan Parliament buildings, the Holy Family Cathedral, Nairobi City Hall, Nairobi Law Courts, and the Kenyatta Convention Centre all surround the square.

=== Climate ===
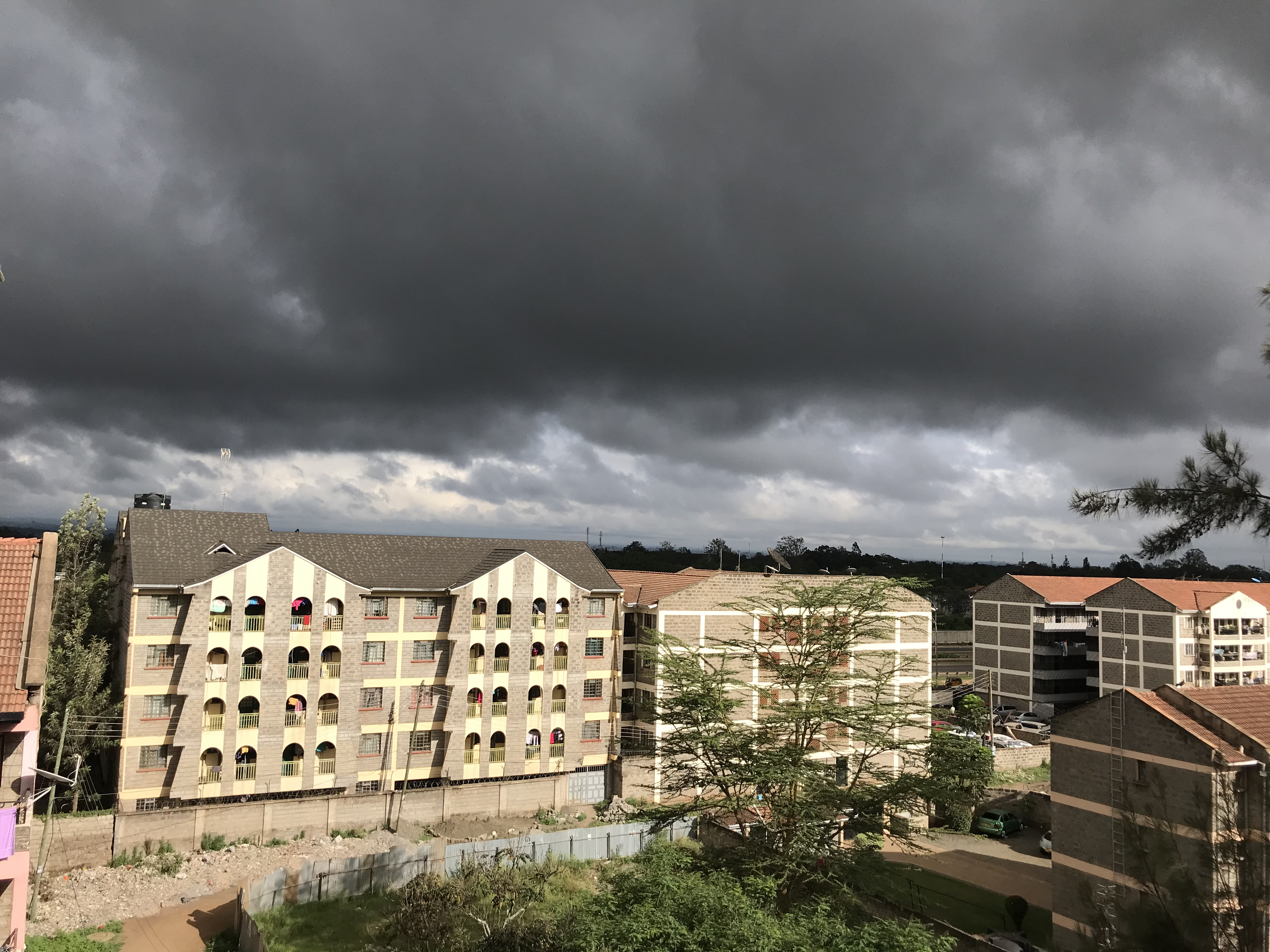
Rain clouds over estates, December 2019

Under the Köppen climate classification, Nairobi has a subtropical highland climate (Cwb). At 1,795 metres (5,889 ft) above sea level, evenings may be cool, especially in the June/July season, when the temperature can drop to 9 °C (48 °F). The sunniest and warmest part of the year is from December to March, when temperatures average in the high-twenties Celsius during the day. The mean maximum temperature for this period is 28 °C (82 °F).

There are rainy seasons, but rainfall can be moderate. The cloudiest part of the year is just after the first rainy season, when, until September, conditions are usually overcast with drizzle. As Nairobi is situated close to the equator, the differences between the seasons are minimal. The seasons are referred to as the wet season and dry season. The timing of sunrise and sunset varies little throughout the year for the same reason.

Climate data for Nairobi (Jomo Kenyatta International Airport), elevation 1,615 m (5,299 ft), (1991–2020 normals, extremes 1961–1990, 1999–present)
Month	Jan	Feb	Mar	Apr	May	Jun	Jul	Aug	Sep	Oct	Nov	Dec	Year
Record high °C (°F)	32.2 (90.0)	33.6 (92.5)	32.5 (90.5)	32.2 (90.0)	32.4 (90.3)	29.0 (84.2)	29.4 (84.9)	32.2 (90.0)	32.5 (90.5)	35.7 (96.3)	32.2 (90.0)	32.2 (90.0)	35.7 (96.3)
Mean daily maximum °C (°F)	26.9 (80.4)	27.4 (81.3)	28.0 (82.4)	26.2 (79.2)	24.9 (76.8)	23.7 (74.7)	23.6 (74.5)	24.1 (75.4)	26.3 (79.3)	26.9 (80.4)	25.3 (77.5)	25.8 (78.4)	25.8 (78.4)
Daily mean °C (°F)	20.5 (68.9)	20.8 (69.4)	21.6 (70.9)	20.8 (69.4)	19.8 (67.6)	18.5 (65.3)	17.7 (63.9)	18.2 (64.8)	19.4 (66.9)	20.6 (69.1)	19.9 (67.8)	19.7 (67.5)	19.8 (67.6)
Mean daily minimum °C (°F)	14.1 (57.4)	14.1 (57.4)	15.1 (59.2)	15.4 (59.7)	14.8 (58.6)	13.1 (55.6)	11.9 (53.4)	12.5 (54.5)	12.9 (55.2)	14.3 (57.7)	15.4 (59.7)	14.8 (58.6)	14.0 (57.3)
Record low °C (°F)	3.2 (37.8)	5.8 (42.4)	7.2 (45.0)	9.8 (49.6)	6.3 (43.3)	6.1 (43.0)	2.8 (37.0)	4.4 (39.9)	4.2 (39.6)	5.4 (41.7)	7.8 (46.0)	5.3 (41.5)	2.8 (37.0)
Average precipitation mm (inches)	57.8 (2.28)	36.2 (1.43)	74.7 (2.94)	130.2 (5.13)	108.9 (4.29)	28.8 (1.13)	10.9 (0.43)	18.5 (0.73)	16.9 (0.67)	50.0 (1.97)	130.6 (5.14)	85.4 (3.36)	748.9 (29.5)
Average precipitation days (≥ 1.0 mm)	4.4	3.5	7.1	10.7	8.9	3.6	1.8	2.2	2.3	6.4	13.8	7.3	72
Average relative humidity (%)	69	63	66	77	79	76	74	71	67	67	77	76	72
Mean monthly sunshine hours	282.1	265.6	263.5	204.0	179.8	159.0	124.0	124.0	168.0	213.9	204.0	254.2	2,442.1
Mean daily sunshine hours	9.1	9.4	8.5	6.8	5.8	5.3	4.0	4.0	5.6	6.9	6.8	8.2	6.7
Source 1: Deutscher Wetterdienst (humidity and sun 1961–1990)
Source 2: Starlings Roost Weather

Climate data for Nairobi (Dagoretti) 1961–1990, extremes 1955–1982 and 1984–present
Month	Jan	Feb	Mar	Apr	May	Jun	Jul	Aug	Sep	Oct	Nov	Dec	Year
Record high °C (°F)	34.8 (94.6)	33.5 (92.3)	32.9 (91.2)	29.0 (84.2)	26.8 (80.2)	28.1 (82.6)	32.7 (90.9)	32.5 (90.5)	30.0 (86.0)	32.0 (89.6)	37.9 (100.2)	35.6 (96.1)	37.9 (100.2)
Mean daily maximum °C (°F)	25.5 (77.9)	26.7 (80.1)	27.7 (81.9)	25.8 (78.4)	23.5 (74.3)	22.5 (72.5)	22.0 (71.6)	22.7 (72.9)	25.0 (77.0)	25.7 (78.3)	24.0 (75.2)	24.5 (76.1)	24.6 (76.4)
Daily mean °C (°F)	19.7 (67.5)	20.2 (68.4)	21.0 (69.8)	19.5 (67.1)	17.8 (64.0)	16.3 (61.3)	15.6 (60.1)	15.9 (60.6)	17.3 (63.1)	18.5 (65.3)	18.4 (65.1)	18.1 (64.6)	18.2 (64.7)
Mean daily minimum °C (°F)	12.7 (54.9)	12.7 (54.9)	13.8 (56.8)	14.0 (57.2)	12.1 (53.8)	10.0 (50.0)	9.2 (48.6)	9.1 (48.4)	9.7 (49.5)	11.3 (52.3)	12.7 (54.9)	11.7 (53.1)	11.6 (52.9)
Record low °C (°F)	3.3 (37.9)	2.2 (36.0)	6.7 (44.1)	7.8 (46.0)	7.9 (46.2)	4.4 (39.9)	1.1 (34.0)	2.9 (37.2)	3.9 (39.0)	5.5 (41.9)	6.7 (44.1)	6.2 (43.2)	1.1 (34.0)
Average precipitation mm (inches)	58.3 (2.30)	49.8 (1.96)	92.2 (3.63)	242.3 (9.54)	189.5 (7.46)	38.6 (1.52)	17.6 (0.69)	24.0 (0.94)	31.2 (1.23)	60.8 (2.39)	149.6 (5.89)	107.6 (4.24)	1,061.5 (41.79)
Average precipitation days (≥ 1.0 mm)	4	4	8	15	13	5	3	4	4	7	14	9	90
Average relative humidity (%)	60	56	62	71	73	73	73	71	64	63	71	66	67
Mean monthly sunshine hours	288.3	266.0	267.0	204.0	189.1	159.0	130.2	127.1	180.0	226.3	198.0	257.3	2,492.3
Mean daily sunshine hours	9.3	9.3	8.6	6.8	6.1	5.3	4.2	4.1	6.0	7.3	6.6	8.3	6.8
Source 1: NOAA
Source 2: Deutscher Wetterdienst (extremes from 1955 to 1982 and humidity, 1961–1990), Meteo Climat (extremes from 1984–present)

=== Nairobi metropolitan region ===
Nairobi is found within the Greater Nairobi Metropolitan region, which consists of parts of 5 out of 47 counties in Kenya, which generate about 40% of the entire nation's GDP as per 2022 data by the Kenya National Bureau of Statistics. Nairobi County on its own contributes to 27.5% of the country's GDP according to the same report while Kiambu county comes second with 5.9%.

=== Districts and neighbourhoods ===
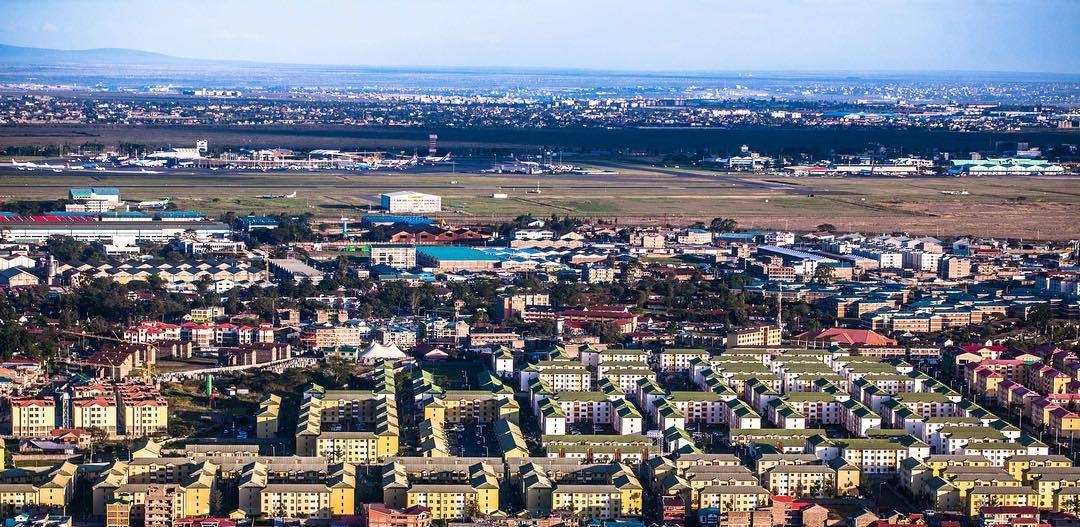
Nairobi southern suburbs,2003

Nairobi is divided into a series of constituencies, with each being represented by members of Parliament in the National Assembly. The initial constituencies before the 2010 constitution which led to the county electoral boundaries being redrawn were: Makadara, Kamukunji, Starehe, Langata, Dagoretti, Westlands, Kasarani, and Embakasi. The new electoral boundaries after this were revised to Embakasi North, Embakasi South, Embakasi Central, Embakasi East, Embakasi West, Makadara, Kamukunji, Starehe, Mathare, Westlands, Dagoretti North, Dagoretti South, Langata, Kibra, Ruaraka, Roysambu and Kasarani.

The main administrative divisions of Nairobi are Central, Dagoretti, Embakasi, Kasarani, Kibera, Makadara, Pumwani, and Westlands. Most of the upmarket suburbs are situated to the west and north-central of Nairobi, where most European settlers resided during the colonial times AKA 'Ubabini'. These include Karen, Langata, Lavington, Gigiri, Muthaiga, Brookside, Spring Valley, Loresho, Kilimani, Kileleshwa, Hurlingham, Runda, Kitisuru, Nyari, Kyuna, Lower Kabete, Westlands, and Highridge, although Kangemi, Kawangware, and Dagoretti are lower income areas close to these affluent suburbs. The city's colonial past is commemorated by many English place-names.

Most lower-middle and upper-middle income neighbourhoods are located in the north-central areas, such as Highridge, Parklands, Ngara, Pangani, and areas to the southwest and southeast of the metropolitan area near the Jomo Kenyatta International Airport. The most notable ones include Avenue Park, Fedha, Pipeline, Donholm, Greenfields, Nyayo, Taasia, Baraka, Nairobi West, Madaraka, Siwaka, South B, South C, Mugoya, Riverbank, Hazina, Buru Buru, Uhuru, Harambee Civil Servants', Akiba, Kimathi, Pioneer, and Koma Rock to the centre-east and Kasarani to the northeast area, among others.

The low and lower-income estates are located mainly in far eastern Nairobi. These include, Umoja, Kariokor, Dandora, Kariobangi, Kayole,Njiru, Chokaa, Ruai, Kamulu, Embakasi, and Huruma. Kitengela suburb, though located further southeast, Ongata Rongai and Kiserian further southwest, and Ngong/Embulbul suburbs, also known as 'Diaspora' to the far west are considered part of the Greater Nairobi Metropolitan area. More than 90% of Nairobi residents work within the Nairobi Metropolitan area, in the formal and informal sectors. Many Somali immigrants have also settled in Eastleigh, nicknamed "Little Mogadishu". A complete list of Nairobi postal codes by area and constituency is available online.

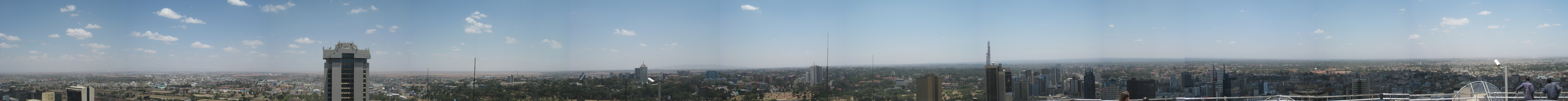
360-degree Nairobi panorama

==== Kibera slum ====
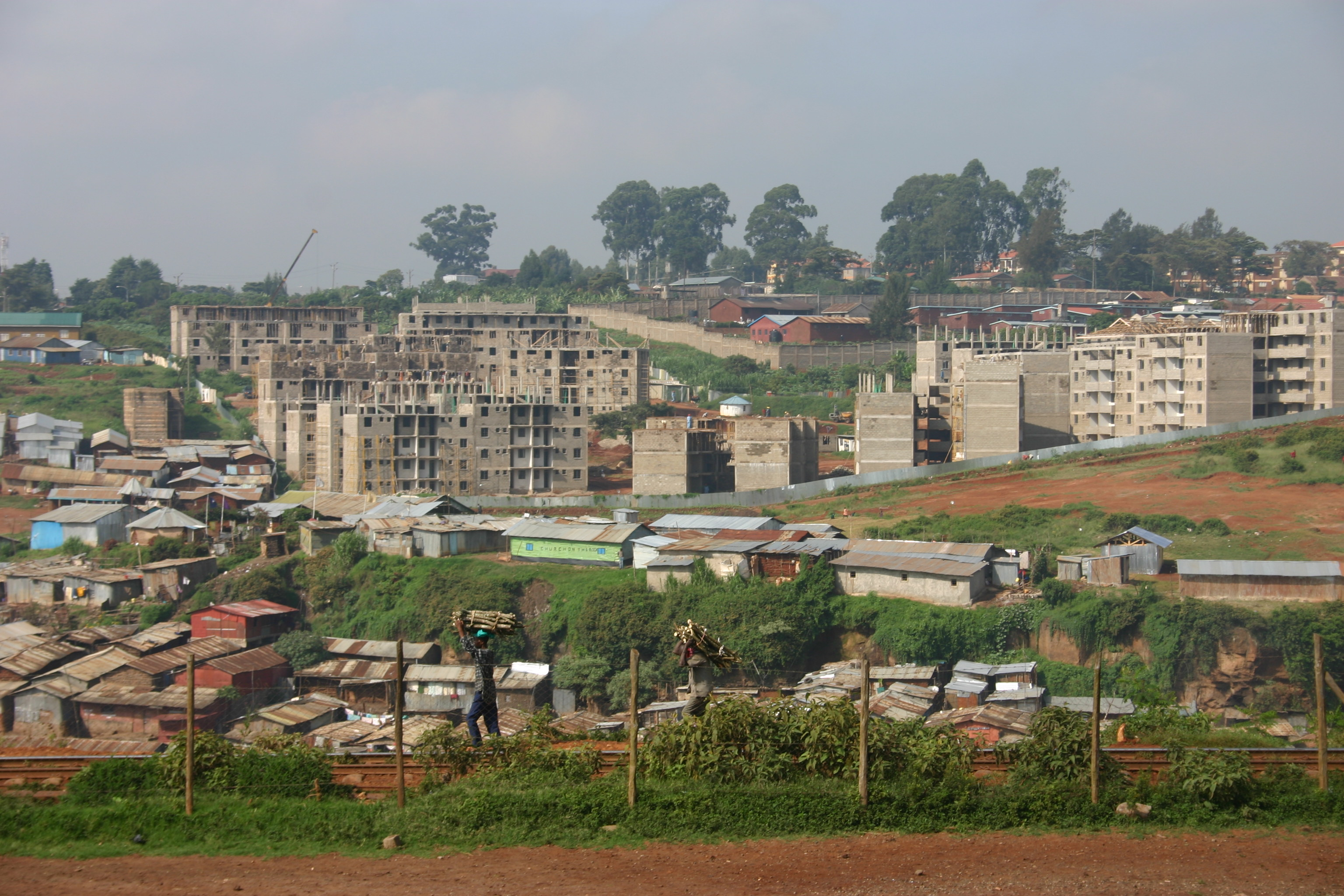
Kibera slums being upgraded to New Apartment by the Kenyan Ministry of housing and United Nations Habitat

The Kibera slum in Nairobi is claimed by the Kenyan government to have a population of 185,777. However, non-governmental sources generally estimate the slum to have a population of 500,000 to 1,000,000, depending on what areas are defined as comprising Kibera.

== Parks and gardens ==
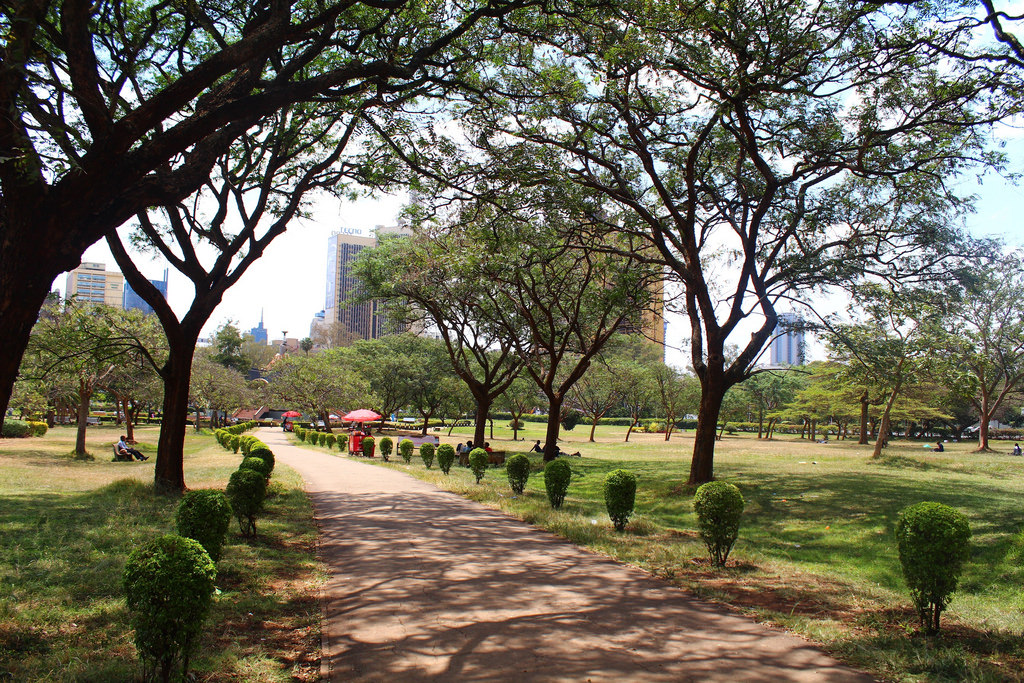
Central Park

Nairobi has many parks and open spaces throughout the city. Much of the city has dense tree-cover and plenty of green spaces.

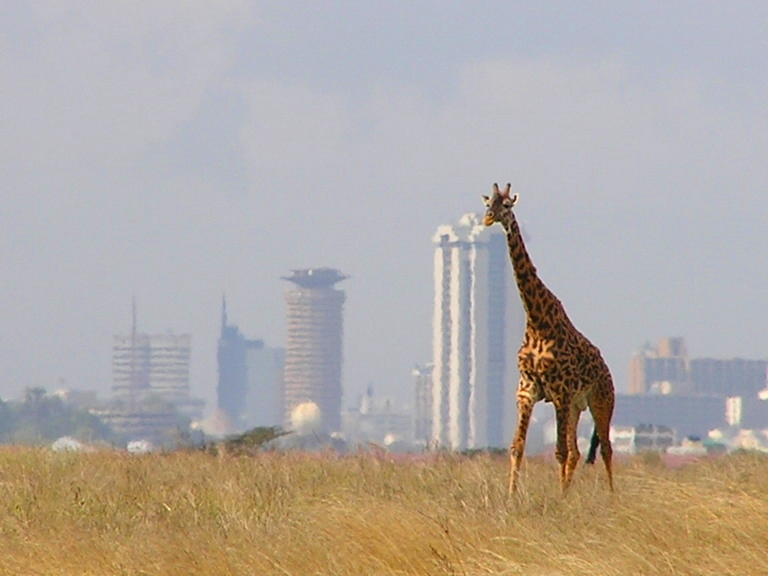
A giraffe at Nairobi National Park, with Nairobi's skyline in background

The most famous park in Nairobi is Uhuru Park. The park borders the central business district and the neighbourhood Upper Hill. Uhuru (Freedom in Swahili) Park is a centre for outdoor speeches, services, and rallies. The park was to be built over by former President Daniel arap Moi, who wanted the 62-storey headquarters of his party, the Kenya African National Union, situated in the park. However, the park was saved following a campaign by Nobel Peace Prize winner Wangari Maathai.

Central Park is adjacent to Uhuru Park, and includes a memorial for Jomo Kenyatta, the first president of Kenya, and the Moi Monument, built in 1988 to commemorate the second president's first decade in power.

Both Uhuru Park and Central Park were renovated by the-then Nairobi Metropolitan Services (NMS) together with the Kenya Defence Forces. The process started in September 2023 and incorporates several key elements, including a cascading water feature, upgraded sanitation facilities, a skateboarding zone, and pedestrian-friendly paths. It also highlights statues of native wildlife, carefully groomed lawns, thriving trees, improved footpaths, and expanded green zones. A botanical section has been established as well, showcasing a diverse collection of flowers and plant species to reflect Kenya's abundant floral heritage.

Jeevanjee Gardens is located within the Central Business District and is easily accessible via foot, private vehicles and public transport. Among Nairobi's most historic and oldest public green spaces, the park was created in the early 20th century by Asian industrialist A.M. Jeevanjee.

The John Michuki Memorial Park is situated along the Nairobi River, stretching from Globe Cinema Roundabout to Museum Bridge. It was previously known as the Mazingira Park, and was reopened in August 2020 by President Uhuru Kenyatta after renovation by the Kenya Forest Service, Kenya Forestry Research Institute (KEFRI), and National Environment Management Authority (NEMA). The park is named in tribute to the late former Cabinet Minister John Michuki, who was instrumental in the restoration of the Nairobi River and its surroundings during his time as Minister for Environment.

Nairobi Arboretum, founded in 1907 by E. Batiscombe as a trial site for forestry tree species, is a 30-hectare botanical reserve that hosts more than 350 types of trees and functions as both a leisure destination and a research hub. It is located near the State House.

Karura Forest, the city-based nature reserve, features nature trails, picnic spots, caves and waterfalls. It is an excellent destination for birdwatching as the area is home to over 200 documented bird species. While strolling along the trails, visitors may also catch glimpses of monkeys and bushbucks.

Nairobi City Park, is located between Forest Road and Limuru Road. As one of Nairobi's oldest and most expansive urban green spaces, spanning over 60 hectares, City Park holds considerable ecological value. It preserves one of the last remaining patches of indigenous forest that once blanketed the region. The park is home to a rich array of biodiversity, including Sykes' monkeys, various bird species, and a wide assortment of native plant life. City Park also carries historical weight, because it hosts cemeteries for veterans of World War I and II and is the final resting place of notable figures such as freedom fighter Pio Gama Pinto and former Vice President Joseph Murumbi, whose memorial garden is located within the park grounds.

Oloolua Nature Trail is situated in Oloolua Forest in the Karen area of Nairobi. It is under the management of Kenya Institute of Primate Research (KIPRE) and provides opportunities for nature walks, bird watching, and enjoying the natural environment. Key attractions include a 37-meter deep natural cave that was historically used by Mau Mau fighters, a beautiful waterfall draining into the Mbagathi River, a bamboo resting point, and a papyrus swamp.

Ngong Road Forest Sanctuary contains winding walking and jogging paths that pass through tall trees inhabited by various bird species, with occasional sightings of Sykes monkeys. The area also includes a picnic site and a playground for children. Additionally, Ngong Road Forest has cycling trails that run beneath the indigenous tree canopy.

Langata Botanical Gardens is a private recreational garden located along Langata South Road. The area comprises numerous native trees, expansive well-maintained lawns, and a lagoon inhabited by a diverse range of fish species.

Other private botanical gardens include Maarifa Park Botanical Garden, located in Kitisuru and the Five Senses Botanical Gardens by Enaki, located in Nyari, Nairobi.

Nairobi Botanical Gardens is located within the National Museum of Kenya. The Nairobi Botanical Gardens are organized into themed sections, each highlighting a particular conservation topic. For example, the Children's Garden focuses on botany and habitat, providing a space where visitors can learn about indigenous and exotic plants while enjoying open lawns and an outdoor amphitheatre. Other sections include the Grass Gardens, which showcase important food and beverage plants, the Herbal Garden dedicated to medicinal and food plants, the Succulent Gardens illustrating plant adaptations to arid environments, the Quarry Garden transformed from a former quarry, and the Memorial Garden commemorating World War II with symbolic plants and a water feature.

The August 7th Memorial Park is located at the site of the 1998 US Embassy bombing and features a green space that offers tranquility.

=== Threats to public spaces ===
The colonial 1948 Master Plan for Nairobi still acts as the governing mechanism when it comes to making decisions related to urban planning. The Master Plan at the time, which was designed for 250,000 people, allocated 28% of Nairobi's land to public space, but because of rapid population growth, much of the vitality of public spaces within the city are increasingly threatened. City Park, the only natural park in Nairobi, for example, was originally 60 ha (150 acres), but has since lost approximately 20 ha (50 acres) of land to private development through squatting and illegal alienation which began in the 1980s.

== Political divisions ==
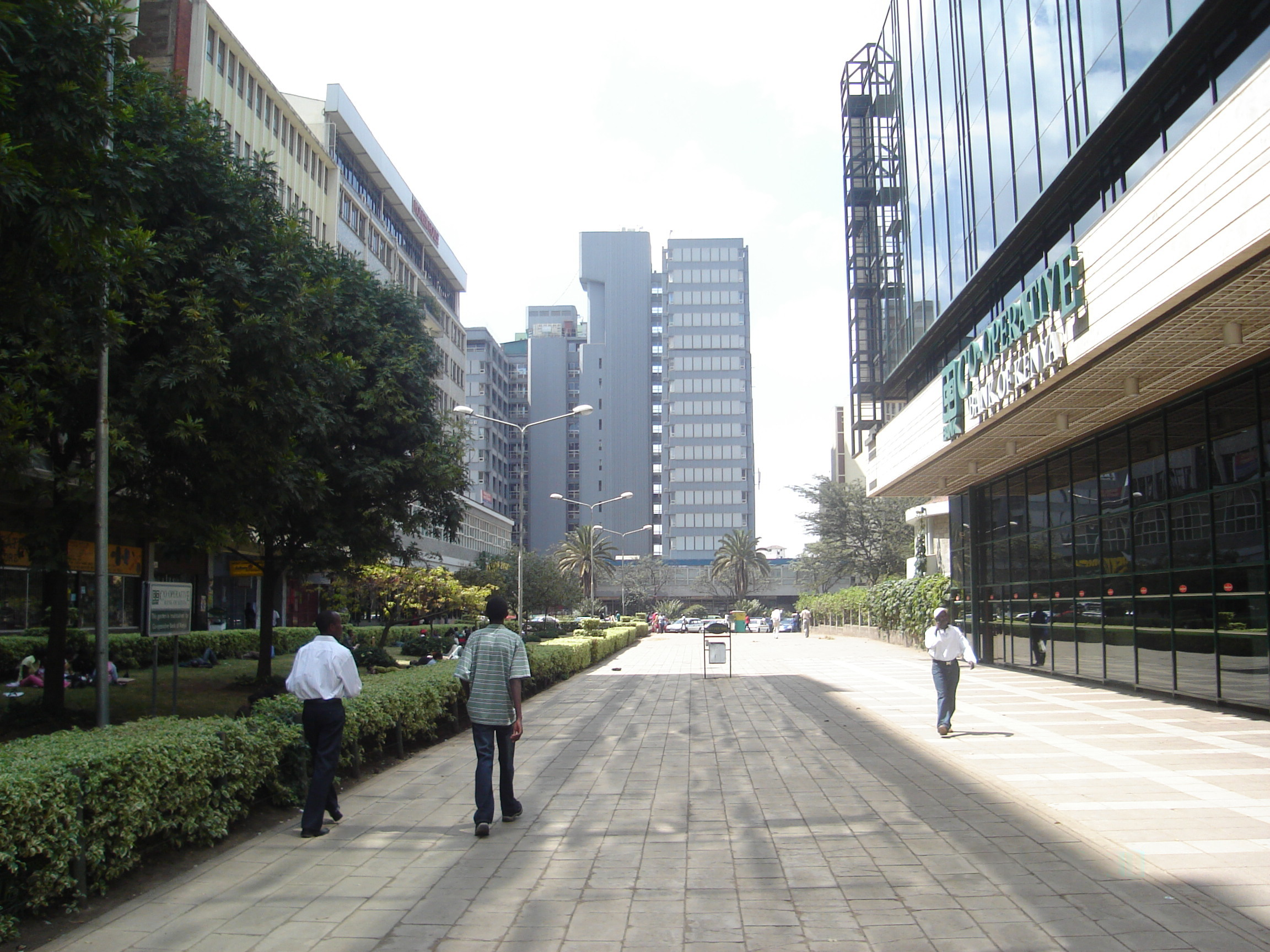
Co-operative Bank of Kenya headquarters.

Greater Nairobi Metropolitan Region, consisting of Nairobi City County (red), Kajiado County (orange), Machakos County (green), and Kiambu County (blue)

The City of Nairobi has the status of a full administrative county.

Initially, Nairobi was one of the eight provinces in Kenya before 2013. The Nairobi province differed in several ways from other Kenyan regions. Nairobi Province was not divided into "districts" until 2007, when three districts were created. In 2010, along with the new constitution, Nairobi was renamed a county and consolidated into a city-county. The county is entirely urban. It had only one local council, Nairobi City Council, which was replaced by Nairobi City County after the new constitution was effected in March 2013.

Nairobi County has 17 constituencies. Constituency name may differ from division name, such that Starehe Constituency is equal to Central Division, Lang'ata Constituency to Kibera division, and Kamukunji Constituency to Pumwani Division in terms of boundaries.

=== Constituencies ===
Nairobi is divided into 17 constituencies and 85 wards, mostly named after residential estates. Kibera Division, for example, includes Kibera, Kenya's largest slum, and the affluent estates of Karen and Langata.

Constituency	Communities
Dagoretti North	Kilimani · Kawangware · Gatina · Kileleshwa · Kabiro
Dagoretti South	Mutu-ini · Ng'ando · Riruta · Uthiru/Ruthimitu · Waithaka
Lang'ata	Karen · Nairobi West · Mugumo-ini · South C · Nyayo Highrise · Otiende
Kibra	Laini Saba · Lindi · Makina · Woodley/Kenyatta Golf Course · Sarang'ombe
Kasarani	Clay City · Mwiki · Kasarani · Njiru · Ruai · Kamulu
Roysambu	Roysambu · Garden Estate · Ridgeways · Githurai · Kahawa West · Zimmermann · Kahawa
Ruaraka	Babadogo · Utalii · Mathare North · Lucky Summer · Korogocho
Embakasi Central	Kayole North · Kayole North Central · Kayole South · Komarock · Matopeni/Spring Valley
Embakasi East	Upper Savanna · Lower Savanna · Embakasi · Utawala · Mihang'o
Embakasi North	Kariobangi North · Dandora Area I · Dandora Area II · Dandora Area III · Dandora Area IV
Embakasi South	Imara Daima · Kwa Njenga · Kwa Reuben · Pipeline · Kware
Embakasi West	Umoja I · Umoja II · Mowlem · Kariobangi South
Kamukunji	Pumwani · Eastleigh North · Eastleigh South · Airbase · California
Makadara	Maringo/Hamza · Viwandani · Harambee · Makongeni · Mbotela · Bahati
Mathare	Hospital · Mabatini · Huruma · Ngei · Mlango Kubwa · Kiamaiko
Starehe	Nairobi Central · Ngara · Pangani · Ziwani/Kariokor · Landimawe · Nairobi South
Westlands	Kitisuru · Parklands/Highridge · Karura · Kangemi · Mountain View

The Nairobi GPO (General Post Office) Postal code is 00100.

== Economy ==
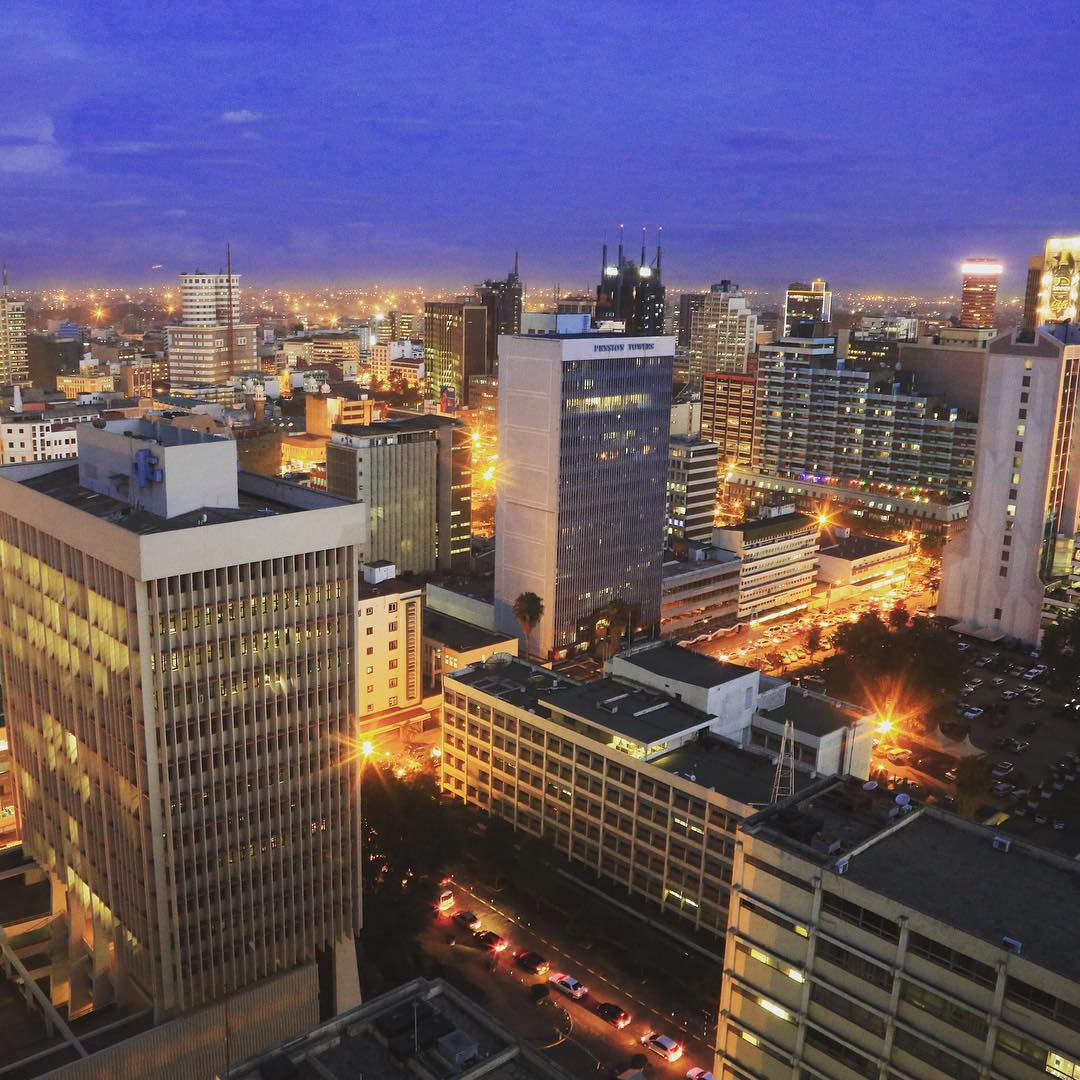
Nairobi is a major financial capital of Africa, and one of the most modern cities in Africa.

Nairobi is home to the Nairobi Securities Exchange (NSE), one of Africa's largest stock exchanges. The NSE was officially recognised as an overseas stock exchange by the London Stock Exchange in 1953. The exchange is Africa's fourth largest in terms of trading volumes, and fifth largest in terms of Market Capitalization as a percentage of GDP.

Nairobi is the regional headquarters of several international companies and organisations. In 2007, General Electric, Young & Rubicam, Google, Coca-Cola, IBM Services, and Cisco Systems relocated their African headquarters to the city. The United Nations Office at Nairobi hosts UN Environment and UN-Habitat headquarters.

Several of Africa's largest companies are headquartered in Nairobi. Safaricom, the largest company in Kenya by assets and profitability is headquartered in Nairobi, KenGen, which is the largest African stock outside South Africa, is based in the city. Kenya Airways, Africa's fourth largest airline, uses Nairobi's Jomo Kenyatta International Airport as a hub.

Nairobi has not been left behind by the FinTech phenomenon that has taken over worldwide. It has produced a couple of tech firms like Craft Silicon, Kangai Technologies, Jambo Pay and Hostraha Limited. which have been in the forefront of technology, innovation and cloud based computing services. Their products are widely used and have considerable market share presence within Kenya and outside its borders.

Goods manufactured in Nairobi include clothing, textiles, building materials, processed foods, beverages, and cigarettes. Several foreign companies have factories based in and around the city. These include Goodyear Tire and Rubber Company, General Motors, Toyota, and The Coca-Cola Company.

Nairobi has a large tourist industry, being both a tourist destination and a transport hub.

=== Central Business District (CBD) ===
Nairobi has grown around its central business district, usually referred to colloquially as "the CBD". This takes a pentagonal shape, around the Uhuru Highway, Haile Selassie Avenue, Moi Avenue, and University Way. It features many of Nairobi's important buildings, including the City Hall and Parliament Building. The city square is also located within the perimeter.

Most of the skyscrapers in this region are the headquarters of businesses and corporations, such as I&M and the Kenyatta International Conference Centre. The United States Embassy bombing took place in this district, prompting the building of a new embassy building in the suburbs.

A large beautification project took place in the Central Business District, as the city prepared to host the 2006 Afri-Cities summit. Iconic buildings such as the Kenyatta International Conference Centre had their exteriors cleaned and repainted.

Nairobi downtown area or central business district is bordered to the southwest by Uhuru Park and Central Park. The Mombasa to Kampala railway runs to the southeast of the district.

=== Upper Hill ===
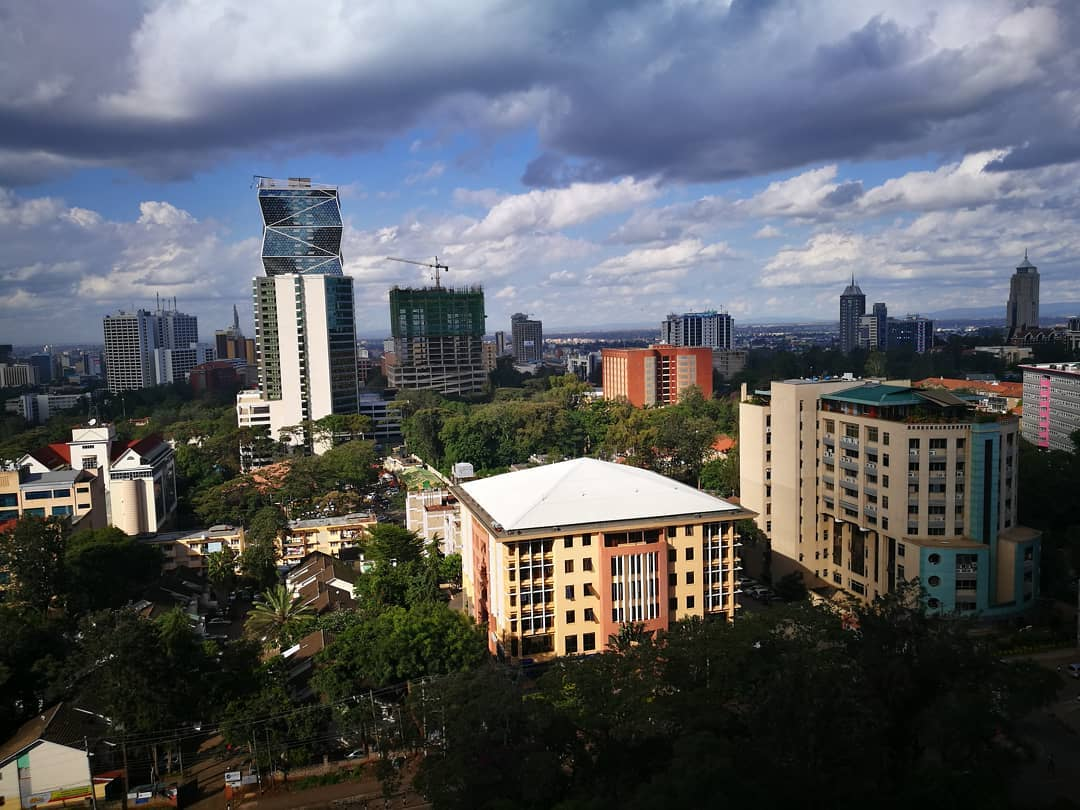
Prism Tower in Upper Hill

Two areas outside the Central Business District that are seeing growth in companies and office space are Upper Hill, which is located, approximately 4 km (2.5 mi) from the Central Business District and Westlands, about the same distance from the city centre.

Companies that have moved from the Central Business District to Upper Hill include Citibank, and in 2007 Coca-Cola began construction of their East and Central African headquarters in Upper Hill, cementing the district as the preferred location for office space in Nairobi. The largest office development in this area is UAP Tower, completed in 2015 and opened for business in July 2016. It is a 33-storey tower 163 meters high. The World Bank and International Finance Corporation, part of the World Bank Group, are also located in Upper Hill at the Delta Center, Menegai Road. Earlier on, they were located in the Hill Park Building and CBA Building respectively, both in Upper Hill, and prior to that in View Park towers in the Central Business District.

To accommodate the large demand for floor space in Nairobi, various commercial projects are being constructed. New business parks are being built in the city, including the flagship Nairobi Business Park.

=== Construction boom and real estate development projects ===
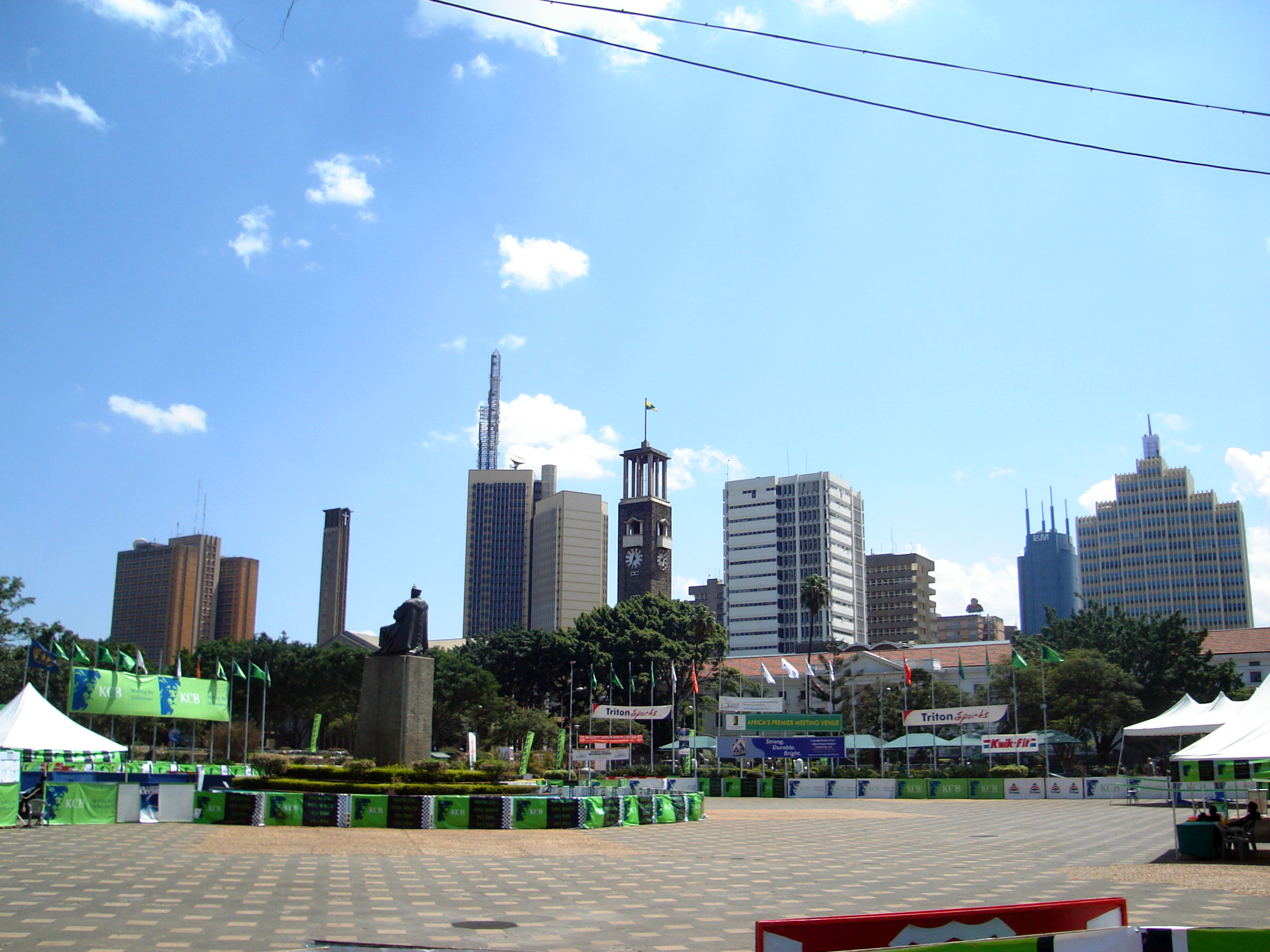
A view of Nairobi from the Kenyatta International Conference Centre

Nairobi is undergoing a construction boom. Major real estate projects and skyscrapers are coming up in the city. Among them are the pinnacle twin towers which will tower at 314 m, Britam Tower (200 m), Avic International Africa headquarters (176 m), Prism tower (140 m), Pan Africa insurance towers, Pallazzo offices, and many other projects. Shopping malls are also being constructed like the recently completed Garden city Mall, Centum's Two rivers Mall, The Hub in Karen, Karen waterfront, Thika Greens, and the recently reconstructed Westgate Mall.

High-class residential apartments for living are coming up like Le Mac towers, a residential tower in Westlands Nairobi with 23 floors. Avic International is also putting up a total of four residential apartments on Waiyaki way: a 28-level tower, two 24-level towers, and a 25-level tower. Hotel towers are also being erected in the city.

Avic International is putting up a 30-level hotel tower of 141 m in the Westlands. The hotel tower will be operated by Marriot group. Jabavu limited is constructing a 35 floor hotel tower in Upper Hill which will be high over 140 metres in the city skyline. Arcon Group Africa has also announced plans to erect a skyscraper in Upper hill which will have 66 floors and tower over 290 metres, further cementing Upper hill as the preferred metropolis for multinational corporations launching their operations in the Kenyan capital.

Nairobi's tallest skyscrapers
Pinnacle Towers (estimated completion in 2029)	314 m (1,030 ft)
Britam Tower	200 m (660 ft)
UAP Tower	163 m (535 ft)
Times Tower	140 m (460 ft)
Teleposta Towers	120 m (390 ft)
Kenyatta International Conference Centre	105 m (344 ft)
NSSF Building	103 m (338 ft)
I&M Bank Tower	100 m (330 ft)
Nyayo House	84 m (276 ft)
Cooperative Bank House	83 m (272 ft)
National Bank House	82 m (269 ft)
Hazina Towers	81 m (266 ft)
Rahimtulla Tower	80 m (260 ft)

Also see List of tallest buildings in Kenya

== Demographics ==
Historical population
Year	Pop.	±%
1969	509,286	—
1979	827,775	+62.5%
1989	1,324,570	+60.0%
1999	2,143,254	+61.8%
2009	3,138,369	+46.4%
2019	4,397,073	+40.1%
2026	4,978,028	+13.2%

As of 2026, Nairobi City has an estimated population of 4,978,028, making it Kenya's most populous city, while its metropolitan area has an estimated population of 15.95 million. Its population grew from 509,286 in 1969 to 4,397,073 in 2019 an 8.63-fold increase. In 2019, it accounted for 9.24% of Kenya's population and 29.64% of its urban population. With 1,506,888 households it had an average household size of 2.9 persons making Nairobi to have the smallest average household size in Kenya. Its population density stood at 6,247 people per km² making it the most densely populated county in Kenya. Nairobi has a relatively youthful demographic structure, with a median age of approximately 23 years, 68.3% of residents aged 15–64 and 47.5% aged 15–35. Its total fertility rate was 2.6 children per woman in 2022. Life expectancy at birth is 63.90 years (62.6 for males and 65.2 for females), ranking 18th among Kenya's 47 counties.

=== Language ===
Nairobi has one of Kenya's most linguistically diverse landscape with Swahili serving as the most widely spoken language and the lingua franca. English is also widely used in education, government, business and affluent suburbs. Other indigenous languages spoken include Kikuyu, Luo, Kamba, Luhya and Kisii.

=== Religion ===
Religious population distribution in Nairobi County
1. Christianity: 3,853,527 (88.9%)
2. Islam: 326,809 (7.54%)
3. Hindu: 38,141 (0.88%)
4. Traditionists: 7,029 (0.16%)
5. Other Religion: 46,401 (1.07%)
6. No religion / Atheists: 54,841 (1.26%)
7. No Stated: 10,333 (0.24%)

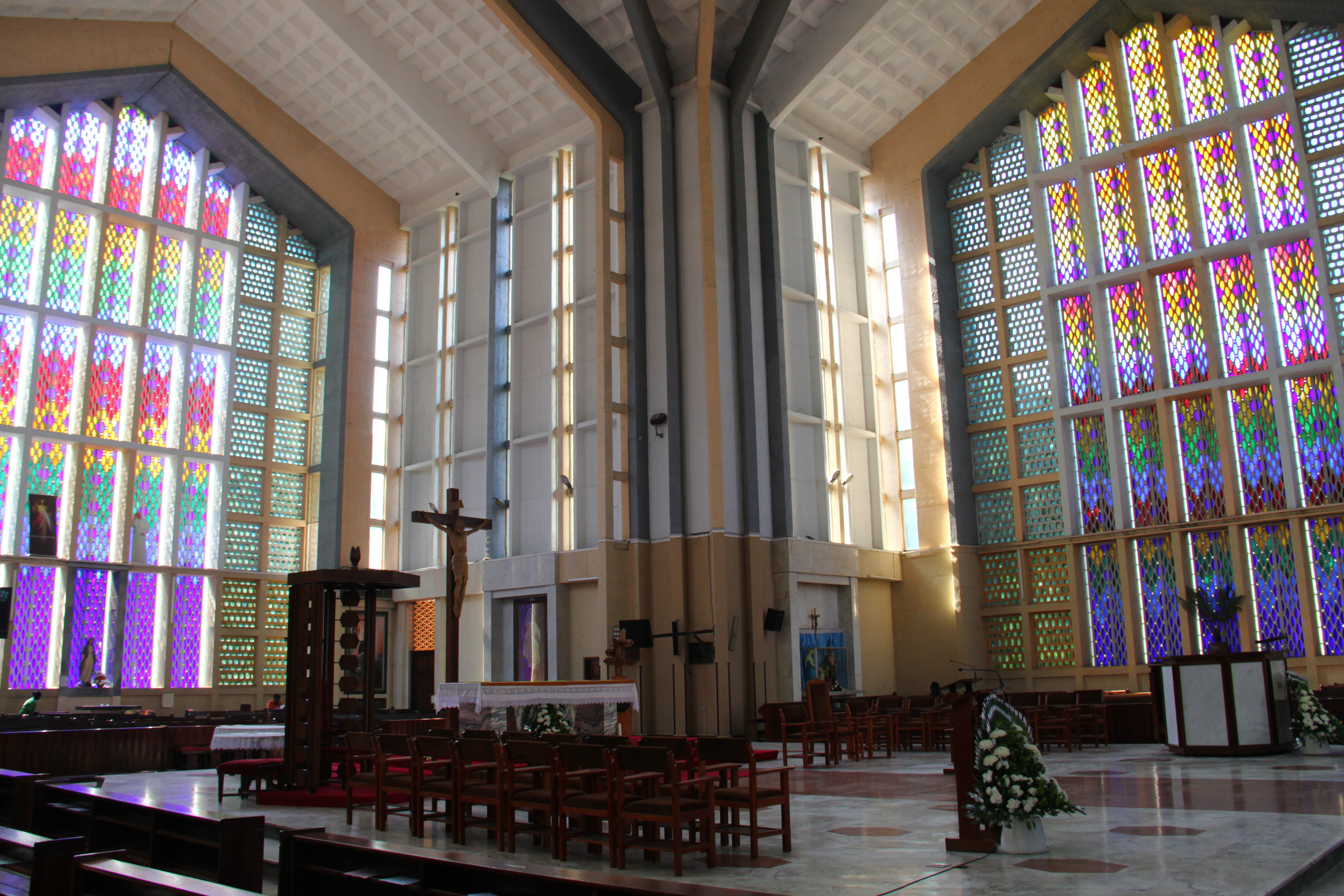
Holy Family basilica in Nairobi, Kenya

According to the 2019 Kenya Population and Housing Census, Christianity is the predominant religion in Nairobi City, accounting for approximately 87.64% of the population. Protestants form the largest religious group, with 1,358,985 adherents (30.91%), followed by Catholics at 1,041,619 (23.69%) and Evangelical Christians at 897,741 (20.42%). Other Christian denominations include African Instituted Churches (307,019), Orthodox Christians (23,160) and other Christian groups (225,003). Islam is the second-largest religion, comprising 326,809 adherents (7.43%), followed by Hinduism with 38,141 (0.87%). Additionally, 54,841 people (1.25%) identified as atheists or having no religious affiliation, while 7,029 practised traditional African religions. Smaller communities belonging to other religious groups are also present in the county.

== Culture ==
Nairobi is diverse in African cultures. As a cosmopolitan African city, it hosts all the diverse tribes that make up Kenya, and hosts a large immigrant population from other African countries.

Nairobi has two informal nicknames. The first is "The Green City in the Sun", which is derived from the city's foliage and warm climate. The second is the "Safari Capital of the World", which is used due to Nairobi's prominence as a hub for safari tourism.

In 2026, Nairobi made it to the final for the "World Capital of Kindness" competition, beaten only by San Donato Milanese, Italy (first place).

=== Literature and film ===
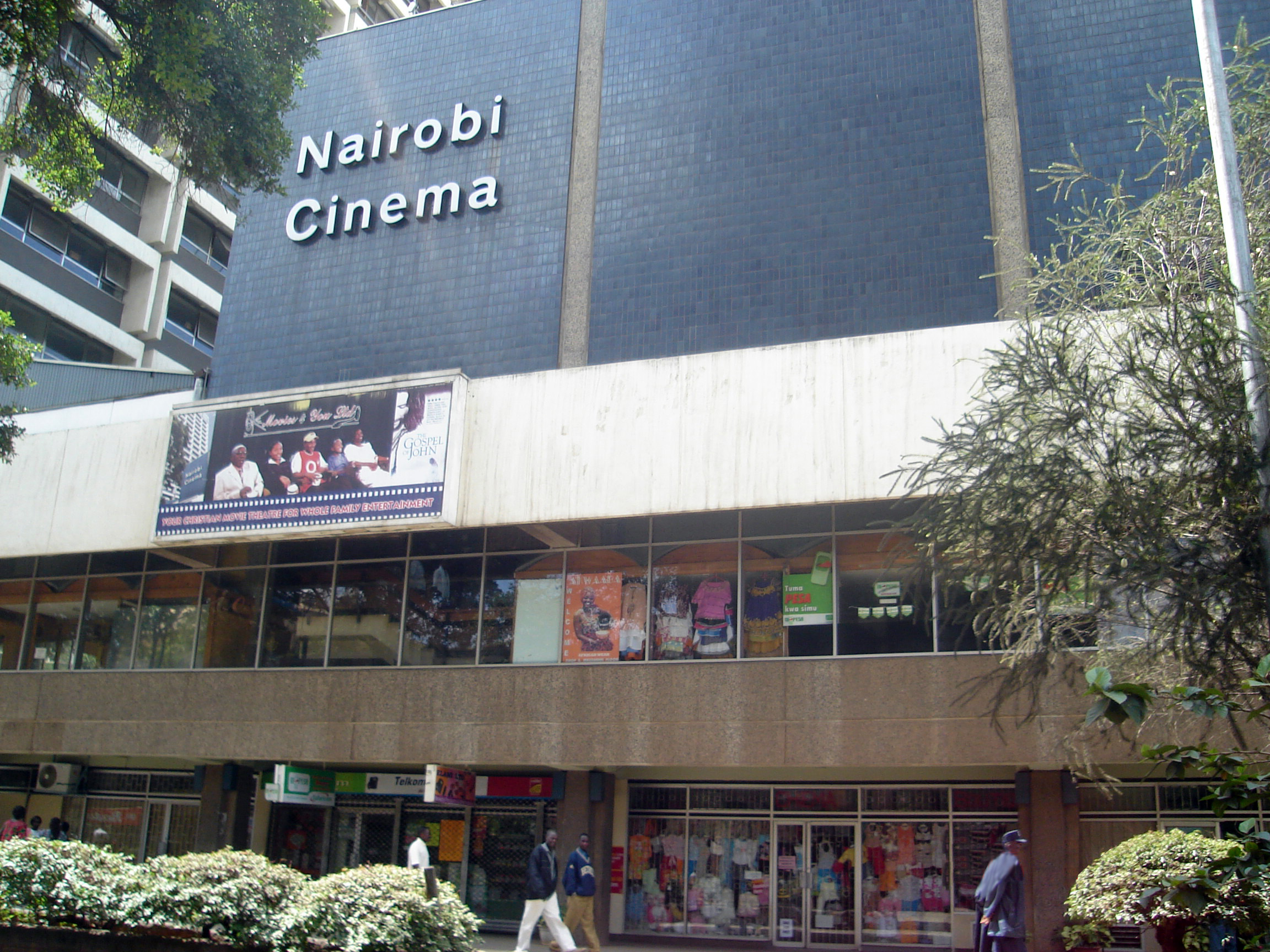
The Nairobi Cinema

Kwani? is Kenya's first literary journal and was established by writers living in Nairobi. Nairobi's publishing houses have also produced the works of some of Kenya's authors, including Ngũgĩ wa Thiong'o and Meja Mwangi who were part of post-colonial writing.

Many film makers also practice their craft out of Nairobi. Film-making is still young in the country, but people like producer Njeri Karago and director Judy Kibinge are paving the way for others.

Perhaps the most famous book and film set in Nairobi is Out of Africa. The book was written by Karen Blixen, whose pseudonym was Isak Dinesen, and it is her account of living in Kenya. Karen Blixen lived in the Nairobi area from 1917 to 1931. The neighbourhood in which she lived, Karen, is named after her.

In 1985, Out of Africa was made into a film, directed by Sydney Pollack. The film won 28 awards, including seven Academy Awards. The popularity of the film prompted the opening of Nairobi's Karen Blixen Museum.

Nairobi is the setting of many of the novels of Ngũgĩ wa Thiong'o, Kenya's foremost writer.

Nairobi has been the set of several other American and British films. The most recent of these was The Constant Gardener (2005), a large part of which was filmed in the city. The story revolves around a British diplomat in Nairobi whose wife is murdered in northern Kenya. Much of the filming was in the Kibera slum.

Among the latest Kenyan actors in Hollywood who identify with Nairobi is Lupita Nyong'o. Lupita received an Oscar award for best supporting actress in her role as Patsy in the film 12 Years a Slave during the 86th Academy Awards at the Dolby theatre in Los Angeles. Lupita is the daughter of Kenyan politician Peter Anyang' Nyong'o.

Most new Hollywood films are nowadays screened at Nairobi's cinemas. Up until the early 1990s, there were only a few film theatres and the repertoire was limited. There are also two drive-in cinemas in Nairobi.

In 2015 and 2016, Nairobi was the focus point for the American television series Sense8 which shot its first and second seasons partly in the city. The TV series has high reviews in The Internet Movie Database (IMDb).

In 2015 Nairobi was featured in the British thriller film Eye in the Sky, which is a story about a lieutenant general and a colonel who faced political opposition after ordering a drone missile strike to take out a group of suicide bombers in Nairobi.

In 2017, the name "Nairobi" was taken as a code-name by a female main character in the famous Spanish TV series Money Heist.

=== Food ===
In Nairobi, there are a range of restaurants. Besides being home to nyama choma which is a local term used to refer to roasted meat, there are American fast food restaurants such as KFC, Subway, Domino's Pizza, Pizza Hut, Hardee's and Burger King, and the longer established South African chains, Galito's, Steers, PizzaMojo, and Spur Steak Ranches.

Coffee houses, doubling up as restaurants and mostly frequented by the upper middle classes, such as Artcaffe Nairobi Java House and Dormans, have become increasingly popular in recent days. Traditional food joints such as the popular K'osewe's in the city centre and Amaica, which specialize in African delicacies, are widespread.

The Kenchic franchise which specialized in old-school chicken and chips meals was popular, particularly among the lower classes and students, with restaurants all over the city and its suburbs. However, as of February 2016, Kenchic stopped operating its eatery business. Upscale restaurants often specialize in specific cuisines such as Italian, Lebanese, Ethiopian, and French, but are more likely to be found in five star hotels and the wealthier suburbs in the West and South of the city.

Nairobi has an annual restaurant week (NRW) at the beginning of the year, January–February. Nairobi's restaurants offer dining packages at reduced prices. NRW is managed by Eatout Kenya which is an online platform that lists and reviews restaurants in Nairobi, and provides a platform for Kenyan foodies to congregate and share.

=== Music ===
Nairobi is the centre of Kenya's music scene. Benga is a Kenyan genre which was developed in Nairobi. The style is a fusion of jazz and Luo music forms. Mugithi is another popular genre in Kenya, with its origins in the central parts of the country. A majority of music videos of leading local musicians are also filmed in the city.

In the 1970s, Nairobi became the prominent centre for music in the African Great Lakes. During this period, Nairobi was established as a hub of soukous music. This genre was originally developed in Kinshasa and Brazzaville. After the political climate in the region deteriorated, many Congolese artists relocated to Nairobi. Artists such as Orchestra Super Mazembe moved from Congo to Nairobi and found great success. Virgin records became aware of the popularity of the genre and signed recording contracts with several soukous artists.

More recently, Nairobi has become the centre of the Kenyan hip-hop scene. The genre has become very popular amongst local youth, and domestic musicians have become some of the most popular in the region. Successful artists based in Nairobi include Jua Cali, Nonini, Camp Mulla, Juliani, Eric Wainaina, and Nameless. Popular record labels include Ogopa DJs and Calif Records.

Nairobi, including the coastal towns of Mombasa and Diani, have recently become the centre of EDM in Kenya, producing DJs as well as producers like DJ Fita.

Many nightclubs in and around the city have witnessed a growth in the population that exclusively listen to Electronic Dance Music, especially amongst the younger generations. Gospel music is also popular in Nairobi just as in the rest of Kenya, with gospel artists having a great impact in the mostly Christian city.

Musical group Sauti Sol performed for U.S. President Barack Obama when he was in the city for the 2015 Global Entrepreneurship Summit.

== Sports ==
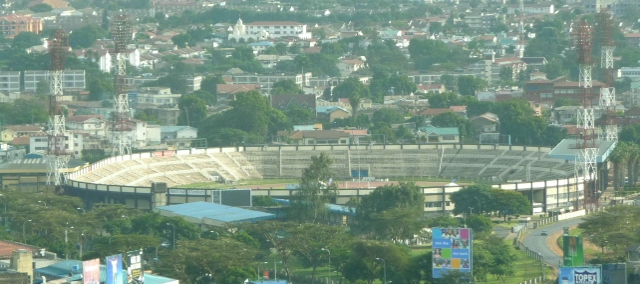
Nyayo National Stadium

Nairobi is the African Great Lakes region's sporting centre. Notable annual events staged in Nairobi include Safari Rally, Safari Sevens rugby union tournament, and Nairobi Marathon.

=== Facilities ===
The premier sports facility in Nairobi and generally in Kenya is the Moi International Sports Centre in the suburb of Kasarani. The complex was completed in 1987, and was used to host the 1987 All Africa Games. The complex comprises a 60,000 seater stadium, the second largest in the African Great Lakes (after Tanzania's new national stadium), a 5,000 seater gymnasium, and a 2,000 seater aquatics centre. In 2029, the venue will host the World Athletics Championships. It will be the first World Athletics Championships to be ever held in Africa.

The Nyayo National Stadium is Nairobi's second largest stadium renowned for hosting global rugby event under the "Safaricom Sevens". Completed in 1983, the stadium has a capacity of 30,000. This stadium is primarily used for football. The facility is located close to the Central Business District, which makes it a convenient location for political gatherings.

Nairobi City Stadium is Nairobi's first stadium, and used for club football.

Nairobi Gymkhana is the home of the Kenyan cricket team, and was a venue for the 2003 Cricket World Cup.

Ulinzi Sports Complex was officially opened by President Uhuru Kenyatta in 2022 after its construction that started in 2020. It has a capacity of 7,500, an 8-lane Athletics track, training grounds and an indoor arena.

Dandora Stadium, a 4,000 capacity stadium opened in 2024, hosts some of the top flight national league football tournaments. The stadium has seats in the VIP section and regular stands.

Talanta Sports Stadium, with a capacity of 60,000, is currently under construction with an estimated completion date of February 2026.

=== Football ===
Football is the most popular sport in the city by viewership and participation. This is highlighted by the number of football clubs in the city, including Kenyan Premier League sides Gor Mahia, A.F.C. Leopards Sports Club, Tusker F. C. and Mathare United.

Kenya, together with Tanzania and Uganda will be cohosting the 2025 CHAN competition. Also, the three countries will jointly host the 2027 AFCON football competition.

=== Golf ===
There are several golf courses within a 20 km radius of Nairobi. The oldest 18-hole golf course in the city is the Royal Nairobi Golf Club. It was established in 1906 by the British, just seven years after the city was founded. Other notable golf clubs include the Windsor Golf Hotel and Country Club, Karen Country Club, VetLab Sports Club, Golf Park Golf Club, Kenya Railways Golf Club, Sigona Golf Club and Muthaiga Golf Club.

The Kenya Open golf tournament, which is part of the European Tour, takes place in Nairobi.

=== Equestrian Sports ===
The Ngong Racecourse in Nairobi is the centre of horse racing in Kenya.

The Kenya Open Polo tournament and other polo games are often hosted at the Nairobi Polo Club.

The Horse Association of Kenya offices are located in Nairobi, at Racecourse.

=== Rugby ===
Rugby is a popular sport in Nairobi with 8 of the 12 top flight clubs based here.

The Rugby Football Union of East Africa (RFUEA) is hosted in Nairobi.

=== Basketball ===
Basketball is a popular sport played in the city's primary, Secondary and college leagues. Many of the city's urban youth are basketball fans and watch the American NBA.

=== Marathons ===
Nairobi often hosts a number of marathons including:

- Nairobi City Marathon
- Standard Chartered Nairobi Marathon

== Places of worship ==
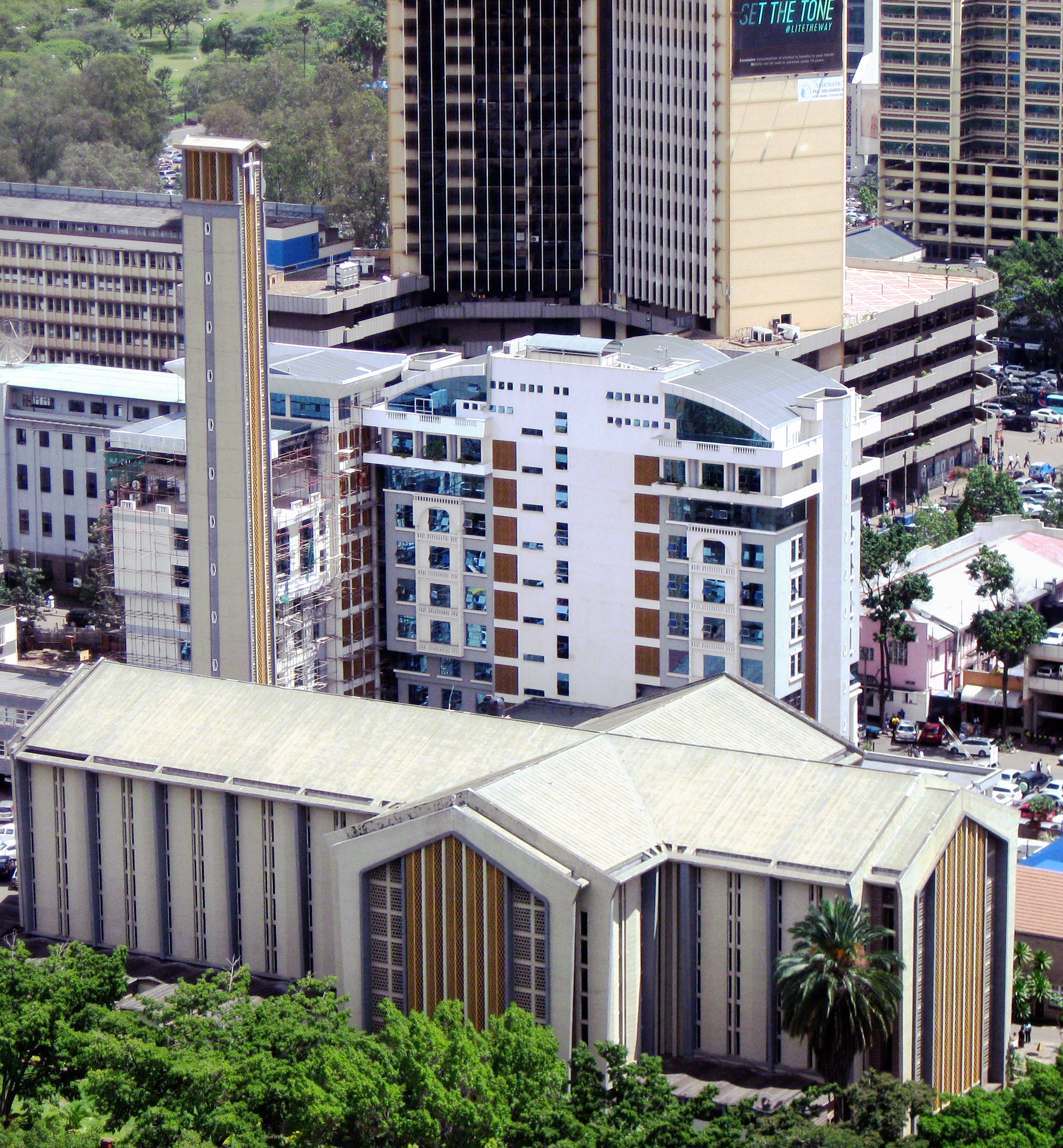
The Basilica of the Holy Family in Nairobi

The places of worship are predominantly Christian churches and temples: Roman Catholic Archdiocese of Nairobi (Catholic Church), Anglican Church of Kenya (Anglican Communion), Presbyterian Church of East Africa (World Communion of Reformed Churches), Baptist Convention of Kenya (Baptist World Alliance), and Assemblies of God. There are also Muslim mosques including Jamia Mosque.

== Education ==
The majority of schools follow the Kenyan Competence Based Education (CBE). Nairobi Innovation Week (NIW) is an annual that was started in 2015. It is organized by the University of Nairobi and in collaboration with government agencies. It focuses on partnerships, innovations, incubation, and startups. It promotes an entrepreneurial culture. It is an event for local and international innovators to showcase innovations, and to network.

=== Higher education ===
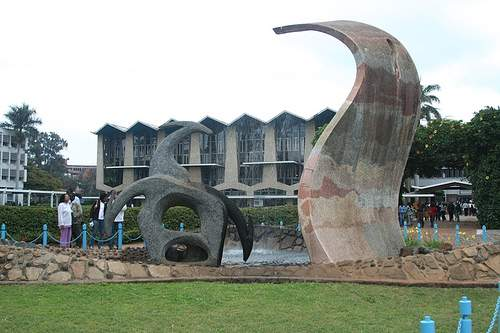
The University of Nairobi

Nairobi is home to several Universities and Colleges.

- The University of Nairobi is the largest and oldest university in Kenya. It was established in 1956, as part of the University of East Africa, but became an independent university in 1970. The university has approximately 84,000 students.
- Kenyatta University is situated 16 km (9.9 mi) from Nairobi on the Nairobi road Thika dual carriageway on 450 hectares (1,100 acres) of land. The university was chartered in 1985, offering mainly education-related courses, but has since diversified, offering medicine, environmental studies, engineering, law, business, statistics, agriculture, and economics. It has a student body of about 32,000, the bulk of whom (17,000) are in the main campus. It is one of the fastest-growing public universities.
- Strathmore University started in 1961 as an Advanced Level (UK) Sixth Form College offering Science and Arts subjects. The college started to admit accountancy students in March 1966, and thus became a university. In January 1993, Strathmore College merged with Kianda College and moved to Ole Sangale Road, Madaraka Estate, Nairobi.
- United States International University – Nairobi was originally a branch of the United States International University, but became a fully autonomous university in 2005. It was first established in 1969. The university has accreditation from the Western Association of Schools and Colleges, in the US, and the Government of Kenya. It is located in a quiet west side location of Roysambu area north-central Nairobi opposite the Safari Park Hotel.
- In 2005, The Aga Khan Hospital, Nairobi was upgraded to a health sciences teaching hospital, providing post graduate education in medicine and surgery including nursing education, henceforth renamed the Aga Khan University Hospital.
- The Catholic University of Eastern Africa located in Lang'ata suburb, obtained its "Letter of Interim Authority" in 1989. Following negotiations between the Authority of the Graduate School of Theology and the Commission for Higher Education (CHIEA), the Faculty of Arts and Social Sciences was established three years later, culminating in the granting of the Civil Charter to CHIEA on 3 November 1992.
- The Technical University of Kenya (formerly Kenya Polytechnic) is the only Technical University in the country. Established in 1961 as the Kenya Technical Institute, the university was chartered by Mwai Kibaki in 2013 to become an independent institution of higher learning (It was previously a constituent college of the University of Nairobi). It offers highly technical degree courses in three faculties: Engineering and Built Environment, Applied Sciences and Technologies, and Social Sciences and Technologies.
- KCA University (formerly the Kenya College of Accountancy), located in Ruaraka.
- Pan African Christian University is located along Lumumba Drive, Roysambu.
- East Africa Institute of Certified Studies (well known as ICS College) is located at Stanbank House with branches in Mombasa and Kisumu.
- Compugoal College
- Pioneer International University in Ngara.
- Riara University on Mbagathi road.
- Multimedia University of Kenya
- Daystar university
- Africa International University
- Cooperative university of Kenya Islamic University of Kenya

Numerous other universities have opened satellite campuses in Nairobi. The Railways Training Institute established in 1956, is a notable institution of higher learning with a campus in Nairobi.

== Infrastructure ==
=== Transport ===
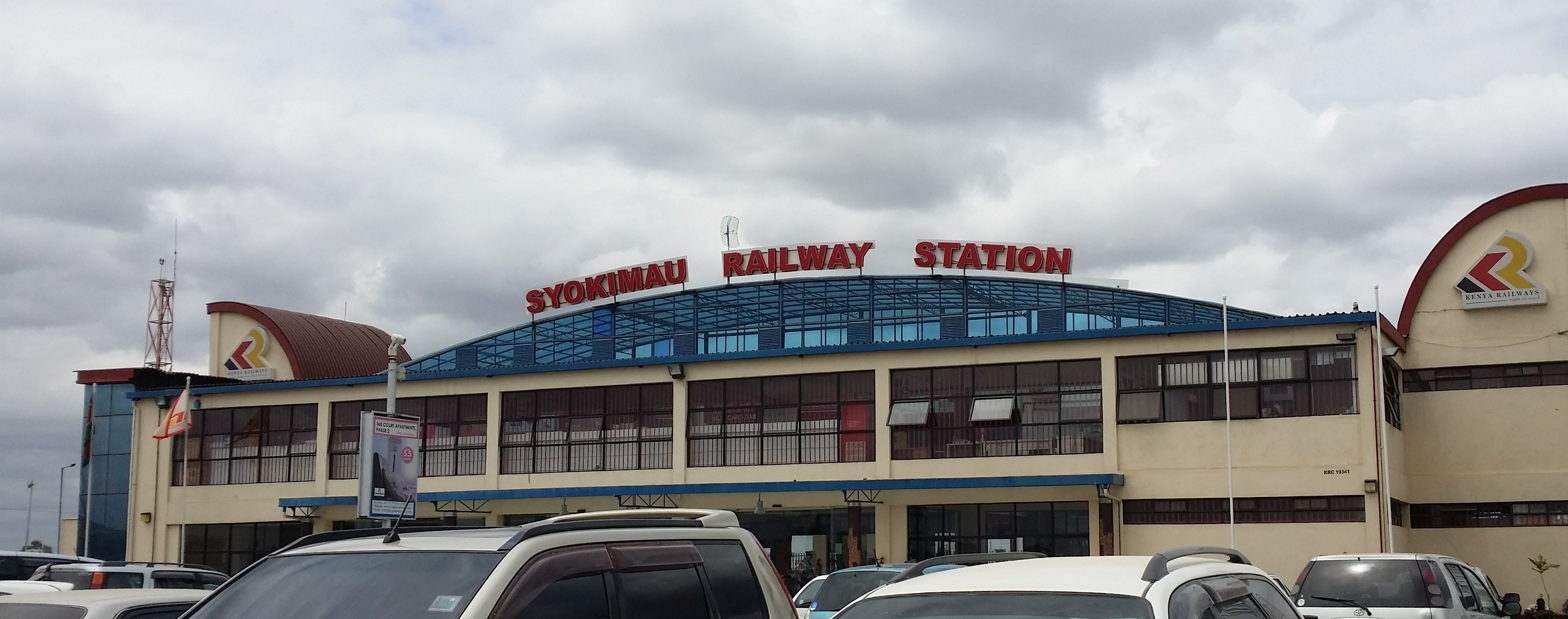
Syokimau Railway Station

Major plans are being implemented in the need to decongest the city's traffic and the completion of Thika Road has given the city a much needed face-lift attributed to road's enhancement of global standards. Several projects have been completed, such as Syokimau Rail Station, the Eastern and Northern Bypasses, while numerous other projects are still underway.

The development of these critical transport facilities will, besides reducing transport costs due to faster movement of goods and people within the region, also increase trade, improve the socio-economic welfare of Northern Kenya and boost the country's potential in attracting investments from all over the world.

==== Airports ====
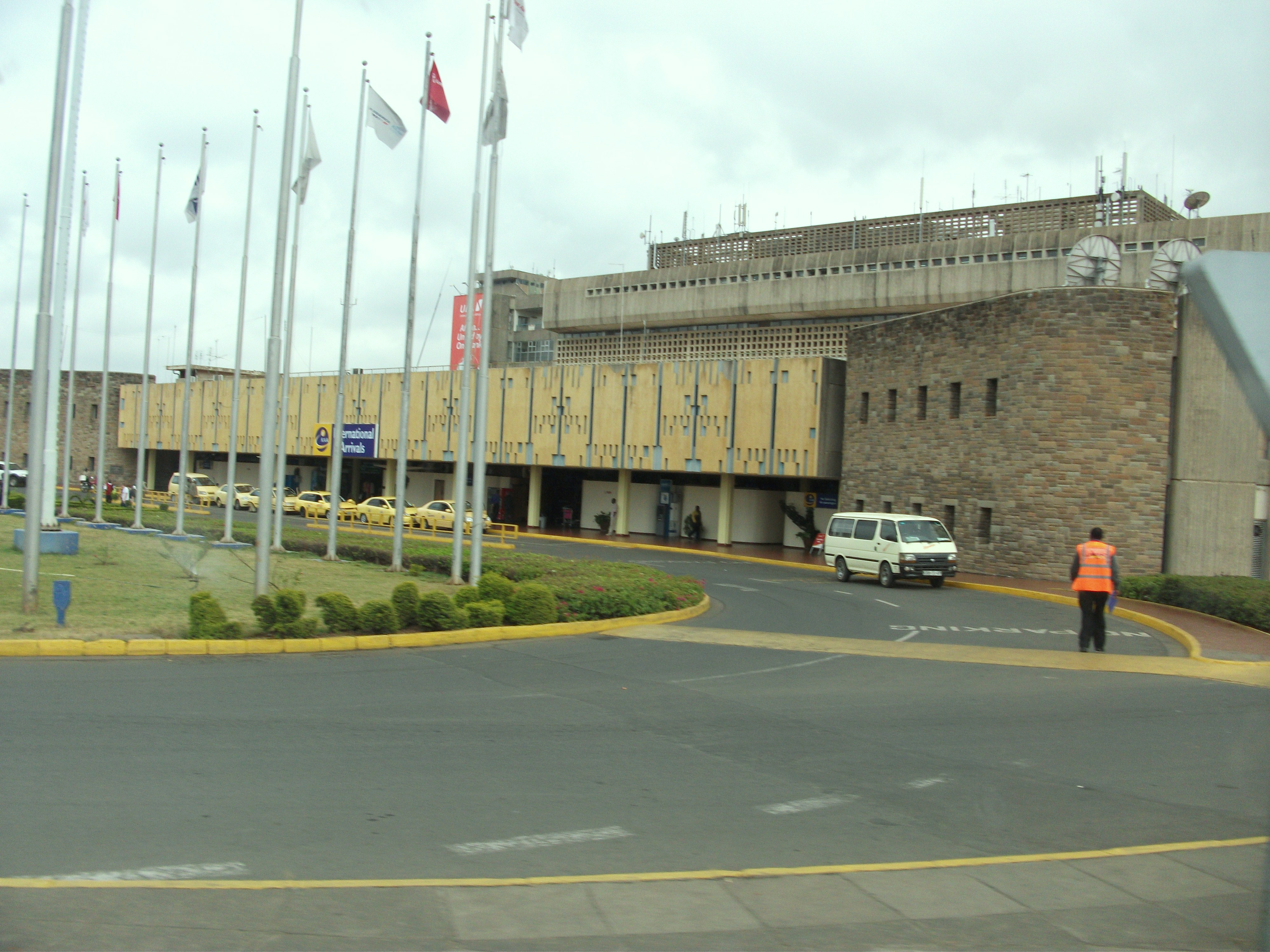
Jomo Kenyatta International Airport

Jomo Kenyatta International Airport is the largest airport in Kenya. Domestic travellers made up 40% of overall passengers in 2016, an increase of 32% since 2012. JKIA had more than 7 million passengers pass through it in 2016. In February 2017, JKIA received a Category One Status from the FAA, boosting the airport's status as a Regional Aviation hub.

Wilson Airport is a general-aviation airport handling smaller aircraft, mostly propeller-driven. In July 2016, construction of a new air traffic control tower commenced at a cost of KES 163 million (approximately US$1.63 million).

Moi Air Base is a military airport. In its earlier years, it was utilised as a landing strip in the pre-jet airline era. It was mostly used as a British passenger and mail route from Southampton to Cape Town in the 1930s and 1940s. This route was served by flying boats between Britain and Kisumu and then by land-based aircraft on the routes to the south.

==== Matatu ====
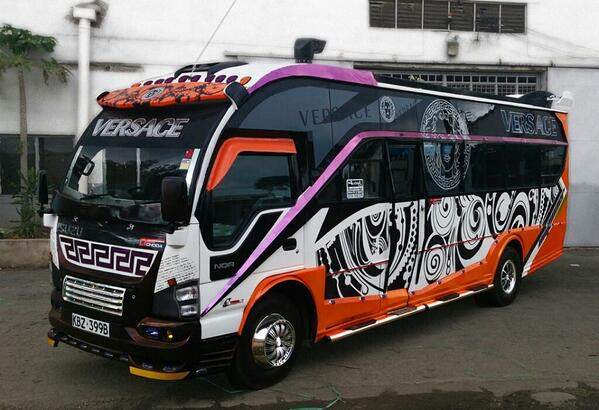
A matatu

Matatus are the most common form of public transport in Nairobi. Matatu, which literally translates to "three cents for a ride" (nowadays much more) are privately owned minibuses. They generally seat 14 to 33 riders. Matatus operate within Nairobi, its environs and suburbs and from Nairobi to other towns around the country. The matatu's route is imprinted along a yellow stripe on the side of the bus, and matatus plying specific routes have specific route numbers.

In 2004, a law was passed, requiring all matatus to include seat belts, speed governors and to be painted with a yellow stripe. At first, this caused a furore amongst Matatu operators, but they were pressured by government and the public to make the changes. Matatus are now limited to 80 km/h (50 mph).

In November 2014 President Uhuru Kenyatta lifted the ban on the yellow stripe and allowed matatus to maintain the colourful graphics in an effort to support the youth in creating employment. Matatus in Nairobi were easily distinguishable by their extravagant paint schemes, as owners would paint their matatu with various colourful decorations, such as their favourite football team or hip-hop artist. They are notorious for their poor safety records, which are a result of overcrowding and reckless driving. Due to the intense competition between matatus, many are equipped inside with powerful sound systems and television sets to attract more customers.

==== Buses ====
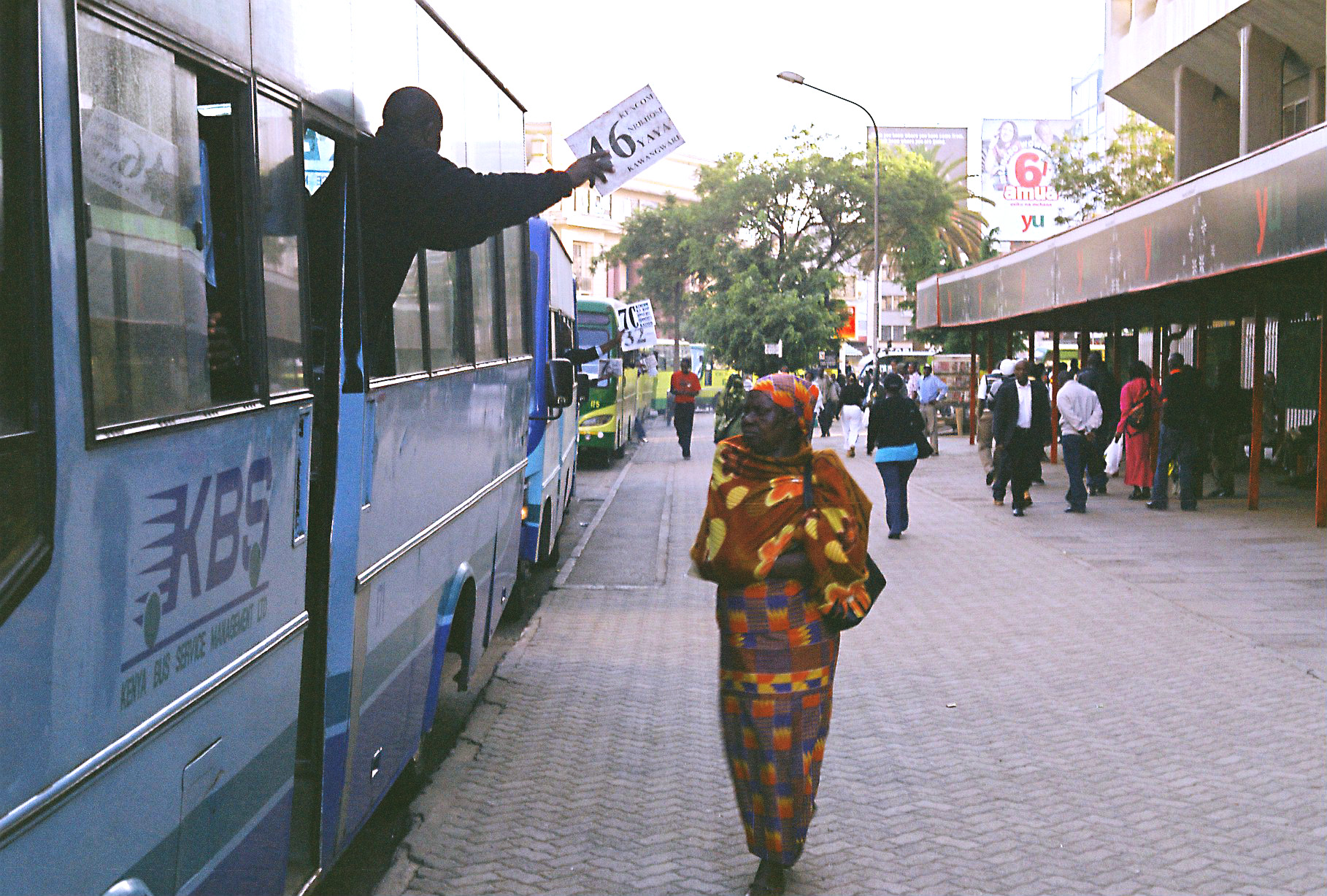
Public transport in Nairobi

Buses are increasingly becoming common in the city with some even going to the extents of installing complimentary WiFi systems in partnership with the leading mobile service provider. There are four major bus companies operating the city routes and are the traditional Kenya Bus Service (KBS), and newer private operators Citi Hoppa, Compliant MOA and Double M. The Citi Hoppa buses are distinguishable by their green livery, the Double M buses are painted purple, Compliant MOA by their distinctively screaming names and mix of white, blue colours while the KBS buses are painted blue.

Companies such as Easy Coach, Guardian Angel, Transline, Tahmeed, NorthWest, Kisii Classic and Ena coach scheduled buses and luxury coaches to other cities and towns.

A Bus rapid transit will commence operating with 100 high capacity buses along Thika Road in July 2022 between Kasarani and the Kenyatta National Hospital. After the pilot, Nairobi Metropolitan Area Transport Authority (Namata) will implement another 300 buses as the first phase that will expand the BRT line to run from Ruiru to Kenyatta National Hospital. A second phase will later extend the line to run between Kenol in Murang'a County to Ongata Rongai in Kajiado County.

==== Trains ====
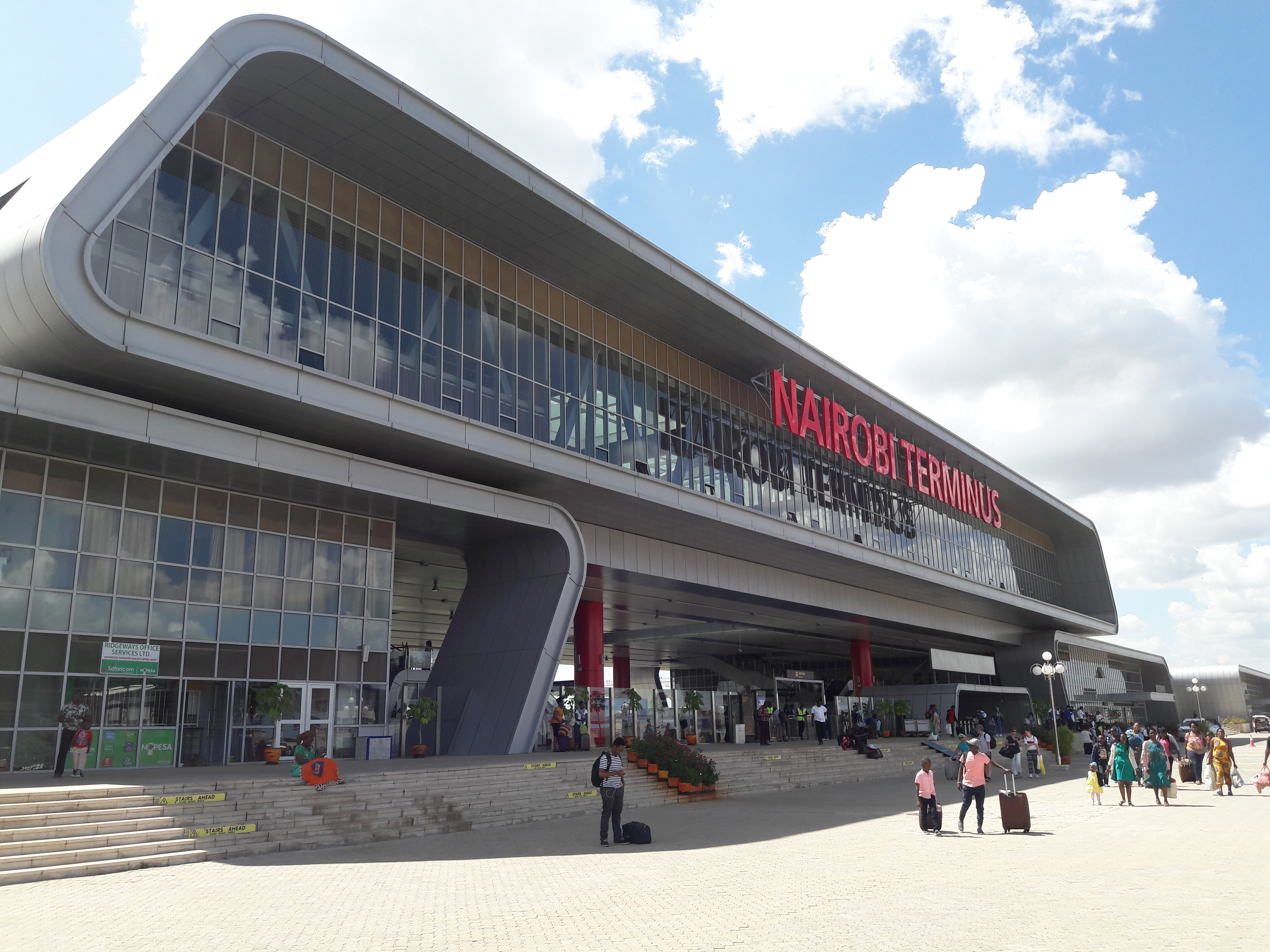
Nairobi Terminus

Nairobi was founded as a railway town, and the main headquarters of Kenya Railways (KR) is still situated at Nairobi railway station, which is located near the city centre. The line runs through Nairobi, from Mombasa to Kampala. Its main use is freight traffic connecting Nairobi to Mombasa and Kisumu. A number of morning and evening commuter trains connect the centre with the suburbs, but the city has no proper light rail, tramway, or rapid transit lines. A proposal has been passed for the construction of a commuter rail line.

In November 2012, President Mwai Kibaki launched the Syokimau Rail Service, marking a major milestone in the history of railway development in Kenya. The opening of the station marked another milestone in efforts to realise various projects envisaged under the Vision 2030 Economic Blueprint. The new station has a train that ferries passengers from Syokimau to the city centre cutting travel time by half.

The opening of the station marks the completion of the first phase of the Sh24b Nairobi Commuter Rail Network that is geared at easing traffic congestion in Nairobi, blamed for huge economic losses. Other modern stations include Imara Daima Railway Station and Makadara Railway Station.

The new Mombasa–Nairobi Standard Gauge Railway connects the port city of Mombasa and Nairobi. The new railway line has virtually replaced the old metre-gauge railway. The Nairobi Terminus is located at Syokimau, some 20 km from the city centre. Passengers travelling from Mombasa are transferred the short distance into the CBD with the metre-gauge trains.

==== Roads ====
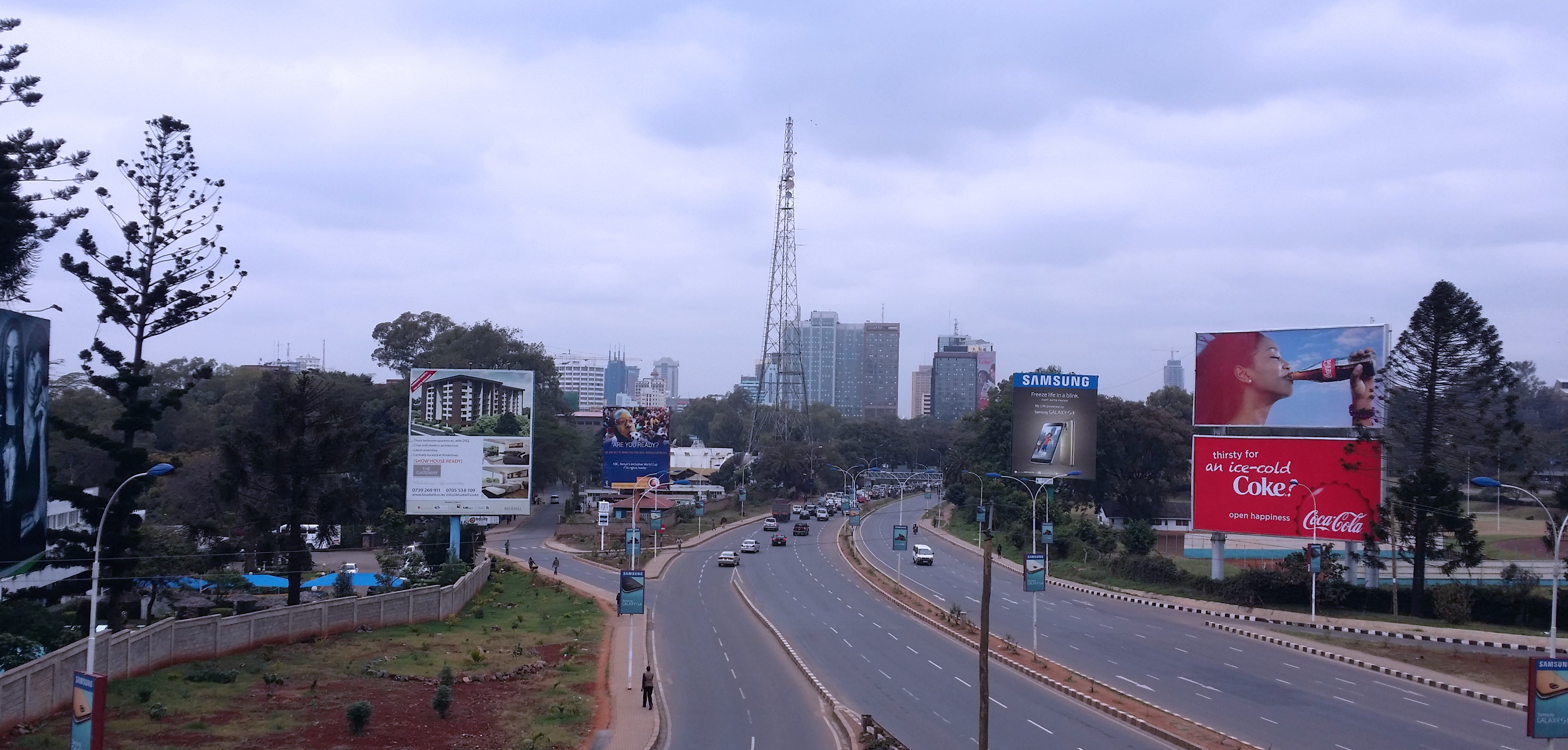
The A104 heading to Nairobi CBD

Two trans-African automobile routes pass through Nairobi: the Cairo-Cape Town Highway and the Lagos-Mombasa Highway. Nairobi is served by highways that link Mombasa to Kampala in Uganda and Arusha in Tanzania. These are earmarked to ease the daily motor traffic within and surrounding the metro area. However, driving in Nairobi is chaotic. Most of the roads are tarmacked and there are signs showing directions to certain neighbourhoods.

Nairobi is connected to the Jomo Kenyatta International Airport by the Mombasa Highway, which passes through Industrial Area, South B, South C and Embakasi. Ongata Rongai, Langata and Karen are connected to the city centre by Langata Road, which runs to the south. Lavington, Riverside, and Westlands are connected by Waiyaki Way. Kasarani, Eastlands, and Embakasi are connected by Thika Road, Jogoo Road, and Outer Ring Road.

Highways connect the city with other major towns such as Mombasa, Machakos, Voi, (A109), Eldoret, Kisumu, Nakuru, Naivasha, and Namanga Border Tanzania (A104).

Nairobi is undergoing major road constructions to update its infrastructure network. The new system of roads, flyovers, and bridges are intended to better cope with high traffic levels. It is also a major component of Kenya's Vision 2030 and Nairobi Metropolis plans. Most roads now are well lit and surfaced with adequate signage.

In 2020, the construction of The Nairobi Expressway began. The Nairobi expressway is a 27 km toll road connecting the Eastern Nairobi neighbourhood of Mulolongo to the uptown neighbourhood of Westlands at James Gichuru junction through Nairobi CBD. The road is directly to the Jomo Kenyatta International Airport enabling travellers to access the airport faster avoiding the heavy traffic on Mombasa Road and Waiyaki Way. The road has an 11.025 km elevated section between Airtel Center and Westlands.

This road, is intended to ease traffic from Jomo Kenyatta International Airport that accesses Nairobi city centre. Also traffic from Central Nairobi is expected to be facilitated, to reduce the number of departing passengers who miss their fights, while stuck in road traffic jams on the city streets.[5] The work involves expansion of the existing road to four-lanes one-way, (8 lanes total), with foot paths, drainage channels, overpass bridges and street lighting. It was opened to the public in May 2022.

==== Private car population projection for Nairobi ====
YEAR	2004	2010	2015	2025
Number of private cars	207,339	327,366	486,207	716,138

=== Water supply and sanitation ===
94% of the piped water supply for Nairobi comes from rivers and reservoirs in the Aberdare Range north of the city, of which the reservoir of the Thika Dam is the most important one. Water distribution losses – technically called non-revenue water – are 40%, and only 40% of those with house connections receive water continuously. Slum residents receive water through water kiosks and end up paying much higher water prices than those fortunate enough to have access to piped water at their residence.

=== Housing ===
There is a wide variety of housing options in Nairobi. The options range from privately owned housing units/apartments, rented units, leased spaces and even houses on mortgage. Most wealthy Kenyans live in Nairobi, but the majority of Nairobians are of average and low income. Half of the population has been estimated to live in slums which cover just 5% of the city area. The growth of these slums is a result of urbanisation, poor town planning, lack of good governance and proper leadership in these settlements and lack of empowerment and social capital among other factors.

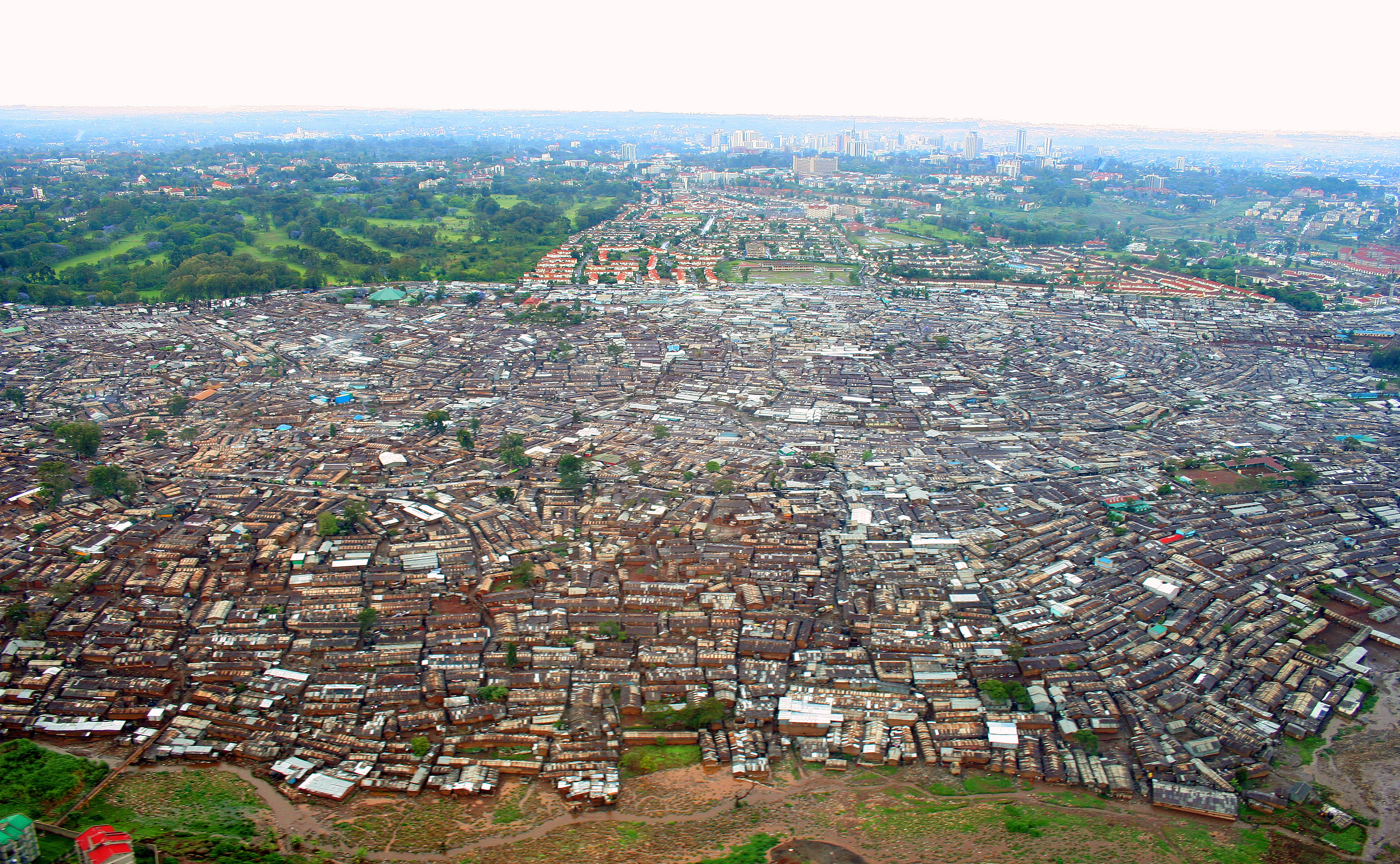
A view of Kibera, Nairobi

Kibera is one of the largest slums in Africa, and is situated to the west of Nairobi. (Kibera comes from the Nubian word Kibra, meaning "forest" or "jungle"). The slums cover two square kilometres and are on government land. Kibera has been the setting for several films, the most recent being The Constant Gardener.

Other notable slums include Mathare and Korogocho. Altogether, 66 areas are counted as slums within Nairobi.

Many Nairobi non-slum-dwellers live in relatively good housing conditions. Large houses can be found in many of the upmarket neighbourhoods, especially to the west of Nairobi. Middle and high income estates include Gigiri, Muthaiga, Langata and Karen. Other middle and high income estates include Parklands, Westlands, Hurlingham, Kilimani, Milimani, Spring Valley, Lavington, Rosslyn, Kitisuru, and Nairobi Hill.

To accommodate the growing middle class, many new apartments and housing developments are being built in and around the city. The most notable development is Greenpark, at Athi River, Machakos County 25 km (16 mi) from Nairobi's Central Business District. Over 5,000 houses, villas and apartments are being constructed at this development, including leisure, retail and commercial facilities. The development is being marketed to families, as are most others within the city. Eastlands also houses most of the city's middle class and includes South C, South B, Embakasi, Buru Buru, Komarock, Donholm, Umoja, Saika, Ruai, Kasarani and various others.

== Crime and law enforcement ==
Crime levels and safety have very much improved in Nairobi over recent years. Violent crime is rare but petty crime can still be an issue. In general, petty crime in Nairobi mostly involves pickpocketing and theft, and on rare occasions can be confrontational. Although there have been a handful of isolated attacks in Kenya by Al Shabaab from neighbouring Somalia, these incidences are rare.

== Media ==
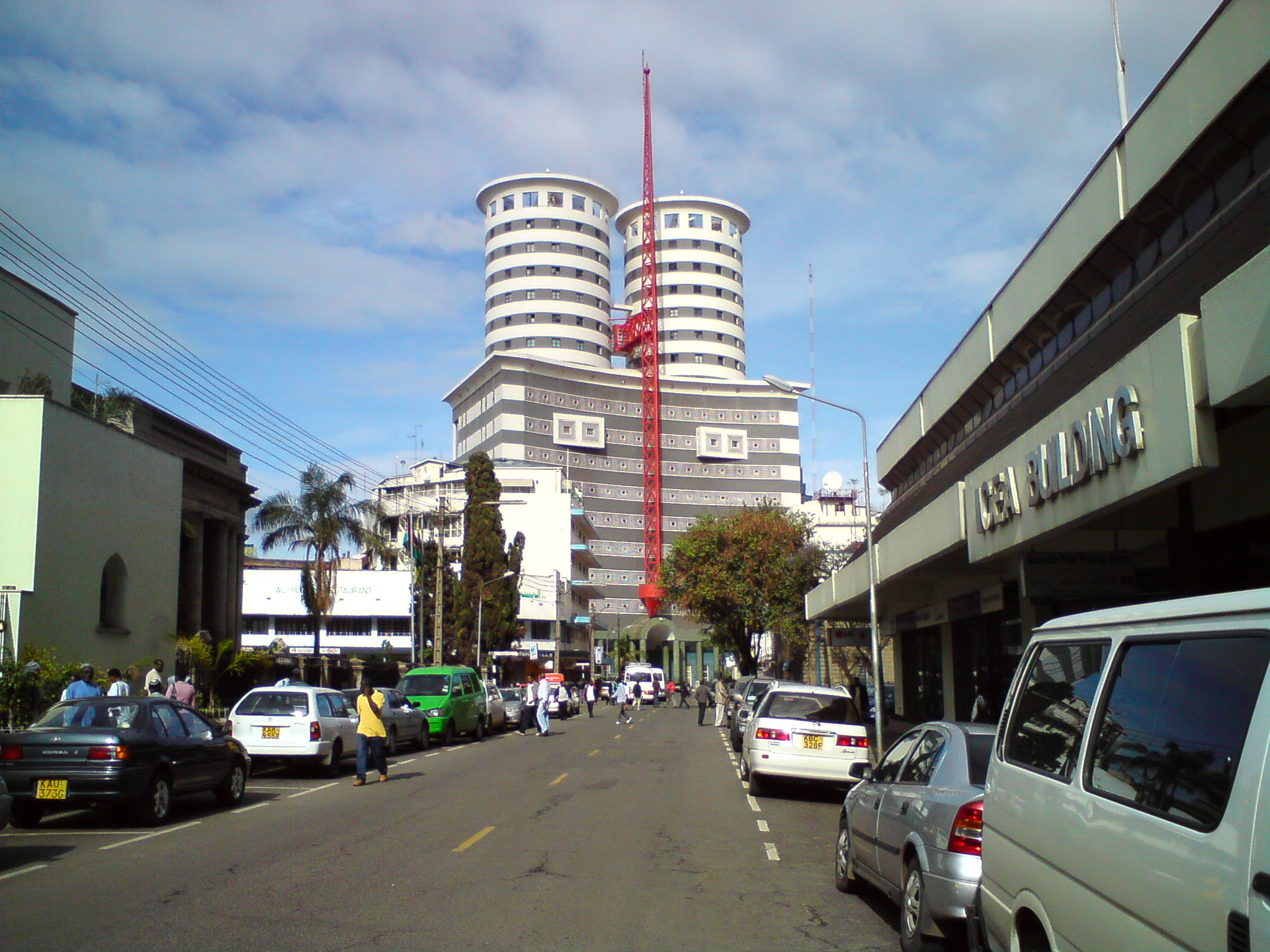

Nairobi is home to most of Kenya's news and media organisations. The city is also home to the region's largest newspapers: the Daily Nation and The Standard. These are circulated within Kenya and cover a range of domestic and regional issues. Both newspapers are published in English. People Daily is also the leading free newspaper distributed on the streets of Nairobi. It is published by Mediamax Limited.

Kenya Broadcasting Corporation, a state-run television and radio station, is headquartered in the city. Kenya Television Network is part of the Standard Group and was Kenya's first privately owned TV station. The Nation Media Group runs NTV which is based in Nairobi, The Royal Media Services (RMS). There are also a number of prominent radio stations located in Kenya's capital including Citizen radio, Inooro fm, KISS 100, Capital FM, East FM, Kameme FM, Metro FM, and Family FM, among others.

Several multinational media organisations have their regional headquarters in Nairobi. These include the BBC, CNN, Agence France-Presse, Reuters, Deutsche Welle, and the Associated Press. The East African bureau of CNBC Africa is located in Nairobi's city centre, while the Nairobi bureau of The New York Times is located in the suburb of Gigiri. The broadcast headquarters of CCTV Africa are located in Nairobi.

== Notable people ==
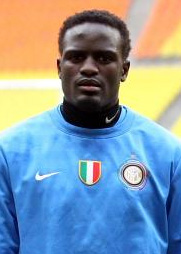
McDonald Mariga Wanyama

- Ishmael Awange (born 1989), basketball player
- Marylize Biubwa, intersectional feminist and activist
- Dvora Bochman (born 1950), Israeli artist, painter, sculptor, graphic designer and art educator
- Elsa Conrad (1887–1963), German businesswoman and night club entrepreneur
- Richard Dawkins (born 1941), British evolutionary biologist
- Roshanara Ebrahim (born 1993), TV host, model, author and beauty pageant titleholder
- Chris Froome (born 1985), born in Nairobi, British professional cyclist 4x Tour de France winner
- Edi Gathegi (born 1979), actor
- Fena Gitu (born 1991), rapper
- Polly Irungu, photographer and journalist
- Pamela Jelimo (born 1989), Olympic champion runner
- Wanuri Kahiu (born 1980), film director, producer, and author
- Mike Kirkland (born 1947), rally driver
- Mary Douglas Leakey (1913–1996), paleoanthropologist
- Richard Erskine Frere Leakey (1944–2022), paleoanthropologist, conservationist and politician
- Prosper Masatu Makonya, Tanzanian sportsperson
- Susan Murabana, astronomer
- Alice Wairimu Nderitu (born 1968), human rights activist, and United Nations Under-Secretary-General and Special Adviser on the Prevention of Genocide to UN Secretary-General
- Nuni Omot (born 1994), basketball player in the Israeli Basketball Premier League
- Dorothy Ooko, activist and technology professional
- Aaron Rimbui (born 1979), pianist, keyboardist, bandleader, producer, festival curator, and radio host
- Njeri Rionge (1966–2023) , technology entrepreneur who was a co-founder of the Internet Service Provider (ISP) Wananchi Online Limited (WOL)
- Johnny Rozsa, photographer
- Israel Somen (1903–1984), Mayor of Nairobi
- Jonathan Somen (born 1969), co-founder of Access Kenya Group
- Abdi Salim (born 2001), Somali footballer
- Carl Tundo (born 1973), rally driver
- Jeremy Wahome (born 1998), racing driver
- McDonald Mariga Wanyama (born 1987), politician and retired footballer
- Victor Wanyama (born 1991), footballer
- Winfred Omwakwe (born 1981), Miss Earth 2002 (Succeed)

== Pop culture ==
Rise and Fall of Idi Amin, also referred to as Amin: The Rise and Fall, is a 1981 biographical film by Sharad Patel. The movie details the controversial actions and atrocities of the once dictator of Uganda, Idi Amin, in the time of his violent rise to power in 1971 until he descends in 1979 as the result of Uganda–Tanzania uprising. The movie depicts some of the roles Nairobi as the political hub of Kenya served in opposing the Ugandan dictator, including the coordination between Tel Aviv and Nairobi during operation Entebe.

In 2012, a Kenyan drama film directed by David "Tosh" Gitonga named Nairobi Half Life came to the big screen. The film was selected as the Kenyan entry for the Best Foreign Language Oscar at the 85th Academy Awards, but did not make the final shortlist, and is the first time Kenya has submitted a film in this category.

Nairobi inspired the nicknaming of the character Ágata Jiménez as 'Nairobi'; a fictional character in the Netflix series Money Heist, portrayed by Alba Flores. She serves as the quality manager of the group, in charge of printing money in the Royal Mint of Spain in parts 1 and 2, and overseeing the melting of gold in the Bank of Spain in parts 3 and 4. She is widely considered to be the show's most popular character.

== Twin towns and sister cities ==
Nairobi is twinned with:

- Addis Ababa, Ethiopia
- Cape Town, South Africa
- Denver, United States
- Kunming, China
- Lowell, United States
- Raleigh, United States
- São Luís, Brazil
