= Constituencies of Kenya =

Electoral divisions of Kenyan Parliament

- The 290 constituencies of Kenya
- Category: Electoral district
- Location: Kenya
- Number: 290 (as of 2012)
- Government: National Assembly
- Subdivisions: Electoral wards

The constituencies of Kenya are used to elect members of the National Assembly, the lower chamber of the Kenyan Parliament. In accordance with Article 89 of the 2010 Constitution of Kenya, there are 290 constituencies, based on a formula where these constituencies were to be delineated based on population numbers. Each constituency returns one Member of National Assembly. The constituencies are further divided into electoral wards.

== Overview ==
Constituencies were introduced to Kenya during the colonial era. The first general election was held in 1920 in the then East Africa Protectorate, with 11 constituencies. Between 1920 and 1956, the number of constituencies rose from 11 to 28. In 1962, prior to independence the following year, the Royal Commission was tasked to create 100 constituencies. The independence Constitution of Kenya provided that for purposes of representation in the House of Representatives, the constituencies should be between 110 and 130. The Royal Commission drew 117 constituencies across the 40 districts and Nairobi region.

The number of constituencies increased from 117 at independence to 290 in 2013. There have been four major constituency delineations since independence: in 1966, 1986, 1996 and 2012. In 1966, the number rose from 117 to 158, to accommodate senators from the abolished Senate of Kenya. At this point the House of Representatives was renamed National Assembly. In 1986, an act of parliament allowed the number of constituencies to be increased from 158 to 188. The constituencies were effected during the 1988 Kenyan general election. In 1996, the number of constituencies was increased from 188 to 210. The number remained the same until the 2010 Constitution of Kenya increased the number of constituencies to 290, which based on a formula where these constituencies were to be delineated based on population numbers.

Each constituency returns one Member of Parliament. The constitution mandates that the Independent Electoral and Boundaries Commission (IEBC) conduct a boundary review at a minimum of eight years and a maximum of twelve years. Since the last boundaries review was conducted in March 2012, by August 2024, long after the 12-year deadline, no review has been conducted. This is attributed to the fact that there is no functioning IEBC, since most of all commissioners either resigned or retired at some point between 2022 and 2023.

== Constituencies by Region (Former Province) ==
Regions, Population and No. of Constituencies
Region	Area (km^{2})	Population (2019)	Number of Constituencies
Coast	83,603	4,329,474	26
North Eastern	126,902	2,490,073	18
Eastern	159,891	6,821,049	44
Central	13,176	5,482,239	34
Rift Valley	173,868	12,752,966	76
Western	8,360	5,021,843	33
Nyanza	16,162	6,269,579	42
Nairobi	684	4,397,073	17
KENYA	582,646	47,564,296	290

== Former Coast Province ==
Former Coast Province

Constituencies and population
County	Population (2019)	Number of seats	Constituencies
Mombasa	1,208,333	6	1. Changamwe; 2. Jomvu; 3. Kisauni; 4. Nyali; 5. Likoni; 6. Mvita
Kwale County	866,820	4	7. Msambweni; 8. Lunga Lunga; 9. Matuga; 10. Kinango
Kilifi County	1,453,787	7	11. Kilifi North; 12. Kilifi South; 13. Kaloleni; 14. Rabai; 15. Ganze; 16. Malindi; 17. Magarini
Tana River County	315,943	3	18. Garsen; 19. Galole; 20. Bura
Lamu County	143,920	2	21. Lamu East; 22. Lamu West
Taita–Taveta County	340,671	4	23. Taveta; 24. Wundanyi; 25. Mwatate; 26. Voi

== Former North Eastern Province ==
Former North Eastern Province

=== Garissa County ===
- Population (2009): 623,060
- Current number of seats: 6
- Constituencies: 27. Garissa Township (formerly Dujis Constituency), 28. Balambala, 29. Lagdera, 30. Dadaab, 31. Fafi, 32. Ijara.

=== Wajir County ===
- Population (2009): 661,941
- Current number of seats: 6
- Constituencies: 33. Wajir North, 34. Wajir East, 35. Tarbaj, 36. Wajir West, 37. Eldas, 38. Wajir South.

=== Mandera County ===
- Population (2009): 1,025,756
- Current number of seats: 6
- Constituencies: 39. Mandera West, 40. Banissa, 41. Mandera North, 42. Mandera South, 43. Mandera East, 44. Lafey.

== Former Eastern Province ==
Former Eastern Province

=== Marsabit County ===
- Population (2009): 291,166
- Current number of seats: 4
- Constituencies: 45. Moyale, 46. North Horr, 47. Saku, 48. Laisamis.

=== Isiolo County ===
- Population (2009): 143,294
- Current number of seats: 2
- Constituencies: 49. Isiolo North, 50. Isiolo South.

=== Meru County ===
- Population (2009): 1,356,301
- Current number of seats: 9
- Constituencies: 51. Igembe South, 52. Igembe Central, 53. Igembe North, 54. Tigania West, 55. Tigania East, 56. North Imenti, 57. Buuri, 58. Central Imenti, 59. South Imenti.

=== Tharaka-Nithi County ===
- Population (2009): 365,330
- Current number of seats: 3
- Constituencies: 60. Maara, 61. Chuka/Igambang'ombe, 62. Tharaka.

=== Embu County ===
- Population (2019): 516,212
- Current number of seats: 4
- Constituencies: 63. Manyatta, 64. Runyenjes, 65. Mbeere South, 66. Mbeere North.

=== Kitui County ===
- Population (2009): 1,012,709
- Current number of seats: 8
- Constituencies: 67. Mwingi North, 68. Mwingi West, 69. Mwingi Central, 70. Kitui West, 71. Kitui Rural, 72. Kitui Central, 73. Kitui East, 74. Kitui South.

=== Machakos County ===
- Population (2009): 1,098,584
- Current number of seats: 8
- Constituencies: 75. Masinga, 76. Yatta, 77. Kangundo, 78. Matungulu, 79. Kathiani, 80. Mavoko, 81. Machakos Town, 82. Mwala.

=== Makueni County ===
- Population (2009): 111,179
- Current number of seats: 6
- Constituencies: 83. Mbooni, 84. Kilome, 85. Kaiti, 86. Makueni, 87. Kibwezi West, 88. Kibwezi East.

== Former Central Province ==
Former Central Province

=== Nyandarua County ===
- Population (2009): 596,268
- Current number of seats: 5
- Constituencies: 89. Kinangop, 90. Kipipiri, 91. Ol Kalou, 92. Ol Jorok, 93. Ndaragwa.

=== Nyeri County ===
- Population (2009): 693,558
- Current number of seats: 6
- Constituencies: 94. Tetu, 95. Kieni, 96. Mathira, 97. Othaya, 98. Mukurweini, 99. Nyeri Town.

=== Kirinyaga County ===
- Population (2009): 528,054
- Current number of seats: 4
- Constituencies: 100. Mwea, 101. Gichugu, 102. Ndia, 103. Kirinyaga Central.

=== Murang'a County ===
- Population (2009): 942,581
- Current number of seats: 7
- Constituencies: 104. Kangema, 105. Mathioya, 106. Kiharu, 107. Kigumo, 108. Maragwa, 109. Kandara, 110. Gatanga.

=== Kiambu County ===
- Population (2009): 1,623,282
- Current number of seats: 12
- Constituencies: 111. Gatundu South, 112. Gatundu North, 113. Juja, 114. Thika Town, 115. Ruiru, 116. Githunguri, 117. Kiambu, 118. Kiambaa, 119. Kabete, 120. Kikuyu, 121. Limuru, 122. Lari.

== Former Rift Valley Province ==
Former Rift Valley Province

=== Turkana County ===
- Population (2009): 855,399
- Current number of seats: 6
- Constituencies: 123. Turkana North, 124. Turkana West, 125. Turkana Central, 126. Loima, 127. Turkana South, 128. Turkana East.

=== West Pokot County ===
- Population (2009): 512,690
- Current number of seats: 4
- Constituencies: 129. Kapenguria, 130. Sigor, 131. Kacheliba, 132. Pokot South.

=== Samburu County ===
- Population (2009): 223,947
- Current number of seats: 3
- Constituencies: 133. Samburu West, 134. Samburu North, 135. Samburu East.

=== Trans-Nzoia County ===
- Population (2009): 818,757
- Current number of seats: 5
- Constituencies: 136. Kwanza, 137. Endebess, 138. Saboti, 139. Kiminini, 140. Cherangany.

=== Uasin Gishu County ===
- Population (2009): 894,179
- Current number of seats: 6
- Constituencies: 141. Soy, 142. Turbo, 143. Moiben, 144. Ainabkoi, 145. Kapseret, 146. Kesses.

=== Elgeyo-Marakwet County ===
- Population (2009): 369,998
- Current number of seats: 4
- Constituencies: 147. Marakwet East, 148. Marakwet West, 149. Keiyo North, 150. Keiyo South.

=== Nandi County ===
- Population (2009): 752,966
- Current number of seats: 6
- Constituencies: 151. Tinderet, 152. Aldai, 153. Nandi Hills, 154. Chesumei, 155. Emgwen, 156. Mosop.

=== Baringo County ===
- Population (2009): 555,561
- Current number of seats: 6
- Constituencies: 157. Tiaty, 158. Baringo North, 159. Baringo Central, 160. Baringo South, 161. Mogotio, 162. Eldama Ravine.

=== Laikipia County ===
- Population (2009): 399,227
- Current number of seats: 3
- Constituencies: 163. Laikipia West, 164. Laikipia East, 165. Laikipia North.

=== Nakuru County ===
- Population (2009): 1,603,325
- Current number of seats: 11
- Constituencies: 166. Molo, 167. Njoro, 168. Naivasha, 169. Gilgil, 170. Kuresoi South, 171. Kuresoi North, 172. Subukia, 173. Rongai, 174. Bahati, 175. Nakuru Town West, 176. Nakuru Town East.

=== Narok County ===
- Population (2009): 850,920
- Current number of seats: 6
- Constituencies: 177. Kilgoris, 178. Emurua Dikirr, 179. Narok North, 180. Narok East, 181. Narok South, 182. Narok West.

=== Kajiado County ===
- Population (2009): 687,312
- Current number of seats: 5
- Constituencies: 183. Kajiado North, 184. Kajiado Central, 185. Kajiado East, 186. Kajiado West, 187. Kajiado South.

=== Kericho County ===
- Population (2009): 758,339
- Current number of seats: 6
- Constituencies: 188. Kipkelion East, 189. Kipkelion West, 190. Ainamoi, 191. Bureti, 192. Belgut, 193. Sigowet–Soin.

=== Bomet County ===
- Population (2009): 545,378
- Current number of seats: 5
- Constituencies: 194. Sotik, 195. Chepalungu, 196. Bomet East, 197. Bomet Central, 198. Konoin.

== Former Western Province ==
Former Western Province

=== Kakamega County ===
- Population (2009): 1,660,768
- Current number of seats: 12
- Constituencies: 199. Lugari, 200. Likuyani, 201. Malava, 202. Lurambi, 203. Navakholo, 204. Mumias West, 205. Mumias East, 206. Matungu, 207. Butere, 208. Khwisero, 209. Shinyalu, 210. Ikolomani.

=== Vihiga County ===
- Population (2009): 554,622
- Current number of seats: 5
- Constituencies: 211. Vihiga, 212. Sabatia, 213. Hamisi, 214. Luanda, 215. Emuhaya.

=== Bungoma County ===
- Population (2009): 1,630,934
- Current number of seats: 9
- Constituencies: 216. Mount Elgon, 217. Sirisia, 218. Kabuchai, 219. Bumula, 220. Kanduyi, 221. Webuye East, 222. Webuye West, 223. Kimilili, 224. Tongaren.

=== Busia County ===
- Population (2009): 488,075
- Current number of seats: 7
- Constituencies: 225. Teso North, 226. Teso South, 227. Nambale, 228. Matayos, 229. Butula, 230. Funyula, 231. Budalangi.

== Former Nyanza Province ==
Former Nyanza Province

=== Siaya County ===
- Population (2009): 842,304
- Current number of seats: 6
- Constituencies: 232. Ugenya, 233. Ugunja, 234. Alego Usonga, 235. Gem, 236. Bondo, 237. Rarieda.

=== Kisumu County ===
- Population (2009): 968,909
- Current number of seats: 7
- Constituencies: 238. Kisumu East, 239. Kisumu West, 240. Kisumu Central, 241. Seme, 242. Nyando, 243. Muhoroni, 244. Nyakach.

=== Homa Bay County ===
- Population (2009): 963,794
- Current number of seats: 8
- Constituencies: 245. Kasipul, 246. Kabondo Kasipul, 247. Karachuonyo, 248. Rangwe, 249. Homa Bay Town, 250. Ndhiwa, 251. Suba North 252. Suba South.

=== Migori County ===
- Population (2009): 1,028,579
- Current number of seats: 8
- Constituencies: 253. Rongo, 254. Awendo, 255. Suna East, 256. Suna West, 257. Uriri, 258. Nyatike, 259. Kuria West, 260. Kuria East.

=== Kisii County ===
- Population (2009): 1,152,282
- Current number of seats: 9
- Constituencies: 261. Bonchari, 262. South Mugirango, 263. Bomachoge Borabu, 264. Bobasi, 265. Bomachoge Chache, 266. Nyaribari Masaba, 267. Nyaribari Chache, 268. Kitutu Chache North, 269. Kitutu Chache South.

=== Nyamira County ===
- Population (2009): 598,252
- Current number of seats: 4
- Constituencies: 270. Kitutu Masaba, 271. West Mugirango, 272. North Mugirango, 273. Borabu.

== Former Nairobi Province ==
Former Nairobi Province

=== Nairobi County ===
- Population (2009): 3,138,369
- Current number of seats: 17

Constituency	Wards (85)
274. Westlands	Kitisuru • Parklands/Highridge • Karura • Kangemi • Mountain View
275. Dagoretti North	Kilimani • Kawangware • Gatina • Kileleshwa • Kabiro
276. Dagoretti South	Mutu-ini • Ngand'o • Riruta • Uthiru/Ruthimitu • Waithaka
277. Lang'ata	Karen • Nairobi West • Mugumo-ini • South C • Nyayo Highrise
278. Kibra	Laini Saba • Lindi • Mákina • Woodley/Kenyatta Golf Course • Sarang'ombe
279. Roysambu	Githurai • Kahawa West • Zimmerman • Roysambu • Kahawa
280. Kasarani	Clay City • Mwiki • Kasarani • Njiru • Ruai
281. Ruaraka	Babadogo • Utalii • Mathare North • Lucky Summer • Korogocho
282. Embakasi South	Imara Daima • Kwa Njenga • Kwa Reuben • Pipeline • Kware
283. Embakasi North	Kariobangi North • Dandora Area I • Dandora Area II • Dandora Area III • Dandora Area IV
284. Embakasi Central	Kayole North • Kayole Central • Kayole South • Komarock • Matopeni/Spring Valley
285. Embakasi East	Upper Savanna • Lower Savanna • Embakasi • Utawala • Mihang'o
286. Embakasi West	Umoja I • Umoja II • Mowlem • Kariobangi South
287. Makadara	Makongeni • Maringo/Hamza • Harambee • Viwandani
288. Kamukunji	Pumwani • Eastleigh North • Eastleigh South • Airbase • California
289. Starehe	Nairobi Central • Ngara • Ziwani/Kariokor • Pangani • Landimawe • Nairobi South
290. Mathare	Hospital • Mabatini • Huruma • Ngei • Mlango Kubwa • Kiamaiko
