= Marurui =

Suburb in the Kasarani area of Nairobi, Kenya

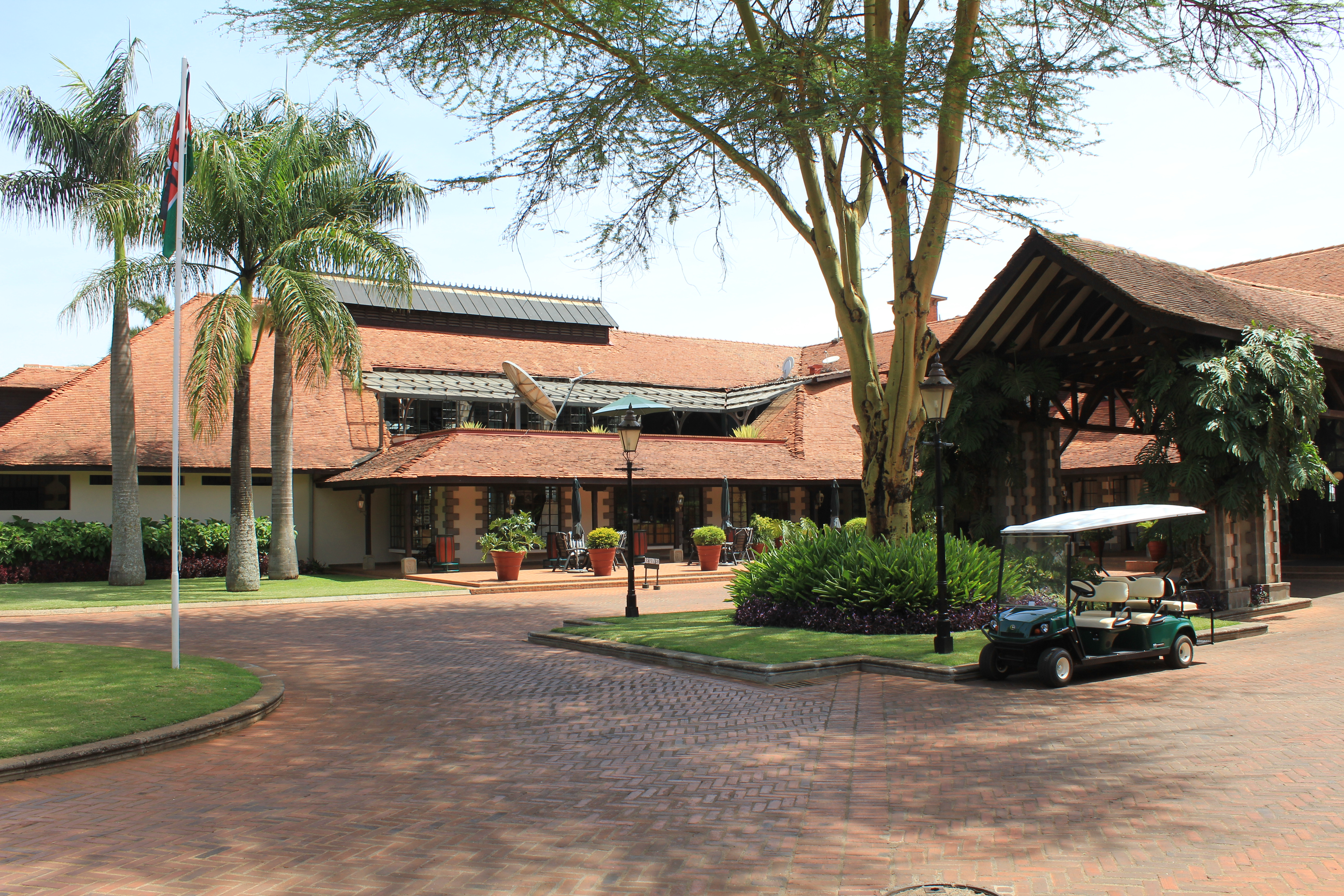
- Windsor Golf and Country Club in Marurui

- Location of Marurui in Kenya
- Coordinates: 1°12′21″S 36°51′44″E
- Country: Kenya
- County: Nairobi City
- Sub-county: Kasarani
- Time zone: UTC+3

Marurui is a neighbourhood in the city of Nairobi. Located in the larger Kasarani area, it is approximately 10 kilometres (6.2 mi) northeast of the central business district of Nairobi.

== Overview ==
The estate is believed to have got its name from a medical plant known as Olmaroroi by the Maasai. The neighbourhood is zoned as a low-density residential suburb with single-family homes. Marurui hosts the high-income, middle-income to some low-income residents. The neighbourhood contains the slum of Gathara (known as Jua Kali by its residents).

The neighbourhood is bordered by Garden Estate, Thome, Roysambu, Kasarani and Mirema.

Roysambu Constituency and Roysambu ward, both electoral divisions, cover the neighbourhood. The constituency encompasses other estates and neighbourhoods such as: Garden Estate, Thome, Ridgeways, Kiwanja, Njathaini, Ngomongo, Kongo Soweto, parts of Kahawa and Githurai, Mirema, Kamiti, and Zimmerman. Both electoral divisions are within the Kasarani Sub-county

As of 2019, Marurui together with Njathaini had a population of 11,522, with 5,920 of them being male and 5,600 being female. The neighbourhood had a population density of 2,769/km^{2} in a land area of 4.2 km.^{2}

== Points of interest ==
1. Starehe Girls' Centre, is located in Marurui.
2. Windsor Golf Club, located in Marurui.
