= Zimmerman, Nairobi =

Suburb in Nairobi, Kenya

Zimmerman
- Location of Zimmerman in Kenya
- Coordinates: 01°12′30″S 36°53′59″E
- Country: Kenya
- County: Nairobi City
- Sub-county: Kasarani

Area
  - Total: 1.9 km^{2} (0.73 sq mi)

Population (2019)
  - Total: 49,533
  - Density: 26,359/km^{2} (68,270/sq mi)

Zimmerman is a mixed-use and residential suburb of the city of Nairobi. Located within the larger Kasarani area, it is approximately 13 kilometres (8 mi) northeast of Nairobi's central business district off Thika Road. The neighbourhood got its name from a German industrialist Karl Fritz Paul Zimmerman. The neighbourhood is high-density, hosting the lower middle income to low income segment of the Nairobi residents.

== Location ==
Zimmerman is located approximately 13 kilometres (8 mi) northeast of Nairobi's central business district, off Thika Road to the west, within the larger sub-county of Kasarani. It is located west of Kasarani; northwest of Roysambu; south of Githurai 44 and east of Mirema.

== Overview ==
Zimmerman traces its origins from a German industrialist Karl Fritz Paul Zimmerman, who was the proprietor of a taxidermy factory known as Zimmerman Limited. The grounds that Zimmerman now sits on were previously used by the taxidermy factory, that was launched in 1929 and closed in 1977, after the Kenyan government banned hunting.

Zimmerman was initially zoned as an industrial zone and residential, with mixed residential development. The neighbourhood has however increasingly gained a large population from residents from other parts of Kenya. It is a high-density, mixed-use residential area, due to its affordability for students and lower middle income to low income families.

Zimmerman ward, an electoral division, borrows its name from the estate. Zimmerman is located within Roysambu Constituency, which encompasses other estates and neighbourhoods such as: Garden Estate, Thome, Ridgeways, Marurui, Kiwanja, Njathaini, Ngomongo, Kongo Soweto, parts of Kahawa and Githurai, Mirema, Kamiti, and Zimmerman. Both electoral divisions are within the Kasarani Sub-county.
