= Lucky Summer =

Suburb of Kasarani in Nairobi, Kenya

- Location of Lucky Summer in Kenya
- Coordinates: 1°14′20″S 36°53′59″E
- Country: Kenya
- County: Nairobi City
- Sub-county: Kasarani

Area
  - Total: 1.7 km^{2} (0.66 sq mi)

Population (2019)
  - Total: 50,865
  - Density: 30,373/km^{2} (78,670/sq mi)

Lucky Summer is a neighborhood in the Kasarani area of Nairobi, Kenya. It is located approximately 11 kilometres (7 mi) northeast of Nairobi's central business district. It is a high-density suburb. It gives its name to the Lucky Summer Ward, an electoral ward with the same name.

== Overview ==
Lucky Summer is one of the neighbourhoods electorally placed in Ruaraka Constituency, within the larger Kasarani Sub-county. It borders Dandora to the south.
