= Ng'ando =

Area of Nairobi, Kenya

- Location of Ng'ando in Kenya
- Coordinates: 1°17′56″S 36°44′43″E
- Country: Kenya
- County: Nairobi City
- Sub-county: Dagoretti
- Time zone: UTC+3

Ng'ando is a neighbourhood in Dagoretti in the city of Nairobi. It is approximately 7.9 kilometres (4.9 mi) northwest of the central business district of Nairobi.

== Overview ==
Ngando is located approximately 7.9 kilometres (4.9 mi) west of Nairobi's central business district. It is straddles the Ngong Road to the north. It borders Riruta to the north and the Ngong Racecourse to the south.

Ngando is predominantly a low-income neighbourhood that forms part of the larger Dagoretti area. Ngando suffers from poor infrastructure characterised by poor waste disposal, open sewers and unpaved roads.

Ngando Ward is also an electoral division within Dagoretti South Constituency. The whole constituency is within Dagoretti Sub-county.
