= Roysambu =

Suburb in the Kasarani area of Nairobi, Kenya

- Location of Roysambu in Kenya
- Coordinates: 01°13′06″S 36°53′11″E
- Country: Kenya
- County: Nairobi City
- Sub-county: Kasarani

Area
  - Total: 11.5 km^{2} (4.4 sq mi)

Population (2019)
  - Total: 54,752
  - Density: 4,758/km^{2} (12,320/sq mi)

Roysambu is a commercial and residential suburb of the city of Nairobi. Located within the larger Kasarani area, it is approximately 11 kilometres (7 mi) northeast of Nairobi's central business district off Thika Road. The neighbourhood is a high-density, hosting the lower middle income to low income segment of the Nairobi residents.

== History ==
A report by the National Lands Commission (NLC) shared before the Kenyan parliament in 2019 indicates that the parcel of land currently known as Roysambu was originally leased to a man of Australian origin called Henry Hebert Tarlton in 1904. Tarlton turned the piece of land into a sort of open air zoo, he had a livestock farm, and game hunting used to take place there from time to time. Collectively, this hunting ground (measuring 4443 acres) was named "The Roysambu Estate".

Henry Tarlton died in 1932 while fishing at a dam in Ruiru in the edges of his massive farm. The land was gradually sub-divided over time and sold to different parties who later developed it into a mixed-use estate typical of the expansive Nairobi urban sprawl.

It kept the name Roysambu a name thought to be of Masai origin. The name is thought to be a corruption of the Masai name "Soit Sambu" or "Soysambu" which means the place of striated rocks. "Sambu" is also a Masai name associated with cattle of a certain color which makes sense since cattle farming actively took place in the parcel of land in the 20th century.

There is no evidence of Roysambu having been a suburb as it was primarily used as a hunting ground and a farm until late in the 1980s when under the KANU regime massive subdivisions started taking place.

== Location ==
Roysambu is located approximately 11 kilometres (7 mi) northeast of Nairobi's central business district, within the larger sub-county of Kasarani. It is located west of Kasarani; northeast of Zimmerman; south of Thome, north and west of Mirema.

== Overview ==
Roysambu was initially zoned as a low-density residential neighbourhood, with single family homes. However, the neighbourhood has increasingly gained a large population, residents from other parts of Kenya. It is a high-density residential area, with low-rise and occasional high-rise flats, due to its affordability for students and lower middle income to low income families.

Roysambu Constituency and Roysambu ward, both electoral divisions, borrow their names from the estate. The constituency encompasses other estates and neighbourhoods such as: Garden Estate, Thome, Ridgeways, Marurui, Kiwanja, Njathaini, Ngomongo, Kongo Soweto, parts of Kahawa and Githurai, Mirema, Kamiti, and Zimmerman. Both electoral divisions are within the Kasarani Sub-county

== Points of interest ==
1. The United States International University Africa (USIU), a higher learning private institution near Roysambu.
2. Thika Road Mall (TRM), a shopping mall in Roysambu, along TRM Drive off Thika Road.
3. The Moi International Sports Centre, in Kasarani.
