= Thome, Nairobi =

Thome
- Residential neighbourhood
- Location of Thome in Kenya
- Coordinates: 1°13′13″S 36°52′23″E
- Country: Kenya
- County: Nairobi City
- Sub-county: Kasarani
- Time zone: UTC+3

Thome is a residential neighbourhood in the city of Nairobi. Located with the larger Kasarani area, it is approximately 9.6 kilometres (6.0 mi) northeast of the central business district of Nairobi.

== Overview ==
The land that Thome estate sits on was initially a coffee estate until the 1970s when the Kenyan government seized it and divided it for absolute sale. In 1913 Jacob Hirschfeld, an Israeli settler pitched camp in British East Africa. He acquired the expansive land that covered the whole of present-day whole of GSU headquarters, Thome Estate, USIU, Garden Estate, National Youth Service headquarters, part of modern-day Ruaraka and touched on the land adjoining Windsor Golf Club. The neighbourhood is zoned as a low-density residential suburb with single-family homes. The 1990s saw an upsurge in crime that made residents weary and some moved to safer neighbourhoods.

The neighbourhood is bordered by Garden Estate, Marurui, Roysambu, Kasarani and Mirema.

== Points of interest ==
1. The United States International University Africa (USIU), a higher learning private institution in Thome.
