= Riruta Satellite =

Settlement in Nairobi, Kenya

Riruta
- Location of Riruta in Kenya
- Coordinates: 1°17′4″S 36°44′1″E
- Country: Kenya
- County: Nairobi City
- Sub-county: Dagoretti
- Time zone: UTC+3

Riruta, also known as Riruta Satellite, is a settlement in the Dagoretti area of Nairobi. It is approximately 9.4 kilometres (5.8 mi) west of the central business district of Nairobi.

PC Kinyanjui Technical Training Institute, a public, technical institute is located in Riruta.

Riruta Ward is also an electoral division within Dagoretti South Constituency. The whole constituency is within Dagoretti Sub-county.

== See also ==
- Dagoretti North Constituency
- Karen, Kenya
- Waithaka
