= Mwiki =

Neighbourhood in Kiambu and Nairobi counties, Kenya

- Location of Mwiki in Kenya
- Coordinates: 1°13′25″S 36°55′52″E
- Country: Kenya
- County: Nairobi City and Kiambu
- Sub-county: Kasarani and Githurai

Mwiki is a neighbourhood that is growing rapidly in the counties of Nairobi and Kiambu. It is approximately 14 kilometres (8.7 mi) northeast of the central business district of Nairobi. Due to its transregional nature, the part of Mwiki that is within Nairobi is referred as Kasarani Mwiki while the other portion domiciled in Kiambu is referred as Githurai Mwiki.

The two Mwiki regions are separated by the Gatharaini River (Kasarani River) as it flows downstream in an easterly direction to join the Nairobi River.

== Location ==
Mwiki is located approximately 14 kilometres (8.7 mi) northeast of Nairobi's central business district. Kasarani Mwiki is straddled by the Kasarani-Mwiki Road, off Thika Road. Githurai-Mwiki is considered part of the larger Githurai 45 area. Electorally, Mwiki is placed under two constituencies: with Githurai Mwiki being under Ruiru, while Kasarani Mwiki under Kasarani. Mwiki also falls into two administrative areas of Nairobi and Kiambu: Kasarani Mwiki in Nairobi's Kasarani Sub-county, while Githurai Mwiki is administratively managed by the Kiambu's Githurai Sub-county.

== Overview ==
Mwiki is popularly known in two ways, depending on location: Githurai Mwiki and Kasarani Mwiki. Githurai Mwiki is generally a high-density housing and low-income neighbourhood with closely built structures. Residents especially in Githurai Mwiki struggle with limited or poor infrastructure such as schools, due to the growing population. This led to the government to split Ruiru Sub-county (Note: Ruiru Sub-county shared common boundaries with Ruiru Constituency) into two: Ruiru and Githurai sub-counties. Mwiki in general has struggled with poor roads, that deem the area inaccessible.

Mwiki has in the past also struggled with insecurity. After Uhuru's reign, a large population admitted to the fact that it is a safe space for the occupants after introduction of Mwiki Police Station sect.

== Mwiki wards ==
Mwiki produces two electoral wards with the same name in the counties of Kiambu and Nairobi City: Mwiki Ward in Kiambu is one of the wards in Ruiru Constituency, while Mwiki Ward in Nairobi is one of the five electoral wards within Kasarani Constituency.
