= Killing of Rachel Wandeto =

2026 crime in Nairobi, Kenya

- Location: Mwiki, Kasarani, Nairobi, Kenya
- Date: 16 May 2026

On 16 May 2026, Kenyan gospel musician Rachel Muthoni Wandeto was attacked and set on fire in Nairobi. She died of her injuries two days later, on 18 May 2026, while receiving treatment at Kenyatta National Hospital.

== Attack, treatment, and death ==
On 16 May 2026, three masked men allegedly ambushed Wandeto around 11th Street near Obama Road in Mwiki, Kasarani while she was on her way home. The unidentified men accused Wandeto of receiving money from President William Ruto, whom she had previously composed music endorsing her support for. The attackers allegedly demanded money from her. Upon informing the attackers that she had no money, they dragged her to a secluded area and started physically assaulting her. They then doused her with a flammable liquid suspected to be petrol and set her on fire before fleeing the scene.

Bystanders brought Wandeto to Uhai Neema Hospital in Mwiki for urgent medical intervention. Due to the nature of the injuries, she was referred to Kenyatta National Hospital for further treatment. Wandeto died on 18 May 2026 while receiving treatment at Kenyatta National Hospital. An autopsy report conducted by the government pathologist Johansen Oduor at the hospital concluded an 85% body surface burns that led to organ failure.

== Investigation ==
The Directorate of Public prosecution (DPP) launched a manhunt for the suspect that led to the arrest of Josiah Njeru Njiru. The suspect was detained at the Makadara law courts and the detectives sought more time for further interrogation. The court granted the homicide unit a 10-day detention order to proceed with the investigation. The suspect, Josiah Njeru was identified as a taxi driver who frequently ferried Rachel, with suspicion that the attack could have probably been linked with possible financial extortion motives. The interior cabinet secretary and the inspector general of police visited Rachel at the KNH and condemned the attack. They promised that the perpetrators would face full legal consequences.

President William Ruto also condemned the attack and demanded that the perpetrators be found. He warned of dangerous divisive ethnic politics and stated that his administration would not allow intimidation based on individual political beliefs. He further proceeded to support the family with 1.6 million Kenya shillings to facilitate funeral preparations.

== Burial ==
Wandeto's burial was scheduled for 28 May 2026, though it did not take place after her husband stopped the event through a court order. There was a standoff at the Montezuma Funeral Home where family and relatives had gathered to collect her body when the facility did not release it due to a missing permit on claims that Peter Njaramba, Rachel’s husband had disappeared with it. Allegedly, the dispute arose as Wandeto's husband sought to bury her at his home in Murang’a while her family claimed that he had not yet paid traditional dowry, thus they could not recognize him as her husband based on the Kikuyu traditions.

The High Court in Kerugoya granted Wandeto's mother permission to proceed with the burial, dismissing Wandeto's husbands' petition.
