= Dagoretti Constituency =

Dagoretti
- Former constituency for the Parliament of Kenya
- District: Nairobi
- Area: 39km^{2}

Former constituency
- Created: 1963
- Abolished: 2013
- Replaced by: Dagoretti North & Dagoretti South

Dagoretti Constituency was an electoral constituency in Kenya. It is one of eight constituencies of Nairobi. It was located to the west of Nairobi. It consisted of the western suburbs of Nairobi. Dagoretti constituency had common boundaries with Dagoretti Division of Nairobi. The entire constituency was located within Nairobi City Council area. The constituency had an area of 39 km^{2}. The constituency boundaries were altered prior to the 1997 elections to include Kenyatta/Golf Course ward from Lang'ata, and moved Kangemi to Westlands. The constituency was partly formed from what was Nairobi West Constituency from 1963 to 1969.

Before the general election of 2013, Dagoretti Constituency was divided, with the bulk of the western and southern parts forming Dagoretti South Constituency; the south-east stretch combined with part of Lang'ata Constituency to form Kibra Constituency; the rest was combined with part of Westlands Constituency to form Dagoretti North Constituency.

== Members of Parliament ==
Elections	MP	Party	Notes
1963	Njoroge Mungai	KANU	
1969	Njoroge Mungai	KANU	One-party system
1974	Johnstone Muthiora	KANU	Muthiora died soon after elections, necessitating a by-election.
1975	Francis Kahende	KANU	By-Election, One-party system
1979	Njoroge Mungai	KANU	One-party system
1983	Clement Gachanja	KANU	One-party system
1988	Chris Kamuyu	KANU	One-party system
1992	Chris Kamuyu	FORD-Asili	
1997	Beth Wambui Mugo	SDP	
2002	Beth Wambui Mugo	NARC	
2007	Beth Wambui Mugo	Party of National Unity	
Dagoretti dissolved into Dagoretti North, Dagoretti South, and Kibra

== Locations and wards ==
Locations
Location	Population*
Kawangware	86,824
Kenyatta/Golf course	30,253
Mutuini	14,521
Riruta	65,958
Uthiru/Ruthimitu	23,016
Waithaka	19,937
Total	240,081
1999 census.

Wards
Ward	Registered Voters
Kawangware	22,662
Kenyatta/Golf course	24,948
Mutuini	6,344
Riruta	20,329
Uthiru/Ruthimitu	8,120
Waithaka	6,952
Total	89,355
*September 2005.
