= Mathare Constituency =

Mathare Constituency can mean

- Kasarani Constituency, a constituency in Kenya which was known as Mathare Constituency between 1974 and 1994, before being renamed.
- Mathare Constituency (2013), a newer constituency which was part of Starehe Constituency prior to 2013.
