= Nyayo Highrise =

Residential neighbourhood in Nairobi, Kenya

Highrise
- Location of Highrise in Kenya
- Coordinates: 1°18′56″S 36°48′20″E
- Country: Kenya
- County: Nairobi City
- Sub-county: Lang'ata
- Development begun: 1984
- Time zone: UTC+3

Nyayo Highrise is a residential neighbourhood in the city of Nairobi. It is approximately 3.5 kilometres (2.2 mi) southwest of the central business district of Nairobi. Initially a slum upgrading project, the estate was built in an effort by the national government to provide its citizens with affordable housing.

== Location ==
Nyayo Highrise is located approximately 3.5 kilometres (2.2 mi) southwest of Nairobi's central business district. It borders the Nairobi Dam and the Kibera slums.

== Overview ==
Highrise was developed in the 1980s as a slum upgrading project by the national government through the National Housing Corporation (NHC). It was the first slum upgrading project in Kenya, even though the intended Kibera residents never occupied them. The project was meant to house residents of the neighbouring expansive Kibera slums in an effort to improve the livelihoods of the slum dwellers in more livable housing units.

The estate was built by an Indian construction company from 1984, mainly one or two bedroom housing units. Highrise is divided into nine zones: from zones A to J, which have are further divided to blocks. The total number of blocks is fifty, housing over 10,000 tenants.

After completion, the NHC put up the housing units for sale but they were anything but affordable for the intended buyers: the Kibera slum residents. The corporation was forced to sale the housing units to more financially stable individuals, who either resided in them or rented them out.

Highrise has over the years degraded due to poor renovations or lack of thereof. Water shortage is a common denominator among other forms of poor service delivery to Highrise residents, albeit the Nairobi Dam is within the vicinity of the estate. Seefar Apartments, by a private developer, was put up next to the Nairobi Dam within the estate.

Highrise is also an electoral division within Langata Constituency within Nairobi. The neighbourhood together with the informal settlement of Soweto in Kibera have a population of 20,767 and a population density of 44,284/km^{2} in an area of 0.5km^{2}.

== Points of interest ==
1. Riara University, a private higher learning institution off Raila Odinga Way (formally Mbagathi Way).
