= Nairobi West =

Area of Nairobi, Kenya

- Location of Nairobi West in Kenya
- Coordinates: 1°18′38″S 36°49′9″E
- Country: Kenya
- County: Nairobi City
- Sub-county: Lang'ata
- Time zone: UTC+3

Nairobi West is a neighbourhood in the city of Nairobi. It is approximately 2.7 kilometres (1.7 mi) southwest of the central business district of Nairobi.

== Overview ==
Nairobi West is located approximately 2.8 kilometres (1.7 mi) southwest of Nairobi's central business district. It straddles the Lang'ata Road, Mombasa Road and Uhuru Highway junction. It borders the South C estate to the south.

Nairobi West is zoned as a high density residential neighbourhood, with mixed residential developments such as bungalows, flats, and maisonettes. Over the years, it has morphed into a commercial and residential neighbourhood due to the number of nightclubs and bars irregularly opened in the area. The neighborhood is home to the middle class segment of Nairobi residents.

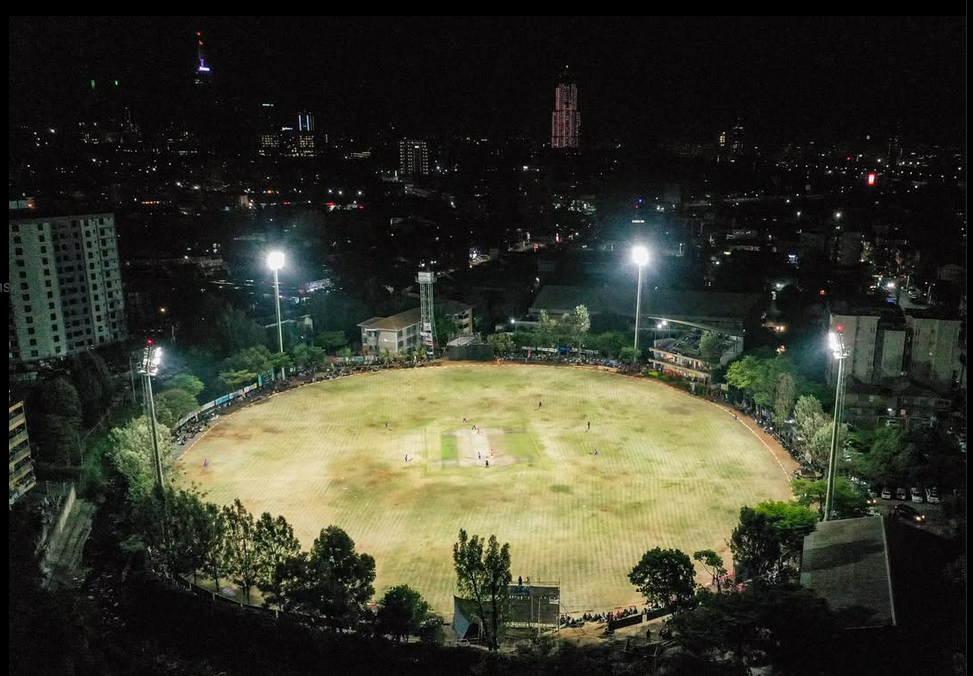
Shree Cutchi Leava Patel Samaj cricket ground in Nairobi West

There is an international school in Nairobi West called Shree Cutchi Leva Patel Samaj School, which has around 3200 students. It also contains a type 5 hospital, the Nairobi West Hospital.

== Points of interest ==
- Nyayo National Stadium, a multipurpose stadium built in 1983 for a capacity of 30,000
- Shree Cutchi Leva Patel Samaj School, an international school located in Nairobi West
- Shree Cutchi Leva Patel Samaj cricket ground, which hosts regular cricket tournaments
