= Waithaka =

Suburb of Nairobi, Kenya

- Location of Waithaka in Kenya
- Coordinates: 1°16′56″S 36°42′57″E
- Country: Kenya
- County: Nairobi City
- Sub-county: Dagoretti
- Time zone: UTC+3

Waithaka is a settlement in Nairobi. Located within the Dagoretti area, it is approximately 11 km (7 mi) west of Nairobi central business district. It borders near Mutuini.

Waithaka Ward is also an electoral division within Dagoretti South Constituency. The whole constituency is within Dagoretti Sub-county.
