= James Mwangi Gakuya =

Kenyan politician

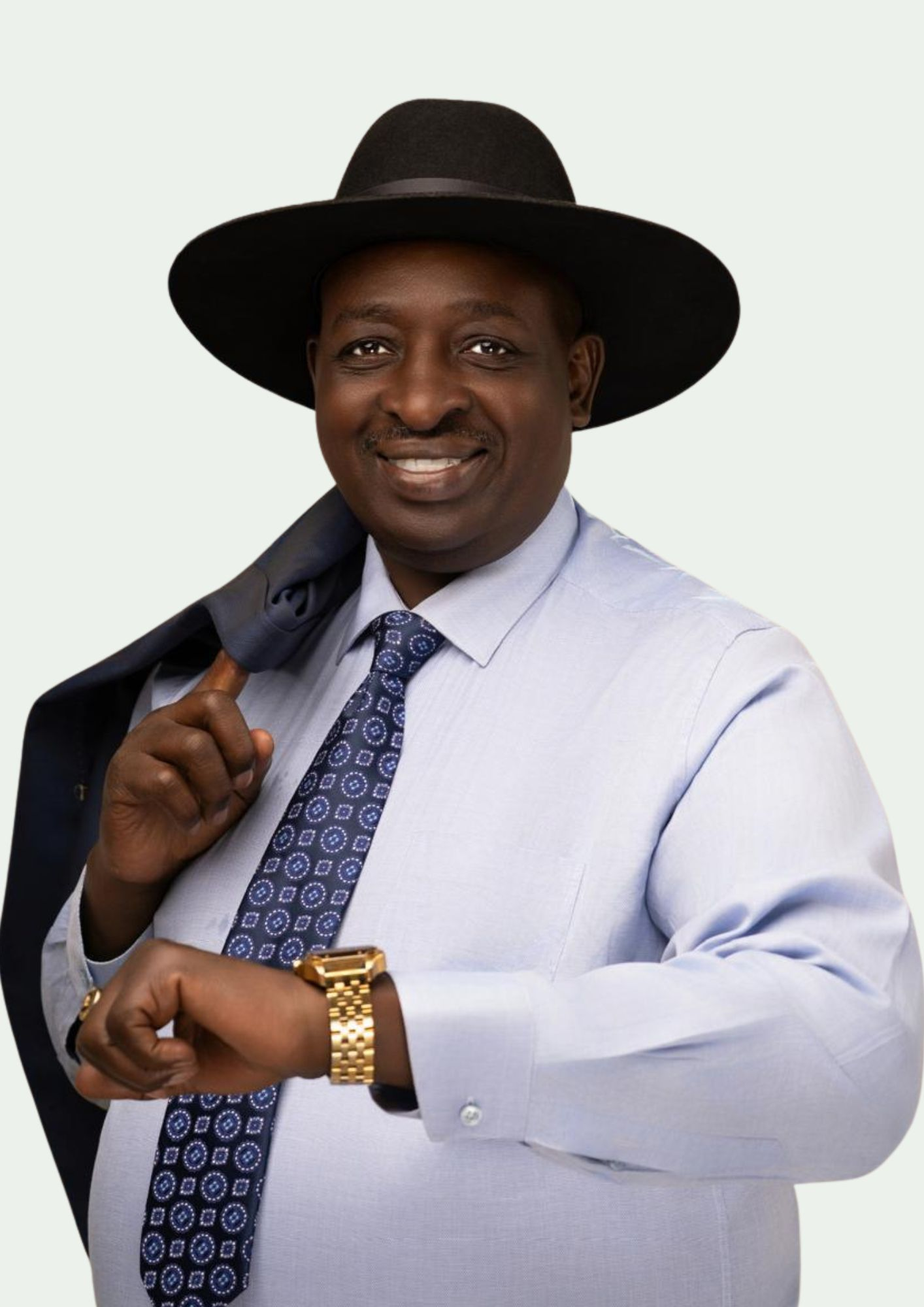
- Hon. James Mwangi Gakuya

Member of Parliament for Embakasi North
- Incumbent
- Assumed office 2013
- Preceded by: Constituency established

Personal details
- Born: December 24, 1967 (age 58) Kenya
- Education: Kenya Methodist University
- Occupation: Politician

James Mwangi Gakuya (born 24 December 1967) is a Kenyan politician serving as the Member of Parliament for Embakasi North Constituency in Nairobi County. He was first elected in the 2013 Kenyan general election and has been re-elected in subsequent elections.

== Early life and education ==
Gakuya attended Makomboki Primary School and later Shaurimoyo Secondary School. He subsequently studied at Kenya Methodist University, where he obtained a Bachelor's degree in Business Administration.

== Career ==
Before entering politics, Gakuya worked in both public and private sector institutions, including Nairobi City Water and Sewerage Company and Makomboki Tea Factory.

== Political career ==
=== Local government ===
Gakuya began his political career in 2002 when he was elected as a councillor for Muthurwa Ward in the former Nairobi City Council. He served in that role until 2013.

=== Member of Parliament ===
In 2013, Gakuya was elected as Member of Parliament for Embakasi North Constituency, a constituency created following the reorganisation of electoral boundaries.

He has since been re-elected in subsequent general elections.

=== Parliamentary roles ===
In the National Assembly of Kenya, Gakuya has served on various committees, including those dealing with trade, health, and regional integration.

== Constituency ==
Embakasi North Constituency is one of the constituencies in Nairobi County. It includes areas such as Kariobangi North and Dandora.

== Personal life ==
Gakuya maintains a relatively private personal life. Publicly available information about his family and personal affairs is limited.

== See also ==
- Embakasi North Constituency
- National Assembly of Kenya
