= Makau =

Makau is a given name and surname of Kenyan origin. Notable people with the name include:

- Makau W. Mutua (born 1958), Kenyan-American professor of law
- Patrick Makau (politician), Kenyan politician
- Patrick Makau Musyoki (born 1985), Kenyan long-distance runner and marathon world record holder
