= Mutuini =

Mutu-ini
- Location of Mutuini in Kenya
- Coordinates: 1°17′17″S 36°41′51″E
- Country: Kenya
- County: Nairobi City
- Sub-county: Dagoretti
- Time zone: UTC+3

Mutu-ini is a neighbourhood in Dagoretti in the city of Nairobi. It is approximately 13 kilometres (8.1 mi) west of the central business district of Nairobi.

== Location ==
Mutuini is located approximately 13 kilometres (8.1 mi) west of Nairobi's central business district. It contains the Kirigu, Gatiba neighbourhoods and borders Lenana.

== Overview ==
Mutuini is predominantly a mixture of the lower middle class neighbourhood and the low-income segment is also present. It forms part of the larger Dagoretti area. Like other neighborhoods in Dagoretti area, Mutuini is characterised by poor infrastructure accentuated by poor waste disposal, open sewers and unpaved roads, especially in the informal settlement areas.

Mutuini Ward is also an electoral division within Dagoretti South Constituency. The whole constituency is within Dagoretti Sub-county.
