= Mathare Constituency (2013) =

Constituency in Nairobi County, Kenya

Mathare
- constituency for the Parliament of Kenya
- Mathare Constituency within Nairobi City County

- Nairobi City County within Kenya
- County: Nairobi City
- Area: 3 km^{2} (1.2 sq mi)

Current constituency
- Created: 2013
- Number of members: One
- Party: ODM
- Member of Parliament: Anthony Oluoch
- Created from: Starehe

Mathare is a constituency in Nairobi. It is one of seventeen constituencies in Nairobi City County. It was created prior to the 2013 general election, when Starehe Constituency boundaries were revised. It is the smallest constituency in Nairobi with an area of 3.00 km^{2} (1.2 sq mi). It borders Ruaraka Constituency to the north; Roysambu and Westlands constituencies to the northwest; Embakasi Central Constituency to the east; Kamukunji Constituency to the south; and Starehe Constituency to the west.

It has six electoral wards namely; Hospital, Mabatini, Huruma, Ngei, Mlango Kubwa, and Kiamaiko.

== Mathare Sub-county ==
The Sub-county shares the same boundaries with the constituency. The sub-county is headquartered in Mathare along Juja Road, headed by a Deputy County Commissioner, working under the Ministry of Interior.
