= Beth Wambui Mugo =

Kenyan politician

Senator Beth Wambūi Mūgo
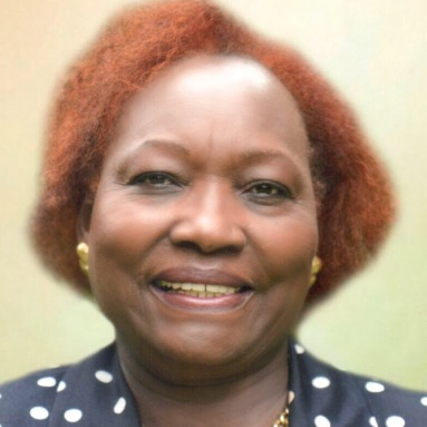

Nominated Senator
- Incumbent
- Assumed office 31 August 2017

Nominated Senator
- In office 21 March 2013 – 16 July 2017

Member of Parliament for Dagoretti
- In office 2007–2013

Assistant Minister for Public Health and Sanitation

Assistant Minister for Education
- In office 2006–2007

Assistant Minister for Tourism
- In office January 2003 – July 2003

Personal details
- Born: 11 July 1939 (age 86) Kiambu District, Kenya
- Party: Jubilee Party of Kenya (since 2017)
- Other political affiliations: Party of National Unity (formerly)
- Occupation: Politician
- Known for: Cancer advocacy

Beth Wambūi Mūgo (born 11 July 1939 in Kiambu district) is a Kenyan politician. She belongs to Party of National Unity and was elected to represent the Dagoretti Constituency in the National Assembly of Kenya in the 2007 parliamentary election.

== Political career ==
Beth Mūgo has had a successful career in politics. She was a nominated member of the Senate between 21 March 2013 → 16 July 2017. She was also a member of parliament for Dagoretti for The Party of National Unity. She was the Assistant Minister of Education (Cabinet) between 2006 and 2007. Between January and July 2003 she was the Asst. Minister for Tourism.

Currently, she is a nominated Senator. She began her work on 31 August 2017. Beth Mūgo is also a member of the Jubilee Party as of January 2017. Lastly, she is a coalition member of Jubilee Alliance.

== Other works ==
She is the founder and a Trustee of The Beth Mūgo Cancer Foundation. Senator Beth Mūgo has extensive personal and professional experience with matters relating to cancer. During her appointment as Kenyan Minister for Public Health and Sanitation, Senator Mūgo spearheaded the development of the National Cancer Control Strategy (2011-2016), the enactment of the Cancer Prevention and Control Act (2012), and the establishment of the National Cancer Institute of Kenya. She also expanded her fight against cancer across the continent when she served as Chairperson of the African Parliamentarians and Health Ministers against Breast, Cervical and Prostate Cancer (2012-2014).
