= Mercy Gakuya =

Kenyan politician

The Honourable Mercy Gakuya

Member of Parliament for Kasarani Constituency
- In office 31 August 2017 – 8 September 2022
- Preceded by: John Njoroge Chege
- Succeeded by: Ronald Karauri
- Constituency: Kasarani Constituency

Personal details
- Born: Mercy Wanjiru Gakuya; 18 June 1979 (age 47) Buuri Constituency, Meru, Kenya
- Citizenship: Kenya
- Party: Jubilee Party
- Parent: Washington Kamaku Mwangi
- Education: University of Nairobi
- Occupation: Politician
- Profession: Lecturer
- Nickname: Mama Miradi

Mercy Wanjiru Gakuya (born 18 June 1979), also known as Mama Miradi, is a Kenyan politician. She is a member of the Jubilee Party and was the Member of Parliament for Kasarani Constituency in the 12th Parliament of Kenya.

== Early life and education ==
Gakuya was born on June 18, 1979, to Washington Kamaku Mwangi in Buuri Constituency in Meru County and was brought up in Nairobi County. She attended Gaitheri Primary School from 1991 to 1995 and Gitugi Girls Secondary School from 1995 to 1998, both in Murang'a for her primary and secondary education. She furthered her education at the University of Nairobi from the year 2000 where she acquired a bachelor of science in chemistry and zoology after completion in 2004 and a master of science in medical physiology from 2005 to 2009.

== Career ==
Gakuya worked as a lecturer at Kenyatta University and Mount Kenya University from 2010 to 2012.

== Political career ==
On August 8, 2017, she was elected a member of parliament for Kasarani Constituency under the Jubilee party ticket. During her period in the National Assembly, she was a member of both the Broadcasting & Library Committee and the Departmental Committee on Health at the National Assembly.

== Personal life ==
She is the daughter of Washington Kamaku Mwangi.

== See also ==
- 12th Parliament of Kenya
- Kasarani Constituency
- Jubilee Party
- 2017 Kenyan general elections
