= Olum =

Olum is a surname. Notable people with the surname include:

- Dick Olum (born 1970), Ugandan major general
- Lawrence Olum (born 1984), Kenyan footballer
- Paul Olum (1918–2001), American mathematician, professor, and university administrator
- Joash Olum, Kenyan politician
- Ailill Aulom, 3rd-century Irish king
