= Kahawa =

Mixed-use settlement in Kenya

Coordinates: 1°11′S 36°56′E

Kahawa is a mixed-use settlement spanning the Kiambu and Nairobi county borders along Thika Road. It is electorally divided into four wards across the two counties: Kahawa and Kahawa West wards in Nairobi County and Kahawa Wendani and Kahawa Sukari wards in Kiambu County. Despite its proximity to the city, half of it is administratively in Ruiru, while some parts, such as Kenyatta University, Kahawa Barracks, Kiwanja and Githurai 44, are administratively in Kasarani.

== The Kahawa region ==
Originally a coffee-growing region, the Kahawa region is generally subdivided into four electoral wards as follows:

A Breakdown of the Kahawa region
Ward	Comprises	Constituency	Sub-county	County
Kahawa	Kongo Soweto, Kamuthi, and parts of Githurai 44, Jacaranda Apartments, Maziwa Settlement	Roysambu	Kasarani	Nairobi
Kahawa Sukari	Peponi School, Brookside Dairy Limited, Kahawa Sukari Location, parts of Northlands	Ruiru	Ruiru	Kiambu
Kahawa Wendani	Home to Maguna's Wendani (formerly Nakumatt), and the entire Kahawa Wendani Sub-Location	Ruiru	Ruiru	Kiambu
Kahawa West	Kahawa West Market, Kenyatta University, Kenyatta University Hospital (KUTRRH), KM, Kiwanja, Kamae Settlement, & Kamiti Prison	Roysambu	Kasarani	Nairobi

== Kahawa Barracks ==
The Kahawa Barracks area, which partly forms the border with Nairobi County, was the site of a British Army base before Kenya's independence. It currently hosts the Kahawa Army Base of the Kenyan Army.

== Transport ==
Kahawa lies to the north of Githurai, another inter-county suburb and settlement along the Kenya-Uganda Railway. Since 2016, the town has been served by suburban trains operated by the Nairobi rail service.

== See also ==
- Ruiru
- Githurai
- Kasarani
- Dandora
- Ongata Rongai
