= Phelix Odiwuor =

Member of Parliament from Lang'ata Constituency

Honourabe Phelix Khodhe

Member of Parliament for Langata Constituency
- Incumbent
- Assumed office 8 September 2022
- Preceded by: Nixon Korir
- Constituency: Langata Constituency

Personal details
- Born: Phelix Odiwuor Kodhe; 27 April 1983 (age 43) Homa Bay, Kenya
- Party: Orange Democratic Movement
- Education: Bachelor of Arts in Community Development
- Alma mater: Daystar University
- Occupation: Politician
- Profession: Newsreader; anchorman; presenter; actor; master of ceremonies
- Nickname: Jalang'o or Jalas

Phelix Odiwuor Khodhe, more popularly known as Jalang'o / Jalas or Lang’ata 1 is a Kenyan politician and Current member of parliament for Langata Constituency which he won on an Orange Democratic Movement (ODM) Party ticket against his predecessor Hon. Nixon Kiprotich Korir. Prior to his political ambitions, Jalas was also a radio presenter, comedian, actor, master of ceremonies (MC), talk show host and philanthropist celebrity in Kenya.

== Early life and education ==
Jalas was born on April 27, 1983, in Homa Bay town, rural Kenya. For his early education, he attended Homabay Lake Primary School in Homa Bay County and Nyang'oma Boys Secondary School in Siaya County. He later joined Daystar University, where he graduated on 13 November 2020 with a Bachelor of Arts in Community Development degree.

== Career ==
=== Media ===
Odiwuor appeared as Jalang'o in Citizen TV's Papa Shirandula, and that's how he earned this stage name, later shortened to 'Jalas'.

He began his career as a radio presenter in 2004, where he worked alongside veteran media personality Caroline Mutoko. He then transitioned to Radio Maisha in 2012, after which he later moved on to Hot 96 FM in 2017 to 2018, when he moved to Radio Milele. In July 2020, Odiwuor went back to where he began his radio career as a morning presenter at Kiss 100 where he was a co-host to Kamene Goro. He also started his own company, Arena Media, which does advertising and marketing. He also does brand ambassador jobs for various corporate brands.

Odiwuor has a YouTube channel, Jalang'o TV, where he interviews personalities from various walks of life.

=== Politics ===
As a candidate for the Orange Democratic Movement (ODM), he was elected MP for Langata Constituency in the 2022 Kenyan general election after defeating his opponent Hon. Nixon Kiprotich Korir.

== Controversy ==
In August 2021, the Daily Nation and The Standard reported Odiwuor as implicated in being a member of a Nairobi-based criminal syndicate involved in a variety of advance-fee scams including Black money scams, sometimes even drug trafficking, armed robbery, contract killings, and enforced kidnappings in Kenya. According to the articles, Odiwuor is involved in money laundering of ill-gotten wealth through legitimate businesses that then receive criminal proceeds as part of sales of the legitimate business and consequently deposit them into bank accounts of the legitimate business. He was accused, among other members of the gang, of being a silent partner in the numerous scams by using publicity and his day job as a decoy of the criminal activities of the gang. According to the articles, the gang engages in violent confrontations, contract killings, mysterious deaths, and enforced kidnappings in subsequent cover-up activities.
