= Simba Arati =

Kenyan politician (born 1981)

The Honourable Simba Arati

2nd Governor of Kisii County
- Incumbent
- Assumed office 25 August 2022
- Deputy: Joash Maangi
- Preceded by: James Ongwae

Member of Parliament for Dagoretti North Constituency
- In office August 2013 – August 2022
- Succeeded by: Beatrice Elachi
- Parliamentary group: Orange Democratic Movement
- Constituency: Dagoretti North

Personal details
- Born: Paul Simba Arati; 28 November 1981 (age 44) Kisii County, Kenya
- Citizenship: Kenya
- Party: Orange Democratic Movement
- Spouse: Mei Arati
- Education: Jaramogi Oginga Odinga University of Science and Technology, Bachelor of Arts in International Relations and Diplomacy; Master of Business Administration (MBA)
- Occupation: Politician

Paul Simba Arati (born 28 November 1981) is a Kenyan politician and the current governor of Kisii County. He was elected during the 2022 Kenyan general elections on the Orange Democratic Movement party ticket. He also previously served as the member of parliament for Dagoretti North Constituency in the 12th Parliament of Kenya. Before getting into politics, he was a public servant working at the Nairobi City Council from 2008 to 2012.

== Early life and education ==
Arati was born on 28 November 1981 in Kisii County. His primary school education was in between schools in Kisii and Bura, Tana River. He started high school in 1995 at Nyamache Secondary School in Bobasi Constituency before he got expelled. After his expulsion, he joined Suneka Secondary School in Bonchari Constituency to complete his Kenya Certificate for Secondary Education in 1999.

In 2001, Arati joined the Kenya Polytechnic to study for a Diploma in Tourism Management, completing it in 2003. For his bachelor's. He joined the International University of Business Management in Guangzhou, China, for business management from 2004 to 2006. He has also attained a degree in international relations and diplomacy from Jaramogi Oginga Odinga University of Science and Technology from 2014 to 2016. He enrolled fro a master's in business administration from the same university in 2016 and completed it in 2022.

== Career ==
His career began as a vegetable vendor hawking around his estate. During the period from 2004 to 2007, he served as the managing director of Aipa Safari Limited.

=== Political career ===
Arati began his political journey as a Nairobi City Councillor. He then joined parliament after being elected the Dagoretti North member of parliament under the Orange Democratic Movement party ticket. Arati won with 50,598 votes against Jubilee's party, Beatrice Elachi, Amos Bernard of the Amani National Congress and Lukalo Caroline of the Federal Party of Kenya. During his time in the 12th parliament of Kenya, he was a committee member of the Departmental Committee on Agriculture, Livestock and Cooperatives while also serving as a member of the committee of Delegate Legislations.

In the 2022 Kenyan general election, Simba Arati contested in the Kisii gubernatorial race under his party, Orange Democratic Movement. He vied against United Democratic Alliance's Ezekiel Mochogu, Chris Obure and Manson Nyamwea, all on an independent ticket. Arati went to win the elections with 270,928 votes.

== Controversies ==
=== Physical altercation ===
The Bahati member of parliament, Ngujiri Kimani, had an altercation with Simba Arati that turned physical during a parliamentary debate in 2015. The fight was over disagreement in opinions about the amendments on the security laws bill in the parliamentary chambers, leading to Mr Arati being hospitalised.

=== Funeral Clash ===
On 1 February 2021, a fight broke out during the funeral service of the Kisii Deputy Governor Joash Maangi's father when the South Mugirango member of parliament, Silvanus Osoro, interrupted the meeting with a group of youth, prompting a fight between him and Simba Arati. The governor was giving a speech and made remarks about the then vice president William Ruto, which triggered Osoro onto the podium to try and grab the microphone from Arati, leading to the scuffle of about twenty minutes.

== Personal life ==
Arati is married to Mei Arati.
