= Moi High School – Kabarak =

Coordinates: 0°10′16″S 35°57′43″E

Moi High School - Kabarak
- Located 21 km from Milimani Residential Area , in Kenya's Rift Valley Province along the Nakuru – Eldama Ravine road Nakuru City, Nakuru County, Rift Valley Province, 20157; Kenya

Information
- Other names: MHSK
- School type: Private High School
- Motto: On Earth, We Rise
- Religious affiliation: Christian
- Founded: 1979
- Founder: His Excellency the Late Hon. Daniel T. Arap Moi
- Area trustee: Hon. Raymond Kipruto Moi
- Chairperson: Hon. Gideon Kipsielei Moi
- Director: Prof. Henry K. Kiplangat, Ph.D, MBS, OGW
- Principal: Mrs. Elishebah Cheruiyot, B.Ed., MBA(HRM), OGW
- Employees: 400+
- Website: https://www.mhskabarak.sc.ke/

Moi High school - Kabarak is located 20 km from Nakuru City, in Kenya's Rift Valley Province along the Nakuru – Eldama Ravine road. It shares the same compound with Kabarak University and Kabarak Primary.

MHSK is a co-educational school located in Kabarak, Nakuru County, Kenya, and has a rich history. The school was established in 1979 as a mixed boarding school by the Late President Daniel Moi, who is one of the longest-serving leaders in Kenya's history. The school was named after the nearby Kabarak Farm owned by President Moi.

== History ==
In the years since its founding, Moi High School Kabarak has undergone significant changes. In the 1990s, the school introduced a primary school and later, a kindergarten. The primary school has since become a feeder school to the high school. The school also introduced a new curriculum to the high school, which emphasizes holistic education.

One of the most significant changes to the school occurred in 2002. After President Moi retired from politics, the management of the school was handed over to a board of governors. At the same time, the school started to register students directly with the Ministry of Education, marking the end of an era in which the school had been a private institution.

Over the years, Moi High School Kabarak has produced a large number of successful alumni, who have gone on to excel in various fields. The school has also participated in academic and sporting events at both national and international levels. For example, the school has sent students to represent Kenya in international competitions such as the World Scholar's Cup, the International Mathematical Olympiad, and the International Physics Olympiad.

Currently, Moi High School Kabarak has over 2,000 students, both male and female, and offers a wide range of academic programs. The school also offers a variety of extracurricular activities, including sports, music, and drama.

== Admission ==
The school attracts students with the highest academic performance. The Kenya Certificate of Primary Education (KCPE) average test score for Kabarak admission 385 or higher. Due to the high number of applicants -over 1500- admission to the school is very competitive. Owing to the school's high fees many of the children admitted come from well-to-do backgrounds though orphans and nomadic youth are supported by the school's patron, former Kenyan president Daniel arap Moi. In the year 2012 it was the first Moi High School. Only 150 will be admitted above 400 and 50 above 385.

== Curriculum ==
The school currently offers the 8-4-4 curriculum, which is the national curriculum in Kenya. In the first year at the school, a student has to take the following compulsory subjects – Mathematics, Languages (English and Kiswahili), Sciences (Biology, Chemistry and Physics), Geography, History and Christian Religious Education. On top of this, the student also has to choose one of the following optional subjects – Agriculture, Business Studies, French, Computer Studies, German or Music. Upon entering form two, the student can take a minimum of 7 subjects to be examined in the K.C.S.E as per the Kenya National Examinations Council (K.N.E.C) guidelines. Most of the students, however, take 8 subjects.

== Alumni ==
- David Kibet - Middle distance runner
- Hon. Nixon Kiprotich Korir - Member of Parliament
- Moses Lessonet - Politician
