= John Kiarie Waweru =

Kenyan MP, comedian and communications professional

Honourable John Kiarie Waweru MP
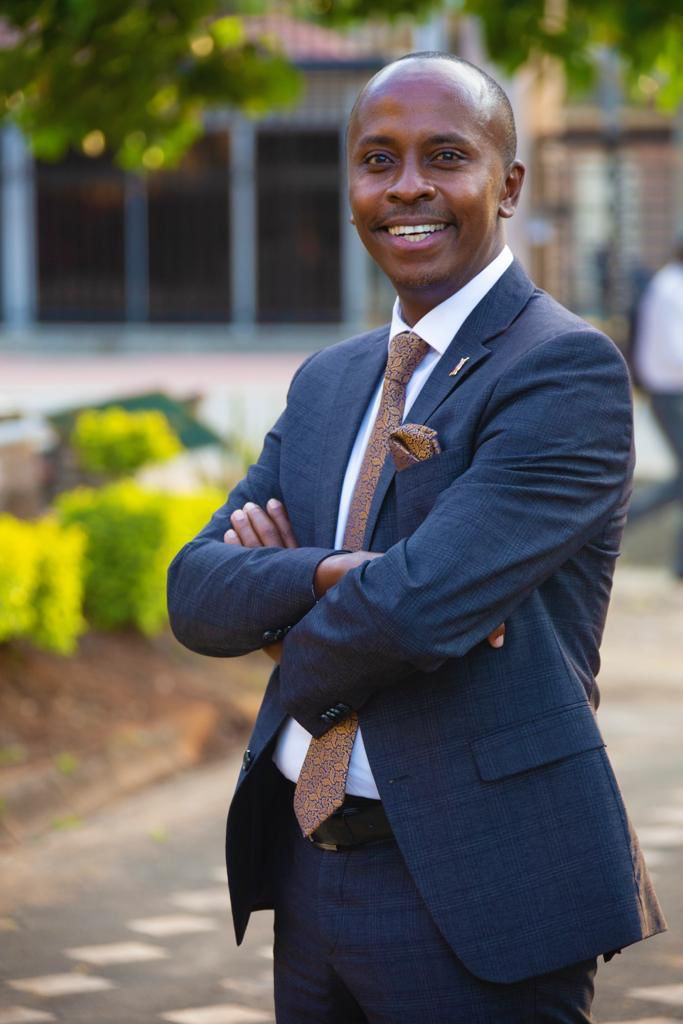
- Kiarie in 2023

Member of Parliament for Dagoretti South
- Incumbent
- Assumed office 2017
- Preceded by: Dennis Waweru

Personal details
- Born: 1978 (age 47–48) Nairobi, Kenya
- Party: United Democratic Alliance (formerly Jubilee; earlier ODM)
- Education: Kenyatta University (BEd, Fine Art); Daystar University (MA, Development Communications)
- Occupation: Politician; Comedian; Media and communications professional; Educator

John Kìarie Wawerū (born 1978), commonly known as KJ, is a Kenyan politician, comedian, media and communications professional, and educator. He has represented Dagoretti South Constituency in Nairobi County since 2017. Before entering politics, he was a co‑founder of the satirical comedy troupe Redykyulass and had a distinguished career across journalism, advertising, public campaigns, and board governance.

== Early life and education ==
John Kìarie was born in Nairobi in 1978. He attended Kileleshwa Primary and Dagoretti High School, excelling in drama, public speaking and science. He earned a BEd in Fine Art from Kenyatta University in 2001 and taught art and drama before returning to study at Daystar University, where he received his MA in Development Communications in 2024.

== Media and communications career ==
Hon. Kìarie began his professional journey at the Nation Media Group in 1995, serving as a correspondent and features cartoonist for the Sunday Nation and Daily Nation until 2007. His popular column, "On a HEAD ON CORRISHON With the Youth," along with his in‐depth features, earned him a reputation for civic commentary.

While still at Nation Media Group, Kìarie entered the advertising industry. In April 2008, he joined Ogilvy & Mather (later Ogilvy Kenya) as a junior creative, rising to Art Director. He then served as Associate Creative Director at McCann Erickson before moving on to become Creative Director at Scanad Group (2008–2011) and later as Creative Director, Ogilvy Africa (2008–2011). During this period, he worked on campaigns for clients such as Kenya Power, Equity Bank Group, EABL, PSK, GSK Kenya, and Coca-Cola, and was part of the pioneering teams that "Africanised" Kenyan advertising by integrating Sheng and other local languages into major campaigns.

From December 2008 to September 2012, Kìarie served as a Director on the Athi Water Services Board, the regional water board overseeing 13 Water Services Companies (including Nairobi Water and Sewerage Company). He was elected Chairperson of the Strategy and Business Development Committee, guiding the board's planning and policy‐development initiatives.

Between 2003 and 2008, he also served as a Director at Youth Agenda, where he helped design youth empowerment and civic‐education initiatives.

In October 2011, Kìarie co-founded Transcend Media Group, serving as Creative Director until November 2016. At Transcend, he led digital outreach and creative strategy for NGOs, public institutions (including the Communications Authority of Kenya and NYS), and corporate clients. Under his leadership, Transcend became known for youth-focused campaigns that combined strategic communication with civic engagement.

== Comedy and public influence ==
In 1998, while at Kenyatta University, Kìarie co-founded Redykyulass with Walter Mong'are and Tony Njuguna, renowned for political impersonations and satirical commentary targeting leaders like Moi and Kibaki.

Redykyulass shaped Kenya's comedy scene—*The Standard* described them as "Kenya's most influential comedy act." They reunited for a nationwide tour in 2021 to celebrate their legacy.

== Political career ==
Kìarie first sought the ODM nomination in Dagoretti South (2007, 2013) before joining Jubilee Party in 2016. He won the 2017 nomination with 9,792 votes and was elected MP that August.

In the 12th Parliament (2017–2022), he served on the Justice and Legal Affairs Committee as non-legal representative. In the 13th Parliament (2022–), he sits on the Procedure & House Rules and Liaison Committees.

He joined Kenya's delegations to the ACP–EU Parliamentary Assembly and the IPU, where he served two terms as President of the IPU Committee on International Humanitarian Law.

He is President of the World Scouts Parliamentary Union (Kenya) and Global Vice-President of the World Scout Parliamentary Union (Third Vice-President 2017–2022, now deputising President Gyu‑Back Ahn of South Korea).

== Advocacy and youth engagement ==
In November 2024, he advocated for a National Science Museum in Parliament. He also led recovery efforts for Lenana Primary after a 2019 school collapse tragedy in Dagoretti South.

Throughout his career, Kìarie has prioritized youth mobilization and civic education. His early work with Redykyulass sought to energize young voters through satire. In Parliament, he has championed initiatives to improve STEM education, leveraging his own background as a science congress winner. In November 2024, he proposed the establishment of a National Science Museum to inspire innovation among students.

Kìarie has also focused on youth mentorship and inclusion. In February 2024, he stated that "young people lack someone to advise them" and urged more structured mentorship initiatives.

== Political career ==
Kìarie first contested for Parliament under the Orange Democratic Movement (ODM) ticket in 2007 and again in 2013, but was not elected. In early 2016, he left ODM and joined President Uhuru Kenyatta's Jubilee Party. In the 2017 Jubilee nomination for Dagoretti South Constituency, Kìarie topped the primary, defeating the incumbent Dennis Wawerū with 9,792 votes to 9,052.

In 2022, Kìarie aligned with United Democratic Alliance (UDA) and successfully defended his seat, polling 26,394 votes against the Jubilee candidate's 22,773. In the 13th Parliament, he was elected Chairperson of the National Assembly's Committee on Communications, Information and Innovation and serves on the Education Committee.
