= Benjamin Mwangi =

Kenyan politician

Benjamin Mwangi is a Kenyan politician from the United Democratic Alliance and MP for Embakasi Central. First elected as a member of parliament in 2017 under the jubilee party as member of parliament Embakasi Central constituency, he is now serving his second term in office.

== See also ==
- 13th Parliament of Kenya
