= Nixon Kiprotich Korir =

Kenyan politician

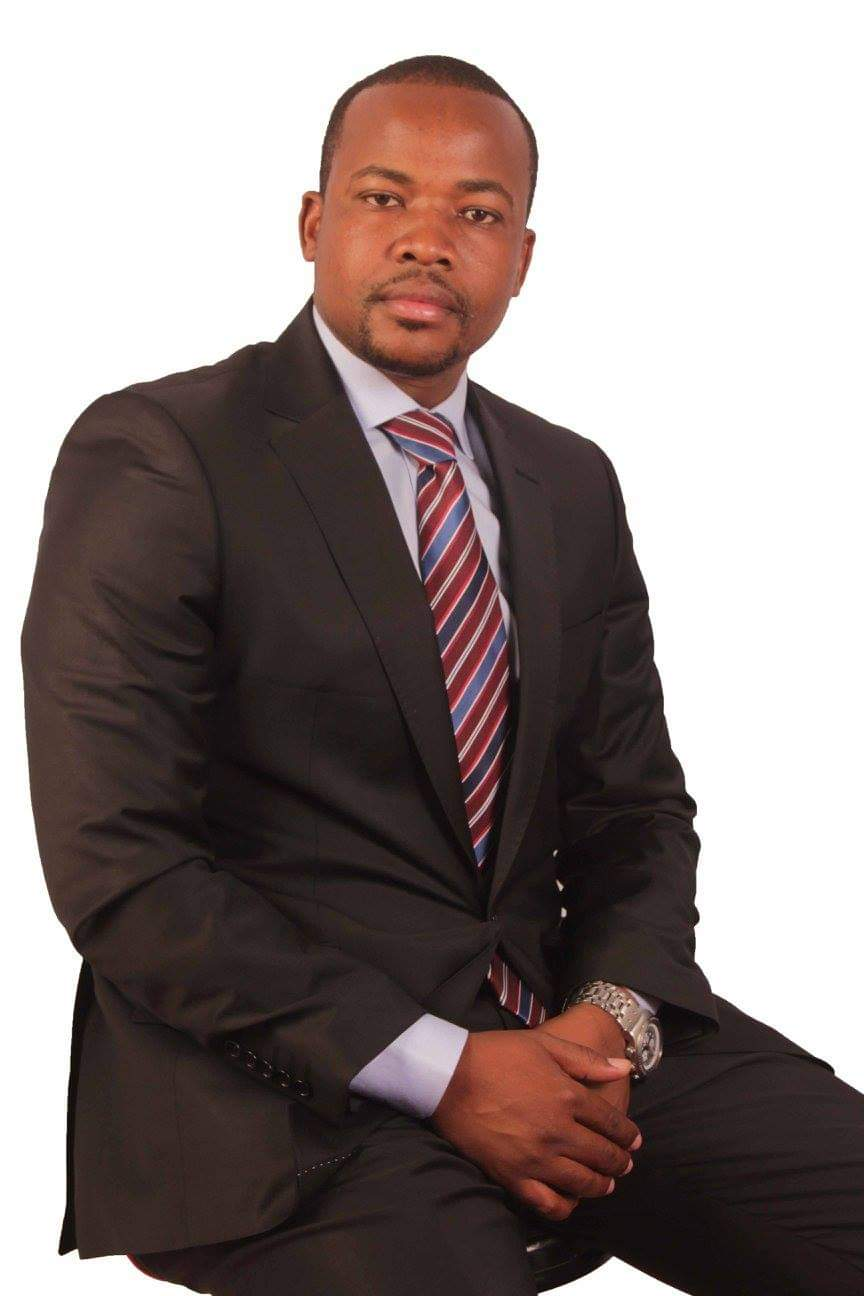
Hon Nixon Korir

Nixon Korir is a Kenyan politician and serves as the nominated principal secretary for State Department for Lands and Physical Planning in Kenya.

His role as the Secretary Youth Affairs involved oversight of youth-related functions of the Government of Kenya including the Uwezo Fund, Youth Enterprise Development Fund, the National Youth Service and the Kenya National Volunteers Programme.

He graduated from Moi High School Kabarak in 2004 and enrolled in the University of Nairobi (UON) in 2006. He later qualified as a lawyer, having graduated from UON in December 2011.

== Student Leadership ==
In 2007, while an undergraduate, Korir served as a Congressman at the University of Nairobi and in 2008, he became the School of Law President. In 2009, he became Secretary General of the Students' Organization of Nairobi University (SONU). He was also active in the 2010 referendum as a national youth leader of the NO camp led by William Ruto. The NO camp was defeated by the YES camp of Prime Minister Raila Odinga.

== Impact on Youth Affairs ==
Korir has been instrumental in the formulation and the implementation of the Kenya National Volunteer Programme. Under his leadership as the Chair of the Kenya Graduate Volunteer programme, three key objectives have been set: to promote national cohesion, to create job opportunities for 30,000 unemployed youths, and to improve learning in public primary schools.

The volunteer programme seeks to promote national cohesion by ensuring that graduates are posted to counties far from their home. The volunteers are also boarded by host families so that graduates can experience different cultures and religions.

== Personal life ==
Korir is married to Berryl Zoraima. They have three children together 2 daughters and a son.

== Political career ==
After graduating from the UON, he was employed by H.E. Hon. William Ruto to serve as his first personal assistant while Ruto was the MP for Eldoret North Constituency. Korir is the former Member of Parliament for Langata Constituency, a position that he lost to Felix Odiwour aka "Jalas" . He made history as the first Kalenjin to be elected as a Member of Parliament in Nairobi particularly in an area that was dominated by leadership from the Orange Democratic Movement (ODM) party. He is also the former Secretary Youth Affairs under the executive office of the President. He was also the founding Chairman of the United Republican Party, and remains a member. Korir also served as the Executive Director of the United Republican Party (URP) secretariat.

On the 4th of March 2013, Korir joined the contest for the Langata constituency national assembly seat on a URP(United Republican Party) ticket. He garnered 17,740 votes in the election, finishing a distant second after Joash Olum of the ODM who won with 25,394 votes.
