= Ronald Karauri =

Kenya politician and businessman

The Honourable Ronald Karauri

Member of Parliament for Kasarani
- Incumbent
- Assumed office 8 September 2022
- President: William Ruto
- Preceded by: Mercy Gakuya
- Constituency: Kasarani Constituency

Personal details
- Born: Ronald Kamwiko Karauri; 25 August 1978 (age 48) Meru County, Kenya
- Citizenship: Kenya
- Spouse: Ruth Karauri
- Children: 3
- Parent: Mathews Adams Karauri
- Education: University of Nairobi
- Occupation: Politician; businessman
- Profession: Pilot
- Nickname: Captain

Ronald Karauri Kamwiko (born 25 August 1978), also known as Captain, is a Kenyan businessman and politician who is the current member of parliament for Kasarani Constituency. He was elected in the 2022 general elections on an independent ticket. He is a retired pilot and was the chairperson of the Kenya Airline Pilots Association before his 2015 retirement. He co-founded SportPesa in 2014 and is the chief executive officer of the company.

== Early life and education ==
Karauri was born on August 25, 1978 in Meru County and is the son of the former Member of Parliament for Tigania East Constituency and the former Education Assistant Minister, Mathews Adams Karauri.

He grew up in Nairobi's Buruburu estate and attained his Kenya Certificate of Primary Education from Harambe Primary School. He proceeded to join Mang'u High School in 1993 for his secondary education, where he completed his Kenya Certificate for Secondary Education in 1996. The following year, he joined the University of Nairobi and enrolled for mechanical engineering before dropping out to study aviation.

In 2014, Karauri was certified to fly commercial planes after he attained his Airline Transport Pilot Licence from the Kenya Civil Aviation Authority.

== Career ==
=== Aviation ===
Karauri was among the selected cadet trainees by Kenya Airways in the year 2000 who were trained in Ethiopia and by 2002 he became a first officer on regional and international routes. By 2009, he was promoted to captain and served till 2015 before retiring to serve as the CEO of SportPesa.

He served as the chairperson of the Kenya Airlines Pilots Association till 2014 when he quit.

=== SportPesa ===
In 2014, Karauri cofounded SportPesa under the company Pevans East Africa alongside Paul Ndung'u, Asenath Wachera Maina, Francis Waweru Kiarie, Robert Kenneth Wanyoike and Valentina Nikolova. He stepped in as the company's CEO in 2015 replacing Guerassim Nikolov.

He was the chairman of the Association of Gaming Operators of Kenya (AGOK) and later replaced by Sasa Krneta.

=== Political career ===
Karauri declared his bid for the Kasarani Member of Parliament seat on February 22, 2022 and managed to win it with 32,406 votes against John Njoroge's 30,444 and the incumbent Mercy Gakuya, who had 24,790.

He made an announcement in Njiru ward on 22 February 2026, declaring his bid for the Nairobi governor's seat on the coming 2027 general elections.

== Personal life ==
He is married to Ruth Karauri, with whom they have three kids, Nathan, Natalie and Nia.

== See also ==
- Kenya Airways
- The 13th Parliament of Kenya
- SportPesa
- 2022 Kenyan general elections
- 2027 Kenyan general elections
