= Lucky Summer Ward =

Lucky Summer Ward is a ward in Ruaraka Constituency, Nairobi County, Kenya. It has a population of around 30,000 people and covers 1.95 km^{2}.

Victor Omondi Ochola(Ringo) represents the ward on the Nairobi City County Assembly, and Sospeter Anduru is the Ward Administrator and Sammy Aluse Ondego alias Shash being his biggest supporter, artist and blogger. It was formerly part of the Kasarani constituency.
