= Joash Olum =

Kenyan politician

Joash Olum is a Kenyan politician. Olum is the former Member of Parliament for the Langata Constituency, a position that he lost to Nixon Kiprotich Korir. Since 2010 he has been part of the Orange Democratic Movement.

In 2017, Olum faced accusations for issuing threats to a property owner in Nairobi over defaulted rent payment for a house which he allegedly rented for a friend.

A school in Nairobi, Josah Olum Highrise Primary and Junior Secondary School is named after the politician.

== Political career ==
Olum ran for the seat of the Langata Constituency in the 2013 Kenyan general election. He won the election with 25,394 votes, ahead of Nixon Kiprotich Korir, who finished with 17,470 votes.
