= Patrick Makau (politician) =

Kenyan politician and Member of Parliament

Hon. Patrick Makau King'ola
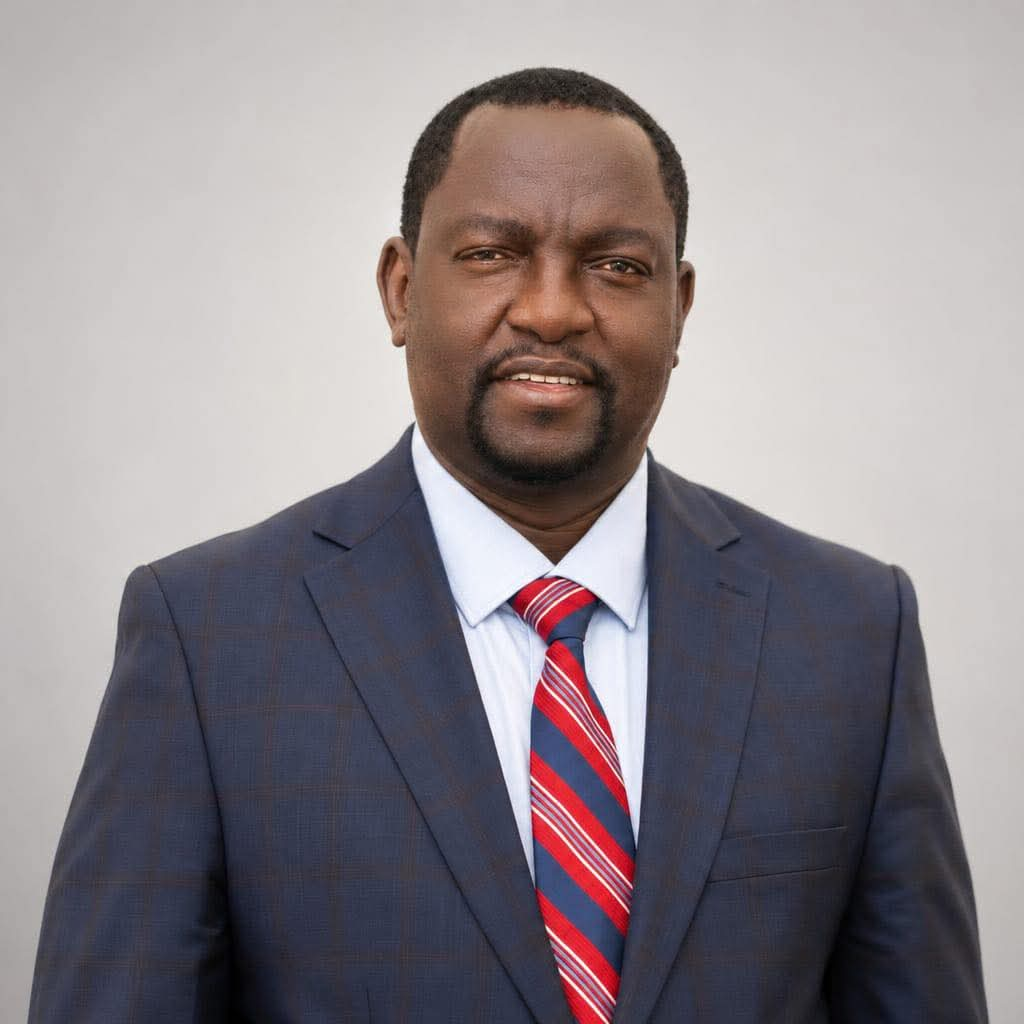

Member of Parliament for Mavoko Constituency
- In office 2013–present
- Preceded by: Wavinya Ndeti
- Constituency: Mavoko Constituency

Personal details
- Party: Wiper Patriotic Front
- Occupation: Politician
- Known for: Representation of Mavoko Constituency

Patrick Makau King'ola is a Kenyan politician who is currently a Wiper Democratic Movement – Kenya Member of the National Assembly representing Mavoko Constituency.

He was educated at Kagumo High School, Nkubu High School and Strathmore School.

He was arrested on 13 July 2023 at his home in Karen, Nairobi, during anti-government protests.
