= Elizabeth Ongoro =

Kenyan politician

Elizabeth Ongoro is a Kenyan politician. Until 2023, she belonged to Orange Democratic Movement and was elected to represent the Kasarani Constituency in the 10th Parliamentof the National Assembly of Kenya from the 2007 Kenyan parliamentary election to the 2013 Kenyan parliamentary election. In 2023, Elizabeth defected from ODM to UDA party citing frustrations from her former Party. Elizabeth is married to Ferdinand Masha Kenga and together they have two children, Rehema and Joshua.
