= Embakasi North Constituency =

Constituency in Nairobi County, Kenya

Embakasi North
- constituency for the Parliament of Kenya
- Embakasi North Constituency within Nairobi City County

- Nairobi City County within Kenya
- County: Nairobi City
- Area: 5.5 km^{2} (2.1 sq mi)

Current constituency
- Created: 2013
- Number of members: One
- Party: UDA
- Member of Parliament: James Gakuya
- Created from: Embakasi and Kasarani

Embakasi North is a constituency in Kenya and one of the seventeen constituencies in Nairobi County. Embakasi North includes five electoral wards: Kariobangi North, Dandora Area I, Dandora Area II, Dandora Area III, and Dandora Area IV. The constituency has an area of 5.50 km^{2} (2.1 sq mi). It was created prior to the 2013 election when Kasarani Constituency and Embakasi Constituency boundaries were revised. The constituency forms part of two sub-counties of Nairobi; Kariobangi North falls under Kasarani while the Dandora area is in Njiru.

== Members of Parliament ==
Embakasi North Constituency was created from Embakasi and Kasarani constituencies.

Members of Parliament for Embakasi North Constituency
Elections	MP	Party	Notes
2013	James Mwangi Gakuya	TNA	
2017	James Mwangi Gakuya	Jubilee Party	
2022	James Mwangi Gakuya	UDA	Gakuya switched party affiliation to the UDA.
