= St. Kizito Vocational Training Institute =

Catholic school in Githurai Kimbo, Kenya

St. Kizito Vocational Training Institute is a Catholic-based training institute located in Githurai Kimbo, approximately 20.8 kilometers from Nairobi.

The institute is dedicated to providing job training to young people to address their primary socio-economic needs. Given the challenges of unemployment and rapid population growth, there is a pressing demand for educational opportunities in technical fields. Therefore, St. Kizito aims to bridge this gap in the labor market by offering interventions, development programs, and educational initiatives to cultivate a diverse pool of talents. St. Kizito is recognized as an Institute of Technology & Examination Centre registered by the Government under Registration No. MOEST/PC/886/04.
