= Mavoko Constituency =

Electoral constituency of Kenya

Mavoko
- constituency for the Parliament of Kenya
- Mavoko Constituency within Machakos County

- Machakos County within Kenya
- County: Machakos

Current constituency
- Number of members: 1
- Party: Wiper
- Member of Parliament: Patrick Makau King'ola
- Wards: 4

Mavoko Constituency is a constituency in Kenya. It is one of eight constituencies in Machakos County., formerly part of Kathiani constituency up to 2013. Mavoko is the most industrialized constituency in Kenya, hosting six cement companies (Savannah Cement, Portland Cement, Bamburi Cement, Mombasa Cement, Simba Cement, and Athi River Mining) and the whole of EPZ with over 30 industries. It is also home to several steel industries including Devki Steel Mills, and tens of industries manufacturing construction products such as floor tiles and roofing materials. More than 20 fast moving consumer goods industries are located in Mavoko, including Wrigleys. Kenya Meat Commission, Meat Training Institute, Daystar University, the National Call Center for Safaricom Inc, and Nation Media Group newspaper printing plant are also located in Mavoko. Some of the towns in the constituency include parts of Utawala, Athi River, Mlolongo, Kamulu, Joska, Malaa, and Kyumbi (Machakos Junction).

== Electoral history ==
Members of Parliament
2013	Patrick Makau Kingola	Wiper
2017	Patrick Makau Kingola	Wiper
2022	Patrick Makau Kingola	Wiper
