= Dagoretti North Constituency =

Kenyan electoral constituency

Dagoretti North
- constituency for the Parliament of Kenya
- Dagoretti North Constituency within Nairobi City County

- Nairobi City County within Kenya
- County: Nairobi City

Current constituency
- Created: 2013
- Party: ODM
- Member: Beatrice Elachi
- Created from: Westlands & Dagoretti

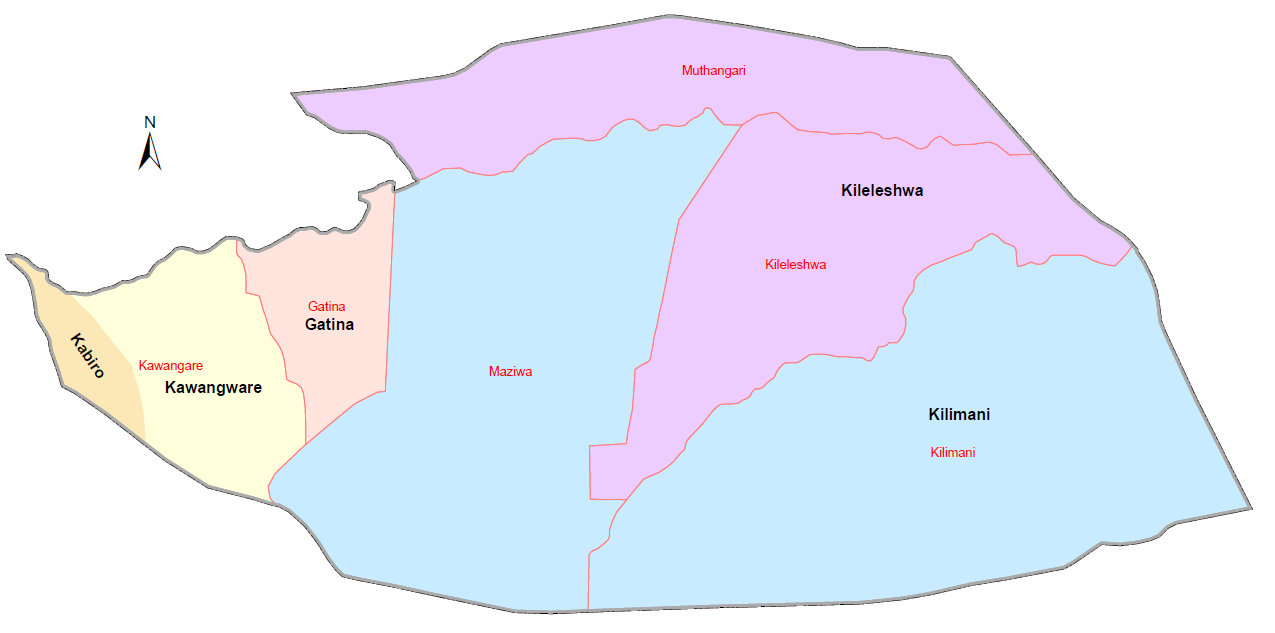
Map of Dagoretti according to IEBC

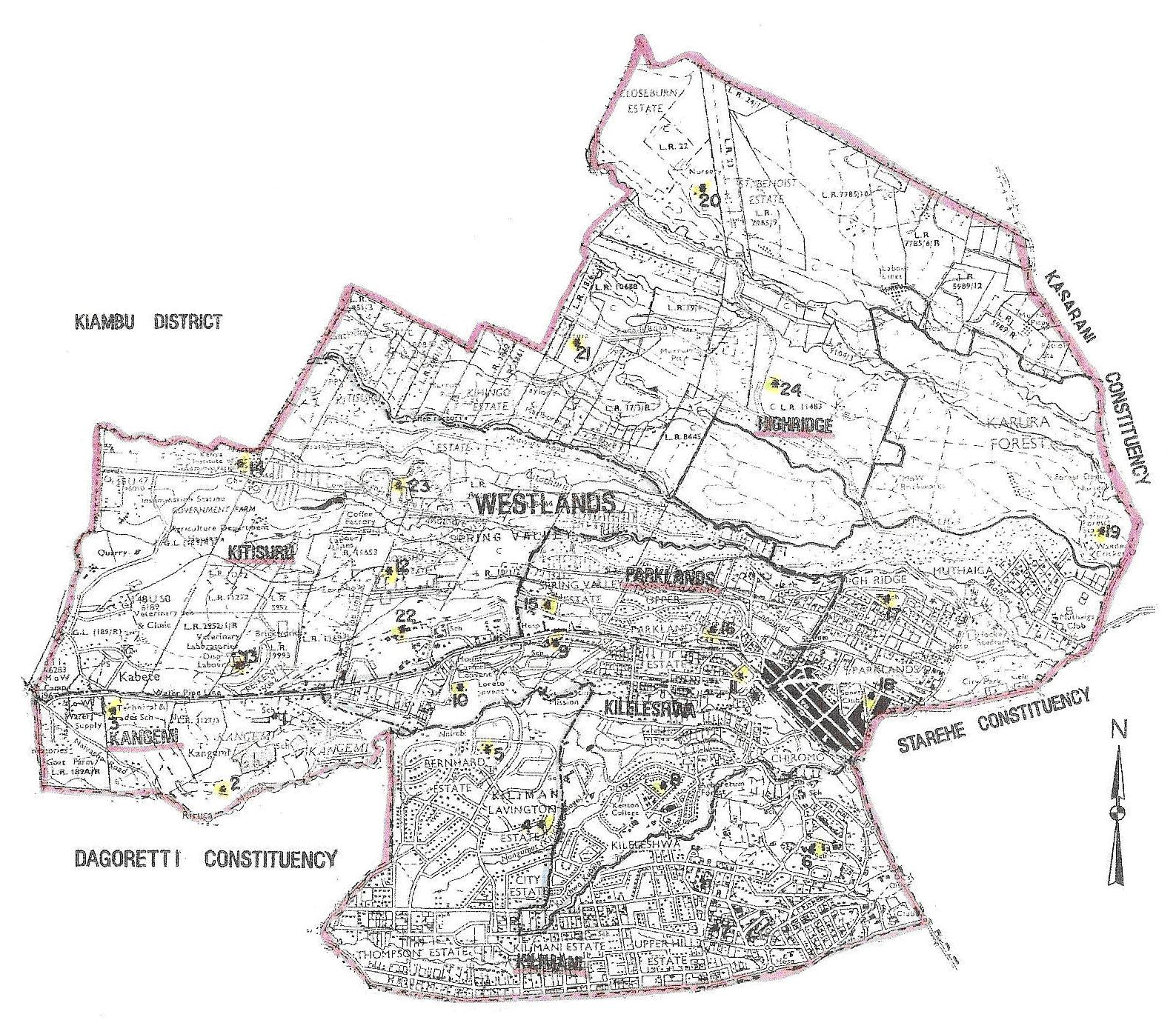
Westlands Constituency 1969-2012 (Kenya)

Dagoretti North Constituency is one of 17 electoral constituency of Nairobi County created by the Independent Electoral and Boundaries Commission before the 2013 general election. Most of the area that forms Dagoretti North constituency was part of Westlands Constituency. A smaller portion of it was hived off from Dagoretti Constituency.

== Electoral history ==
Elections	MP	Party	Notes
Embakasi North Constituency created from Westlands and Dagoretti
2013	Paul Simba Arati	ODM	
2017	Paul Simba Arati	ODM	
2022	Beatrice Elachi	ODM	

== Wards ==
Ward	Population	Area (km^{2})
Kilimani	43,122	16.1
Kawangware	33,707	1.2
Gatina	43,627	1.5
Kileleshwa	27,202	9
Kabiro	33,707	1.2
