= Embakasi Central Constituency =

Constituency in Nairobi County, Kenya

Embakasi Central
- constituency for the Parliament of Kenya
- County: Nairobi City
- Area: 14.3 km^{2} (5.5 sq mi)

Current constituency
- Created: 2013
- Number of members: One
- Party: UDA
- Member of Parliament: Benjamin Mwangi
- Created from: Embakasi
- Website/Url: https://embakasicentralngcdf.ke

Embakasi Central is a constituency in Nairobi and is one of seventeen constituencies in Nairobi County, with an area of 14.30 km^{2} (5.5 sq mi). Embakasi Central includes five electoral wards: Kayole North, Kayole Central, Kayole South, Komarock, and Matopeni/Spring Valley.

== Members of parliament ==
- Benjamin Mwangi; he faced a stiff competition from Billy Agutu of ODM Party but won.

== Website ==
- embakasicentralngcdf.ke. The constituency has its official website that gives more information on its respective wards and opportunities.
