= Githurai =

Mixed-use settlements in Nairobi County and Kiambu County, Kenya

- Suburb
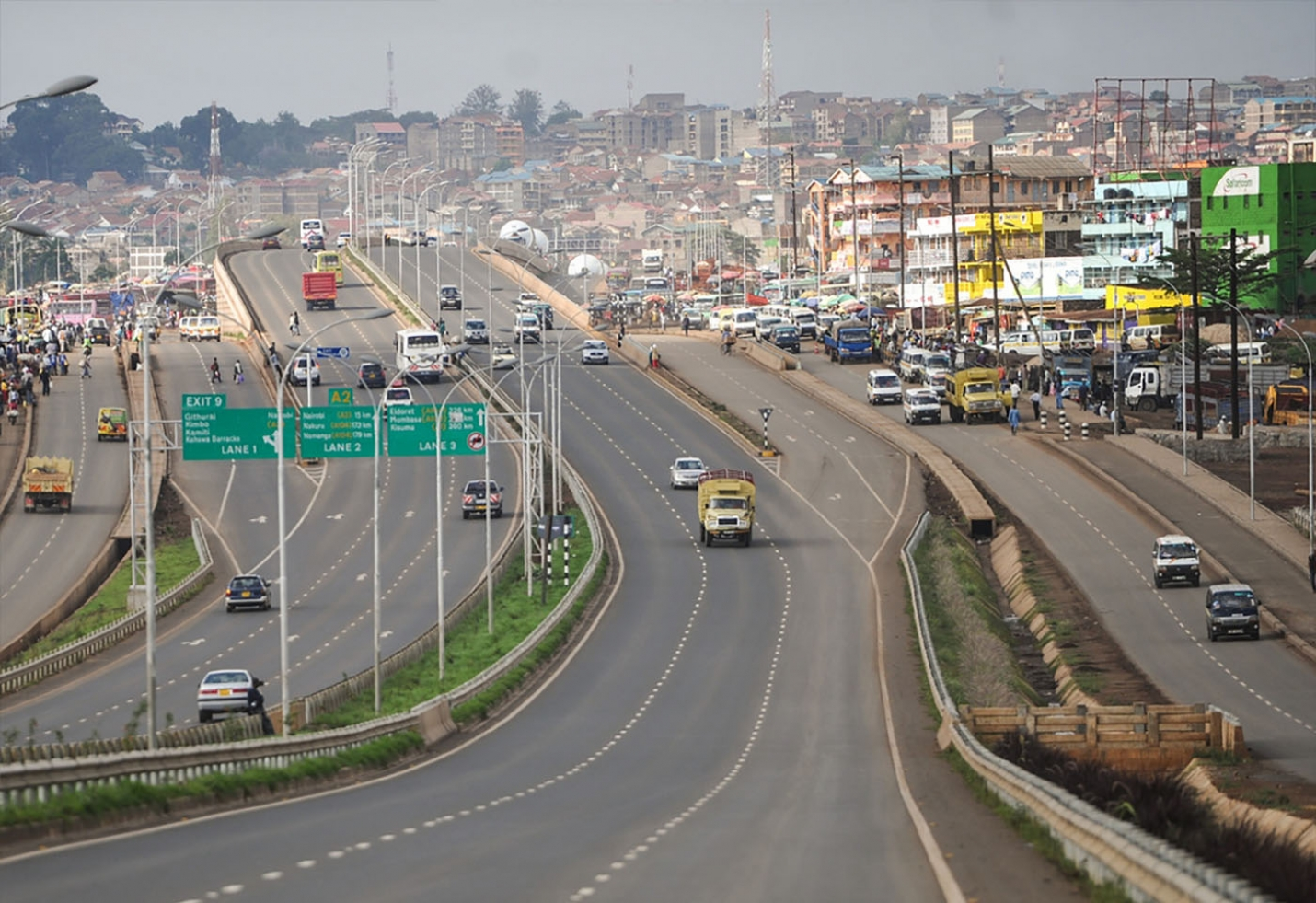
- Githurai viewed from Thika road.
- Nickname: Githu
- Country: Kenya
- County: Nairobi County & Kiambu County
- Sub-counties: Kasarani & Githurai

Area
  - Total: 25.5 km^{2} (9.8 sq mi)

Population (2019)
  - Total: 262,327
  - Density: 17,477/km^{2} (45,270/sq mi)
- Population in Githurai sub-locations in Nairobi and Kiambu counties
- Time zone: UTC+3 (EAT)
- Postal code: 00232

Githurai is a composition of densely populated, urban, mixed-use settlements located at the border of Nairobi County and Kiambu County along the Thika Road. Githurai is divided into two; Githurai 45 (also known as Githurai Kimbo) and Githurai 44. Githurai 45 falls under Ruiru Municipality in the Githurai Sub-county of Kiambu County with the boundary being the Thika Road reserve and River Kasarani (also known as River Gathara-ini) downstream. Githurai 44 is domiciled in the Kasarani Sub-county of Nairobi County. Githurai 44 neighbours Kahawa West, Zimmerman and Njatha-ini Village.

== Infrastructure ==
Githurai is home to St Lucie Kiriri Girls High School and Kiriri Women's University of Science and Technology, Lily Academy and St. Kizito Vocational Training Institute. Githurai is served by the Thika Road Super Highway and a branch of the Kenya-Uganda Railway from Nairobi to Thika via Ruiru. There exists a Kenya Army Amoury belonging to the Kahawa Garrison/Barracks in Githurai Kimbo. A Githurai Shopping Centre exists. Githurai Community Clinic is near, but not in Githurai. Other residential areas in Nairobi include Kahawa, Kasarani, Dandora, Ongata Rongai and Ruai. Githurai is extremely urban and heavily dominated by the Kikuyu tribe who are proficient in business. The presence of multiple campuses in the vicinity of the town has also increased the population exponentially.

== Politics ==
Githurai is widely regarded as the "gateway" to the Mount Kenya political bedrock. Politicians looking to cement their presence in the vote-rich mountain region often use the Githurai area as a launching pad for their politics.

== See also ==
- Kahawa
- Kasarani
- Dandora
- Ongata Rongai
