= Roysambu Constituency =

Constituency in Nairobi County, Kenya

Roysambu
- constituency for the Parliament of Kenya
- Roysambu Constituency within Nairobi City County

- Nairobi City County within Kenya
- County: Nairobi City
- Area: 48.80 km^{2} (18.8 sq mi)

Current constituency
- Created: 2013
- Number of members: One
- Party: UDA
- Member of Parliament: Augustine Kamande
- Created from: Kasarani

Roysambu Constituency is an electoral constituency in Nairobi. It is one of seventeen constituencies in Nairobi City County. It was created prior to the 2013 general election, when Kasarani Constituency was divided into three constituencies: Kasarani, Roysambu and Ruaraka.

It borders Mathare Constituency to the south, Ruaraka and Kasarani constituencies to the east, Ruiru constituency to the north and northeast, Kiambu constituency to the northwest and Westlands constituency to the west. It is the northmost constituency in Nairobi with an area of 48.80 km^{2} (18.8 sq mi).

It contains neighbourhoods such as Garden Estate, Thome, Balozi, Zimmerman, Kahawa West and part of Githurai. Kenyatta University, United States International University, Kamiti Maximum Security Prison, National Youth Service headquarters, General Service Unit headquarters are also found here.

It has 5 wards namely Roysambu, Zimmerman, Githurai, Kahawa and Kahawa West.

The constituency is within Kasarani Sub-county.
