= Dagoretti South Constituency =

Electoral constituency in Kenya

Dagoretti South
- constituency for the Parliament of Kenya
- Dagoretti South Constituency within Nairobi City County

- Nairobi City County within Kenya
- County: Nairobi City
- Population: Under 434,208 (Dagoretti North and South merged in 2019 census)
- Area: Under 29 km^{2} (11.2 sq mi)

Current constituency
- Created: 2013
- Number of members: One
- Party: UDA
- Member: John Kiarie
- Created from: Dagoretti
- Wards: 5

Dagoretti South is an electoral constituency in Kenya. It is one of seventeen constituencies of Nairobi County. The entire constituency is located within Nairobi County.

The constituency was created prior to the general election of 2013, when Dagoretti Constituency was divided, with the bulk of the western and southern parts forming Dagoretti South Constituency. The south-east stretch was combined with part of Lang'ata Constituency to form Kibra Constituency and the rest was combined with part of Westlands Constituency to form Dagoretti North Constituency. The constituency has an area of 25.30 km^{2} (9.8 sq mi).

The area member of parliament is John Kiarie.

== Members of Parliament ==
Elections	MP	Party	Notes
Dagoretti South Constituency created from Dagoretti
2013	Dennis Kariuki Waweru	TNA	
2017	John Kiarie Wareru	Jubilee Party	
2022	John Kiarie Wareru	UDA	

== Wards ==
Dagoretti South constituency has 5 wards and 114,930 registered voters as of 2022.

Ward	Registered Voters
Mutu-ini	13,484
Ngando	24,892
Riruta	37,766
Uthiru/Ruthimitu	19,657
Waithaka	19,131
Total	114,930
*As of 2022
