= Kasarani =

- Location in Kenya
- Coordinates: 01°13′44″S 36°54′16″E
- Country: Kenya
- County: Nairobi City
- Sub-county: Kasarani
- Time zone: UTC+3 (EAT)

Kasarani is a mixed-use neighbourhood in northeast Nairobi. Kasarani is also used in reference to the city's second most populated sub-county with the same name, encompassing various neighbourhoods in the northeastern areas of Nairobi. Located within the larger Kasarani area, the Kasarani enclave is approximately 11 kilometres (7 mi) (7 miles) northeast of Nairobi's central business district off Thika Road.

== Location ==
The Kasarani neighbourhood is located along Thika Road, approximately 12 kilometres (7.5 mi), by road, northeast of Nairobi's central business district.

The greater Kasarani area has other suburbs domiciled within it and shares common boundaries with what was known as Kasarani Division prior to 2013. Areas that are electorally placed in Roysambu, Ruaraka, part of Kasarani, and part of Emabakasi North constituencies are within the Kasarani Sub-county of Nairobi.

== Naming ==
It is believed that the name Kasarani originated from a river that flows through the area which has the Kikuyu name "Gathara-ini" River.

== Sports ==
Kasarani is home to the Moi International Sports Centre (Alias. Kasarani Stadium), named after former President Daniel arap Moi. The sports complex has a stadium, gymnasium, swimming pool and hotel. The stadium hosts the Harambee Stars for international matches, and is the home ground for Mathare United and Tusker F.C. of the Kenyan Premier League.

The indoor arena is used for volleyball, and is the home venue for the Kenya women's national volleyball team.

== Notable landmarks ==
Kasarani is home to the USIU Africa and Pan African Christian University campuses, Kasarani Technical and Vocational College in Kamulu, Ruai, Jalyn Junior Academy , ST Agnes Learning Centre in hunters church street and Kasarani Group of Schools. The Sport view Hotel and Safari Park Hotel are also here. The area also has the Garden City, and Thika Road malls shopping complexes off the Thika Road highway. Jewel Complex is another commercial building.

== Notable businesses ==
Kasarani is served by several shopping mails such as Mountain Mall, Thika Road Mall and Garden City. Kasarani Portal, an enterprise listing businesses in Kasarani is located in Seasons Estate. There is also Equity Bank branch in the region and Modesto Kitchen & bar.

== See also ==
- Githurai
- Kahawa
- Dandora
- Ongata Rongai
