= Ruaraka Constituency =

Kenyan electoral constituency

Ruaraka
- constituency for the Parliament of Kenya
- Ruaraka Constituency within Nairobi City County

- Nairobi City County within Kenya
- County: Nairobi City
- Area: 7.20 km^{2} (2.8 sq mi)

Current constituency
- Created: 2013
- Number of members: One
- Party: ODM
- Member of Parliament: Tom Kajwang'
- Created from: Kasarani

Ruaraka Constituency is an electoral constituency located in Nairobi County, Kenya. It is one of seventeen constituencies in the County. The constituency has a population of 192,620 and covers an area of 7.20 km^{2}. It was formed for the 2013 election following proposals by the Independent Electoral and Boundaries Commission which sought to ease political tensions during elections. Ruaraka Constituency was formerly part of Kasarani Constituency. The whole constituency forms part of the Kasarani Sub-county.

== Locations and wards ==
There are five wards in Ruaraka. The population statistics given below are as of 2009.

Ward	Population	km^{2}
Babadogo	30,741	1.95
Utalii	36,275	1.90
Mathare North	53,658	0.50
Lucky Summer	30,000	1.95
Korogocho	41,946	0.90

== Members of Parliament ==
Elections	MP	Party	Notes
2007	Elizabeth Ongoro	ODM	
2013	Thomas Joseph Kajwang	ODM	
2022	Thomas Joseph Kajwang	ODM	
