= Dagoretti =

Area in the western part of Nairobi, Kenya

Coordinates: 01°18′00″S 36°46′00″E

Dagoretti is an area in the western part of Nairobi, the capital of Kenya. It straddles the Nairobi and Kiambu County boundary with the Dagoretti Road Reserve marking the psychological border point heading northerly and north-easterly. Administratively it is one of eight divisions of Nairobi. The Dagoretti division is divided into six Locations. The former electoral Dagoretti Constituency had the same boundaries as the now defunct Dagoretti division.

== Etymology ==
A possible Maasai origin of the name Dagoretti is the weed entiakuleti or Gomphocarpus physocarpus which grows around the area. This origin may be valid because neighbouring place-names such as Kileleshwa and Uthiru are derived from Maasai words for other vegetation types.

A humorous story retold in Dagoretti Market and Thogoto areas is the mispronunciation of the Kikuyu statement ndagurite, which could mean 'I had bought' or 'he had not bought', depending on the tonality. Apparently, a European man who had acquired land was involved in either a dispute, protest or an enquiry concerning the piece of land and uttered ndagurite to assert his claim of ownership. A crowd of onlooking Kikuyus laughed at his pronunciation and spread the humorous news hence Dagoretti became the name of the area.

Some versions of this story mention Fredrick Lugard in relation to the land at Ndumbuini near Uthiru on which Fort Smith was built. Apparently, after some Kikuyu dwellers shouted ndagurite to meaning that Major Eric Smith had not bought the land, Lugard took ndagurite to be the name of the place. Other versions refer to Karen Blixen's acquisition of vast lands in Karen, which is named after her. This version may be spurious because, unlike other British settlers, Karen Blixen had cordial relationships with natives.

A less likely but widely republished etymology is the Kikuyu mispronunciation of 'the Great Corner' or 'the Great Market' as thagureti in reference to the areas around Dagoretti Corner, Riruta, Ngong Racecourse and possibly Uthiru, another Nairobi suburb. This origin is unlikely because Dagoretti Corner acquired a distinct name long after the name Dagoretti had been applied over the much wider area spanning between Kabete, Thogoto and Karen.

== History ==
It is difficult to say when Dagoretti was first inhabited, but by the late 1890s, when Europeans first visited the area, they found a populated and cultivated territory.

19th century Dagoretti was part of the rich food-producing Kikuyu country and was populated with Masai and Kikuyu people as it lay on the edge of Masai Country. Kikuyu farmed sugar cane and banana among other crops while Maasai kept cattle. The two groups cohabited and their lives together ebbed between trade and raid. In fact some Kikuyus spoke Maasai, some Maasai spoke Gikuyu. The prominent Kikuyu leader Waiyaki wa Hinga is believed to have Maasai heritage.

In August 1890, Fredrick Lugard departed Mombasa for Lake Victoria on behalf of the Imperial British East Africa Company (IBEAC). Part of his mission was to establish treaties with local tribes and build forts along the route to Lake Victoria. Lugard arrived at Dagoretti by October 1890, having walked over 350 miles from Mombasa with his entourage of Sudanese askaris led by Shukri Aga, Somali scouts led by Dualla Idris, and nearly 300 Swahili porters.

Idris had already visited Dagoretti a few years earlier, while serving on Count Sámuel Teleki's 1886 -1889 expedition to Lake Turkana.

Lugard was introduced to local leader and land owner Waiyaki wa Hinga at Dagoretti and they formed an alliance by participating in a traditional blood brotherhood ceremony. Waiyaki helped Lugard identify a piece of land on which to build a fort. The fort at Dagoretti was the seventh IBEAC fort and the first north of Machakos.

== Locations ==
Location	Population*
Kawangware	86,824
Kenyatta/Golf course	30,253
Mutuini	14,521
Riruta Satellite	65,958
Uthiru/Ruthimitu	23,016
Waithaka	19,937
Total	240,081
Source: 1999 census.

== Administration ==
Vast parts of the Dagoretti area fall within Nairobi County's administration. Parts of the area, among them the Dagoretti slaughterhouse, fall in the Kiambu side of the border under the defunct Kikuyu Municipality area.

The area under what was the Dagoretti Constituency was originally part of the defunct County Council of Kiambu but was moved into the then Nairobi City Commission's administration in the 1970s as part of efforts to expand the city area. To-date, the freehold title deeds possessed by land owners in the area are labelled as belonging to Kiambu.

== Transport ==
The main form of transport is by road: small buses (matatus) and buses (Kenya Bus Service, City Hoppa, City Shuttle and Connection Bus) offer short-distance trips to the city centre.

The Dagoretti railway station is on the main line of the national railway system.

== Economic activities ==
The main form of income is in industrial labor, construction, household chores, small scale trading on groceries, and careers in carpentry, masonry and tailoring, also middle class population working in nearby schools, hospitals and other government institutions. An organisation called "Beacon of Hope" trains people in Dagoretti in urban farming skills.

== See also ==
- Railway stations in Kenya
