= Ruiru Constituency =

Electoral constituency in Kenya

Ruiru
- constituency for the Parliament of Kenya
- Ruiru Constituency within Kiambu County

- Kiambu County within Kenya
- County: Kiambu
- Population: 371,111
- Area: 201 km^{2} (77.6 sq mi)

Current constituency
- Created: 2013
- Number of members: 1
- Party: UDA
- Member of Parliament: Simon Ng'ang'a Kingara
- Created from: Juja
- Wards: 8

Ruiru is an electoral constituency in Kenya. It is one of the twelve constituencies in Kiambu County. It has two sub-counties; Githurai and Ruiru. Its current Member of Parliament is Hon. Kingara, Simon Nganga elected on United Democratic Alliance party ticket. The constituency had a total population of 371,111 people during the 2019 census.

== Wards ==
Prior to the 2013 elections, the area was put under the Kiambu County administration new elective wards namely Biashara, Gitothua, Gatongora, Kahawa Sukari, Kahawa Wendani, Mwiki, Mwihoko, and Kiuu.
