= Langata Constituency =

Kenyan electoral constituency

Lang'ata
- constituency for the Parliament of Kenya
- Langata Constituency within Nairobi City County

- Nairobi City County within Kenya
- County: Nairobi City
- Population: 197,489
- Area: 217 km^{2} (83.8 sq mi)

Current constituency
- Created: 1963
- Number of members: 1
- Party: ODM
- Member of Parliament: Phelix Odiwuor

Lang'ata Constituency is an electoral constituency in Nairobi City County. It is one of the seventeen constituencies in the county, consisting of southern and southwestern areas of Nairobi. Langata constituency had common boundaries with a now-defunct Kibera Division of Nairobi. It is the largest constituency in Nairobi with an area of 196.80 km^{2} (76.0 sq mi). It was known as Nairobi South Constituency at the 1963 elections but since the 1969 elections it has been known as Lang'ata Constituency.

Kibera, Kenya's largest slum, borders Lang'ata Constituency, and was part of it before the creation of Kibra Constituency by the Independent Electoral and Boundaries Commission; though there is a smaller portion of the slum that is still part of Lang'ata Constituency.

The affluent suburb of Karen and the mainly middle class Lang'ata suburb are part of Langata Constituency, along with the Nairobi National Park and Lang'ata Barracks, which housed the King's African Rifles during British colonial rule.

== Members of Parliament ==
Lang'ata Constituency is represented by Felix Odiwour, following the Kenyan general election of 2022. Before this, the constituency was represented in Parliament by Nixon Korir. The first Langata MP Joseph Murumbi served as a Vice-President of Kenya from 1966 to 1967. Former Langata MP Philip Leakey was the first white Kenyan MP.

Another noteworthy former Langata MP is Mwangi Mathai, the former husband of Nobel Peace Prize laureate Wangari Maathai.

Elections	MP	Party	Notes
1963	Joseph Murumbi	KANU	
1969	Yunis Ali	KANU	One-party system
1974	Mwangi Mathai	KANU	One-party system
1979	Philip Leakey	KANU	One-party system
1983	Philip Leakey	KANU	One-party system.
1988	Philip Leakey	KANU	One-party system.
1992	Raila Odinga	FORD-Kenya	
1997	Raila Odinga	NDP	
2002	Raila Odinga	NARC	
2002	Raila Odinga	LDP	
2007	Raila Odinga	ODM	
2013	Joash Olum	ODM	
2017	Nixon Kiprotich Korir	Jubilee	
2022	Felix Odiwour	ODM	

== Wards ==
Lang'ata Constituency is divided into five wards, each of which elects a representative to the Nairobi County Assembly.

Ward	Area (km²)	Population
Karen	48	24,507
Nairobi West	6.9	33,377
Mugumoini	126.4	47,037
South C	15.1	47,202
Nyayo Highrise	0.4	24,191
Total	196.8	176,314
2009 census.

== Lang'ata Sub-county ==
The Sub-county shares the same boundaries with the constituency. The sub-county is Deputy County Commissioner, working under the Ministry of Interior.
