= Kasarani Constituency =

Kenyan electoral constituency

Kasarani
- constituency for the Parliament of Kenya
- Kasarani Constituency within Nairobi City County

- Nairobi City County within Kenya
- County: Nairobi City
- Population: 780,656
- Area: 135.33 km^{2} (52.3 sq mi) or 86 km^{2} (33.2 sq mi)

Current constituency
- Created: 1963
- Number of members: One
- Party: Independent
- Member of Parliament: Ronald Karauri
- Wards: 5

Kasarani Constituency is an electoral constituency in Nairobi. It is one of seventeen constituencies of Nairobi City County. The entire constituency is located within Nairobi City County. It has an area of 152.60 km^{2} (58.9 sq mi), making it the second-largest constituency in Nairobi after Lang'ata. It borders Ruaraka, Embakasi Central, Embakasi North, Embakasi East, Roysambu constituencies to the west; Ruiru constituency to the north; Matungulu constituency to the east and Mavoko constituency to the south-east.

Kasarani Constituency forms part of two sub-counties; Kasarani Sub-county and Njiru Sub-county.

== History ==
The constituency was known as Nairobi Northeast Constituency at the 1963 elections and as Mathare Constituency from 1966 elections to 1994 by-elections. Up until the 2007 elections it has been known as Kasarani Constituency. Prior to the 2013 general election, Kasarani was divided into four constituencies: Kasarani, Roysambu Constituency, Ruaraka Constituency, and part of Embakasi North Constituency. Regions such as Kamulu, Njiru and Ruai, were hived off from the now defunct Embakasi Constituency and combined to the remaining part of Kasarani Constituency.

== Members of Parliament ==
Elections	MP	Party	Notes
1963	Munyua Waiyaki	KANU	
1969	Munyua Waiyaki	KANU	One-party system
1974	Munyua Waiyaki	KANU	One-party system
1979	Munyua Waiyaki	KANU	One-party system
1983	Andrew Ngumba	KANU	One-party system. Ngumba fled the country in 1986.
1986	Josephat Karanja	KANU	By-elections, One-party system
1988	Josephat Karanja	KANU	One-party system
1992	Muraya Macharia	FORD-Asili	
1994	Fredrick Masinde	Ford-Kenya	By-elections. Masinde died, resulting in another by-elections.
1994	Ochieng Mbeo	Ford-Kenya	By-elections (second one in 1994)
1997	Adolf Muchiri	NDP	
2002	William Omondi	NARC	
2007	Elizabeth Ongoro	ODM	
2013	John Njoroge Chege	TNA	
2017	Mercy Gakuya	Jubilee Party	
2022	Ronald Karauri	Independent Candidate	

== Wards ==
Ward	Population*	Area (km²)
Clay City	30,658	4.78
Mwiki	39,156	18.80
Kasarani	30,658	8.55
Njiru	64,551	5.20
Ruai	97,000	98.00
Total	262,023	135.33
2019 census.

== Kasarani Sub-county ==
The sub-county shares the same boundaries with what was known as Kasarani Division. Areas such as Njiru, Ruai and Kamulu are in Njiru Sub-county. The whole of Roysambu, Ruaraka, and part of Embakasi North constituencies are within the Kasarani sub-county. The Sub-county is headquartered in Kasarani, and headed by the Deputy County Commissioner, working under the Ministry of Interior.
