= Nairobi City County =

County of Kenya

- County
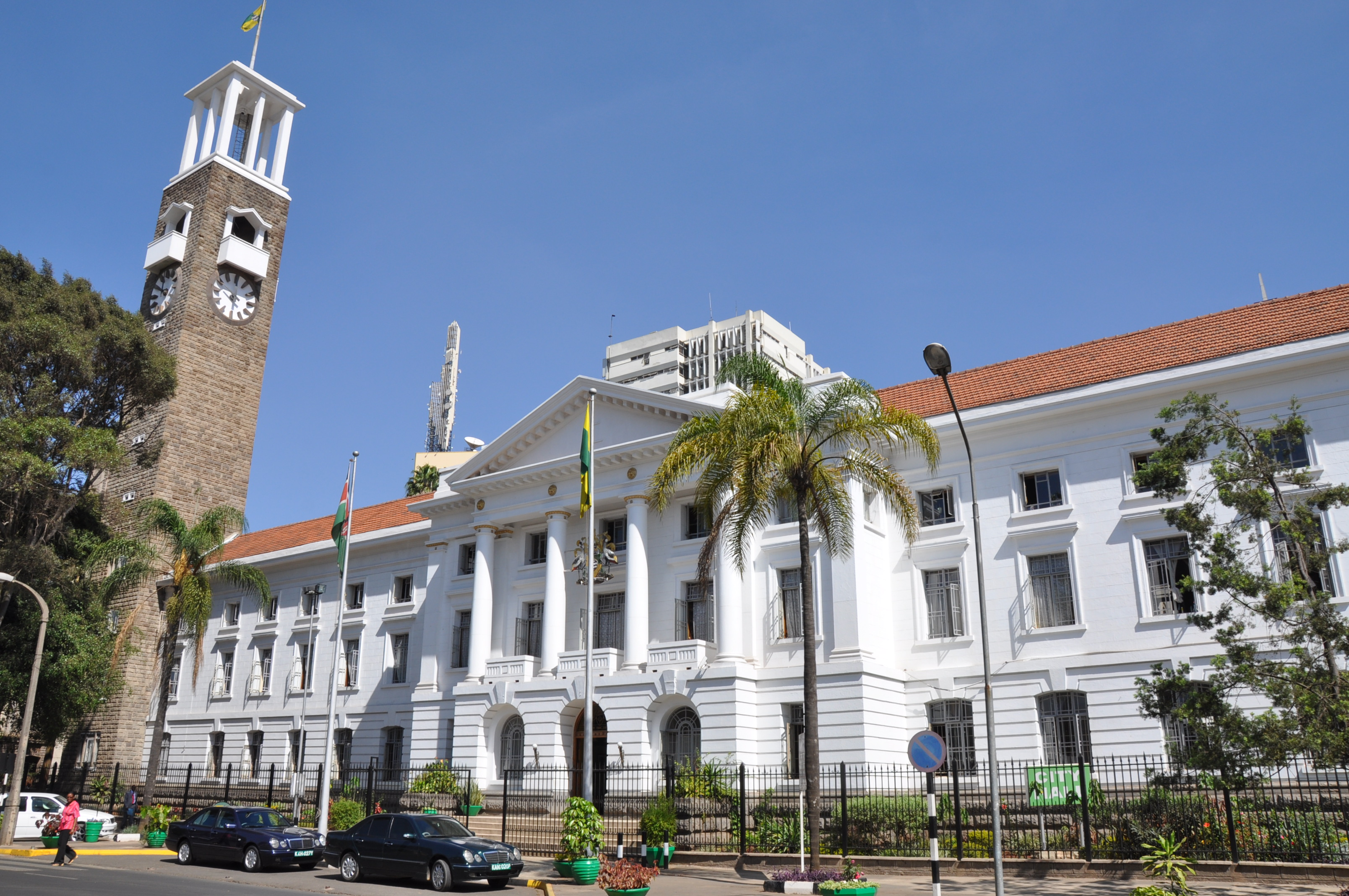
- Nairobi City Hall

- Flag Coat of arms

- Location in Kenya
- Coordinates: 1.2833°S 36.8167°E
- Country: Kenya
- Formed: 4 March 2013
- Capital: Nairobi
- Sub-counties: List: Dagoretti North; Dagoretti South; Embakasi North; Embakasi South; Embakasi Central; Embakasi East; Embakasi West; Kamukunji; Kasarani; Kibra; Lang'ata; Makadara; Mathare; Roysambu; Ruaraka; Starehe; Westlands

Government
  - Governor: Johnson Sakaja
  - Senator: Edwin Sifuna
  - County Woman Representative: Esther Passaris

Area
  - Total: 696.1 km^{2} (268.8 sq mi)
  - Rank: 45th
- Elevation: 1,795 m (5,889 ft)

Population (2019)
  - Total: 4,397,073
  - Rank: 1st
  - Density: 6,317/km^{2} (16,360/sq mi)
- Time zone: UTC+03:00 (EAT)
- HDI (2019): 0.681
- GCP (2023): 27.5% of Kenya's GDP
- Website: nairobi.go.ke

Nairobi City County is one of the 47 Counties of Kenya and serves as the capital of Kenya. It is the most populous county as of the 2019 census with a population of 4,397,073, yet among the smallest in area at 696.1 km².

Despite its small size, Nairobi County contributes approximately 27.5% of Kenya's Gross Domestic Product, making it the economic powerhouse of the nation. The county was established on 4 March 2013 under Kenya's new constitution, replacing the former Nairobi Province administrative unit. It comprises 17 constituencies and 85 electoral wards, with 11 gazetted sub-counties for administrative purposes.

== History ==
=== Foundation and early development (1899-1920) ===
Nairobi was founded in 1899 as a supply depot and railway camp for the Uganda Railway, which was being constructed by the British colonial administration to connect Mombasa on the Indian Ocean coast to Uganda. The site was selected for its central location between Mombasa and Kampala, and for its network of rivers that could supply water to the camp. The name "Nairobi" derives from the Maasai phrase Enkare Nyrobi, meaning "place of cool waters," referring to the Nairobi River that flows through the area.

The initial settlement consisted of tents and basic structures housing approximately 5,000 railway workers, including European engineers, indentured Indian labourers, and African porters. The area was previously inhabited by the Maasai people, Akamba people, and Kikuyu people, who were displaced by colonial authorities.

In 1900, an outbreak of bubonic plague necessitated the burning and rebuilding of the original settlement, leading to more organized urban planning. By 1905, Nairobi had grown sufficiently to replace Machakos (then known as Masaku) as the capital of the East Africa Protectorate. The railway headquarters moved from Mombasa to Nairobi in 1901, establishing the city as a critical transport and administrative hub.

=== Colonial era (1920-1963) ===
In 1919, Nairobi formally became a municipality as the Nairobi Municipal Council, with its boundaries extended to include surrounding settlements. The city attracted European settlers who were encouraged by British authorities to establish farms in the fertile highlands, with Nairobi serving as their commercial and administrative centre. Urban development during this period was characterized by racial segregation, with Europeans occupying the northern and western areas (approximately 80% of residential land despite being only 10% of the population), Asians in central commercial areas, and Africans confined to overcrowded eastern and southern sectors.

In 1950, the city celebrated 50 years of local government, and petitioned King George VI for city status. The petition was granted, and on 30 March 1950, Prince Henry, Duke of Gloucester presented the Royal Charter elevating Nairobi to city status. The Kenya government simultaneously presented the city with a ceremonial mace.

The Mau Mau Uprising (1952-1960) significantly impacted Nairobi. Although the conflict was primarily rural, the city became a centre for mass arrests of suspected Mau Mau supporters, particularly among the Kikuyu population. Operation Anvil in 1954 resulted in over 30,000 arrests in Nairobi alone, with 16,000 detained as active Mau Mau supporters.

=== Post-independence era (1963-2013) ===
Following Kenya's independence on 12 December 1963, Nairobi retained its status as the national capital. The city experienced rapid population growth driven by rural-to-urban migration, expanding from approximately 348,000 in 1965 to 531,000 by 1970. European residents largely departed, with their properties acquired by the new African elite and government officials.

The post-independence period saw continued spatial inequality, as the new ruling class largely maintained the colonial-era segregation patterns. Informal settlements proliferated in the eastern and southern parts of the city, including Kibera, which grew to become one of Africa's largest slums. Major developments included the establishment of the Kenyatta International Conference Centre (KICC) in 1973 and Jomo Kenyatta International Airport.

On 7 August 1998, the U.S. Embassy bombing by Al-Qaeda killed over 200 people in Nairobi and injured more than 5,000, marking one of the city's darkest moments.

In 2007, Nairobi hosted the World Social Forum, and the city continued to grow as East Africa's primary financial and diplomatic hub, hosting the regional headquarters of the United Nations Environment Programme (UNEP) and United Nations Office at Nairobi (UNON).

=== Devolution era (2013-present) ===
On 4 March 2013, under the new Kenyan Constitution promulgated in 2010, the Nairobi City Council was dissolved and replaced by Nairobi City County as part of Kenya's devolution into 47 counties. The first governor, Evans Kidero, was elected in March 2013, followed by Mike Sonko (2017-2020) and Johnson Sakaja (2022-present).

The devolution brought significant changes to governance structure, with increased autonomy for county administration and direct election of the governor. However, the transition also brought challenges, including conflicts between county and national government over control of key city functions.

== Geography ==
=== Location and terrain ===
Nairobi County lies approximately at latitude 1.2833°S, longitude 36.8167°E in the south-central part of Kenya. The terrain varies from gently rolling plains to steep valleys, particularly on the eastern and northern boundaries, with forested areas including parts of former forest reserves and green belts around the city.

The county borders:

- Kiambu County to the north and west
- Kajiado County to the south
- Machakos County to the east

Elevation is approximately 1,795 metres (5,889 feet) above sea level, contributing to a relatively mild climate compared with coastal or low-lying areas.

=== Climate ===
Nairobi has a subtropical highland climate (Köppen climate classification Cfb) with consistent moderate temperatures year-round. The average annual temperature is approximately 18.8 °C (65.8 °F), with February being the warmest month at around 21°C (69°F) and July the coolest at 17°C (62°F).

The county receives an average annual rainfall of approximately 674-698 mm (26.5-27.5 inches), with two distinct rainy seasons:

- Long rains: March to May, with April being the wettest month (average 125-136 mm)
- Short rains: October to December

The driest months are July and August, receiving approximately 17-32 mm of rainfall. The city enjoys an average of 2,465 hours of sunshine annually.

== Demographics ==
=== Population ===
According to the 2019 census conducted by the Kenya National Bureau of Statistics, Nairobi City County had a population of 4,397,073, making it the most populous county in Kenya. This represents a significant increase from the 2009 census figure of 3,138,369.

The county had 1,506,888 households in 2019, with an average household size of 2.9 persons, the smallest in Kenya. The population density was 6,247 people per km², the highest in the country.

==== Population by age (2019) ====
Age group	Female	Male	Total
0-5 years	305,599	309,302	614,901
6-14 years	366,313	355,035	721,348
15-35 years	1,097,131	989,864	2,086,995
36-60 years	393,782	491,395	885,177
61+ years	41,482	46,782	88,264

The data shows a predominantly youthful population, with 47.5% of residents aged between 15-35 years, reflecting Nairobi's role as an economic magnet attracting young workers from across Kenya.

=== Population by sub-county ===
Sub-county	Population (2019)	Area (km²)	Population density (per km²)
Embakasi	988,808	—	—
Kasarani	780,656	152.60	—
Langata	—	196.8	911
Westlands	—	72.4	—
Dagoretti	—	—	14,908
Mathare	—	3.0	68,942
Makadara	—	13.0	16,150
Kamukunji	—	12.0	25,455
Kibra	—	12.1	15,311

Embakasi was the most populous sub-county with 988,808 residents (22.5% of the county's population), while Mathare, the smallest sub-county at 3 km², had the highest population density of 68,942 people per km².

=== Religion ===
According to the 2019 census, Christianity is the predominant religion in Nairobi County:

Religion	Percentage
Christianity	89.0%
Islam	7.6%
Other religions	3.4%

Of the Christian population, the majority belong to Protestant and Evangelical churches, with significant Catholic and other Christian denominations also present.

== Government and politics ==
=== County government ===
The county government is headed by the Governor who is elected directly by voters and serves as the chief executive. The current governor is Johnson Arthur Sakaja, elected in August 2022. The governor appoints a deputy governor and a cabinet to oversee various county departments.

The Nairobi City County Assembly serves as the legislative body, headed by the County Speaker. Members of the County Assembly (MCAs) represent the 85 electoral wards, with additional nominated members for affirmative action purposes.

=== National representation ===
Nairobi County sends representatives to Kenya's national legislature:

- 17 Members of Parliament (one from each constituency) to the National Assembly
- 1 County Woman Representative (Esther Passaris) to the National Assembly
- 1 Senator (Simon Kipleting) to the Senate

== Administrative divisions ==
=== Constituencies and wards ===
Nairobi County is divided into 17 constituencies, which are further subdivided into 85 electoral wards:

Constituency	Number of wards	Sample wards
Westlands	5	Kitisuru, Parklands/Highridge, Kangemi, Mountain View, Karura
Dagoretti North	5	Kilimani, Kawangware, Gatina, Kileleshwa, Kabiro
Dagoretti South	5	Mutuini, Ngando, Riruta, Uthiru/Ruthimitu, Waithaka
Langata	5	Karen, Nairobi West, Mugumo-ini, South C, Nyayo Highrise
Kibra	5	Laini Saba, Lindi, Makina, Woodley/Kenyatta Golf, Sarangombe
Roysambu	5	Githurai, Kahawa West, Zimmerman, Roysambu, Kahawa
Kasarani	5	Clay City, Mwiki, Kasarani, Njiru, Ruai
Ruaraka	5	Babadogo, Utalii, Mathare North, Lucky Summer, Korogocho
Embakasi South	5	Imara Daima, Kwa Njenga, Kwa Reuben, Pipeline, Kware
Embakasi North	5	Kariobangi North, Dandora Area I-IV
Embakasi Central	5	Kayole North, Kayole Central, Kayole South, Komarock, Matopeni
Embakasi East	5	Upper Savanna, Lower Savanna, Embakasi, Utawala, Mihango
Embakasi West	5	Umoja I, Umoja II, Mowlem, Kariobangi South
Makadara	5	Maringo/Hamza, Viwandani, Harambee, Makongeni, South B
Kamukunji	5	Pumwani, Eastleigh North, Eastleigh South, Airbase, California
Starehe	5	Landimawe, Nairobi Central, Ngara, Pangani, Ziwani/Kariokor
Mathare	5	Hospital, Mabatini, Huruma, Ngei, Mlango Kubwa

== Economy ==
=== Overview ===
Nairobi County is Kenya's economic powerhouse, contributing approximately 27.5% of the national Gross Domestic Product (GDP) as of 2023. The county's Gross County Product (GCP) was estimated at KSh 3.8 trillion in 2023, with a GCP per capita of KSh 802,344 (approximately USD 6,300), the highest in Kenya and more than three times the national GDP per capita of KSh 264,077.

The county dominates in three key economic sectors:

- Manufacturing: 37% of national production
- Services: 37.3% of national production
- Construction: Major contributor

Nairobi also hosts the Nairobi Securities Exchange (NSE), one of Africa's largest stock exchanges and the fourth-largest by trading volume on the continent.

=== Key economic sectors ===
==== Financial services ====
Nairobi serves as East Africa's financial hub, hosting:

- Headquarters of major Kenyan and multinational banks
- Insurance companies and investment firms
- The Nairobi Securities Exchange
- Regional offices of international financial institutions

==== Information and communications technology ====
The ICT sector has experienced rapid growth, driven by:

- High mobile phone penetration
- Growth in fintech (mobile money services like M-Pesa)
- Software development and business process outsourcing
- Tech startups and innovation hubs

==== Manufacturing ====
The county hosts diverse manufacturing activities:

- Food processing and beverages
- Pharmaceuticals
- Textiles and garments
- Construction materials
- Consumer goods

==== Tourism and hospitality ====
Although tourism accounts for a smaller percentage of the economy, Nairobi serves as:

- Gateway to Kenya's safari destinations
- Home to Nairobi National Park, the only national park within a capital city
- Host to numerous hotels, restaurants, and conference facilities
- Business tourism hub

==== Trade and commerce ====
- Wholesale and retail trade
- Import and export activities
- Distribution centres for regional trade

=== Employment ===
The unemployment rate in Nairobi was estimated at 5.5% in 2019, primarily concentrated in high-density, low-income areas. The formal sector employs workers in government, private companies, and international organizations, while the informal sector (jua kali) provides livelihoods for a significant portion of the population.

== Infrastructure ==
=== Transport ===
==== Air ====
- Jomo Kenyatta International Airport (JKIA) - Kenya's largest and busiest airport, located in Embakasi East
- Wilson Airport - Handles domestic flights and small aircraft

==== Road ====
Major highways include:

- Thika Superhighway - Connects Nairobi to Thika and Mount Kenya region
- Mombasa Road - Links to Mombasa and the coast
- Nairobi-Nakuru Highway - Connects to western Kenya
- Nairobi Expressway - Elevated toll highway completed in 2022 to reduce congestion

==== Rail ====
- Nairobi Railway Station - Serves the historic railway network
- Standard Gauge Railway (SGR)- Modern railway connecting Nairobi to Mombasa and Naivasha

==== Public transport ====
- Matatus - Privately owned minibuses
- Buses - Including Bus Rapid Transit systems
- Boda-boda - Motorcycle taxis
- Ride-hailing services (Uber, Bolt, Little Cab)

=== Utilities ===
==== Water supply ====
- Nairobi City Water and Sewerage Company provides water and sanitation services
- Water sourced from Sasumua Dam, Ndakaini Dam, and other reservoirs

==== Electricity ====
- Supplied primarily by Kenya Power
- Most areas have access to the national electricity grid

==== Telecommunications ====
- High mobile phone penetration
- Multiple telecommunications providers (Safaricom, Airtel Kenya, Telkom Kenya)
- Expanding fibre optic and 4G/5G networks

=== Healthcare ===
The county has numerous healthcare facilities:

- Kenyatta National Hospital - Kenya's largest referral and teaching hospital
- Nairobi Hospital - Major private hospital
- County hospitals and health centres in each sub-county
- Numerous private clinics and diagnostic centres

=== Education ===
Nairobi hosts major educational institutions:

- University of Nairobi - Kenya's oldest university
- Kenyatta University - Located in Kasarani
- Strathmore University
- United States International University Africa
- Kenya Methodist University
- Numerous primary and secondary schools, both public and private

== Culture and society ==
=== Nicknames ===
Nairobi has two popular nicknames:

- The Green City in the Sun - Derived from the city's abundant foliage and pleasant climate
- Safari Capital of the World - Due to its role as a gateway to Kenya's wildlife tourism

=== Languages ===
While Swahili and English are the official languages, Nairobi's diverse population speaks numerous indigenous languages including Kikuyu, Luo, Kalenjin, Kamba, and many others. A unique urban dialect known as Sheng has developed, mixing Swahili, English, and indigenous languages.

=== Notable features ===
- Nairobi National Park - The only national park within a capital city worldwide
- Nairobi National Museum
- Karen Blixen Museum
- Giraffe Centre
- Bomas of Kenya
- Uhuru Park and Central Park

== Postal codes ==
Nairobi is served by multiple post offices operated by Posta Kenya. The General Post Office (GPO) on Haile Selassie Avenue in the Central Business District uses the postal code 00100, which is also commonly used as the general code for Nairobi. Other post offices and delivery areas have their own codes, such as 00200 and 00500.

== Challenges ==
Despite its economic success, Nairobi County faces several challenges:

- Housing shortage - Rapid urbanisation has led to inadequate affordable housing, resulting in the growth of informal settlements
- Traffic congestion - Particularly on major roads during peak hours
- Waste management - Insufficient collection and disposal infrastructure
- Water supply - Intermittent supply in some areas
- Income inequality - Stark disparities between wealthy suburbs and informal settlements
- Crime and security - Urban crime remains a concern in certain areas

== See also ==
- Nairobi
- Counties of Kenya
- List of counties of Kenya by GDP
- Posta Kenya
- Nairobi Securities Exchange
