= Nairobi railway station =

Railway Station in Nairobi

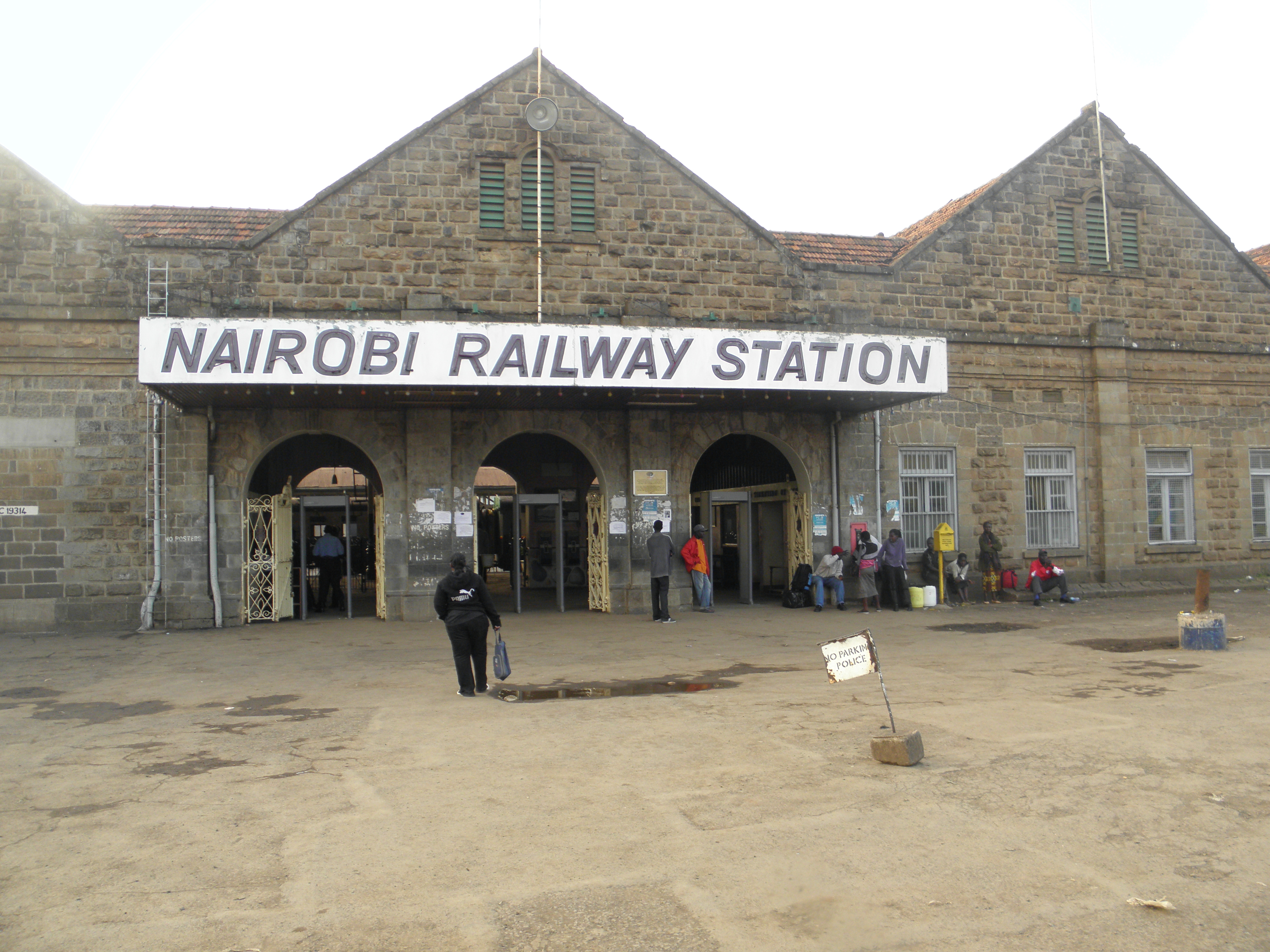

General information
- Coordinates: 1.291664°S 36.828619°E
- System: Heavy rail / freight
- Line: Uganda Railway

History
- Opened: 1899

Services
Preceding station	Kenya Railways	Following station
Terminus	Embakasi route	Makadara towards Embakasi Village
Terminus	Syokimau route	Makadara towards Syokimau
Terminus	Lukenya route	Makadara towards Lukenya
Terminus	Ruiru route	Makadara towards Ruiru
Kibera towards Limuru	Limuru route	Terminus

Former services
Preceding station	Kenya Railways	Following station
Kikuyu, Kenya towards Kisumu	Uganda Railway	Athi River towards Mombasa
Location

Nairobi railway station is a railway station located in Nairobi, Kenya. The station is on the metre gauge Uganda Railway, and previously provided services to Mombasa three times per week. However, in 2017, the new Mombasa-Nairobi Standard Gauge Railway took over services to Mombasa, starting from a new Nairobi Terminus in Syokimau, 20km from Nairobi CBD.

== History ==
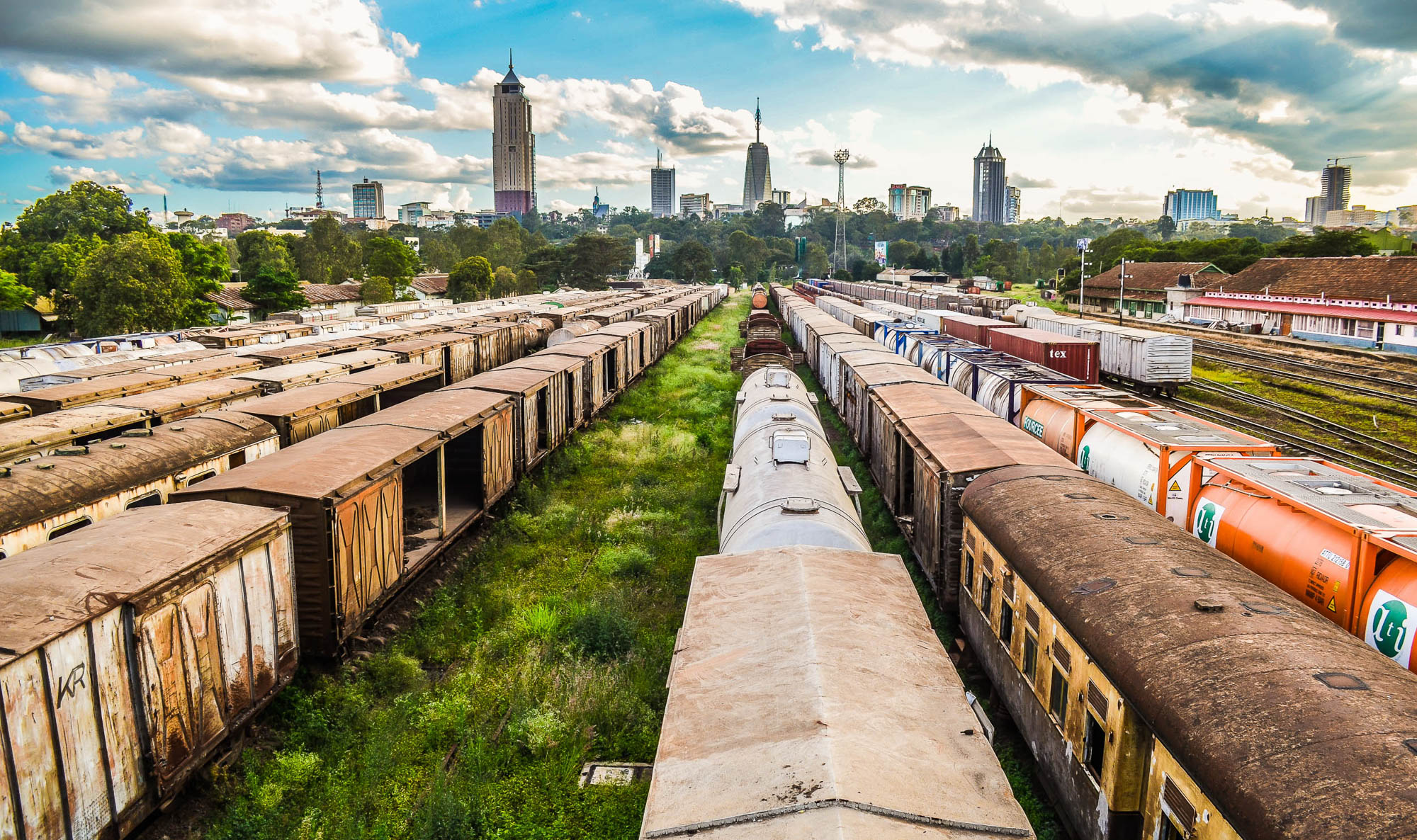
Trains at the former railway station

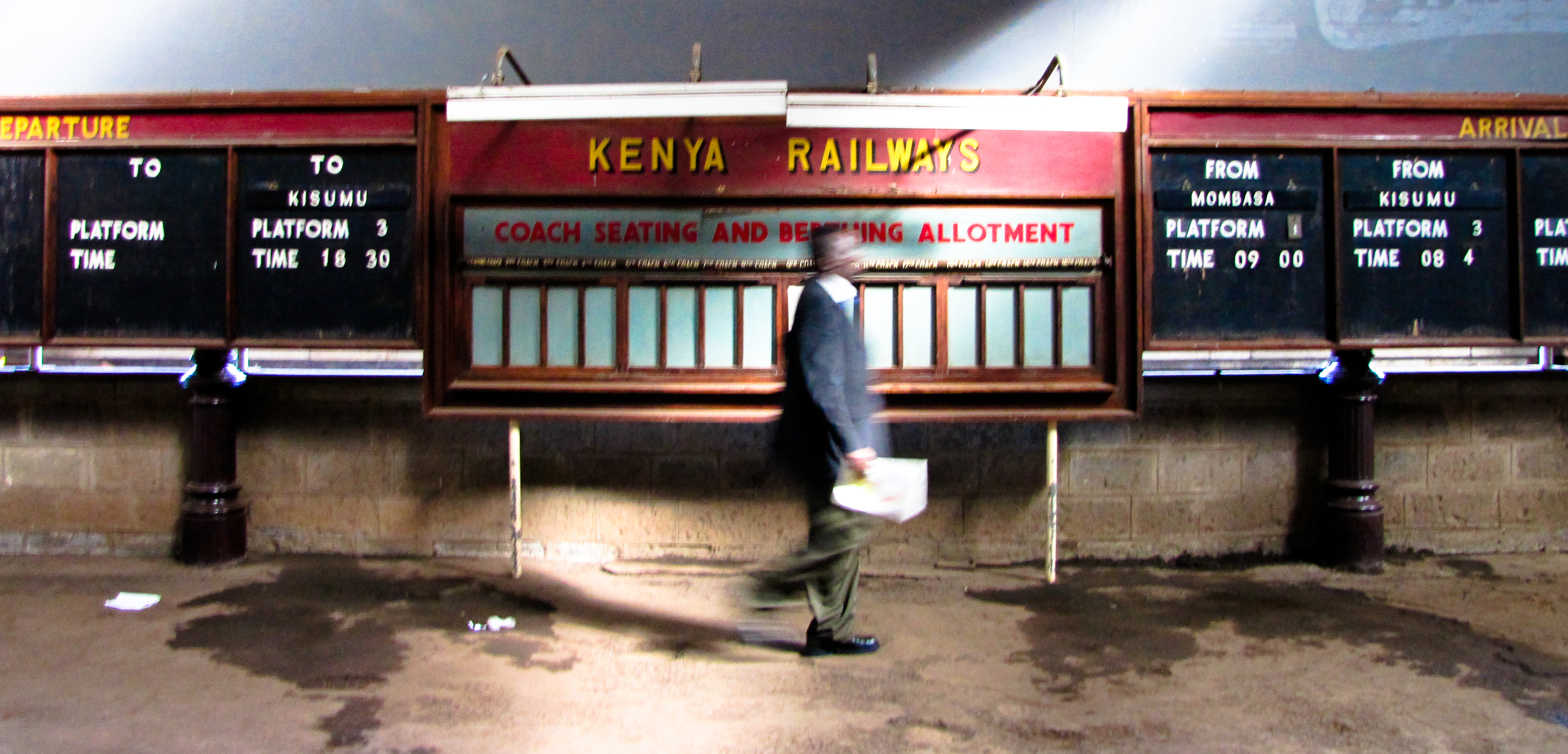
Kenya Railways in 2011

The station, built in 1899, was essentially the site from where the city of Nairobi grew throughout the 20th century.

It is on the site of the first stone building in Nairobi in 1904, which was a Catholic church. That church now meets at the Cathedral Basilica of the Holy Family.

The city initially developed on the north side of the tracks, while the southern part of the railway area, slighly larger than the current CBD, has remained underutilized, mainly occupied by workshops and low-rise staff quarters.

When the railway connection between Kenya and Tanzania closed in 2006, rail services ceased to operate between the two countries. A bus route, however, provides international transport between Nairobi and Arusha, the journey taking approximately five hours.

In 2012, the Kenyan government opened a new metro rail service from Nairobi station to the suburb of Syokimau. Syokimau will get a few trains every day, although there was criticism that a ticket would cost more than the average daily wage.

== Nairobi Railway City ==
A plan to develop the southern side of the tracks into an expansion of the CBD was first mooted in 2012, but abandoned, then revived again in 2016.

The proposed urban development project includes the transformation of Nairobi Railway Station into a modern, high-capacity multimodal interchange, surrounded by a vastly expanded central business district.

== Museum ==
In 1971, the East African Railways and Harbours Corporation established the Nairobi Railway Museum to preserve and display the history of rail travel in East Africa. The museum is connected to the main line by rail, allowing steam excursions on restored locomotives.
