= Rail transport in Kenya =

Rail transport in Kenya consists of a metre-gauge network and a new standard-gauge railway (SGR). Both railways connect Kenya's main port city of Mombasa to the interior, running through the national capital of Nairobi. The metre-gauge network runs to the Ugandan border, and the Mombasa–Nairobi Standard Gauge Railway, financed by a Chinese loan, reaches Suswa.

== Network ==
- Narrow gauge: 2,778 km 1,000 mm (3 ft 3 3/8 in) gauge, some lines abandoned
- Standard gauge: 605 km 1,435 mm (4 ft 8 1/2 in)
  - Mombasa–Nairobi Standard Gauge Railway (SGR)
  - SGR extension to Naivasha

=== Specifications ===
The loading gauge for new standard gauge railways in Africa is width: 3,400 mm (11 ft 2 in) the same as the original Shinkansen in Japan; also Korea and China. Allows for 2+3 seating.
platform train gap:
platform height:
carriage floor height:

- Minimum curve radius, see Minimum railway curve radius

=== Railway links with adjacent countries ===
- Ethiopia – no
- Somalia – no railways
- South Sudan – no – proposed link to Juba (2005) break-of-gauge 1,000 mm (3 ft 3 3/8 in)/1,067 mm (3 ft 6 in)
- Tanzania – same 1,000 mm (3 ft 3 3/8 in) gauge – abandoned
- Uganda – yes – same gauge – 1,000 mm (3 ft 3 3/8 in)
- The Mombasa–Nairobi Standard Gauge Railway will be extended to the Uganda border, connecting with a standard gauge railway in Uganda.

=== Passenger services ===
Passenger service between Mombasa and Nairobi is available on the Mombasa–Nairobi Standard Gauge Railway. A metre-gauge commuter train (Nairobi Commuter Rail) connects the new SGR Nairobi Terminus to the old station in Nairobi city center.

== History ==
The Uganda Railway was originally built by the British to provide Uganda with access to the sea. Construction began at Mombasa in 1896 and reached Lake Victoria in 1901. The line was in part nicknamed the Lunatic Line after Henry Labouchère, a member of the British parliament, gave a mocking reply to the current British Foreign Minister support for the project in the form of a poem:

What it will cost no words can express,
What is its object no brain can suppose,
Where it will start from no one can guess,
Where it is going to nobody knows,
What is the use of it none can conjecture,
What it will carry there's none can define,
And in spite of George Curzon's superior lecture,
It clearly is naught but a lunatic line.

And partly because of the difficulties encountered during its construction, including man-eating lions that ate about 30 workers before they were finally hunted down and flesh eating maggots. In 1929, the Uganda Railway was merged into Kenya and Uganda Railways and Harbours, which was then merged into East African Railways and Harbours Corporation (EAR&H) in 1948. EAR&H operated transportation links for Kenya, Uganda, and Tanzania until the East African Community was dissolved. Kenya's portion of the railway became the Kenya Railways Corporation. Over the next 30 years, Kenya's railway network deteriorated from a lack of maintenance. By 2017, only half of Kenya's metre-gauge railways remained in operation.

In November 2006, the Rift Valley Railways Consortium took over the operation of railways in Kenya and Uganda under a 25-year concession. However, RVR was unable to turnaround railway operations, hampered by corrupt management and aging infrastructure. In 2017, the World Bank found that a $22 million loan extended for the purchase of refurbished locomotives had been diverted into a shell company controlled by RVR executives. The Uganda Railways Corporation issued a notice of default to RVR in 2016, and the Kenya Railways Corporation terminated the concession in April 2017.

In 2011, Kenya signed a memorandum of understanding with the China Road and Bridge Corporation to build the Mombasa–Nairobi Standard Gauge Railway (SGR). Financing for the US$3.6 billion project was finalised in May 2014, with the Exim Bank of China extending a loan for 90% of the project cost, and the remaining 10% coming from the Kenyan government. Passenger service on the SGR was inaugurated on 31 May 2017. Work to extend the SGR to Suswa is complete.

== Map ==
- Map: UN Map

== See also ==
- East African Railway Master Plan
- Kenya
- Transport in Kenya
- Rail transport in Uganda
- AIHSRN
