= Nairobi Railway City =

Urban redevelopment project

Nairobi Railway City is an urban redevelopment project centred on Nairobi Railway Station in Nairobi Central Business District, Kenya. It covers about 177 hectares and is planned as an expansion of the CBD on centrally located, mostly underutilized railway land.

== History and development ==
The project was first mooted in 2012 under president Mwai Kibaki, but was abandoned. Kenya Railways revived the project in 2016.

The project later became part of the Kenya-United Kingdom strategic partnership, with British engineering firm Atkins appointed to design the new central station and public spaces. The project broke ground in December 2022.

In October 2026, Kenya Railways announced preparations to hand over the central station site for construction, and the subsequent relocation of matatu services.

== Planned facilities ==
The new station is planned to integrate commuter rail and bus rapid transit. A direct railway connection between central Nairobi and Jomo Kenyatta International Airport, is planned in partnership with a French consortium.

A proposed 10,000-seat indoor arena for concerts, sporting events, conferences and exhibitions was announced in April 2026, to be located in the dedicated Meetings, Incentives, Conferences and Exhibitions (MICE) precinct.
