= Nairobi Commuter Rail =

Overview
- Stations: 22

Service
- Type: Commuter rail
- Services: 5
- Operator: Kenya Railways Corporation
- Daily ridership: 7354

Technical
- Track length: 165 km (102.53 mi)
- Num of tracks: Double track between Makadara and Nairobi, single track elsewhere
- Track gauge: 1,000 mm (3 ft 3 3/8 in) metre gauge

The Nairobi Commuter Rail (NCR) is a rail network serving Nairobi and its suburbs. It has five lines and 22 stations. In the first six months of 2023, the service was used by 7354 passengers daily.

After undergoing modernization, the NCR was inaugurated on 10 November 2020 by then president Uhuru Kenyatta.

On 15 December 2023, president William Ruto launched construction of the new Riruta–Ngong line that will run through Riruta, Karen, Bulbul and Ngong stations, to be built by China Road and Bridge Corporation (CRBC). The second phase will extend this line to Kiserian, and the third phase will extend it to Ongata Rongai.

There are plans to extend the Nairobi–Embakasi Village line to Ruai and the Nairobi–Syokimau line to Jomo Kenyatta International Airport.

== Existing Lines ==
| Line | Services per day (both directions) | Average daily ridership (2023H1) |
|---|---|---|
| Nairobi–Embakasi Village | 15 | 1994 |
| Nairobi–Syokimau | 12 (Note: One service (at night) starts at Nairobi Terminus.) | 1465 |
| Nairobi–Limuru | 2 | 920 |
| Nairobi–Lukenya | 2 | 354 |
| Nairobi–Ruiru | 4 (Note: Two services start/end at Kahawa West.) | 2622 |

== Rolling stock ==
In April 2020 Kenya Railways acquired 11 refurbished diesel multiple units from Serveis Ferroviaris de Mallorca. These trains were built between 1994 and 2003 by CAF as Serie 61 de SFM and were running on the metre gauge railway network on the Spanish island of Mallorca.

== Future Lines ==
- Riruta–Lenana–Ngong Line
- Nairobi–Nyayo–Kibera–Talanta Line

== See also ==
- Nairobi Light Rail
