= Prophetess Syokimau =

Kenyan medicine woman and prophetess

Syokimau was a Kamba medicine woman and prophetess who lived in the 1800s long before Kenya became a colony. She was born and lived in Iveti Hills near the today's Machakos town. It is claimed that Syokimau could predict impeding attacks from other communities such as the Maasai and Gikuyu giving Kamba warriors ample time to prepare for the defense.

== Overview ==
Syokimau is credited as the greatest prophetess among the Kamba people because she foretold the coming of the white men and the construction of the railway line. In her vision, she saw a long snake belching fire and smoke as it moved from waters to another waters. In it there were people with skin like meat who spoke unintelligibly like birds and carried fire in their pockets. Her prophecy came to pass in the 20th century after the completion of the Kenya-Uganda Railway that ran from Mombasa to Kisumu, the lakeside city then known as Port Florence. The people she saw were white people who spoke English and carried matchboxes in their pockets.

== Legacy ==
Syokimau, a fast-growing residential area in Machakos County that is close to Jomo Kenyatta International Airport and where Syokimau Railway Station and the Mombasa-Nairobi Standard Gauge Railway Nairobi Terminus are located, is named after her. Some sources claim that Syonguu wa Kathukya, a later prophetess from around Athi River renamed her territory after Syokimau because she was impressed by her work. That is how the popular residential area came to bear the name of the prophetess.
