= Athi river =

Athi river may refer to:

- Athi-Galana-Sabaki River
- Athi River (town)
- Athi River Super Bridge
