= Magadi Soda Company =

Kenyan chemical company

- Type: Subsidiary
- Industry: Minerals
- Founded: 1911; 115 years ago
- Headquarters: Magadi, Kajiado County, Kenya
- Products: Soda ash
- Parent: Tata Chemicals

The Magadi Soda Company, now operating as Tata Chemicals Magadi Limited, is a Kenyan-based enterprise founded in 1911 that specializes in the extraction of trona deposits from Lake Magadi in the Rift Valley and the production of natural soda ash, positioning it as Africa's largest manufacturer of this key industrial chemical and one of Kenya's leading exporters.

Lake Magadi has one of the purest surface deposits of trona. The trona is converted by Magadi to soda ash, at a facility near the mining operations, and the soda ash is transported by rail to Mombasa for onward shipping.

== Transport ==
The company operates a railway branchline linking with the main Kenyan Railway System.

== Tata Chemicals Magadi History ==
The business began in 1911 as Magadi Soda Company and later became part of Brunner Mond, a British chemicals company.

Brunner Mond subsequently became part of Imperial Chemical Industries, commonly known as ICI, before the Kenyan soda ash business eventually returned to the Brunner Mond structure.

Tata Chemicals acquired Brunner Mond Group in December 2005, bringing the Magadi operation into the Tata Chemicals family.

In 2011, the Kenyan operation was renamed to Tata Chemicals Magadi Limited, the same year it celebrated 100 years of soda ash production.

Today, the company is one of the major international operations and employs more than 600 people.

Historical Tata records show that the operation employed about 680 people when it marked its centenary in 2011.

At that time, the company reported annual soda ash production of about 600,000 tonnes and described Magadi as a significant foreign-exchange earner for Kenya.

== See also ==
- Titus Naikuni
- Tata Chemicals
- Tata Group
