= Titus Naikuni =

Kenyan businessman

- Born: 1953 (age 72–73); Kenya
- Education: University of Nairobi (Bachelor of Science in mechanical engineering); Harvard Business School; Management Development Programme; Jomo Kenyatta University of Agriculture and Technology (Honorary Doctor of Science)
- Occupations: Engineer, businessman, corporate executive
- Years active: 1999–present
- Title: chairman Airtel Kenya

Titus Naikuni is a mechanical engineer, businessman and corporate executive in Kenya. He is the chairman of the board of Airtel Kenya and Rift Valley Railways.

Previously, from February 2003 until December 2014, Naikuni served as the group managing director and chief executive officer of Kenya Airways, the national airline carrier.

== Background and education ==
He was born in Kenya, circa 1961. He attended University of Nairobi, graduating with a Bachelor of Science in mechanical engineering. Later, he attended the Harvard Business School’s Management Development Programme (PMD71), in Cambridge, Massachusetts, US. He also holds an honorary doctorate in science that was awarded to him by the Jomo Kenyatta University of Agriculture and Technology, in recognition of his contribution to development.

== Career ==
He joined the Magadi Soda Company in 1979 as a trainee engineer and rose to the positions of managing director of that company in 1995 and managing director of the Magadi Railway Company (a subsidiary of Magadi Soda Company) in 1996.

Between August 1999 and March 2001, Naikuni was a member of a team of Kenyan technocrats, sponsored by the World Bank, who was known as the "Dream Team". These technocrats were engaged by the government to turn around the economy. In this capacity, Naikuni served as permanent secretary in the Ministry of Transport and Communications and was a member of the board of Kenya Airways.

He returned to Magadi Soda Company in April 2001, where he continued to serve as managing director, until his appointment to Kenya Airways in February 2003. Naikuni has extensive boardroom experience, having served on various company boards, including as a member of the board of Brunner Mond (South Africa), as chairman of Kenya Power and Lighting Company and as chairman of Housing Finance Company Limited. He received the Manager of the Year Award in Kenya in 2002.

Naikuni also served as the founding Chancellor of South Eastern Kenya University(SEKU)

== Other responsibilities ==
As of February 2016, Naikuni served on the boards of eight companies, including the following:

- AccessKenya Limited
- Airtel Kenya
- Lafarge International Advisory Board
- Servair France
- Tata Chemicals Magadi
- Prudential Life Assurance Kenya
- Rift Valley Railways

== See also ==
- Kenya Airways
