= Mombasa Terminus =

Railway station in Mombasa, Kenya

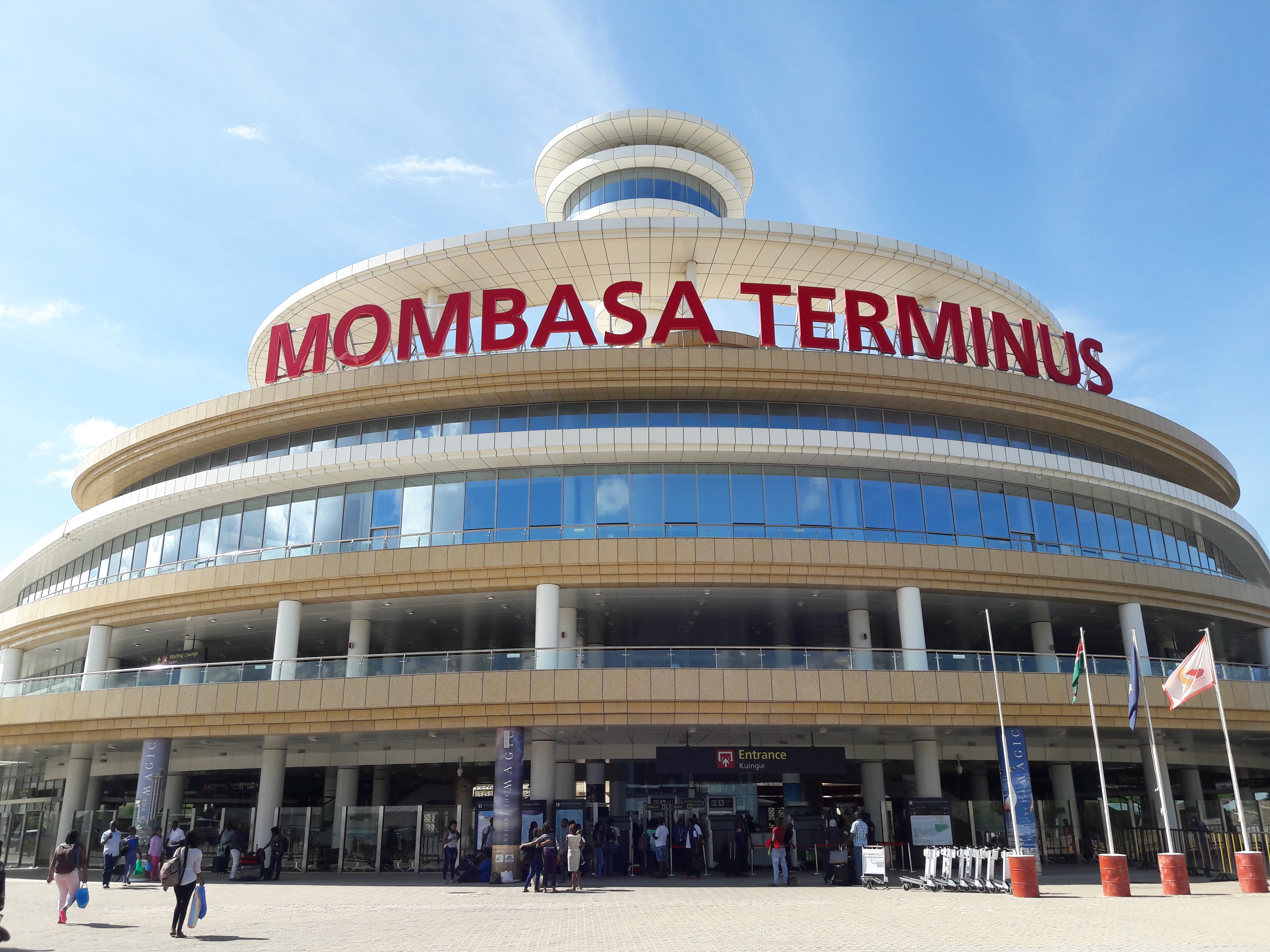

General information
- Coordinates: 4.02178°S 39.57947°E
- System: Heavy rail / freight
- Operator: Kenya Railways Corporation
- Line: Mombasa–Nairobi Standard Gauge Railway

History
- Opened: 2017

Services
Preceding station	Kenya Railways	Following station
Mariakani towards Nairobi Terminus	Mombasa–Nairobi Standard Gauge Railway Inter-county	Terminus
Voi towards Nairobi Terminus	Mombasa–Nairobi Standard Gauge Railway Express	Terminus
Nairobi Terminus Terminus	Mombasa–Nairobi Standard Gauge Railway Night	Terminus
Location

Mombasa Terminus is a terminus of the Mombasa–Nairobi Standard Gauge Railway in Kenya located in Miritini, a suburb of Mombasa. The station building is made up of concentric circles and a central tower, representing a ripple in the ocean.

Three passenger trains leave the station every day eastbound, an inter-county train that stops at all stations and two express trains to Nairobi Terminus. 5 leave eastbound to central Mombasa.
