= Athi River Super Bridge =

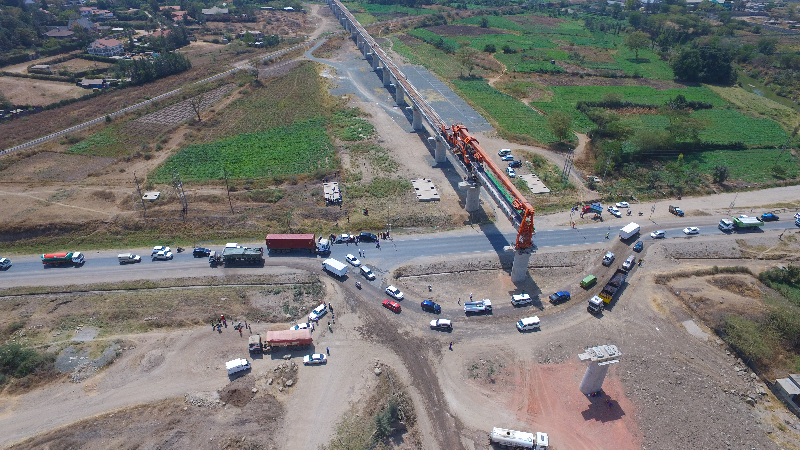
- Athi River Super Bridge during construction, September 2016
- Coordinates: 1°26′36.05″S 36°58′5.9″E
- Carries: Mombasa–Nairobi Standard Gauge Railway
- Crosses: Athi River
- Maintained by: Kenya Railways Corporation

Characteristics
- Design: Beam bridge
- Total length: 2,785 metres (9,137 ft; 1.731 mi)
- Width: 5.5 metres (18 ft)
- Height: 20 metres (66 ft) (pylons)
- Longest span: 18 metres (59 ft)
- Clearance above: 18m
- Clearance below: 25 metres (82 ft)

History
- Construction start: 2015
- Construction end: 5 November 2016
- Opened: 1 June 2017

Statistics
- Daily traffic: Railway

The Athi River Super Bridge is the longest bridge on the Mombasa–Nairobi Standard Gauge Railway (SGR). It was built to carry a single-track railway line over the Athi River as it approaches the Kenyan capital city of Nairobi. At the time of its construction, the 2.6 km (1.6 mi) bridge was the sixth-longest bridge in Africa and the second-longest railway bridge, exceeded only by the Dona Ana Bridge at 3.67 km (2.28 mi).

The bridge's length was necessary to avoid cutting through the town of Athi River. A direct crossing would have required the destruction of many residences or a major industrial zone. To avoid built-up areas, the Standard Gauge Railway turns to skirt the eastern side of the town. The Super Bridge crosses the meandering Athi River three times, running through undeveloped land in the river's flood plain.

== Photos ==
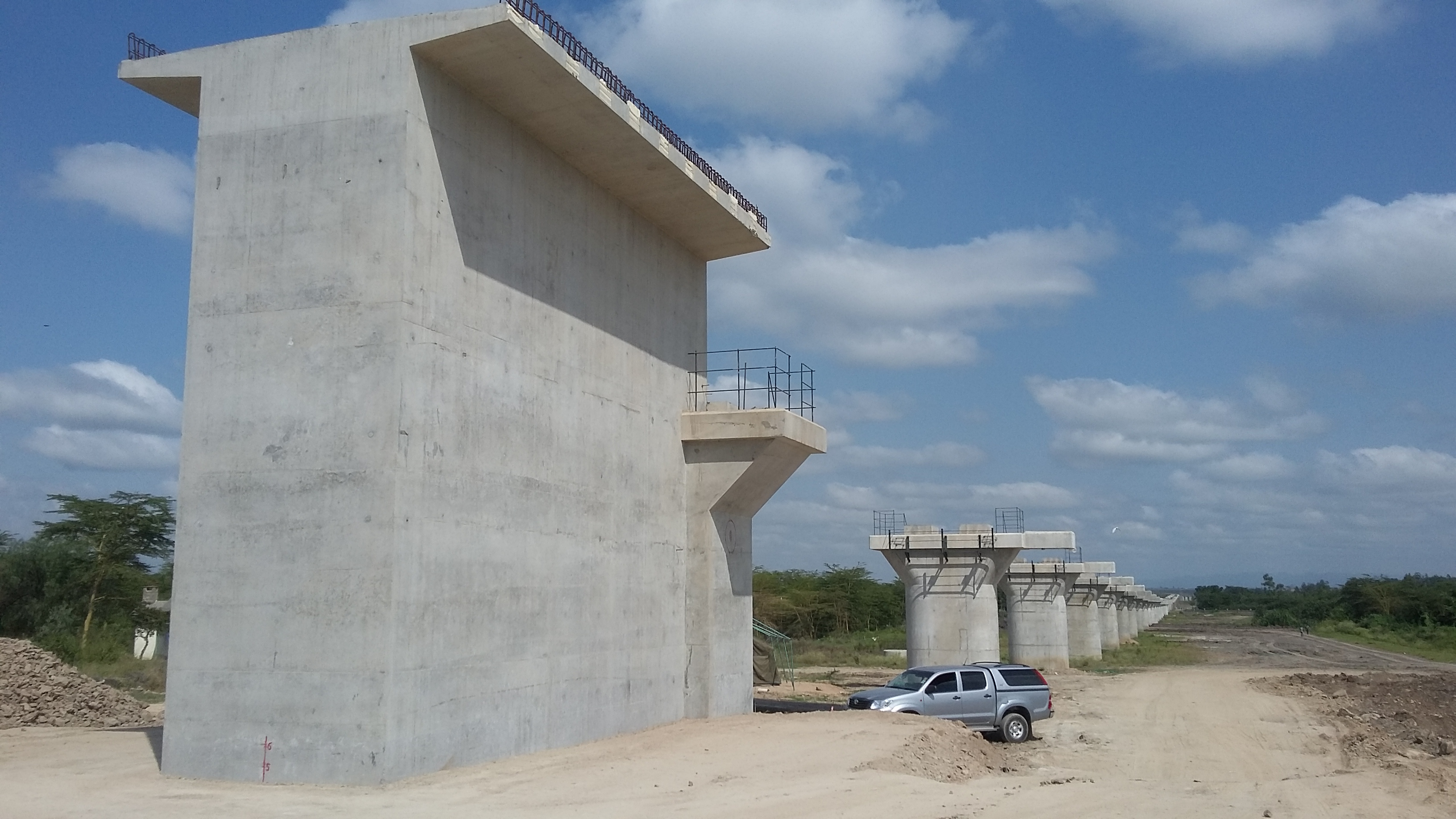
Athi River Super Bridge during construction, June 2016

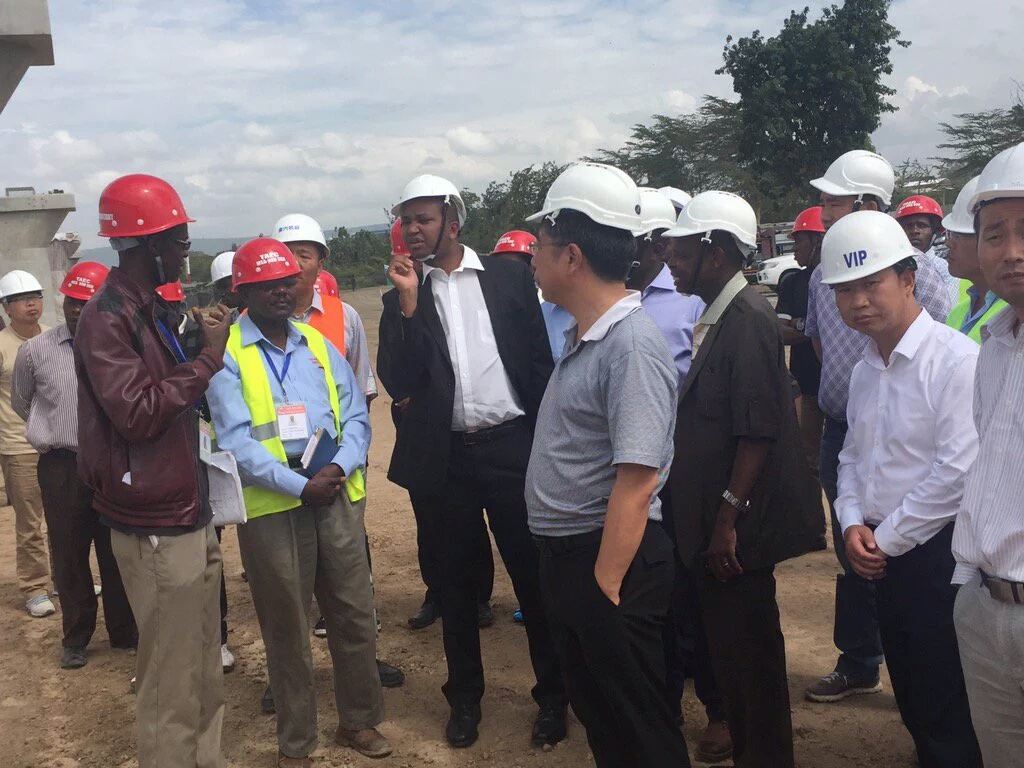
Launching of the bridge by the minister Andrew Nyakera
