= Nairobi Light Rail =

The Nairobi Light Rail system was announced in 2016.

A financing deal was signed with France in 2019. the project was expected to be complete by 2021, but construction did not commence.

== Lines ==
The first stage would have been a connection between the main station of the existing narrow gauge line.

== Stations and stops ==
- Thika Road
- Ngong Road
- Ongata Rongai
- Limuru Road

== See also ==
- Nairobi rail service
- Railway stations in Kenya
- Mass Rapid Transit System
