= Syokimau =

- Location in Kenya
- Coordinates: 1.360°S 36.938°E
- Country: Kenya
- County: Machakos County
- Time zone: UTC+3 (EAT)

Syokimau is a residential area in the west of Machakos County, Kenya, just south of Nairobi and Jomo Kenyatta International Airport.

The place is named after the legendary Akamba medicine woman Prophetess Syokimau. Syokimau Prophesied the coming of the white people to Kenya and also prophesied the construction of the Mombasa to Kisumu railway line. In her prophecy she said she could see people of a different colour emanating from kisuani, the modern day port of Mombasa and carrying fire in their pockets which was later to be understood as white people in vessels carrying matchboxes and guns. She prophesied seeing a long snake, whose head was in the Indian Ocean and the tail was in Lake Victoria.

Administratively, most of Syokimau falls within Syokimau/Mlolongo ward in Mavoko Constituency of Machakos County.

== Transport ==
In November 2012, the Kenyan government officially opened a new metro rail service station in Syokimau, with a service leading to the Nairobi railway station and the Central Business District. Syokimau is served by two trains to Nairobi town in the morning, with two trains back in the evening every weekday.

Syokimau is also the location of the Nairobi Terminus railway station, the main station for Nairobi on the Mombasa-Nairobi Standard Gauge Railway. The new station is being built next to the existing Syokimau station, which allows passengers to transfer from standard gauge trains to metre gauge trains to reach the Nairobi city centre.

== Air pollution ==
Syokimau has suffered significant air pollution from industrial activity. As of 2019, a concerted campaign to demand clean air has resulted in a reduction in air pollution.

== See also ==
- Railway stations in Kenya
