= Tata Chemicals =

Indian company

Tata Chemicals Limited
- Type: Public
- Traded as: BSE: 500770; NSE: TATACHEM
- Industry: Chemicals
- Founded: 1939; 87 years ago
- Headquarters: Mumbai, Maharashtra, India
- Area served: Global
- Key people: Natarajan Chandrasekaran (Chairman); Ramakrishnan Mukundan (MD & CEO)
- Products: Basic and industrial chemicals, nitrogenous and phosphatic fertilizers, industrial refinishing products, coatings and crop nutritions;
- Revenue: ▲₹15,707 crore (US$1.6 billion) (2024)
- Operating income: ▲₹1,623 crore (US$170 million) (2024)
- Net income: ▲₹435 crore (US$45 million) (2024)
- Total assets: ▲₹36,756 crore (US$3.8 billion) (2024)
- Total equity: ▲₹23,114 crore (US$2.4 billion) (2024)
- Parent: Tata Group
- Subsidiaries: Tata Chemicals Europe; British Salt; Tata Swach; Magadi Soda Company; Rallis India
- Website: www.tatachemicals.com

Tata Chemicals Limited is an Indian multinational corporation with interests in chemicals, crop protection and specialty chemistry products. The company is headquartered in Mumbai and has operations across India, Europe, North America and Africa. Tata Chemicals is a part of the Tata Group and its shares are traded on the NSE and BSE. Tata Chemicals has a publicly listed subsidiary called Rallis India.

== History and operations ==
Tata Chemicals has the third largest soda ash production capacity plant in India. This was the second soda ash plant built in India by Kapilram Vakil (grandson of late Indian justice Nanabhai Haridas) that started operating in the year 1944. The township Mithapur, derives its name from "Mitha" which means salt in Gujarati language.

Since 2006, Tata Chemicals has owned Brunner Mond, a United Kingdom-based chemical company with operations in Magadi (Kenya). On 27 March 2008, Tata Chemicals Ltd acquired General Chemical of US.

In April 2010, Tata Chemicals acquired 25% stake in ammonia-urea fertilizer complex in Gabon for US$290 million. The first phase of the plant will have a full operational capacity of 2.2 billion tons of ammonia and 3.85 billion tons of urea per day.

In 2016, Tata Chemicals sold its urea business to Pune-based Yara India, part of the Norwegian chemical company, Yara International.

In 2019, Tata Group transferred Tata Chemicals' branded food business to Tata Global Beverages (now Tata Consumer Products), in an all-share deal.

In 2022, Tata Chemicals, through its subsidiary Tata Chemicals Europe, set up the UK's first industrial-scale carbon capture and usage plant. The plant can capture 40,000 tonnes of carbon dioxide per annum.

== Research and Development Center ==
The Research and Development Center Tata Chemicals Innovation Center located at Pune, Maharashtra started operations in 2004. The team of scientists is working in the following areas: Food Science & Technology, Advanced Materials, Green Chemistry.

== Rallis India ==
Rallis India is a subsidiary of Tata Chemicals, and is listed on both the National Stock Exchange and the Bombay Stock Exchange. Rallis India operates in the agriculture sector and has an India focused business, an international focused business, and a seeds business. Both the India and international businesses focus on crop nutrition and crop protection products. The international business also offers active ingredients, formulations and contract manufacturing services.
