= Nairobi Terminus =

Railway station in Syokimau, Kenya

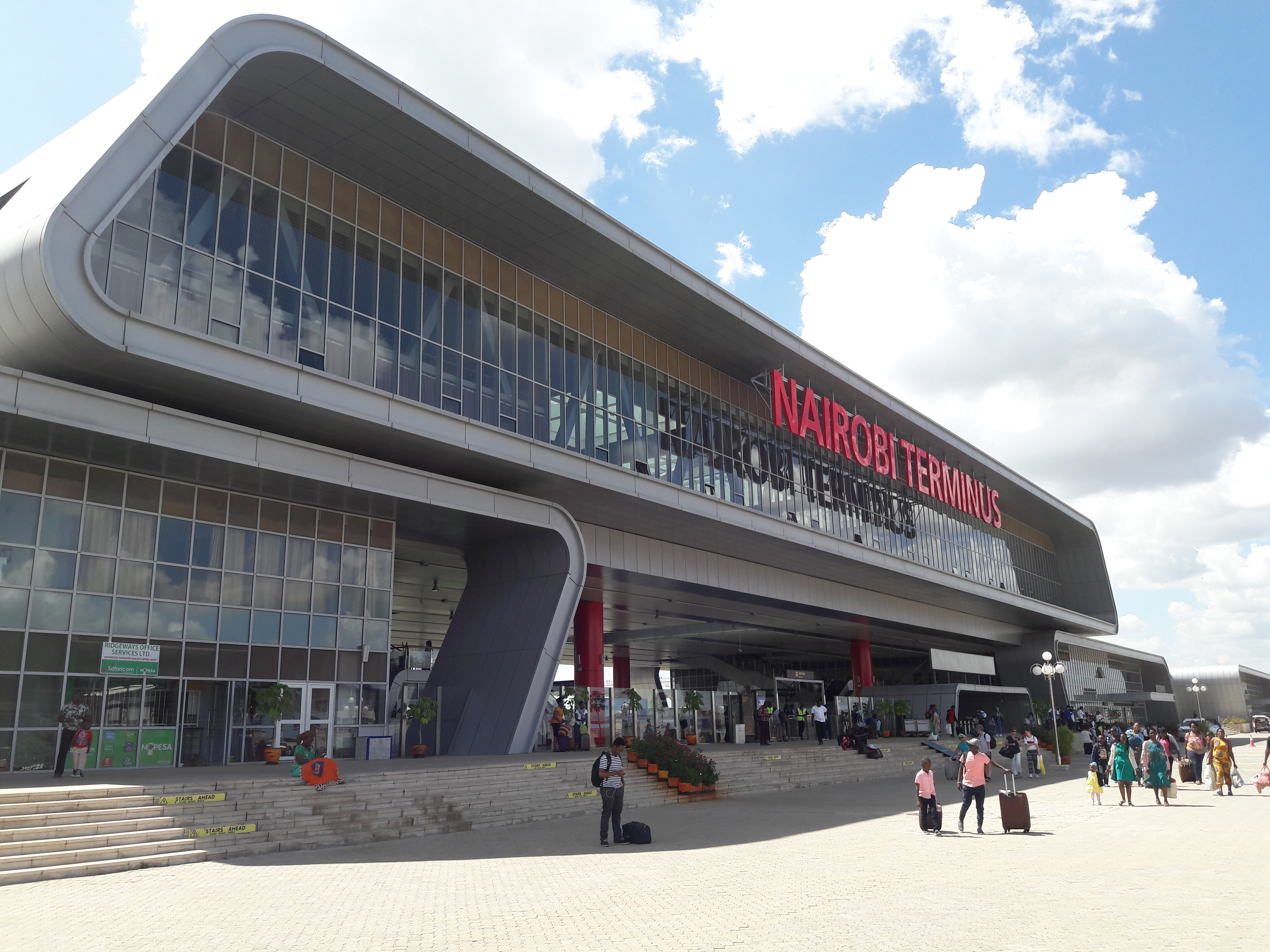

General information
- Coordinates: 1.35456°S 36.89843°E
- System: Heavy rail / freight
- Operator: Kenya Railways Corporation
- Line: Mombasa–Nairobi Standard Gauge Railway

History
- Opened: 2017

Services
Preceding station	Kenya Railways	Following station
Terminus	Mombasa–Nairobi Standard Gauge Railway	Athi River towards Mombasa Terminus
Rongai towards Ngong or Suswa	Suswa Safari Train	Terminus
Imara Daima towards Nairobi	Syokimau route	Syokimau Terminus
Location

Nairobi Terminus is a railway station on the Mombasa–Nairobi Standard Gauge Railway (SGR) located in Syokimau, just south of Nairobi, the capital of Kenya. Three passenger trains leave the station every day, an inter-county train that stops at all stations and two express trains that go directly to Mombasa Terminus.

The Nairobi Terminus station was built next to the existing Syokimau station, which allows passengers to transfer from standard gauge trains to metre gauge trains to get to the Nairobi city centre.

== Gallery ==
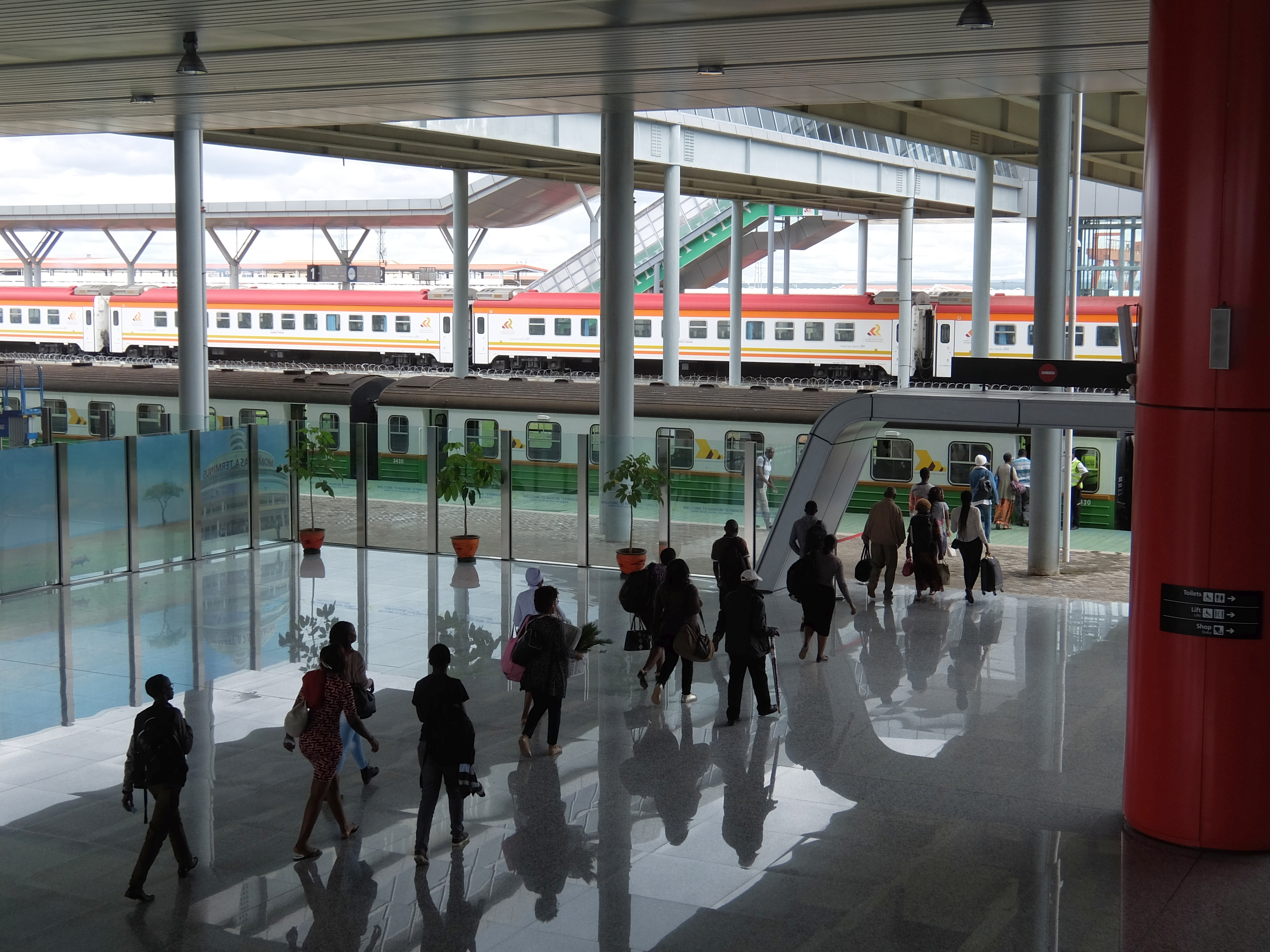
Nairobi Terminus transfer from SGR to meter gauge train network

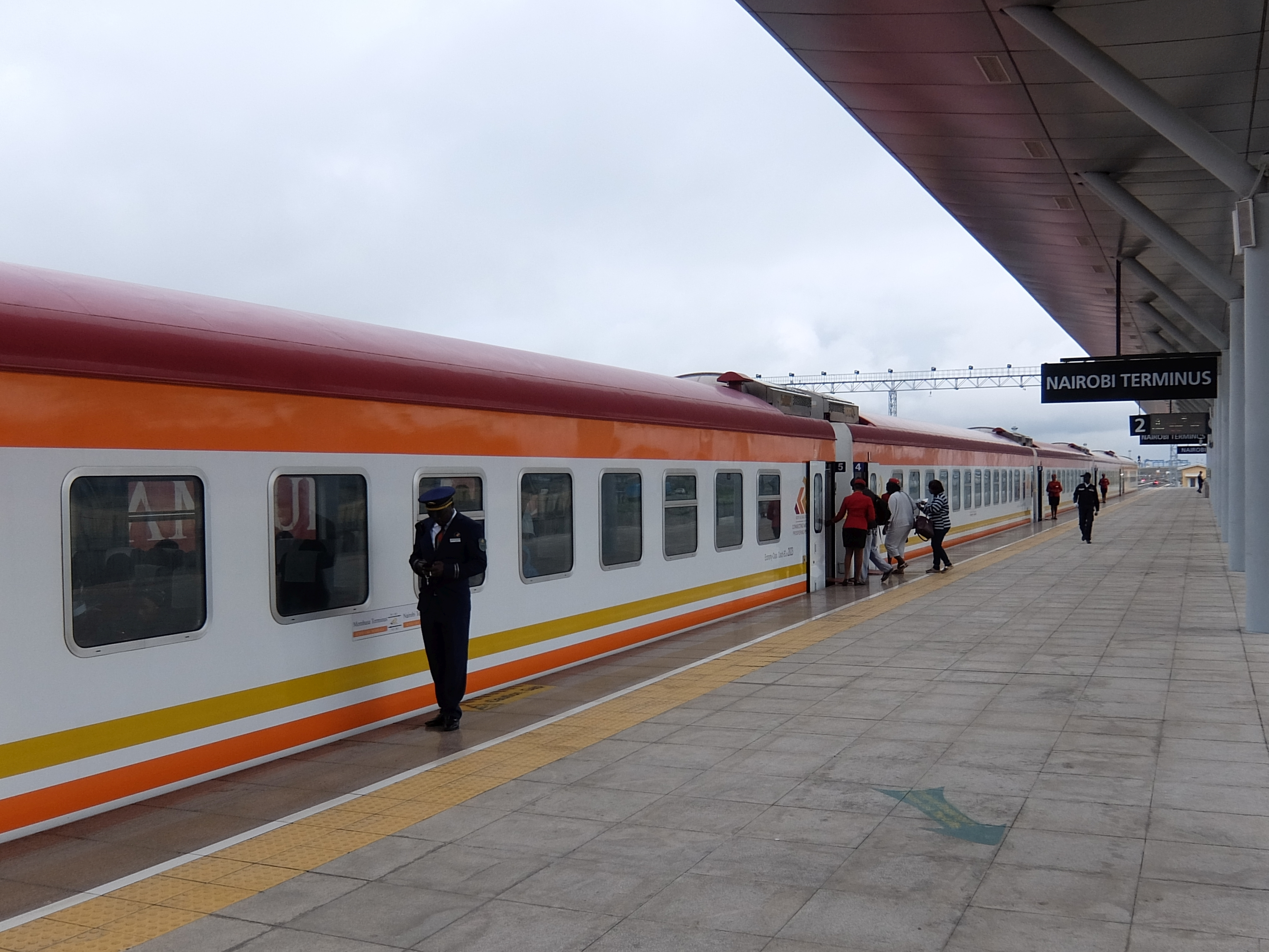
A train at the platform on Nairobi Terminus just before departure to Mombasa

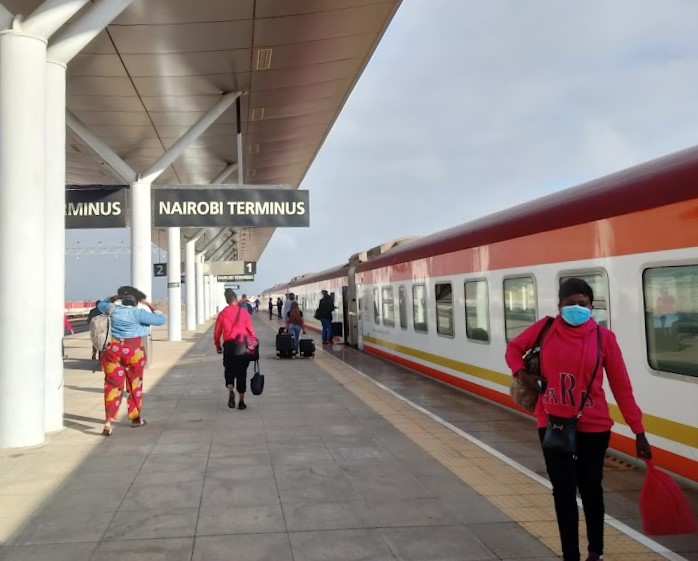
Nairobi Terminus sign

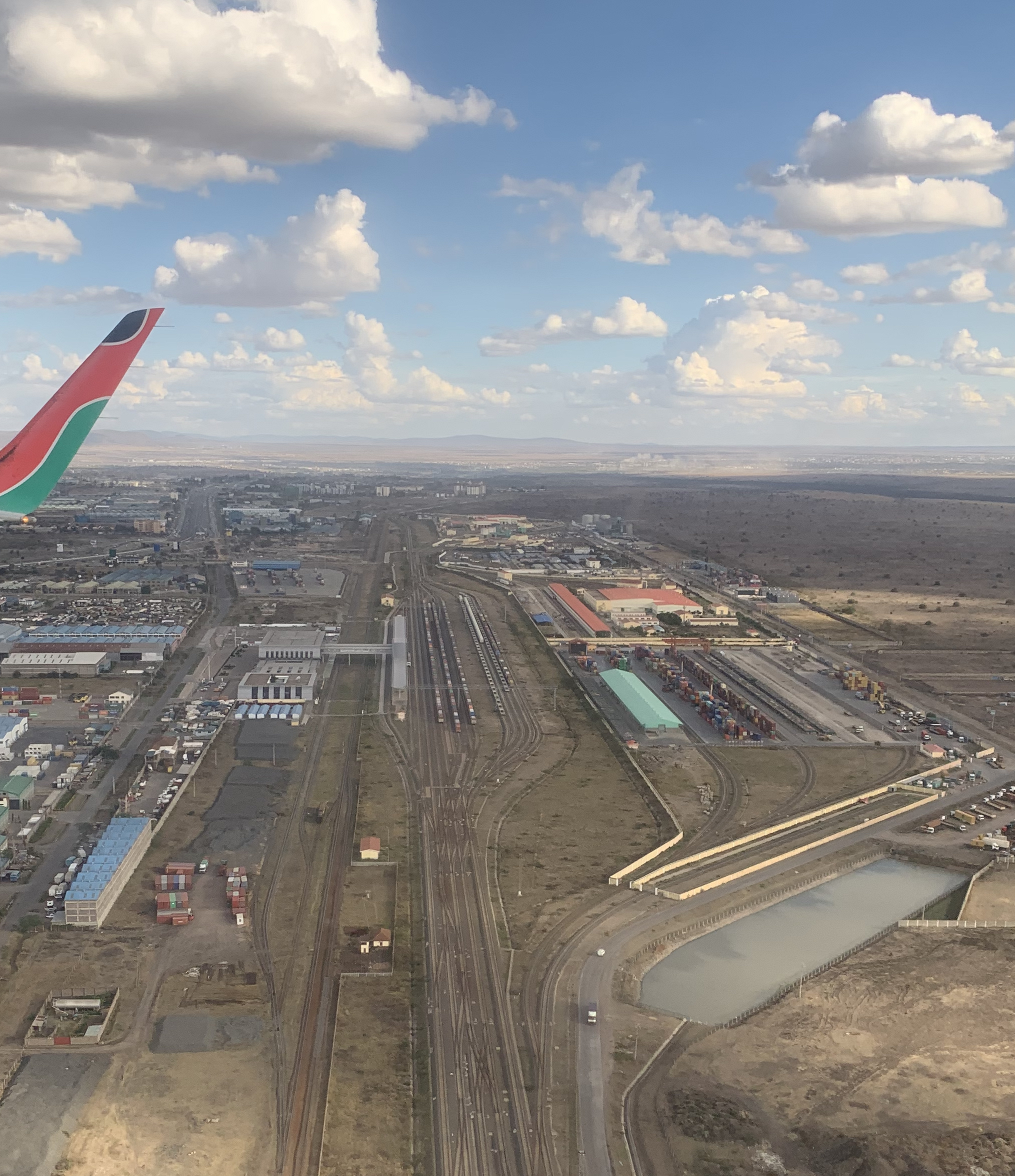
Nairobi Terminus from a plane landing at JKIA
