= Rift Valley Railways =

Consortium that operated railways in Kenya and Uganda

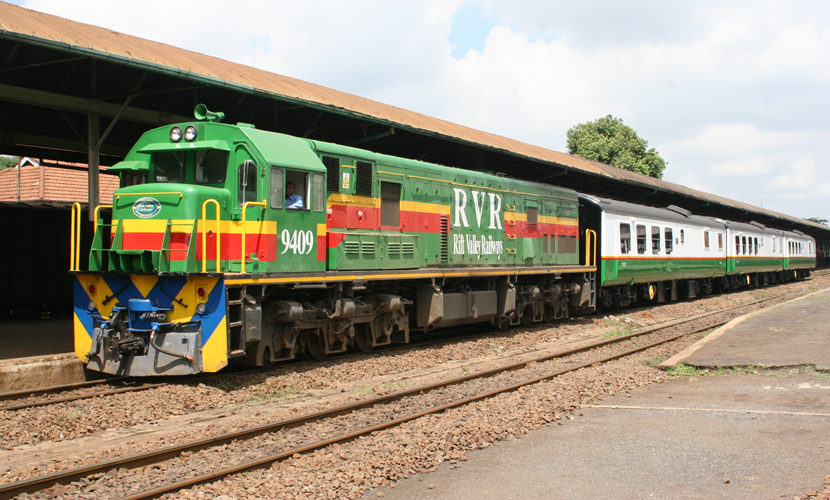
- An RVR GE U26C at Nairobi railway station
- Type: Private consortium
- Industry: Transportation
- Founded: 2005; 21 years ago
- Defunct: 2017
- Headquarters: Nairobi, Kenya
- Key people: Titus Naikuni; Chairman; Carlos Andrade; Group CEO; Bong Yoon; Chief Financial Officer
- Services: Railway systems
- Revenue: ▲$84.2 million (FY 2014)
- Operating income: ▼$11.3 million (FY 2014)
- Number of employees: 2100 (2014)

Rift Valley Railways (RVR) was a consortium established to manage the parastatal railways of Kenya and Uganda. The consortium won the bid for private management of the century-old Uganda Railway in 2005. The Kenya-Uganda railway had previously been run by the East African Railways and Harbours Corporation over the period 1948–77. In 2014, RVR moved 1,334 million net tonne kilometers of rail freight, up from 1,185 million net tonne kilometers the previous year. Both Kenya and Uganda terminated their contracts with RVR in mid-2017, with control of their national rail networks reverting to the Kenya Railways Corporation and the Uganda Railways Corporation, respectively.

== History ==
The railway line, derided as the "Lunatic Line" by a critical British press during its construction and still referred to colloquially as the "Lunatic Express", runs about 900 kilometres (560 mi) from Kenya's Indian Ocean port of Mombasa, through Nairobi, and up the Rift Valley to Kisumu on the shores of Lake Victoria.

Another leg of the same railway system traverses the Great Rift Valley, through the town of Eldoret in Kenya, entering Uganda at Malaba and passing through Tororo and Jinja to enter Kampala, Uganda's capital. From there, the railway continues to Kasese in the Western Region of Uganda close to the border with the Democratic Republic of the Congo, approximately 1,600 kilometres (990 mi) north-west of Mombasa. At Tororo, the northern leg of the Ugandan railway system branches off and travels north-westwards through Mbale, Soroti, and Lira to the city of Gulu, the largest metropolitan area in the Northern Region of Uganda. From Gulu, the line continues west to end in Pakwach on the banks of the Albert Nile, approximately 1,500 kilometres (930 mi) north-west of Mombasa.

== Original shareholding ==
Originally, RVR was led by Sheltam Rail Corporation of Sheltam Trade Close Corporation (STCC) of South Africa that had experience with managing other African railways. Minor partners of the consortium were Kenya's Prime Fuels (15%), Mirambo Holdings of Tanzania (10%), and Comazar (10%) and the CDIO Institute for Africa Development Trust (4%), both of South Africa. The consortium planned to invest in the railway system, upgrade it, reduce inefficiencies, use a smaller work force, and generate an annual concession fee of 11.1 percent in each country. In addition, it would have paid US$1 million annually for the passenger service concession in Kenya and $500,000 annually to Uganda for the same reason.

The takeover took effect in November 2006 and was scheduled to last 25 years. The 2007–2008 Kenyan crisis included destructive riots that blocked and partly destroyed the rail system between Kenya and Uganda leading to difficulties in supply. Further destruction and loss of income led to significant financial losses.

On 9 October 2008, Toll Holdings announced that it had entered into a contract to manage the Kenya-Uganda railway, replacing the management of RVR. The consortium had been criticized for falling freight traffic in the two years since taking control, while the consortium alleged that the drop resulted from the poor condition of the railway infrastructure and the damage done by protesters during the 2007–2008 Kenyan crisis. Officers from Toll subsidiary Patrick Defence Logistics managed the railway after the transition.

In February 2010, the East African Community announced plans to raise capital to "upgrade and expand the existing railway network to boost the region’s competitiveness". In a related development, the Egyptian investment company Citadel Capital bought a 49 percent stake in Sheltam Railway Company of South Africa, the lead investor in the RVR consortium. During the first quarter of 2010, Trans-Century filed an unsuccessful lawsuit in Mauritius, where RVR is incorporated, in an attempt to block Citadel Capital's entry into the consortium.

Press reports from East Africa in 2010 indicated that Charles Mbire, a wealthy Ugandan entrepreneur who represents Uganda on the RVR board of directors, had expressed interest in purchasing the 15 percent shareholding that should be reserved for Ugandans in the RVR consortium.

== Current shareholding ==
In March 2010, the RVR shareholders met in London, under binding arbitration. Following those talks, the new shareholding in RVR was Africa Railways Limited (ARL) 51%, TransCentury of Kenya 34% and Bomi Holdings of Uganda 15%.

ARL is a subsidiary of Citadel Capital, an Egyptian private equity firm.

TransCentury Limited is a private Kenyan investment company, whose shares are listed on the Nairobi Stock Exchange.

Bomi Holdings Limited is a Ugandan investment company owned by Charles Mbire.

The revised shareholding agreement was signed in Kampala, Uganda's capital city on 25 August 2010. The new owners pledged to invest US$250 million in the consortium to revitalize the railway network.

In March 2014, Trans-Century Limited divested from RVR by selling their 34 percent ownership interest to Africa Railways for an estimated US$43.7 million.

Citadel Capital has since re-branded as Qalaa Holdings.

Rift Valley Railways Stock Ownership At December 2014
Rank	Name of Owner	Percentage Ownership
1	Qalaa Holdings of Egypt	30
2	Bomi Holdings Limited of Uganda	15
3	Other Institutions	55
	Total	100

== Partnerships ==
In November 2010, RVR signed a technical and management agreement with América Latina Logística (ALL), based in Curitiba, Brazil. The firm is the largest independent company of its kind in Latin America. It has operations in Argentina and Brazil, where it oversaw the successful privatization of the national railway system. ALL will provide RVR with key management and operational staff and will oversee the transfer of technology, including selection and sourcing of raw material and information technology software and hardware. The initial partnership is for a renewable term of five years, starting in November 2010.

== New financing ==
In March 2011, media reports indicated the RVR intended to raise US$240 million to fund its expansion plans over the next five years. US$140 million will be raised by capital injection by the three corporate investors. The remaining US$100 will be borrowed from commercial banks. RVR already has a credit line estimated at US$54 million.

In July 2011, RVR secured a US$40 million loan from the African Development Bank to finance its improvements and expansion.

In the same month, RVR reported a positive EBITDA (earnings before interest, taxes, depreciation and amortization) for the year ending 30 June 2011. This marked the first positive annual EBITDA since African Railways acquired a 51 percent stake in RVR, in late 2009.

In August 2011, East Africa media outlets reported that RVR had secured a US$164 million long-term loan from a consortium of six international financial institutions, which included the International Finance Corporation, KfW, the Equity Bank Group, and the Dutch Development Bank . Another US$80 million will be raised by the shareholders. The difference will be realized from internally generated profits. The total amount needed over the next five years has been revised to US$287 million.

== Future investments ==
In August 2011, media outlets in East Africa reported that RVR was interested in financing and building the railway line linking Juba, the capital of South Sudan, to the industrial town of Tororo in the Eastern Region of Uganda at the international border between Uganda and Kenya, a distance of approximately 700 kilometres (435 mi), through Gulu and Nimule. The decision to proceed with this project would require approval from all partners in the RVR consortium and from the governments of Uganda and South Sudan. With new investments, RVR anticipates to cut the transit time for goods between Mombasa and Kampala to seven days from the current twenty-one.

In March 2015, RVR stated that it had met the terms agreed with the Kenya and Uganda governments in May 2014, thereby avoiding cancellation of its licence.

== New developments ==
In December 2010, RVR announced plans to increase freight volumes by 350% in the next year through improved infrastructure, in particular upgrading old rails. In September 2012, RVR began a major renovation of its locomotive overhaul facility in Nalukolongo, a suburb of Kampala. During the same month, RVR commission a refurbished ferry connecting Port Bell in Uganda to Mwanza in Tanzania and promised to commission a second vessel on the same route before the end of 2012.

On the line to the South Sudan frontier, the consortium expected to open the Tororo to Pakwach section to traffic in December 2012. However, this ambitious time schedule could not be fulfilled. The line northwest from Tororo towards Pakwach was cleared of vegetation and structures were repaired. The first commercial train in 20 years ran through on the metre gauge railway from the Kenyan port Mombasa to the Ugandan town of Tororo and onwards to Gulu on September 14, 2013. In October 2013 the Tororo-Gulu-Pakwach line was officially commissioned by the Ugandan head-of-state. Meanwhile, a plan for a Chinese-built line from Nairobi to Mombasa with open access would see RVR competing for business with other operators, which may lead to another legal battle. In July 2014, RVR received US$70 million in loan disbursement from a consortium of international financing agencies, as part of the US$287 million financing plan for the period 2011 - 2016. RVR will use some of the funds to establish passenger commuter service in Kampala, in collaboration with Kampala Capital City Authority. In February 2015, Rift Valley Railways Consortium, in collaboration with Kampala Capital City Authority, began testing commuter passenger railway service in Kampala and its suburbs, with a view to establish regular scheduled service beginning in March 2015.

== Termination of contract with Kenya ==
In July 2017, the government of Kenya terminated the 25-year contract that it signed with the Rift Valley Railways Consortium to run its metre-gauge line to Uganda. The operations of the railway in Kenya reverted to the Kenya Railways Corporation. The concession began on 23 January 2006 and had been planned to last 25 years.

== Termination of contract with Uganda ==
In June 2017, the Uganda government issued a 90-day notice to RVR, notifying the concession of Uganda's intention to terminate the concession. 4 September 2017 is the expected termination date. Uganda Railways Corporation is expected to resume operations, as before the concession was awarded.

== See also ==
- East African Community
- Kampala Capital City Authority
- Rail transport in Kenya
- Kenya Railways Corporation
