= Makadara =

Residential neighbourhood in Nairobi, Kenya

- Location of Makadara in Kenya
- Coordinates: 1°17′42″S 36°52′19″E
- Country: Kenya
- County: Nairobi City
- Sub-county: Makadara

Makadara is a residential neighbourhood in the city of Nairobi. It is approximately 6 kilometres (3.7 mi) southeast of the central business district of Nairobi.

== Location ==
Makadara is located approximately 6 kilometres (3.7 mi) southeast of Nairobi's central business district. It is straddled by Jogoo Road to the north. It borders other neighbourhoods such as Buruburu, Bahati and Industrial Area; it contains Hamza and Maringo estates.

== Overview ==
Makadara is generally a high-density housing and low-income to middle-income neighbourhood with a mixture of mid-rises and old bungalows. Residents of Makadara struggle with limited infrastructure, with unpaved roads in some areas and insufficient water.

Makadara Constituency and Makadara Sub-county both borrow their names from the estate. Both are electoral and administrative divisions of Nairobi.
