= Lukenya =

- Town
- Location in Kenya
- Coordinates: 1°29′S 37°9′E
- Country: Kenya
- County: Machakos

Population (2006 Census)
  - Total: 29,573
- Time zone: UTC+3 (EAT)

Lukenya is a township in Machacos county, Kenya around 40 km from Nairobi. The Nairobi Commuter train has a line going from Lukenya to the center of Nairobi. The private Lukenya University is situated in Lukenya. Lukenya Hills are situated near Lukenya and they house important wildlife.
