= Mombasa–Nairobi Standard Gauge Railway =

Standard gauge railway line in Kenya

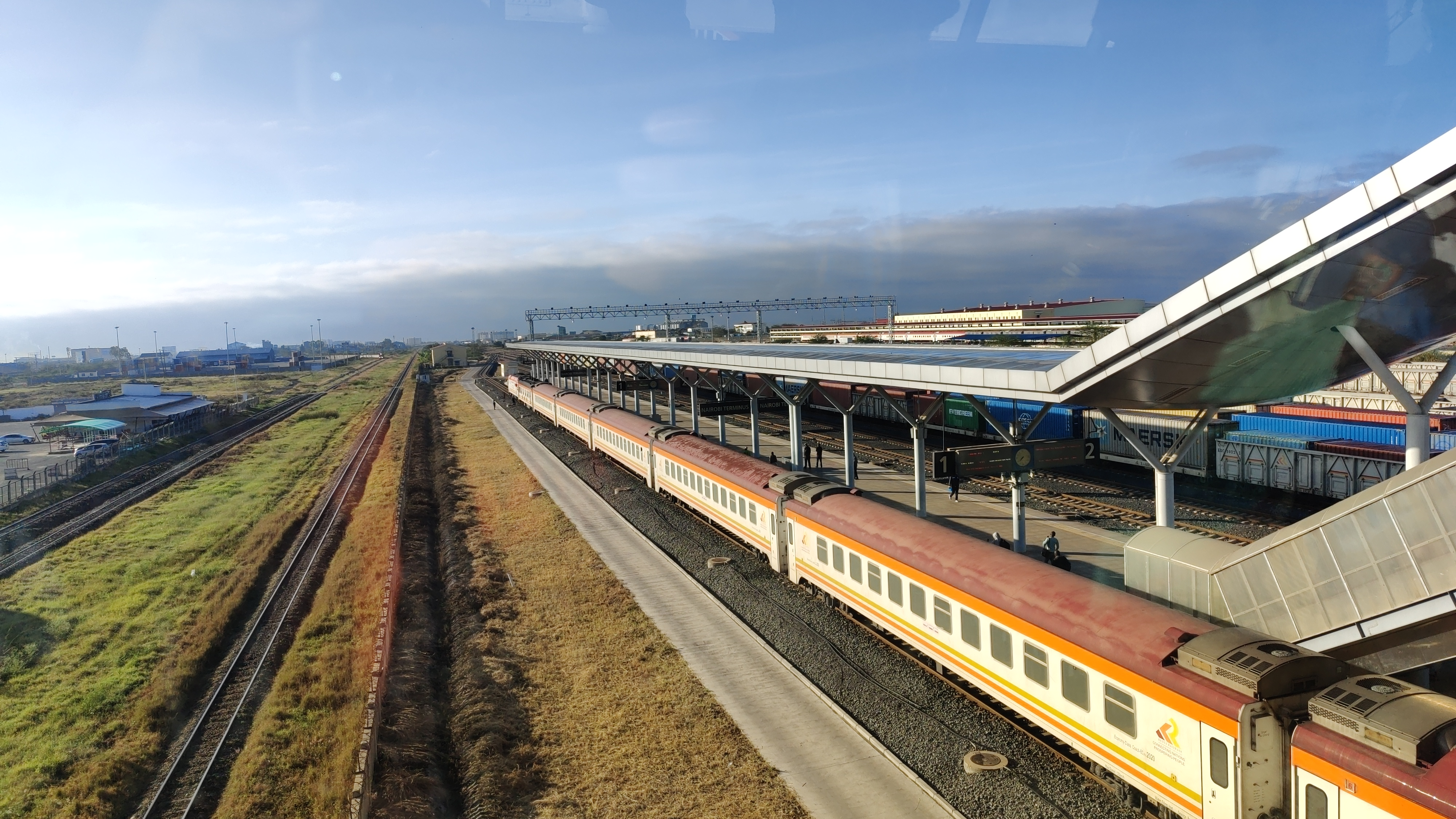
- SGR train at Nairobi Terminus

Overview
- Status: Operational
- Termini: Mombasa; Nairobi
- Website: www.krc.co.ke

Service
- Type: Heavy rail
- Ridership: 1,665,627 (2018)

History
- Opened: 31 May 2017; 9 years ago

Technical
- Line length: 472 km (293 mi)
- Character: Fully grade-separated
- Track gauge: 1,435 mm (4 ft 8 1/2 in) standard gauge
- Electrification: None, upgrade planned
- Operating speed: 120 kilometres per hour (75 mph) (passenger); 80 kilometres per hour (50 mph) (freight)

Mombasa–Nairobi Standard Gauge Railway

The Mombasa–Nairobi Standard Gauge Railway, completed in 2017, was built as the first phase of the Kenya Standard Gauge Railway. It is a standard-gauge railway (SGR) in Kenya that connects the large Indian Ocean city of Mombasa with Nairobi, the country's capital and largest city. This SGR runs parallel to the narrow-gauge Uganda Railway that was completed in 1901 under British colonial rule. The East African Railway Master Plan provides for the Mombasa–Nairobi SGR to link with other SGRs being built in the East African Community.

At a cost of US$3.6 billion, the SGR was among Kenya's most expensive infrastructure projects at the time it was launched. The prime contractor was the China Road & Bridge Corporation CRBC, which hired 25,000 Kenyans to work on the railway. CRBC's holding company, China Communications Construction Company is contracted to operate the line for its first five years. As of 2020, railway operation expenses exceeded revenues.

A 120km extension from Nairobi to Naivasha and Suswa, begun in 2018, was completed in October 2019, expanding Kenya's standard gauge network to a total length of approximately 592 km (368 mi).

The first fare-paying passengers boarded the "Madaraka Express" on Madaraka Day (1 June 2017), the 54th anniversary of Kenya's attainment of self-rule from Great Britain. Commercial freight services began on 1 January 2018. Passenger uptake has exceeded expectations, with the train carrying 2 million riders in the first 17 months of operation. By November 2018, the SGR was operating 30 freight trains and 4 passenger trains per day. Double-stack freight trains have run on the line since 2018.

== Route ==
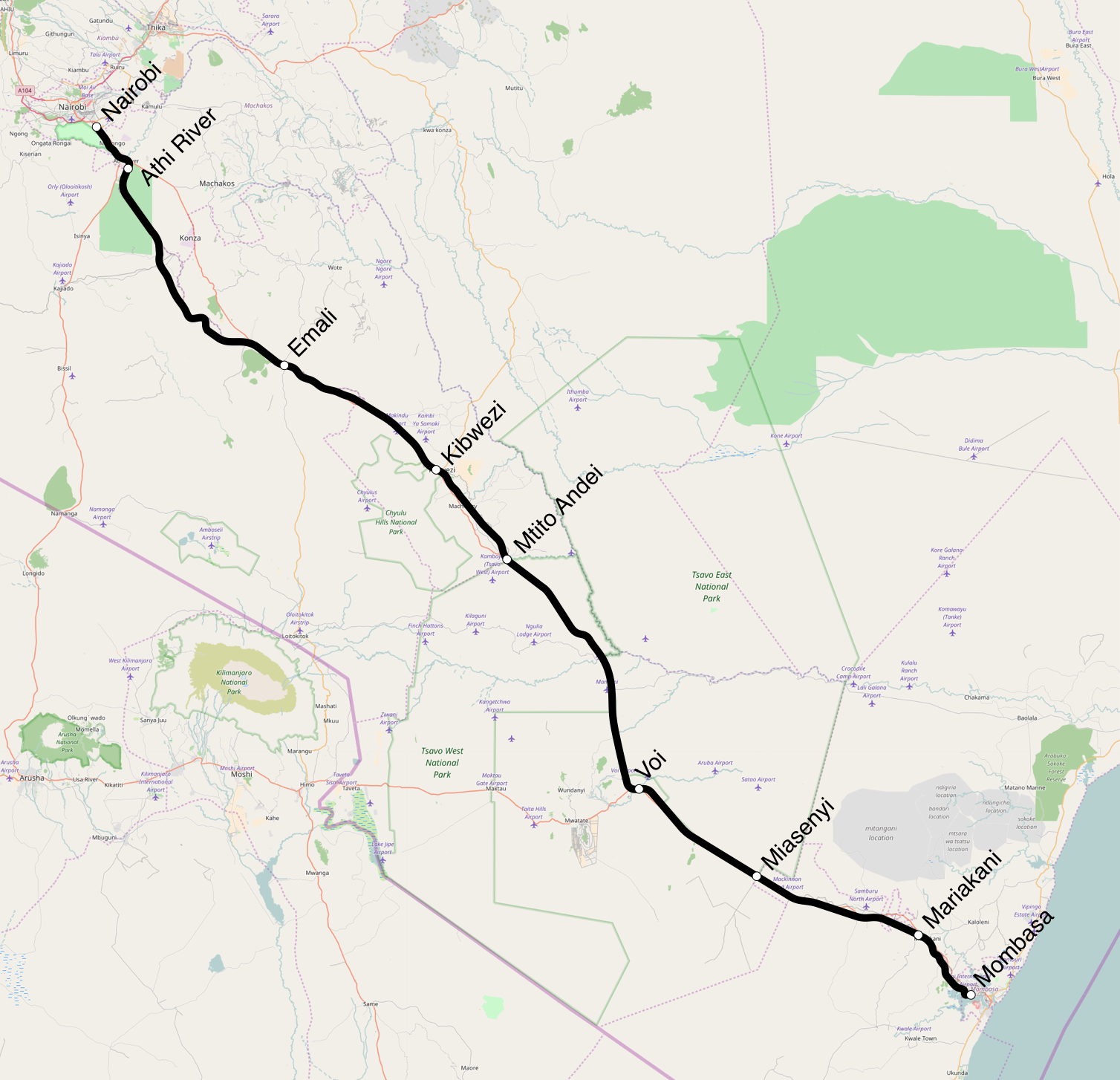
Mombasa-Nairobi Standard Gauge Railway Map

The Mombasa-Nairobi SGR generally runs parallel to the Uganda Railway, a metre-gauge line built during British colonial rule. The SGR, however, has a straighter alignment that accommodates higher speeds. Because of the rough and hilly terrain, large portions of the SGR were built on viaducts and embankments and in cuttings.

For example, the Uganda Railway tackled the hilly terrain near Mazeras township by using a spiral. In contrast, the SGR passes through this area on two bridges, with the 43.5 metres (142 ft 9 in) high Mazeras-2 bridge being the highest on the route. As it approaches Nairobi, the SGR crosses the 2.6 kilometres (1.6 mi) Athi River Super Bridge, which at the time of its completion was the sixth longest bridge in Africa. The SGR has a total of 98 bridges.

The SGR's viaducts and embankments are elevated above ground level, allowing wildlife to pass underneath. This has brought a substantial improvement in wildlife protection from that which obtained under the old Uganda Railway. Passing through the transport corridor between Tsavo East National Park and Tsavo West National Park concurrently with the Nairobi–Mombasa Road, the road and old metre-gauge railway were built at ground level, causing frequent collisions with wildlife.

Passenger trains run between Mombasa Terminus in Miritini and Nairobi Terminus in Syokimau, near the Jomo Kenyatta International Airport.

Freight services are provided between Port Reitz, just west of Mombasa Island, and the inland container depot in the Embakasi division of Nairobi.

== Passenger stations ==
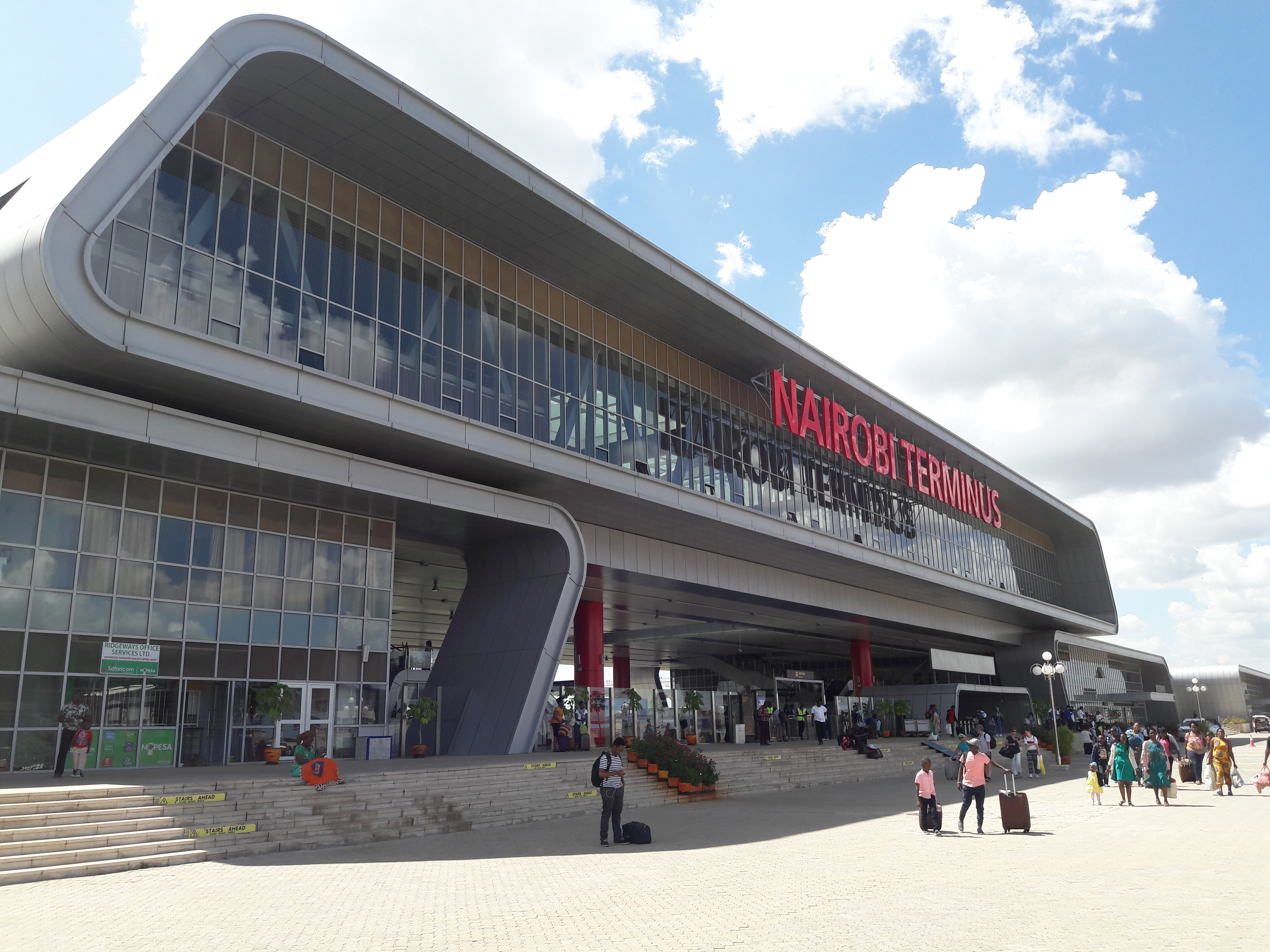
Nairobi Terminus railway station on the Standard Gauge Railway in Kenya

There are nine passenger stations between Mombasa and Nairobi. Each station's architecture is inspired by local elements.

Station	Architecture
Mombasa Terminus	Concentric circles and a central tower, representing a ripple in the ocean.
Mariakani	Porticos are inspired by coconut trees, which are plentiful in the region.
Miasenyi	White and brown stripes, inspired by the stripes of a zebra.
Voi	V-shaped like a person with raised hands, representing the spirit of Harambee. V is also the first letter of Voi.
Mtito Andei	Sloping roofs, representing Mount Kilimanjaro and the Chyulu Hills.
Kibwezi	Based on traditional African architecture, with leaves that shade passengers from the sun.
Emali	A closed fist, representing unity.
Athi River	Shaped like the region's hills.
Nairobi Terminus	Two trains with a bridge on top.

Passengers can transfer at Nairobi Terminus to metre-gauge trains into the Nairobi city centre. Although they are currently designated as terminals, the Mombasa and Nairobi stations were built as through stations, and were originally designated Mombasa West Station and Nairobi South Station. When Phase 2 of the SGR is completed, trains will continue through the Nairobi station to the Uganda border.

== Specifications ==
Kenya is a member of the Northern Corridor Integration Project (NCIP), which has selected the Chinese National Railway Class 1 standard for its railways. The adoption of a common standard allows for seamless integration between the railways of NCIP countries.

- Gauge: Standard-gauge
- Couplers: Janney AAR
- Brakes: Air
- Electrification: None, in planning
- Design capacity: 22 million tonnes per year
- Structure gauge: Sufficient for double-stack containers

== History ==
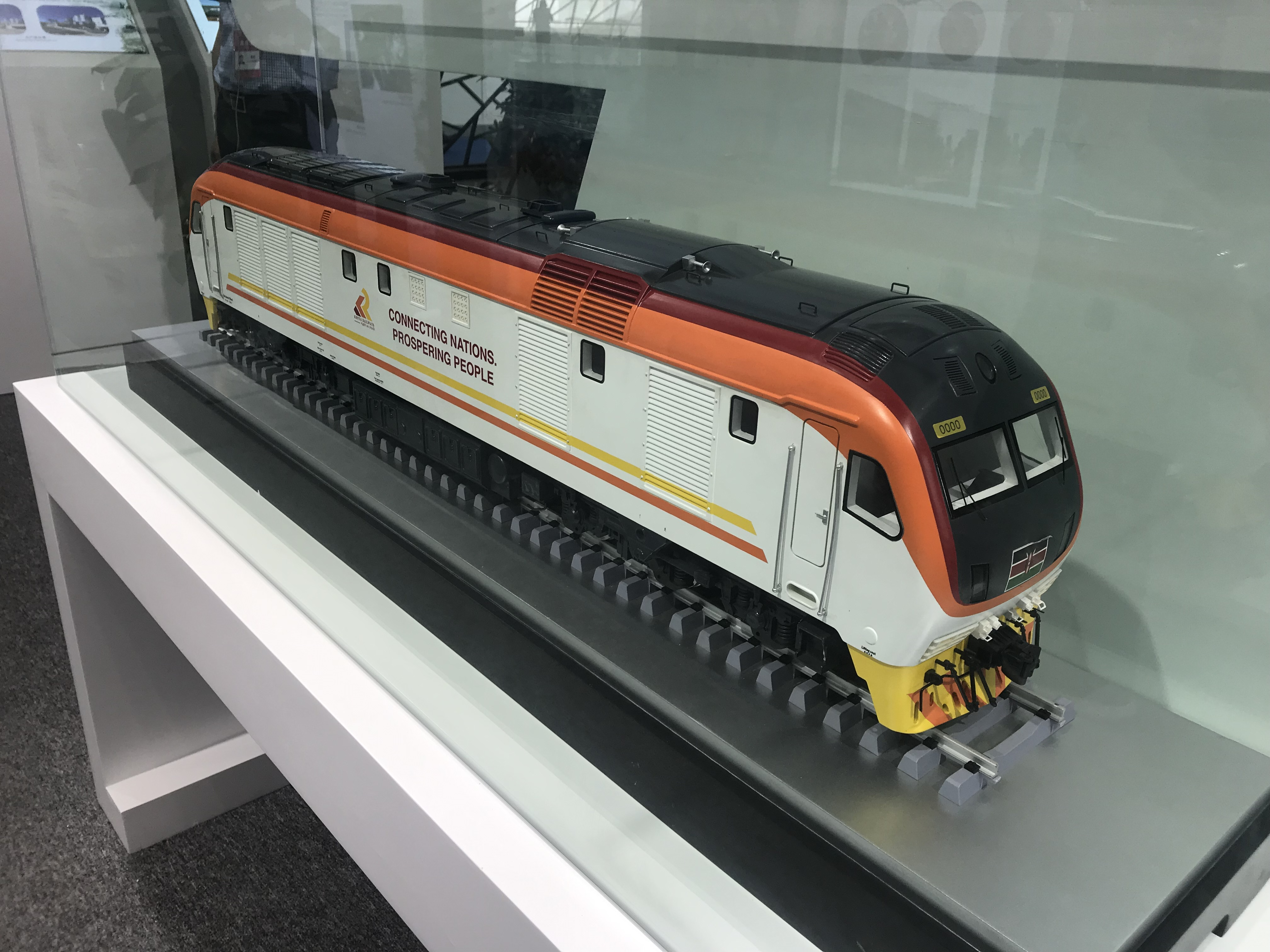
A DF11 locomotive used on the SGR (model)

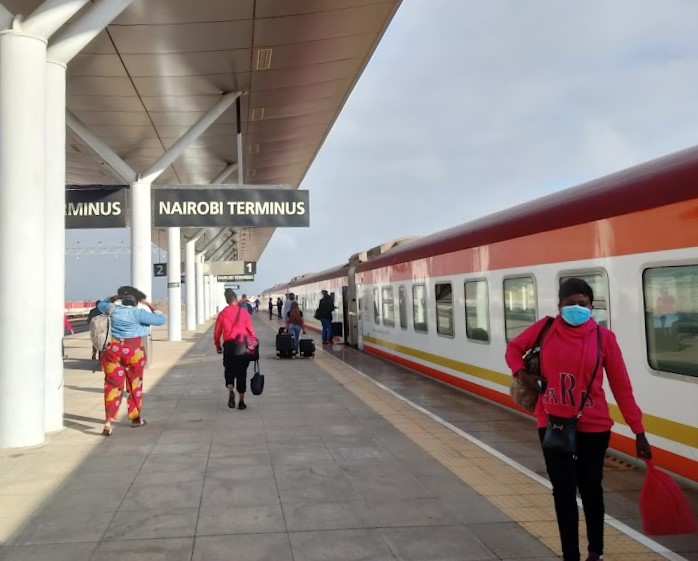
25G Coaches at Nairobi Terminus

In the 2000s, Kenya's colonial-era metre-gauge railways deteriorated from lack of maintenance. By 2016, passenger trains were taking an entire day to travel from Nairobi to Mombasa, compared to 12 hours during the early 1990s. Freight transported from the Port of Mombasa fell from 4.8 million tonnes per year in the 1980s to 1.5 million tonnes per year in 2012. In 2014, the Rift Valley Railways Consortium, the operator of railways in Kenya and Uganda, reported a loss of US$1.5 million.

At the same time, the Chinese government was funding railway construction in other African countries. In 2011, Kenya signed a memorandum of understanding with the China Road & Bridge Corporation to build a standard-gauge railway between Mombasa and Nairobi. The US$3.6 billion railway was the largest infrastructure project in Kenya since independence. Financing was finalised in May 2014, with the Exim Bank of China extending a loan for 90 percent of the project cost and the remaining 10 percent coming from the Kenyan government. 25,000 Kenyans were hired to work on the project. Tracklaying was completed in December 2016. Passenger service was officially inaugurated on 31 May 2017, eighteen months ahead of schedule.

== Rolling stock ==
Type	Manufacturer	Number	Notes	Source
DF8B	CRRC Qishuyan	43	Freight locomotive	
DF7G	CRRC Qishuyan	8	Shunting locomotive/Road switcher	
DF11	CRRC Qishuyan	5	Passenger locomotive	
25G	CRRC Nanjing Puzhen	40	Passenger coaches and support cars	
C70E	CRRC Qiqihar	1620+	Open high-sided wagon	
NX70	CRRC Qiqihar	1620+	Container wagon	
X2K	CRRC Qiqihar	1620+	Well car	
P70	CRRC Qiqihar	1620+	Covered goods wagon	

In 2022, 500 additional freight wagons were ordered to increase capacity. In June 2024, a further 20 coaches from CRRC Nanjing Puzhen (four premium coaches, four first-class coaches, 10 economy coaches and two power wagons) were shipped from Shanghai.

== Financing ==
The Mombasa-Nairobi Railway is one of the largest recipients of Belt and Road Initiative funding, as of at least 2024.

The project cost of the first phase of the SGR from Mombasa to Nairobi was 90% financed by the Export-Import Bank of China and the remainder funded by the Kenyan government. The $3.23 billion financing from Exim was finalised in May 2014. Exim advanced the loan amount in two subsidized loans of US$1.63 billion each. One of the loans was a foreign aid loan provided on a concessional basis (very low interest rate) while the other was a below-market rate preferential export buyer's credit. A condition imposed by the Kenyan government for the financing was 40% of the total project costs or about 130 billion Kenyan shillings would be spent on local supplies including sand, cement, electric cables, galvanised iron and steel.

A condition by Exim Bank for the loan was to have an operator acceptable to the bank for the initial phase of operations, which led the Kenyan government to reject a planned international tender and to contract the mother company of CRBC.

In January 2020, Business Daily Africa reported that the second loan, related to the Nairobi-Naivasha section of the Kenyan SGR, amounting to $1.482 billion, with a five-year grace period, fell due in January 2021. It attracts an interest rate of approximately 3.34 percent per annum and will be due in 30 semi-annual installments, beginning on 21 January 2021 until 21 July 2035.

=== Land allocation controversy ===
On 22 July 2020, Mohammed Abdalla Swazuri, the chairman of National Land Commission, and Atanas Kariuki Maina, managing director of the Kenya Railways Corporation, were among 18 officials, businesspeople and companies arrested on corruption charges involving land allocation for the $3 billion flagship Nairobi–Mombasa railway.

== Operation ==
The railway is owned by the Kenya Railways Corporation (KRC), a state-owned corporation of Kenya. It contracts the operations and maintenance of the line to the Africa Star Railway Operations Company (Afristar), a subsidiary of the China Road and Bridge Corporation (CRBC), and the primary constructor of the line. Afristar was given the legal right to the first ten years of operation of the SGR, with an interim review set for the end of the fifth year of the contract. While many of the employees working on the SGR are Kenyans, as of July 2018 Chinese workers still occupied most of the critical positions, including dispatchers and locomotive drivers. This sparked political controversy in Kenya, as after one year of operations a full handover to Kenyans was yet to take place. The Kenya Transport Ministry explained that a full handover would occur in 2027, according to the current agreement; later, the interim review was initiated to study the feasibility of transferring critical positions to the Kenya Railways Corporation, which successfully negotiated takeover shifting towards an earlier date of May 2022 with the CRBC. Kenyans would gradually take over all positions on the SGR, completing the full takeover in 2022. During the transition period in June 2021, the Kenya Railroad Company had already taken over the ticketing, security, and refuelling departments.

In 2018, the railway handled 1.6 million passengers and 5 million tonnes of freight. In 2019, the government required all cargo being cleared in the port in Mombasa to be handled by the railway, leading to protests from cargo transporters. According to a contract between the Exim bank, Kenya Railways Corporation, and Kenya Ports Authority, the KPA must provide 1 million tonnes of freight at the start of the operation, rising to 6 million by 2024.

=== Costs ===
There has been some debate about whether the SGR has brought lower freight costs or higher costs due to high "last mile transport" from Nairobi terminus.

== See also ==
- Nairobi–Malaba Standard Gauge Railway
- Kenya Standard Gauge Railway
- Uganda Standard Gauge Railway
- Rwanda Standard Gauge Railway
