= Kenya Railways Corporation =

State-owned Kenyan railway company

Kenya Railways Corporation (KRC)
- Type: Government-owned corporation
- Industry: Public Transport
- Predecessor: East African Railways and Harbours Corporation
- Founded: 1977
- Headquarters: Nairobi, Nairobi County; Kenya
- Products: Railway and Commuter rail transportation

Kenya Railways (KR)

Operation
- Infrastructure company: Kenya Railways (KR)

System length
- Total: 2,066 kilometres (1,284 mi)

Track gauge
- Main: 1,000 mm (3 ft 3 3/8 in)
- 1,000 mm (3 ft 3 3/8 in) metre gauge: 930 kilometres (580 mi)
- 1,435 mm (4 ft 8 1/2 in) standard gauge: 592 kilometres (368 mi)

Features
- No. of stations: 180 approx

Kenya Railways Corporation (KRC), also Kenya Railways (KR) is the national railway of Kenya. Established in 1977, KR is a state corporation.

== History ==
The original Uganda Railway was transformed into the East African Railways and Harbours Corporation (EAR&H) after World War II. The EAR&H managed the railways of Uganda, Kenya, and Tanganyika until the collapse of the East African Community in 1977. KR then took over the Kenyan part of the EARC.

== Operations ==
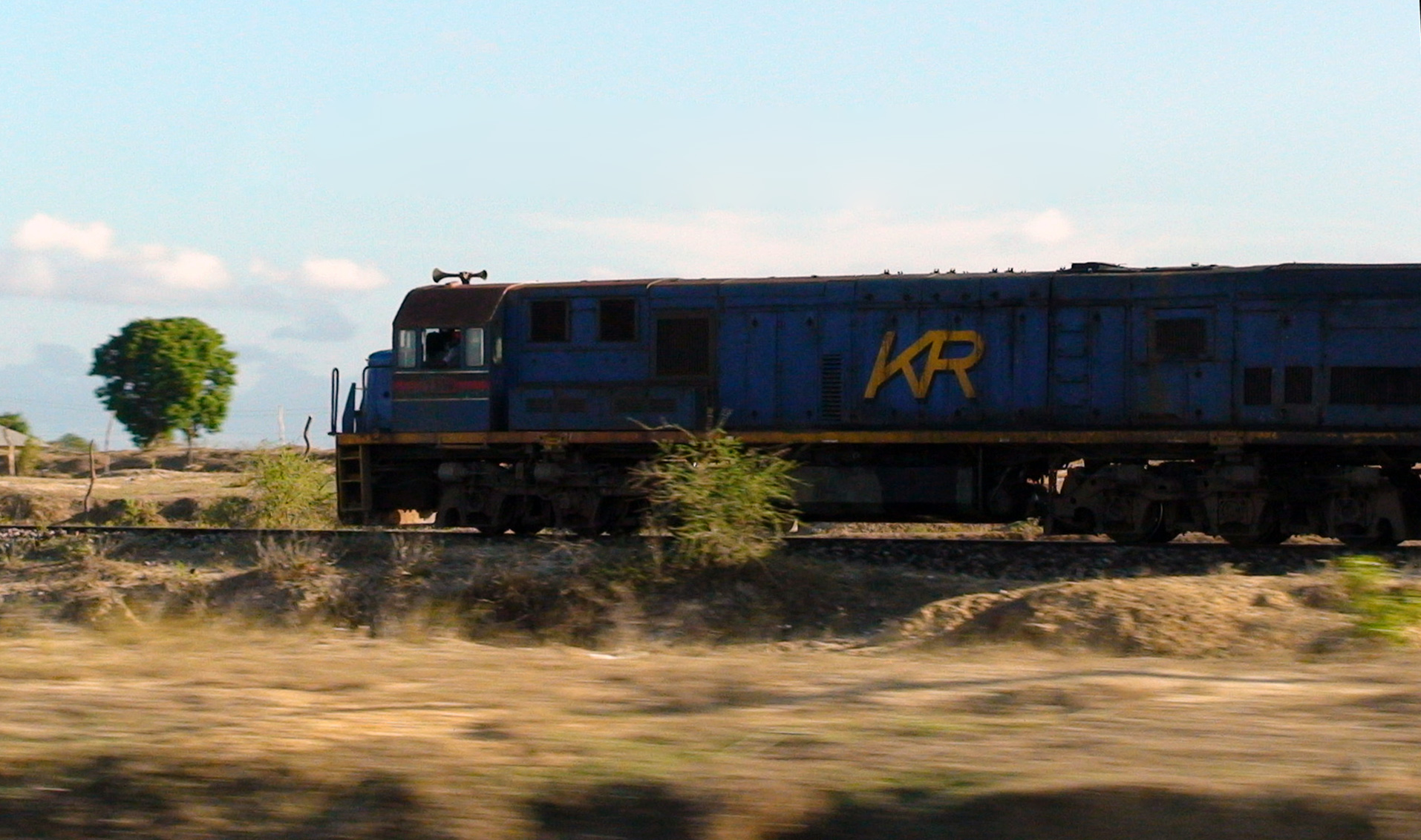
A Kenya Railways GE U26C type locomotive

Like the other members of the East African Community, Kenya uses the narrow gauge track gauge of 1,000 mm (3 ft 3 3/8 in) (metre gauge).

The mainline of the KR is based on the original Uganda Railway. Its 930 km (578 mi) main track connected the Indian Ocean port of Mombasa to the port of Kisumu at Lake Victoria. Half way is the capital of Nairobi that was founded as a rail depot of the UR. The British added several branch lines as well as a link to Tanzania and a link to Uganda. The total system eventually had 2,778 km (1,726 mi) of track.

As of 2006 much of the overall railway system has been neglected or is in disrepair. Nevertheless, the mainline from Mombasa to Kisumu is operative though at reduced speed. For passengers, the "Jumbo Kenya Deluxe" connects Nairobi and Mombasa. The fourteen-hour overnight trip runs three times a week either eastbound or westbound on the single track. The "Port Florence Express" connects Nairobi with Kisumu.

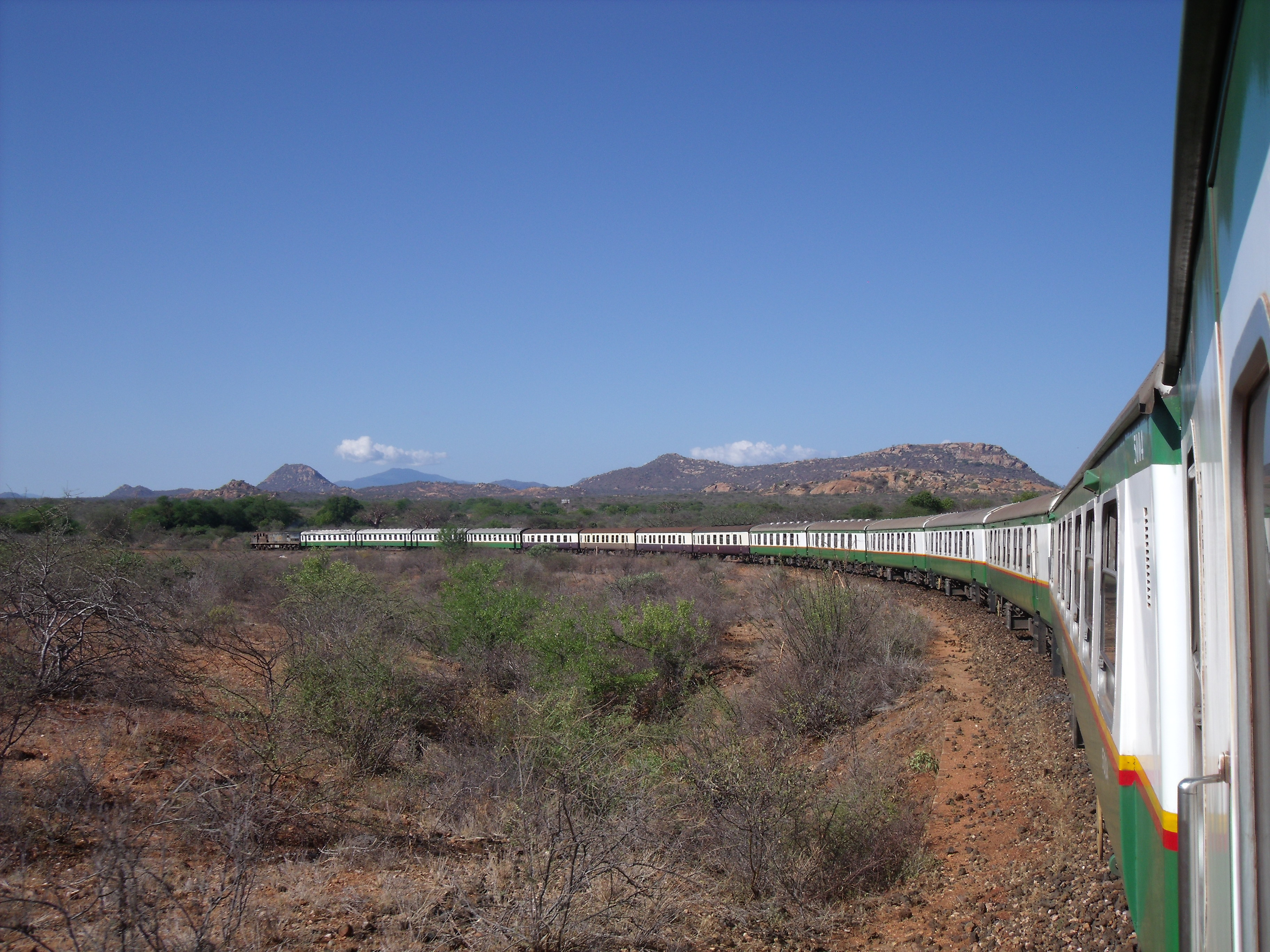
The Nairobi - Mombasa overnight train with Kilimanjaro on the horizon.

KR also operates the Kenyan ferry system on Lake Victoria.

In 2010, KRX announced plans to construct a new station on Mombasa Road in Nairobi; part of a planned commuter network which would include an airport link.

== Parameters ==
- brakes are automatic air brakes.
- couplings are M.C.A., P.H. Lloyd Co Ltd

== 2006 management change ==
The KR has suffered from inefficient management, has a bloated work force, and has run deficit operations in spite of its potential. For several years there had been plans to privatize and revitalize the system. In 2005, Rift Valley Railways (RVR) from South Africa won the concession to run KR and Uganda Railways Corporation. RVR was to take over operations on 1 August 2006 and intended to streamline operations, reduce the work force, and make major investments to upgrade the system. On 28 July 2006 the East African Standard reported that the planned take-over was postponed to 1 November 2006. This operational take-over took place in November and was scheduled to last for 25 years.

On 9 October 2008, Toll Holdings of Australia announced that it has entered into a contract to manage the Kenya-Uganda railway, replacing the management by Rift Valley Railways Consortium. The consortium was criticized for falling freight traffic in the two years since taking control, while RVR alleges the drop is due to the poor condition of the railway infrastructure and the damage done by protesters during the 2007–2008 Kenyan crisis. Officers from Toll subsidiary Patrick Defence Logistics were to manage the railway after the transition.

Towards the end of 2008, after just a few months in charge, Toll pulled out of its management obligations after disagreements with the owners and the Toll appointed MD resigned, mirroring a similar reversal of appetite that occurred when Toll took over Tranz Rail (New Zealand's privatised rail operator) in 2003.

== 2008 riots ==
During the riots of the 2007–2008 Kenyan crisis sections of railway were destroyed. As a result, shipments to Uganda were suspended.

== 2018 corruption scandal ==
On 22 July 2020, Mohammed Abdalla Swazuri, the chairman of National Land Commission, and Atanas Kariuki Maina, managing director of the Kenya Railways Corporation, were among 18 officials, businesspeople and companies arrested on corruption charges involving land allocation for Kenya Railways Corporation's $3 billion flagship Nairobi-Mombasa railway.

== New standard gauge network ==
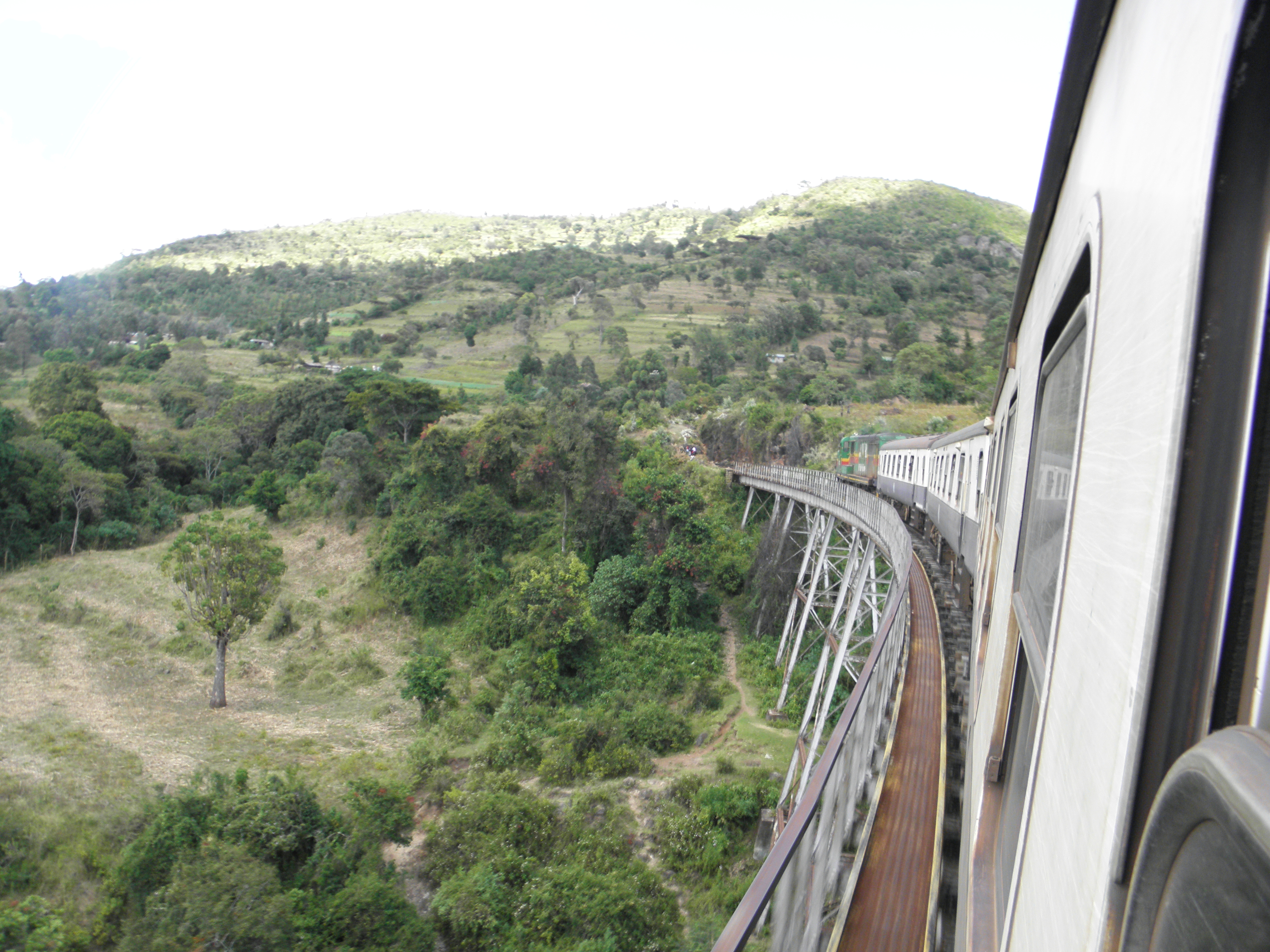
Kisumu Line

In 2012, plans were developed to expand the system with a new railway that connects to other countries, namely Uganda, Rwanda, and possibly South Sudan and Ethiopia. The new railway would be 1,435 mm (4 ft 8 1/2 in) standard gauge. Kenya had been negotiating with China to reconstruct the Nairobi-Mombasa section first. Construction of the first phase of the planned 2 937 km $13.5bn line was inaugurated in Mombasa on 28 November 2013. Civil works on the Mombasa-Nairobi first phase were completed in November 2016, and passenger service began on 31 May 2017.

=== MoKaKi railway ===
Passenger and freight services currently operate between Mombasa and Naivasha via Nairobi. The extension from Naivasha to Kampala is planned. The finished project will connect Mombasa via Kampala to Kigali, hence MoKaKi.

==== First phase ====
The first phase between Nairobi and Mombasa, a distance of 609 km, was built by China Road and Bridge Corporation (CRBC). The project will cost Sh327 billion, but it was later increased to Sh 420 billion to allow it source for locomotives and wagons as well. The estimated cost was $2.9m per km. The $3.8 billion deal was signed in May, 2012 in Nairobi by visiting Chinese premier Li Keqiang, along with the presidents of Kenya, Rwanda, South Sudan and Uganda. The Exim Bank of China provided 90% of the funds for the phase-one project, with Kenya providing the remainder. President Uhuru Kenyatta presided over the groundbreaking ceremony for the standard gauge railway in November 2013. The whole project is expected to cost Ksh 1.3T (327b from Mombasa to Nairobi, a distance of 609 km). However the project had been riddled with corruption allegations, overpricing, and ignoring of procurement processes. Nandi MP Alfred Keter has been at the forefront on the corruption allegations that caused the parliamentary committee of investment and transport to investigate the project. However Keter has been accused of being hired as a mouthpiece by a prominent investor to fight the project. By May 2015, construction was underway, and Civil works on the first phase were completed in November 2016. Passenger service between Mombasa and Nairobi, called the Madaraka Express, began on 31 May 2017. By November 2018 the service had transported over 2 million passengers.

==== Second phase ====
The second phase is operating between Nairobi and Naivasha. When complete, it will extend further westwards to Malaba on the Kenya-Uganda border. There were protests that the second phase would cut through the Nairobi National Park and that the cost of the railway was excessive. In September 2016, an environmental tribunal temporarily halted the project. On 20 October 2016, President Uhuru Kenyatta inaugurated construction of Phase 2A, from Nairobi to Naivasha. Phase 2A was constructed by the China Communications Construction Company. 85% of the project cost was financed by the Export-Import Bank of China, with the balance of the funded by the Kenyan government's Railway Development Levy Fund. The Nairobi–Naivasha portion opened in October 2019.

==== Future phases ====
Once the line from Naivasha to Malaba is completed, there are plans to extend lines to Kampala, Kigali, Bujumbura and Juba.

=== LAPSSET ===
The LAPSSET railway project is a railway that is proposed to connect Kenya, Ethiopia, and South Sudan. It will be built from Lamu in Kenya to Juba and Addis Ababa.

== See also ==
- Lunatic Express
- Rail transport in Kenya
- Rift Valley Railways Consortium
- Tanzania Railways Corporation
- Transport in Kenya
