= Membley Estate Ruiru =

Membley
- Suburb
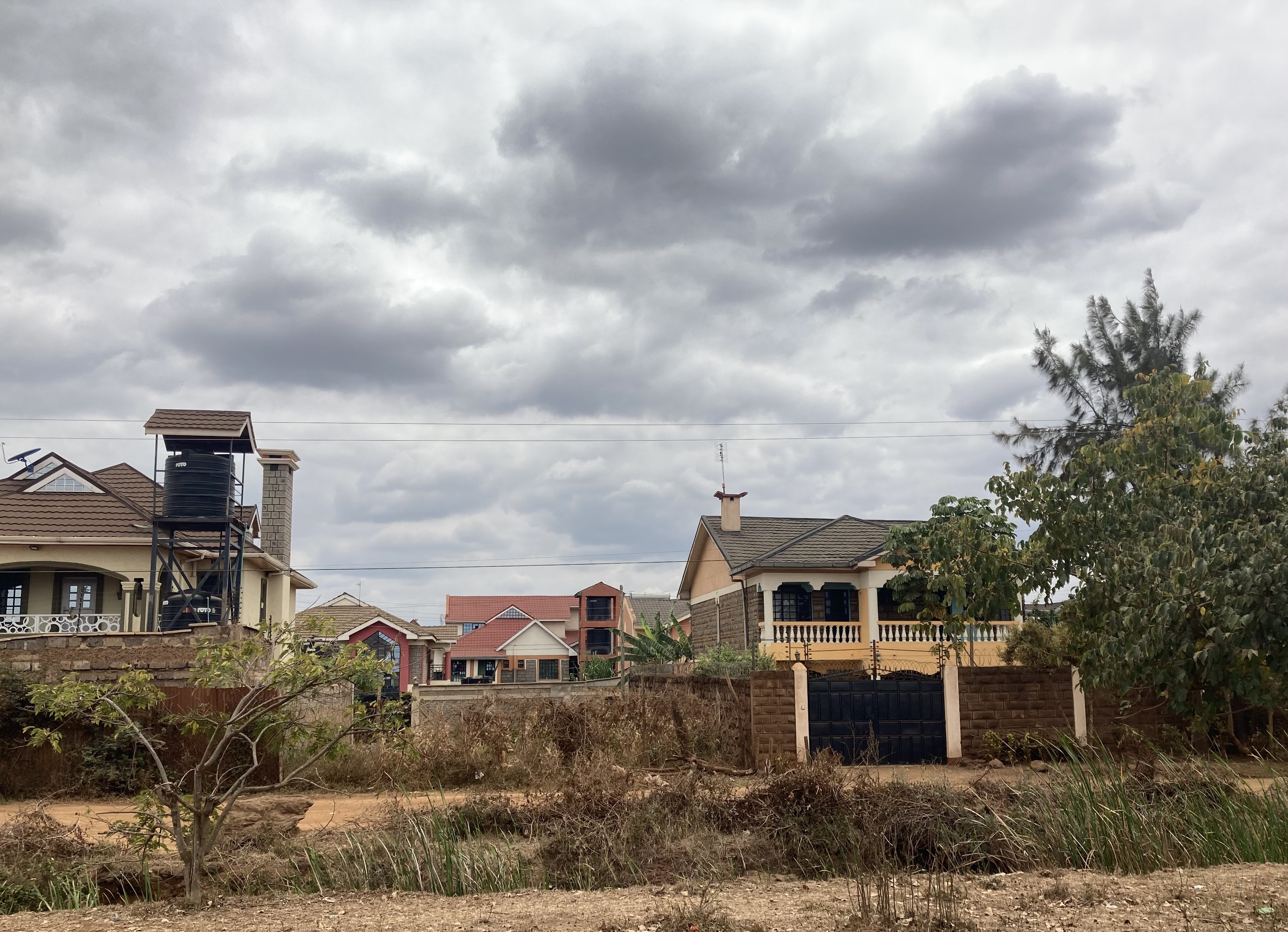
- Residential Houses in Membley Estate in Ruiru, Kenya

- Location within Kenya
- Coordinates: 1.163075°S 36.928708°E
- Country: Kenya
- District: Thika District
- Locality: Ruiru Municipality
- Division: Ruiru
- Constituency: Ruiru
- Established: 2000

Membley Estate is an upper middle-class suburb located near Nairobi, in the South-Western Ruiru Municipal area of Kiambu County. The suburb is located a short distance from Kenyatta University, Kamakis and Tatu City some 1.5 Kilometers from the Thika Road. The Membley Baptist, St. Lucia Catholic Church and ACK St Mathew's Membley Churches are found within this locality.

== Administration ==
Membley falls within the Ruiru Municipality Area (chartered in 2018) and hitherto the Nairobi Metropolitan Area. Administratively, the area falls within the Gitothua electoral ward of Ruiru Constituency, Kiambu County. The area is also domiciled within what was formerly Thika District.

== Education ==
Educational institutions within the estate include Danjose Academy, Focus Academy, Top Talents Academy, St. Beautah School, Fine Care Kindergarten, Membley High School and Ruiru Peak Academy

== Transport ==
Membley is served by the Nairobi Eastern Bypass Highway, Nairobi Northern Bypass Highway, and Thika Road.

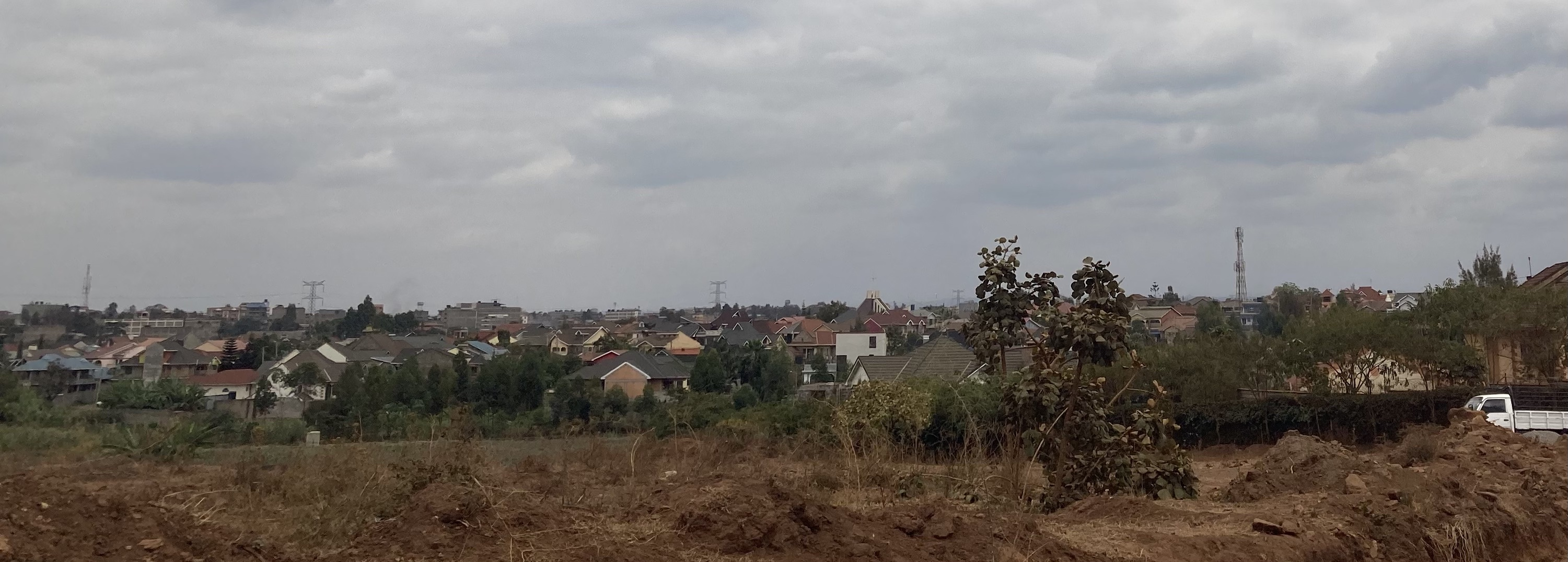
Wide View Photo of Membley Estate
