= Nairobi Western Bypass Highway =

Kenyan road

Coordinates: 01°13′52″S 36°40′19″E

Route information
- Length: 17 km (11 mi)
- History: Designated in 2019; Completed in 2022

Major junctions
- Southwest end: Gitaru
- Wangige; Kihara; Ndenderu; Rumingi
- Northeast end: Ruaka

Location
- Country: Kenya

Highway system
- Transport in Kenya

Nairobi Western Bypass Highway is a road in Kenya. It connects the town of Kikuyu to the town of Ruaka, both in Kiambu County.

== Location ==
This road starts in Gitaru, in near the town of Kikuyu, approximately 24 kilometres (15 mi), north-west of the central business district of Nairobi. The road travels in a general north-easterly direction through Wangige, Kihara, Ndenderu, Rumingi, to end at Ruaka, a total distance of about 16.5 kilometres (10 mi). At Ruaka, it will connect to the Nairobi Northern Bypass Highway through Limuru Road.

== Overview ==
This road is one of the four bypass highways built to direct motorized traffic away from the central business district of the city of Nairobi, to alleviate the perennial traffic jams on the city streets. The bypass highways include (a) Nairobi Northern Bypass Highway (b) Nairobi Eastern Bypass Highway (c) Nairobi Southern Bypass Highway and (d) Nairobi Western Bypass Highway. It is one of these four bypass roads that form a 96.7 kilometres (60 mi) ring-road around the city.

The Western Bypass development also involves the construction of 17.7 kilometres (11 mi) of service roads and walkways measuring 2 metres (6 ft 7 in) on both sides of the highway. A total of six interchanges and overpasses will be built, one each in the six townships where the four-lane dual carriageway is planned to pass. This way, the traffic on the highway will not interfere or be impeded by the surface traffic in the urban centers.

== Construction ==
The Nairobi Western Bypass Highway will cost an estimated KSh17.3 billion (US$173 million). In February 2019, China Road and Bridge Corporation, the selected contractor, began construction of this highway. Funding for this project was provided by the Exim Bank of China. Construction is expected to last 39 months.

== See also ==
- List of roads in Kenya
- List of bypass highways in Nairobi
