= Tatu City =

- City
- Location within Kenya
- Coordinates: 1.158751°S 36.907054°E
- Country: Kenya
- County: Kiambu County
- Locality: Ruiru – Kamiti Road
- Sub-County: Ruiru
- Constituency: Ruiru
- Established: 2011
- Founder: Rendeavor
- Website: Official website

Tatu City is a 5,000 acres (2,000 ha) mixed-use special economic zone (SEZ) located 20 kilometres (12 mi) North of Nairobi Central Business District (CBD) in the Ruiru Municipality area of Kiambu County. It sits within the greater Nairobi Metropolitan region and is a flagship project of the Kenya Vision 2030 blueprint.

== Administration ==
Tatu City is designated as a project of special importance by the Government of Kenya through The Physical Land Use Planning (Classification of Strategic and Inter-county Projects) Regulations of 2019 via the Kenya Gazette Vol.CXXI-No.73 (2019) under Gazette Notice 4975. It was also, in 2017, declared a Special Economic Zone under Gazette Notice 4892 published under the Kenya Gazette Vol. CXLX-No 66 of 22 May 2017. According to the Kenyan law, projects located within a Special Economic Zone context benefit from government-issued tax incentives among other benefits.

== Project progress ==
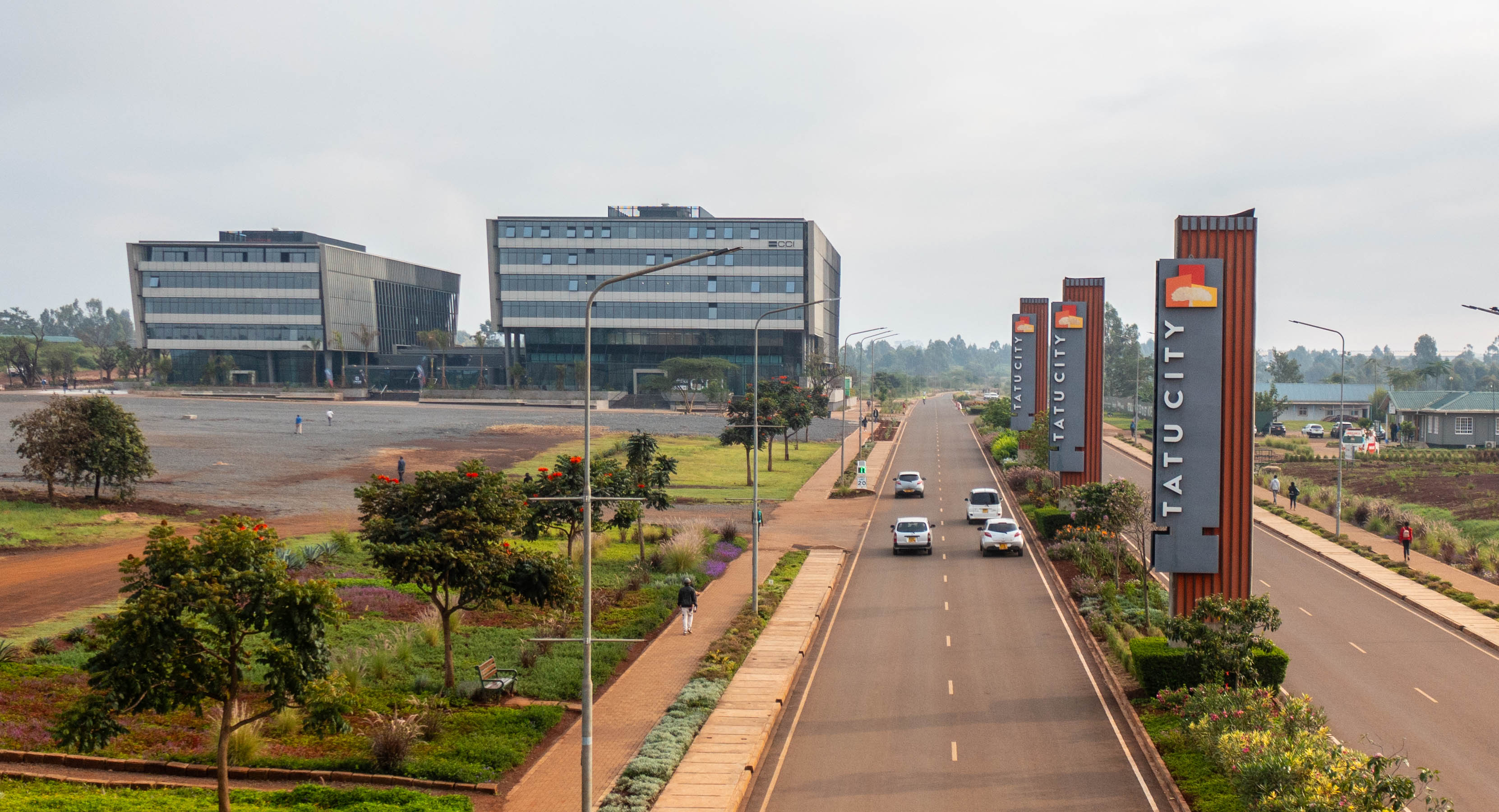
Tatu City

As of January 2025 the Tatu City SEZ is home to more than 100 business entities two international schools namely Nova Pioneer School and Crawford International School. The city is (as of January 2025) also home to various completed, ongoing, and proposed housing projects among them Kijani Ridge, Unity Homes, Karibu Homes, Tatu Waters, Jabali Towers, Next Amani and Lifestyle Estates.

Some of the companies with a presence in the Tatu City Industrial Park by 2025 include Heineken, Naivas, Dormans, Kärcher, Cooper K-Brands, Grit Real Estate Income Group, Hewatele, Freight Forwarders Solutions, Roast by Carnivore, CCI Global, ADvTECH, Friendship Group and Davis & Shirtliff among others.

== History ==
The land on which Tatu City sits was originally part of the Belgian Socfinaf coffee farm previously known as Tatu Estate before being acquired by Rendeavour in 2010. This is the same case with Northlands City and Kahawa Sukari tracts of land also in Ruiru which were originally owned by Socfinaf prior to being sold to new owners in the post-colonial era.

== Location ==
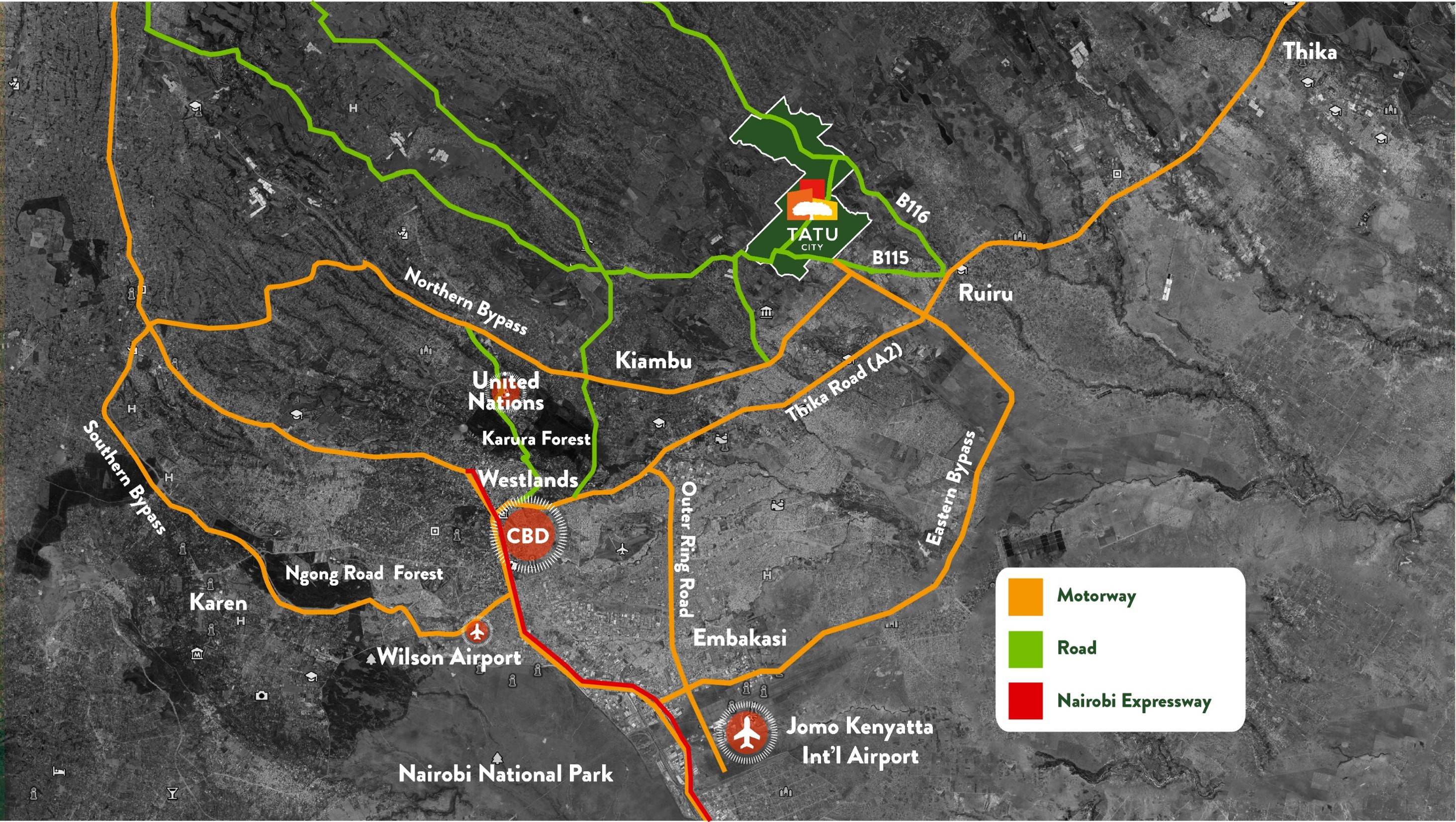
Tatu City Location Map

Tatu City can be accessed via Thika Road, Nairobi Eastern Bypass Highway, Nairobi Northern Bypass Highway, and the Kamiti Road. It is 30 minutes away from the Nairobi CBD, 40 minutes from the Jomo Kenyatta International Airport, 10 minutes from the Kasarani International Stadium, 5 minutes from Kamiti Prisons. The city is in close proximity to the Kenya Prisons Staff Training College (PSTC), Kenyatta University Teaching, Referral & Research Hospital (KUTRRH), Kamiti Maximum Security Prisons. It touches the Nairobi County boundary at its southerly-most tip at Kamiti River.

== Environment and parks ==
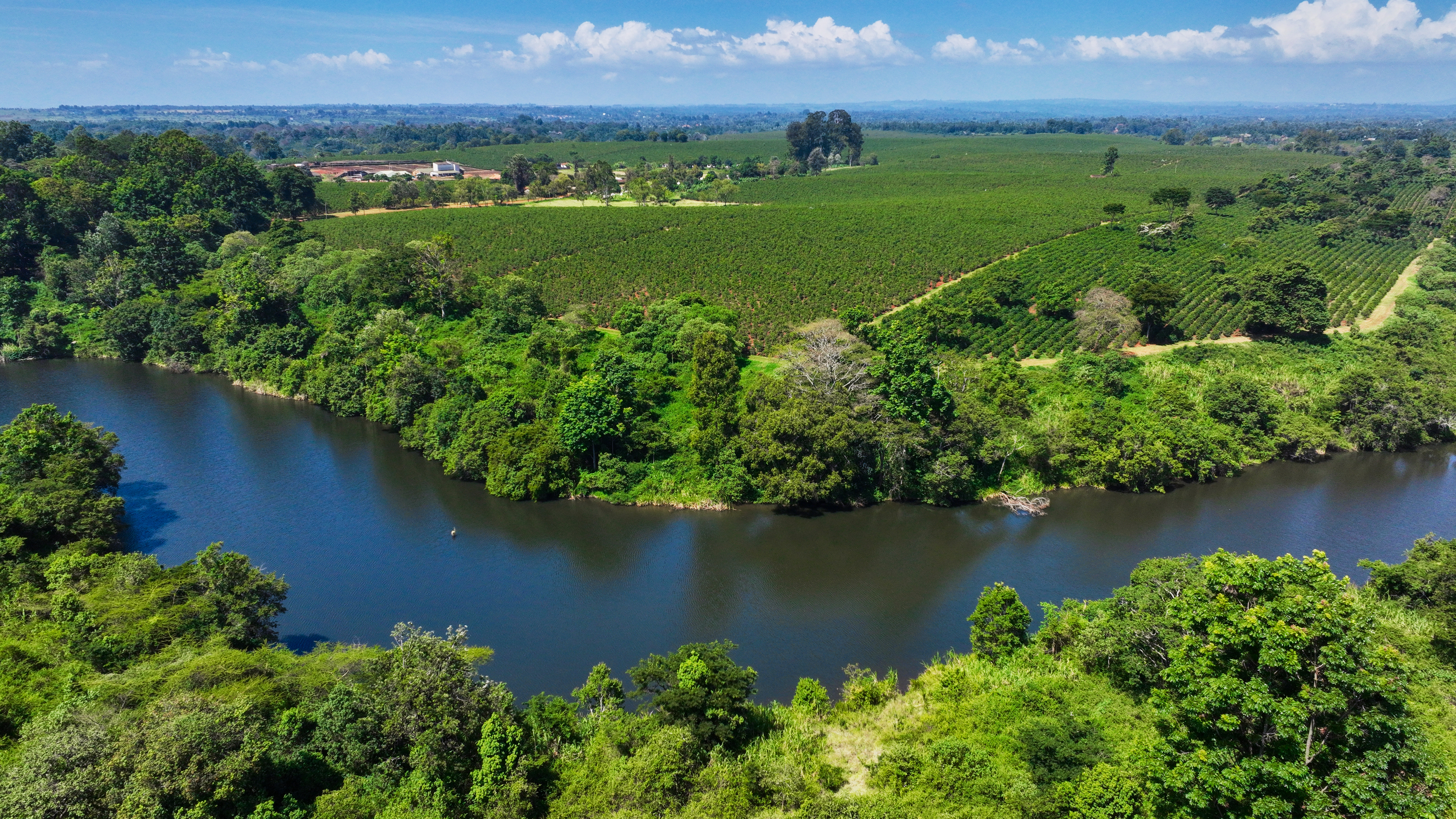
Nature

Tatu City lies within the relatively green side of Nairobi which is part of the greater Aberdare ecosystem. Thirty percent of the land is allocated to green spaces among them nature parks, nature trails, forests, coffee farms (to preserve the heritage of the place), and public amenities.

== Controversy ==
The project was in the middle of a long court battle due to shareholder wars in the period between 2013 and 2018. The matter was a major part of public discourse in the country and even attracted the attention of the Lands Committee of the National Assembly of Kenya which then absolved Tatu City of any wrongdoing.

== See also ==
- Konza Technopolis
- Kigali Innovation City
- Mwale Medical and Technology City
