= Nairobi Northern Bypass Highway =

Kenyan road

Coordinates: 01°12′55″S 36°51′22″E

Route information
- Length: 13 mi (21 km)
- History: Designated in 2009; Completion in 2014

Major junctions
- Southwest end: Ruaka
- Runda; Thindigua; Mirema; Kahawa
- Northeast end: Ruiru

Location
- Country: Kenya

Highway system
- Transport in Kenya

Nairobi Northern Bypass Highway is a road in Kenya.. It connects the neighbourhood of Ruaka to the neighborhood of Ruiru, both in Kiambu County.

== Location ==
This road starts in the Ruaka neighbourhood, approximately 16 kilometres (10 mi), north-west of the central business district of Nairobi. From Ruaka, the road travels in a general easterly direction through Runda. It briefly crosses into Kiambu County, passes above Kiambu Road, re-enters Nairobi County and continues to Marurui in Kasarani. At Marurui, the road takes a north-easterly direction, crosses Kamiti Road, then passes through Kahawa West and the Kenyatta University Hospital and re-enters Kiambu County at the Kamiti River bridge near Membley Estate and Kiwanja (Nairobi County) neighbourhoods. It ends at the intersection with the Nairobi Eastern Bypass Highway in Ruiru OJ neighbourhood. The highway distance is approximately 21 kilometres (13 mi), from end to end.

== Overview ==
This road is one of the four bypass highways built to direct motorized traffic away from the central business district of the city of Nairobi, to alleviate the perennial traffic jams on the city streets. The bypass highways include (a) Nairobi Western Bypass Highway (b) Nairobi Eastern Bypass Highway (c) Nairobi Southern Bypass Highway and (d) Nairobi Northern Bypass Highway. It is one of these four bypass roads that form a 96.7 kilometres (60 mi) ring-road around the city.

== Construction ==
The highway was constructed between 2009, and 2014, as a two-lane, single carriageway road. The work was performed by China Road and Bridge Corporation. Work on this road together with the 32 kilometres (20 mi) Nairobi Eastern Bypass Highway, was budgeted at KSh8.5 billion (US$85 million). The funding for both these roads was as illustrated in the table below.

Initial Construction Costs for Nairobi Northern and Eastern Bypass Highways
| Rank | Name of Development Partner | Funding in US$ | Percentage | Notes |
|---|---|---|---|---|
| 1 | Exim Bank of China | 72.25 | 85.0 | Loan |
| 2 | Government of Kenya | 12.75 | 15.0 | Equity |
| | Total | 85.0 | 100.0 | Total length 33 miles (53 km) |

== Expansion ==
In 2018, the Kenyan government contracted Sinohydro Limited to convert the Nairobi Northern Bypass Highway to a four-lane dual carriageway with culverts, drainage channels and walkways on both sides. It is estimated that dualling the Northern and Eastern Bypass Highways will cost anywhere from KSh30 billion to KSh40 billion (US$300 million to US$400 million). The process is on-going, as of March 2019.

== See also ==
- List of roads in Kenya
- List of bypass highways in Nairobi
