= List of bypass highways in Nairobi =

This is a list of bypass highways in Nairobi, aimed at re-directing traffic away from the city center, thereby de-congesting the city and alleviating the perennial traffic jams.

- Nairobi Northern Bypass Highway, linking Limuru Road to Thika Road
- Nairobi Eastern Bypass Highway, linking Nairobi-Mombasa Road to Ruiru-Kiambu Road near Kamiti Maximum Security Prison.
- Nairobi Southern Bypass Highway, which starts at the junction of the Nairobi–Mombasa Road and Likoni Road, approximately 10 kilometres (6 mi) south-east of the city centre. It then stretches to Gitaru, in the town of Kikuyu, in Kiambu County.
- Nairobi Western Bypass Highway, connects Gitaru, on the Southern Bypass to Ruaka on the Northern Bypass.

== See also ==
- Thika Road
- List of roads in Kenya
