= Ruaka =

Ruaka may refer to:

- Ruaka, Kiambu County, a town in Kiambu County, Kenya
- Ruaka (wrestler), Japanese professional wrestler
