= Ruiru =

Urban Area in Kiambu County, Kenya

- Town & Municipality
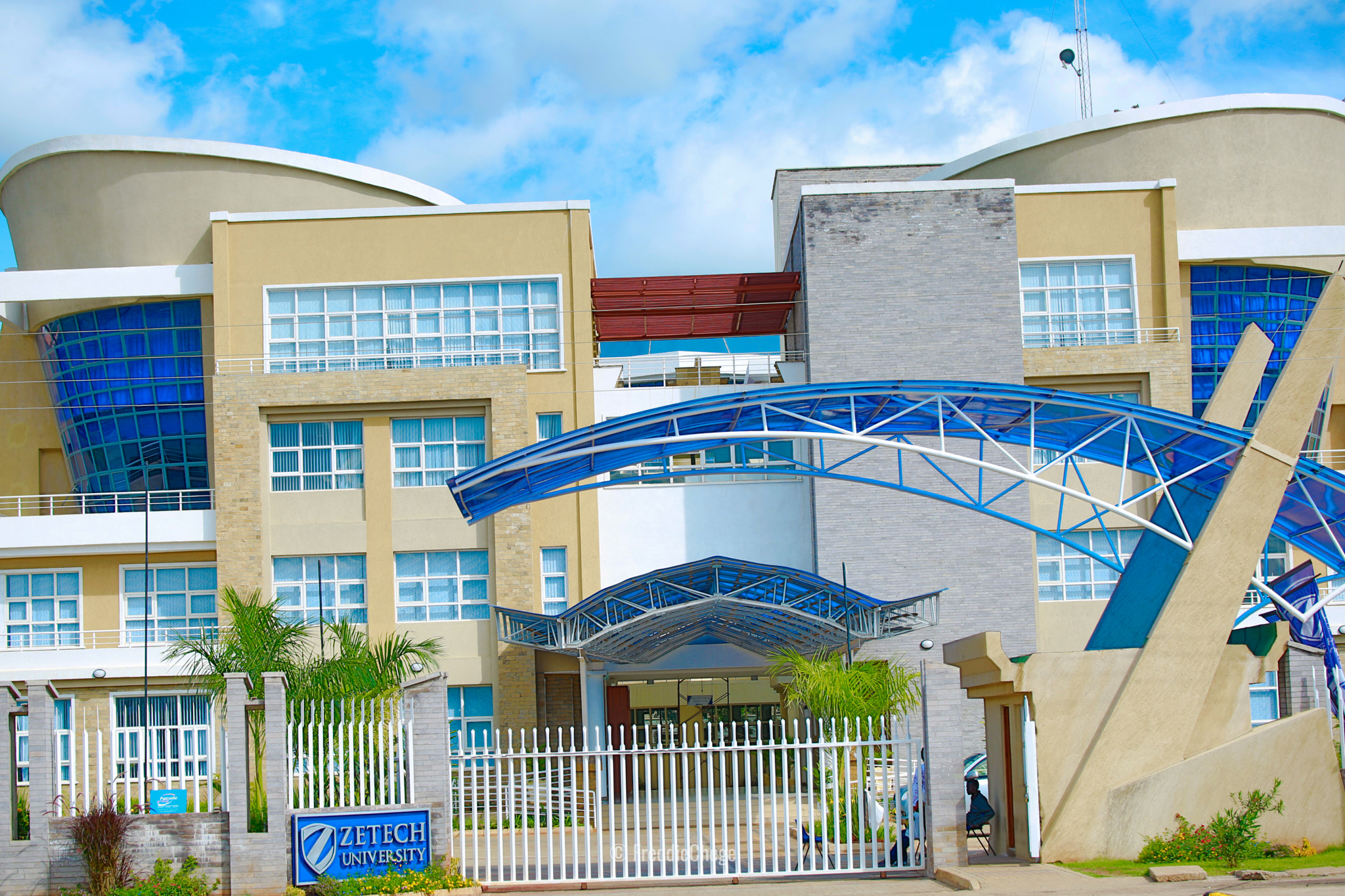
- Zetech University, Ruiru

- Location in Kenya
- Coordinates: 1.148326°S 36.960436°E
- Country: Kenya
- County: Kiambu County

Area
  - Land: 292 km^{2} (113 sq mi)
- Elevation: 1,565 m (5,135 ft)

Population (2019)
  - Total: 371,111
- Time zone: UTC+3 (EAT)
- Postal code: 00232
- Area code: 145
- Climate: Cwb

Ruiru is a municipality and sub-county in Kiambu County, Kenya. It sits within the greater Nairobi Metropolitan region. According to the 2019 national population census, Ruiru was the 4th largest urban centre in Kenya by population. The name Ruiru is of the Kikuyu origin and possibly relates to the black cotton soil that is found in most parts of Ruiru.

== Location ==
Ruiru is about 20 kilometres (12 mi) by road northeast of the central business district of Nairobi, the nation's capital city. The sub-county measures 292 km2 (113 sq mi) and is connected to Nairobi by road and rail. The geographical coordinates of Ruiru are 1°10'04.0"S, 36°58'24.0" E (Latitude: −1.167778; Longitude: 36.973333). The municipality sits at an average elevation of 1,565 metres (5,135 ft) above sea level.

== History ==
This area was a sisal and coffee-growing district with sisal on either side of the river to the right of the main road to Thika. It is now a housing area. There used to be four main manager houses on the estate on the south side of the river. The area was given over to an African consortium to be developed into smallholdings in the 1970s.

Before Kenya's independence, Ruiru was administered under the Nairobi City Council and referred to as the Western Rural District. After independence, the area was put under the administration of the Kiambu County Council before being elevated to a town council in 1986. In 1997, Ruiru was upgraded to municipality status comprising nine elective wards: Biashara, Gitothua, Gatongora, Kahawa Sukari, Githurai, Kimbo, Jacaranda, Theta, Viwanda, and Murera.

The creation of the Nairobi Metropolitan Region (NMR) by an Executive Order in May 2008 put the town under its broader urban integrated plan.

== Neighbourhoods ==
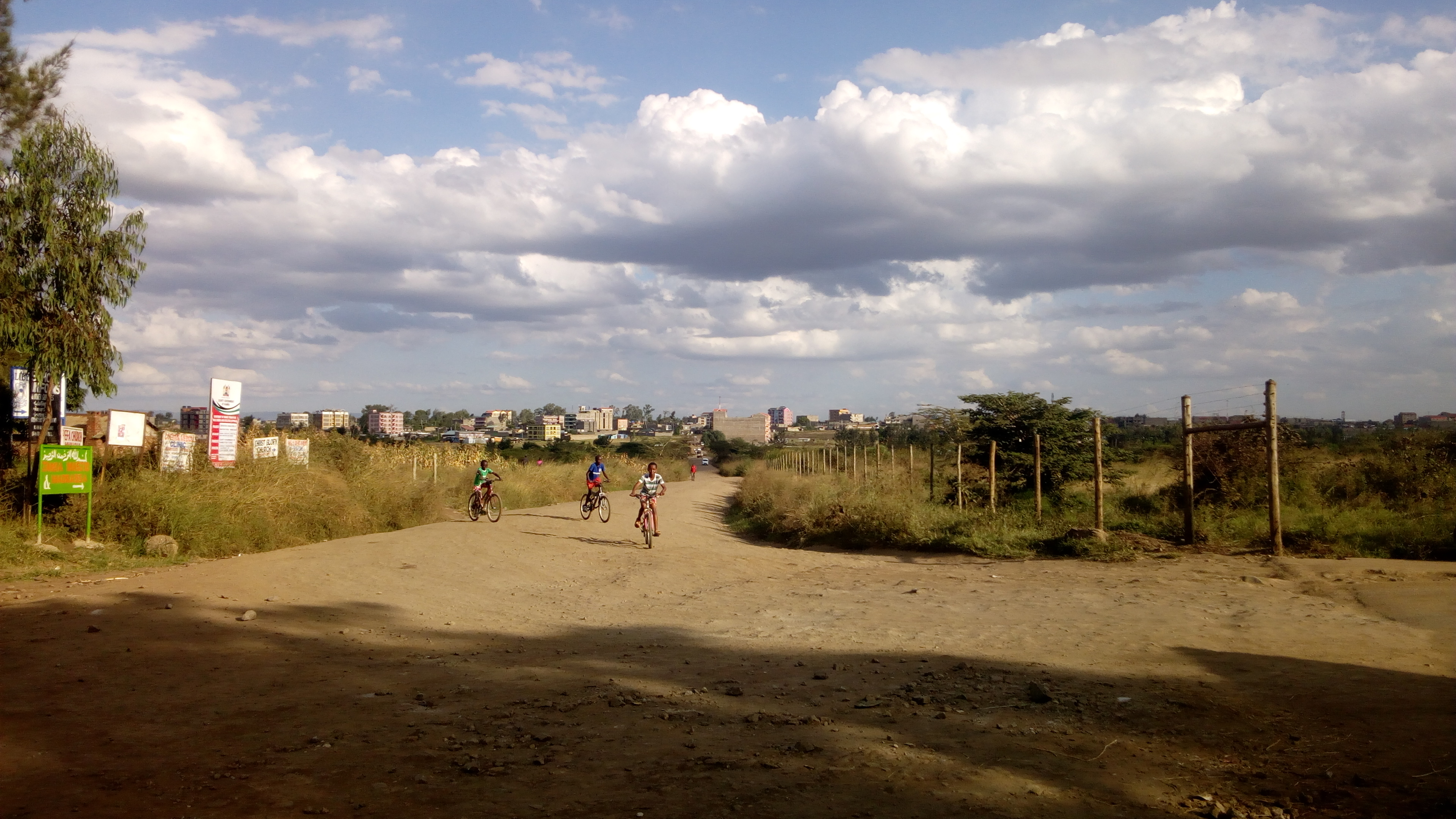
Landscape in Mwihoko Ward

Ruiru Municipality encompasses an extensive and rapidly developing urban area, characterised by a diverse mix of established residential estates, emerging housing developments and planned urban communities. Its neighbourhoods reflect varying residential settings and socioeconomic backgrounds, ranging from established middle-income and high-density settlements to modern gated communities and large-scale mixed-use developments. The municipality's continued urban expansion has contributed to its growing importance as a residential and commercial centre within the Nairobi metropolitan area.

NEIGHBOURHOODS AND RESIDENTIAL AREAS
Kiambu County flag	Githurai; Mwiki; Mwihoko; Kahawa (Kahawa Wendani and Kahawa Sukari); Kamakis; Northlands City; Membley; Ruiru Ojay; Tatu City
LANDMARKS
Nairobi Eastern Bypass Highway; Nairobi Northern Bypass Highway; Thika Superhighway; Kenyatta University; Zetech University; Ruiru River; Ruiru Railway Station; Ruiru Stadium; Ruiru Level IV Hospital; Ruiru Open Air Market

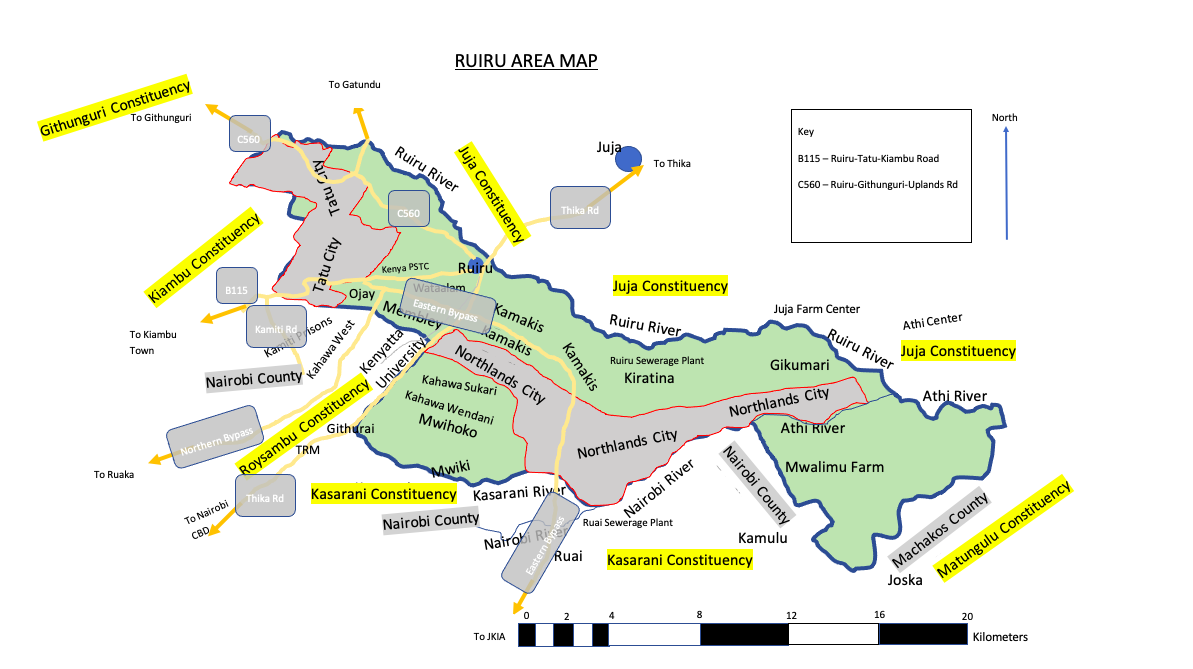
Ruiru Constituency Area, 2022

== Economy ==
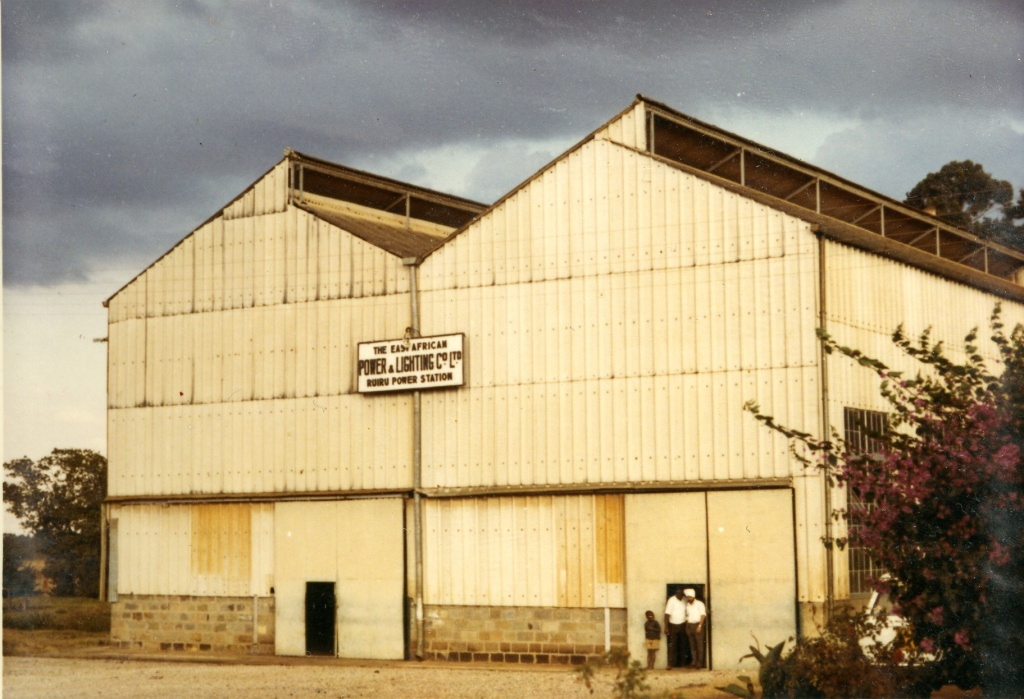
East African Power & Lighting building in Ruiru on the Nairobi-Thika highway, taken in about 1960

Ruiru is an industrial town with several major factories, including Devki Steel Mills, Super Foam Limited, Spinners & Spinners Garment Factory, Ruiru Mabati Factory, and Ruiru Feeds Limited.

The Tatu City Industrial Park is found within Ruiru and is home to many factories, including BIDCO, Copia, Dormans, Davis & Shirtliff, Tianlong, Stecol, and Dr. Mattress.

Banks and shopping malls serve the town. It has seen a housing boom, with many coffee estates converted into residential areas, including an upcoming multi-billion Tatu Estate. Information and communication technology businesses are also emerging, including SmartEdge PASHA Center, a digital village where the community can buy computers and find free training.

Several banks have opened their branches in Ruiru, particularly in the Kamakis area, including NCBA, Sidian Bank, Diamond Trust Bank, Equity Bank and Co-operative Bank.

== Infrastructure projects ==
Ruiru is home to major government and private infrastructure developments, including Tatu City, a 5,000-acre mixed-use project. The proposed Northlands City project is also found in this area.

Prominent government-led infrastructure projects in Ruiru include the Ruiru Sewer Plant, the Nairobi Eastern Bypass Highway dualling, and the Nairobi commuter rail service project.

== Population ==
In 2009, Ruiru's population was 238,858. Ten years later, the 2019 national census found that the population was 490,120, making it the fourth-largest urban center in Kenya by population. The rapid population growth is attributable to several factors: the shortage of affordable housing in Nairobi; the infrastructure development, especially Thika Road and Nairobi Eastern Bypass Highway, and the associated commercial and residential development that followed the new highways; and the presence of university campuses in or near Ruiru.

Historical population
Year	Pop.	±%
1969	1,674	—
1979	1,718	+2.6%
1989	23,316	+1257.2%
1999	79,741	+242.0%
2009	238,329	+198.9%
2019	490,120	+105.6%

== Education ==
Two universities have their main campuses in Ruiru: Zetech University and Kiriri Women's University of Science and Technology. The Kenyatta University (Main and Ruiru Campuses) is also near the municipality. The University of Nairobi and other higher education institutions have campuses in or near Ruiru. Danjose Academy, one of the leading academic primary institutions, is located in Ruiru. In July 2022, the President of Kenya, Uhuru Kenyatta, broke ground in Ruiru for the Amref International University. The Health Science University will be hosted within the expansive Northlands City land in the municipality's southern wing.

== Politics ==
Ruiru was originally part of the greater Juja Constituency until it was hived off and made into an independent electoral area. It is separated from Juja by the Ruiru River as it flows downstream to the confluence with the Nairobi River.

Esther Gathogo was a Member of Parliament from 2013 to 2017. Simon Ng'ang'a King'ara won the seat in the August 2017 general election.

== Notable people ==
- Amos Nondi, footballer

== See also ==
- Konza
- Mwale Medical and Technology City
- Westlands
