= Elizabeth Itotia =

Kenyan nuclear pharmacist (born 1992)

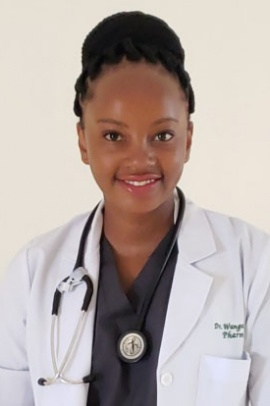
- Itoita in 2017
- Born: c. 1992 (age 33–34); Kenya
- Education: University of Nairobi (Bachelor of Pharmacy); Sefako Makgatho Health Sciences University (Master of Pharmacy in Nuclear Pharmacy
- Occupation: Radiopharmacist
- Years active: 2020–present
- Title: Radiopharmacist at Kenyatta University Hospital

Elizabeth Wangari Itotia (born c. 1992) is a nuclear pharmacist from Kenya. She is the first Kenyan woman to qualify as a nuclear pharmacist (also referred to as a radiopharmacist). As of July 2021, she is one of only three similarly qualified people in that country, the others being male. She is currently employed as a member of the nuclear pharmacy team at Kenyatta University Teaching, Referral and Research Hospital (KUTRRH).

== Early life and education ==
Itotia was born in 1992, in Limuru, in present-day Kiambu County to a farming family. Itotia joined Loreto Kiambu Girls' High School, where she scored a straight A in KCSE and was admitted to the University of Nairobi to study pharmacy. She graduated at the top of her class in 2017 (58th graduation valedictorian), with a Bachelor of Pharmacy (BPharm) degree.

She was awarded a scholarship by the International Atomic Energy Agency to pursue a master's degree. She was admitted to Sefako Makgatho Health Sciences University in Pretoria, South Africa, where she graduated in 2021 with a Master of Pharmacy (MPharm) degree, specializing in Nuclear Pharmacy.

== Career ==
After her first degree, Itotia joined Kenyatta University Hospital for the mandatory one-year supervised work period. While there, an opportunity arose for her to pursue higher studies on scholarship. She chose nuclear pharmacy because KUTRRH is increasingly attending to large numbers of cancer patients, who require sophisticated diagnostic and treatment modalities in the nuclear medicine and nuclear radiology arenas. After completing her master's degree, she returned to Kenyatta University Hospital to practice.

Itotia is a member of the Pharmaceutical Society of Kenya.
