= Zetech University =

Private university in Kiambu County, Kenya

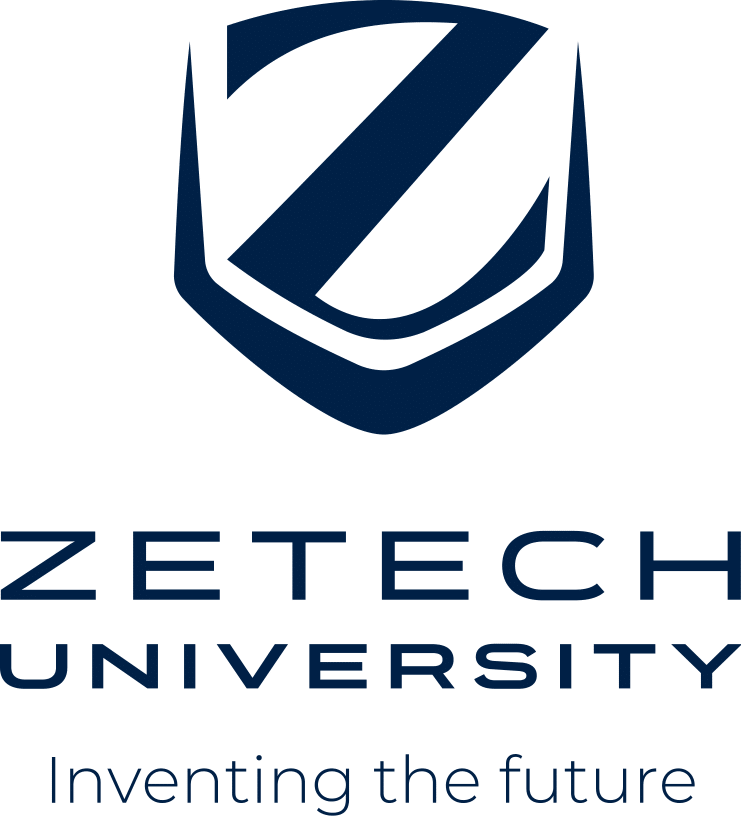
- Motto: Inventing the future
- Type: Private University
- Established: 1997
- Chancellor: Professor Susan Alfano, PhD
- Vice-Chancellor: Professor Njenga Munene, PhD
- Administrative staff: 250
- Location: Thika Road, Ruiru, Nairobi, Kenya; 1.2630°S 36.8036°E
- Website: www.zetech.ac.ke

Zetech University is a private university in Kiambu County, Kenya.

The University offers Certificate, Diploma, Degree, Master, and PhD programmes with flexible learning modes including Elearning, Part-time and full-time.

In its early years, ZU collaborated with the Jomo Kenyatta University of Agriculture and Technology to offer various programmes from the institution, but after receiving a Letter of Interim Authority to operate as a University in 2014, It started to offer its own programmes. The University is approved by The Commission for University Education and awarded the charter in August 2022 by the President of Kenya H.E. President Uhuru Kenyatta.

The University comprises five schools:

- School of Business and Economics
- School of ICT, Media and Engineering
- School of Education, Arts and Social Sciences
- School of Health Sciences
- Zetech Law School

The current chancellor is Professor Susan Alfano, and the Vice Chancellor is Professor Njenga Munene.

== About Zetech ==
Zetech University is a private institution of higher learning located in Kenya. The University was established in 1997 and began offering degree programmes in 2014. It is a fully chartered, accredited, and ISO-certified university, committed to delivering high-quality education through a team of qualified, skilled, and motivated academic and professional staff.

The University campuses are equipped with spacious and accessible lecture rooms housed in well-designed tuition blocks. Zetech University also boasts modern infrastructure, including fully equipped ICT laboratories, Human Anatomy Laboratory, Biology, Chemistry and Physics Laboratories, a Media Studio, a state-of-the-art kitchen, and a Moot Court that supports practical learning and research.

To nurture talent beyond academics, the University supports clubs, societies, and facilities in music, drama, arts, and sports for students, staff, and the wider community.

The University community includes approximately 10,000 students, 400 staff members, and an active alumni network of about 75,000 graduates.

== History ==
Although Zetech University was officially founded in 1999, The institute had been offering basic IT training from a University of Nairobi dorm room since 1997, where the institute operated under the name Zenith Technologies while the founder was pursuing his undergraduate studies at the University. At the time, computing technology was fairly new in Kenya.

In 1999 the institute leased office space in Summit House and registered as an academic institution under the name Zetech College – a fusion of the words 'Zenith' and 'Technology'. The college initially offered ICT based courses and has grown over the years to an accredited University by the Commission for University Education.

== Campuses ==
Zetech University has four campuses, the Ruiru Campus is located off Thika road in Ruiru, about 20 km from the capital city of Nairobi, Technology Park Mang'u Campus located in Mang'u, Nairobi City Campus hosted at Stanbank and Pioneer buildings along Moi Avenue in Nairobi CBD, and the digital elearning online campus, Zetech Digital School (ZDS).

== Library ==
The 750-seat facility comprises approximately 2,500 titles and incorporates computer-based learning support facilities to provide access to up-to-date research information. The library also features wi-fi Internet access as well as an automated Integrated Library System. The same library collections are also housed in Nairobi City Campus and Technology Park Mang'u Campus.

The University provides extensive learning resources through its computer facilities and a well-stocked library offering both physical and digital books, journals, and academic materials. Zetech University publishes two academic journals: The Zetech Journal of Business and Technology and The Zetech Journal of Law and Technology.

== Academic Programmes ==
Zetech University offers a wide range of certificate, diploma, degree and postgraduate programmes to government-sponsored and privately-funded students.

== Admission ==
The University has intakes in January, May and September, enrolling both Government and self-sponsored students.Applications can be done online via https://sajili.zetech.ac.ke/

== Research Institutes ==
To promote innovation and research, the University hosts several research and innovation centres, including:

- Institute of Ageing Studies
- Africa Centre for Data Analytics and Modelling
- Agritech and Innovation Hub
- Zetech University Innovation, Entrepreneurship and Technology (iZET) Hub

== Sports and Recreation ==
The University has robust football, basketball, rugby, volleyball and martial arts teams currently playing in the Kenya Women Premier League, Kenya Rugby Union, Kenya Basketaball Leagues, FKF Division One League, Kenya Universities Sports Association (KUSA) League among other tournaments. The football men's and ladies' teams are the reigning Universities and Colleges Football Leagues (UCFL) champions having won the 2018–19 titles while the basketball ladies team are the current defending champions of National Universities Championship in Kenya. Other sporting activities that students engage in include Scrabble, chess, table tennis, FIFA among others.

== Clubs and Societies ==
- Zetech University Students Association (ZUSA)
- Information Technology Club
- Furnace Drama and Music Club
- Zetech University Knowledge Ambassadors (ZUKA)
- Innovation and mentorship hub
- Zetech Christian Union
- Zetech Lions Club
- Engineering Club
- Entrepreneurs Club
- Hotel Club
- Tourism Club
- Journalism Club
- Community Development Club
- Arts Club
- Ajira Club

== Health and Counseling ==
The University offers a Health and Counseling Centre which operates as a single service provider for professional medical and counseling services to students. The facility is open from 8 am to 6 pm and can handle emergencies such as chest pain, seizures, and injuries. They also educate students on various health emergency procedures for emergency purposes.

== Scholarships ==
Sports Scholarship

The Zetech University Sports Scholarship Programme provides educational support to students who demonstrate sporting talent while pursuing academic qualifications. The programme forms part of the university's approach to combining higher education with participation in competitive sport.

The scholarship initiative encompasses disciplines including football, basketball, rugby and volleyball. The University identifies prospective beneficiaries through sporting competitions and talent scouting activities, including events organised under the Kenya Secondary Schools Sports Association (KSSSA).

In 2024, Zetech University reported an allocation of KSh 10 million towards scholarships for talented athletes identified through secondary school sports competitions. The initiative included opportunities for selected athletes to receive full academic sponsorship.

The University's sports programme also supports student participation in university, national and regional sporting competitions.

TechSheria Scholarship

The TechSheria Scholarship is a tuition scholarship initiative introduced by Zetech University through Zetech Law School in 2026. The programme provides financial support to academically qualified students from economically disadvantaged backgrounds who wish to pursue a Bachelor of Laws (LL.B) degree.

The scholarship covers the full tuition fees of selected beneficiaries. Its selection criteria include academic achievement, financial need, interest in legal studies and demonstrated leadership potential.

For the 2026 application cycle, applicants were required to have completed the Kenya Certificate of Secondary Education (KCSE) in 2025, attained a minimum overall grade of C+ and achieved at least a B in English or Kiswahili.

The initiative received coverage from the Kenya News Agency and Education News Kenya following its introduction in April 2026. In September 2026, the University announced its first three scholarship beneficiaries: Nelson Muuo Mutuku, Jane Muthoni Wambui and Ronney Okello.

The scholarship is associated with the University's efforts to widen participation in legal education, particularly among students facing financial barriers to university study.
