= Kamakis =

Urban Area in Kiambu County, Kenya

- Urban
- Location in Kenya
- Coordinates: 1.169823°S 36.970401°E
- Country: Kenya
- County: Kiambu County
- District: Ruiru
- Division: Githurai
- Ward: Gatong'ora
- Locality: Nairobi Eastern Bypass
- Elevation: 1,520 m (4,990 ft)

Population (2019)
  - Total: 41,060
- Time zone: UTC+3 (EAT)
- Postal code: 00232
- Area code: 145 (B)
- Climate: Cwb

Kamakis (or Kamaki's) is an area located along the Nairobi Eastern Bypass Highway. Often referred to as "Nairobi's Nyama Choma Belt", the area is administratively in Ruiru, Kiambu County which by extension falls within the greater Nairobi Metropolitan Region.

== Commerce ==
Kamakis started off as a Nyama choma (grilled meat) shopping center, often getting recognized among popular Nyama Choma joints in Kenya.

With time, thanks to its strategic location, it metamorphosed into a commercial center featuring top-tier banks, fast-food joints like KFC and modern-day infrastructure.

Danjose Academy, one of the leading academic primary institutions, is located in Ruiru, Kamakis

As of 2023, banks like DTB and hospitals like the Aga Khan University Hospital had since set up shop in the area.
