= Uhuru Gardens =

Commemorative park in Nairobi, Kenya

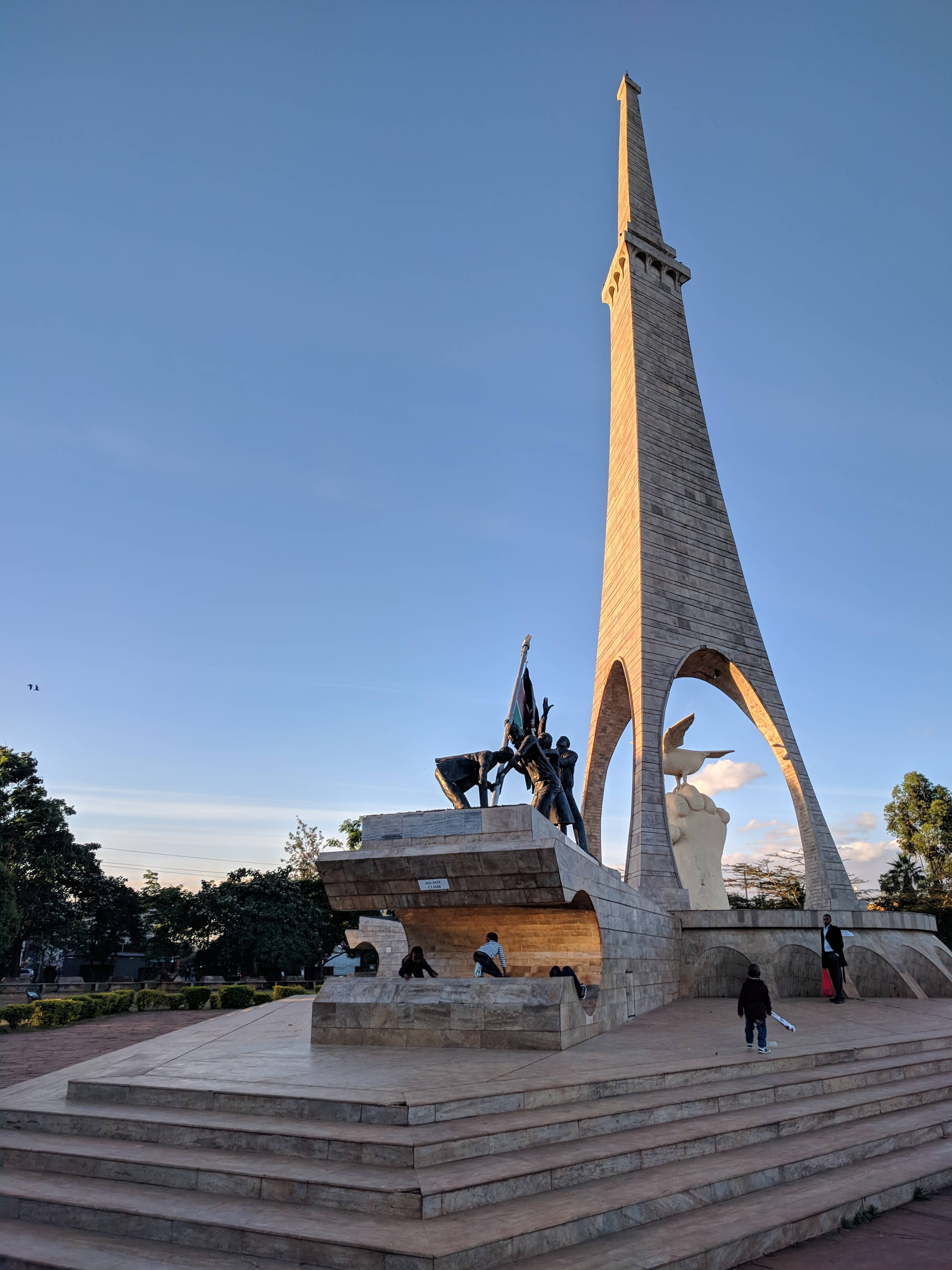
- Monument and flag-raising structure in the gardens
- Interactive map of Uhuru Gardens
- Type: Memorial
- Location: Nairobi, Kenya
- Coordinates: 1.3205009°S 36.7961151°E
- Area: 63 acres
- Opened: September 1965
- Etymology: "Freedom" (Swahili)
- Owner: Kenya Defense Forces

Uhuru Gardens National Monument and Museum is a commemorative park and museum in Nairobi, Kenya that celebrates independence from the British Empire on 12 December 1963. The word "uhuru" is Swahili for "freedom". It contains three points of significance:

- The Mũgumo tree (Ficus sycomorus), purportedly planted in the exact location the Union Jack, or more likely the former Flag of the Colony of Kenya, was removed and the Flag of Kenya was placed. The tree is also of significance to the Kikuyu people.
- The independence commemorative monument, built in 1973, is a twenty-four meter high column, supporting a pair of clasped hands and a dove of peace. This point celebrates the declaration of independence at midnight, 12 December 1963. It also celebrates the inauguration of Kenya's first president, Jomo Kenyatta, in the same night. On one side of this monument is a statue of soldiers raising the Kenyan flag.
- A fountain celebrating "Twenty-Five years of Uhuru – peace, love and unity monument".
