= Nairobi Southern Bypass Highway =

Kenyan road

Coordinates: 01°19′35″S 36°44′48″E

Route information
- Length: 29.6 km (18.4 mi)
- History: Designated in June 2012; Completion in November 2016

Major junctions
- Southeast end: Mombasa Road at Likoni Road
- Uhuru Gardens; Ngong Road; Muguga
- Northwest end: Gitaru

Location
- Country: Kenya

Highway system
- Transport in Kenya

The Nairobi Southern Bypass Highway is a road in Kenya, forming a semi-circle through the south-western neighbourhoods of the capital city of Nairobi. The road allows traffic from Mombasa, destined for western Kenya and Uganda to bypass downtown Nairobi, thereby reducing traffic congestion in the city's central business district.

== Location ==
The road starts at the junction of the Nairobi–Mombasa Road and Likoni Road, approximately 10 kilometres (6 mi) south-east of the city centre. The road then loops through the south-western suburbs of Nairobi, including the northern environs of Nairobi National Park, Uhuru Gardens, Lang'ata and Dagoretti. In Dagoretti, the road enters Kiambu County and then turns northwards, to pass through Muguga and end in the town of Kikuyu, in a suburb known as Gitaru. At that location, the road connects with the Nairobi-Malaba Road (A104).

The total length of the Nairobi Southern Bypass Highway is approximately 29.6 kilometres (18 mi).

== Overview ==
This road is intended to relieve traffic congestion in the capital city's central business district, by diverting long-distance traffic from and to the port city to Mombasa, destined for western Kenya and the land-locked countries of Uganda, Rwanda, Burundi, South Sudan and the eastern parts of the Democratic Republic of the Congo.

In a similar effort, other bypass highways have been built on the northern and eastern sides of Nairobi, with the objective of alleviating downtown traffic congestion.

== Construction ==
The Kenya National Highway Authority (KeNHA), selected China Road and Bridge Corporation to construct the four-lane dual carriageway highway, at a cost of US$180 million (KSh18 billion). The construction was funded by the government of Kenya together with the Export Import Bank of China, as illustrated in the table below. The completed road was commissioned by the president of Kenya, Uhuru Kenyatta and his guest, the president of Tanzania, John Magufuli, on 2 November 2016.

Funding for Nairobi Southern Bypass Highway
Rank	Development Partner	Contribution in US$	Percentage	Notes
1	Exim Bank of China	153 million	85.0	Loan
2	Government of Kenya	27 million	15.0	Investment
	Total	180.0 million	100.0	

== See also ==
- East African Community
- List of roads in Kenya
- Nairobi Bypasses
