= Kenyatta University Hospital =

Kenyatta University Teaching, Research & Referral Hospital
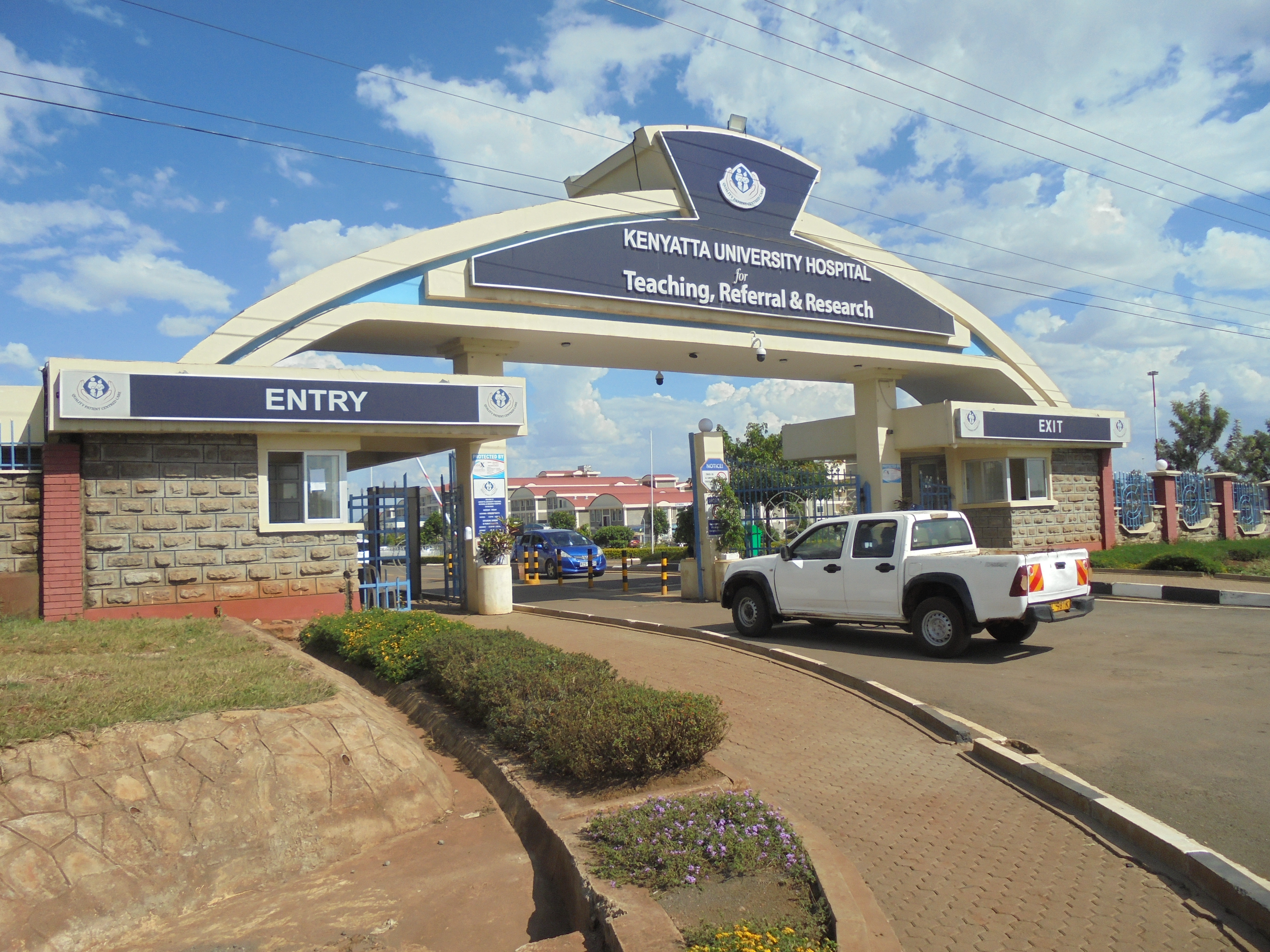

Geography
- Location: Kahawa West, Nairobi Northern Bypass Highway, Nairobi, Kenya
- Coordinates: 01°10′33″S 36°54′57″E

Organisation
- Care system: NHIF
- Type: Public, Referral and Teaching
- Affiliated university: Kenyatta University Medical School

Services
- Emergency department: Yes
- Beds: 650

History
- Founded: 2019; 7 years ago

Links
- Website: kutrrh.go.ke
- Other links: Kenyatta University

The Kenyatta University Teaching, Referral & Research Hospital (KUTRRH) sometimes called Kenyatta University Hospital is a Kenyan National Referral Hospital with a 650-bed capacity. The hospital is equipped to offer specialized Oncology, Trauma & Orthopedics, Renal, Accident & Emergency, among other services but the oncology center is its flagship project. The hospital was officially opened by President Uhuru Kenyatta on 10th of September 2020 though it had been in operation since October 2019. The hospital has an integrated molecular imaging center which helps in the treatment and diagnosis of cancer, one of the major reasons Kenyans travel abroad to seek.

== Location ==
The hospital is located on a 100-acre piece of land that lies along the Nairobi Northern Bypass road, in the Northwestern part of the Kenyatta University. The main entrance is along the Northern Bypass road. The geographical coordinates of the hospital are: 01°10'33.0"S, 36°54'57.0"E.

== Administration ==
The acting Chief Executive Officer since August 2025 is Richard Lesiyampe Leserian.

== Medical breakthroughs ==
On 24 September 2026, it became the first African hospital to successfully perform a tubeless windpipe reconstruction (a form of Laryngotracheal reconstruction) to treat a benign adenoma on a 26 year old male patient. The operation took five hours.
