= Mwale Medical and Technology City =

- Location within Kenya
- Coordinates: 0°16′02.8″N 34°33′04.7″E
- Country: Kenya
- County: Kakamega
- Sub-county: Butere
- Mission: 2007-2012
- Founded: 2014
- Founder: Julius Mwale

Government
  - Type: Integrated Master Development Plan
  - Body: Board of supervisors

Area
  - Total: 2,000 ha (5,000 acres)
- Elevation: 1,423 m (4,669 ft)

Mwale Medical and Technology City (commonly abbreviated as MMTC) is a planned, community-owned sustainable city located in Butere, Kakamega County, Kenya. The development is centered on a large medical complex, anchored by Hamptons Hospital, which has a reported capacity of 5,000 patients. The city also includes a research and innovation park situated within its Plaza district.

MMTC comprises several functional districts, including an industrial area anchored by a solar power plant, and residential zones that incorporate amenities such as a 36-hole golf course. A commercial district features shopping malls, supermarkets, and hotels, while an airport district has been planned to facilitate patient evacuation to the hospital, including a proposed cable car system.

According to Julius Mwale, the founder of MMTC, the project has cost US$2 billion.

== History ==
=== Phases of development ===
==== Phase 1 (2014-2016) ====
Phase 1 spanned 2014-2016, during which the Hamptons Mall was constructed. It contains 90,000 square feet (8,400 m^{2}) of housing; a supermarket; a cafe.

==== Phase 2 (2016-2017) ====
Phase 2 was constructed from 2016 to 2017. It included 70 kilometres (43 mi) of roads and solar powered street lights.

Some sources say phase 2 also included 4,800 houses intended for doctors and nurses. Other sources say these homes were planned to be part of phase 3. It also included the Hamptons hospital. Some sources say phase 2 included 5000 beds. This would make it one of the largest hospitals in the world. Others say only the first section of the hospital including the cancer treatment centre were part of phase 2 with other departments to be added in phase 3.

==== Phase 3 (2017-) ====
Phase 3 commenced in September 2017. The phase was planned to be finished by the end of 2020.

It was planned to include a 36-hole golf course; a convention centre; an airport; and a second shopping mall. Later sources also say phase 3 will include a biomass power plant.

=== Hamptons Hospital ===
Hamptons Hospital was opened in July 2019. NTV Kenya reported this as the commissioning of the cancer centre. Kenya News Agency reported it as a "cancer hospital" having "opened [its] doors to outpatients". The also reported that Dr Simiyu, the hospital's CEO, said the hospital would begin accepting patients that day and the "advanced diagnostic centre" would be operationalised "soon".

In April 2020, it was announced that Hamptons Hospital would provide 40 beds (10 of which would be ICU beds with ventilators) for Covid-19 patients as well as testing facilities.

Hamptons hospital acquired Kshs. 21 billion (US$200 million) equipment in 2021.

It distributed free solar street lights to schools and the entire county. One billion shillings (US$10 million) have been spent on a community lighting program in Kakamega County.

Ambulatory services were launched to provide emergency care to residents in the western region of Kenya.

In 2022, it opened a maternity ward.

As part of a 2023 Mediapart investigation, journalists contacted the hospital and were told the Advanced Cancer Treatment and Diagnostic Centre was not operational and that the facility saw under a hundred people a day, primarily for malaria treatment. As of January 2025, the Ministry of Health lists it as having 45 inpatient beds.

The hospital provides free treatment to Kenyans with Social Health Authority (SHA) cards. It is SHA accredited.

=== Planning Dispute ===
Kakamega County authorities accused the project of violating the Physical Planning Act, the Public Health Act on Housing and Sanitation, the County Government Act, and the County Land Registration Act. Tumaz & Tumaz Enterprises, described by The Standard as “the investor”, obtained a gag order preventing the County and Lands Executive from putting up notices for planned demolitions. In August 2018, The Star reported that Mwale and then-Governor Wycliffe Oparanya intended to sign a memorandum of understanding and dismiss both sides’ lawsuits.

== Climate ==
MMTC is situated in a tropical rainforest climate. The area sees stable year-round temperatures averaging 20.8 °C (69.4 °F) and ranging from average lows of 19.7 °C (67.4 °F) in the coolest month of July to average highs of 29.4 °C (84.8 °F) in the warmest month of February. The temperature rarely ever rises above 31.7 °C (89 °F) or drops below 12.8 °C (55 °F)

Humidity is 56-79% year-round.

There is frequent rainfall, with an average as low as 77 mm (3.0 inches) in the driest month of February and as high as 244 mm (9.6 inches) in the wettest month of April.

== Economy ==
=== Research and Innovation park ===
The research and innovation park is based at the Plaza district and is welcoming a Sh28 billion ($260 million) data center by the French firm Atos. As the Research Park grows, several other major international firms have already taken space and chosen MMTC as their African headquarters.

=== Hamptons Mall and Residences ===
Hamptons mall is a multi-billion shilling shopping mall anchored by Mwal-mart supermarket which provides a ready market for the 35,000 residents in the City, to supply their organic produce and for shopping. The mall also contains Hamptons Cafe bed and breakfast and more than 90,000 square feet of private residences; that contain gymnasium and olympic size swimming pool for private residents. These were part of phase 1 of the City construction from 2014 to 2016

=== Industrial District ===
The industrial district is one of the 5 economic centers of MMTC, and is anchored by a solar power plant. The district runs for 4 Kilometers and has its main two arterial roads; the Power plant road and By-pass road connected by the boulevard. With its emphasis on sustainable development, MMTC has attracted globally-leading technology companies and hundreds of international investors. One such firm is the Miami-based Innova Eco Building System which invested US$40 million in 2019 to build a green eco panels manufacturing plant at MMTC for building the 4800 homes, most of which have already been purchased pre-construction by investors from the US and elsewhere.

These homes, like all facilities in the city, will be powered using 100% renewable energy such as solar. Atlanta-based MCX Environmental Energy Corp has invested US$100 million to build a 30-megawatt solar power plant right in the city, to complement the city's other renewable energy solutions. MMTC's solar power plant came online in 2021.

== Influence ==
Due to MMTC growing popularity, several delegations have conducted benchmarking tours. In June 2023, Botswana’s Vice President Slumber Tsogwane - accompanied by more than a dozen top government officials from Botswana and Kenya, including Botswana's foreign minister Hon. Lemogang Kwape, and Kenya's Cabinet Secretary for Cooperatives and Enterprise Development Hon. Simon Chelugui visited the city and held discussions with lead investor Mwale. Media reports indicated that the discussions centred on expanding Hamptons Hospital to the South African country. In March 2023, MMTC played a host to a high-powered delegation led by the former President of Ethiopia, Dr. Mulatu Teshome. The former president, who was received by MMTC founder Julius Mwale, toured the various districts and expressed admiration for the strides made in transforming the metropolis. He prevailed upon the lead investor to visit Ethiopia and explore similar opportunities. Other than the incoming visits, Mr. Mwale and his lead teams have honored invitations from other African governments including Congo DRC, Congo Brazzaville, Senegal, Zambia, Ghana and Uganda. A section of local and international media sources alleged that the parties are at various stages of signing partnership deals on establishing of similar smart cities or on medical tourism.

=== Inaugural Marathon ===
On 16 December 2023, MMTC held its inaugural marathon. The event's main aim was to raise funds to support low-income families to afford healthcare premiums of Social Health Insurance Fund (SHIF)/NHIF. The sporting event attracted both local and global elite athletes in the categories of 42 km, 21 km, 10km, 5km and 1600 meters. According to the marathon planners, who included former Kenya Ambassador to the US H.E. Elkanah Odembo, the charity event, which was also the first to be held in the 14 County Lake region economic bloc (LREB) with 16 million Kenyans, will now occur on annual basis. There are suggestions to improve the aspects of the event to make it the first-label marathon in the history of Kenya.

== Challenges & controversy ==
Despite the local support and apparent victories against adversarial politicians, MMTC and affiliates have not been without controversy. Founder Julius Mwale and associated entities faced multiple legal challenges over contractual obligations and other business disputes. Several cases brought against Mwale have been deemed by the court to be without merit and dismissed, and in others, the plaintiffs in question were ordered to complete their contractual obligations prior to demanding payment. Remaining disputes appear to be ongoing, with Mwale's team appealing a few High Court of Kenya judgments against them. In the face of such challenges, Mwale's team has stated that they are confident of winning their ongoing appeals.

Of particular note is a 2025 appeal by Tumaz and Tumaz Enterprises in regard to an unusual ruling in which the High Court of Kenya at Nairobi held Mwale and Tumaz and Tumaz Enterprises personally liable to Sifatronix Limited for Sh17 million of a contract that Tumaz and Tumaz Enterprises had awarded to Epic Agencies, for which Sifatronix Limited was a sub-contractor. There has been speculation about whether the rulings and twists in the case have been influenced by an ongoing feud between Mwale's lawyer, Nelson Havi, and the presiding judge in the case, whom Havi has accused publicly of corruption. The appeal is ongoing.
