= Kikuyu, Kenya =

Kikuyu
- Town Council
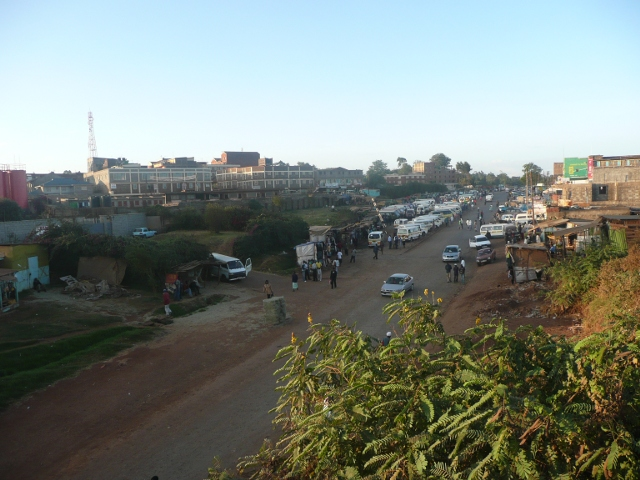
- Kikuyu in 2009

- Location in Kenya
- Coordinates: 1°15′S 36°40′E
- Country: Kenya
- County: Kiambu County

Population (2019)
  - Total: 323,881
- Time zone: UTC+3 (EAT)
- Climate: Cfb

Kikuyu is a municipality in Kiambu County, Kenya, which grew from a settlement of colonial missionaries. The town is located about 20 km (12 mi) northwest of central Nairobi. It is about 20 minutes from Nairobi via a number of routes, including a dual carriage road, the Southern Bypass and has a railway station on the Mombasa – Malaba Railway Line. The town is named after the Kikuyu/Gĩkũyũ people, the major ethnicity that settled in the area. As of 2019, the total population was 323,881.

The jurisdiction also includes the Ondiri Wetland which is the source of the Nairobi River. With the recent completion of the Southern Bypass that connects Mombasa to Nairobi via Kikuyu, the town is poised for greater growth as it is the only town on the Bypass.

The municipality is within the authority of Nairobi Metropolitan. It hosts a Sub-County Administration which is the administrative division in Kiambu County.

== History ==
David Clement Scott was a Scottish missionary who had success and gained controversy in Blantyre in what is now Malawi. He had been named a "negrophile" and he arrived in Kikuyu in 1901. He had been relieved of his position in 1898 after losing his family to Malaria. Here he cleared the land and to the annoyance of the Foreign Mission Committee he bought an estate of 3,000 acres which was managed by a Christian labour force. He lost his own and other peoples money and the Foreign Mission Committee again insisted on his obedience. He died here in 1907.

The town has some British colonial history links, like the Right Reverend Musa Gitau (Swahili for Moses Gitau), an African believer in democracy who led among the first Christian faithful during colonial times. He lived and worked in the town as a reverend and in his honor two schools were named after him, Musa Gitau Primary School and Musa Gitau Secondary School.

An interdenominational missionary conference held in Kikuyu in June 1913 provoked the so-called Kikuyu controversy, which briefly roiled the Anglican churches from December 1913 to February 1914

== Institutions within Kikuyu ==
Some of the major institutions in Kikuyu are;

=== 1. Research Institutions ===
Kenya Forestry Research Institute (KEFRI), Kenya Agricultural Research Institute (KARI), and Kenya Trypanosomiasis Research Institute (KETRI)

=== 2. Higher learning Institutions ===
University of Nairobi – Kikuyu Campus which hosts the College of Education and External Studies. It also hosts the Presbyterian University of Eastern Africa (PUEA), Thogoto Teachers Training College, Kikuyu Commercial College, Vantage Teachers College and Kismart College among others.

=== 3. Schools ===
Kikuyu is home to two National High Schools; Alliance High School and Alliance Girls High School. It also has several day and boarding schools including Kahuho Uhuru High School, Rungiri Secondary School, Uthiru Girls High School, Kikuyu Day Secondary School, Muhu Secondary School, Gichuru Memorial School, Musa Gitau Secondary School, Karai Day Secondary School, Kirangari High School, Moi Girls Kamangu, Green Garden Girls High School, Muguga High school, Star Sheikh Academies, Mary Leakey Girls School, Kevin Carey High School and Mai-a-ihii Secondary School.

Primary schools include Kikuyu Township Primary School, The Green Garden Schools, Jeverden Highlands Academy, Nderi Primary School, St. Veronica I.L.C, Kidfarmaco Primary School, Musa Gitau Primary School, Uthiru Genesis School, Muthiga Academy, Damacrest Schools, Patmos Montessori School, Mama Ngina Primary School, Fairlawns Primary School, Utafiti Primary School, Nguriunditu primary school, Kandeng'wa Primary School, Kid Zone School, Valley Crest Academy, Njumbi Primary School, Gicharani Primary School, Thogoto Primary School, Wambaa Primary School, Kanyiha Primary School, Magutuini Primary School, Thirime Primary School, Mai ai hii Primary School, Gikambura Primary School, Gacio School and Shalom Junior Academy, Ellys school, Great Vision School, Golden Heights Academy, Roots Academy, Mabawa kids Academy.

== Economic Activities ==
Kikuyu is both a residential and industrial town. It boasts of several factories and manufacturing industries that range from the metallic to the medical sector.

Over 30 factories and industries exist around the town, with about half of them situated within the Magana light industries.

Kikuyu town has a Universal Corporation factory, that was the first drugs company in Kenya to commercially produce Antiretroviral therapy drugs (ARVs).

Other industries include: Coninx, Texplast Industries, Match Masters LTD, Silver Star Manufacturers, Crystal Industries, EAKO Holdings Limited, Glacier Products LTD Chocolate Factory, to mention just a few.

A number of financial institutions and hospitals serve the town. Banks with branches in the town include: Equity, Family, ABSA, KCB, Co-operative Bank and Kenya Women Microfinance Bank. P.C.E.A Kikuyu Hospital, a major eye unit hospital and Lifecare are amongest the hospitals within the town.

The town has significant shopping establishments, ultra-modern recreation & entertainment centers, and a bustling night life. Recreational facilities and accommodations include Sigona Golf Club, the Wida Highway Motel, Kari Holiday Retreat Centre, the PCEA Lay Training Centre and Levilla Gardens & Resort.

Outskirts of the town, the chief activities in small scale are livestock and crop farming due to its geology and rich soil texture.

Elite residential apartments have come up in areas around the town. Most low-income earners live in Kianda Kia Reli (loosely translated to down the railway line), while a significant population who work in the country's capital or have their businesses in the town live in Kidfarmaco estate.

== Historical Sites ==
There are several historical sites within the town, such as the caves dug by Indian 'coollies' when constructing the Kenya-Uganda railway. These caves are found just below the town under the railway facing Magana farm. Other sites include the graves of two explorers who were killed by lions in the 19th century at Kanyariri, a few meters from where Fort Smith was situated; the Undiri swamp, and the PCEA Church of the Torch, the first building at Thogoto.

== Transport ==
Transport to the capital and other places is available in form of matatus, minibuses and trains. It is also conveniently served through most Taxi – Cab services with rates averaging Kshs 1800 – 2500 (as of Jan 2016).

== See also ==
- Kabete, a town in the Kikuyu division
