= Thika Road =

Road in Kenya

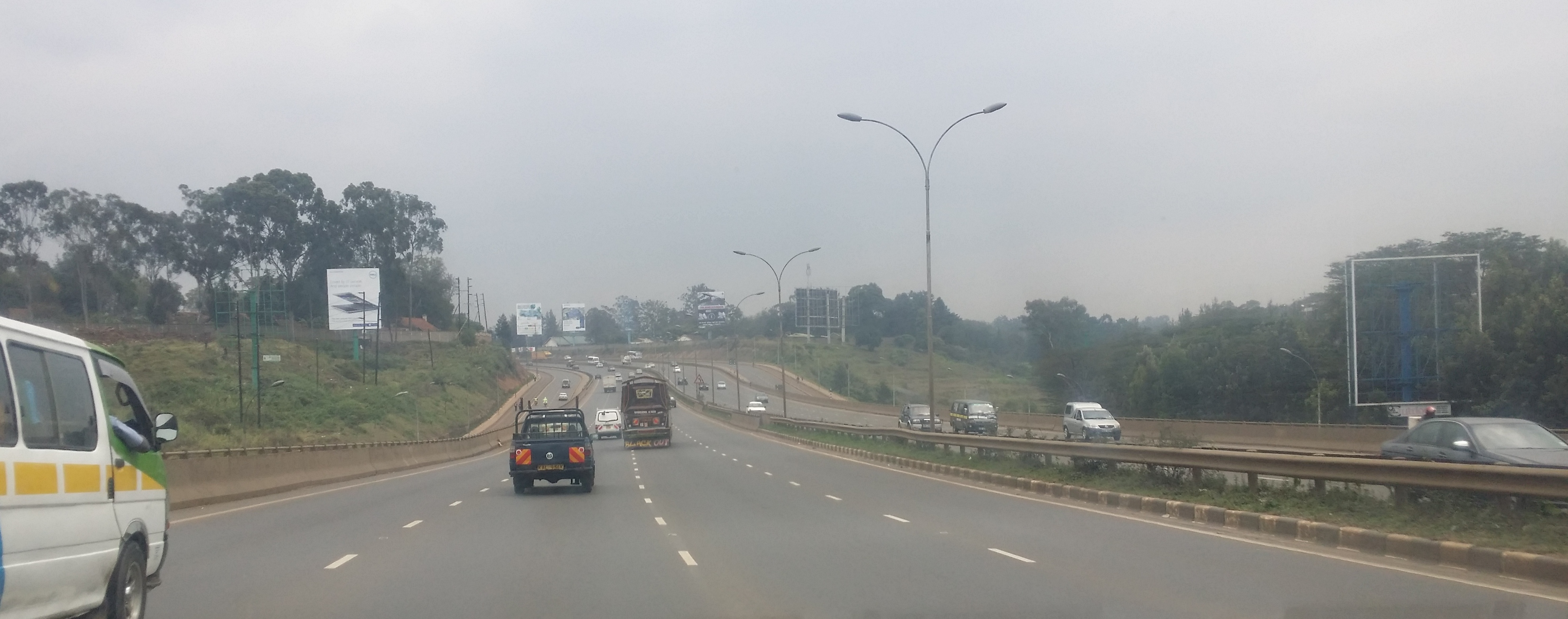
The A2 (Thika Road)

Thika Road (commonly known as the Thika Superhighway) is an 8-lane controlled-access highway in Kenya, with 12 lanes in some sections. It links the capital city of Nairobi with the industrial town of Thika. Thika Road forms 50 km of the A2 Highway, which is part of the Cape to Cairo Road. In Kenya, it links Namanga at the Tanzania-Kenya border to the Kenya-Ethiopia border town of Moyale.

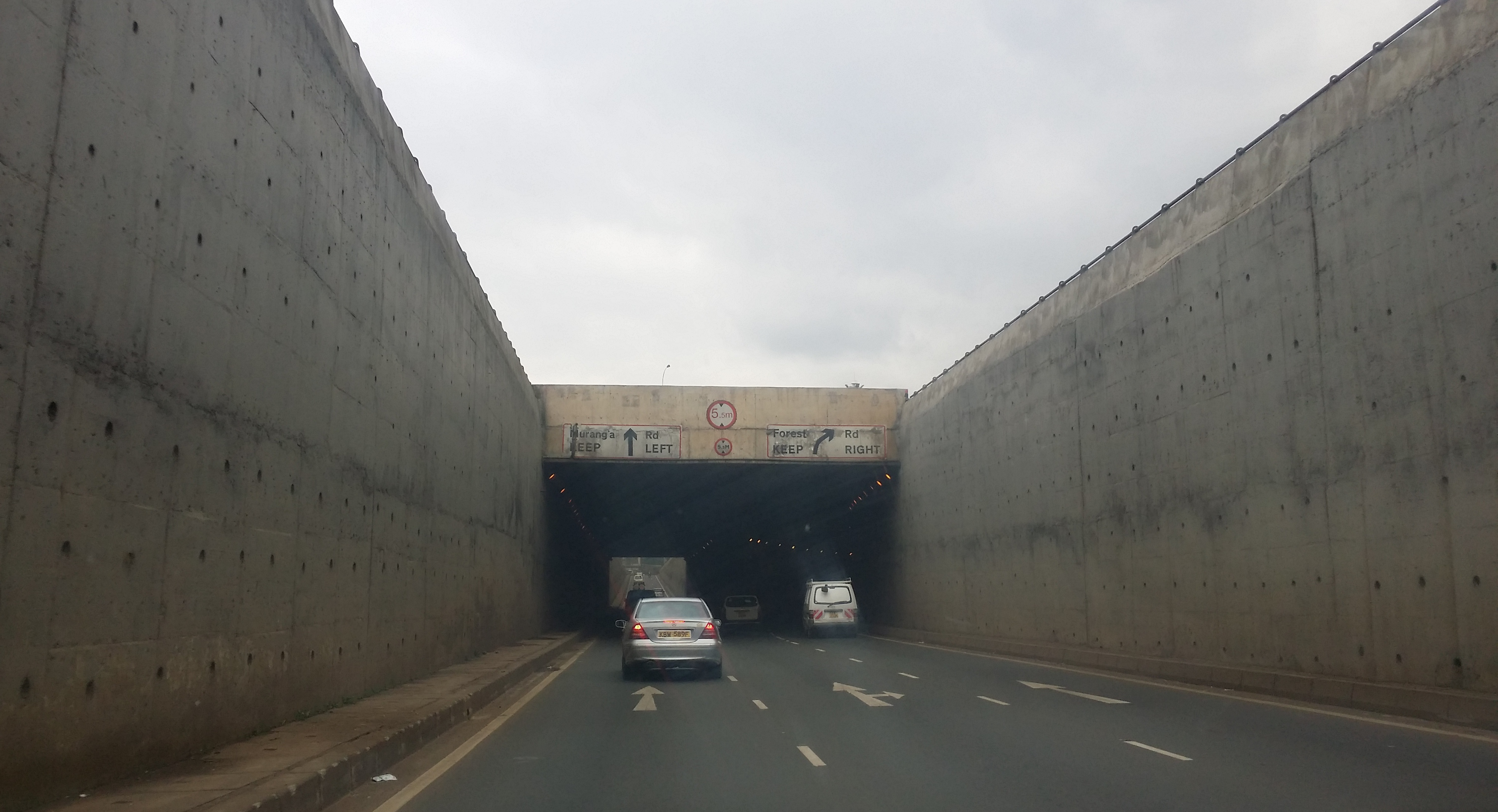
Underpass at the A2, Kenya

== Construction ==
BHGH industrial development increased along the A2 Highway, the old road became very congested. It took 2 hours to drive the 50-km stretch to Thika, and road accidents were common. Construction of the new Thika Superhighway began in January 2009 and ended with its inauguration in November 2012 by the then President of the Republic of Kenya, the late Mwai Kibaki. The highway was divided into three parts, each awarded to a different contractor. China Wu Yi built the section from the Uhuru Highway to Muthaiga Roundabout, Sinohydro built from the Muthaiga Roundabout to Kenyatta University, and Shengli Engineering completed the highway to Thika.

The total cost of the project was Ksh 32 billion (US$360 million). The funding was provided by the African Development Bank (US$180 million), the Exim Bank of China (US$100 million), and the Kenyan government (US$80 million).

The section between Muthaiga roundabout and Ruiru town is considered to be a part of the Nairobi Northern Bypass, connecting to the Limuru Road

== See also ==
- 2014 Nairobi bus bombings
- Nairobi Bypasses
