= Nairobi Eastern Bypass Highway =

Kenyan road

Coordinates: 01°12′57″S 36°59′27″E

Route information
- Length: 19.9 mi (32.0 km)
- History: Designated in 2017; Completion in 2021

Major junctions
- South end: Mombasa Road at Airport North Road
- Embakasi; Utawala; Ruai; Varsityville Estate
- North end: Ruiru-Kiambu Rd Junction

Location
- Country: Kenya

Highway system
- Transport in Kenya

The Nairobi Eastern Bypass Highway is a road in Kenya, forming a semi-circle through the south-eastern and north-eastern neighbourhoods of the capital city of Nairobi. The road allows traffic from Mombasa, destined for the central parts of Kenya to bypass downtown Nairobi, thereby reducing traffic congestion in the city's central business district.

== Location ==
The road starts at the junction of the Nairobi–Mombasa Road and Airport North Road, in Embakasi, immediately west of Nairobi International Airport, approximately 11.5 kilometres (7 mi) south-east of the city centre.

The road then loops through the south-eastern suburbs of Nairobi, skirting the northern edges of Jomo Kenyatta International Airport, through Ruai. It then crosses from Nairobi County, into Kiambu County and turns westwards, passing underneath the Thika Highway and ends at the Ruiru Kamiti Road, at a place called Ruiru Road Junction.

The total length of the Nairobi Eastern Bypass Highway is approximately 44 kilometres (27 mi).

== Overview ==
This road is intended to relieve traffic congestion in the capital city's central business district, by diverting long-distance traffic from and to the port city to Mombasa, destined for central Kenya and the counties directly north of Nairobi.

In a similar effort, other bypass highways have been built on the northern and southern sides of Nairobi, with the objective of alleviating downtown traffic congestion.

== Construction ==
The Government of Kenya, though the Kenya National Highway Authority (KeNHA), built this highway and opened it to traffic in 2014. Initially constructed as single carriageway road, efforts were initiated in 2017 to convert the highway into a four-lane dual carriageway road.

== See also ==
- East African Community
- List of roads in Kenya
- List of bypass highways in Nairobi
