= Ruaka, Kiambu County =

Town in Kiambu, Kenya

Ruaka is a town in Kiambu County, Kenya. The town is located north west of Nairobi, at the western end of the Northern Bypass along Limuru Road. Ruaka is part of the larger Nairobi Metropolitan Conurbation. The town formed part of the former Karuri Town Council local authority area.

Two Rivers Mall, in Nairobi County, is close to Ruaka. Ntomo Safaris - Ruaka
